= Siegfried of Ballenstedt =

Count Palatine of the Rhineland (c. 1075–1113)

Siegfried I of Ballenstedt
- Coat of arms of the Counts of Ballenstedt
- Born: c. 1075
- Died: 9 March 1113
- Noble family: House of Ascania
- Spouse: Gertrude of Northeim
- Issue: Siegfried II of Weimar-Orlamünde; Adela of Weimar-Orlamünde; William of Weimar-Orlamünde
- Father: Adalbert II of Ballenstedt
- Mother: Adelaide of Weimar-Orlamünde

Siegfried I of Ballenstedt (c. 1075 – 9 March 1113), was the son of Adalbert II of Ballenstedt, and a member of the House of Ascania. He was count palatine of the Rhineland (r.1095/7-1113), and count of Weimar-Orlamünde (r.1112-1113).

== Life ==
Siegfried was born around 1075. He was the son of Adalbert II of Ballenstedt and Adelaide of Weimar-Orlamünde, daughter of Otto I of Meissen and his wife, Adela of Louvain. Siegfried's father, Adalbert, was murdered by Egeno II of Konradsburg in 1080, and Siegfried's brother, Otto the Rich, succeeded him as count of Ballenstedt. Siegfried inherited his father's property in Nordthüringengau.

After Adalbert's death, Siegfried's mother remarried twice, to two successive counts palatine of the Rhineland: first, Hermann II (d.1085), and then Henry of Laach (d.1095). After Henry's death, Siegfried claimed his title of count palatine of the Rhineland (r.1095/7-1113).

Influenced by the First Crusade, Siegfried is thought to have travelled to Jerusalem. In 1112 he is also said to have completed the foundation of Maria Laach Abbey, begun in 1093 by his mother, Adelaide, and his stepfather, Henry of Laach.

In 1112 Ulric II of Weimar-Orlamünde died without heirs. By virtue of his mother, Adelaide's, kinship, Siegfried then claimed Ulric's title. This led Siegfried into conflict with Emperor Henry V. Imperial partisans attacked Siegfried at the Teufelsmauer in the Harz on 21 February 1113. Siegfried survived the attack, but died of his injuries on 9 March 1113.

== Marriage and children ==
Siegfried married Gertrude, a daughter of Henry, Margrave of Frisia, with whom he had three children:

- Siegfried II of Weimar-Orlamünde (1107-1124)
- Adela of Weimar-Orlamünde, married Conrad I of Peilstein
- Wilhelm von Ballenstedt (1112-1140)

== Notes ==
Siegfried of Ballenstedt House of Ascania Born: c. 1155 Died: 1206
Preceded by Henry of Laach	Count Palatine of the Rhineland; 1095/7-1113	Succeeded by Gottfried von Calw
Preceded by Ulric II	Count of Weimar-Orlamünde; 1112-1113	Succeeded by Siegfried II of Weimar-Orlamünde
