= Anhalt Castle =

Castle in Saxony-Anhalt, Germany

- Burg Anhalt
- Harzgerode
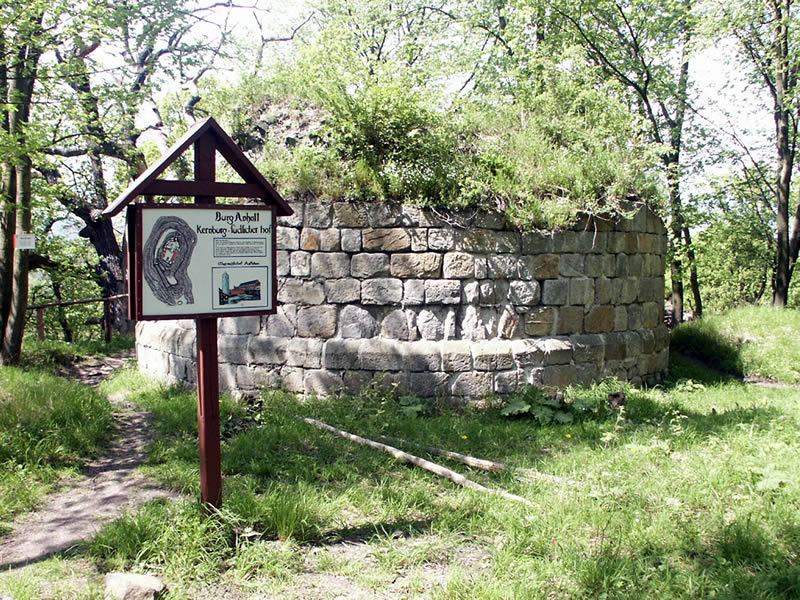
- Foundation of the keep

Site information
- Type: hill castle
- Code: DE-ST
- Condition: Base of the keep, wall remnants

Location
- Coordinates: 51°40′05″N 11°11′35″E

Site history
- Built: around 1123
- Materials: Brick

Garrison information
- Occupants: counts

Anhalt Castle (German: Burg Anhalt) is a ruined medieval fortification near the town of Harzgerode in Saxony-Anhalt, Germany.

== Location ==
The castle is located in the eastern, lower part of the Harz mountain range (Unterharz). The ruins stand on the Großer Hausberg, a hill situated between the villages of Meisdorf and Mägdesprung, above the Selke valley. The area is part of the Harz/Saxony-Anhalt Nature Park; at a short distance up the Selke river is the preserved Falkenstein Castle.

== History ==
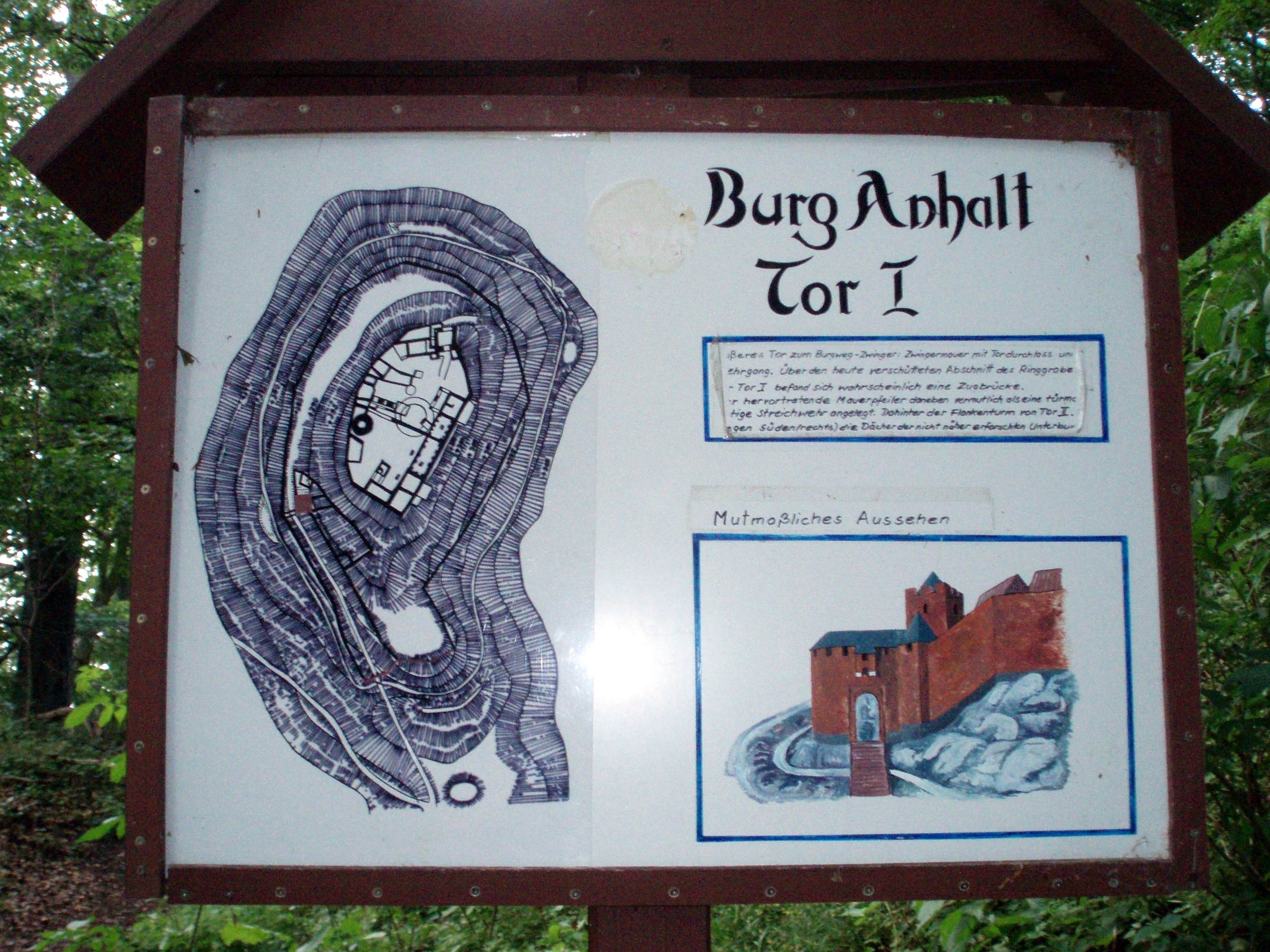
Information board on the site of the castle gate

The fortress was probably built by Count Otto of Ballenstedt (d. 1123), a member of the Saxon noble House of Ascania. Otto's grandfather Count Esico, mentioned in a 1036 deed issued by Emperor Conrad II, had ruled in the Saxon Schwabengau and the adjacent territories of the Saxon Eastern March. Otto assumed comital rights in Saxony after the assassination of his father Count Adalbert II in 1080; he married Eilika, the daughter of Duke Magnus of Saxony, and launched several campaigns against the Polabian Slavs. Shortly before his death, he turned the collegiate church in Ballenstedt into a Benedictine abbey and had Anhalt Castle erected as the dynasty's ancestral seat, from which the Ascanian Principality of Anhalt got its name.

The castle was first mentioned in 1140: while Otto's son Albert the Bear fought for the Saxon ducal title against the rivalling Welf dynasty, the fortress was devastated by the forces of the Archbishop of Magdeburg and Margrave Conrad of Meissen. Shortly afterwards, however, Albert had it rebuilt. The new castle complex was one of the mightiest fortifications in the Harz region. The scale of the castle was comparable to that of the Wartburg in Thuringia. The dry moat with its outer rampart (the Vorwall) that surrounded the castle, had a length of 543 metres (1,781 ft). This castle was built of brick, a material uncharacteristic of its time and the area. According to legend, the name is derived from Middle Low German: An-Holt, "(built) without wood".

The castle remained occupied until the early 14th century and afterwards decayed. Early excavations were initiated by Duke Alexius of Anhalt-Bernburg in 1822. From 1901 to 1907 excavations were carried out on the site of the ruins under the direction of the Brunswick surveyor, Brinckmann. All that remains of the castle today are a few wall sections from the chapel, living quarters and outbuildings, and the base of the bergfried, which is about three metres high. Large parts of the premises were restored and made accessible to the public in 2012, on the occasion of the 800th anniversary of the establishment of the Anhalt principality.

== Hiking ==
Anhalt Castle (Burgruine Anhalt) is checkpoint no. 197 in the Harzer Wandernadel hiking system.

== Sources ==
- Peter Feist: Burg Anhalt - Der Ort, der dem Land den Namen gab. Kai Homilius Verlag, Berlin 1997, ISBN 3-931121-34-8.
- Lutz Partenheimer: Albrecht der Bär. Gründer der Mark Brandenburg und des Fürstentums Anhalt. 2. Aufl. Köln/Weimar/Vienna 2003, ISBN 3-412-16302-3, p. 78 f., 256 f.
