= Ackeburg =

Ackeburg / Ackenburg
- Falkenstein/Harz
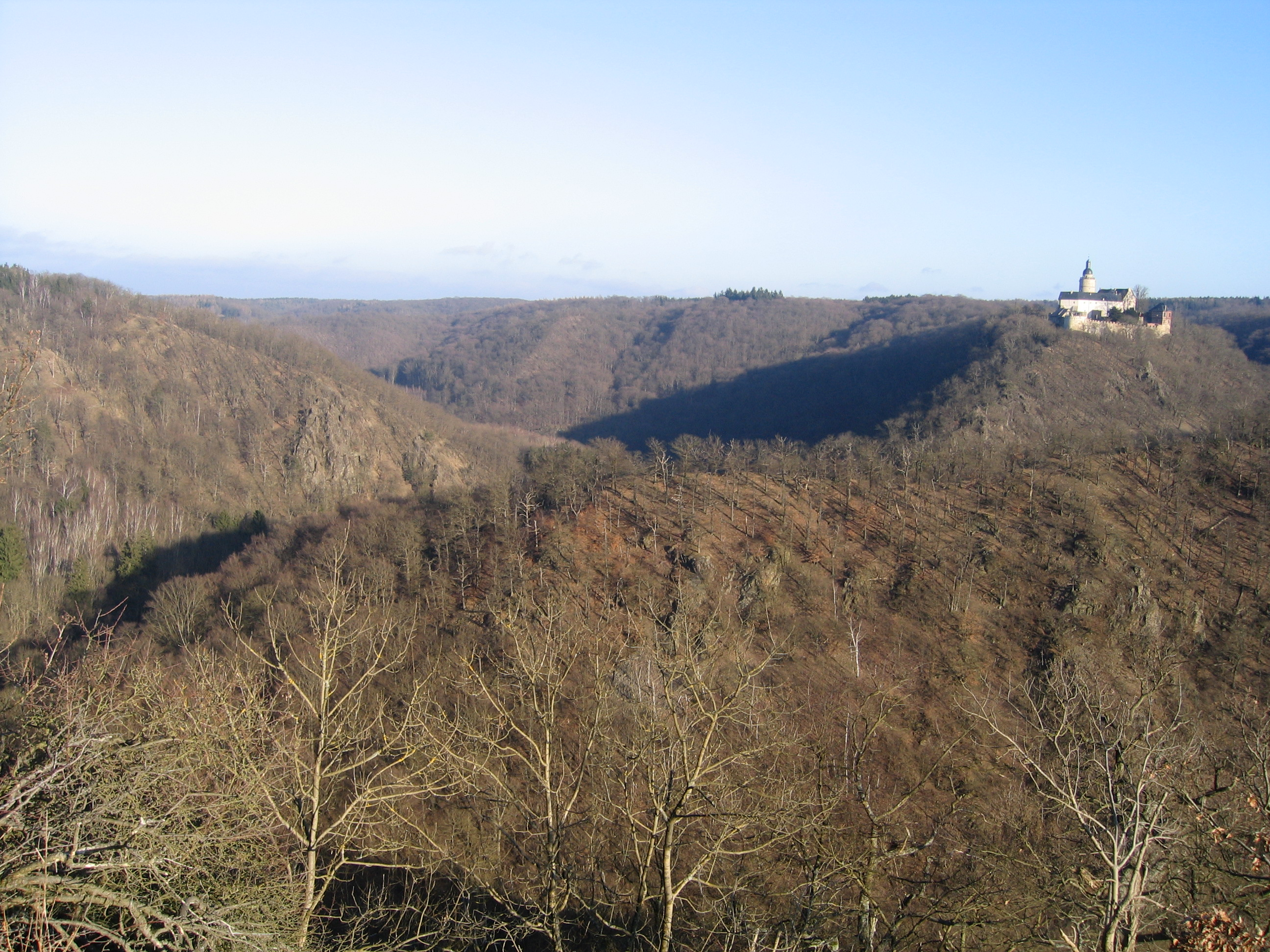
- View of the Selke Valley and Falkenstein Castle from the Selkesicht viewing point

Site information
- Type: hill castle
- Code: DE-ST
- Condition: neck ditch, transverse rampart

Location
- Location within Saxony-Anhalt Location within Germany
- Coordinates: 51°41′10″N 11°15′13″E
- Height: 333.2 m above sea level (NN)

Site history
- Built: first recorded in 1216

The Ackeburg, also called the Ackenburg, in the Harz Mountains of central Germany, is the site of a high medieval hill castle, 333.2 m above sea level (NN), in the borough of Falkenstein/Harz in Harz district in the state of Saxony-Anhalt. It was first mentioned in 1216 and was abandoned or destroyed in 1400. There was also a village associated with it, known as Akkeburg.

== Location ==
The ruins of the Ackeburg are located in the eastern part of that region of the Harz known as Mansfeld Land between Mägdesprung (north of Harzgerode) and Meisdorf (southwest of Falkenstein/Harz) on a rocky ridge (333.2 m above sea level (NN)) high above the valley of the River Selke on its northern flank. It lies in the forested country of the Harz/Saxony-Anhalt Nature Park within the Selke Valley (Selketal) nature reserve about 3.7 km southwest of the village church of Meisdorf.

About 1.2 km to the southwest of the Ackeburg is the site of the Old Falkenstein Castle (Burg Alter Falkenstein) and, circa 1 km southeast lies Falkenstein Castle (New Falkenstein) – both on the far side of the Selke valley.

== History and layout ==
The Ackeburg was first mentioned in 1216 A.D. "as the seat of the castellans of the counts of Falkenstein". From 1400, however, it appears to have been abandoned, like the former village of Akkeburg that was sited at or near the castle and, of which, nothing has survived. The owners of the castle were the "lords of Ackeburg".

The castle, which comprised inner and outer wards with a neck ditch and several ramparts, had an inner ward about 30 metres in diameter standing on a rocky eminence. Above that, in the direction of the highest point of that rise, was an inner ward, about 11 metres across. Today only parts of the neck ditch and transverse rampart are visible.

== Viewing point and walking ==
The Ackeburg may be reached on woodland paths from Meisdorf, including the Meisdorfer Trift that runs past the Eckartsberg (330.5 m above NN) and Wilhelmsberg (329.8 m above NN) hills and finally up the Lumpenstieg trail. About 100 metres south-southeast of the ruins lies the Selkesicht ("Selke View") viewing point (ca. 330 m above NN; 51°41′7.31″N 11°15′16.11″E; with its picnic site), which is no. 204 in the system of checkpoints in the Harzer Wandernadel hiking network. From there there are views into the Selke valley and of Falkenstein Castle (New Falkenstein) high on a ridge on the other side. The Selke flows under the Akkeburg Bridge (207.6 m above NN) south of the viewing point at an elevation of about 205 m; thus the viewing point is about 125 metres above the river. Like the castle, the Selkesicht viewing point may also be reached via the Lumpenstieg trail, which drops steeply into the Selke valley from a point a little further east down to the inn of Zum Falken, where it meets the Selke Valley Trail and the E11 European long distance path.

== Literature ==
- Friedrich Stolberg: Befestigungsanlagen im und am Harz – Von der Frühgeschichte bis zur Neuzeit, Verlag August Lax, Issue 2/1983, ISBN 3826910028
