= Konradsburg =

German castle, monastery and manor house

Coordinates: 51°42′50″N 11°20′52″E

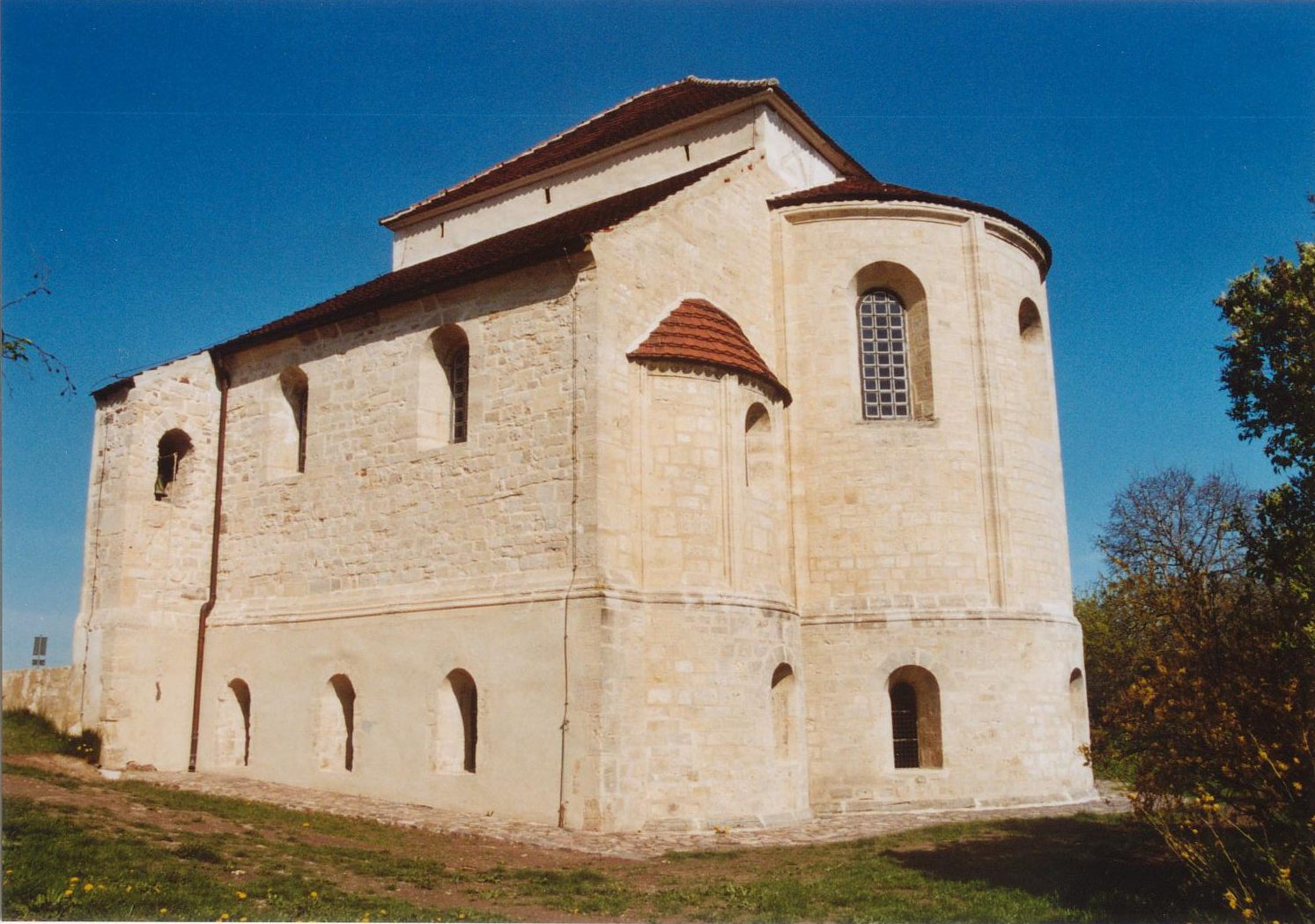
Chancel of the old abbey church (in 2004)

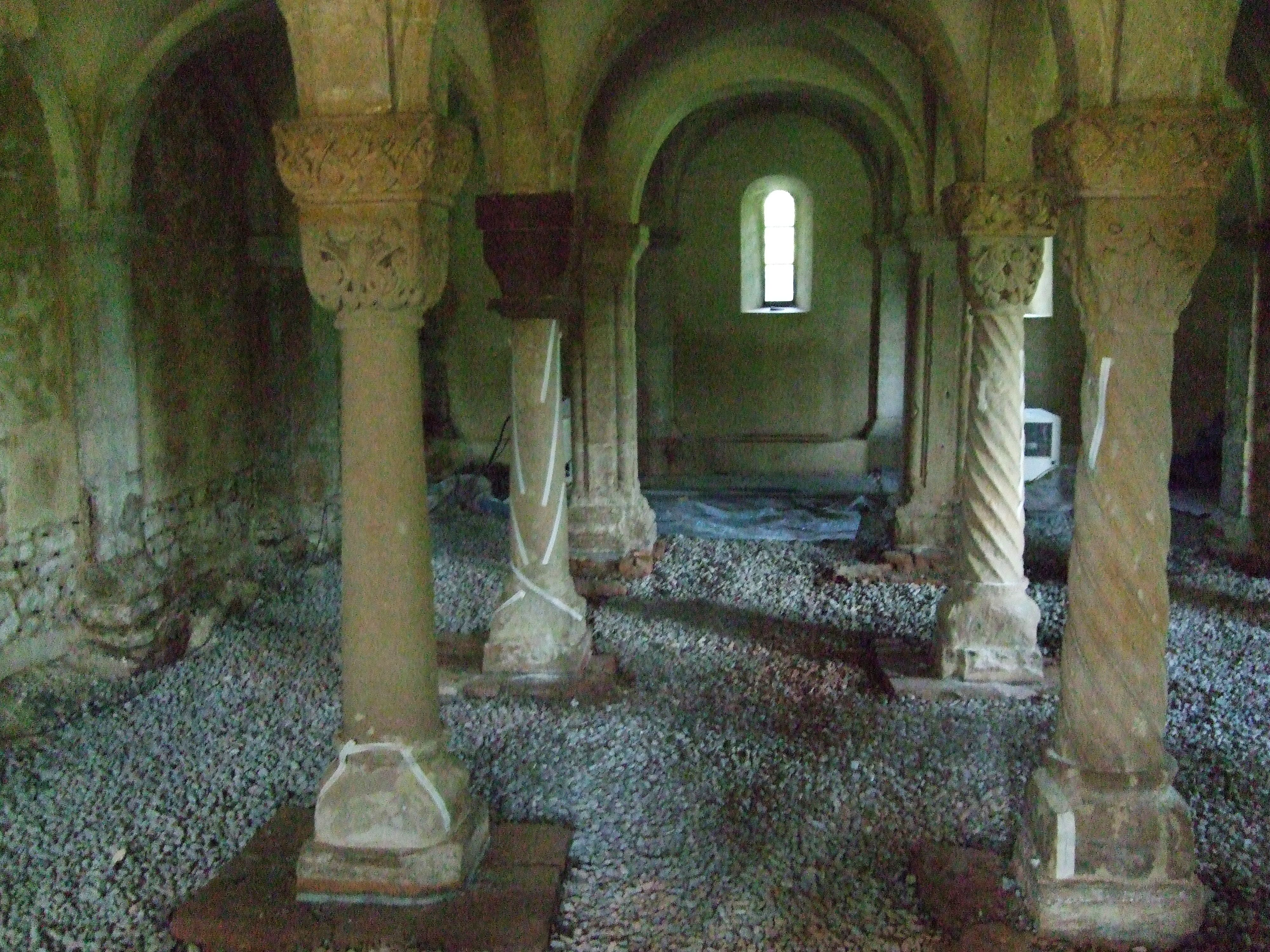
Crypt of the old abbey church during restoration in 2010

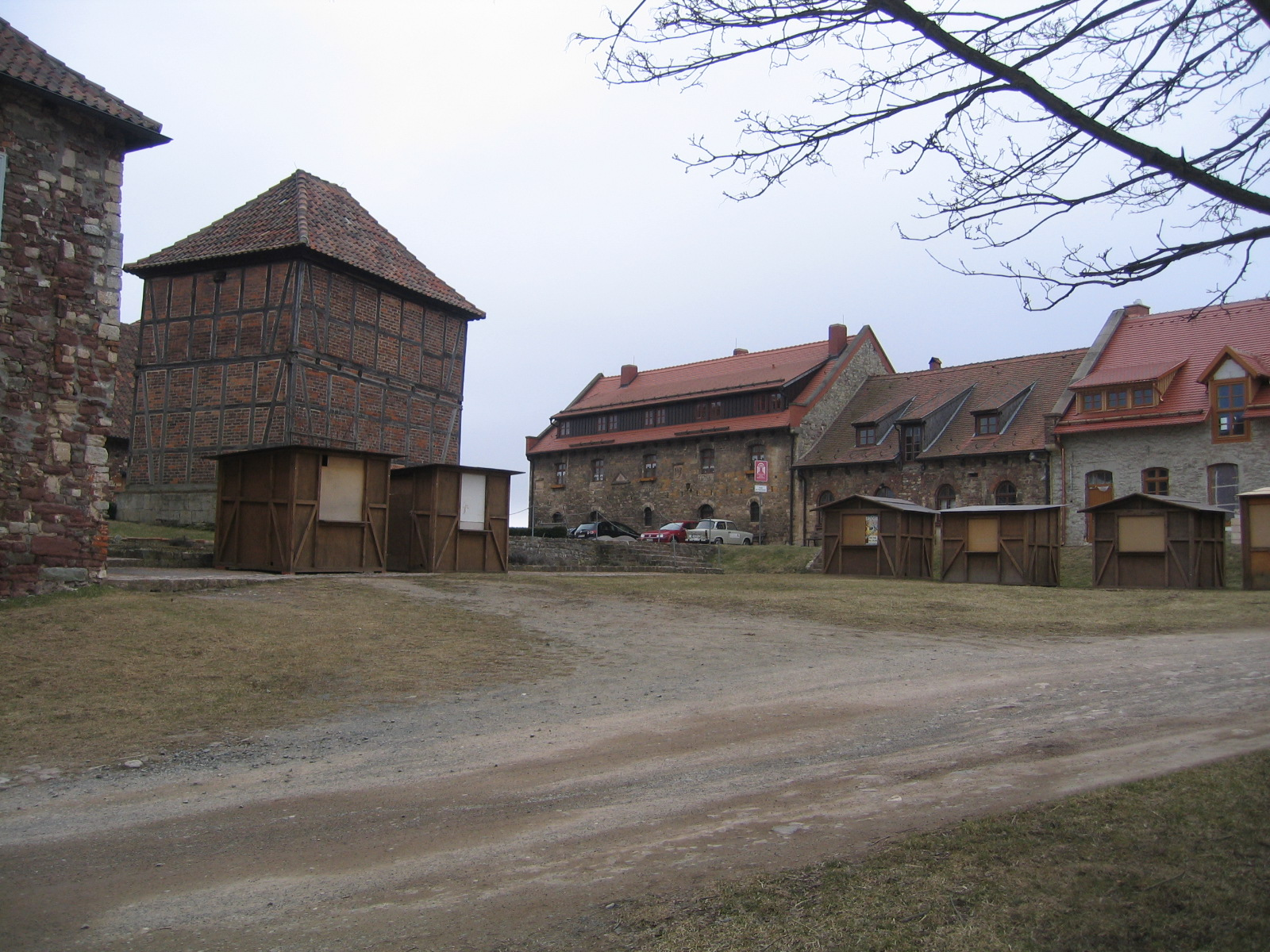
Courtyard with the well tower (left of centre) in 2010

The Konradsburg is a former castle, monastery and manor house near Ermsleben in the German federal state of Saxony-Anhalt.

== Castle ==
Konradsburg was first mentioned in 1021 and was originally built to protect the imperial demesne (Reichsgut) of the Harz. However it has no fortified towers, keep (bergfried) or great hall (Palas) to indicate that it was a fortified castle site.

== Monastery ==
After 1120, the Konradsburgs left this fortified hill spur, which lies about 3 kilometres south of Ermsleben and about eight kilometres west of Aschersleben, built Falkenstein Castle in the Selke valley and called themselves Falkensteins from 1142. On the Konradsburg a Benedictine abbey was founded which became the spiritual and economic centre of the area for several centuries. According to tradition, the conversion of the castle into a monastery had been a reparation imposed on Egeno II of Konradsburg for murdering Adalbert II, Count of Ballenstedt around 1080.

In 1477 the monastery was given to the Carthusians and became Konradsburg Charterhouse. As a result of the German Peasants' War, the monks gave up the monastery of Konradsburg in 1526. Existing structural and excavated remains have revealed the extent of the former monastery. Of the original three-aisled Romanesque basilica, the high chancel and its underlying crypt have been preserved. Despite its simplicity, the chancel conveys a sense of the impressive size of the ancient basilica. The crypt is a five-aisled, groined vault, supported by columns and pillars. Capitals and imposts, decorated with architectural ornaments (Bauzier) showing a wide range of influences (e.g. Rhenish-French), are testimony to the architecture of the 13th century. The main features of the buildings next to the church can be made out from the east and north wing of the enclosure (Klausur).

== Manor house ==
In 1712 the Konradsburg was put to agricultural use as the manor house for an estate, or Domäne, until 1945. In the centre of the old cloister stands the well house, a two-storey, timber-framed building, probably from the 18th century. The well is over 45 metres deep, probably dating to the time of the monastery and has a technical showpiece - a donkey gin (Eselstretrad). The other buildings were constructed in the 18th and 19th centuries for agricultural purposes.

== Post 1945 ==
After 1945, it was used for a short time for agricultural purposes by a private farmer. Efforts by the town of Ermsleben and the Catholic Church in Aschersleben were unable, under the circumstances prevailing at the time (the site lay in Communist East Germany), to prevent the increasing neglect and dilapidation of Konradsburg in the 1970s, a time characterised by a rapid decline in its appearance.

== Conservation and tourism ==
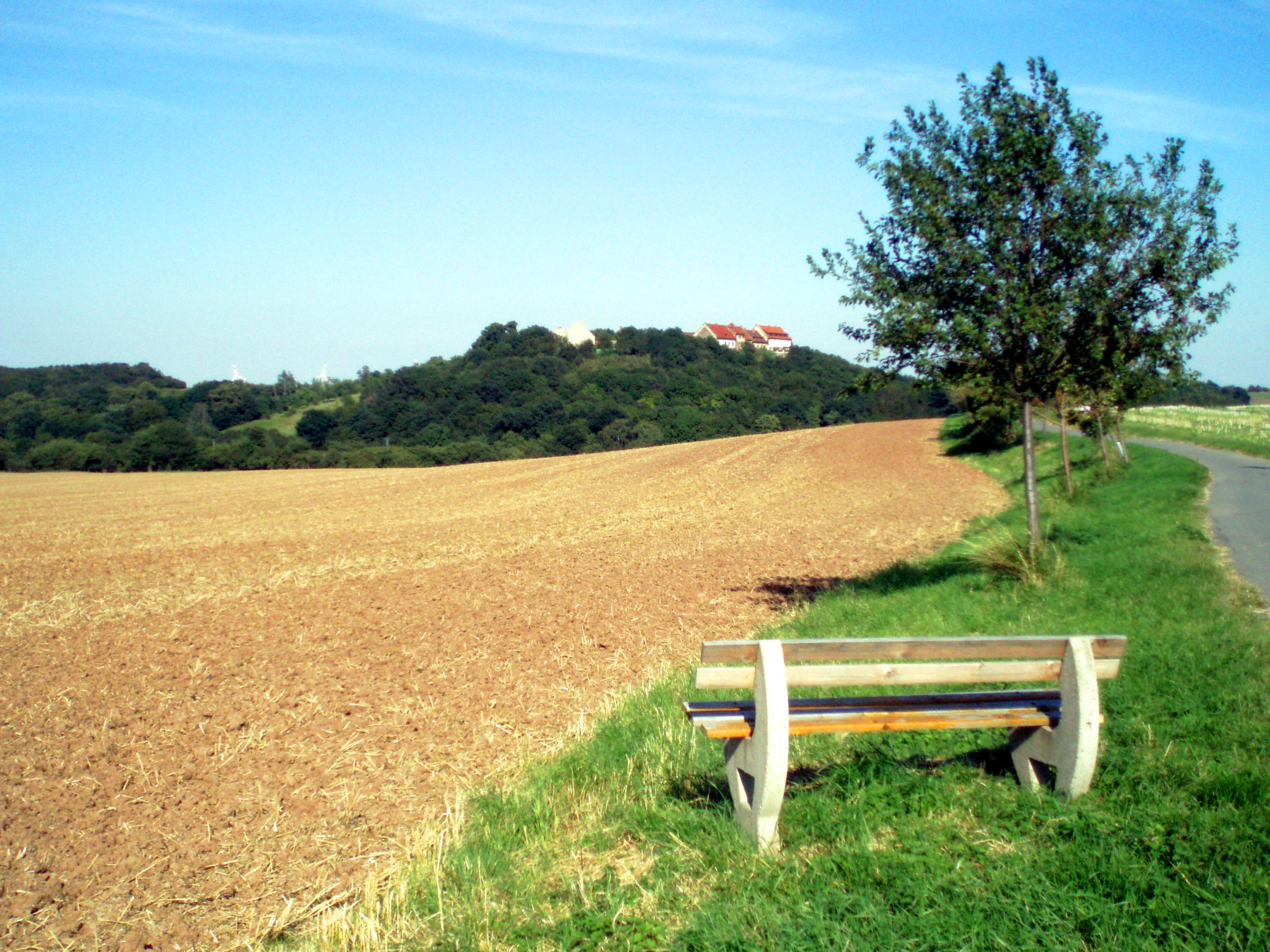
View of the Konradsburg from the road to Friedrichshohenberg

Since 1982 young people have been involved in the conservation of the Konradsburg. From 1984 to 1988 it was supported by students of the Faculty of Art Science of the Humboldt University of Berlin. The decline of the site was halted and part of it was opened to the public. On 1 June 1990 the initiative of the Society for the Promotion of the Konradsburg (Förderkreis Konradsburg) was founded to look after the castle site. In the years that followed, several endangered historic buildings in the vicinity were also taken over by the society, renovated and utilised, for example, the tower windmill at Endorf, the old brick factory at Wieserode and the forester's house at Friedrichshohenberg. In 1994 the society was accepted by UNESCO into its Treasures of the World project. Since 2003 the society has run a sheep-farming business at the foot of the castle. The Konradsburg is a stop on the Romanesque Road.

The Konradsburg remains open to the public and has a cafe. It is also checkpoint 201 on the Harzer Wandernadel hiking trail network.
