= Dedi II of Lusatia =

Margrave of the Saxon Ostmark in 1069

Dedi (or Dedo) II (died 1069), called the Younger (Latin: iunior), was the Margrave of the Saxon Ostmark (also called Lower Lusatia) in 1069.

Dedi II was the eldest son of Dedi I of the Saxon Ostmark and his first wife, Oda, daughter of Theitmar of the Saxon Ostmark. Sometime after 1063, he was given the Sword of Attila by Otto of Nordheim, who had acquired it from Queen Anastasia of Hungary.

After his father's rebellion against Henry IV of Germany in Summer 1069, Dedi II was given his father's title Margrave of Lower Lusatia. Later that same year (before 26 October 1069), Dedi was murdered while relieving himself at night, and thus predeceased his father. It was rumoured that Dedi's stepmother, Adela, was behind his assassination. The Sword of Attila was confiscated by the king upon Dedi's death.

== Notes ==
Preceded by Dedi I	Margrave of the Ostmark; 1069	Succeeded by Dedi I
