= Pansfelde =

- Village of Falkenstein/Harz
- Location of Pansfelde within Falkenstein/Harz
- Interactive map of Pansfelde
- Location within Germany Location within Saxony-Anhalt
- Coordinates: 51°39′31″N 11°16′40″E
- Country: Germany
- State: Saxony-Anhalt
- Town: Falkenstein/Harz
- Elevation: 275 m (902 ft)

Population (2020-12-31)
  - Total: 453
- Time zone: UTC+01:00 (CET)
  - Summer (DST): UTC+02:00 (CEST)
- Postal codes: 06543
- Dialling codes: 034742, 034779

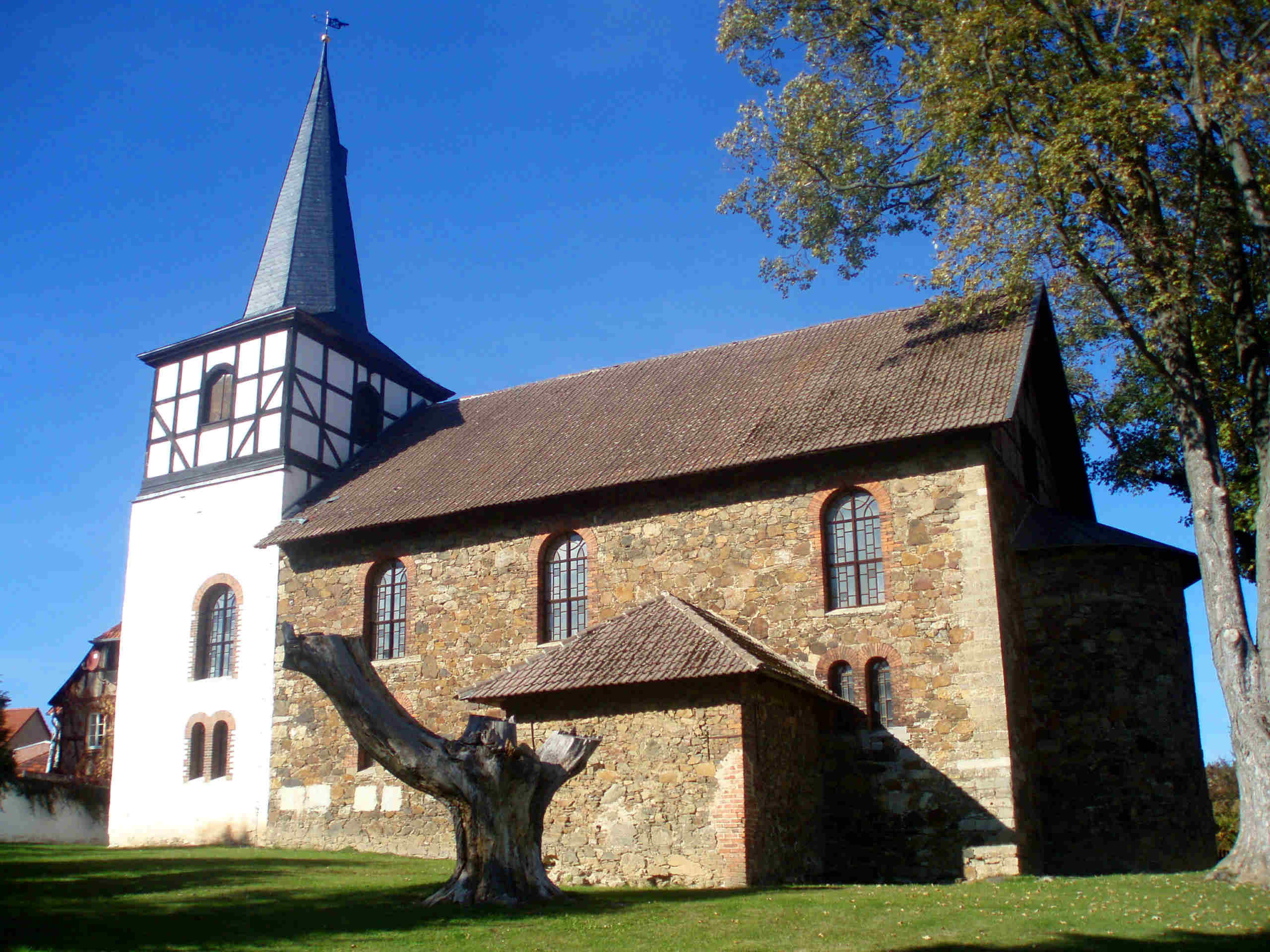
St. John's Church, Pansfelde

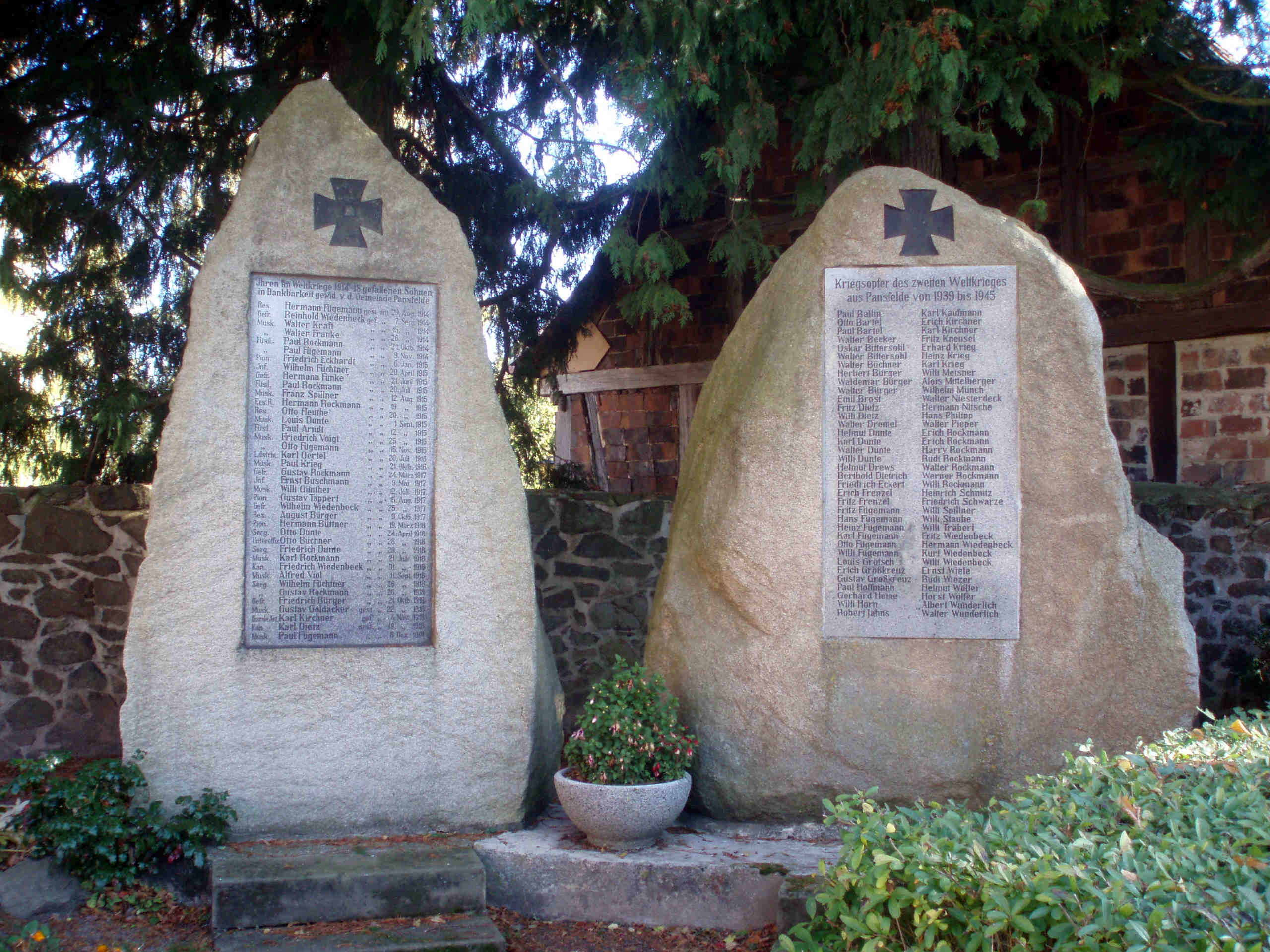
War memorial

Pansfelde is a village in the town of Falkenstein/Harz in the district of Harz in Saxony-Anhalt, Germany.

== Geography ==
Pansfelde lies in the southeastern part of the district of Harz and next to the neighbouring districts of Mansfeld-Südharz and Salzlandkreis on the heights of the Lower Harz plateau, an agricultural upland surrounded by woods. The countryside between the wayside stations of Leinemühle and Gartenhaus, a road toll known as chausseegeld was collected in former times, consists of mixed woods, farmland and pastures in the Schwennecke valley.

== History ==
Pansfelde was first mentioned in 1276 under the name of Pamesvelde. The history of the village and its inhabitants is closely tied to that of Falkenstein Castle. The ancestors of the present 570 or so population worked at the castle, defended it, worked as farm hands or foresters or in the mills and helped during the hunts.

On 1 January 2002 Pansfelde joined the town of Ermsleben and five other villages to form the new town of Falkenstein/Harz.

== Sights ==
Built from rubble stone, the church of St. John and the vicarage, one of the few surviving timber-framed houses in the village, are listed buildings. The village scene is dominated by the former manor estate (Rittergut) of the Counts of Falkenstein. On the terrain of the old sheep farm stands a monument which recalls the events of the 1848 year of revolution. In another spot is a list of names and a memorial to the victims of the two world wars

Additional sights are: Falkenstein Castle, the site of Alter Falkenstein, the legendary Klusberg, the ruins of Anhalt Castle, the seat of the House of Anhalt, and the country park of Degenershausen at Wieserode to the northeast.
