= Egeno of Konradsburg =

Egeno von Konradsburg is the name of the following German nobles:

- Egeno I of Konradsburg, the Elder, one of the free knights of Konradsburg
- Egeno II of Konradsburg, the Younger, one of the free knights of Konradsburg
