= Adalbert II (disambiguation) =

Adalbert II may refer to:

- Adalbert II, Margrave of Tuscany (c.875-915)
- Adalbert II (archbishop of Salzburg) (died 935) for Roman Catholic Archdiocese of Salzburg
- Adalbert II, Count of Ballenstedt (died 1076/83)
- Adalbert II (archbishop of Mainz) (died 1141)
