= Otto the Rich =

Otto the Rich may refer to:

- Otto, Count of Ballenstedt (died 1123), the first Ascanian prince to call himself count of Anhalt; briefly named duke of Saxony
- Otto II, Margrave of Meissen (1125–1190)
