= Adelaide of Weimar-Orlamünde =

German noblewoman (c. 1055 – 1100)

- Born: c. 1055
- Died: 28 March 1100
- Buried: Springiersbach Abbey
- Spouses: Adalbert II of Ballenstedt; Hermann II of Lotharingia; Henry of Laach
- Issue: Otto; Siegfried
- Father: Otto I of Meissen
- Mother: Adela of Louvain

Adelaide of Weimar-Orlamünde (c. 1055 – 28 March 1100) was the daughter of Otto I of Meissen and a member of the family of the counts of Weimar and Orlamünde. She married successively, Adalbert II of Ballenstedt, count palatine Herman II, and Henry of Laach.

== Life ==
Adelaide was the daughter and heiress of Otto I of Meissen and his wife, Adela of Louvain.Her older sisters were Oda, who married Egbert II of Meissen, and Cunigunda, who married Yaropluk, son of Iziaslav I of Kiev, then Kuno of Nordheim, and finally Wiprecht von Groitzsch.

== First Marriage ==
Adelaide's first husband was Adalbert II of Ballenstedt, a member of the House of Ascania. Adalbert was murdered by Egeno II of Konradsburg in 1079. With Adalbert, Adelaide had two sons:

- Otto the Rich (c. 1070 – 1123), Count of Ballenstedt
- Siegfried (c. 1075 – 1113), Count of Weimar-Orlamünde, Count Palatine of the Rhine from 1095/97.

== Second marriage ==
After Adalbert's death, Adelaide married for a second time, around 1080, to count palatine Herman II of Lotharingia, a member of the Ezzonid dynasty. Hermann was killed in a duel with Albert III of Namur, in a battle near Dalhem on 20 September 1085. With Hermann II, Adelaide had two children, both of whom died in infancy before 1085, and whose names are unknown.

== Third marriage ==
After Hermann's death in 1085, Adelaide married again. Her third husband was Henry of Laach from the House of Luxembourg. From at least 1097 onwards, Henry was the successor to some of the lands and titles of Adelaide's previous husband, Hermann II, calling himself 'count palatine of the Rhine'. Adelaide and Henry's marriage was childless. Henry adopted Siegfried, Adelaide's younger son from her marriage to Adalbert, as his heir. After Henry's death in 1099, Siegfried succeeded him as count palatine of the Rhine.

== Foundation of Maria Laach Abbey ==
In 1093 Adelaide and her third husband, Henry, founded the abbey of Maria Laach, with property which Adelaide had inherited from her father, Otto. The abbey was dedicated to the Virgin Mary and to Saint Nicholas. Construction work on the abbey was interrupted by Adelaide's death in 1100. It was not until 1112 that Adelaide's son, Siegfried, renewed and completed the building work.

== Seal ==
One of the earliest surviving women's seals is attached to a charter issued by Adelaide in 1097. The seal legend (writing around the edge of the seal) refers to Adelaide as 'Adelaide, countess palatine' (Adelheit palatina comitizsa). The image on the seal depicts the profile bust of a veiled female figure, holding an open book and a fleur-de-lis sceptre ending in a quatrefoil.

== Death ==
Adelaide died in 1100, a year after Henry, while on a pilgrimage to Rome.
