= Adela of Louvain (died 1083) =

German noblewoman (died 1083)

Adela of Louvain (died 1083) was margravine of Meissen and later, margravine of the Saxon Ostmark.

== Life ==
Adela was the daughter of Lambert II of Louvain and Uda of Lorraine (also called Oda of Verdun), daughter of Gothelo I of Lorraine.

Before 1060, Adela of Louvain, married Otto I, Margrave of Meissen, Count of Weimar. After Otto's death in 1067 Eckbert I, Margrave of Meissen attempted to repudiate his own wife, Immilla of Turin in order to marry Adela and secure his hold on the mark of Meissen. Eckbert died in 1068, and the following year, Adela married Dedi I of Lusatia. Dedi also tried to claim the mark of Meissen through marriage to Adela, and rebelled against Henry IV of Germany when Henry refused to invest Dedi with this property. Lampert of Hersfeld depicted Adela as the driving force behind Dedi's rebellion, calling her a “most ferocious wife” (saevissima uxor). According to Lampert, Adela goaded Dedi into action by telling him: “if he were a man, he would not receive this injustice un-avenged, nor would he conduct himself with less courage than her first husband [Otto]”. Lambert adds that it was rumoured that Adela was behind the assassination of Dedi II (Dedi I's son by his first wife, Oda) in 1069.

== Children ==
With her first husband, Otto, Adela had the following children:

- Oda (d.1111), who married Eckbert II of Meissen
- Cunigunda (d.after 1117), who married Yaropolk, son of Iziaslav I of Kiev, then Kuno of Nordheim, and finally Wiprecht von Groitzsch
- Adelaide (d.1100) who, married successively Adalbert II, Count of Ballenstedt, and the counts palatine Herman and Henry.

With her second husband, Dedi, Adela had the following children:

- Henry, who later ruled both Lusatia and Meissen
- Conrad, who died in battle with the Wends.

== Notes ==
Adela of Louvain (died 1083) House of Louvain Born: c. 1025
Regnal titles
Preceded by -	Margravine of Meissen; 1062–1067	Succeeded by Immilla of Turin
Preceded by Oda of the Saxon Ostmark	Margravine of Lower Lusatia c. 1069-1075	Succeeded by Gertrude of Brunswick
