= Egino =

Egino or Egeno may refer to:

- Egino, Duke of Thuringia;
- Egino IV, Count of Urach;
- Egino V, Count of Urach;
- Egino II of Freiburg;
- Egino III of Freiburg;
- Saint Egino, abbot of Augsburg;
- Egino (bishop of Dalby);
- Egino (bishop of Chur);
- Egino (bishop of Constance);
- Egino (bishop of Verona);
- Egino Weinert (1920–2012), German artist.

== See also ==
- Egeno of Konradsburg (disambiguation)
