= Dedi I of the Saxon Ostmark =

Margrave of the Saxon Ostmark from 1046 to 1075

Dedi (or Dedo) (1004 – October 1075) was the Margrave of the Saxon Ostmark (also called Lower Lusatia) from 1046 and a claimant for the title of Margrave of Meissen from 1069. He was the second son of Dietrich II of Wettin and Matilda, daughter of Eckard I of Meissen.

== Life ==
Dedi inherited the Ostmark from its last dynast, the childless Odo II, because he had married his sister, Oda (died before 1068). Oda was herself the widow of William III of Weimar and mother of William and Otto, margraves of Meissen successively. When his stepson Otto died, Dedi married his widow, Adela of Louvain, and in her name claimed the Meissen March.

Otto died in 1067 and was succeeded by Egbert I, but Dedi married his widow in 1069 and rebelled. In claiming the Meissen March through his wife, Dedi was challenging the royal prerogative in the marches. With him in his revolt was Albert II of Ballenstedt, who raided the monastery of Nienburg, a foundation of the family of Dedi's first wife. Adela of Louvain for her part aggressively supported her husband, so much so that Lambert of Hersfeld was compelled to call her a saevissima uxor (rough meaning "raging wife"). Adalbert of Bremen, one of the regents of the young king Henry IV, frustrated the Thuringian rebels and preserved the peace in Thuringia and Meissen. Dedi was confined to Lusatia, where he was succeeded by his eldest son, Dedi II.

== Marriages and issue ==
Dedi and Oda had:

- Dedi II
- Adelaide, who married Ernest, Margrave of Austria.

Dedi and Adela of Brabant, daughter of Lambert II, Count of Louvain, had:

- Henry, who later ruled both Lusatia and Meissen
- Conrad, who died in battle with the Wends.

== Sources ==
- Thompson, James Westfall. Feudal Germany, Volume II. New York: Frederick Ungar Publishing Co., 1928.
- Bernhardt, John W. Itinerant Kingship and Royal Monasteries in Early Medieval Germany, c. 936–1075. Cambridge: Cambridge University Press, 1993.
- Robinson, I. S. (2003). Henry IV of Germany 1056-1106. Cambridge University Press.74

Dedi I of the Saxon Ostmark House of Wettin Born: 1004 Died: October 1075
Preceded by Odo II	Margrave of the Ostmark; 1046–1075	Succeeded by Henry I
