= Odo II of the Saxon Ostmark =

Odo II (died 1032) was the only son of Thietmar, Margrave of the Saxon Ostmark. He succeeded his father in January 1030. All that is known of him is that he left no issue, dying most likely prior to achieving majority. He was succeeded by his brother-in-law, Dedo. The Ostmark, however, was so diminished that nothing remained of it for Dedo save Lower Lusatia.

== Notes ==
| Preceded by Thietmar | Margrave of the Ostmark; 1030–1032 | Succeeded by Dedi I |
