= Adelaide of Ballenstedt =

12th-century German noblewoman

- Born: c. 1100
- Died: after 1139
- Noble family: House of Ascania
- Spouses: Henry IV, Count of Stade; Werner, Count of Osterburg
- Issue: Albert of Osterburg
- Father: Otto of Ballenstedt
- Mother: Eilika of Saxony

Adelaide of Ballenstedt (c. 1100 – after 1139) was the daughter of Otto of Ballenstedt and a member of the House of Ascania. She married, successively, Henry IV, Count of Stade, and Werner, Count of Osterburg.

== Family ==
Adelaide was the only daughter of Otto, Count of Ballenstedt, and Eilika, daughter of Magnus Billung, Duke of Saxony. Her brother was Albert the Bear.

== First Marriage ==
Adelaide's first husband was Henry IV, Count of Stade (d.1128). The couple had no recorded children together.

== Second marriage ==
In 1139 Adelaide married for a second time to Werner of Velthim, count of Osterburg (d. after 1169). According to the Annales Stadenses, Werner was a vassal (vassus) of Adelaide's brother, Albert the Bear. With Werner, Adelaide had at least one son: Albert of Osterburg.
