= Meisdorf =

- Ortsteil of Falkenstein/Harz
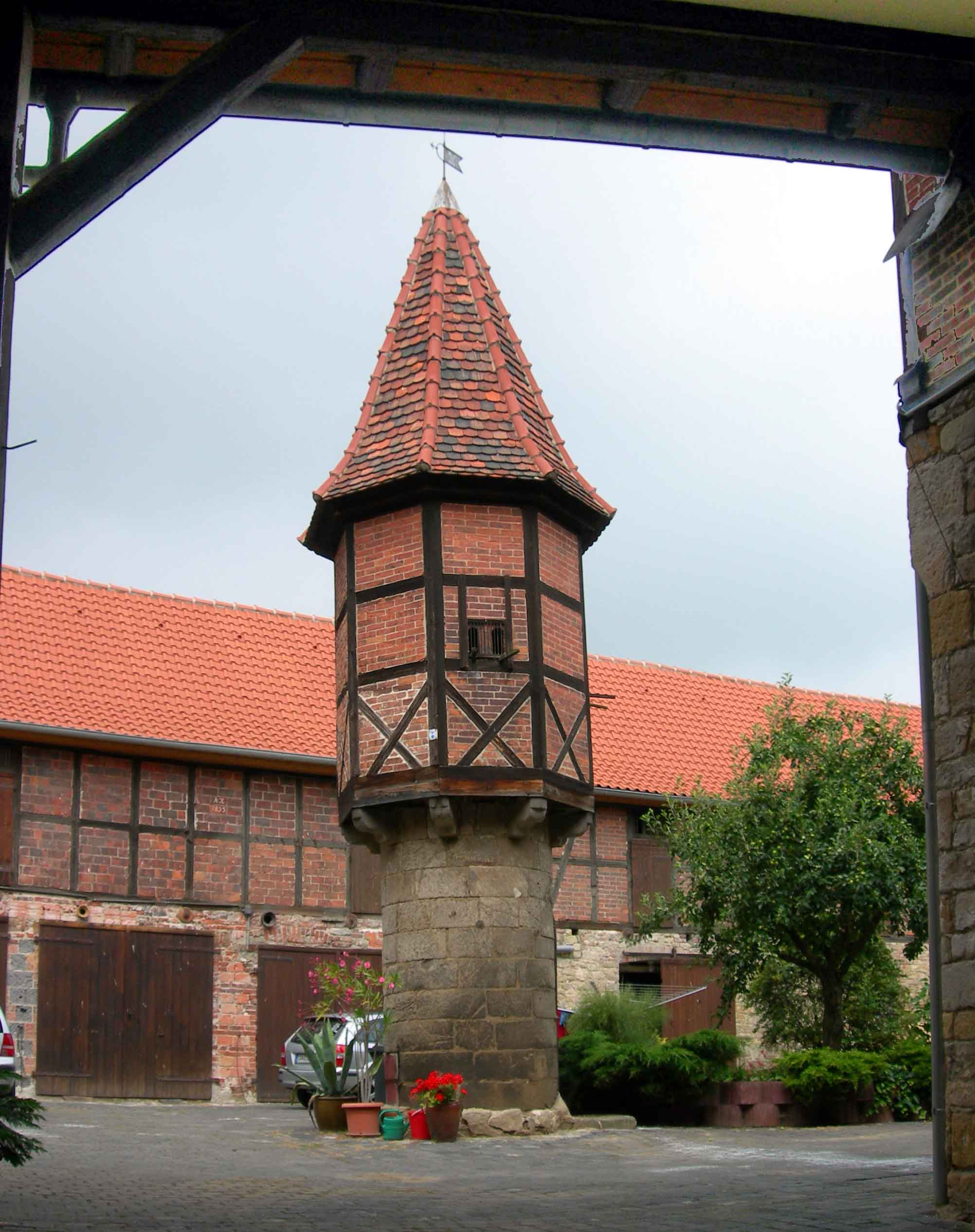
- The dovecote (Taubenturm) in Meisdorfer Hof

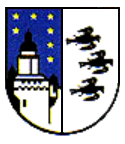
- Coat of arms
- Interactive map of Meisdorf
- Location within Germany Location within Saxony-Anhalt
- Coordinates: 51°42′37″N 11°17′39″E
- Country: Germany
- State: Saxony-Anhalt
- District: Harz
- Town: Falkenstein/Harz
- Elevation: 177 m (581 ft)

Population (2020-12-31)
  - Total: 1,122
- Time zone: UTC+01:00 (CET)
  - Summer (DST): UTC+02:00 (CEST)
- Postal codes: 06463
- Dialling codes: 034743

Meisdorf is a village in the town of Falkenstein/Harz in the district of Harz in the German state of Saxony-Anhalt.

== Location ==
Meisdorf lies at the eastern foot of the Harz Mountains in the east of the Harz/Saxony-Anhalt Nature Park at around 200 m above sea level (NN). The River Selke flows through it and forms a valley (Selketal) in the Lower Harz and Mansfeld Land. Southwest of Meisdorf above the river lies the ruins of Anhalt Castle, the preserved medieval castle of Falkenstein and the sites of Old Falkenstein Castle and the Ackeburg.

== Literature ==
- Sven Frotscher: Burg Falkenstein und Schloß Meisdorf. Ed. Leipzig, Leipzig, 1995, ISBN 3-361-00434-9
- Heimatverein Meisdorf (ed.): Chronik der Gemeinde Meisdorf. Meisdorf, 2005 (self-publication)
