= Otto I, Margrave of Meissen =

Margrave of Meissen from 1062 to 1067

Otto I was the Margrave of Meissen from 1062 until his death in 1067, and the second Margrave of the family of the counts of Weimar and Orlamünde. He was a younger son of William III of Weimar and Oda, daughter of Thietmar, Margrave of the Saxon Ostmark. He inherited Orlamünde from his father in 1039 and Weimar from his brother William in 1062. He was appointed by the Emperor Henry IV to succeed William in Meissen as well. He became Advocate of the Cathedral of Merseburg in 1066.

He married Adela of Louvain, daughter of Lambert II, Count of Louvain, son of Lambert I of Louvain, before 1060. She gave him three daughters:

- Oda, the eldest, married Egbert II of Meissen
- Cunigunda, who married Yaropolk, son of Iziaslav I of Kiev, then Kuno of Nordheim, and finally Wiprecht von Groitzsch
- Adelaide, the youngest, married successively Adalbert II, Count of Ballenstedt, and the counts palatine Herman and Henry.

When he died, she remarried to Dedi I of Lusatia, Otto's stepfather.

== Sources ==
- Thompson, James Westfall (1928). Feudal Germany, Volume II. New York: Frederick Ungar Publishing Co.

| Preceded by William | Margrave of Meissen; 1062–1067 | Succeeded by Egbert I |
