= William II of Weimar =

William II the Great (c. 940/945 – 24 December 1003) was Count of Weimar from 963 and Duke of Thuringia from 1002.

He was the eldest son of Count William I of Weimar.

== Family ==
By an unknown wife, he had children:

- William III (died 16 April 1039)
- Poppo (died 13 July before 1044)
- Agnes, who likely married Frederick I, Count Palatine of Saxony
