= Steinfurtbach =

River in Germany

Location
- Country: Germany
- State: Saxony-Anhalt

Physical characteristics
- Mouth
  - location: Selke
  - coordinates: 51°39′47″N 10°59′59″E

Basin features
- Progression: Selke→ Bode→ Saale→ Elbe→ North Sea

The Steinfurtbach is a river of Saxony-Anhalt, Germany, and a left tributary of the Selke. It flows into the Selke near Güntersberge.

== See also ==
- List of rivers of Saxony-Anhalt
