= Schwefelbach =

River in Germany

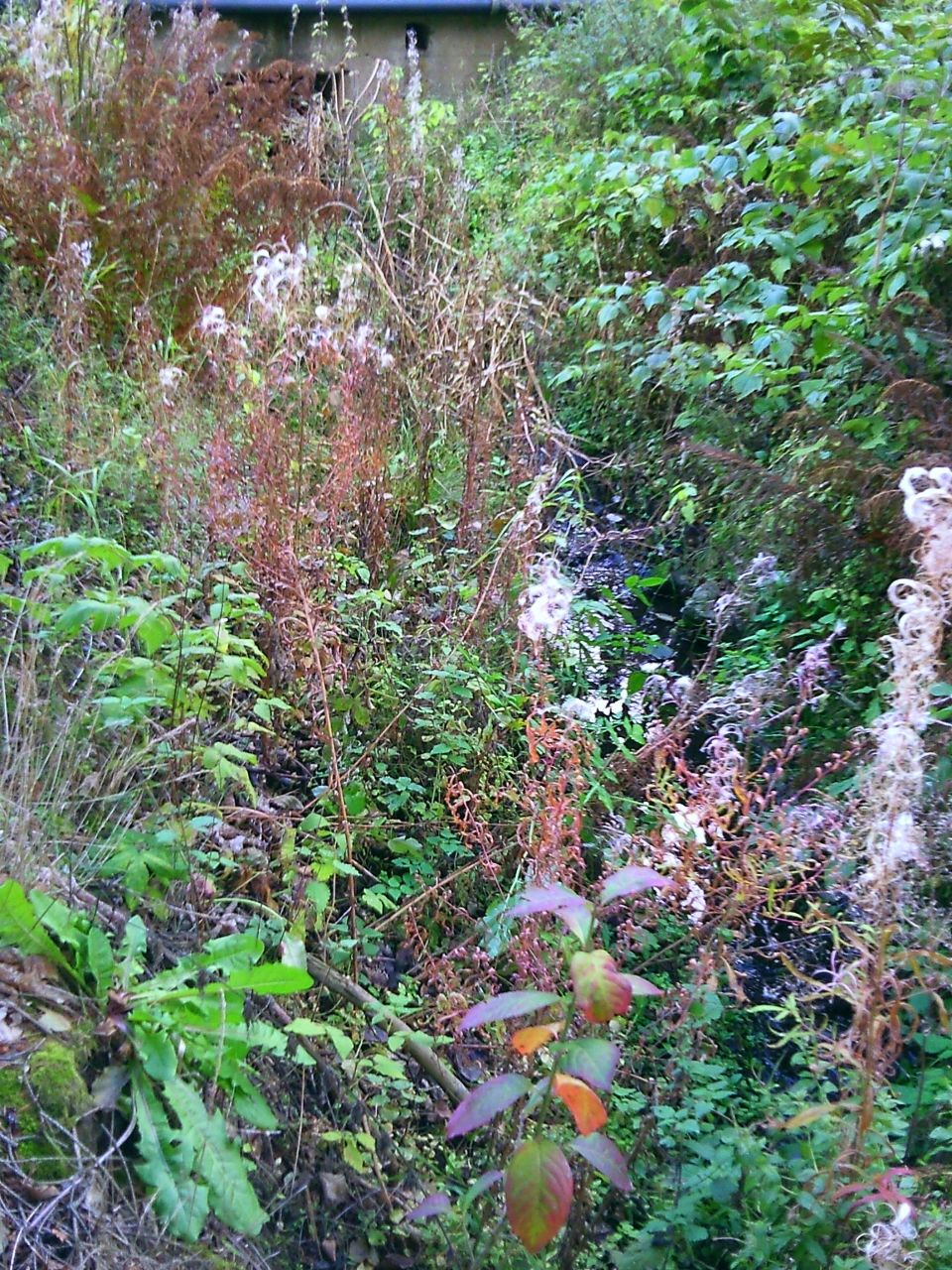

Location
- Country: Germany
- State: Saxony-Anhalt

Physical characteristics
- Mouth
  - location: Selke
  - coordinates: 51.6458°N 11.1129°E

Basin features
- Progression: Selke→ Bode→ Saale→ Elbe→ North Sea

Schwefelbach is a river in Saxony-Anhalt, Germany that flows into the Selke in Alexisbad.

== See also ==
- List of rivers of Saxony-Anhalt
