= Friedenstalbach =

River in Germany

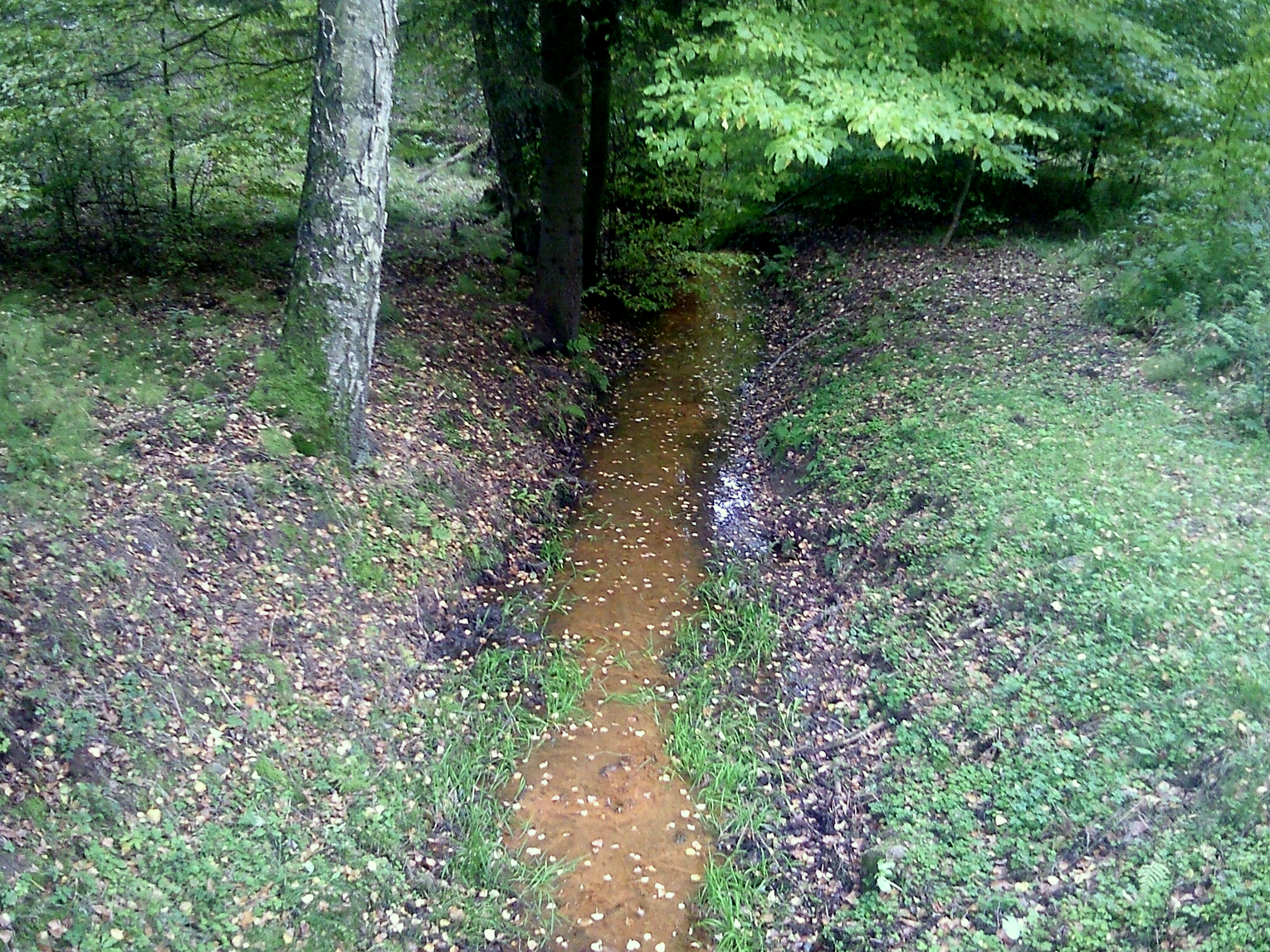

Location
- Country: Germany
- State: Saxony-Anhalt

Physical characteristics
- Mouth
  - location: Selke
  - coordinates: 51.6562°N 11.1181°E

Basin features
- Progression: Selke→ Bode→ Saale→ Elbe→ North Sea

Friedenstalbach is a small river of Saxony-Anhalt, Germany. It flows into the Selke near Alexisbad.

== See also ==
- List of rivers of Saxony-Anhalt
