= Falkenstein, Saxony-Anhalt =

Falkenstein/Harz
- Town
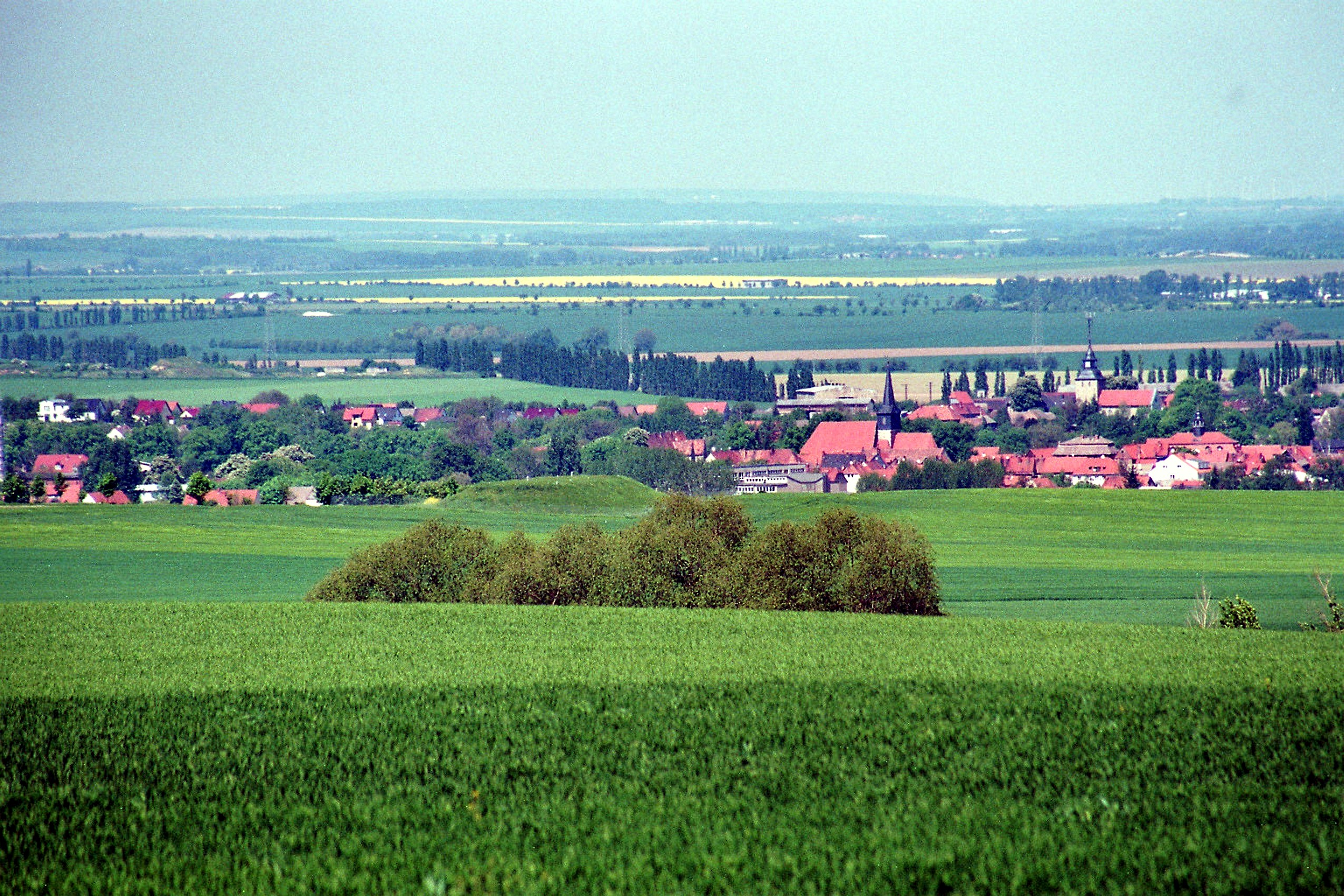
- View to Ermsleben

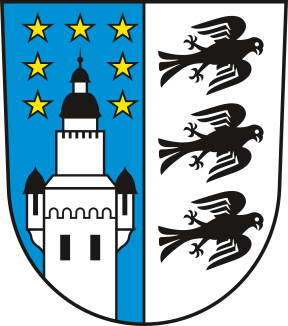
- Coat of arms

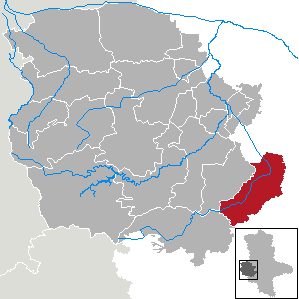
- Location of Falkenstein/Harz within Harz district
- Interactive map of Falkenstein/Harz
- Location within Germany Location within Saxony-Anhalt
- Coordinates: 51°44′N 11°20′E
- Country: Germany
- State: Saxony-Anhalt
- District: Harz
- Subdivisions: 7

Government
  - Mayor (2023–30): Rico Röse

Area
  - Total: 102.97 km^{2} (39.76 sq mi)
- Elevation: 149–383 m (489–1,257 ft)

Population (2025-12-31)
  - Total: 4,899
  - Density: 47.58/km^{2} (123.2/sq mi)
- Time zone: UTC+01:00 (CET)
  - Summer (DST): UTC+02:00 (CEST)
- Postal codes: 06333, 06463, 06543
- Dialling codes: 034741, 034742, 034743, 039245
- Vehicle registration: HZ
- Website: www.stadt-falkenstein- harz.de

Falkenstein/Harz (German pronunciation: [ˈfalkn̩ˌʃtaɪn]) is a town in the Harz district, in Saxony-Anhalt, Germany. It was created in 2002 by merging the town of Ermsleben with the former municipalities of Endorf, Meisdorf, Neuplatendorf, Pansfelde, Reinstedt und Wieserode. The new community was named after Falkenstein Castle.

== Geography ==
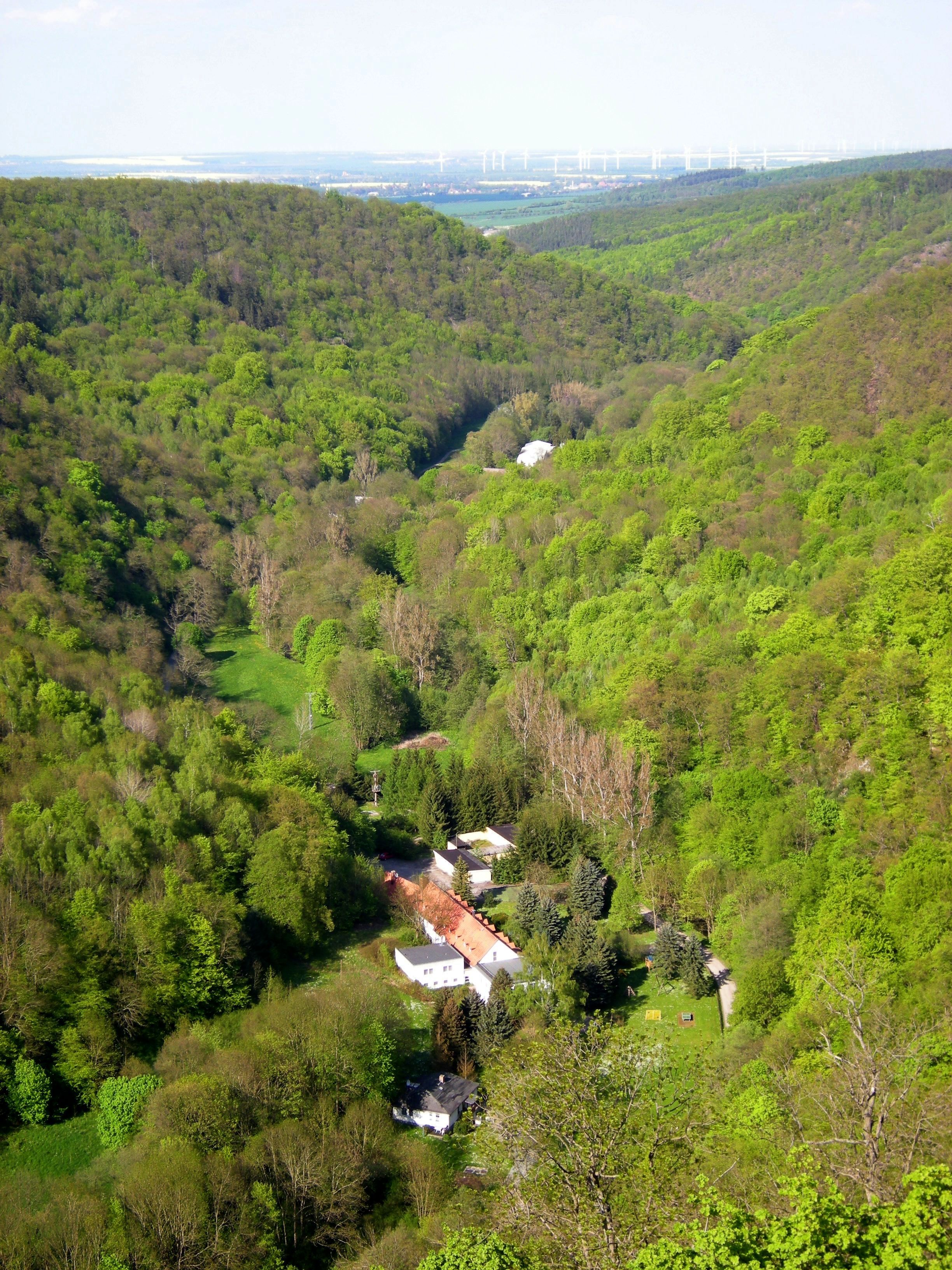
View from Falkenstein Castle down the Selke valley

The town is situated on the northeastern edge of the Harz mountain range, about 10 km (6.2 mi) west of Aschersleben. The municipal area stretches from the lower Selke valley down to the northern Harz foothills.

Reinstedt, Ermsleben and Meisdorf were stops on the Frose–Quedlinburg railway line which was closed in 2004. Falkenstein Castle is a point on the southern route of the Romanesque Road.

Until the Saxony-Anhalt administrative reform of 2007, Falkenstein belonged to Aschersleben-Staßfurt district.

== History ==
While the settlements of Endorf, Reinstedt and Wieserode in the Saxon Schwabengau were already mentioned in the 10th century, Ermsleben is documented as Anegremislebo in a 1045 deed, then a possession held by the edelfrei Lords of Konradsburg Castle. In 1070 one Egeno I of Konradsburg accused the mighty Saxon count Otto of Nordheim of a conspiracy against King Henry IV. About ten years later, his grandson Egeno II killed the Ascanian count Adalbert II of Ballenstedt; for the atonement, his castle was converted into a Benedictine abbey. About 1120 the Konradsburg dynasty erected Falkenstein Castle as new ancestral seat.

Under the rule of the Ascanian count Henry I (c. 1170 – 1252), the Schwabengau estates became the nucleus of the Anhalt principality, named after Anhalt Castle in the upper Selke valley. Ermsleben already appeared as a town (oppidum) in 1298. When the Princes of Anhalt-Aschersleben became extinct in 1315, their estates fell to the Bishops of Halberstadt. In 1437 the Falkenstein lands passed to the House of Asseburg as a fief.

Attacked and plundered in the German Peasants' War of 1525, Ermsleben was vested with market rights by Emperor Charles V in 1530. While its citizens turned Protestant and the Halberstadt prince-bishopric was ruled by Brandenburg and Brunswick-Lüneburg administrators, the town was devastated in the Thirty Years' War. According to the 1648 Peace of Westphalia, it became part of the secularized Principality of Halberstadt, a province of Brandenburg-Prussia.

== Politics ==
Seats in the town council (Stadtrat) as of 2014 local elections:

- Christian Democratic Union of Germany (CDU): 8
- Bürgerforum Falkenstein (independent): 3
- Social Democratic Party of Germany (SPD): 2
- The Left: 2
- Alternative Junges Forum und Robin Hood (independent): 2
- Kommunale Wählervereinigung (independent): 1
- Wir Reinstedter (independent): 1
- Individual candidate: 1

== Notable people ==
- Johann Wilhelm Ludwig Gleim (1719–1803), poet, born in Ermsleben
- Werner Sombart (1863–1941), economist and sociologist, born in Ermsleben
