= Old Falkenstein Castle =

German castle

- Burg Alt-Falkenstein
- Falkenstein/Harz
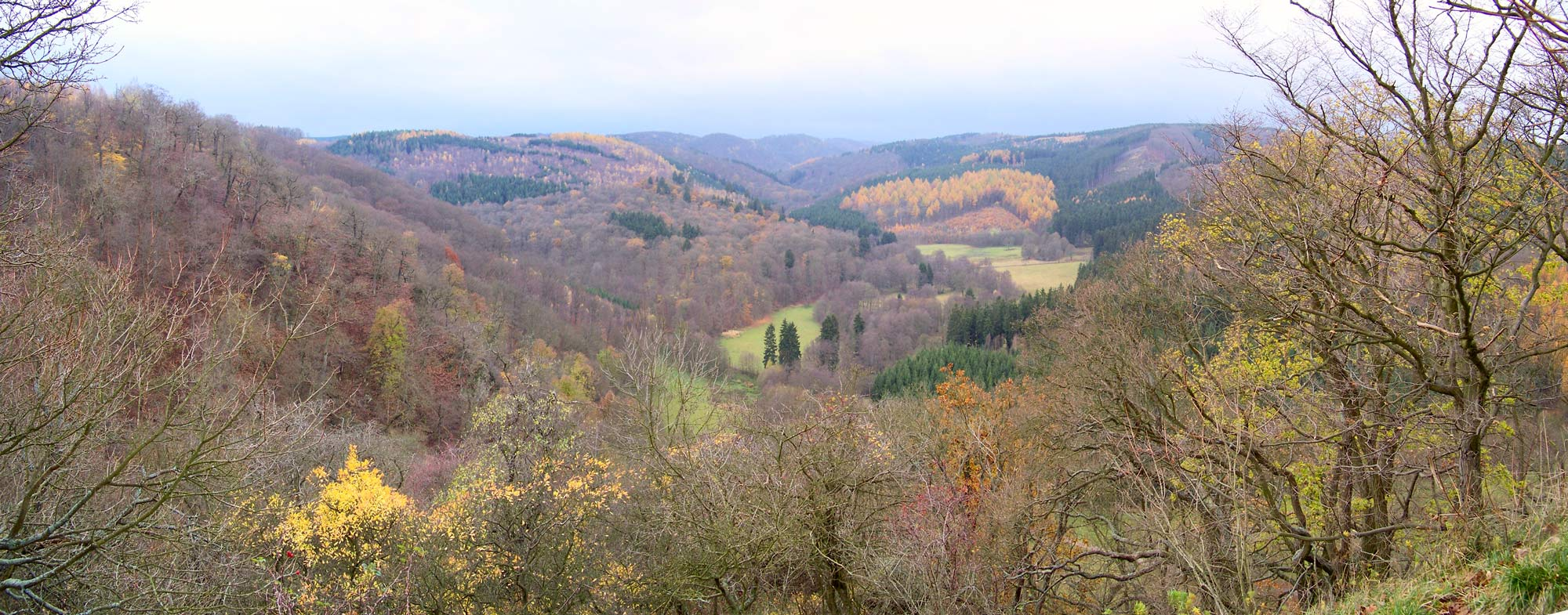
- View of the Selke valley from the castle site

Site information
- Type: hill castle
- Code: DE-ST
- Condition: castle ruins, circular ditch (Ringgraben), advance rampart (Vorwall), wall remnants

Location
- Coordinates: 51°40′48″N 11°14′23″E
- Height: 335.6 m above sea level (NN)

Site history
- Built: 11th century A.D.

Old Falkenstein Castle (German: Burg Alter Falkenstein or Burg Alt-Falkenstein) in the Harz Mountains of Germany is the castle site or burgstall of a high medieval hill castle. It lies on the territory of Falkenstein/Harz in the state of Saxony-Anhalt in the district of Harz. It was built in the 11th century A.D. and destroyed in 1115.

== Location ==
The ruins of Old Falkenstein are located in the eastern Harz region of Mansfeld Land between Mägdesprung (north of Harzgerode) and Meisdorf (southwest of Falkenstein/Harz) on a rocky ridge (335.6 m above sea level (NN)) above the valley of the River Selke. In the forested landscape of the Harz/Saxony-Anhalt Nature Park, it lies within the nature reserve of Selketal ("Selke Valley") about 1.25 kilometres (0.78 mi) northwest of the Köhlerhütte, which itself is northwest of Pansfelde near Kreisstraße 1344. From there woodland paths run over the Hirschplatte, up to 364.2 m above NN, to the ruins.

About 1.8 kilometres (1.1 mi) east-northeast lies New Falkenstein Castle, a preserved medieval ridgetop castle.

== History ==
The castle was probably built under the lordship of the German Emperor Henry IV. Its architect was the Swabian cleric and later bishop, Benno II of Osnabrück. After the Battle of Welfesholz on 11 February 1115 the castle was slighted under the direction of the Saxon duke, Lothair of Süpplingenburg and was never rebuilt. Afterwards the neighbouring castle of New Falkenstein was built, and the Old Falkenstein was probably no longer occupied from the beginning of the 12th century, as surviving pottery shards indicate.

== Layout ==
The castle site consisted of an oval inner ward, roughly 25 by 65 metres (82 ft × 213 ft) in size, as well as a narrow outer ward about 85 metres (279 ft) long, the whole site extending over some 200 metres (660 ft) in length. Today, elements of the circular moat (Ringgraben) and advanced rampart (Vorwall) as well as remnants of the northern ring wall (Ringmauer) are still visible.

From the rocky ridge of the ruined castle there are views of the Selke valley. A cross recalls the fatal accident here on 11 July 2003 of local history researcher and area monument curator, Hans Reißmann.

== Literature ==
- Friedrich Stolberg: Befestigungsanlagen im und am Harz – Von der Frühgeschichte bis zur Neuzeit, Verlag August Lax, Issue 2/1983, ISBN 3826910028
