= William III of Weimar =

William III of Weimar (Wilhelmi Thuringorum praetor; German (Died 16 April 1039) was count of Weimar from 1003 and of the Eichsfeld from 1022.

== History ==
William III was the youngest son of Count William II of Weimar. His German name was Wilhelm. He had two siblings, a brother, Poppo and a sister named Agnes who married Frederick, Count Palatine of Saxony.

After William father, William II of Weimar, died on 24 December 1003, he inherited the margravate of Weimar. Together with his Brother Poppo he owned Lands in Großenlupnitz north of Gotha. Under him the House of Weimar reached it's height in Thuringia, which was also partly facilitated by the advance of the Ekkehardingers into the March. The Saxon Annalist known as Annalista Saxo, called him "Magnus Wilhelmus de Wimmare", a title he rarely gave to a Count.

William was on good terms with the King, so between 1014 and 1015 he carried out royal assignments, including guarding of Meissen Castle. He would continue this assignment several times.

In 1017 he was in conflict with Gebhard of Querfurt. This conflict however was resolved by the King of Allstedt.

In 1022 he won the comital rights to Eichsfeld, and through them he became the most powerful man in Thuringia. However, through this he got into conflict with the archbishops of Mainz.

William died on 16 April 1039. He left four sons by his second wife, Oda. His oldest son WIlliam IV necame the new Margarve of Weimar, while his second son Otto became the new Margrave of Orlamünde. After his death his widow remarried, this time to Dedo I of Wettin.

== Family ==
William III was married twice. His first marriage was to a woman named Bertha, but the marriage ended childless. His second marriage was to Oda (probably the daughter of Thietmar, Margrave of the Saxon Ostmark). They had four sons:

  - William IV (died 1062), Margrave of Meissen from 1046
  - Otto I (died 1067), count of Orlamünde
  - Poppo (died after 1046)
  - Aribo (murdered in 1070)

After his death Oda remarried, this time to Dedi I, Margrave of Lusatia.
