= Falkenstein Castle (Harz) =

Castle in Saxony-Anhalt, Germany

- Burg Falkenstein
- Falkenstein, Saxony-Anhalt
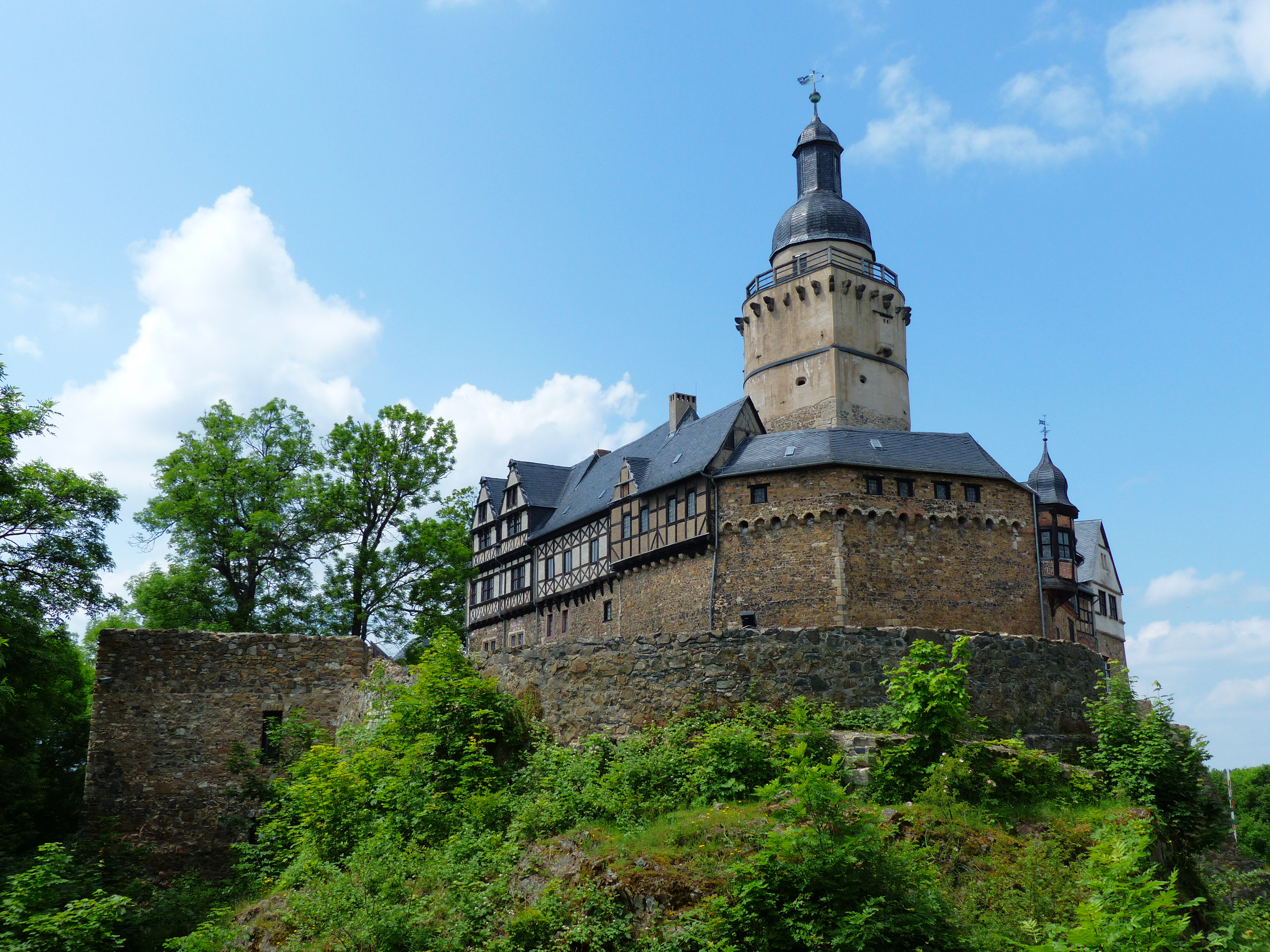
- Falkenstein Castle

Site information
- Type: Hilltop castle
- Condition: Preserved or largely preserved

Location
- Location within Saxony-Anhalt Location within Germany
- Coordinates: 51°40′54″N 11°15′54″E

Site history
- Built: 1120 to 1150

Falkenstein Castle (German: Burg Falkenstein), also formerly called New Falkenstein Castle (Burg Neuer Falkenstein) to distinguish it from Old Falkenstein Castle, is a German hill castle in the Harz Mittelgebirge, dating to the High Middle Ages. It is located in the town of Falkenstein between Aschersleben and Harzgerode.

== Location ==
The castle lies at a height of about 320 m (1,050 ft) above the Selke valley near the village of Meisdorf in the Harz district, in the German state of Saxony-Anhalt. It is located within extended forests, today a protected area (Naturschutzgebiet). Also nearby are the ruined medieval castles of Ackeburg and Old Falkenstein Castle.

== History ==
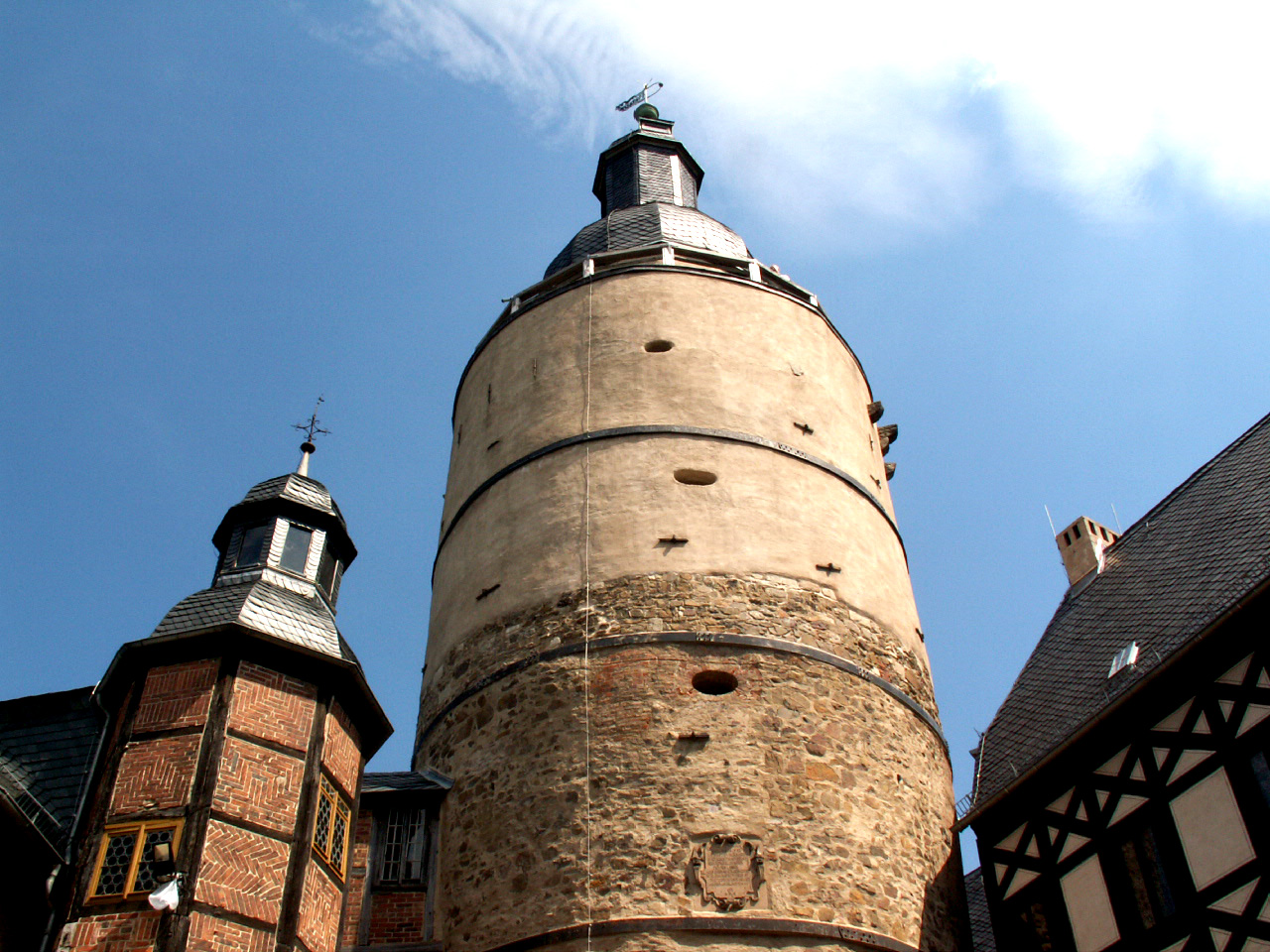
Falkenstein keep

Falkenstein was built between 1120 and 1150 by the lords of the Konradsburg who henceforth styled themselves as Grafen von Falkenstein (Counts).

According to legend, Falkenstein Castle has its origins in a murder: around 1080, the Saxon nobleman Egeno II of Konradsburg slew Count Adalbert II of Ballenstedt in a fight, whereupon the murderer was allegedly made to give up his family seat to be converted into a monastery. As a result, Egeno's son, Burchard of Konradsburg, had the new Falkenstein Castle built.

In 1220, during the reign of Prince Henry of Anhalt the Anhalt ministerialis, Eike of Repgow, from what is now Reppichau, drew up the Sachsenspiegel the first German law book here. The book is dedicated to its commissioner, Hoyer of Falkenstein. In 1437 the castle was given as a fief by the Bishopric of Halberstadt to the House of Asseburg, in whose hands the castle remained until its confiscation after the Second World War.

The castle was one of several backdrops in the seven-part children's series shot by GDR television, Spuk unterm Riesenrad, and one of the locations for the DEFA fairy tale film Schneeweißchen and Rosenrot ("Snow White and Rose Red"), as well as featuring in the Polizeiruf 110 episode Die Entdeckung.

== Description ==
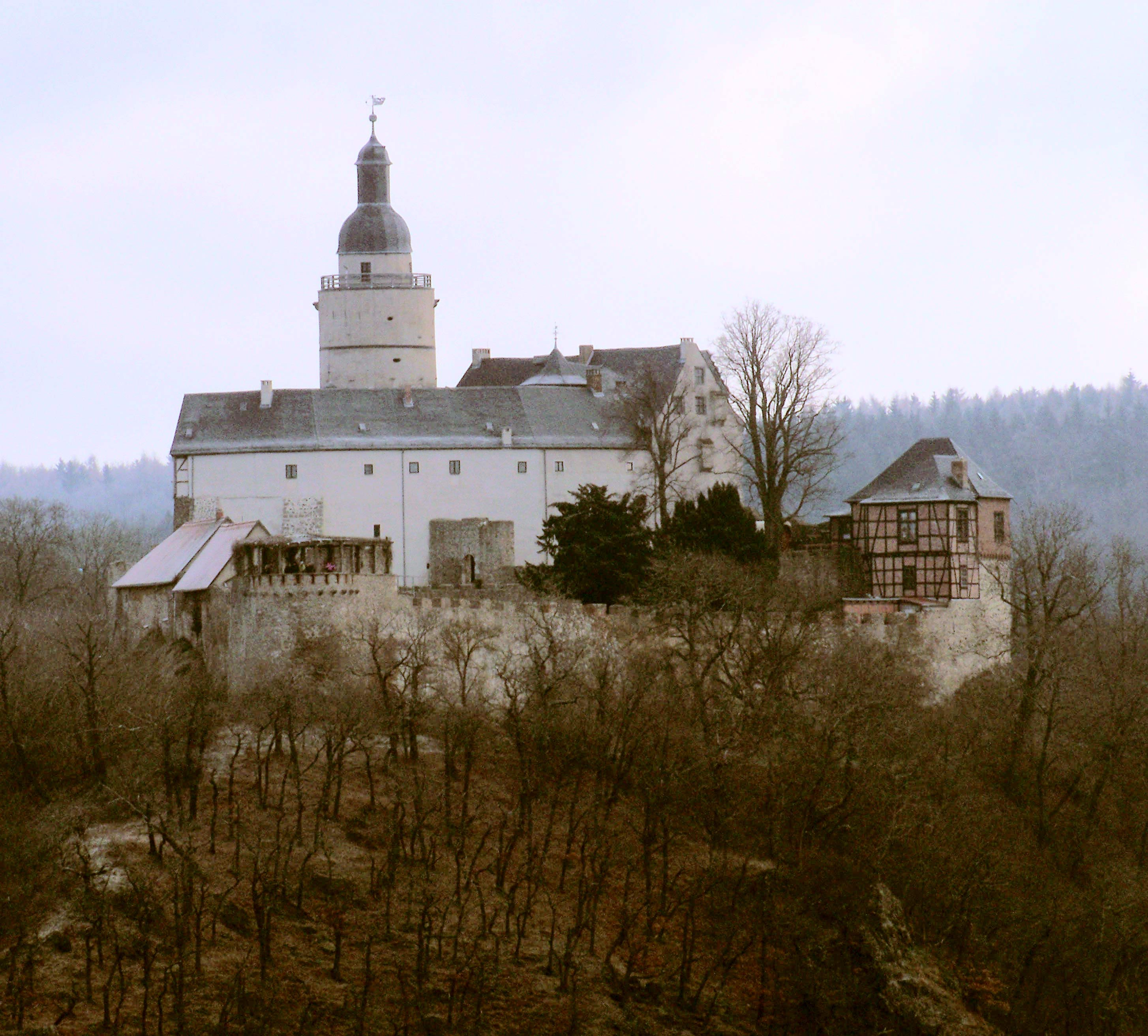
Falkenstein Castle viewed from the Selkesicht

The original Falkenstein Castle was built between 1120 and 1150 in Romanesque style. Although it has been modified frequently since then, notably in the mid-16th century, it still retains the character of a medieval castle.

The castle was protected by seven gates and five zwingers. The side at which the main attacks were anticipated had a 17 metre high shield wall.

The castle site covers an area of about 310 × 90 metres. Its inner bailey, the gate and zwinger together with three outer baileys cover about 40 × 40 metres. In the centre of the inner bailey is the 31-metre-high bergfried whose walls have a thickness of 8.5 metres at a height of 2 metres. It is used today as an observation tower and is open to the public.

Originally, a wooden bridge used to connect the bergfried about 9 metres above the ground to the palas located in the northwest corner. Later (Gothic) alterations connected the buildings.

== Present use ==
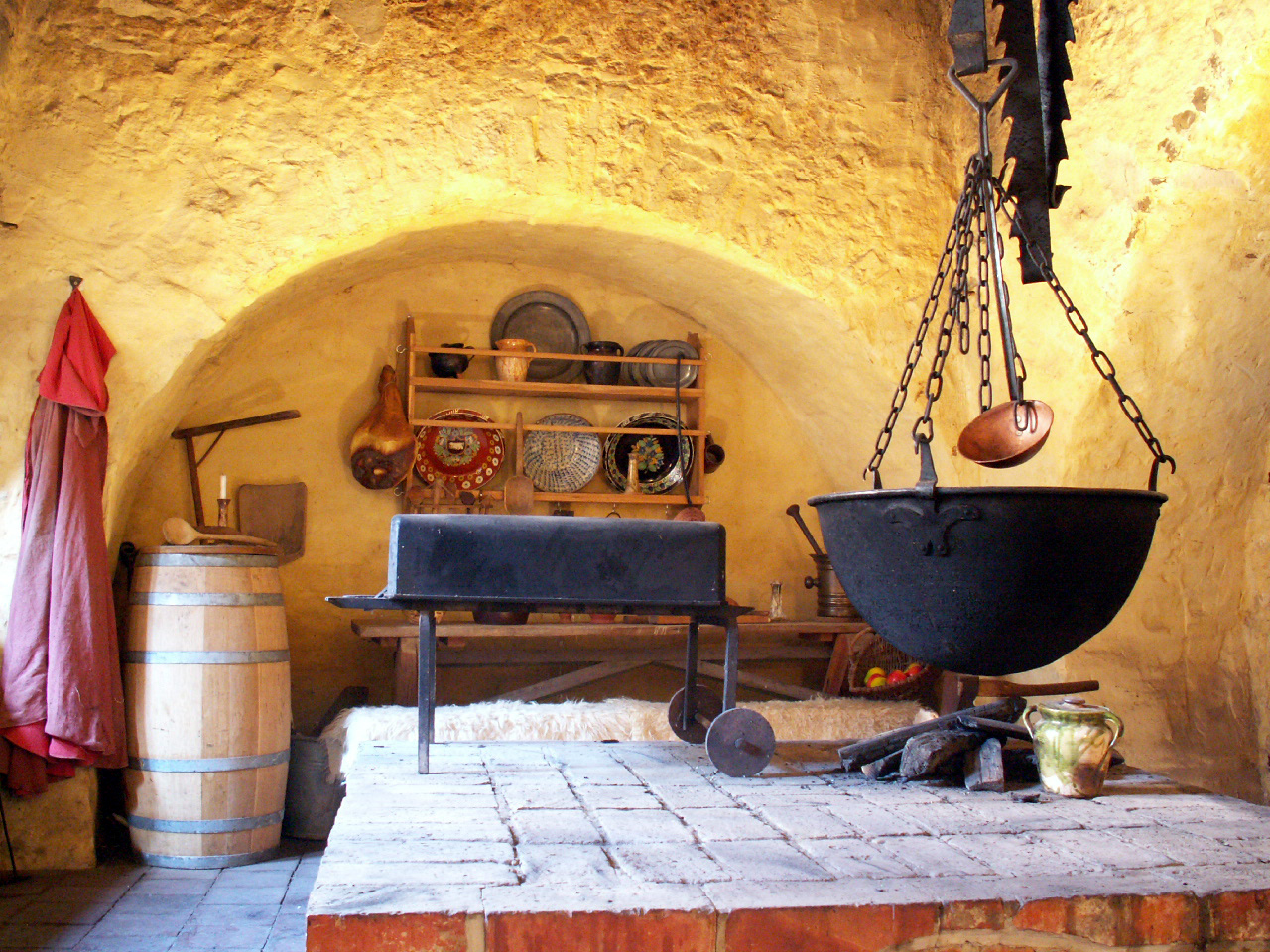
Old kitchen

Today the castle houses a museum and is used as a venue for events. It is part of the Romanesque Road, a tourist route. The castle has a falconry and a restaurant that offers traditional 'knightly' food (Ritteressen).

The castle is No. 200 in the network of hiking checkpoints known as the Harzer Wandernadel.

== See also ==
- List of castles in Saxony-Anhalt

== Sources ==
- Sven Frotscher (1995), Burg Falkenstein and Schloss Meisdorf (in German), Leipzig: Ed. Leipzig, ISBN 3-361-00434-9
- Boje Schmuhl, ed. (2006), Burg Falkenstein (in German), Dössel: Stekovics, ISBN 978-3-89923-131-1
- Winfried Korf (1997), Burg Falkenstein (in German), Wettin: Stekovics, ISBN 3-929330-79-2
- Berent Schwineköper (Hrsg.): Provinz Saxony Anhalt. In: Handbuch der Historischen Stätten Deutschlands. Band 11. Alfred Kröner Verlag, Stuttgart 1987, p. 117–118, ISBN 3-520-31402-9
