= Eilika of Saxony =

Countess of Ballenstedt

- Born: c. 1080
- Died: 16 January 1142
- Noble family: Billung
- Spouse: Otto of Ballenstedt
- Issue: Albert the Bear; Adelaide of Ballenstedt
- Father: Magnus, Duke of Saxony
- Mother: Sophia of Hungary

Eilika of Saxony (c. 1080 – 16 January 1142) was a daughter of Magnus, Duke of Saxony and a member of the Billung dynasty. Through marriage to Otto of Ballenstedt, she was countess of Ballenstedt.

== Life ==
Eilika was the younger daughter of Magnus, Duke of Saxony and Sophia, daughter of King Béla I of Hungary. Since Eilika had no brothers, after her father's death in 1106, Eilika and her sister, Wulfhilde of Saxony, inherited his property. Eilika received property in Bernburg, Weißenfels, Werben and perhaps also in Burgwerden and Kreichau, as well as the Palatinate of Saxony.

In 1130 Eilika was in conflict with the citizens of the city of Halle, probably because of her support for Archbishop Norbert of Magdeburg. Fighting broke out, during which Conrad of Eichstadt was killed, and from which Eilika only escaped with difficulty. Around 1131 Eilika wrested the advocacy of the monastery of Goseck (monastery) from Louis of Thuringia, and took it for herself. In 1133 Eilika expelled Abbot Bertold from Goseck for incompetency. In 1134 she introduced his successor, Abbot Penther, to the abbey with a solemn address to the monks. In 1138 Eilika was accused of tyranny (tyrannis), and attacked at her castle of Bernburg.

== Marriage and children ==
Eilika married Count Otto of Ballenstedt before 1095. With Otto, Eilika had two children: Albert the Bear and Adelaide of Ballenstedt, who married Henry II, Margrave of the Nordmark.

== Sources ==
- Fuhrmann, Horst (1995). Germany in the High Middle Ages: C.1050-1200. Translated by Reuter, Timothy. Cambridge University Press.
- A. Thiele, Erzählende genealogische Stammtafeln zur europäischen Geschichte" Band I, Teilband 1 Deutsche Kaiser-, Königs-, Herzogs- und Grafenhäuser I
- H. Assing, Die frühen Askanier und ihre Frauen (Bernburg, 2002).
- L. Partenheimer, Albrecht der Bär. Gründer der Mark Brandenburg und des Fürstentums Anhalt. (Böhlau Verlag Köln Weimar Wien, 2001).
