= Egeno I of Konradsburg =

Egeno I of Konradsburg (also Conradsburg) was one of the free knights (Edelfrei) of Konradsburg, in the northeast of the Harz region of Germany, near Ermsleben.

In 1070, Egeno I claimed publicly that he knew of a conspiracy by the Saxon counts and the Duke of Bavaria, Otto II of Northeim, against King Henry IV and, as part of this, had even received an order to murder the king. The aim of this ploy was apparently the complete disempowerment of the Duke of Bavaria and expropriation of his estates, giving Henry IV easy access to the Saxon and Thuringian lands. As Otto himself refused the consequent ordeal - a duel with Egeno who was of much lower standing in the social order and of bad reputation - the imperial ban was imposed on him. Otto took up arms in alliance with Magnus Billung but was defeated in 1071 and was imprisoned for a time.

Count Giso II of the House of Giso and Count Adalbert of Schauenburg were named as the instigator and author of the conspiracy. They were supposed to have concocted the plan, probably with the knowledge of Henry IV, drawn up the indictment and publicised it through Egeno, whom they had bribed. Giso and Adalbert were killed in 1073 by Otto's henchmen at the Giso Castle of Hollende.

Egeno was blinded in 1073 as a punishment for robbery and then travelled through the land as a beggar.

== Probable family tree ==
- Egino (Agino) of Kakelingen, appeared in 944, probably as the ancestor of the lords of Konradsburg
  - Burkhard I of Kakelingen
    - Egeno I of Konradsburg (before 1021–1089?), the Elder, cousin of Alvericus de Kakelinge from the house of the counts of Plötzkau; evidence of barter in 1021
      - Burchard II of Konradsburg (1054–1109), the Elder
        - Egeno II of Konradsburg (before 1076–1131?), the Younger (he was supposed to have been killed in 1080 by Adalbert II of Ballenstedt)
          - Burchard of Konradsburg, the Younger
