= Otto, Count of Ballenstedt =

Count of Ballenstedt (c.1070–1123)

- Born: c. 1070
- Died: 9 February 1123
- Noble family: House of Ascania
- Spouse: Eilika of Saxony
- Issue: Albert the Bear; Adelaide of Ballenstedt
- Father: Adalbert II, Count of Ballenstedt
- Mother: Adelaide of Weimar-Orlamünde

Otto, Count of Ballenstedt, called Otto the Rich (c. 1070 – 9 February 1123), was the first Ascanian prince to call himself count of Anhalt, and was also briefly named duke of Saxony. He was the father of Albert the Bear, who later conquered Brandenburg from the Slavs and called himself its first margrave.

== Family and background ==
Otto was the eldest son of Adalbert II, Count of Ballenstedt and Adelaide of Weimar-Orlamünde, daughter of Otto I, Margrave of Meissen. His brother Siegfried became Count Palatine of the Rhine. Their father was killed between 1077 and 1083. Otto inherited the family's position in eastern Saxony.

Otto married Eilika of Saxony, a daughter of Magnus, Duke of Saxony, probably between 1095 and 1100.

== Saxon dukedom and imperial politics ==
After the death of his father-in-law, Duke Magnus of Saxony, in 1106, Otto inherited a significant part of Magnus' properties, and hoped to succeed him as duke. However, Lothar of Supplinburg was named duke in his stead. In 1112, after Lothar had been banned, Otto was appointed duke of Saxony by Emperor Henry V; but in the same year, he came into a dispute with the emperor and was stripped of his ducal title. He now allied himself with Lothar, and helped Lothar defeat Count Hoyer I of Mansfeld, who had been named duke of Saxony by the emperor, in 1115.

Otto conquered the areas around Zerbst and Salzwedel from Slavs.

== Fighting near Köthen ==
Medieval chronicles associate Otto with fighting against Slavic forces near Köthen on 9 February 1115, shortly before the Saxons defeated the imperial army at the Battle of Welfesholz. The ''Annalista Saxo'' reports that Otto's 60 German fighters defeated 2,800 Slavs, killing more than 1,700.

== Ballenstedt Abbey and death ==
In 1123 Otto and his son Albert re-established the religious community at Ballenstedt as an independent Benedictine abbey, appointing Johannes, a monk from Berge Abbey near Magdeburg, as its first abbot. Otto died shortly afterward and was buried in the church at Ballenstedt.

== Family ==
Otto married Eilika of Saxony. They had the following children:

- Albert the Bear (1100–1170)
- Adelaide of Ballenstedt (also called Adelheid), who married first Henry of Stade, Margrave of the Northern March (died 1128), and subsequently Werner of Veltheim, associated with the counts of Osterburg.

== Sources ==
- Fuhrmann, Horst (1995). Germany in the High Middle Ages: C.1050-1200. Translated by Reuter, Timothy. Cambridge University Press.
- Loud, Graham A.; Schenk, Jochen, eds. (2017). The Origins of the German Principalities, 1100-1350: Essays by German Historians. Routledge.
