= Thietmar, Margrave of the Saxon Ostmark =

Count of the Schwabengau and Nordthüringgau, Margrave of the Eastern Saxon March

Thietmar (IV) (born ca. 1000; died 10 January 1030) was the Count of the Schwabengau and Nordthüringgau from 1010 and the Margrave of the Saxon Ostmark from 1015 until his death. He was the son and successor of Margrave Gero II. His mother was Adelaide.

In 1028, the Ostmark, with the rest of the eastern marches of the Duchy of Saxony fell under attack from Mieszko II of Poland. The Emperor Conrad II rushed from central Saxony and trekked over very wild terrain to besiege the Poles in Bautzen. Meanwhile, Bretislaus, son of Oldrich of Bohemia, invaded and conquered the March of Moravia, which had been lost to Bohemia since 1003. Conrad, however, failed to take Bautzen (1029) and returned to the Rhineland by wintertime, leaving the defences of the realm in the hands of Dietrich II of Wettin and Thietmar, who died early in January. On his death, Mieszko attacked and destroyed some hundred German villages. The setback was severe: the east of the Ostmark was lost.

He was buried in Helmarshausen. Thietmar was succeeded by his son Odo II. He left a daughter, Oda, who married William III of Weimar and then Dedo II of Wettin, who succeeded her brother Odo.

Preceded by Gero II	Margrave of the Ostmark; 1015–1030	Succeeded by Odo II
