= Selke (river) =

River in Germany

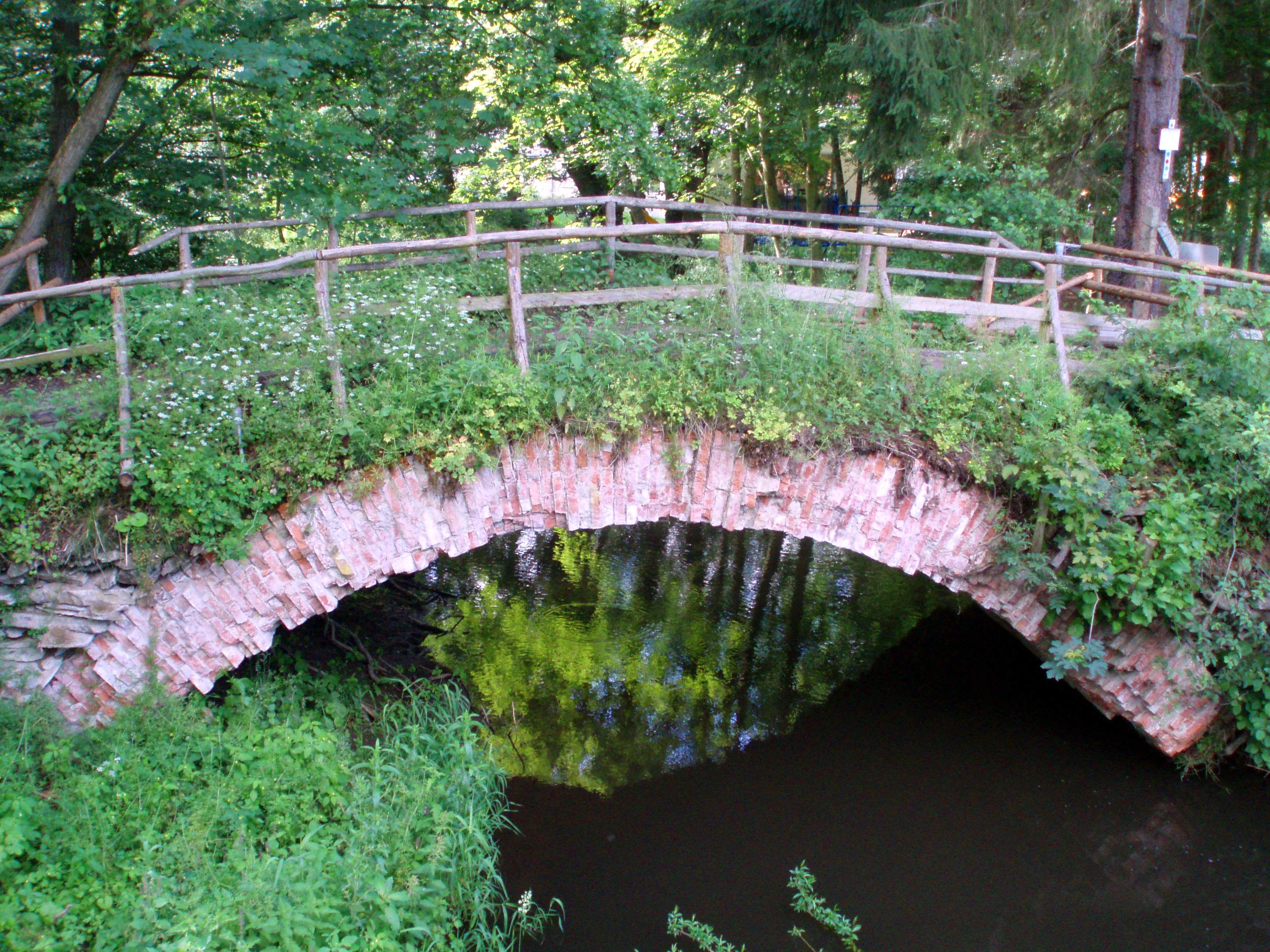
- Old bridge over the Selke near the Selke Mill

Location
- Country: Germany
- State: Saxony-Anhalt

Physical characteristics
- Source
  - location: west of Friedrichshöhe
  - coordinates: 51°38′13″N 10°54′19″E
  - elevation: 520 m above sea level (NN)
- Mouth
  - location: near Rodersdorf into the Bode
  - coordinates: 51°52′23″N 11°13′45″E
  - elevation: 118 m above sea level (NN)
- Length: 64.4 km (40.0 mi)
- Basin size: 468 km^{2} (181 sq mi)

Basin features
- Progression: Bode→ Saale→ Elbe→ North Sea

The Selke (German pronunciation: [ˈzɛlkə]) is a river of Saxony-Anhalt, Germany.

It is a right-hand tributary of the Bode that starts in the Harz Mountains before breaking out onto the northeastern Harz Foreland. It has a length of 64 kilometres (40 mi), of which 30 kilometres (19 mi) lie in the forested mountains of the Harz and the rest on the agricultural lowlands of the Harz Foreland.

== Course ==
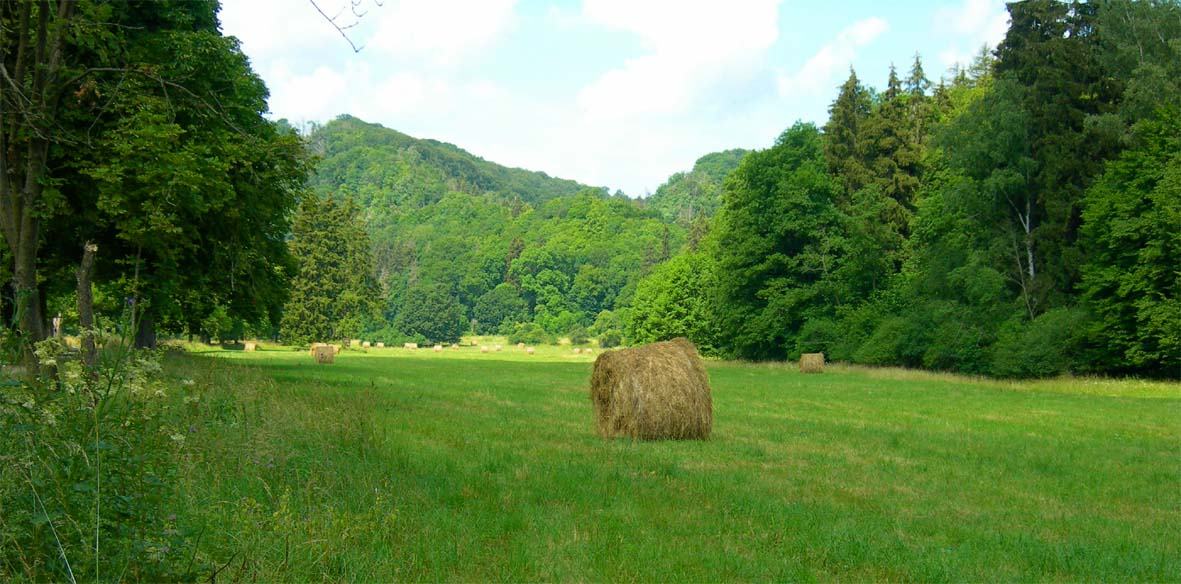
The Selke Valley near Meisdorf. A retention basin is planned here.

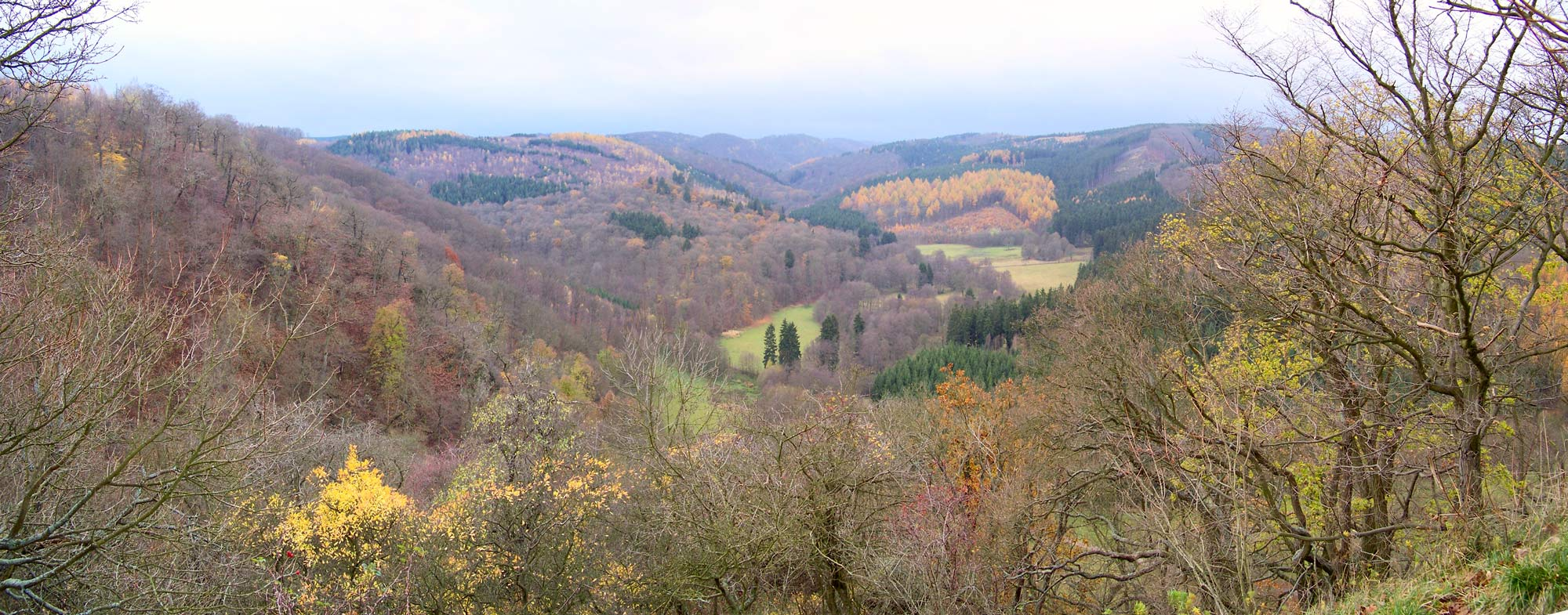
View of the Selke Valley from Old Falkenstein Castle

The Selke rises near the village of Friedrichshöhe in the borough of Güntersberge at a height of about 520 metres (1,710 ft) above NN. From Friedrichshöhe to Mägdesprung in the borough of Harzgerode, it is accompanied by the Selke Valley Railway for a distance of 17 kilometres (11 mi). The Selke has cut deeply into the Harz Mountains in some places whilst in others it runs in a broad valley, depending on the bedrock. In Meisdorf on the northeastern edge of the Lower Harz, the Selke leaves the forested mountain region and winds across a cultivated plain, continuing to flow in an easterly or northeasterly direction as far as Ermsleben. Beyond Ermsleben the river swings through 90° to the northwest and runs from here in an almost straight line to its mouth on the Bode near Rodersdorf, a village in the borough of Wegeleben. The Selke empties into the Bode at an elevation of 118 metres (387 ft).

In the past Selke burst its banks on several occasions causing significant damage. This led to plans by the state government for the expansion of existing floodwater retention basins and the creation of a new one. Particularly controversial is a medium-term 3.7-to-5.5-metre (12 to 18 ft) high embankment for the Selke Valley at Meisdorf. The citizens' initiative "Save the Selke Valley in the East Harz" is fighting this plan because they argue that it will destroy a scenically beautiful section of the Selke Valley that is important for nature conservation.

== Castles ==
High above the Selke Valley is a striking and largely preserved medieval castle, Falkenstein, which is open to the public. On the other side of the valley, on a prominent spur, is a lofty viewing point, the Selkesicht, 330 metres (1,080 ft) above sea level, and at the site of another castle, the Ackeburg, with good views of Falkenstein Castle and the Selke valley. Both locations are checkpoints in the Harzer Wandernadel hiking network.

== Tributaries ==
- Katzsohlbach (right)
- Limbach (left)
- Steinfurtbach (left)
- Westerbach (right)
- Rödelbach (right)
- Hüttenstollen
- Glasebach (right)
- Uhlenbach (left)
- Teufelsgrundbach
- Pulverbach (right)
- Schwefelbach (left)
- Friedenstalbach (left)
- Krebsbach (left)
- Schiebecksbach (right)
- Nagelbach (left)
- Titanbach (right)
- Sauerbach (left)
- Getel (left)
- Hauptseegraben (right)
- Grenzgraben (left)

== See also ==
- Selke Valley Railway
- Selke Valley Trail
- List of rivers of Saxony-Anhalt
