= Egeno II of Konradsburg =

11th-century Konradsburg free knight

Egeno II of Konradsburg (also spelled Conradsburg) was a free knight of Konradsburg, in the northeast of the Harz region in Central Germany, near Ermsleben.

Egeno II may have been the son or grandson of Egeno I of Konradsburg. Around 1080 (after 1076, before 1083) Egeno II killed Count Adalbert II of Ballenstedt from the House of Ascania at Westdorf near Aschersleben. Adalbert was the advocate of Nienburg and Hagenrode and had been imprisoned from 1075 to 1077. The reasons for the murder are not particularly clear. There may have been political motives or Egeno may have acquired Ascanian estates during Adalbert's time in captivity and the two parties ended up feuding. Egeno was made to give up his family seat of Konradsburg to atone for the murder and the castle was turned into a Benedictine or Augustinian monastery. According to legend, the stone cross of Westdorf recalls the crime.

From 1115, the lords of Konradsburg destroyed the Old Falkenstein Castle and built the new Falkenstein Castle, where the Saxon Law or Sachsenspiegel was probably written a hundred years later on behalf of Count Hoyer of Falkenstein (de). In 1142, the lords of Konradsburg are referred to for the last time as "von Konradsburg", thereafter they were "von Falkenstein".
