= Hermann II, Count Palatine of Lotharingia =

Count Palatine of Lotharingia from 1064 to 1085

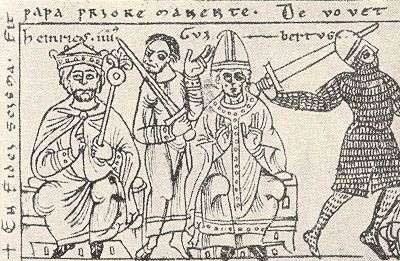
The imperial crowning of Henry IV, Holy Roman Emperor (left) but “beiniço·itu (thread/ line of descendence) according to script (“s” seems to have been added later) by Antipope Clement III (middle-right). Between them stands the Imperial Swordbearer, Count Palatine Hermann II of Lotharingia. Picture in the chronicle of Otto of Freising, Codex Jenensis Bose q.6 (1157).

Hermann II (born 1049; died Echternach, 20 September 1085), Count Palatine of Lotharingia 1064–1085. He was count in the Ruhrgau and the Zulpichgau, as well as a count of Brabant.

== Life ==
According to Egon Kimpen he was the son of Henry I of Lotharingia († 1061) and Mathild of Verdun († 1060), daughter of Gozelo I of Lotharingia, but the basis for this has been questioned. However, if that is the case, his maternal uncle was Pope Stephen IX. Until 1064, young Hermann was under the guardianship of Anno II, Archbishop of Cologne, who significantly reduced Hermann's territorial power.

In 1080 he married Adelaide of Weimar-Orlamünde († 1100), widow of Adalbert II, Count of Ballenstedt. She was a daughter of Otto of Orlamünde, count of Weimar and margrave of Meissen in Thuringia, and Adela of Brabant. Together they had two children who had died by 1085.

He is assumed to have been the last Count Palatine of Lotharingia of the Ezzonian dynasty. He was seriously injured in a duel with Albert III, Count of Namur, near his castle in Dalhem. He died in the abbey of Echternach on September 20, 1085.

His widow married again, her third husband being Henry of Laach, count in the Mayfeldgau, who became the first count palatine of the Rhine between 1085 and 1087.

== Sources ==
- Jackman, Donald C. (2012). The Kleeberg Fragment of the Gleiberg County. Editions Enplage.

Preceded by Henry I	Count Palatine of Lotharingia; 1064–1085	Vacant Office suspended
