= Henry of Laach =

11th-century German nobleman

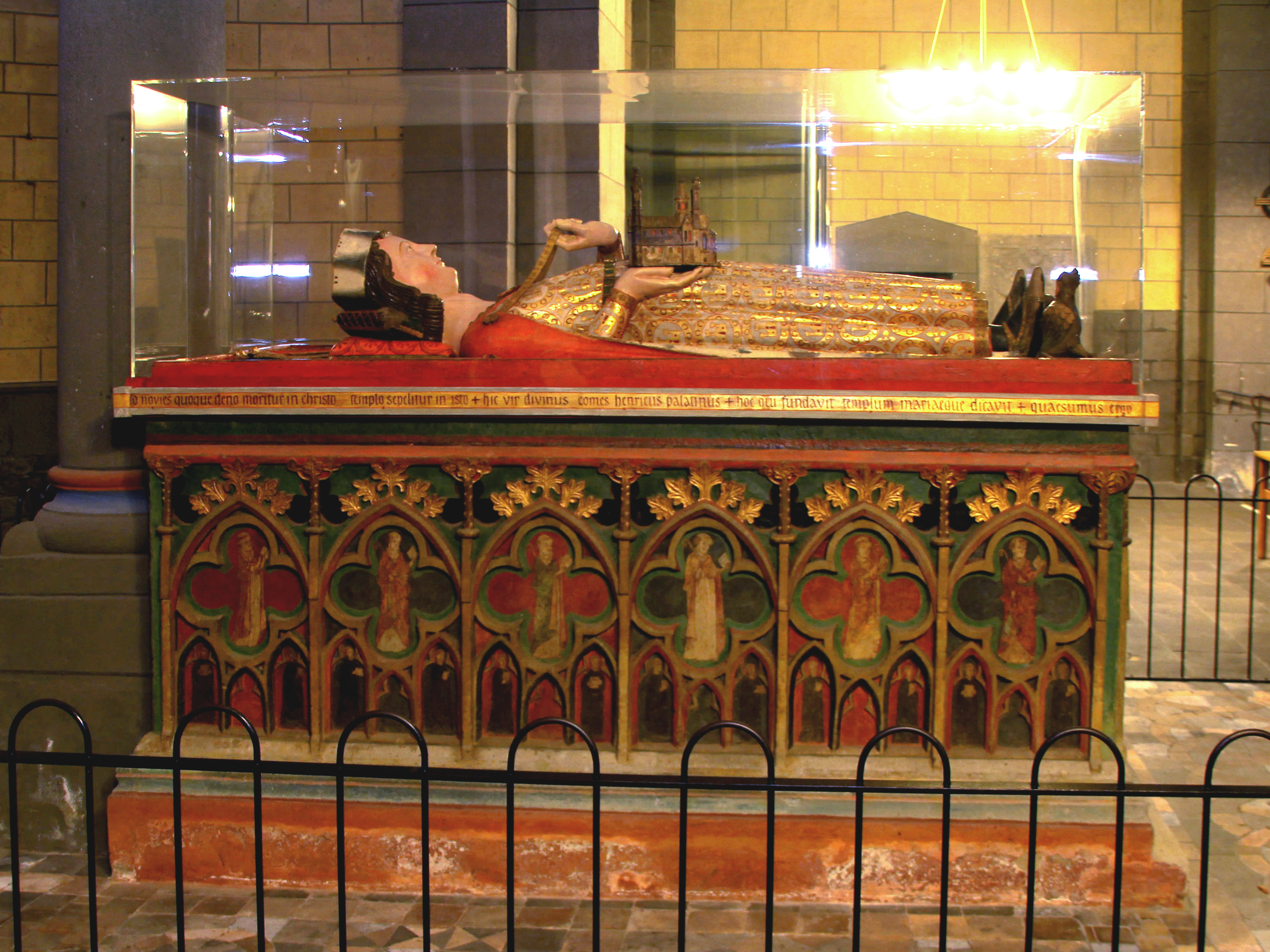
Tomb of Henry of Laach at Maria Laach Abbey

Henry of Laach (in German: Heinrich von Laach) was the first count palatine of the Rhine (1085/1087–1095), then within the area of Lower Lotharingia. Henry was the son of Herman I, count of Gleiberg. Henry was a follower of Henry IV, Holy Roman Emperor. He had lands in the southeastern Eifel and on the Moselle River.

Most of the holdings of Hermann II, Count Palatine fell back to the emperor, when Hermann died without successor. The emperor named Henry count palatine of the Rhine and during the emperor's trip to Italy tasked Henry to hold interim judicial councils. Henry married Herman's widow, Adelaide of Weimar-Orlamünde (d. 1100). From this marriage, Henry may have taken control over some of her holdings along the Moselle. As a consequence, the geographic center of the palatinate moved towards the south.

With his wife, Adelaide, Henry founded the Maria Laach Abbey. He was succeeded by his stepson, Siegfried of Ballenstedt.

== Sources ==
- Arnold, Benjamin (1991). Princes and Territories in Medieval Germany. Cambridge University Press.
- Jackman, Donald C. (2012). The Kleeberg Fragment of the Gleiberg County. Editions Enlaplage.
- Bixton, Paul B. (2001). "Rhenish Palatinate". In Jeep, John M. (ed.). Medieval Germany: An Encyclopedia. Routledge.

Preceded by Hermann II as count palatine of Lotharingia	Count Palatine of the Rhine new creation 1085/1087–1095	Succeeded by Siegfried of Ballenstedt
