= Adalbert II of Ballenstedt =

11th-century Saxon count

- Coat of arms of the Counts of Ballenstedt
- Born: c. 1030; Ballenstedt Castle, Saxony
- Died: between 1076 and 1083; Westdorf near Aschersleben, Saxony
- Noble family: House of Ascania
- Spouse: Adelaide of Weimar-Orlamünde
- Issue: Otto of Ballenstedt; Siegfried of Ballenstedt
- Father: Esico of Ballenstedt
- Mother: Matilda of Swabia

Adalbert II of Ballenstedt (c. 1030 – 1076/1083), an early member of the House of Ascania, was Graf (count) in Saxony and Vogt of Nienburg Abbey.

== Life ==
Adelbert, first mentioned in a 1033 deed, was born at Ballenstedt Castle in the Saxon Schwabengau, the son of Count Esico of Ballenstedt (d. about 1060) and his wife Matilda, probably a daughter of Duke Herman II of Swabia. About 1068 he married Adelaide of Weimar-Orlamünde, a daughter of Margrave Otto I of Meissen and his wife, Adela of Louvain. Their two sons were:

- Otto the Rich (c. 1070 – 1123), Count of Ballenstedt
- Siegfried (c. 1075 – 1113), Count of Weimar-Orlamünde, Count Palatine of the Rhine from 1095/97.

Adalbert was the heir to extended possessions and rose to one of the leading Saxon nobles. In 1069 he was appointed count in Nordthüringgau, later also in the Saxon Eastern March. According to the chronicler Lambert of Hersfeld, Adalbert supported Margrave Dedi I in his 1069 conflict with King Henry IV. Dedi, a member of the House of Wettin, had married Adalbert's mother-in-law Adela of Louvain, widow since 1067, and claimed the Thuringian possessions of her deceased husband Margrave Otto of Meissen. Their revolt found little support; both had to surrender in short order and were pardoned in 1070. Adalbert, however, remained a fierce opponent of the king.

From 1072 on he participated in the Saxon Rebellion led by Count Otto of Nordheim and Bishop Burchard II of Halberstadt, for which he was arrested after King Henry's victory in the 1075 Battle of Langensalza. Even after his release about two years later, he backed the German anti-king Rudolf of Rheinfelden until he was finally killed, possibly in a feud, at Westdorf near Aschersleben by the Saxon noble Egeno II of Konradsburg.

Adalbert's widow Adelaide married Count Palatine Hermann II of Lotharingia from the Ezzonid dynasty and—in her third marriage—Count Palatine Henry of Laach from the House of Luxembourg, father of her son Siegfried.

== Sources ==
- Eldevik, John (2012). Episcopal Power and Ecclesiastical Reform in the German Empire. Cambridge University Press.
- Jackman, Donald C. (2012). The Kleeberg Fragment of the Gleiberg County. Editions Enlaplage.
- Reuter, Timothy (2010). Nelson, Janet L. (ed.). Medieval Polities and Modern Mentalities. Cambridge University Press.
- Loud, Graham A.; Schenk, Jochen, eds. (2017). The Origins of the German Principalities, 1100-1350: Essays by German Historians. Routledge.
