= List of ponds of the Lower Harz Pond and Ditch System =

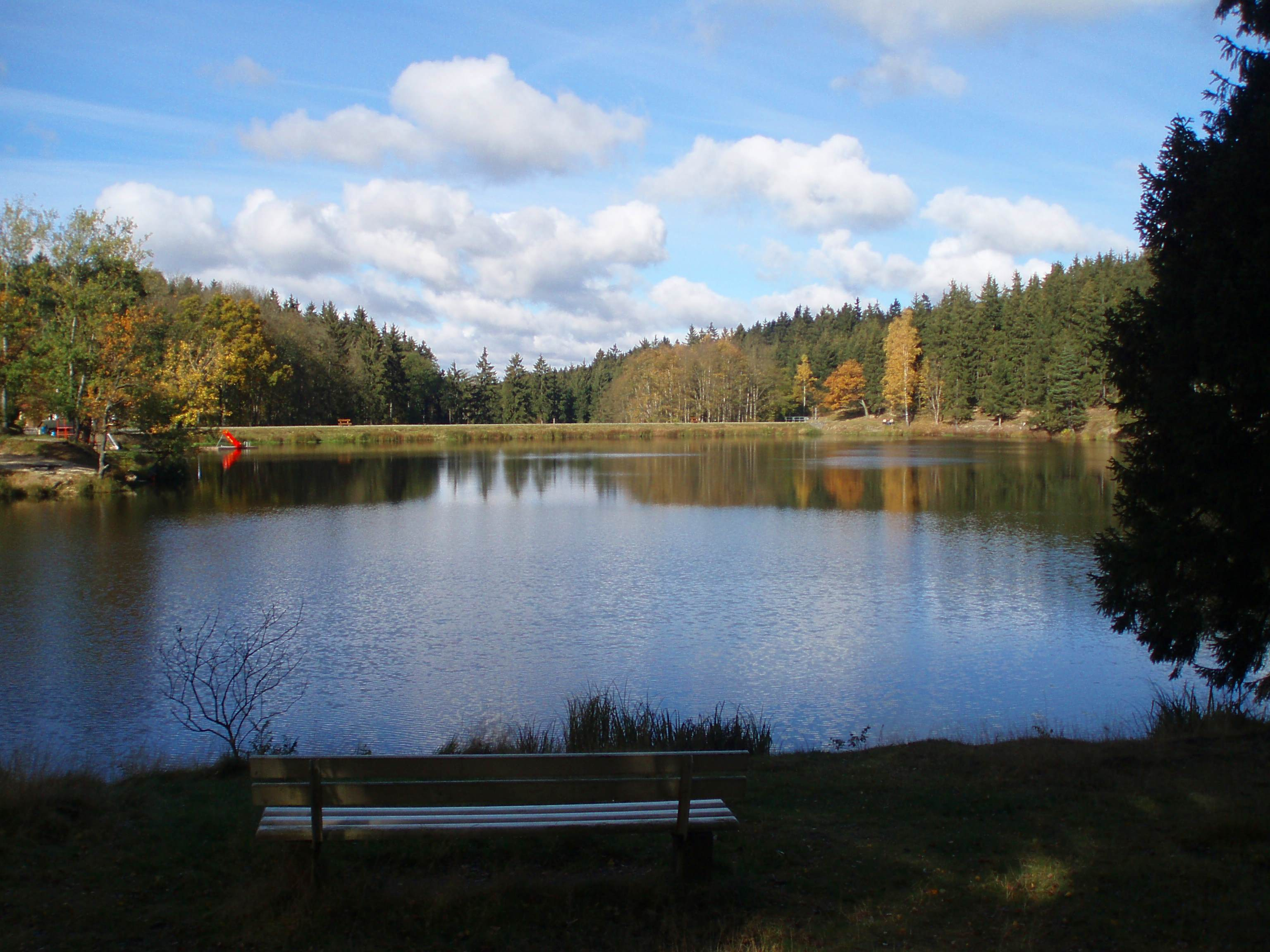
Birnbaumteich

The ponds of the Lower Harz Pond and Ditch System in Germany consist of around 20 small and larger reservoirs. Most were laid out roughly from the beginning of the 17th century between the Upper Lude, Großer Auerberg, Straßberg, Neudorf and Silberhütte. Several of the pond barrages are classified as dams. The dam of the Gräfiggründer Teich is also the second oldest reservoir in Germany.

The ponds are located in the mining fields of Straßberg, Silberhütte, Birnbaum and Neudorf.

== Table of ponds ==
Name	Laid as	Built	Dam length	Mining field	Present usage
Gräfiggründer Teich	unknown	1310 before 1320	100	Straßberg	bathing pool
Möllerteich	Kunstteich	1745	ca. 80	Straßberg	hunting (privately owned)
Kiliansteich, upper	Kunstteich	1610	110	Straßberg	drinking water (forebay)
Kiliansteich, middle	Kunstteich	1703		Straßberg	flooded
Kiliansteich, III	Kunstteich	1703	210	Straßberg	drinking water
Kiliansteich, lower	Kunstteich	1703		Straßberg	flooded
Frankenteich	Kunstteich	1724	150	Straßberg	drinking water
Maliniusteich	Kunstteich & Hüttenteich	1706–1707	80	Straßberg	drinking water ?
Die drei Treuen Nachbarn (unknown)	Kunstteich	c. 1704		Straßberg	none (silted up)
Die drei Treuen Nachbarn (Fauler Pfützenteich)	Kunstteich	1704	240	Straßberg	fish breeding
Die drei Treuen Nachbarn (Treuer Nachbarteich)	Kunstteich	1703–1704	140	Straßberg	bathing pool, water management
Glasebacher Teich	Kunstteich	1716		Straßberg	none (dam broken)
Kalbsaugenteich (Kalbesauger Teich?)	Kunstteich	1779		Birnbaum	none (empty)
Birnbaumteich	Hüttenteich	1699	144	Birnbaum	bathing pool
Teufelsteich	Kunstteich	1696–97	211	Silberhütte	drinking water
Fürstenteich	Hüttenteich	1729	110	Silberhütte	water management
Silberhütter Pochwerksteich	Hüttenteich	1779 before 1779		Neudorf	none (filled in)
Silberhütter sewage farm	sewage farm	1890		Neudorf	none (filled in)
Grenzteich	fishpond	before 1721		Neudorf	fishpond
Neudorfer Gemeindeteich	fishpond	before 1777		Neudorf	firefighting reservoir
Heller Wasserkunst (Neudorfer 1. kleiner Teich)	Kunstteich	1860		Neudorf	none (heavily silted up)
Neudorfer 2. kleiner Teich	Kunstteich	before 1811		Neudorf	none (empty)
Neudorfer Kunstteich	Kunstteich	1764	145	Neudorf	sewage farm
unknown	Kunstteich	1764	145	Neudorf	1st pre-dam Neudorfer Kunstteich
unknown	Kunstteich	1764	145	Neudorf	2nd pre-dam Neudorfer Kunstteich
unknown (am Büschengraben)			ca. 40	Straßberg	unknown

== Sources ==
- Wilfried Strenz, Historisch-geographische Forschungen in der DDR
- Robert Wouters (Hrsg. Damnbetrieb Sachsen-Anhalt), Damn in Sachsen-Anhalt, ISBN 978-3-89812-677-9
- Wilfried Ließmann: Historischer Bergbau im Harz, ISBN 978-3-540-31328-1
