= Siebengründer Graben =

The Siebengründer Graben is a mining ditch, constructed in 1903/1904 in the Lower Harz in central Germany, that is dry and no longer used.

== History ==
An earlier ditch, the Kochsgraben was completed in 1724. In the course of the decline of mining in the Straßberg area of the Harz Mountains the ditch was initially extended by the section known as the Anhaltischer or Langer Graben in the Neudorf Mining Field. After mining ceased there in 1903, the section to Neudorf was closed and the Kochsgraben extended for a final time.

This new section, called the Siebengründer Graben, linked the Siebengrund bottom, the catchment area of the Teufelsteich reservoir, was linked to the Lower Harz Pond and Ditch System. In addition to the Teufelsteich, the ponds of Fürstenteich and Silberhütter Pochwerksteich were also now supplied with water from the Lude stream and the Rödelbachgraben. The entire ditch was renamed as the Silberhütter Kunstgraben, although it was no longer a true Kunstgraben because its water was no longer used to power any mining facilities.

When the silverworks in Silberhütte went bankrupt in 1937, the ditch was used to generate electricity until 1939 when it was drained.

== Sources ==
- Das Unterharzer Teich- und Grabensystem
- Wilfried Ließmann: Historischer Bergbau im Harz. 3. Auflage. Springer, Berlin 1997, ISBN 978-3-540-31327-4
