= Glasebach =

Glasebach may refer to the following places or geographical features in Germany:

- Glasebach (Selke), a tributary of the Selke in the Lower Harz, Saxony-Anhalt
- Glasebach (Bauerngraben), a tributary of the Bauerngraben in the district of Mansfeld-Südharz in the Lower Harz, Saxony-Anhalt
- Glasebacher Teich, an old impounded pond in the Lower Harz, Saxony-Anhalt
- Glasebach Pit, a mining museum in the Lower Harz, Saxony-Anhalt
