= Frankenteich =

- Interactive map of Frankenteich
- Location: Harz district, Harz Mountains, Germany
- Coordinates: 51.59944°N 11.02333°E
- Construction began: 1724, overhauled in 1970-1973

Dam and spillways
- Impounds: Stollgraben, 2 unknown tributaries
- Height (foundation): 17 m (56 ft)
- Height (thalweg): 16 m (52 ft)
- Length: 150 m (490 ft)
- Elevation at crest: 434.5 m (1,426 ft)
- Width (crest): 4 m (13 ft)
- Dam volume: 42,000 m^{3} (1,500,000 cu ft)

Reservoir
- Total capacity: 0.51×10^{6} m^{3} (18×10^{6} cu ft)
- Active capacity: 0.46×10^{6} m^{3} (16×10^{6} cu ft)
- Catchment area: 3.7 km^{2} (1.4 sq mi)
- Surface area: 11 ha (27 acres)
- Normal elevation: 430.60 m (1,412.7 ft)

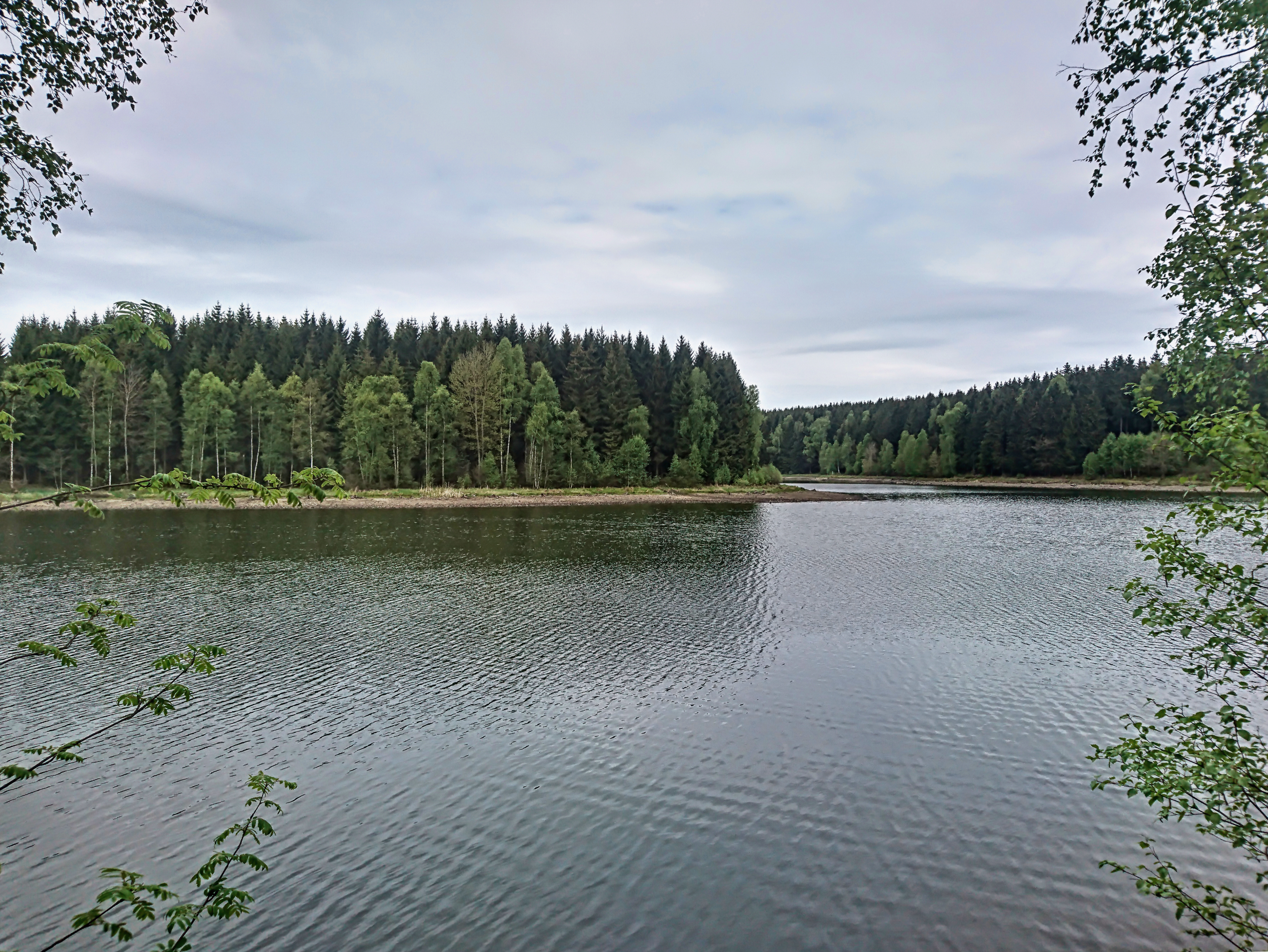
Frankenteich reservoir

The Frankenteich (also called the Sägemüllerteich) is an old reservoir in the Harz Mountains of central Germany. It was constructed in 1716 under the direction of mining director (Bergwerksdirektor), Christian Zacharias Koch, for the mining industry and is the largest pond in the Lower Harz. Since 1901 it has supplied drinking water to the village of Straßberg. It impounds the Rödelbachgraben, which discharges into the Selke in Straßberg. A mining ditch runs past the foot of the dam from the Kiliansteich which, like the Frankenteich, belongs to the heritage area designated as the Lower Harz Pond and Ditch System.

The dam, which is made of argillaceous and quartzitic shale, is sealed with an internal core of grass sods. The earth dam was overhauled in 1973, but not raised. During the overhaul, a section was cut in the bottom outlet in the centre of the embankment and then replaced with a new seal of clay and silt and new pipework.

== See also ==
- List of reservoirs in Germany
- List of ponds in the Lower Harz Pond and Ditch System

== Sources ==
- Talsperren in Sachsen-Anhalt, Autorenkollegium, Hrsg.: Talsperrenmeisterei des Landes Sachsen-Anhalt, 1994
