= Hüttenstollen =

Coordinates: 51°37′07″N 11°03′06″E

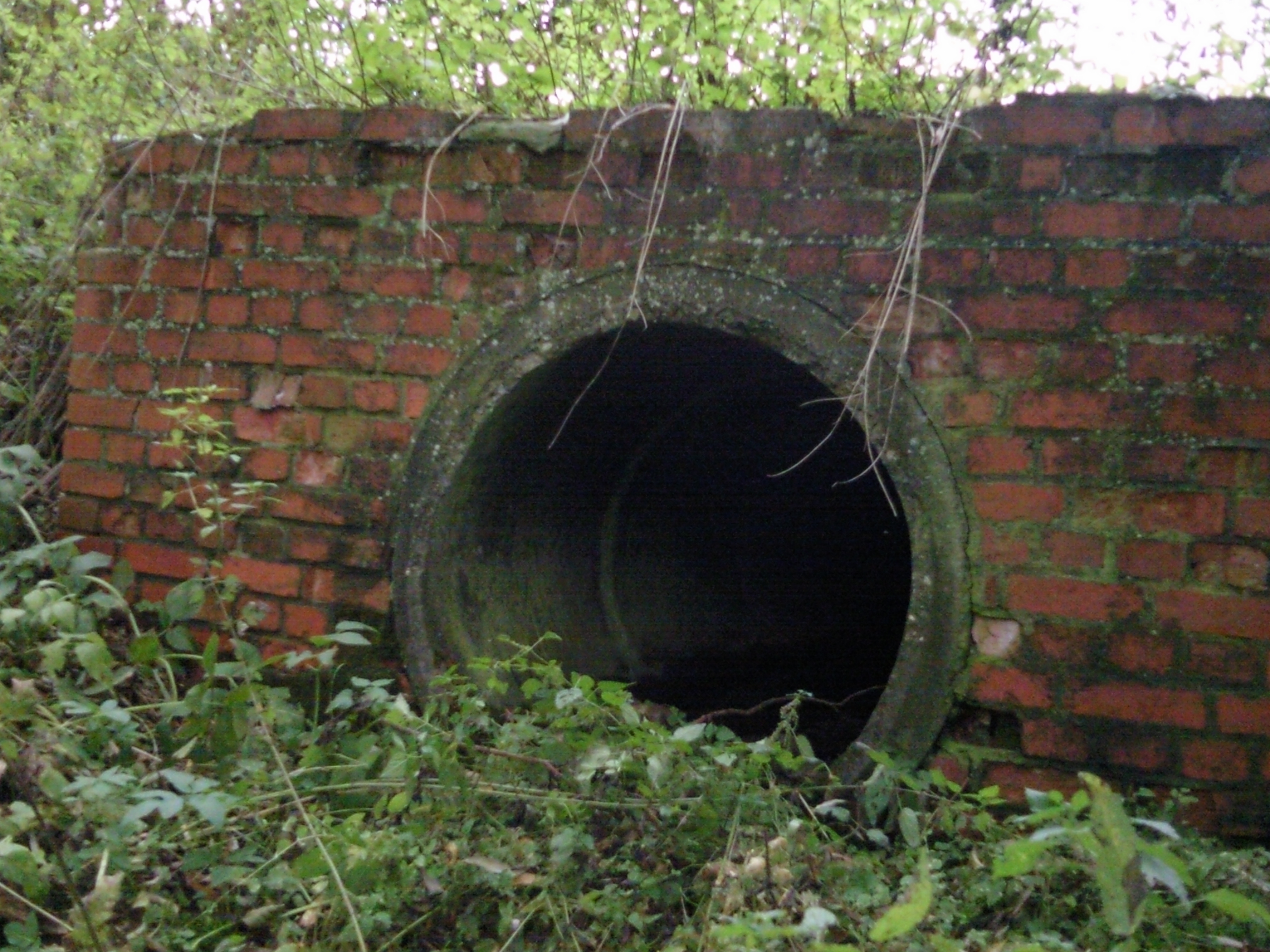
- The entrance to the Hüttenstollen

- Location within Germany
- Location: Straßberg, ,
- Opened: before 1696
- Closed: 1876

The Hüttenstollen, also Straßberger Hüttenstollen, was the central drainage adit (tunnel) in the Straßberg mining field and was also part of the Lower Harz Pond and Ditch System in the Harz Mountains of Germany. The adit lies at a depth of 50 m (160 ft) and is 750 m (2,460 ft) long. The pit water was drained into the Selke. The drainage ditches were the Straßberger Flösse and the Stollgraben.

== History ==
The construction of a deep adit had begun before 1696. The aim was to provide ventilation for the pits at Straßberg: the Segen Gottes, Hilfe Gottes, Gott hilft gewiß and Vertrau auf Gott (later, the Glasebach Pit). Georg Christoph von Utterodt, who came from Ilmenau, took over the running of the Straßberg mines in 1701. In the years that followed the adit was driven out from the Selke valley.

Under Christian Zacharias Koch the adit, which had since been named the Hüttenstollen was further extended in 1720. By linking it to the main adit (Hauptstollen) south of Straßberg, the Hüttenstollen was expanded to become the central drainage adit for the Straßberg pits of Getreuer Bergmann (formerly Gott hilft gewiß), Glückauf (formerly Hilfe Gottes) and Zum Schwarzen Hirsch. The pits are holed through to one another.

A final extension was carried out from 1848-1856 to the Kreuz Pit. In 1876 the adit was abandoned.

== Richtschacht ==
The Straßberg mines were bought in 1856 by the Straßberg-Haynsche company. The Richtschacht was started up in 1858 as a 180 m-long (590 ft) mineshaft with an underground wheelhouse (Radstube) and was linked to the Hüttenstollen. From its foot, at a depth of 80 m (260 ft), it was intended to handle the water management and surveying of deeper-lying ores up to a depth of 210 m (690 ft). The driving water for the unexpectedly large quantities of water from old workings was insufficient; in addition only quartz, calcite and narrow veins with small amounts of galena were found. Mining ceased after the workings were flooded.

== Present condition ==
The adit lost its function when the Straßberg pits closed and has collapsed in places. The Richtschacht was verbühnt and collapsed (verstürzt); neither winch (Hornstatt) nor wheelhouse (Radstube) has survived.

The walled mouth of the Hüttenstollen on the Selke is still visible and, like the site of the Richtschacht, is marked with a mining information board.

== Sources ==
- Wilfried Ließmann: Historischer Bergbau im Harz. 3. Auflage, Springer, Berlin 1997, ISBN 978-3-540-31327-4
- Das Unterharzer Teich- und Grabensystem
- Straßberg / Harz - Bergbautannen - Strassberg
- Karl-Heinz Krause, Entwicklung und gegenwärtige Funktion von Anlagen der historischen bergbaulichen Wasserwirtschaft im Unterharz; in: Wilfried Strenz - Arbeitskreis Historische Geographie der Geographischen Gesellschaft der DDR, Historisch-geographische Forschungen in der DDR Auszug

== See also ==
- List of mines in the Harz
