= Lower Harz Pond and Ditch System =

Hydraulic structure in Harz, Germany

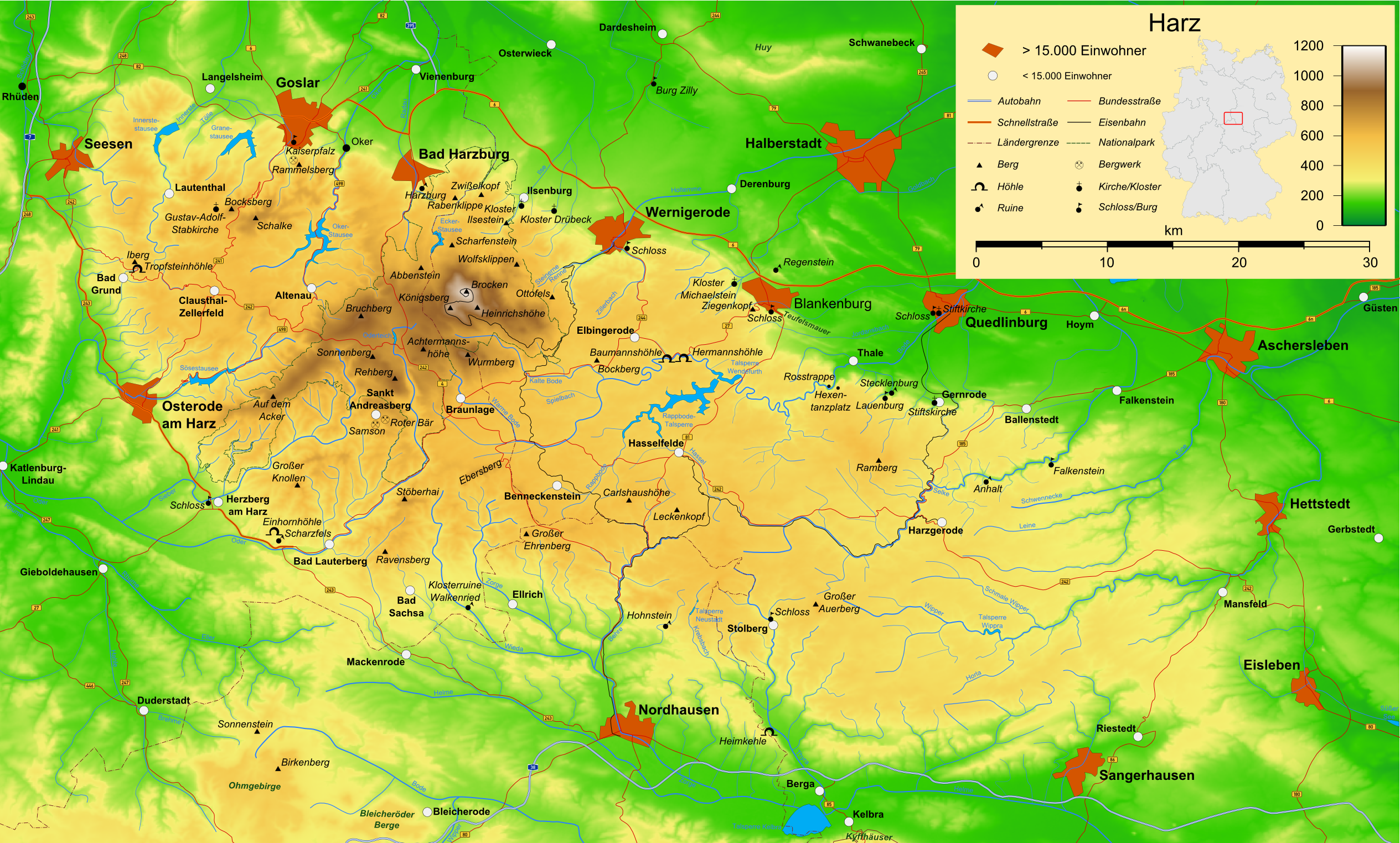
Topography of the Harz Mountains. The dividing line between the Upper and Lower Harz runs roughly along a line from Ilsenburg to Bad Lauterberg, the Lower Harz (Unterharz) being the eastern, less high, region.

Within the Lower Harz region (in the counties of Harz and Mansfeld-Südharz in central Germany) are still many traces of the historical water management facilities used by the mining industry. In addition to water-carrying ditches and ponds, there are also long-abandoned ditches and dry pond beds. The Lower Harz Pond and Ditch System (German: Unterharzer Teich- und Grabensystem), which forms the major part of these old water management facilities, lies in the central Lower Harz, almost entirely within the borough of the present-day town of Harzgerode.

== Extent ==
In the central Lower Harz between the villages of Neudorf, Silberhütte, Straßberg, Großem Auerberg and the upper Lude river is the only, historical, mine water management system in the Lower Harz. Sheltered by the geographical-climatic conditions of the Lower Harz, the system never reached the scale of comparable systems in the Upper Harz and the Ore Mountains. The river catchment areas affected are primarily the source regions and upper reaches of small mountain streams. Parts of the water management system can be dated back as far as 1320. This network of ditches (Kunstgraben), trenches (Rösche) and ponds (Kunstteiche) has been called the Lower Harz Pond and Ditch System.

There are about 300 ponds in the Lower Harz as a whole. Of these, 36 were mining ponds that had a combined retention capacity of 2.6 million m³. The ponds of the Lower Harz Pond and Ditch System thus held about 40% of the capacity of all Lower Harz ponds. This amounts to some 26 ponds, most of which are covered today. They currently serve mainly as drinking water reservoirs.

All elements of the mine water management system, regardless of condition, were placed under conservation orders in 1991 as a heritage area (Flächendenkmal). In doing so, the name of "Lower Harz Pond and Ditch System", which was already in use no later than 1986 for the system of the central Lower Harz, was broadened by the Saxony-Anhalt Department of Heritage Conservation and Archaeology (Landesamt für Denkmalpflege und Archäologie Sachsen-Anhalt) to cover the whole of the Harz Mountains lying in Anhalt, although this step was not followed by the literature that appeared later.

== History ==
=== Prehistory ===
There has been mining in the Straßberg Field since at least 1438, and possibly even as early as 1279. The first silver smelting works are recorded in the period from 1511-1566. The first water management facilities in the Rödelbach valley also date to this time. By the second half of the 16th century the ore deposits near the surface were exhausted and mining largely ground to a standstill. During the Thirty Years' War mining operations ceased completely.

At that time, water management in the Straßberg Field was still at the stage it was in 1610. In addition to the Rödelbachgraben, there was the Dorfrösche channel between the Rödelbachgraben and Flösse. There were also two ponds, the Gräfiggründer Teich and the Lower Kilian Pond (Unterer Kiliansteich).

=== 1693–1755 ===
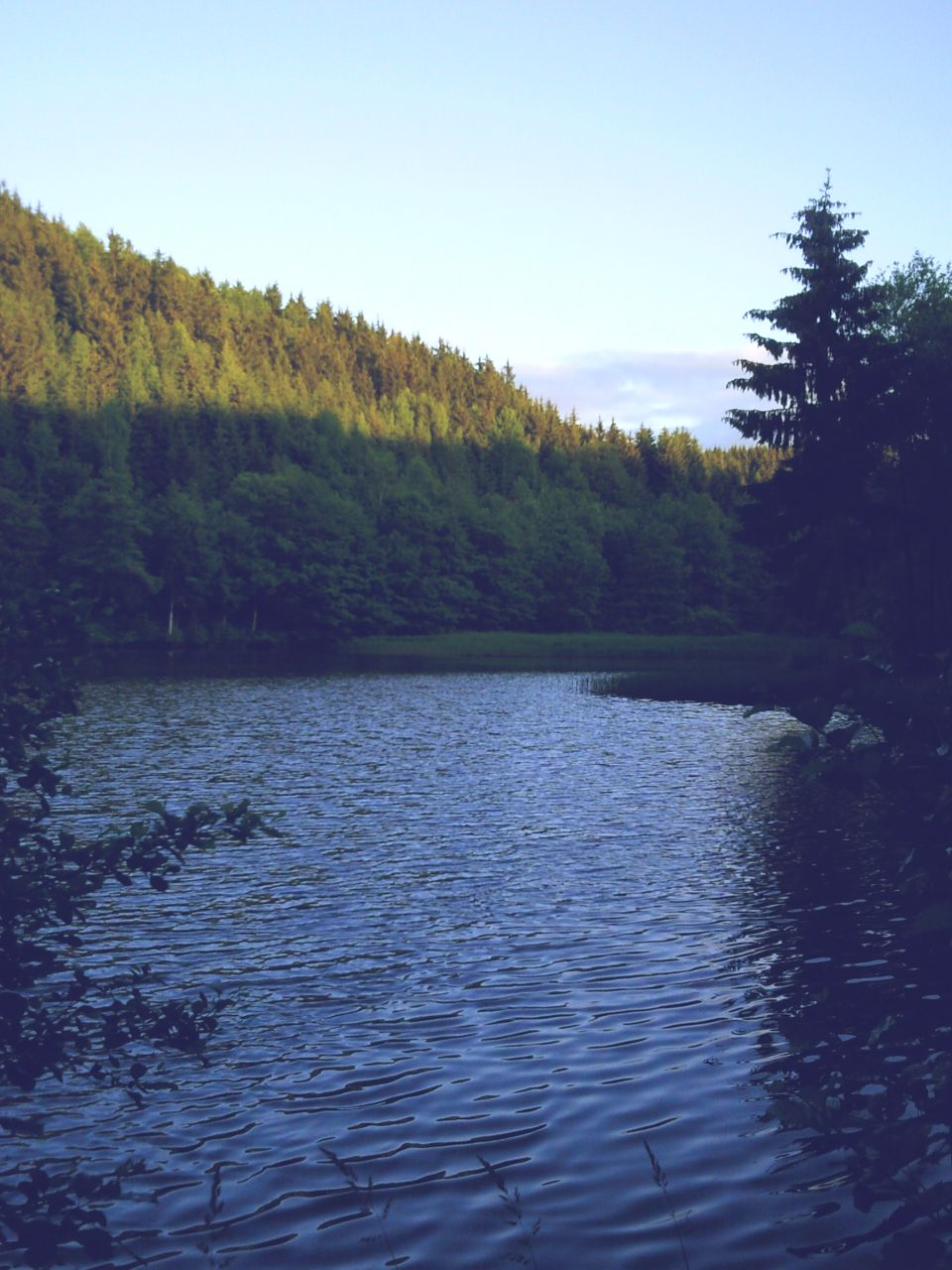
The Maliniusteich built in 1704 by Chief Mining Officer (Berghauptmann) von Utterodt

In 1663, new mining companies (Gewerkschaften) were formed and claims for several pits were staked. However, it was seven more years before silver mining began again.

In 1701, Georg Christoff von Utterodt, who came from Ilmenau, took over the post of Chief Mining Officer (Berghauptmann) for Straßberg. He united all the pits into a single company or Großgewerkschaft with 1,024 mining shares (Kuxen). The following main pits now came under Utterodt's leadership: Segen Gottes, Hilfe Gottes, Gott hilft gewiß, Vertrau auf Gott (later renamed as Grube Glasebach), as well as the neighbouring lodes and the pits of Hayn and Schwenda. In addition there were man-riding, water wheel and hoisting shafts. In 1703-1704, Utterodt had the Schindelbrüch Ditch laid between the ponds of Gräfingründer Teich and the Fauler Pfützenteich. By 1707, six mining ponds had been added with a total retention capacity of about 380,000 m³, as well as two more mining ditches. The Schindelbrüch Ditch (Schindelbrücher Kunstgraben) was able to supply all the Straßberg ponds with water and is the oldest Kunstgraben in the Lower Harz Pond and Ditch System. In addition he had the Hüttenstollen built, a deep gallery, from the Selke valley, to drain the pit water from the pits of Getreuer Bergmann, Gott hilft gewiß, Glückauf and Zum Schwarzen Hirsch. Under Utterodt's leadership, the Straßberg Field became the most important mining area in the Harz from 1704. The financial difficulties of the company that arose after 1707 were resolved in 1708 on the Straßberger Gewerkentag ("Straßberg Trade Day") under the leadership of Johann Jeremias Gründler (1681–1753) and Dr. Jakob Waitz. Utterodt finished working in Straßberg in 1709.

In 1712, Christian Zacharias Koch assumed the post of mining director (Bergwerksdirektor) in Straßberg. He continued the work of Georg Christoff von Utterodt and developed mining and water management further, along the lines of the Upper Harz mines. Under his direction the two largest ponds in the Lower Harz were laid out which, together, held about 800,000 m³: Glasebacher Teich (1716) and Frankenteich (1724). He had the Schindelbrücher Kunstgraben extended in the catchment areas of the rivers Lude and Thyra. Due to resistance by the Stolberg villagers this was initially built without comital authority and, from 1726 to 1736, completed as far as the Ludenrösche (link section to the Schindelbrücher Kunstgraben). The trench was first used in 1745 and completed the Lower Harz Pond and Ditch System. He finished working in 1755, coinciding with the end of the most important operating period for silver mining in Straßberg.

=== 1756 - 1910 ===
This period saw the decline of mining in the Straßberg region and the associated extension of the Kochsgraben in the area of Neudorf, in order to supply the mines there with driving water. Mining ended in 1903. The section of ditch to Neudorf was closed and hence a new section was built in the Teufelsgrund. This was called the Siebengründer Graben.

=== 1911 - 1939 ===
The driving water ditch from the Teufelsteich was used until 1939 for the generation of electricity in Silberhütte. That spelled the end of the Lower Harz Pond and Ditch System after more than 300 years of operation.

=== Present condition ===
The Lower Harz Pond and Ditch System was placed under conservation status in 1991 as a heritage area. Several ponds and ditches along the mining education trail were signed.

At the same time considerable areas were destroyed as a result of ignorance by the authorities and the drastic action of the privatised forestry industry in Saxony-Anhalt. As a result walking even along the main ditches is difficult and most ponds are gradually deteriorating.

According to the Saxony-Anhalt water law all reservoirs with more than 100,000 m³ of retention capacity and more than 5 metre high barrages are classified as dams and have to be officially monitored in particular ways (by the Talsperrenbetrieb Saxony-Anhalt). These include seven of the still covered ponds, that are monitored, some of which were renovated and are in relatively good condition. They serve, in part, as drinking water reservoirs. The Talsperrenbetrieb Sachsen-Anhalt, according to their own statement, manages "with much effort and a high level of commitment, these impressive monuments to hydraulic architecture that are a fitting testimony to the ingenuity and skill of former hydraulic engineers in the Lower Harz".

== Ponds ==
Essentially there is a total of 26 impounded ponds in the mining areas of Straßberg, Silberhütte and Neudorf.

== See also ==
- List of ponds in the Lower Harz Pond and Ditch System
- Upper Harz Water Regale
- Revierwasserlaufanstalt Freiberg

== Sources ==
- Wilfried Ließmann: Historischer Bergbau im Harz. 3rd ed., Springer, Berlin 1997, ISBN 978-3-540-31327-4
- Karl-Heinz Krause, Entwicklung und gegenwärtige Funktion von Anlagen der historischen bergbaulichen Wasserwirtschaft; in: Wilfried Strenz - Arbeitskreis Historische Geographie der Geographischen Gesellschaft der DDR, Historisch-geographische Forschungen in der DDR
- The Lower Harz Pond and Ditch System
