= Teufelsgrundbach =

River in Germany

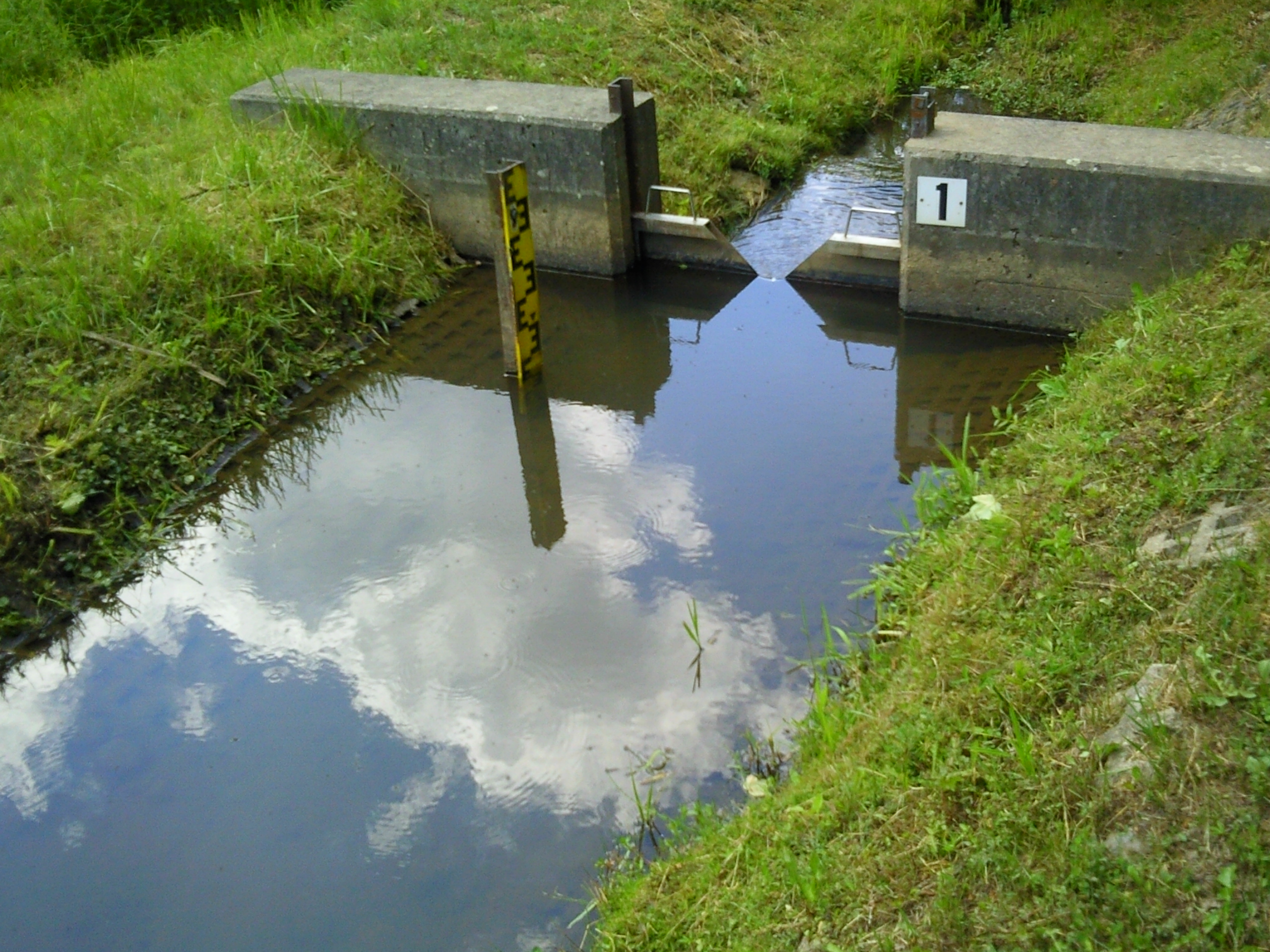
- Weir on the Teufelsgrundbach

Location
- Country: Germany
- State: Saxony-Anhalt
- Region: Lower Harz

Physical characteristics
- Mouth
  - location: near Silberhütte into the Selke
  - coordinates: 51°40′40″N 11°13′48″E

Basin features
- Progression: Selke→ Bode→ Saale→ Elbe→ North Sea
- Landmarks: Large towns: Harzgerode
- Waterbodies: Reservoirs: Teufelsteich, Fürstenteich, Silberhütter Pochwerksteich

The Creek Teufelsgrundbach, also Teufelsbach, is a tributary of the Selke in the Lower Harz in Saxony-Anhalt in Germany. The stream flows through the valley of the Teufelsgrund (transl.: Devils valley).

== See also ==
- List of rivers of Saxony-Anhalt
