= Gräfingründer Teich =

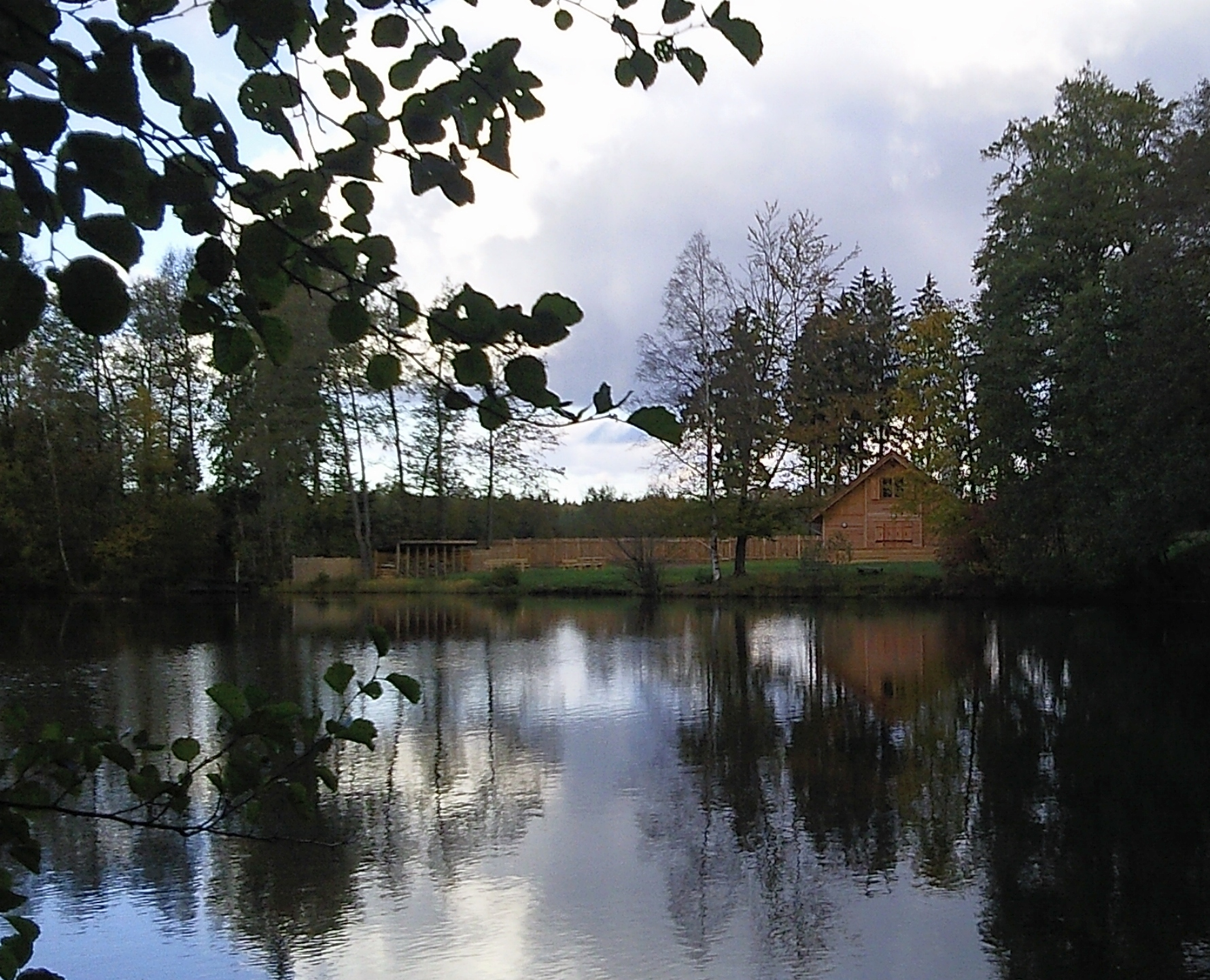

- Location within Germany
- Location: Saxony-Anhalt, Germany
- Coordinates: 51°36′49″N 10°59′40″E

The Gräfingründer Teich, also called Grauer Teich is a reservoir near Straßberg in the German state of Saxony-Anhalt. Part of the Lower Harz Pond and Ditch System, it impounds an unnamed stream.
