= Fürstenteich =

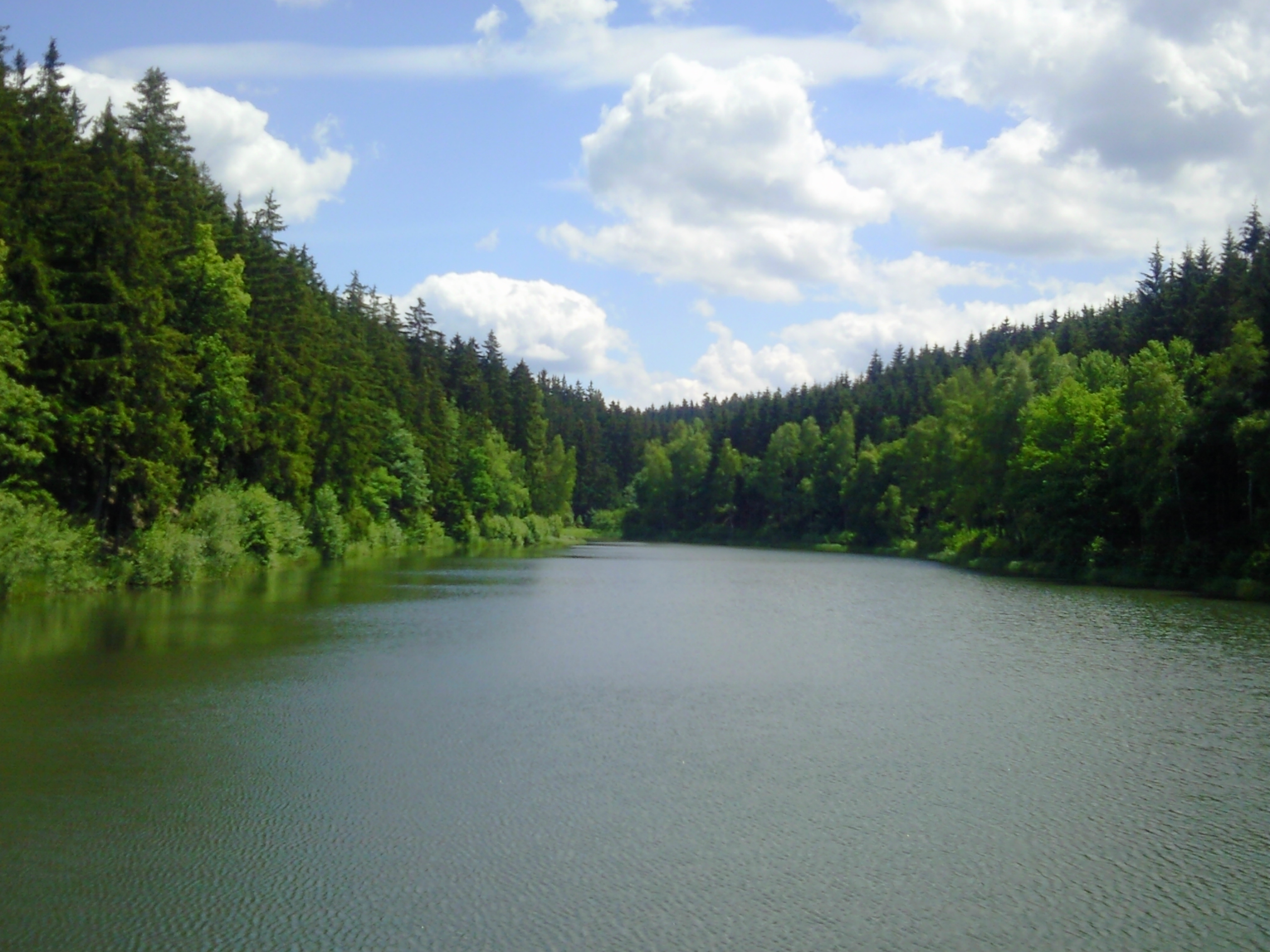
- View from the dam towards the head of the reservoir
- Interactive map of Fürstenteich
- Coordinates: 51.708106°N 11.259949°E
- Construction began: 1729

Dam and spillways
- Impounds: Teufelsgrundbach
- Length: 110 m (360 ft)
- Elevation at crest: 13.4 m (44 ft)
- Width (crest): 4 m (13 ft)

Reservoir
- Total capacity: 31,800 m^{3} (1,120,000 cu ft)
- Active capacity: 97,000 m^{3} (3,400,000 cu ft)
- Surface area: 2.5 ha (6.2 acres)
- Normal elevation: 357.5 m (1,173 ft) above HN

The Fürstenteich is a reservoir near Silberhütte in the German state of Saxony-Anhalt. It has an earth-filled dam with an impervious core. It impounds the Teufelsgrundbach stream.

== Construction ==
The dam was based on sedimented shale and has an internal impervious core of organic clays (grass sods). During renovation work about 70 cm of the surface layer on the old downstream face was removed and replaced by layers of shale material. That was covered with a 10 cm thick layer of topsoil sown with grass seed. On the upstream side, 60 cm was removed and on a 30 cm thick layer of stone chippings a similarly thick protective layer of ballast. The dam was also raised in height by about 1 metre. After removing 90 cm of the old dam crest, a metre-wide toe wall was integrated from the subgrade (Planum). This extends as far as the cohesive earth material of the old dam core.

The old wooden outlet channel (Striegelgerinne) is still there, but no longer functioning. It has since been linked to the seepage water measurement shaft (Sickerwasser-Messschacht) by a steel pipe. During the construction phase in 1903/04 a cast iron siphon pipe was laid, which crossed the spillway. The siphon pipe has a vent in the concrete ring on the dam crest. In 1990 the cast iron ring was cut by the spillway and has since emptied via a new outlet into the plunge pool of the spillway. The spillway consists of a reinforced concrete channel with 18 sections. Its total length is about 95 m.

== History ==
The reservoir was built in 1729 as a stamp mill pond and supplied, together with the higher-situated Teufelsteich, driving water for the silver works in the village of Silberhütte named after the works. The dam faces were relatively steep with an incline of 1:1.7 until the renovation work in 1984. The Fürstenteich was first linked into the Lower Harz Pond and Ditch System in 1903/04, when the dam was raised for the first time. The Kochsgraben was extended for the last time and now ended in the catchment area of the Teufelsteich, the Siebengrund bottom. This extension was called the Siebengründer Graben; at the same time the section to Neudorf was drained dry. Now the Teufelsteich as well as the Fürstenteich and the Silberhütter Pochwerksteich were additionally supplied with water from the Lude stream and the Rödelbachgraben. When the silver works went bankrupt in 1937 the reservoir was used to generate electricity until 1939 and then the ditch was drained dry.

The reservoir was used from 1937 to 1997 for the supply of drinking water. In 1980 the first problems arose on the dam which had now become overgrown with trees and bushes. The bottom outlet no longer work and seepage began to occur in places. From 1984 to 1987 the dam was overhauled and the faces relaid at an incline of 1:2. The last renovations took place in 1997 and 1999, when a new bottom outlet was fitted and the dam crest replace. Due to subsidence on the upstream side of the dam the water level dropped by about a metre.

The pond may be reached from the neighbouring Teufelsteich over hiking trails and is used for water management, angling and recreation.

== See also ==
- List of dams and reservoirs in Germany

== Sources ==
Talsperren in Sachsen-Anhalt, Autorenkollegium, Hrsg. Talsperrenmeisterei des Landes Sachsen-Anhalt 1994
