= Stollgraben =

River in Germany

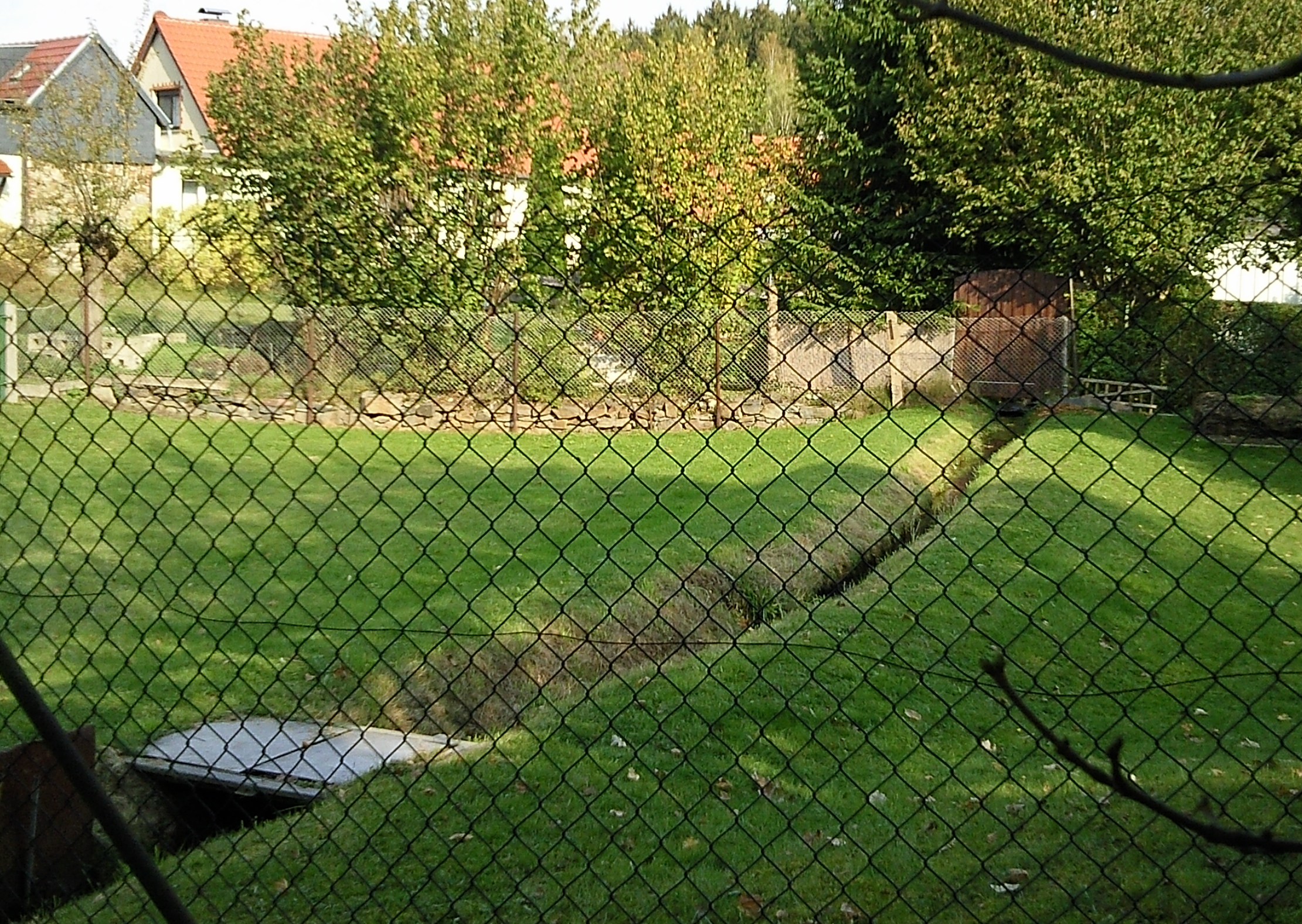
- The Flösse in the village

Location
- Country: Germany
- State: Saxony-Anhalt
- Region: Lower Harz
- Municipality: Straßberg

Physical characteristics
- Source
  - location: Start: below Kiliansteich at the Rödelbach
  - coordinates: 51°36′19″N 11°01′34″E
  - elevation: < 425 m above sea level (NN)
- Mouth
  - location: in Straßberg, at kilometre 56.0 into the Selke
  - coordinates: 51°37′05″N 11°03′05″E
  - elevation: ca. 405 m (1,329 ft)
- Length: 3.5 km (2.2 mi)

Basin features
- Progression: Selke→ Bode→ Saale→ Elbe→ North Sea
- Landmarks: Small towns: Harzgerode
- Population: < 1,000
- Tributaries
  - right: Graben vom Glasebach, Glasebacher Zulaufgraben

The Stollgraben is an old artificial watercourse in Saxony-Anhalt, Germany.

== See also ==
- List of rivers of Saxony-Anhalt
