= Glasebacher Teich =

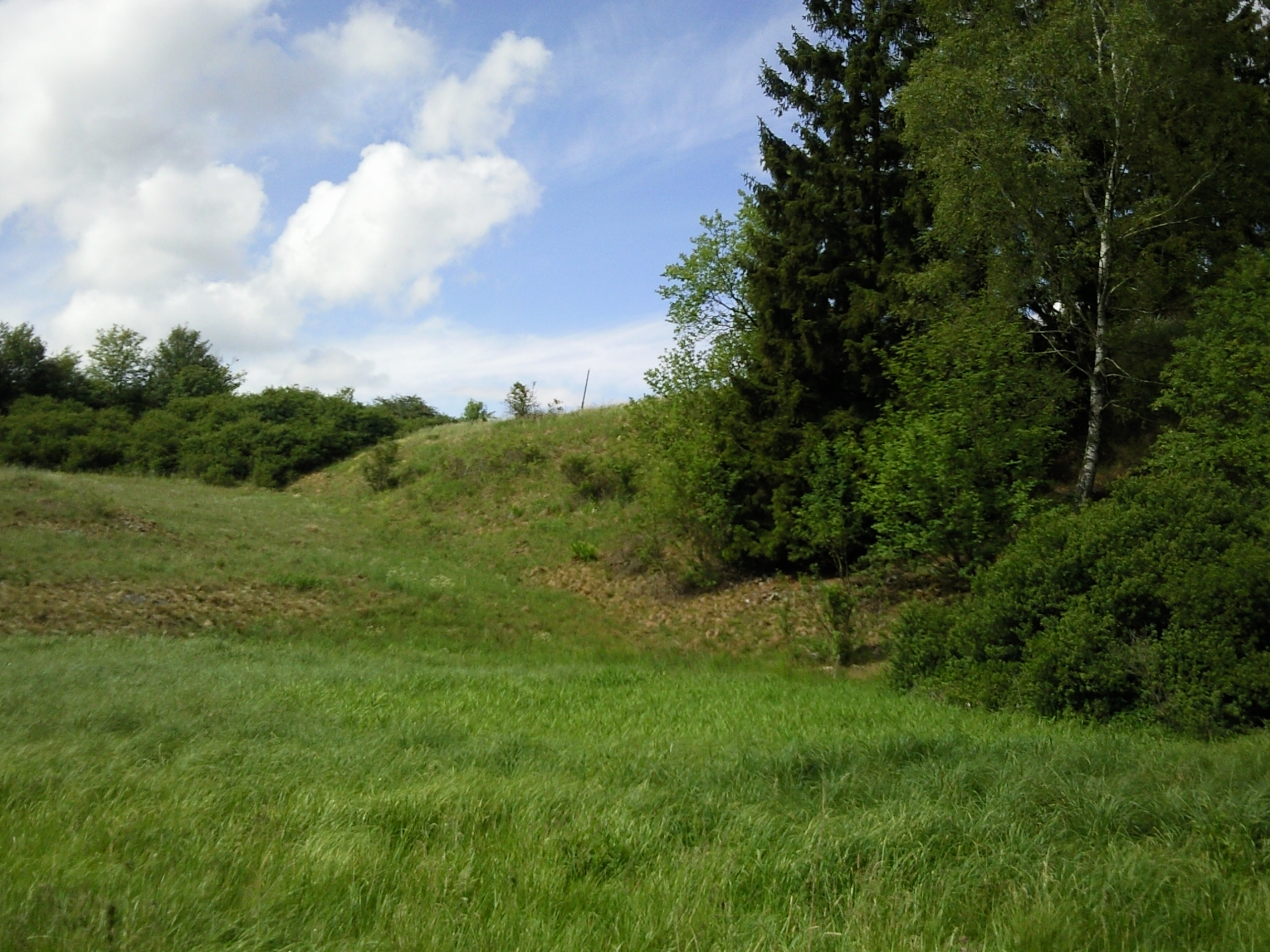
- The dam of the Glasebacher Teich
- Interactive map of Glasebacher Teich
- Location: Harz district, Harz Mountains, Germany
- Coordinates: 51.609466°N 11.060792°E
- Construction began: 1716

Reservoir
- Active capacity: 300,000 m^{3} (11,000,000 cu ft)
- Note: the dam broke in 1752 and was not restored.

The Glasebacher Teich was an artificial reservoir or Kunstteich laid out near the village of Straßberg in the Harz Mountains of Germany for mining purposes. With a capacity of about 300,000 m³ it was the second largest pond in the Lower Harz. It impounded the Glasebach stream.

== History ==
The pond was a water reservoir to supply water power for mining and smelting. The water was used to power mine shafts, stamp mills, water mills and smelteries. The pond was laid in 1716 under the direction of mining director (Bergwerksdirektor), Christian Zacharias Koch. Due to a storm, the dam broke in 1752, after which the sluice valve and drainage outlet (Striegelanlage) could no longer be operated. The deluge of water released by the dam break destroyed the Bärloch Mill (Bärlochsmühle) at the end of the valley.

The surviving section of the dam belongs today to the heritage area known as the Lower Harz Pond and Ditch System.
