= Büschengraben =

River in Germany

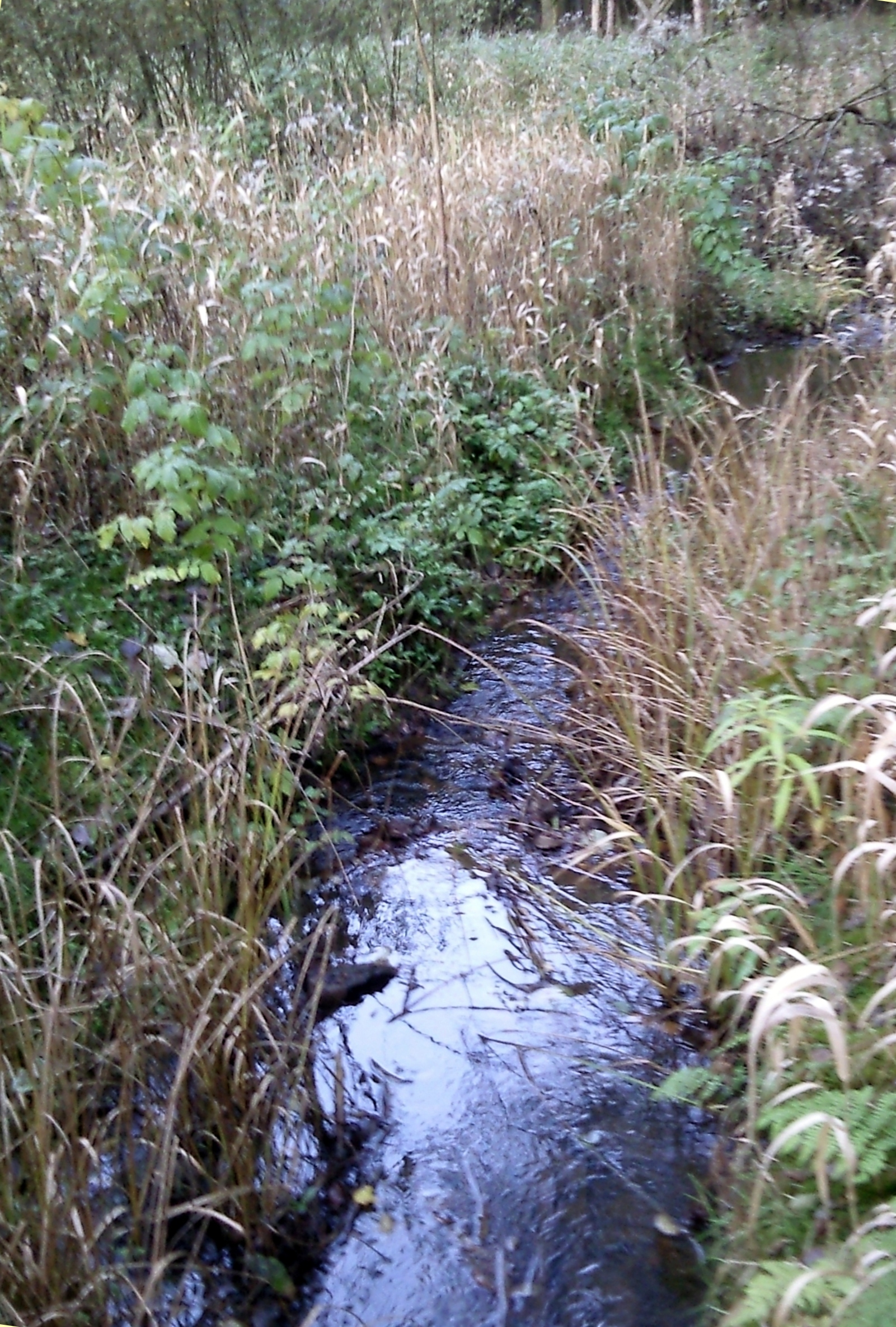

Location
- Country: Germany
- State: Saxony-Anhalt

Physical characteristics
- Mouth
  - coordinates: 51.6021°N 11.0320°E

Basin features
- Progression: Rödelbach→ Selke→ Bode→ Saale→ Elbe→ North Sea

Büschengraben is a river of Saxony-Anhalt, Germany. It flows into the Rödelbach near Straßberg.

== See also ==
- List of rivers of Saxony-Anhalt
