= Große Wilde =

River in Germany

Location
- Country: Germany
- States: Saxony-Anhalt

Physical characteristics
- Mouth
  - location: Thyra
  - coordinates: 51°34′24″N 10°51′18″E

Basin features
- Progression: Thyra→ Helme→ Unstrut→ Saale→ Elbe→ North Sea

Große Wilde is a river of Saxony-Anhalt, Germany. At its confluence with the Lude in Stolberg (Harz), the Thyra is formed.

== See also ==
- List of rivers of Saxony-Anhalt
