= Bärlochsmühle =

Former watermill in Germany

Coordinates: 51°37′07″N 11°03′27″E

The Bärlochsmühle is a former mill near Straßberg in the Harz mountains in Central Germany.

The mill is located near the point where the Glasebach stream enters the river Selke and is linked to an iron works that was first mentioned in the records in 1467. At that time the two counts, Henry of Schwarzburg and Henry of Stolberg enfeoffed a meadow "bene den Strasberg nie unser Hutten" to the brothers Röder and von Harz, amongst others. After Straßberg was ceded to the state of Anhalt this enfeoffment was reaffirmed in 1511 by Prince Wolfgang of Anhalt. This iron works existed until at least 1566. Furthermore, it is probably that this mill was associated closely with the village of Birnbaum that was abandoned in the 15th century.

== Sources ==
- Eckhard Oelke; Elmar Hebestedt (2007), "Alte Hütten an der Selke", Der Anschnitt (in German), vol. 59, no. 6, pp. 193–194
