= Glasebach (Selke) =

River in Germany

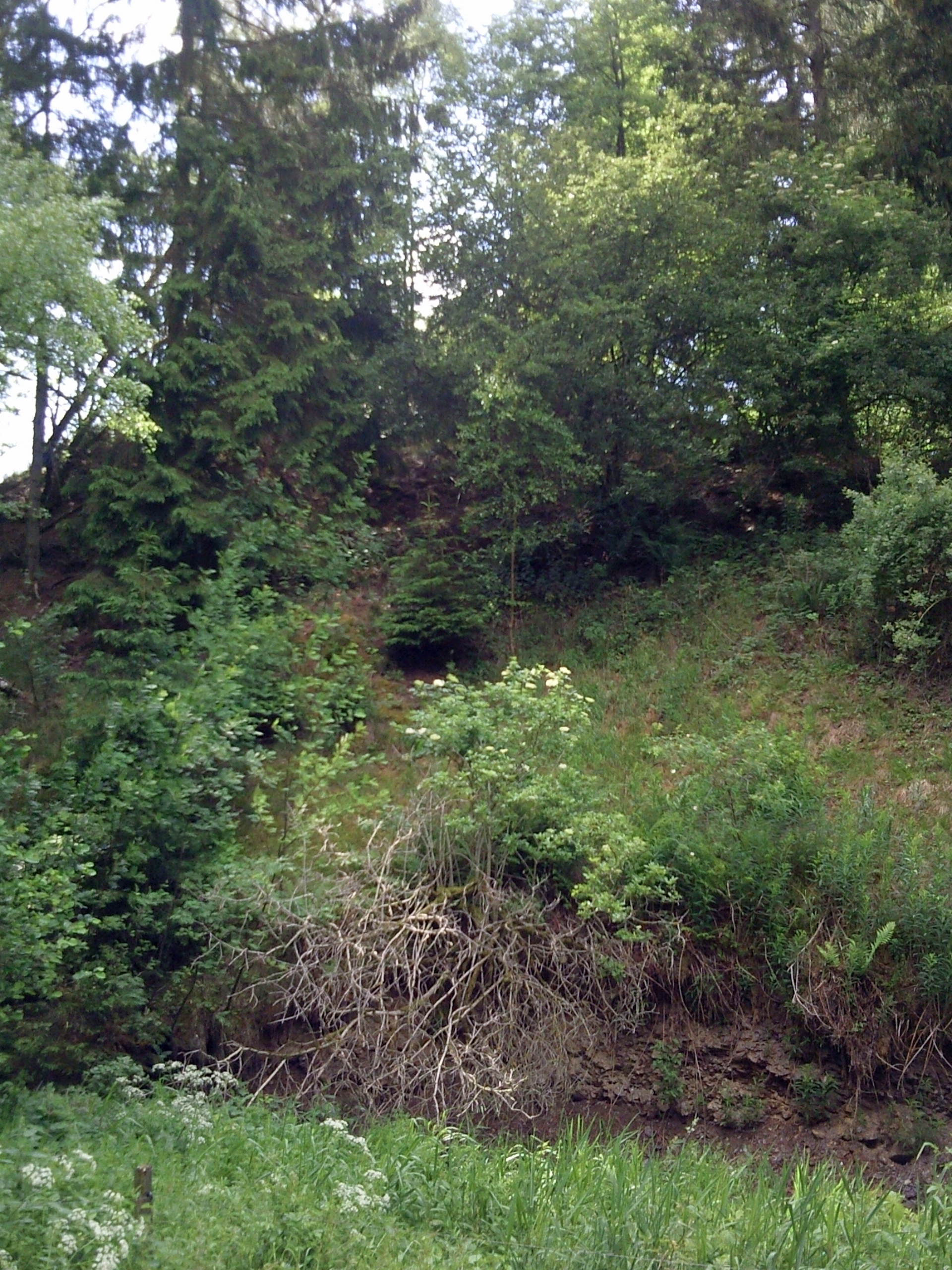

Location
- Country: Germany
- States: Saxony-Anhalt

Physical characteristics
- Mouth
  - location: Selke
  - coordinates: 51°37′08″N 11°03′26″E

Basin features
- Progression: Selke→ Bode→ Saale→ Elbe→ North Sea

The Glasebach is a river of Saxony-Anhalt, Germany. It flows into the Selke on the right bank, east of Straßberg near the Bärlochsmühle.

== See also ==
- List of rivers of Saxony-Anhalt
