= Thyra (river) =

River in Germany

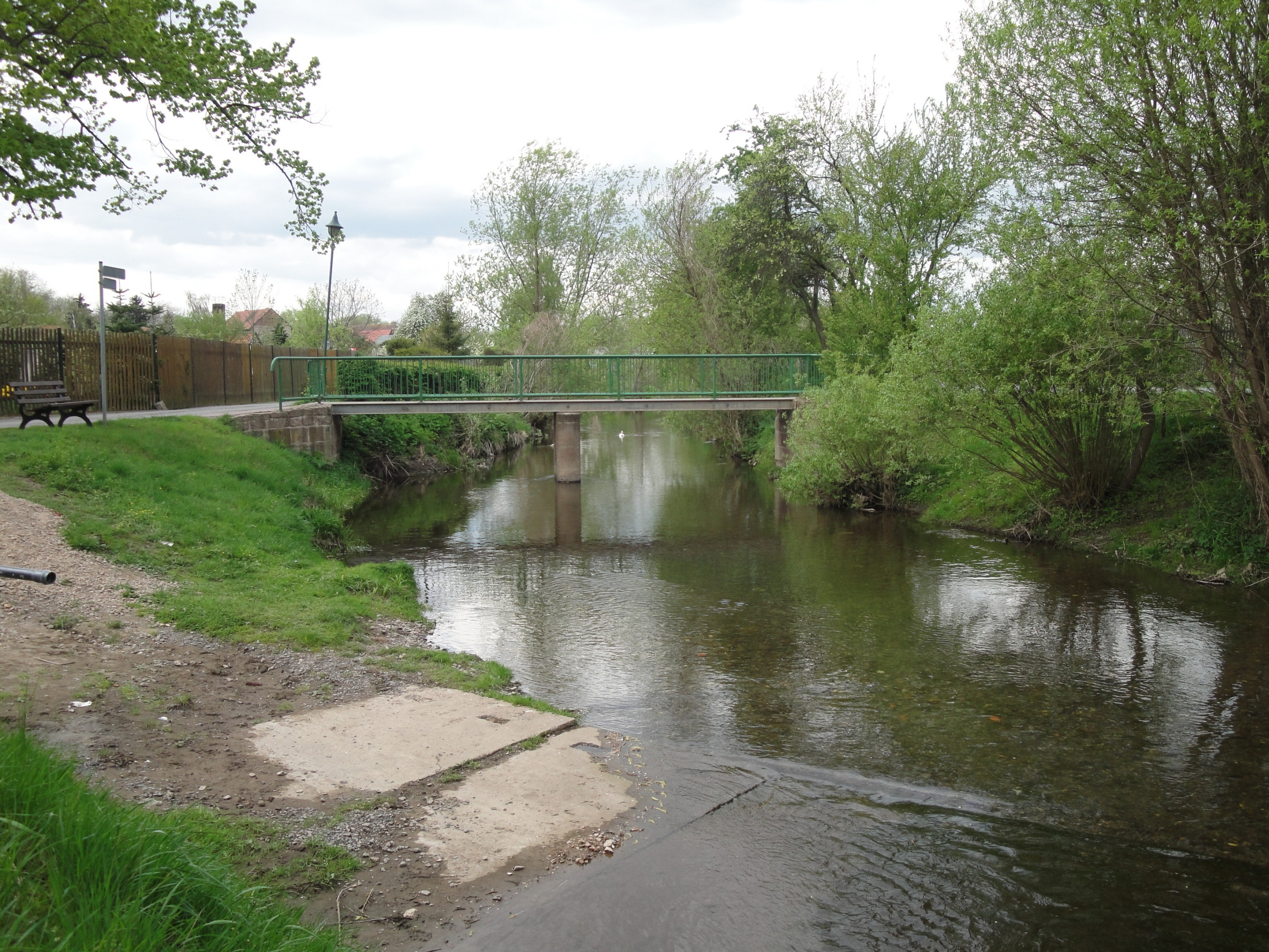
- The Thyra in Berga

Location
- Country: Germany
- State: Saxony-Anhalt
- District: Mansfeld-Südharz

Physical characteristics
- Source
  - location: in Stolberg
  - coordinates: 51°34′22″N 10°57′17″E
  - elevation: 410 m (1,350 ft)
- Mouth
  - location: in the Helme
  - coordinates: 51°26′29″N 11°00′54″E
  - elevation: 152 m above NN
- Length: 20 km (12 mi)
- Discharge
  - location: at Stolberg gauge
  - average: 0.418 m^{3}/s (14.8 cu ft/s)
  - minimum: Record low: 0.008 m^{3}/s (0.28 cu ft/s) (in 2003); Average low: 0.044 m^{3}/s (1.6 cu ft/s)
  - maximum: Average high: 5.19 m^{3}/s (183 cu ft/s); Record high: 19.6 m^{3}/s (690 cu ft/s) (in 1955)

Basin features
- Progression: Helme→ Unstrut→ Saale→ Elbe→ North Sea
- Landmarks: Villages: Südharz, Berga
- Bridges: Thyra Viaduct
- Navigable: no

The Thyra is a 20-kilometre-long (12 mi) river of Saxony-Anhalt, Germany, in the district of Mansfeld-Südharz in the Harz Mountains.

== Course ==
The Thyra begins its course in the old quarter of Stolberg in the Harz Mountains at the confluence of three mountain streams - the Große Wilde, Kleine Wilde and Lude - and then flows through Stolberg, where several streams join it, before heading south through a steep valley to Rottleberode. Here the Thyra valley becomes very wide, but near Uftrungen it narrows again. South of Uftrungen the Thyra leaves the Harz and enters the Goldene Aue, crossing Bösenrode and Berga, before this little river enters the Helme.

== Influence ==
Several things are named after the Thyra, for example the Thyra thermal baths (Thyratherme) in Stolberg or the railway line known as the Thyraliesel.

== See also ==
- List of rivers of Saxony-Anhalt
