= Teufelsteich =

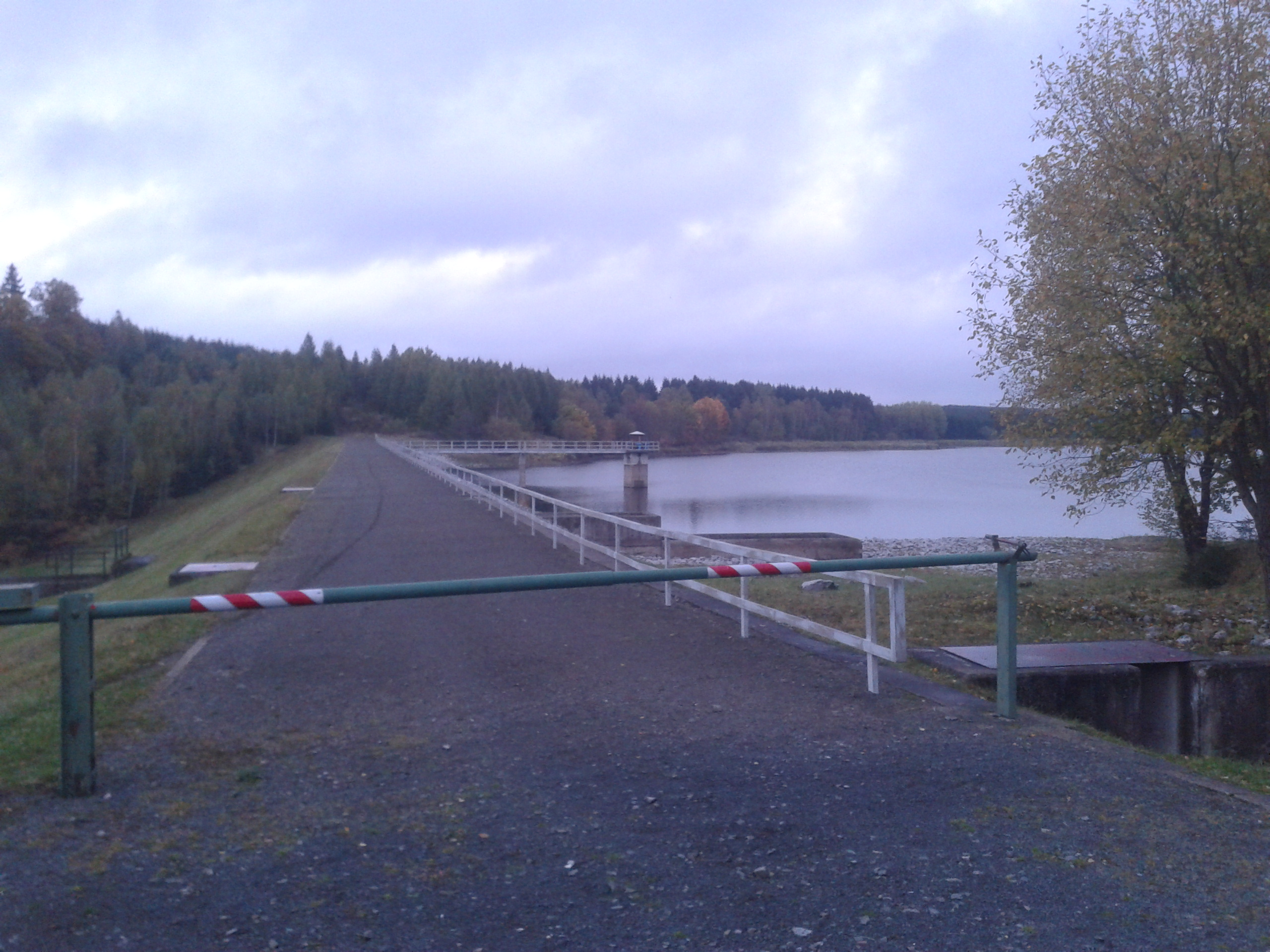
- The Teufelsteich
- Interactive map of Teufelsteich
- Location: Harz district, Saxony-Anhalt, Germany
- Coordinates: 51.62111°N 11.11889°E
- Construction began: 1696/97

Dam and spillways
- Impounds: Teufelsgrundbach
- Height (foundation): 20.3 m (67 ft)
- Height (thalweg): 18.3 m (60 ft)
- Length: 211 m (692 ft)
- Elevation at crest: 397.15 m (1,303.0 ft)
- Width (crest): 7 m (23 ft)
- Dam volume: 77,500 m^{3} (2,740,000 cu ft)

Reservoir
- Total capacity: 0.80×10^{6} m^{3} (28×10^{6} cu ft)
- Active capacity: 0.76×10^{6} m^{3} (27×10^{6} cu ft)
- Catchment area: 3.2 km^{2} (1.2 sq mi)
- Surface area: 19 ha (47 acres)
- Normal elevation: 395.50 m (1,297.6 ft)

The Teufelsteich was one of the oldest reservoirs in the Harz Mountains of central Germany.

It was built in 1697 near Harzgerode and Quedlinburg (in the present state of Saxony-Anhalt) for mining purposes. In 1837/38 it was raised to support silver mining.

The Teufelsteich was first linked to the Lower Harz Pond and Ditch System in 1903/04. The Kochsgraben was extended for the last time and it now ended in the catchment area of the Teufelsteich, the Siebengrund bottom. This extension was called the Siebengründer Graben; at the same time the section to Neudorf was drained dry. The Teufelsteich was now supplied with water from the Lude stream and the Rödelbachgraben along with the nearby mining ponds of the Fürstenteich and the Silberhütter Pochwerksteich.

In 1947 the pond was used for the first time to supply drinking water. In 1985 the embankment had to be completely replaced. To do this a new dam was built 30 m below the old one and the old dam removed.

The new, higher dam consists of a shale body with a clay core in the centre. The retaining capacity of the new dam is around 203,000 m³ greater. The reservoir now has new facilities such as a spillway, a bottom outlet, a glory hole spillway (Entnahmeturm) with service jetty, a valve house and a pump station. The impounded stream is the Teufelsgrundbach.

== See also ==
- List of dams and reservoirs in Germany

== Sources ==
- Talsperren in Sachsen-Anhalt, Autorenkollegium, Hrsg.: Talsperrenmeisterei des Landes Sachsen-Anhalt, 1994
