= Rödelbach =

River in Germany

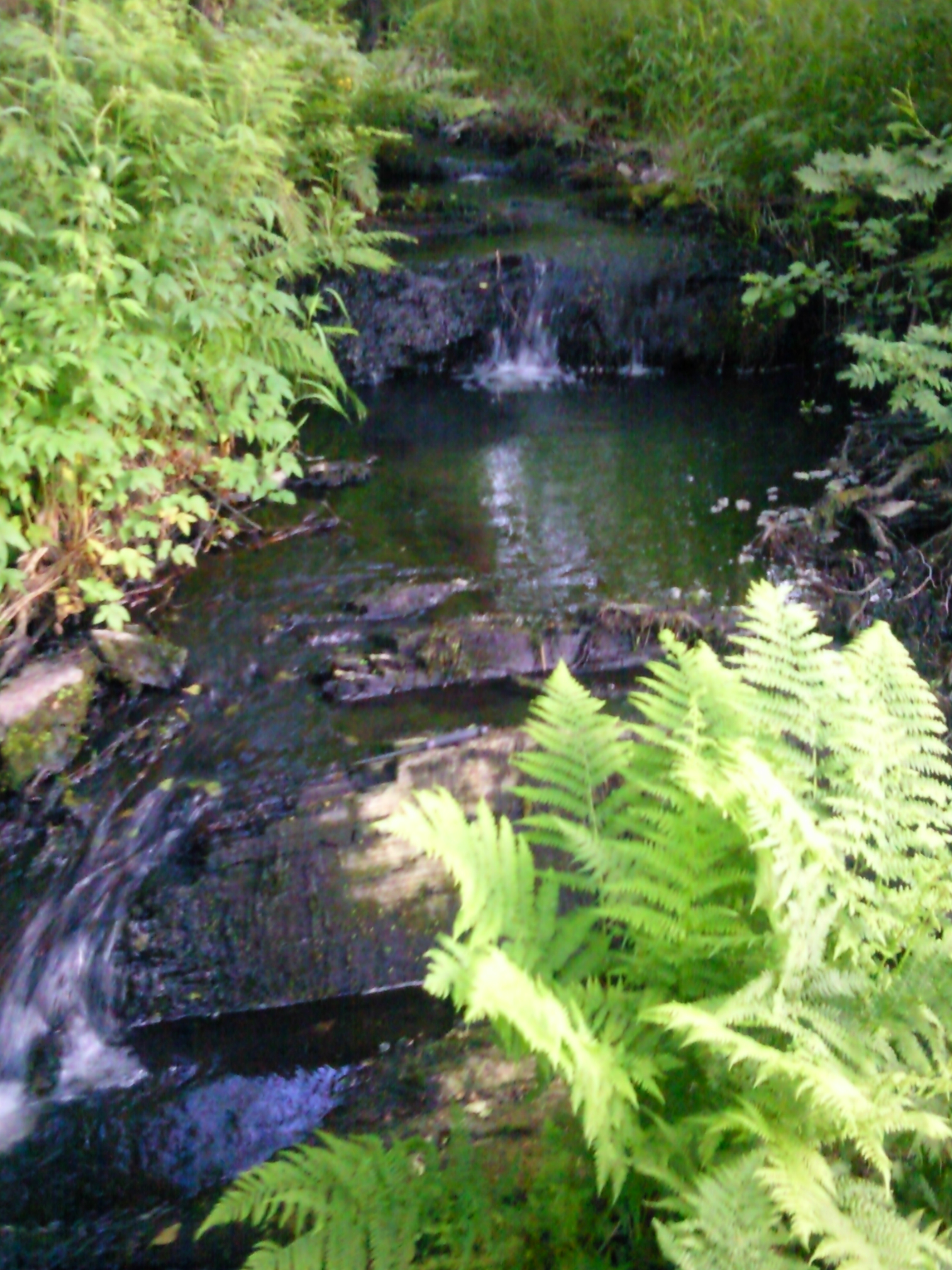
- The Rödelbachgraben just behind the Maliniusteich pond

Location
- Country: Germany
- State: Saxony-Anhalt
- Region: Lower Harz
- Reference no.: DE: 568418

Physical characteristics
- Source
  - location: Kiliansteich Dam
  - coordinates: 51°36′17″N 11°01′25″E
- Mouth
  - location: in Straßberg into the Selke

Basin features
- Progression: Selke→ Bode→ Saale→ Elbe→ North Sea
- Tributaries
  - right: Stollgraben, Dorfgraben
- Waterbodies: Reservoirs: Maliniusteich
- Navigable: no

The Rödelbachgraben, usually called the Rödelbach and also incorrectly referred to as the Rieschengraben, is a river of Saxony-Anhalt, Germany.

It which was altered for mining purposes. It is the oldest fully functioning part of the Lower Harz Pond and Ditch System in the Harz Mountains of Germany. The ditch was first mentioned in the records as the Oberer Rödelbachgraben in the year 1610.

== History ==
Neither the builder nor the exact date of construction are known. Due to the mining activity within the Rödelbach valley near Straßberg in the 16th and 17th centuries, it was probably built in the late 16th century.

The first documented mention in the Straßberg land register in 1610 records the structure as oberer Rödelbachgraben mit Dorfrösche, the name changed from Röschengraben to Rödelbach. Originally it was fed from the first Kiliansteich, later the Lower Kiliansteich – today part of the Kiliansteich Reservoir. The water then went directly to the pond Maliniusteich as well as via the Frankenteich to the Maliniusteich. Here part of the water flowed around the silting up zone where it was united with another headwater, probably a natural stream. From the outlet of the Maliniusteich the water flows along the Straßberger Mühlengraben into the River Selke.

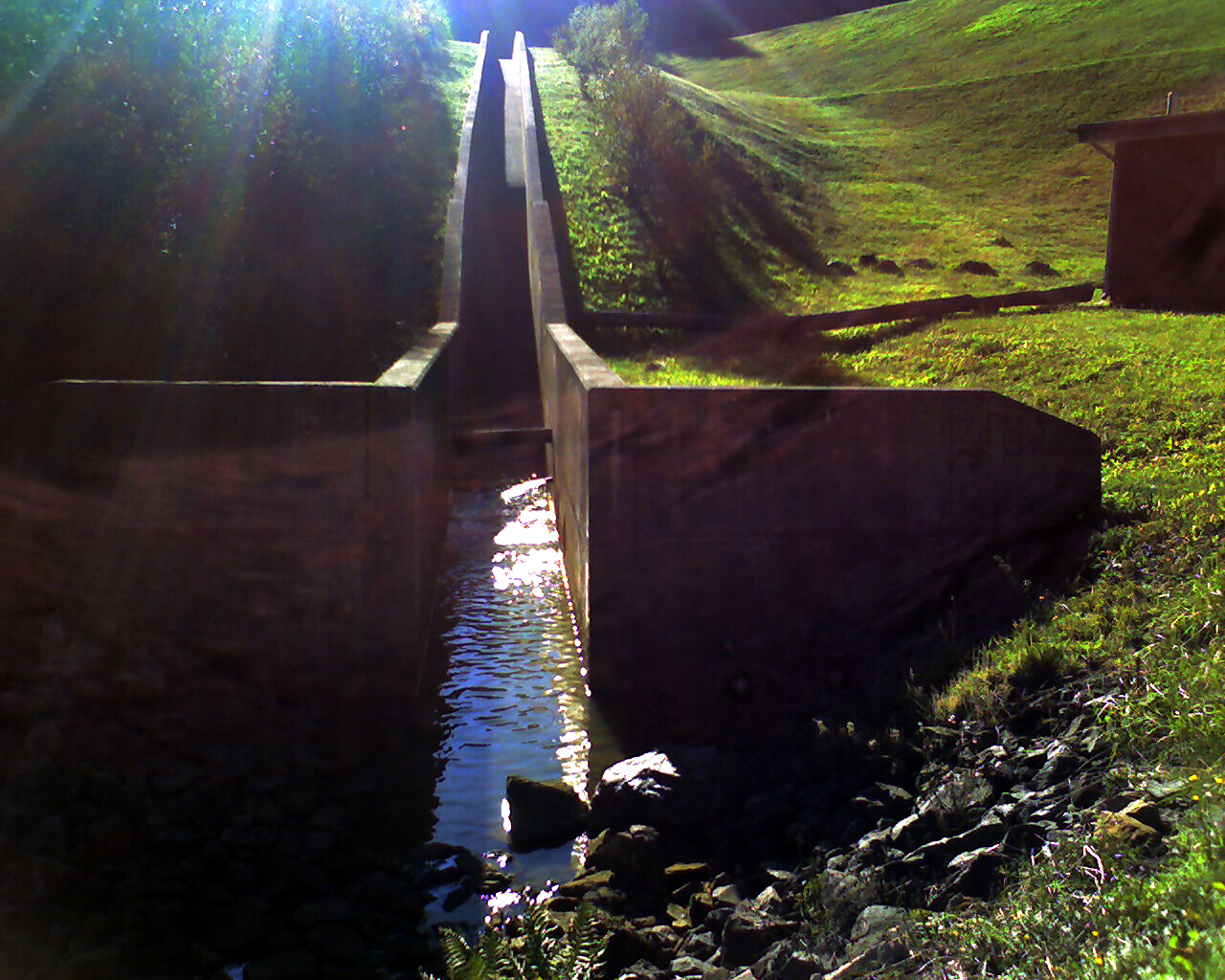
The source of the Rödelbach at the Kiliansteich

In renovating the Kiliansteiche and the associated building of the Kiliansteich Dam and reservoir, the retention of the channel was secured at a constant flow rate of 4 litres per second (1.1 USgal/s).

== Waterfall ==
Immediately behind the Maliniusteich the Rödelbachgraben runs over a small waterfall. Visible traces of stone working indicate that it was at least partially man-made. The water pours over a staircase-like cascade. The height difference from top to bottom is not great.

== Tributaries ==
The Rödelbachgraben is fed by the Büschengraben that discharges into the Kiliansteich pond. Below the Maliniusteich there exist in place long disused tributaries from collection ditches (Sammelgräben). In addition the Malinusteich has other small tributaries. Directly behind the Kiliansteich the Stollengraben branches off to the right.

== See also ==
- List of rivers of Saxony-Anhalt
