= Birnbaumteich =

Dam in Germany

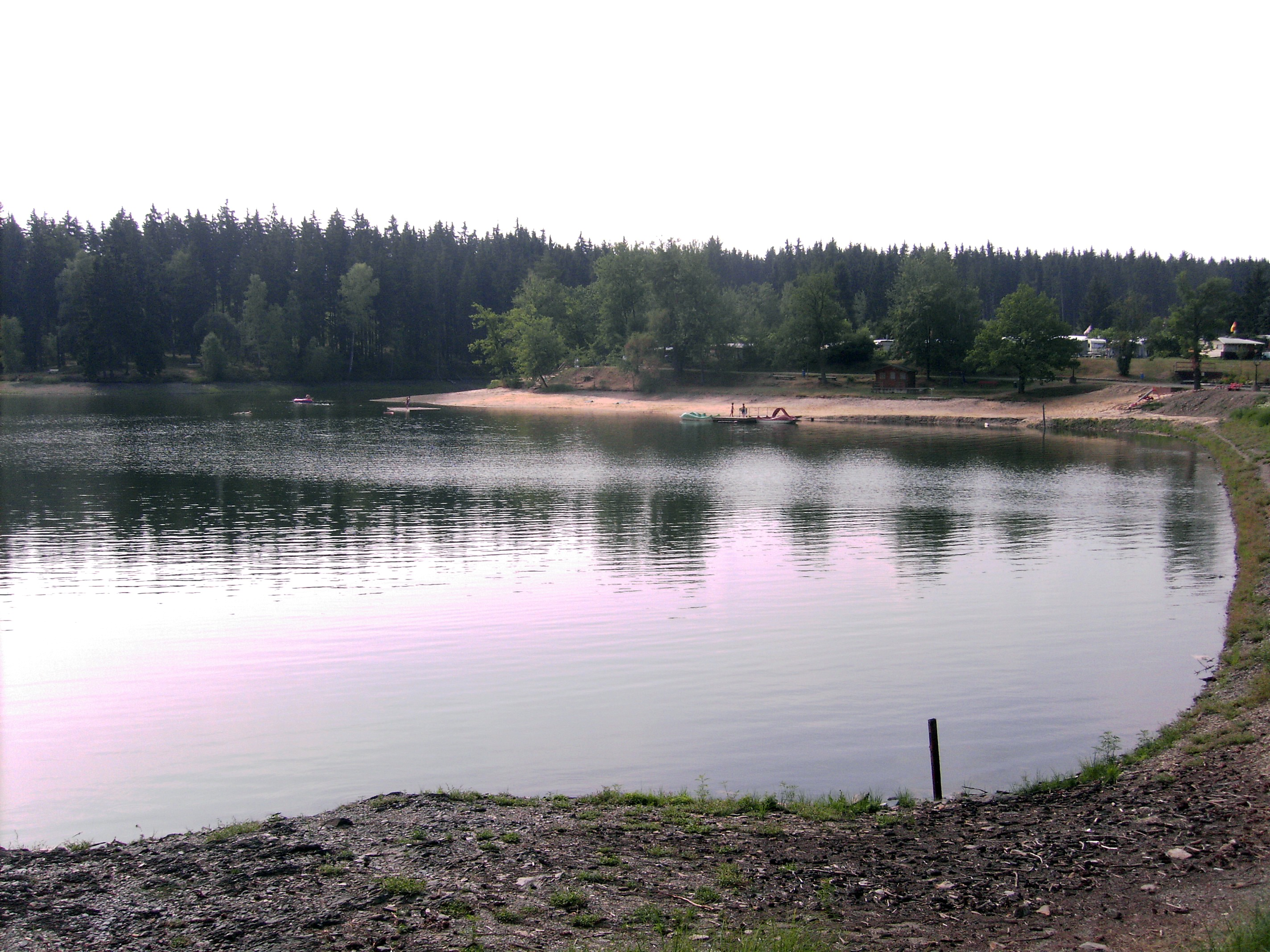
- Interactive map of Birnbaumteich
- Country: Germany
- Coordinates: 51°36′51″N 11°05′28″E
- Opening date: 1699

Dam and spillways
- Height: 13.4 m (44 ft)
- Length: 140 m (460 ft)
- Width (crest): 8 m
- Dam volume: 30,000 m³
- Spillway capacity: 2.4 m³/s

Reservoir
- Total capacity: 0.19 million m³
- Catchment area: 1.88 km²
- Surface area: 4.5 ha

The Birnbaumteich is a reservoir in the German state of Saxony-Anhalt, located near Neudorf in the Harz mountains.

== History ==
It was completed in 1699 and taken into service for mining operations in the Neudorf mining district. In 1963 the dam had to be repaired because its penstock had collapsed. In 1967 the dam was once again in operation. The reservoir has since been used for recreational purposes. There are bathing areas, a campsite and the Birnbaumteich Holiday Park (Ferienpark Birnbaumteich) by the reservoir.

In summer 2006 the dam itself was refurbished.

== Design ==
The barrier of the Birnbaumteich is an earth-fill dam with an impervious core. In the older section the core consists of sods; the newer section around the penstock is of concrete. The spillway on the right abutment consists of a pipe culvert with a diameter of 1 m. The headwater stream is known as the Birnbaumgraben or Bach vom Birnbaumteich ("Birnbaumteich brook").

== See also ==
- List of dams in the Harz

== Sources ==
- Talsperren in Sachsen-Anhalt, Autorenkollegium, Hrsg.: Talsperrenmeisterei des Landes Sachsen-Anhalt, 1994
