= Pit water =

Water that collects in a mine

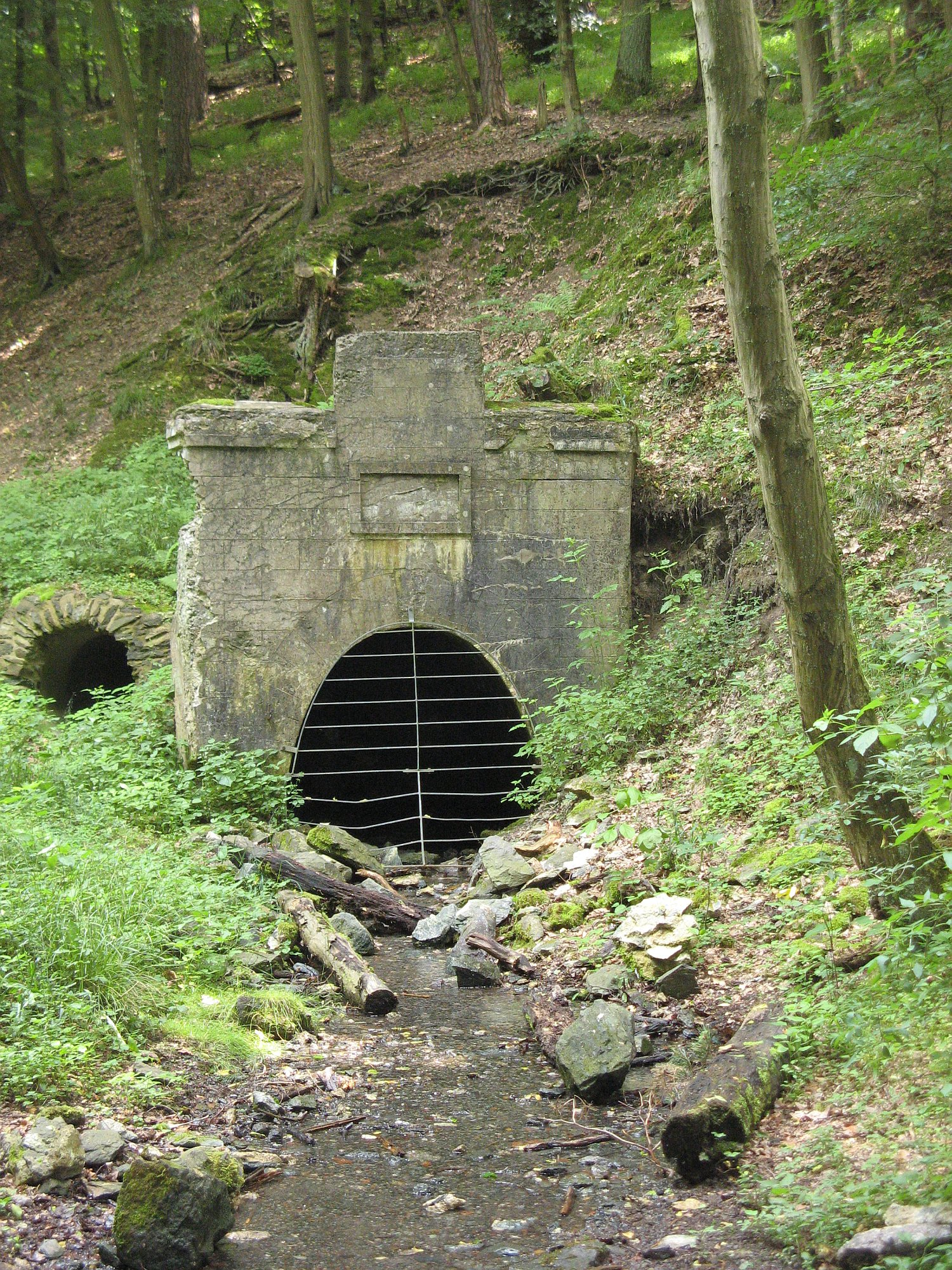
Mouth of the drainage adit, Magnet, near Schupbach.

Pit water, mine water or mining water is water that collects in a mine and which has to be brought to the surface by water management methods in order to enable the mine to continue working.

== Origin ==
Although all water that enters pit workings originates from atmospheric precipitation, the miner distinguishes between surface water and groundwater. Surface water enters the pit through openings in the mine at the surface of the ground, such as tunnel portals or shaft entrances. During heavy rain, water seeps into the earth and forms ground water when it meets layers of impervious rock. Pit water is mainly interstitial water and groundwater that seeps into the mine workings.

== See also ==
- Acid mine drainage

== Literature ==
- Friedrich P. Springer (2007), "Von Agricolas "pompen" im Bergbau, "die das wasser durch den windt gezogen", zu den Gestängetiefpumpen im Erdöl", Erdöl/Erdgas/Kohle Zeitschrift (in German), vol. Heft 10
- Ch. Wolkersdorfer (2008), Water Management at Abandoned Flooded Underground Mines – Fundamentals, Tracer Tests, Modelling, Water Treatment, Berlin: Springer, p. 466, ISBN 978-3-540-77330-6
- P. L. Younger; S. A. Banwart; R. S. Hedin (2002), Mine Water – Hydrology, Pollution, Remediation, Dordrecht: Kluwer, p. 464, ISBN 1-4020-0137-1
- P. L. Younger; N. S. Robins (2002), Mine Water Hydrogeology and Geochemistry, London: Spec. Publ. – Geol. Soc. London, p. 396, ISBN 978-1-86239-113-0
