= Kiliansteich =

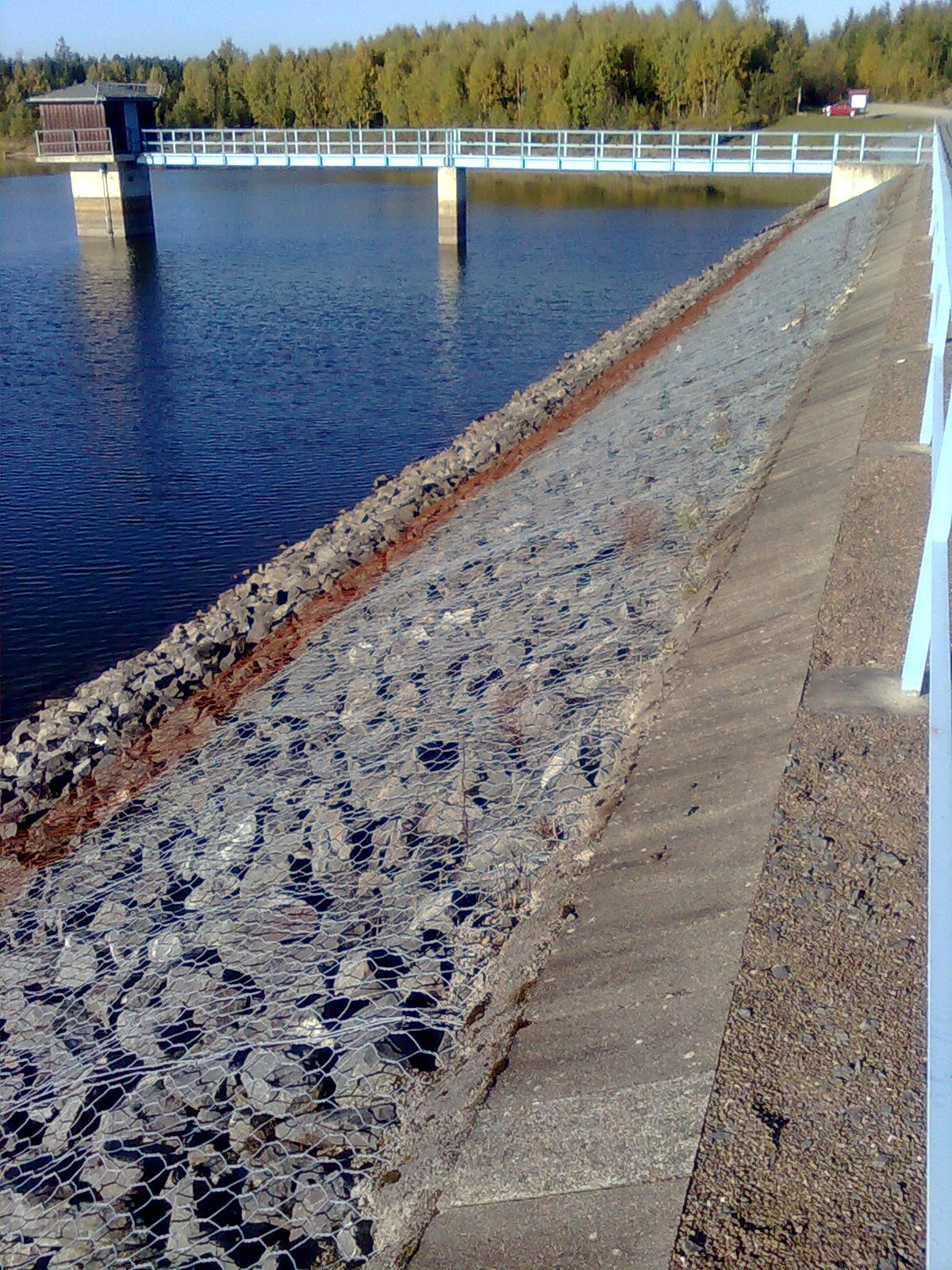
- Interactive map of Kiliansteich
- Location: Landkreis Harz
- Coordinates: 51.60611°N 11.02083°E
- Construction began: 1610, rebuilt 1989-1994

Dam and spillways
- Impounds: Büschengraben
- Height (foundation): 24.6 m (81 ft)
- Height (thalweg): 22.9 m (75 ft)
- Length: 210 m (690 ft)
- Elevation at crest: 442.23 m (1,450.9 ft)
- Width (crest): 4 m (13 ft)
- Dam volume: 93,000 m^{3} (3,300,000 cu ft)

Reservoir
- Total capacity: 1.26×10^{6} m^{3} (44×10^{6} cu ft)
- Active capacity: 1.19×10^{6} m^{3} (42×10^{6} cu ft)
- Catchment area: 3.9 km^{2} (1.5 sq mi)
- Surface area: 17.3 ha (43 acres)
- Normal elevation: 440.5 m (1,445 ft)

The Kiliansteich (literally "St. Kilian's Pond") is one of the oldest reservoirs in Germany. The reservoir is located near Straßberg (Harz) in the German state of Saxony-Anhalt and supplies drinking water. It impounds the Büschengraben stream. The lake is part of the heritage area (Flächendenkmal) of the Lower Harz Pond and Ditch System.

The reservoir has a rockfill dam with a watertight clay core that sits on a shale bedrock.

== History ==
Originally there were four small ponds in a row on the site of the present-day reservoir that had been built for the mining industry. Two of those were broken in 1901 and 1944 and all were in a poor condition. As a result, from 1989-1994 a new, higher dam was built at the site of the lowest dam; the two middle ponds were removed and the upper one, the Upper Kilian Pond (Oberer Kiliansteich), built in 1703, was upgraded into a pre-dam (Vorsperre).

Originally laid as a drinking water reservoir, the lake is used today for flood and drought protection.

The dam on the original "Lower Kilian Pond" (Unterer Kiliansteich) was about 10 m high and had a retaining capacity of 165,000 m³. During the course of renovation the old wooden bottom outlet was salvaged on 25 September 1990 as the result on an initiative by Erika and Siegfried Lorenz. Following long-term conservation work at the Harzwasserwerken in Clausthal-Zellerfeld, who paid for the cost of transports and conservation, it was returned on 19 August 2010 to Straßberg. The wooden raceway is now a museum piece in the Glasebach Pit.

== See also ==
- List of dams in Germany

== Sources ==
Talsperren in Sachsen-Anhalt, Autorenkollegium, Hrsg. Talsperrenmeisterei des Landes Sachsen-Anhalt 1994
