= Silberhütte (Harzgerode) =

- Ortsteil of Harzgerode
- Interactive map of Silberhütte
- Location within Germany Location within Saxony-Anhalt
- Coordinates: 51°37′40″N 11°05′29″E
- Country: Germany
- State: Saxony-Anhalt
- District: Harz
- Town: Harzgerode
- Elevation: 339 m (1,112 ft)
- Time zone: UTC+01:00 (CET)
  - Summer (DST): UTC+02:00 (CEST)
- Postal codes: 06493
- Dialling codes: 039484

Silberhütte is a village in the town of Harzgerode in the district of Harz in the German state of Saxony-Anhalt. Its name means "silver works", a place where silver ore is smelted.

== Geography ==
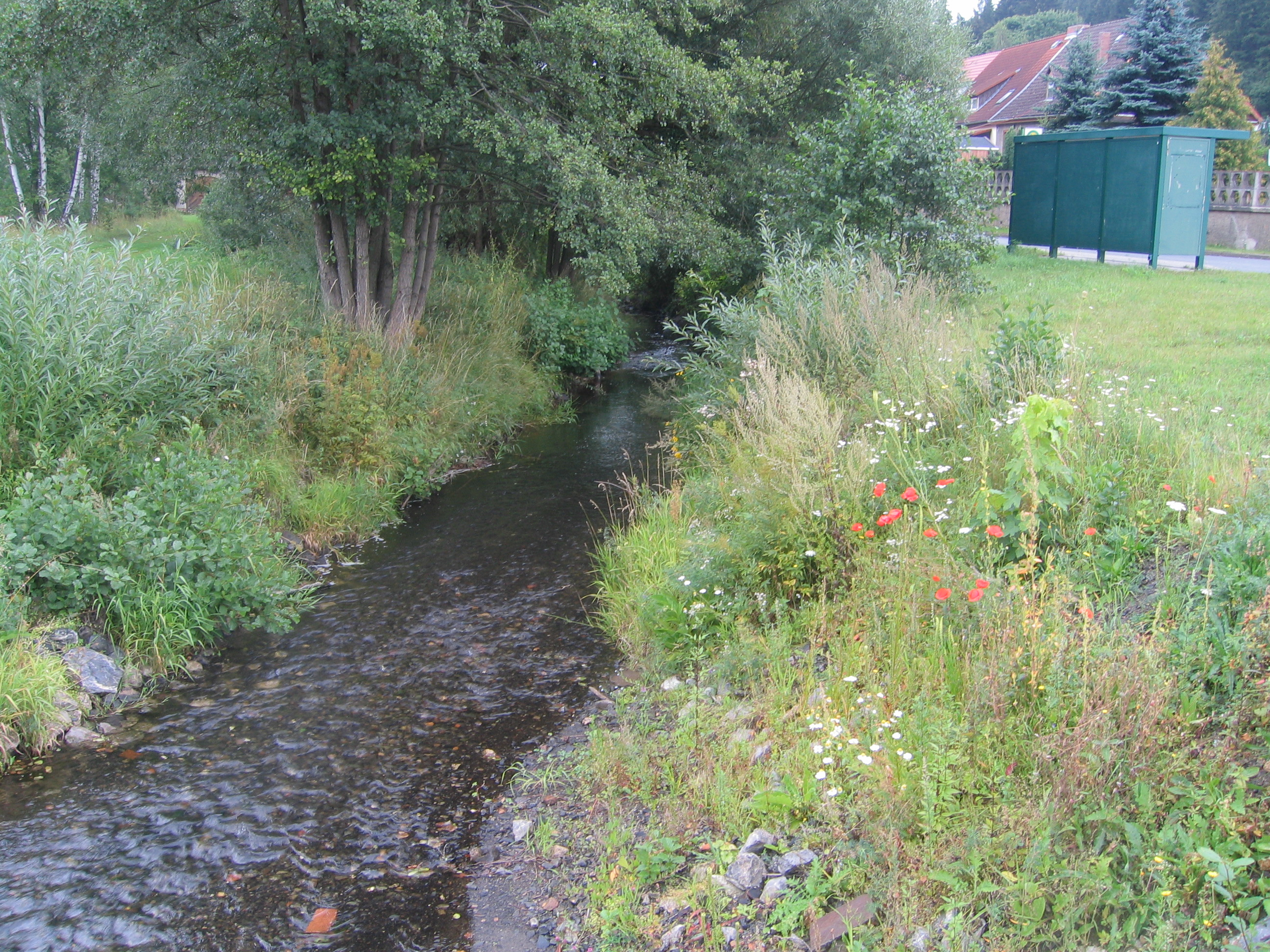
The River Selke at Silberhütte

Silberhütte lies in the Selke valley of the Lower Harz.

== History ==
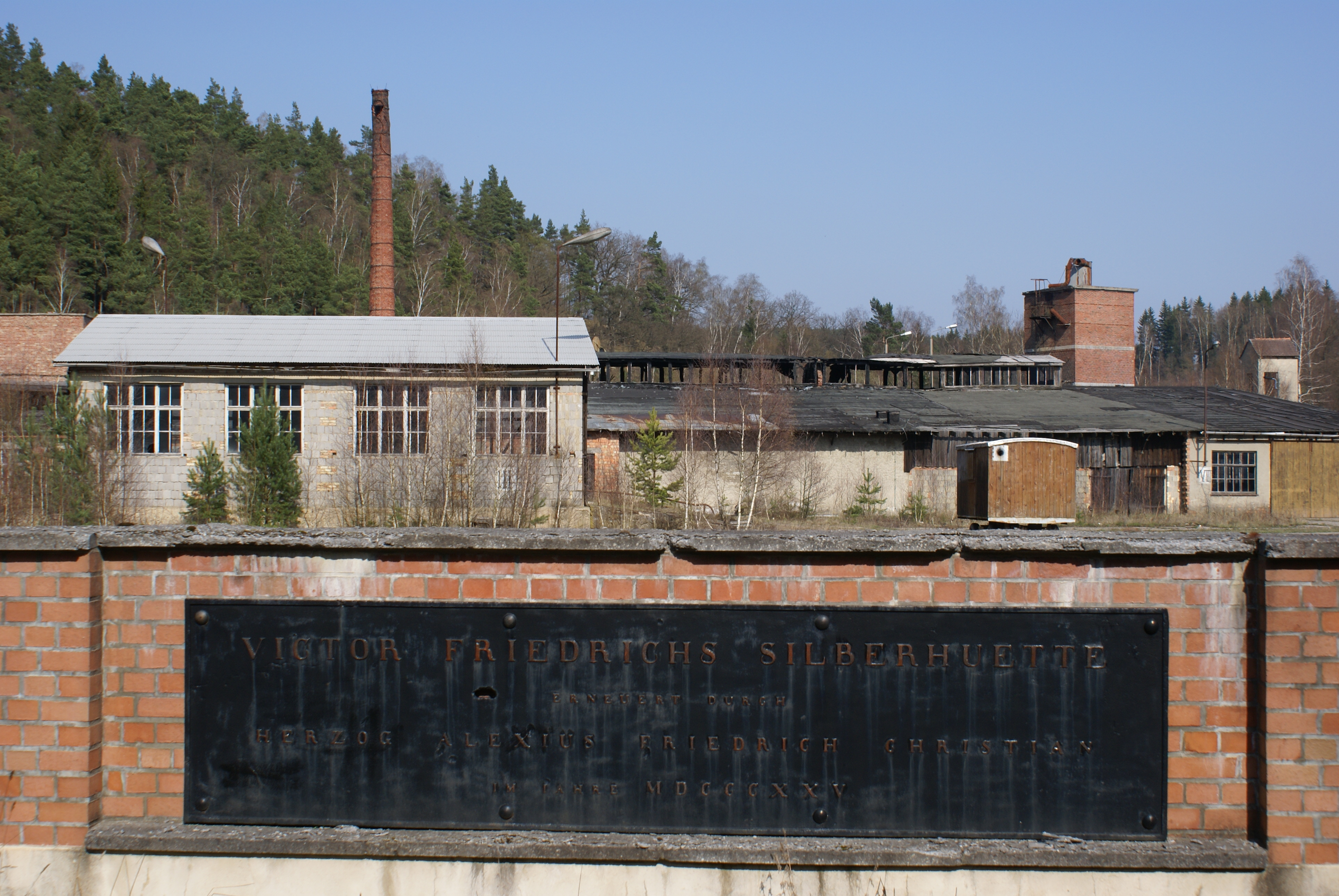
The derelict silver works

The first recorded mention of Silberhütte dates to the year 1692, which is also the year the place was founded. Hitherto there had been a silver works at this site and several stamp mills, where ore won from the surrounding mines was processed. The artificial channel built to supply water to the works (from 1904 known as the Silberhütter Kunstgraben) is the longest in the Lower Harz Pond and Ditch System at 25.5 km. Ore was processed all year round in four smelting furnaces, two sulphur furnaces and a vitriol works. The smelter produced up to 1.6 t of silver and 870 t of lead annually.

A powder mill was opened in 1790 which supplied hunters as well as the surrounding Lower Harz mines. The mill was destroyed in 1898 by an explosion, but was immediately rebuilt. From 1893 it also took on the production of fireworks - the firm exists today as the Pyrotechnik Silberhütte (a subsidiary of Rheinmetall Waffe Munition). The factory carried out trials in 1928 with rocket-powered railway vehicles. In the first test the Eisfeld-Valier Rocket I by Max Valier attained a speed of 253 km/h - then a world record. However the vehicle leapt the rails in the third test and was completely destroyed.

The village church was built in 1932 and is made entirely of spruce wood.

== Places of interest ==
Besides the forest church with its rectangular bell tower, in which four bronze bells hang, Silberhütte is also home to the Unterharzer Waldhof, a recreation and exhibition complex about forestry. This is located on the terrain of the old wood mill - which in turn was built on the site of the old silver works. The Waldhof Festival (Waldhoffest) takes place every year with steam engine haulage. The Silberhütte Waldhof is No. 174 in the Harzer Wandernadel hiking network.

In the area around Silberhütte lies two of the ponds of the Lower Harz Pond and Ditch System - the Teufelsteich and the Fürstenteich.

== Transport ==
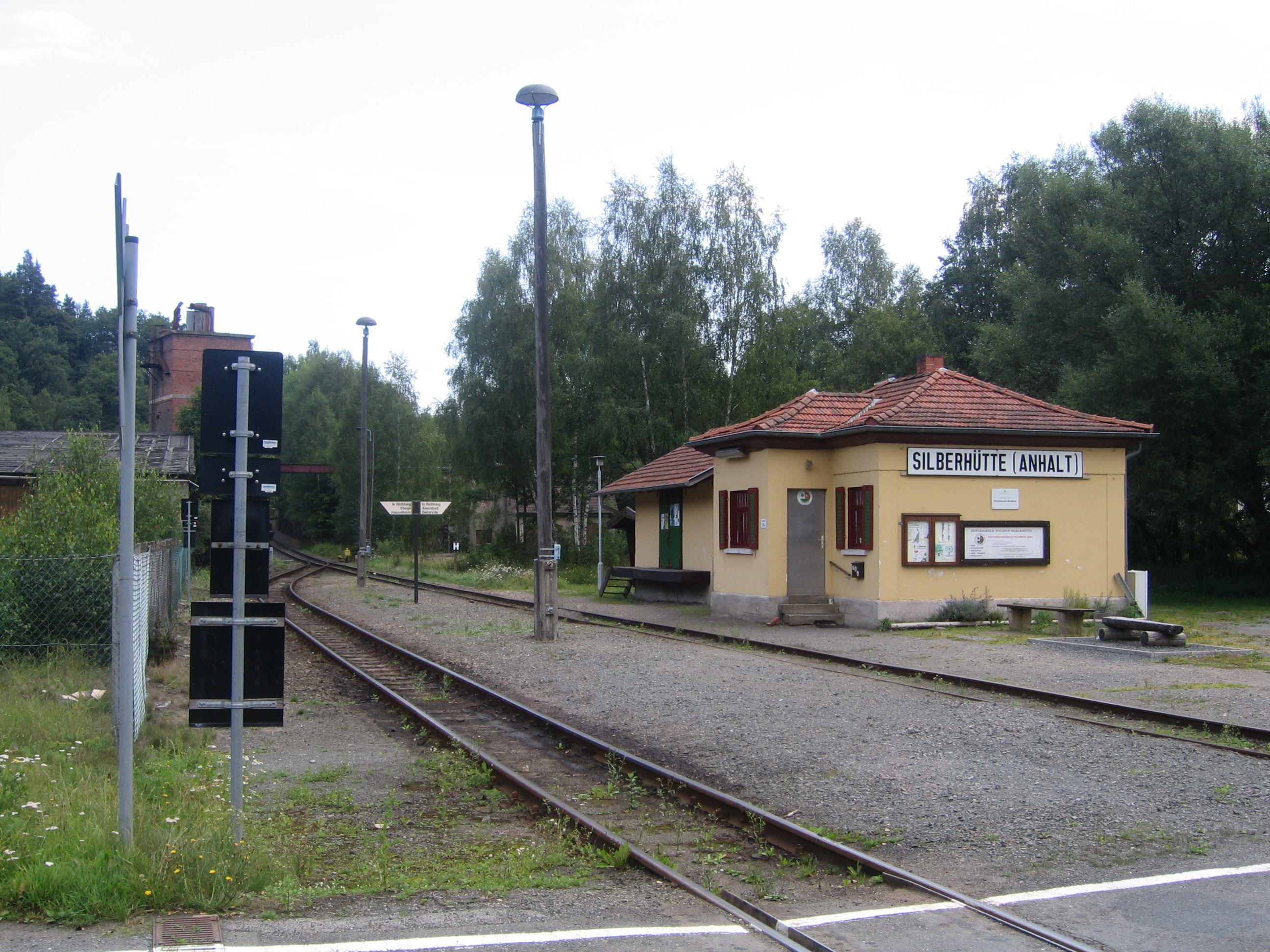
The railway station on the Selke Valley line

Silberhütte has a railway station on the Selke Valley Railway. From here there are many hiking trails to the old mining ponds nearby. The state road, the Landesstraße 234, runs through the village.

== Sources ==
- www.raymond-faure.com
- www.ausflugsziele-harz.de
- www.harzlife.de
