= Glasebach Pit =

Museum and former mine in Germany

Coordinates: 51°36′45″N 11°03′39″E

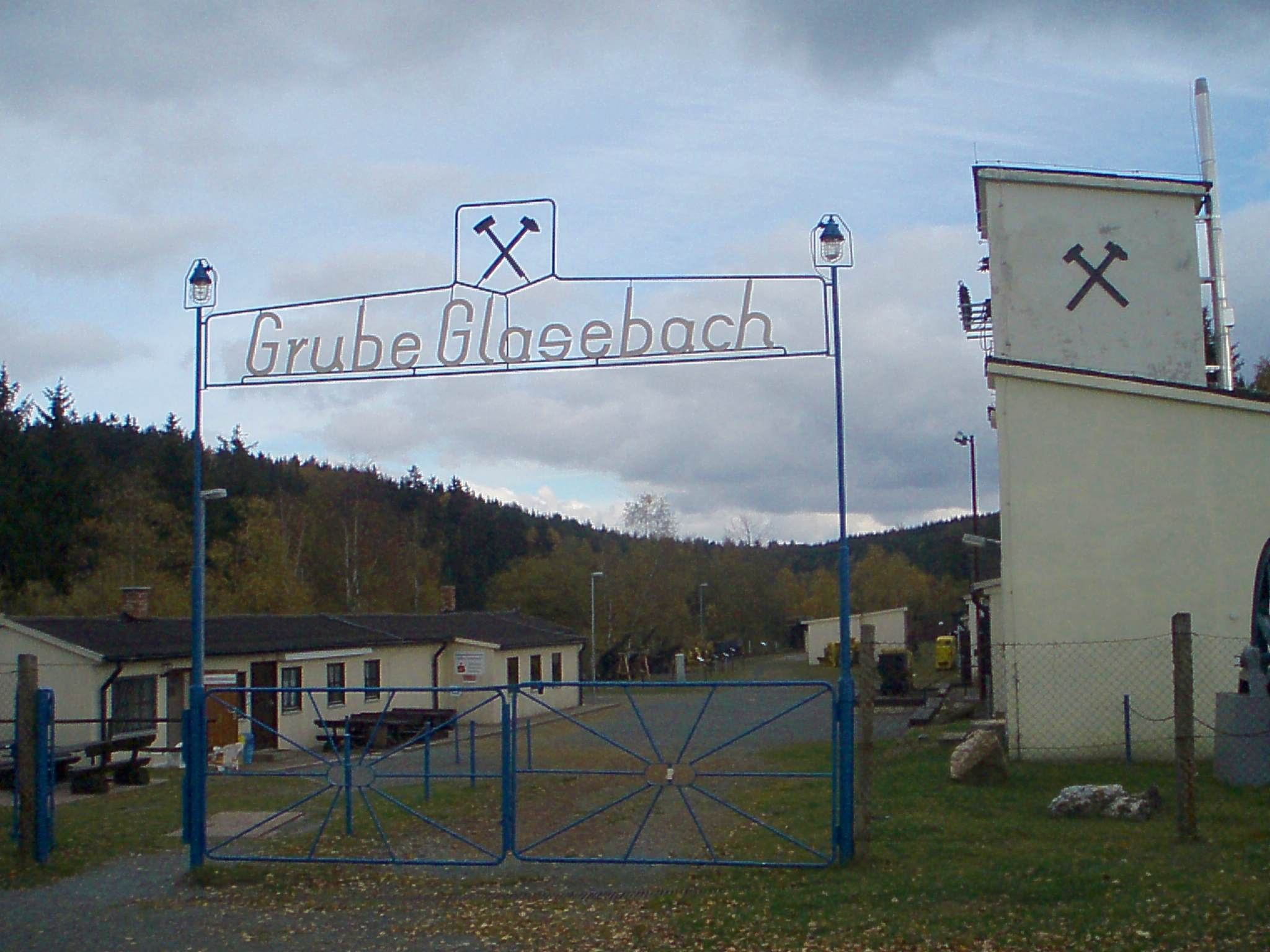
Entrance to the Glasebach Pit

The Glasebach Pit (German: Grube Glasebach) is a mining museum and former pit in the Harz fluorspar mining area near Straßberg in the German state of Saxony-Anhalt. It is run by the East Harz Mining Society (Montanverein Ostharz e. V.). The pit was founded under the name of Vertrau auf Gott ("Trust in God").

The mining industry in the area around Straßberg goes back to the time around the year 1400. At Heidelberg north of Straßberg, fluorite and silver were won and processed at a smeltery on the site on behalf of the counts of Stolberg. There was also flourishing mining activity on the Glasebach stream, which formed the boundary between the County of Stolberg and the Principality of Anhalt-Bernburg. After being abandoned for a while, mining restarted in the 18th century and continued, with interruptions, until the 1960s.

Various mining artefacts are displayed in the museum, including the old wooden drainage outlet (Grundablass) of the Lower Kilian Dam (one of the oldest dams in Germany), salvaged in 1990 during renovations, after it had undergone long-term conservation work by the Harzwasserwerken in Clausthal-Zellerfeld.

The show mine is checkpoint 175 in the Harzer Wandernadel hiking system.
