= Lude (stream) =

River in Germany

Location
- Country: Germany
- State: Saxony-Anhalt

Physical characteristics
- Source
  - location: 6 kilometres (4 mi) west of Breitenstein
  - coordinates: 51°37′27″N 10°58′47″E
- Mouth
  - location: in Stolberg into the Thyra
  - coordinates: 51°35′03″N 10°56′05″E

Basin features
- Progression: Thyra→ Helme→ Unstrut→ Saale→ Elbe→ North Sea
- Landmarks: Small towns: Stolberg
- Tributaries
  - right: Klippenwasser, Hellbach

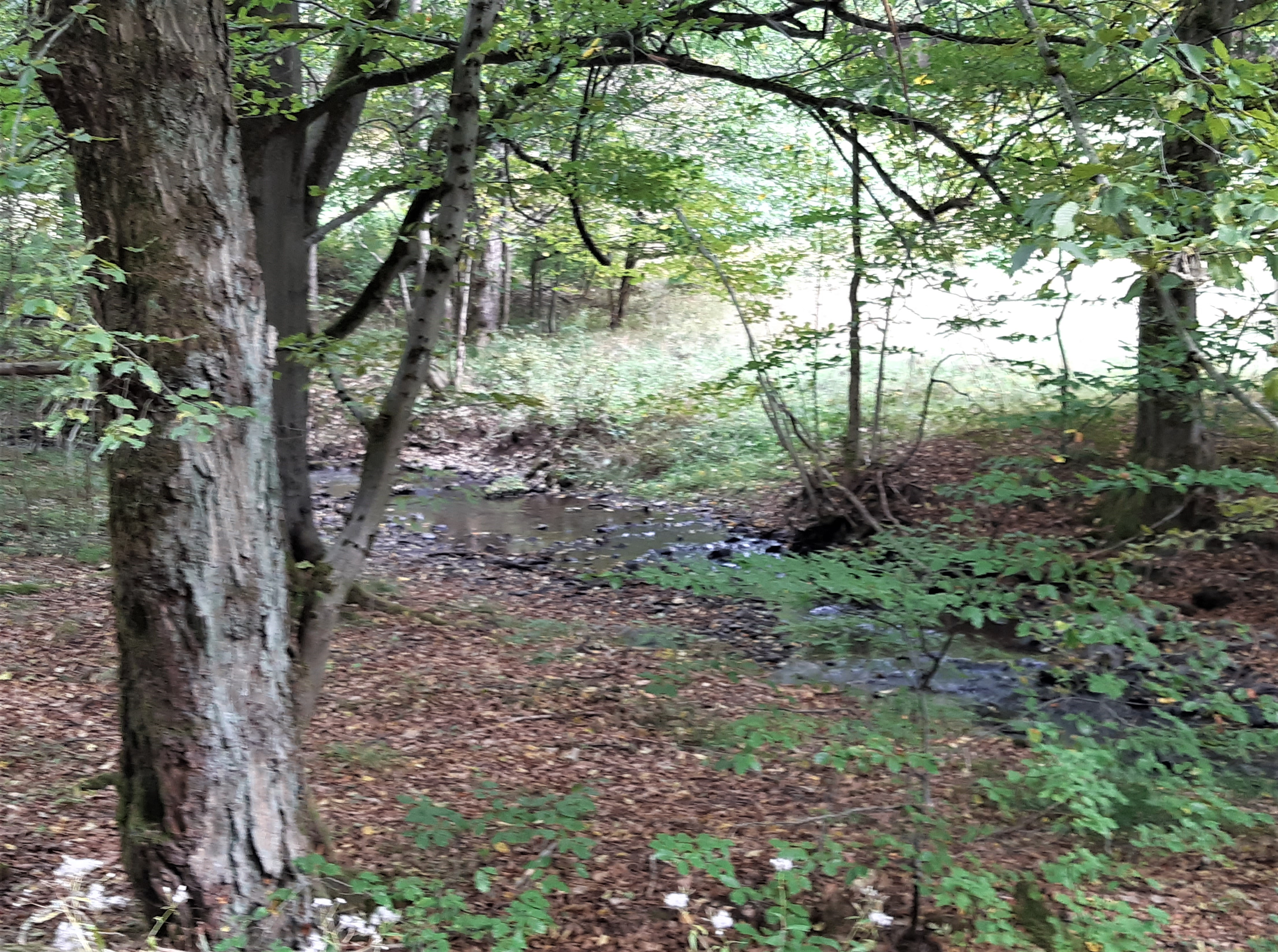
View of the Lude in Stolberg

The Lude is an 7.0-kilometre (4.3 mi) long stream of Saxony-Anhalt, in the Harz Mountains of central Germany. It is the strongest and – besides an affluent of itself – longest headwater of the Thyra and therefore hydrographically defined as its upper course.

== Course ==
The Lude rises northwest of Stolberg, about one kilometre west of Breitenstein. Only about 400 metres (1,300 ft) separates the southern source stream of the Katzsohlbach from the sources of the Lude and about 600 metres (2,000 ft) from the source of the Wahnborn. From 1745 to 1910 the Rieschengraben ditch channelled water from the Lude and Schmale Lude into the Lower Harz Pond and Ditch System, where the water of the Lude was impounded by the reservoir Möllerteich. At the foot of the Lindischberg (orographic right) and Kießlingskopf (orographic left) hills the Klippenwasser empties into the upper Lude. Only 500 metres (1,600 ft) downstream the Hellbach joins from the right. Just 500 metres further downstream the Lude has another, right-hand tributary. The stream is considerably longer than the Hellbach, has a significantly greater catchment area, its own tributaries and is impounded in its lower reaches. The name of this stream is not known.

The Thyra is formed by the confluence of the three mountain streams of the Lude, Kleine Wilde and Große Wilde (whose upper three thirds are called the Schmale Lude = "Narrow Lude") in the old town area of Stolberg. The Thyra then continues through Stolberg flowing in a southerly direction.

== See also ==
- List of rivers of Saxony-Anhalt
