= Straßberg, Saxony-Anhalt =

Straßberg
- Stadtteil of Harzgerode
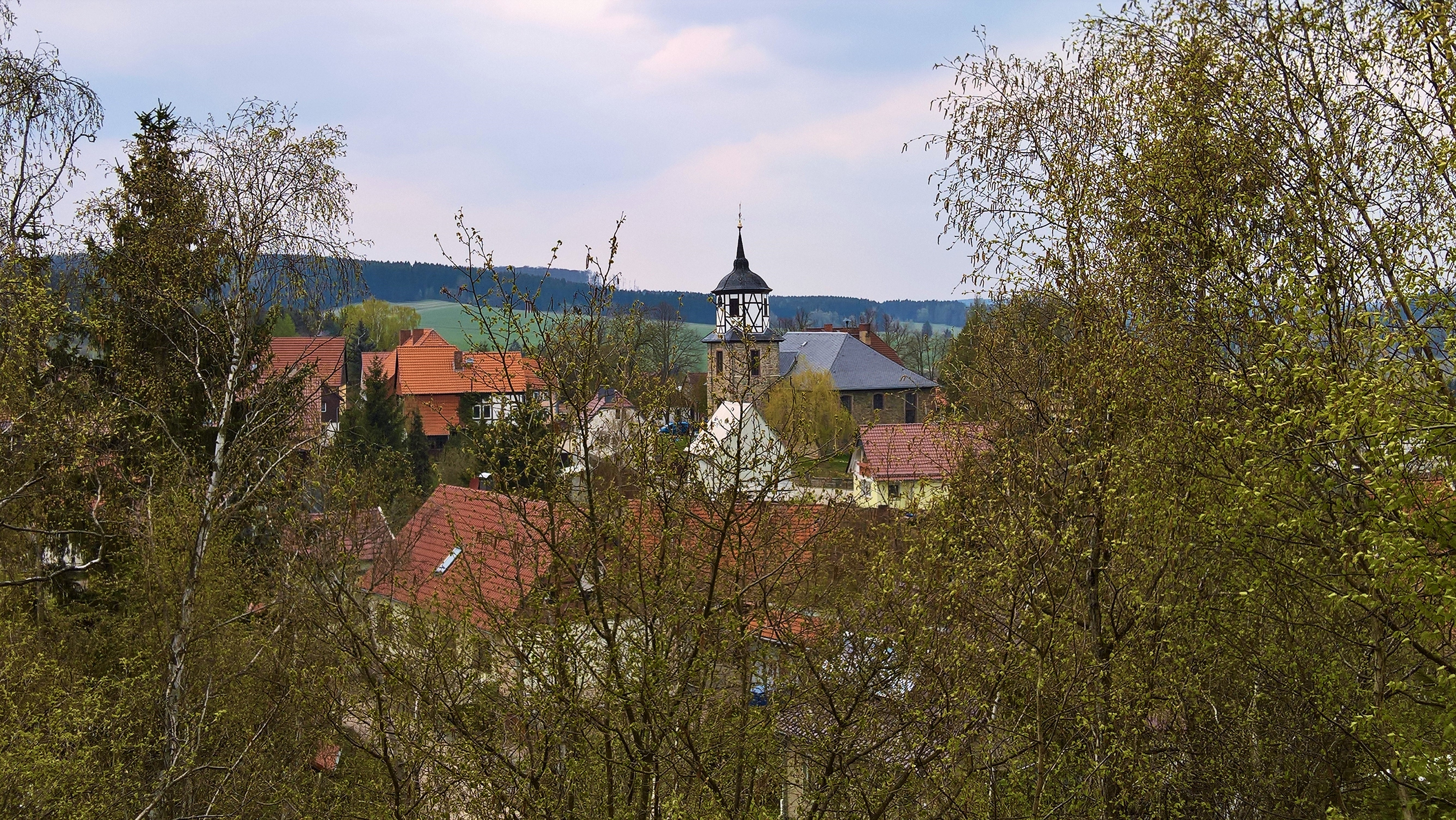

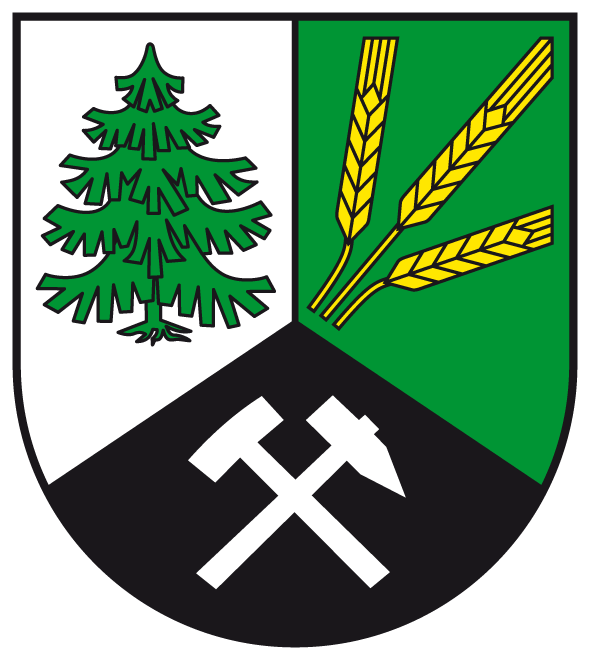
- Coat of arms
- Interactive map of Straßberg
- Location within Germany Location within Saxony-Anhalt
- Coordinates: 51°37′N 11°3′E
- Country: Germany
- State: Saxony-Anhalt
- District: Harz
- Town: Harzgerode

Area
  - Total: 13.78 km^{2} (5.32 sq mi)
- Elevation: 399 m (1,309 ft)

Population (2011)
  - Total: 680
  - Density: 49/km^{2} (130/sq mi)
- Time zone: UTC+01:00 (CET)
  - Summer (DST): UTC+02:00 (CEST)
- Postal codes: 06493
- Dialling codes: 039489
- Vehicle registration: HZ

Straßberg (German pronunciation: [ˈʃtʁaːsbɛʁk]) is a village and a former municipality in the district of Harz, Saxony-Anhalt, Germany. Since 1 August 2009, it is part of the town Harzgerode. Straßberg is located in southeastern part of the Harz mountains, 20 km south of Quedlinburg, 22 km northeast of Nordhausen and 23 km northwest of Sangerhausen.

== History ==
Straßberg was mentioned for the first time in the chronicle for the district of Sangerhausen in 1194 as Strazberc.

From 1400, mining became the main livelihood for the villagers of Straßberg. Today, they preserve its mining history and look after their history and conserve the village for those seeking relaxation the past. Even agriculture flourishes despite the rather difficult natural environment.

On 1 August 2009, the municipality of Straßberg agreed with the towns of Güntersberge and Harzgerode as well as the villages of Dankerode, Königerode, Schielo and Siptenfelde to be incorporated into the new borough of Harzgerode.

== Culture and places of interest ==
=== Museums ===
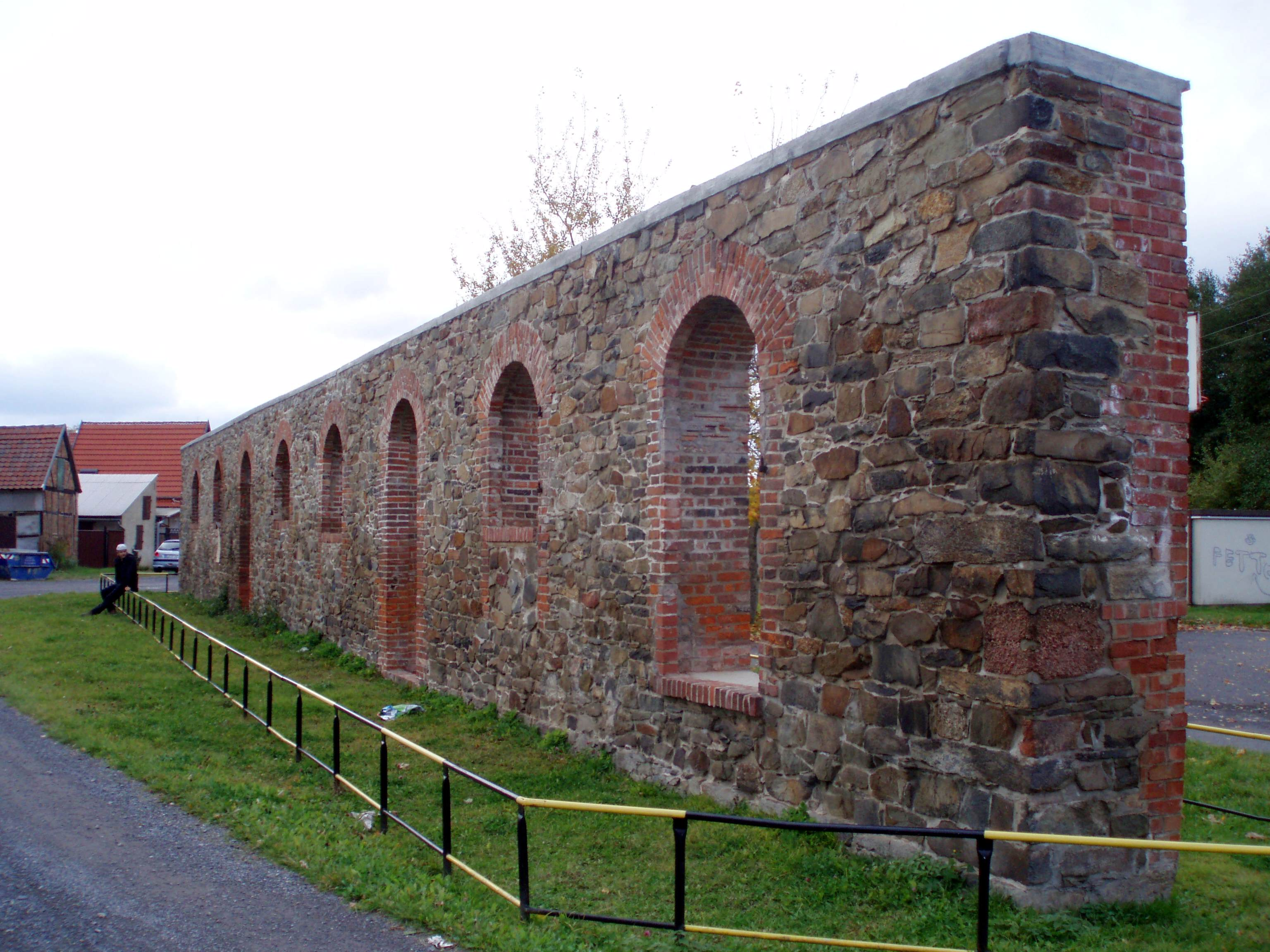
Remains of the smeltery in Straßberg

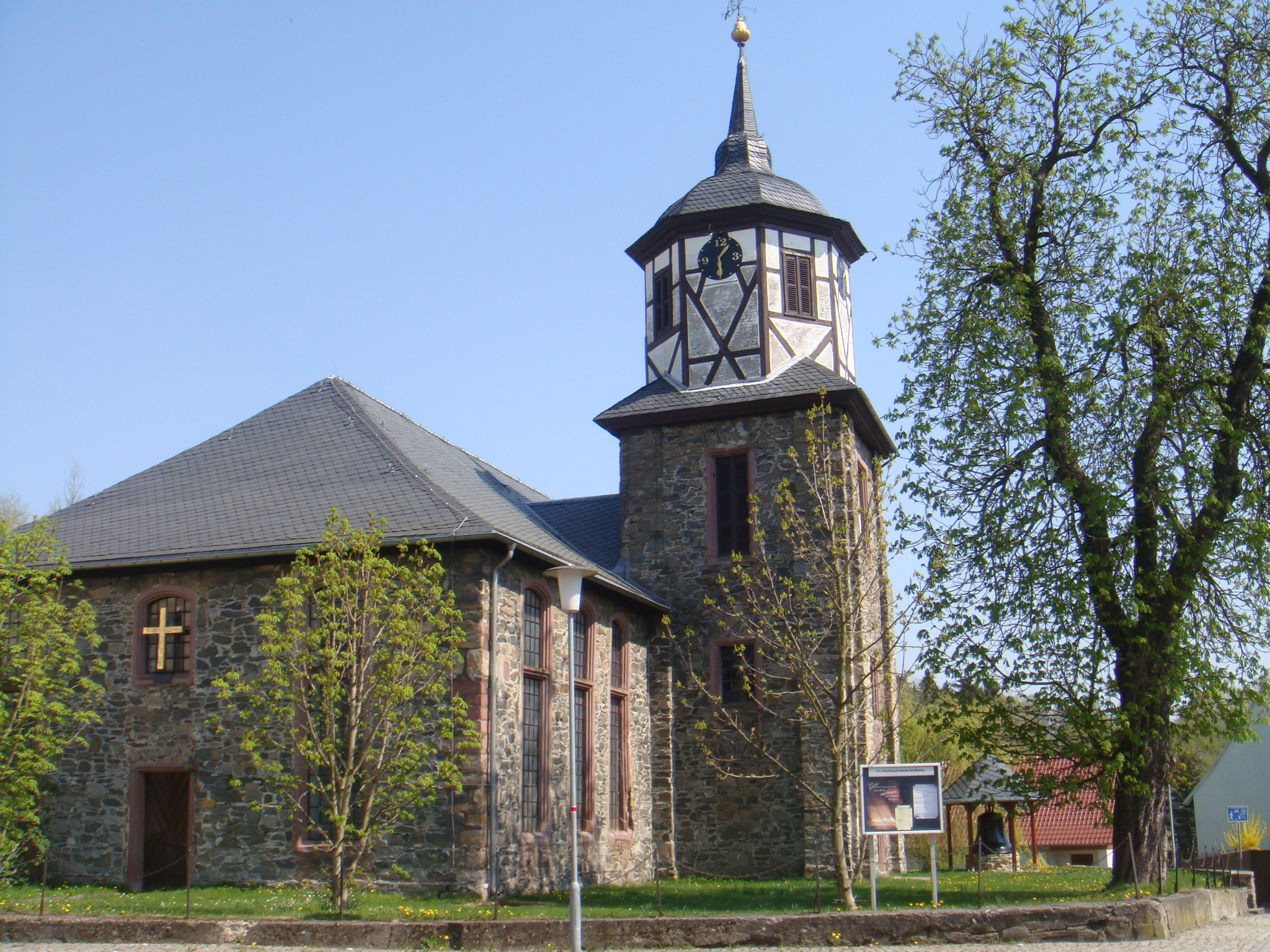
Straßberg's evangelical church

Straßberg bears witness today to the historic silver and fluorspar mines, old shafts, sinkholes (Pingen) and technical facilities:

- Glasebach Pit Mining Museum (Grube Glasebach Bergwerksmuseum)

=== Buildings ===
- The village church was built in the first third of the 18th century to plans by the Stolberg master builder, Johann Friedrich Penther. Inside is a splendid pulpit altar (Kanzelaltar).
- Below the village at the confluence of the Glasebach and the Selke is the Bärloch Mill (Bärlochsmühle).
- Rinke Mill (Rinkemühle)
