= Unterharz =

Defunct administrative district in Germany

Coordinates: 51°39′N 11°09′E

Unterharz is a former Verwaltungsgemeinschaft ("collective municipality") in the district of Harz, in Saxony-Anhalt, Germany. It was situated in the eastern part of the Harz, south of Quedlinburg. The seat of the Verwaltungsgemeinschaft was in Harzgerode. It was disbanded on 1 August 2009.

== Municipalities ==
The Verwaltungsgemeinschaft Unterharz consisted of the following municipalities:

1. Dankerode
2. Güntersberge
3. Harzgerode
4. Königerode
5. Neudorf
6. Schielo
7. Siptenfelde
8. Straßberg
