= Heinrichsberg Castle =

Coordinates: 51°40′31″N 11°07′56″E

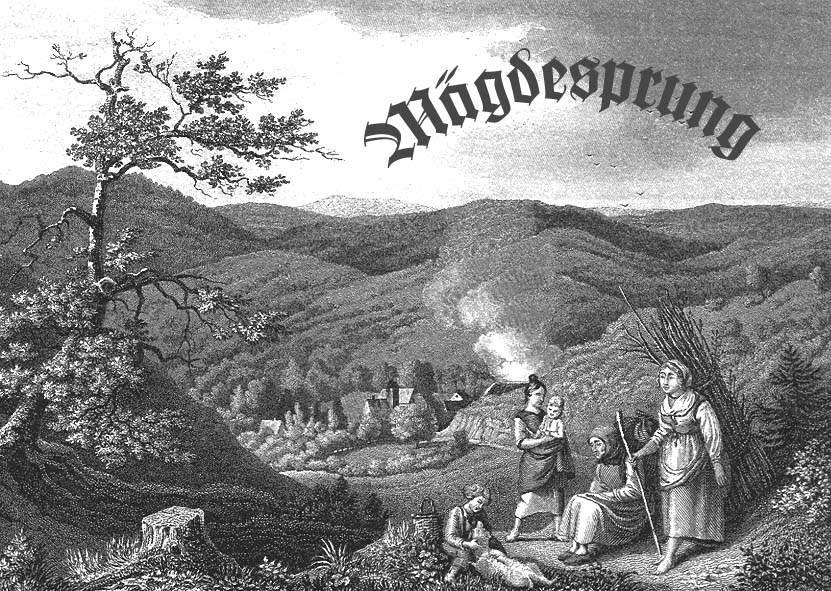
Mägdesprung near Heinrichsberg Castle, around 1840

Heinrichsberg Castle (German: Burg Heinrichsberg) is a ruin north of Mägdesprung in the borough of Harzgerode in central Germany. It is not far from the B 185 federal road in the district of Harz in the state of Saxony-Anhalt.

== History ==
It is supposed to have been built to guard the nearby smelting works by the Count and later Prince of Anhalt, whose family seat was located only about 3 km away in the Selke valley. From 1307 the counts of Stolberg were described as the Anhalt vassals of the Heinrichberg castle. The original protective function of the castle changed, however, under the Stolberg's occupation, for the fortress situated at the northeastern periphery of the comital estates was later used as a base for highwaymen on the Harz Road that ran past it. According to Cyriac Spangenberg's Mansfeld Chronicle, the castle was recaptured by the counts, Dietrich and Henry of Hohnstein, and their sons in 1344, and the highwaymen living there were executed.

The Anhalt letter of enfeoffment (Lehnsbrief) for Heinrichsberg to the counts of Stolberg was renewed in 1377 and 1381. Thereafter, for decades, there was no written evidence of the castle, which became increasingly dilapidated and, by 1491 was referred to as an abandoned castle, that was a pledge held by the Frederick of Hoym. At that time the lords of Hoym also held the Anhalt fiefs of Bärenrode, Bolkendorf and half of the village of Dankerode. They pledged these estates to the counts of Stolberg, Prince Bernard VI of Anhalt-Bernburg giving his consent as overlord in 1452. In 1461 Henry, Count of Stolberg, paid a sum of 450 gold Rhenish guilders to Frederick the Elder, Frederick the Younger and Henry of Hoym for the purchase of two abandoned villages, Olvesfelde and Mußeberg, and half of the village of Dankerode.

In 1514 the princes, Ernest and Wolfgang of Anhalt, renewed the enfeoffment of Stolberg and Heinrichsberg Castle together with its estates, the village of Breitenstein, the then already deserted village of Ammacht, the copse near Gräfen Pond (Gräfenteich), a field near Güntersberge and the field at Lingesbach, half the village of Dankerode and other rights. In the said letter of enfeoffment, the Stolberg claim to several estates in the Harz, in particular three abandoned settlements between Güntersberge and Harzgerode, whose vassals were the lords of Hoym at that time, are recorded and documented. Count Botho, however, was engaged in negotiations over their purchase with Lord (Ritter) Magnus of Hoym. The Stolberg prince had become financially strong enough to create a link between the towns of Güntersberge and Harzgerode, already in his possession by acquiring land, thereby extending Stolberg's sphere of influence in the northeast. Magnus of Hoym but died before the conclusion of the contract. He left his infant son, Frederick of Hoym, whose guardian concluded the inheritance agreement with Botho, Count of Stolberg in 1518. The purchase price for these fiefs that had belonged to the Hoym family since 1430 was 1550 guilders. After reaching the age of majority, Frederick of Hoym ratified the inheritance purchase in 1530 but raised the price of 900 gold guilders, because he said that the estates had been sold below their true value.

The late-medieval deserted village of Bärenrode was made habitable again by the counts of Stolberg in the 16th century and the outwork there was turned into the administrative seat for an Amt. The castles of Erichsberg and Heinrichsberg, just a few kilometres away, which had fallen into insignificance as a result of their increasing decline, were now managed by the Amt of Bärenrode. Of the estates of the two castles, only the village of Breitenstein, which had originally belonged to Heinrichsberg Castle, and its extensive areas of forest subsequently had any great importance.
