= Herbert Ziegenhahn =

German politician (1921–1993)

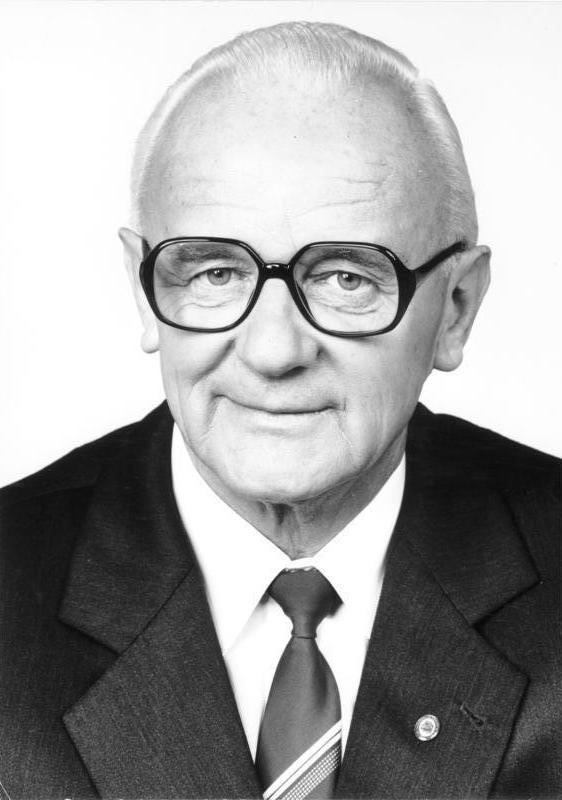
- Ziegenhahn in 1984

First Secretary of the Socialist Unity Party in Bezirk Gera
- In office 14 February 1963 – 2 November 1989
- Second Secretary: Rainer Knolle; Dieter Ukenings
- Preceded by: Paul Roscher
- Succeeded by: Erich Postler
Volkskammer
Member of the Volkskammer for Gera-Stadt, Gera-Land, Eisenberg, Stadtroda (Saalfeld, Pößneck, Rudolstadt, Stadtroda, Eisenberg; 1963–1971)
In office 14 November 1963 – 16 November 1989
Preceded by	multi-member district
Succeeded by	Rainer Schwabe

Personal details
- Born: Herbert Ziegenhahn; 27 October 1921 Dankerode, Free State of Anhalt, Weimar Republic (now Saxony-Anhalt, Germany)
- Died: 29 June 1993 (aged 71)
- Party: Socialist Unity Party (1951–1989)
- Education: "Karl Marx" Party Academy
- Occupation: Politician; Party Functionary; Farmer
- Awards: Patriotic Order of Merit, 1st class; Order of Karl Marx; Banner of Labor
- Central institution membership: 1966–1989: Full member, Central Committee; 1963–1966: Candidate member, Central Committee; Other offices held: 1959–1963: First Secretary, Socialist Unity Party in Dessau; 1952–1959: First Secretary, Socialist Unity Party in Quedlinburg; 1951–1952: Mayor, Harzgerode; 1950–1951: Mayor, Dankerode

Herbert Ziegenhahn (27 October 1921 – 29 June 1993) was a German politician and party functionary of the Socialist Unity Party (SED).

In the German Democratic Republic, he served as the longtime First Secretary of the SED in Bezirk Gera and was a member of the Central Committee of the SED.

== Life and career ==
=== Early career ===
Herbert Ziegenhahn was born on 27 October 1921, as the son of a small farming family in Dankerode. After completing elementary school, he attended an agricultural vocational school and worked from 1936 to 1941 as a farm laborer, mason, and in his parents' business.

As a soldier in the Wehrmacht, he served as a gunner and in a sound-ranging company. Ziegenhahn was captured by the Soviets during the war and returned to Germany in 1949 after attending Antifa schools.

In 1950, he became a municipal representative and in 1951, the mayor of his hometown Dankerode, and shortly thereafter of Harzgerode. In 1951, he joined the ruling Socialist Unity Party (SED).

In 1952, the party appointed him as the First Secretary of the SED in Quedlinburg, a position he held until 1959. Simultaneously, the SED delegated him to a distance-learning program at the "Karl Marx" Party Academy from 1954 to 1960, which he completed with a degree in social sciences.

From 1959 to 1963, Ziegenhahn served as the First Secretary of the SED in Dessau.

=== Bezirk Gera SED First Secretary ===
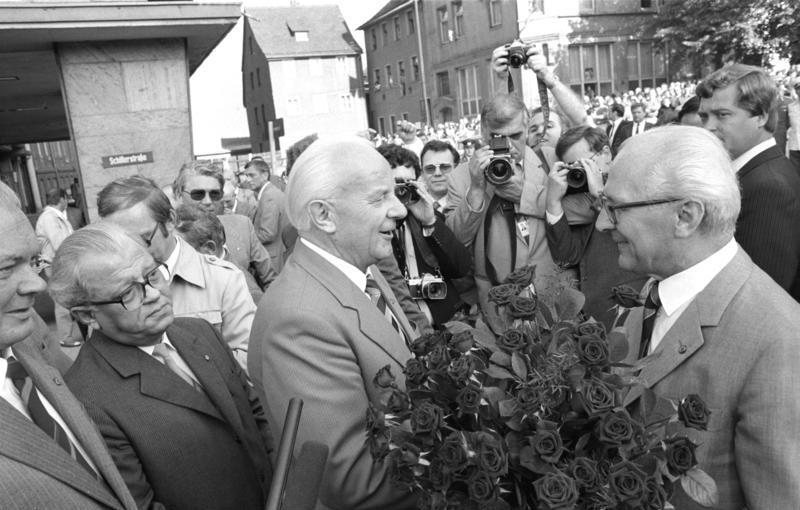
Ziegenhahn (center) greeting Erich Honecker (right) on a visit to Jena in May 1986

In January 1963 (VI. Party Congress), Ziegenhahn was elected as a candidate member of the Central Committee of the SED and succeeded Paul Roscher as First Secretary of the Bezirk Gera SED on 14 February. Roscher was promoted to First Secretary of the SED in the much larger Bezirk Karl-Marx-Stadt.

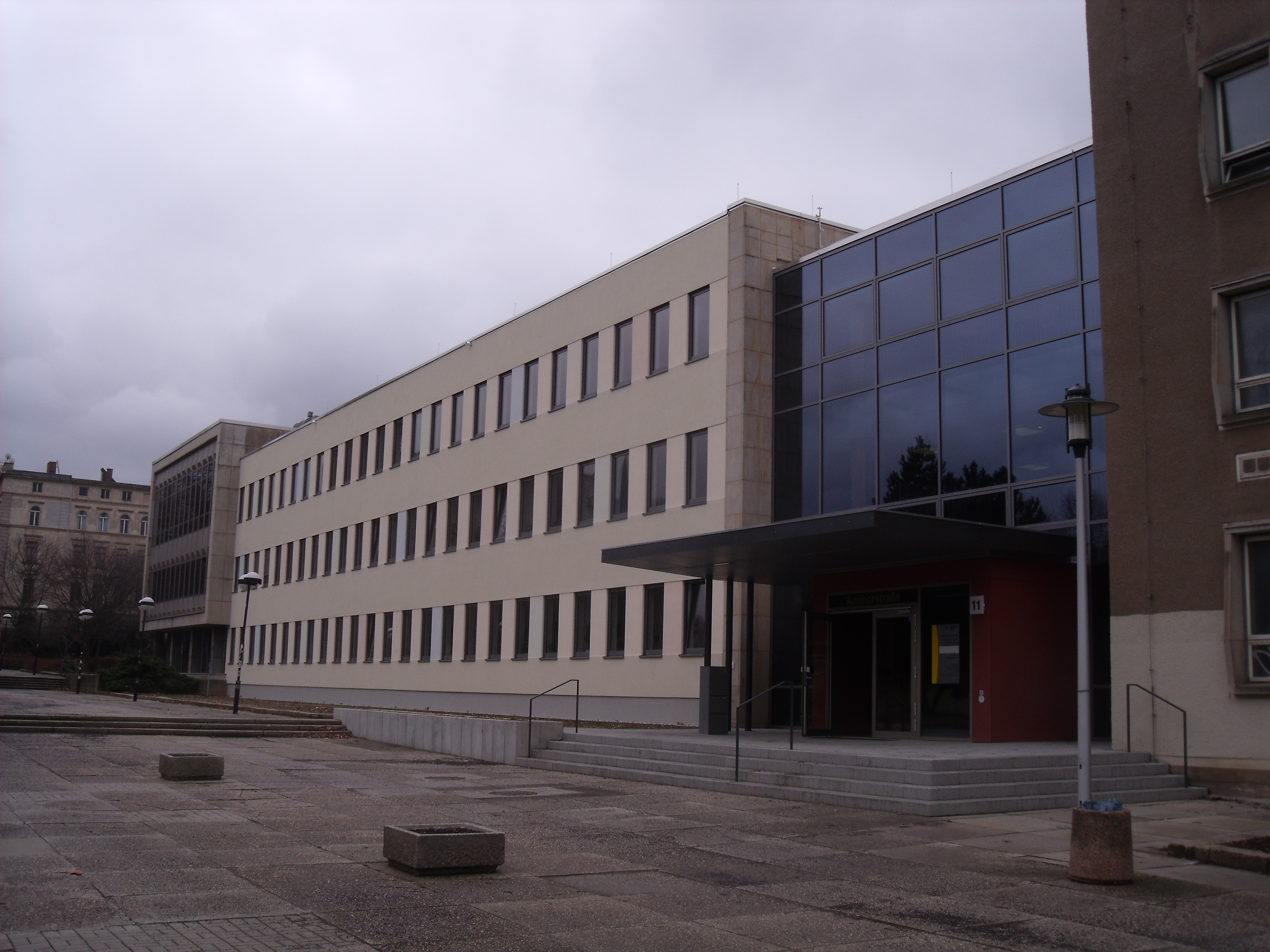
Former Bezirk Gera SED building in March 2012

Additionally, later in 1963, he was given a mandate by his party as a representative of the Volkskammer, nominally representing a constituency in the northeast of his Bezirk. In September 1966, Ziegenhahn became a full member of the Central Committee of the SED.

He held all these positions until the political change in the GDR in the fall of 1989.

Ziegenhahn's tenure was viewed negatively, him being seen as a model student of the SED headquarters and him becoming increasingly intolerant of criticism from subordinates.

Ziegenhahn was awarded the Patriotic Order of Merit in silver, in Gold in 1971, the Order of Karl Marx in 1981 and the Banner of Labor in 1984.

=== Peaceful Revolution ===
During the Wende, on 2 November 1989, the Bezirk Gera SED removed him from the position of First Secretary and installed reformer Erich Postler as his successor. He was removed by his party from the Volkskammer two weeks later, on 16 November 1989.

At its last session on 3 December 1989, the Central Committee expelled Ziegenhahn from the Central Committee and from the SED shortly before its collective resignation "due to the severity of their violations against the SED statute and in consideration of numerous demands and requests from district delegate conferences."

Ziegenhahn faced an arrest warrant in January 1990, an investigation being underway against him for breach of trust. He was however released from pre-trial detention on 13 February due to his poor health.

=== Reunified Germany ===
Ziegenhahn died in 1993 at the age of 71.

Ziegenhahn's son, Herbert Ziegenhahn Jr., was an unsuccessful candidate for the WASG in the 2006 Gera mayoral election and was a member of the WASG state executive committee.
