= Bundesstraße 242 =

Federal highway in Germany

B 242
- Bundesstraße 242

Route information
- Length: 124 km (77 mi)

Major junctions
- East end: Seesen
- West end: Mansfeld

Location
- Country: Germany
- States: Lower Saxony, Saxony-Anhalt

Highway system
- Roads in Germany; Autobahns; List; Federal; List; State; E-roads

The B 242 is a federal highway (German: Bundesstraße) in Germany. It runs from Seesen to Mansfeld.

== Route ==
The B 242, also known as the Harz High Road (Harzhochstraße), runs right across the Harz mountains in central Germany. From Seesen on the northwestern edge of the Harz near the A 7 motorway it runs through the Upper Harz past Clausthal-Zellerfeld, the High Harz, where it is combined for several kilometres with the B 4, past Braunlage and then through the eastern Harz foothills into Mansfelder Land. There it joins the B 180 east of Klostermansfeld.

An extension of the B 242 via Polleben and Salzmünde to Halle (Saale) is being planned.

== Junction lists ==
	Seesen B 248
	Herrhausen
	Münchehof
Motor road	Kraftfahrstraße
	Münchehof B 243
	common route with the B 243
	Münchehof-Süd B 243
End of the motor road	end of motor road
Diversion	Bad Grund local diversion Harz unincorporated area
	Clausthal-Zellerfeld B 241 B 498
	common route with the B 498
	Dammhaus B 498
	Sonnenberg B 4
	common route with the B 4
	Braunlage-Nord
Motor road	Kraftfahrstraße
	parking area
	Braunlage-Mitte B 27 Hasselkopf Tunnel (220 m)
End of the motor road	end of motor road
	Braunlage-Süd B 4
	Sorge
	Trans-Harz Railway
	Tanne
	Trautenstein
	Hasselfelde B 81
	Stiege
	Selke Valley Railway
	Güntersberge
	Siptenfelde
	Alexisbad B 185
	Harzgerode
	Königerode
	Leimbach B 86
	Mansfeld Castle
	Klostermansfeld B 180

=== Rivers crossed ===
- Innerste
- Oderteich
- Warme Bode, near Sorge
- Hassel between Hasselfelde and Stiege
- Selke near Alexisbad
- Wipper in Mansfeld

== Photographs ==
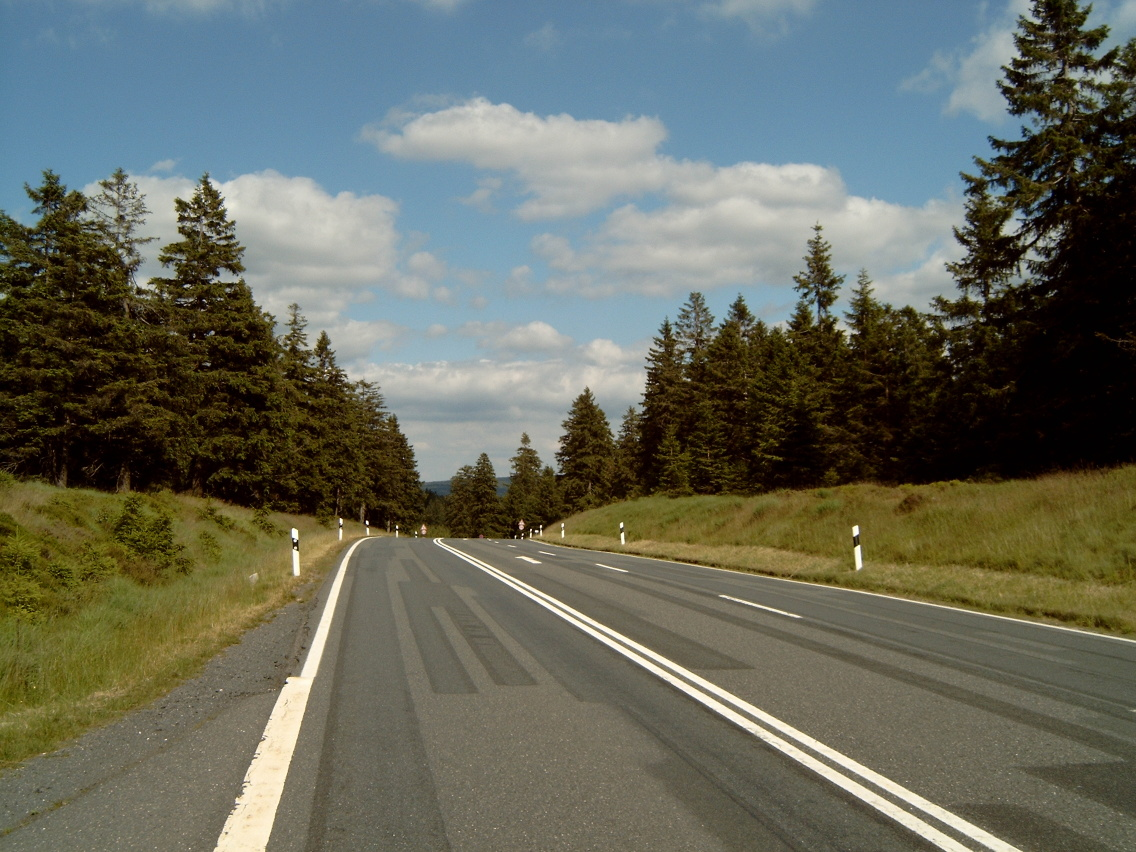
The highest point on the B 242 (828 m AMSL) between Dammhaus and Sonnenberg

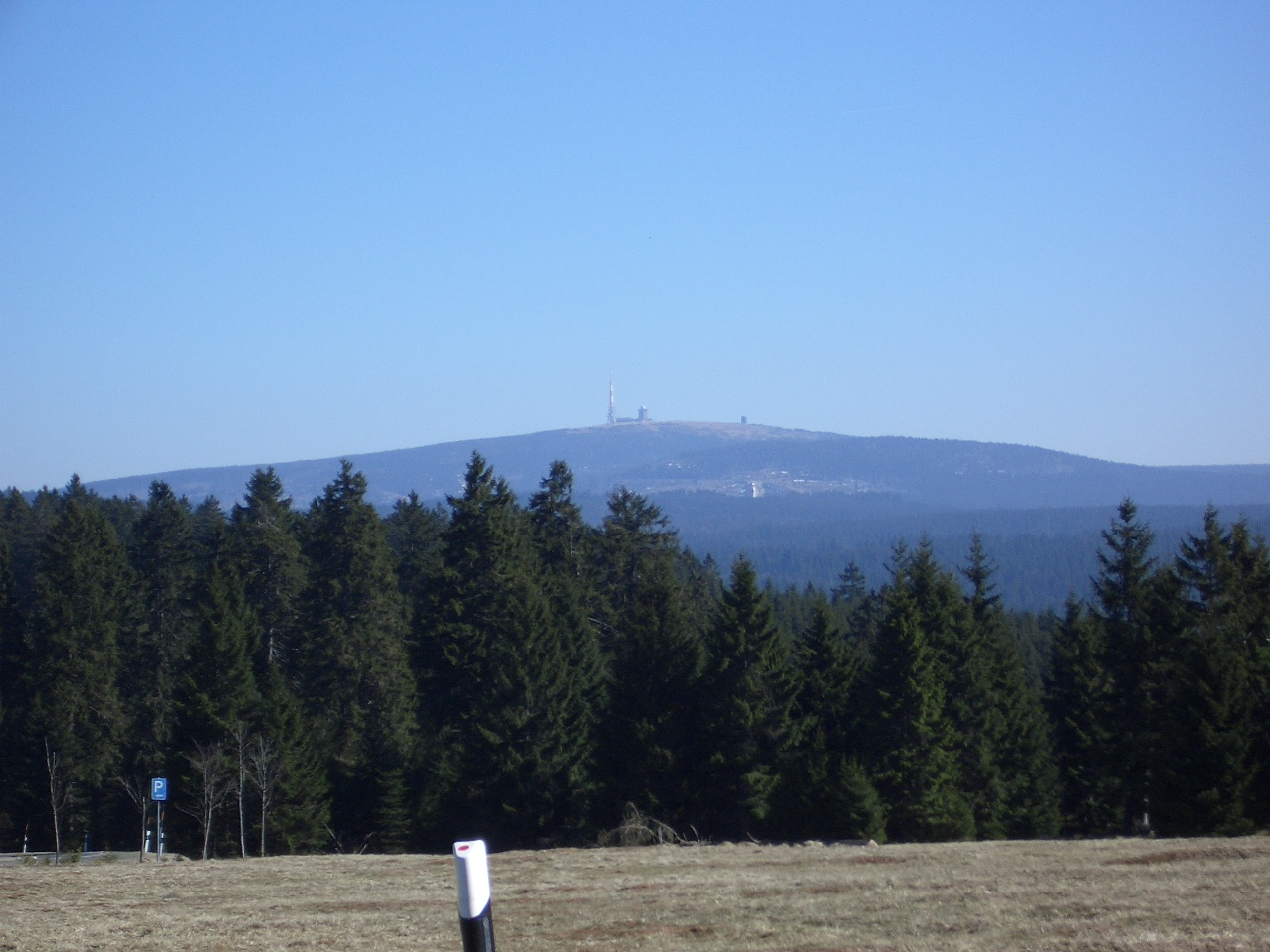
View from the Harz highway of the Brocken

== See also ==
- List of federal roads in Germany
