= Selke Valley Trail =

Footpath in the Harz mountains of Germany

The Selke Valley Trail (German: Selketalstieg) is a 67 km long footpath in the Harz mountains of Germany. It begins at the Selke Valley Railway station in Stiege and follows the River Selke in places. Along the route lie the villages of Güntersberge, Straßberg, Silberhütte, Alexisbad, Mägdesprung, Meisdorf, Ballenstedt, Gernrode, Bad Suderode and Quarmbeck. The end of the Selketalstieg is in Carl-Ritter-Straße in Quedlinburg. In 2006 the footpath was established by the Harz Tourist Association (Harzer Verkehrsverband).
