= Rudolf Trenkel =

German World War II fighter pilot (1918–2001)

- Born: 17 January 1918; Neudorf
- Died: 26 April 2001 (aged 83); Vienna, Austria
- Military career
- Allegiance: Nazi Germany
- Branch: Luftwaffe
- Service years: 1936–1945
- Rank: Hauptmann (captain)
- Commands: 2./JG 52
- Conflicts: World War II
- Awards: Knight's Cross of the Iron Cross

Rudolf Trenkel (17 January 1918 – 26 April 2001) was a German Luftwaffe military aviator during World War II. As a flying ace, he was credited with 138 victories and was a recipient of Knight's Cross of the Iron Cross of Nazi Germany.

== Career ==
Trenkel was born on 17 January 1918 in Neudorf in the Province of Saxony within the German Empire. He volunteered for military service in the Wehrmacht of Nazi Germany in 1936. Initially serving in the Army, Trenkel transferred to the Luftwaffe (air force) in 1939 as an Unteroffizier (non-commissioned officer).

Following flight and fighter pilot training, (Note: Flight training in the Luftwaffe progressed through the levels A1, A2 and B1, B2, referred to as A/B flight training. A training included theoretical and practical training in aerobatics, navigation, long-distance flights and dead-stick landings. The B courses included high-altitude flights, instrument flights, night landings and training to handle the aircraft in difficult situations.) Trenkel was posted to 7. Staffel (7th squadron) of Jagdgeschwader 77 (JG 77—77th Fighter Wing) in February 1942. On 1 May, he was transferred to the Geschwaderstab (headquarters unit) of Jagdgeschwader 52 (JG 52—52nd Fighter Wing).

=== World War II ===
On Friday 1 September 1939 German forces had invaded Poland which marked the beginning of World War II, and in June 1941, Germany had invaded the Soviet Union which created the Eastern Front. When in early May 1942 Trenkel joined the Geschwaderstab of JG 52, the unit was based at Pilsen, present-day Plzeň in the Czech Republic, where it received new Messerschmitt Bf 109 F-4 aircraft. In preparation for Operation Fredericus, also known as the second Battle of Kharkov, JG 52 moved to the airfield named Kharkov-Waitschenko on 10 May and to Barvinkove on 19 May. Here, Trenkel claimed his first two aerial victories with the Geschwaderstab, a Mikoyan-Gurevich MiG-1 on 2 June and a Yakovlev Yak-1 on 22 June. He had claimed his first aerial victory while flying with JG 77.

I./JG 52 insignia

In late June, Trenkel was transferred to 2. Staffel of JG 52. The Staffel had just been placed under the command of Hauptmann Johannes Wiese and was subordinated to I. Gruppe (1st group) of JG 52 headed by Hauptmann Helmut Bennemann. The Gruppe was based at Bilyi Kolodyaz, approximately 10 kilometers (6.2 miles) southeast of Vovchansk, and was fighting in support of Case Blue, the strategic summer offensive in southern Russia with the objective to capture the oil fields of Baku, Grozny and Maykop. While based at Bilyi Kolodyaz, Trenkel claimed two aerial victories, including a MiG-1 fighter on 1 July.

On 3 July, the Gruppe moved to a forward airfield near the village Novy Grinev located approximately 30 kilometers (19 miles) south-southwest from Novy Oskol and to Artyomovsk on 9 July. Here on 12 July, Trenkel claimed a Lavochkin-Gorbunov-Gudkov LaGG-3 shot down. To support German forces fighting in the Battle of the Caucasus, I. Gruppe relocated to an airfield at Kerch, in the east of Crimea, on 2 August. At the time, the Gruppe was moved around as a kind of fire brigade, deployed in areas where the Soviet Air Forces was particular active. The Gruppe then moved to Oryol on 15 August. On 6 December, the Gruppe moved to an airfield at Rossosh. Here on 17 December Trenkel became an "ace-in-a-day" for the first time when he claimed six Ilyushin Il-2 ground-attack aircraft shot down.

On 28 January 1943, Trenkel was awarded the Honor Goblet of the Luftwaffe (Ehrenpokal der Luftwaffe). (Note: According to Obermaier on 11 December 1942.) Following the German defeat at Stalingrad and Soviet advance in Voronezh–Kharkov offensive, I. Gruppe was moved to Anapa located on the northern coast of the Black Sea near the Sea of Azov on 16 May. While Trenkel reached Anapa on 24 May. Following 75 aerial victories claimed with JG 52, he was awarded the Knight's Cross of the Iron Cross (Ritterkreuz des Eisernen Kreuzes) on 19 August 1943. On 1 November, Trenkel made a forced landing in his Bf 109 G-6 (Werknummer 140167—factory number) 6 kilometers (3.7 miles) north of Dzhankoi following combat with Ilyushin Il-2 ground attack and Yakovlev Yak-9 fighter aircraft. In 1944, he was forced to bail out five times within ten days. On 14 July 1944, Trenkel was credited with his 100th aerial victory. He was the 83rd Luftwaffe pilot to achieve the century mark.

=== Squadron leader ===
On 15 August 1944, Trenkel was appointed Staffelkapitän (squadron leader) of the recreated 2. Staffel of JG 52. The original 2. Staffel under the command of Oberleutnant Paul-Heinrich Dähne had been withdrawn from the Eastern Front and transferred west to fight in Defense of the Reich in early June 1944. There the Staffel was subordinated to III. Gruppe of Jagdgeschwader 11 (JG 11—11th Fighter Wing) and later became the 12. Staffel of JG 11. Trenkel formed the new 2. Staffel of JG 52 at Kraków from 15 to 26 August.

On 16 October 1944, JG 52 lost six aircraft in combat with the French Armée de l'Air Normandie-Niemen fighter regiment serving on the Eastern Front. One of the pilots shot down was Trenkel who survived by bailing out.

On 19 April, I. Gruppe moved to an airfield located approximately 4 kilometers (2.5 miles) southwest of Deutsch-Brod, now Havlíčkův Brod. Trenkel and other soldiers of JG 52 surrendered to the 90th US Infantry Division near Písek on 8 May 1945 and became a prisoner of war (POW). The soldiers were initially interned at a POW camp at Strakonice where on 14 May, Trenkel married his fiancé Ida Sehnal who was among the civilian refuges. The wedding ceremony was held by Oberst Hermann Graf. The witnesses to the wedding were Major Adolf Borchers and Hauptmann Erich Hartmann. On 15 May, Trenkel and most of the JG 52 personnel were handed over by the American forces to the Soviet Union.

== Later life ==
Trenkel died on 26 April 2001 at the age of 83 in Vienna, Austria.

== Summary of career ==
=== Aerial victory claims ===
According to US historian David T. Zabecki, Trenkel was credited with 138 aerial victories. Spick also lists Trenkel with 138 aerial victories claimed in over 500 combat missions, all but one on the Eastern Front, and a mission-to-claim ratio of 3.62. Mathews and Foreman, authors of Luftwaffe Aces — Biographies and Victory Claims, researched the German Federal Archives and found records for 138 aerial victory claims, plus three further unconfirmed claims. This figure includes 131 aerial victories on the Eastern Front and one Western Allies four-engined bomber.

Victory claims were logged to a map-reference (PQ = Planquadrat), for example "PQ 59191". The Luftwaffe grid map (Jägermeldenetz) covered all of Europe, western Russia and North Africa and was composed of rectangles measuring 15 minutes of latitude by 30 minutes of longitude, an area of about 360 square miles (930 km^{2}). These sectors were then subdivided into 36 smaller units to give a location area 3 km × 4 km (1.9 mi × 2.5 mi) in size.

Chronicle of aerial victories
This and the ♠ (Ace of spades) indicates those aerial victories which made Trenkel an "ace-in-a-day", a term which designates a fighter pilot who has shot down five or more airplanes in a single day. This and the – (dash) indicates unconfirmed aerial victory claims for which Trenkel did not receive credit. This and the ? (question mark) indicates information discrepancies listed by Prien, Stemmer, Rodeike, Balke, Bock, Mathews and Foreman.
Claim	Date	Time	Type	Location	Claim	Date	Time	Type	Location
– 7. Staffel of Jagdgeschwader 77 – Eastern Front — March 1942
1	26 March 1942	15:02	I-153						
– Stab of Jagdgeschwader 52 – Eastern Front — June 1942
2	2 June 1942	12:37	I-16		3	22 June 1942	11:58	Yak-1	
– 2. Staffel of Jagdgeschwader 52 – June 1942 – 3 February 1943
4	29 June 1942	18:15	MiG-3		21	2 November 1942	10:32	R-5	PQ 59191
5	1 July 1942	14:23	MiG-3		22	2 November 1942	10:33? (Note: According to Mathews and Foreman claimed at 10:33.)	R-5	PQ 59191
6	12 July 1942	10:50	LaGG-3		23	30 November 1942	07:15	U-2	PQ 01242
— (Note: This unconfirmed claim is not listed by Prien, Stemmer, Rodeike and Bock.)	4 August 1942	—	LaGG-3		24	11 December 1942	11:10	R-5	PQ 01563
—	8 August 1942	—	Pe-2		25♠ (Note: This claim is not listed by Mathews and Foreman.)	17 December 1942	—	Il-2	
—	12 August 1942	—	Yak-1		26♠	17 December 1942	—	Il-2	
7	27 August 1942	14:23	LaGG-3	PQ 46332 west of Dzhankoi	27♠	17 December 1942	—	Il-2	
8	2 September 1942	08:30	LaGG-3	PQ 46253	28♠	17 December 1942	—	Il-2	
9	2 September 1942	13:00	LaGG-3	4 km (2.5 mi) northwest of Karmanovo	29♠	17 December 1942	—	Il-2	
10	10 September 1942	12:13	Il-2	PQ 47763 north of Taganaja	30♠	17 December 1942	—	Il-2	
11	2 October 1942	11:44	Il-2	PQ 49294; 40 km (25 mi) east of Stalingrad	31	21 December 1942	13:40	Il-2	PQ 01571
12	9 October 1942	12:50	Il-2	PQ 49124; 10 km (6.2 mi) northeast of Stalingrad	32	21 December 1942	13:42	Il-2	PQ 01583
13	9 October 1942	12:55	Il-2	PQ 49122 vicinity of Grebenka	33	21 December 1942	13:43	Il-2	12 km (7.5 mi) east of Kasinko
14	11 October 1942	06:27	Il-2	PQ 49122; 15 km (9.3 mi) northwest of Gumrak	34	21 December 1942	13:44	Il-2	12 km (7.5 mi) east of Kasinko
15	26 October 1942	14:04	Il-2	PQ 49361; 10 km (6.2 mi) south of Stalingrad	35	27 December 1942	06:58	Pe-2	PQ 01754
16	26 October 1942	14:09	Il-2	PQ 49362; 10 km (6.2 mi) south of Stalingrad	36	29 December 1942	09:35	LaGG-3	PQ 00314
17	26 October 1942	14:11	Il-2	PQ 49382; 25 km (16 mi) south of Bassargino	37	29 December 1942	12:18	La-5	PQ 01411
18	27 October 1942	08:35	Il-2	PQ 49124; 5 km (3.1 mi) east of Stalingrad	38	26 January 1943	12:30	Il-2 m.H. (Note: The "m.H." refers to an Ilyushin Il-2 with rear gunner (mit Heckschütze).)	PQ 72234
19	27 October 1942	16:21	La-5	PQ 49412; 5 km (3.1 mi) east of Stalingrad	39	29 January 1943	09:15	Il-2	PQ 73752
20	29 October 1942	11:28	LaGG-3	PQ 49282; 20–30 km (12–19 mi) east of Stalingrad	40	29 January 1943	09:17	Il-2	PQ 73733
– 2. Staffel of Jagdgeschwader 52 – Eastern Front — 4 February – 31 December 1943
41	26 March 1943	15:25	La-5	PQ 35 Ost 81742; 10 km (6.2 mi) northwest of Urazovo	70	30 May 1943	15:35	Yak-1	PQ 34 Ost 85141, 5 km (3.1 mi) southeast of Krymskaja east of Krymsk
42	27 March 1943	16:02	LaGG-3	PQ 35 Ost 62721	71	31 May 1943	08:12	Spitfire	PQ 34 Ost 86744 vicinity of Trojzkaja
43	28 March 1943	10:20	La-5	PQ 35 Ost 71851; 25 km (16 mi) west-southwest of Valuyki	72	31 May 1943	11:09	P-39	PQ 34 Ost 75232, north of Krymskaja; 10 km (6.2 mi) east of Krasnyi Lyman
44	9 April 1943	08:55	LaGG-3	PQ 34 Ost 86574 northwest of Sslaeanskaja	73	2 June 1943	04:43	La-5	PQ 34 Ost 85112, north of Krymskaja north of Mertschanskaja
45	11 April 1943	12:35	LaGG-3	PQ 34 Ost 86782 north of Mingrelskaya	74	2 June 1943	13:27	Pe-2	PQ 34 Ost 85112, north of Krymskaja north of Mertschanskaja
46♠	16 April 1943	07:31? (Note: According to Mathews and Foreman claimed at 07:38 over the Black Sea, southeast of Gelendzhik.)	LaGG-3	vicinity of Cholmskaja	75	2 June 1943	13:28	Pe-2	PQ 34 Ost 85121 vicinity of Sswobodnyj
47♠	16 April 1943	10:50	LaGG-3	east of Krymskaja southeast of Tscherkassowski	76	2 June 1943	17:52	La-5	PQ 34 Ost 75234, 2 km (1.2 mi) west of Krymskaja vicinity of Krymsk
48♠	16 April 1943	10:54? (Note: According to Mathews and Foreman claimed at 07:39 over the Black Sea, southeast of Gelendzhik.)	LaGG-3	east of Krymskaja	77	13 October 1943	10:15	Yak-9	PQ 34 Ost 58152, 10 km (6.2 mi) northeast of Zaporizhia northeast of Zaporizhia
49♠	16 April 1943	11:00	LaGG-3	PQ 34 Ost 8519, 5 km (3.1 mi) southeast of Achtyrskaja	78	13 October 1943	10:17	Il-2 m.H.	PQ 34 Ost 58153, 1 km (0.62 mi) east of Zaporizhia northeast of Zaporizhia
50♠	16 April 1943	11:46	LaGG-3	PQ 34 Ost 76762 vicinity of Bolschoj Rasnokol	79	13 October 1943	10:18	Il-2 m.H.	PQ 58154, 8 km (5.0 mi) south of Zaporizhia northeast of Zaporizhia
51	17 April 1943	11:10	LaGG-3	PQ 34 Ost 7546 southeast of Novorossiysk	80	14 October 1943	05:19	Il-2 m.H.	PQ 34 Ost 58152, northeast of Zaporizhia northeast of Zaporizhia
52	26 April 1943	14:01	Yak-1	PQ 34 Ost 85722 vicinity of Sswobodnyj	81	14 October 1943	11:50	Yak-9	PQ 34 Ost 58192; 15 km (9.3 mi) east-southeast of Zaporizhia
53	26 April 1943	14:04	Yak-1	PQ 34 Ost 85761 vicinity of Nowenjkij	82	15 October 1943	05:55	La-5	PQ 34 Ost 58153, east of Zaporizhia northeast of Zaporizhia
54	29 April 1943	10:02	Pe-2	PQ 35 Ost 61394; 20 km (12 mi) south-southwest of Bely Kolodez	83	15 October 1943	10:35	La-5	PQ 34 Ost 58131; 20 km (12 mi) northeast of Zaporizhia
55	7 May 1943	04:22	Il-2	PQ 35 Ost 71714 vicinity of Bely Kolodez	84	15 October 1943	13:58	Pe-2	PQ 34 Ost 58351; 20 km (12 mi) south-southeast of Zaporizhia
56	7 May 1943	18:19	LaGG-3	PQ 35 Ost 61723, vicinity of Bely Kolodez; 20 km (12 mi) east-southeast of Zolochev	85	22 October 1943	06:34	Il-2 m.H.	PQ 34 Ost 58534 vicinity of Wassilijewka
57	7 May 1943	18:21	LaGG-3	PQ 35 Ost 60131, vicinity of Bely Kolodez; 10 km (6.2 mi) east of Kharkov	86	22 October 1943	06:36	Il-2 m.H.	PQ 34 Ost 58563; Kalinowka
58	7 May 1943	18:24	LaGG-3	PQ 35 Ost 60212, 20 km (12 mi) north of Chuhuiv; 25 km (16 mi) east of Kharkov	87	22 October 1943	14:55	Il-2 m.H.	PQ 34 Ost 58361; 25 km (16 mi) southeast of Zaporizhia
59	9 May 1943	06:25	MiG-3	PQ 34 Ost 98872; 25 km (16 mi) west-southwest of Azov	88♠	23 October 1943	12:05	La-5	PQ 34 Ost 59744; 30 km (19 mi) north of Zaporizhia
60	9 May 1943	12:30	P-39	PQ 34 Ost 98731; 15 km (9.3 mi) north of Azov	89♠	23 October 1943	12:07	Il-2 m.H.	PQ 34 Ost 59743; 30 km (19 mi) north of Zaporizhia
61	11 May 1943	18:05	P-39	PQ 34 Ost 61495; 25 km (16 mi) east-southeast of Belgorod	90♠	23 October 1943	14:02	La-5	PQ 34 Ost 59753; 35 km (22 mi) north-northeast of Zaporizhia
62	23 May 1943	04:50	MBR-2	PQ 34 Ost 85594; Black Sea, south of Gelendzhik	91♠	23 October 1943	15:21	Il-2 m.H.	PQ 34 Ost 59751, 35 km (22 mi) north-northeast of Zaporizhia
63	24 May 1943	16:52	Boston	PQ 34 Ost 86822 east of Woronowskaja	92♠	23 October 1943	15:24	Il-2	PQ 59754; 35 km (22 mi) north-northeast of Zaporizhia
64	26 May 1943	05:11	Boston	PQ 34 Ost 85123, 5 km (3.1 mi) north of Abinskaja east of Mertschanskaja	93	24 October 1943	15:20	Il-2 m.H.	PQ 34 Ost 57152; 3 km (1.9 mi) northwest of Melitopol
65	26 May 1943	05:16	Pe-2	PQ 34 Ost 85172, 6 km (3.7 mi) south of Abinskaja southwest of Abinsk	94	27 October 1943	06:10	La-5	PQ 34 Ost 57773; 15 km (9.3 mi) west of Fedorowka
66	26 May 1943	09:42	P-39	PQ 34 Ost 85144 vicinity of Abinsk	95	27 October 1943	06:15	Yak-9	PQ 34 Ost 57744; 20 km (12 mi) west of Melitopol
67	30 May 1943	15:28	Pe-2	PQ 34 Ost 75262, 5 km (3.1 mi) west of Krymskaja south of Krymsk	96	28 October 1943	08:05	Yak-9	PQ 34 Ost 4733210 km (6.2 mi) west of Ivanovka
68	30 May 1943	15:30	Pe-2	PQ 34 Ost 76892, east of Kijewskoje; Sea of Azov, 30 km (19 mi) east-southeast of Mariupol	97	28 October 1943	10:58	Yak-9	PQ 34 Ost 47328 northeast of Agaiman
69	30 May 1943	15:31	Il-2 m.H.	PQ 34 Ost 75234, 3 km (1.9 mi) west of Krymskaja vicinity of Krymsk	98	1 November 1943	10:15	Il-2 m.H.	PQ 34 Ost 66731 east of Elitgen
– I. Gruppe of Jagdgeschwader 52 – Eastern Front — July 1944
99	13 July 1944	17:35	La-5	PQ 25 Ost 51711; 15 km (9.3 mi) north of Brody	107	18 July 1944	20:05	Yak-7	PQ 25 Ost 42851; 25 km (16 mi) southeast of Kobryn
100	14 July 1944	05:35	P-39	PQ 25 Ost 51524; 30 km (19 mi) south of Lutsk	108♠	19 July 1944	13:40	Yak-7	PQ 25 Ost 42573; 25 km (16 mi) west-northwest of Liuboml
101	14 July 1944	17:55	Il-2 m.H.	PQ 25 Ost 50189; 25 km (16 mi) east of Zolochiv	109♠	19 July 1944	16:44	P-39	PQ 25 Ost 32699; 30 km (19 mi) northeast of Chełm
102	15 July 1944	15:14	Yak-7	PQ 25 Ost 51548; 30 km (19 mi) north of Brody	110♠	19 July 1944	16:49	Il-2 m.H.	PQ 25 Ost 42713 vicinity of Liuboml
103	15 July 1944	16:58	Yak-7	PQ 25 Ost 41414; 15 km (9.3 mi) southeast of Włodzimierz	111♠	19 July 1944	19:48	Yak-7	PQ 25 Ost 42777; 25 km (16 mi) northwest of Włodzimierz
104	15 July 1944	17:05	Il-2	PQ 25 Ost 41447; 25 km (16 mi) southeast of Włodzimierz	112♠	19 July 1944	19:50	Il-2 m.H.	PQ 25 Ost 42767; 10 km (6.2 mi) south of Liuboml
105	16 July 1944	17:45	P-39	PQ 25 Ost 51575; 20 km (12 mi) north of Brody	113	21 July 1944	15:42? (Note: According to Mathews and Foreman claimed at 15:45.)	P-39	PQ 25 Ost 40432; 20 km (12 mi) south-southwest of Lviv
106	17 July 1944	18:05	P-39	PQ 25 Ost 41796; 15 km (9.3 mi) northwest of Busk					
– 2. Staffel of Jagdgeschwader 52 – Eastern Front — September 1944 – April 1945
114	12 September 1944	16:10	Il-2	PQ 25 Ost 10361; 15 km (9.3 mi) south of Jasło	127♠	15 October 1944	14:11	Boston	PQ 25 Ost 13347; 10 km (6.2 mi) west of Pristina
115	12 September 1944	16:12	Il-2	PQ 25 Ost 10391; 20 km (12 mi) south of Jasło	128	16 October 1944	10:45	Il-2 m.H.	PQ 25 Ost 13154; 30 km (19 mi) south of Pristina
116	13 September 1944	11:35? (Note: According to Mathews and Foreman claimed at 11:54.)	B-17	PQ 15 Ost 90452; 35 km (22 mi) southwest of Kraków	129	16 October 1944	13:05	Il-2 m.H.? (Note: According to Mathews and Foreman claimed as a Lavochkin La-5.)	PQ 25 Ost 13126; 20 km (12 mi) east-northeast of Trepca
117	21 September 1944	15:32	Yak-9	PQ 25 Ost 10696; 35 km (22 mi) south-southwest of Sanok	130	17 October 1944	08:00	Pe-2	PQ 25 Ost 25444; 15 km (9.3 mi) west of Turnu Severin
118	21 September 1944	17:54	La-5	PQ 25 Ost 10665; 25 km (16 mi) southwest of Sanok	131	27 October 1944	15:10	Yak-3	PQ 25 Ost 25583; 25 km (16 mi) east-southeast of Majdanpek
119	22 September 1944	11:30	Yak-4	PQ 25 Ost 10835	132	27 October 1944	15:13	Yak-3	PQ 25 Ost 25581
120	22 September 1944	11:33	Yak-4	PQ 25 Ost 10862; 45 km (28 mi) southwest of Sanok	133	16 February 1945	10:45	Il-2	
121	14 October 1944	14:41	Yak-9	PQ 25 Ost 13143; 10 km (6.2 mi) east of Trepca	134	19 February 1945	15:10	Pe-2	
122♠	15 October 1944	08:15	Yak-9	PQ 25 Ost 13345; 10 km (6.2 mi) west of Pristina	135	19 February 1945	15:15	Pe-2	
123♠	15 October 1944	08:17	Il-2 m.H.	PQ 25 Ost 13348; 10 km (6.2 mi) west of Pristina	136	20 February 1945	13:05	Yak-9	
124♠	15 October 1944	10:21	Il-2 m.H.	PQ 25 Ost 13344; 10 km (6.2 mi) west of Pristina	137	25 February 1945	16:05	Yak-9	
125♠	15 October 1944	10:24	Il-2 m.H.	PQ 25 Ost 13342; 10 km (6.2 mi) west of Pristina	138	11 March 1945	—	Yak-9	
126♠	15 October 1944	10:26	Il-2 m.H.	PQ 25 Ost 13376; 10 km (6.2 mi) southwest of Pristina					

=== Awards ===
- Iron Cross (1939) 2nd and 1st Class
- Honor Goblet of the Luftwaffe on 1 February 1943 as Feldwebel and pilot
- German Cross in Gold on 15 January 1943 as Feldwebel in the 2./Jagdgeschwader 52
- Knight's Cross of the Iron Cross on 19 August 1943 as Oberfeldwebel and pilot in the 2./Jagdgeschwader 52
