= Schielo =

- Stadtteil of Harzgerode
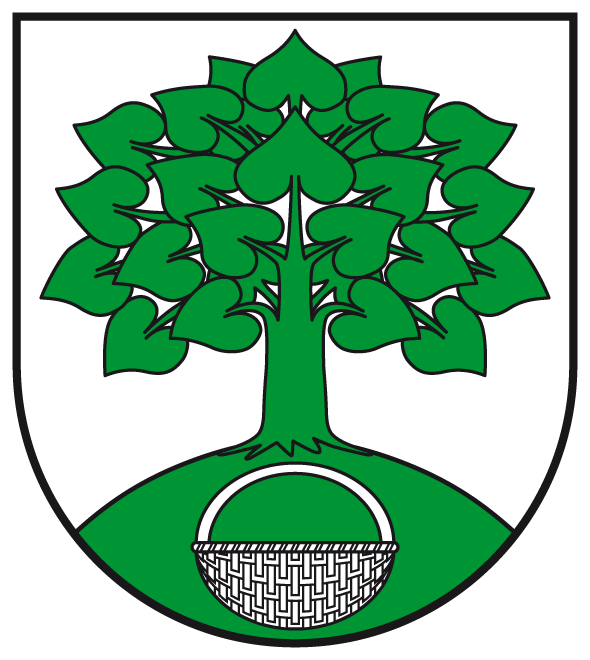
- Coat of arms
- Interactive map of Schielo
- Location within Germany Location within Saxony-Anhalt
- Coordinates: 51°37′7″N 11°13′16″E
- Country: Germany
- State: Saxony-Anhalt
- District: Harz
- Town: Harzgerode

Area
  - Total: 19.77 km^{2} (7.63 sq mi)
- Elevation: 310 m (1,020 ft)

Population (2006-12-31)
  - Total: 571
  - Density: 28.9/km^{2} (74.8/sq mi)
- Time zone: UTC+01:00 (CET)
  - Summer (DST): UTC+02:00 (CEST)
- Postal codes: 06493
- Dialling codes: 039484
- Vehicle registration: HZ

Schielo is a village and a former municipality in the district of Harz, Saxony-Anhalt, Germany. Since 1 August 2009, it is part of the town of Harzgerode. Basket weaving was common until in the early 20th century logging took over. Today agriculture, a number of small businesses, a care home specialising in residential and nursing dementia care, as well as tourism related activities dominate the area.

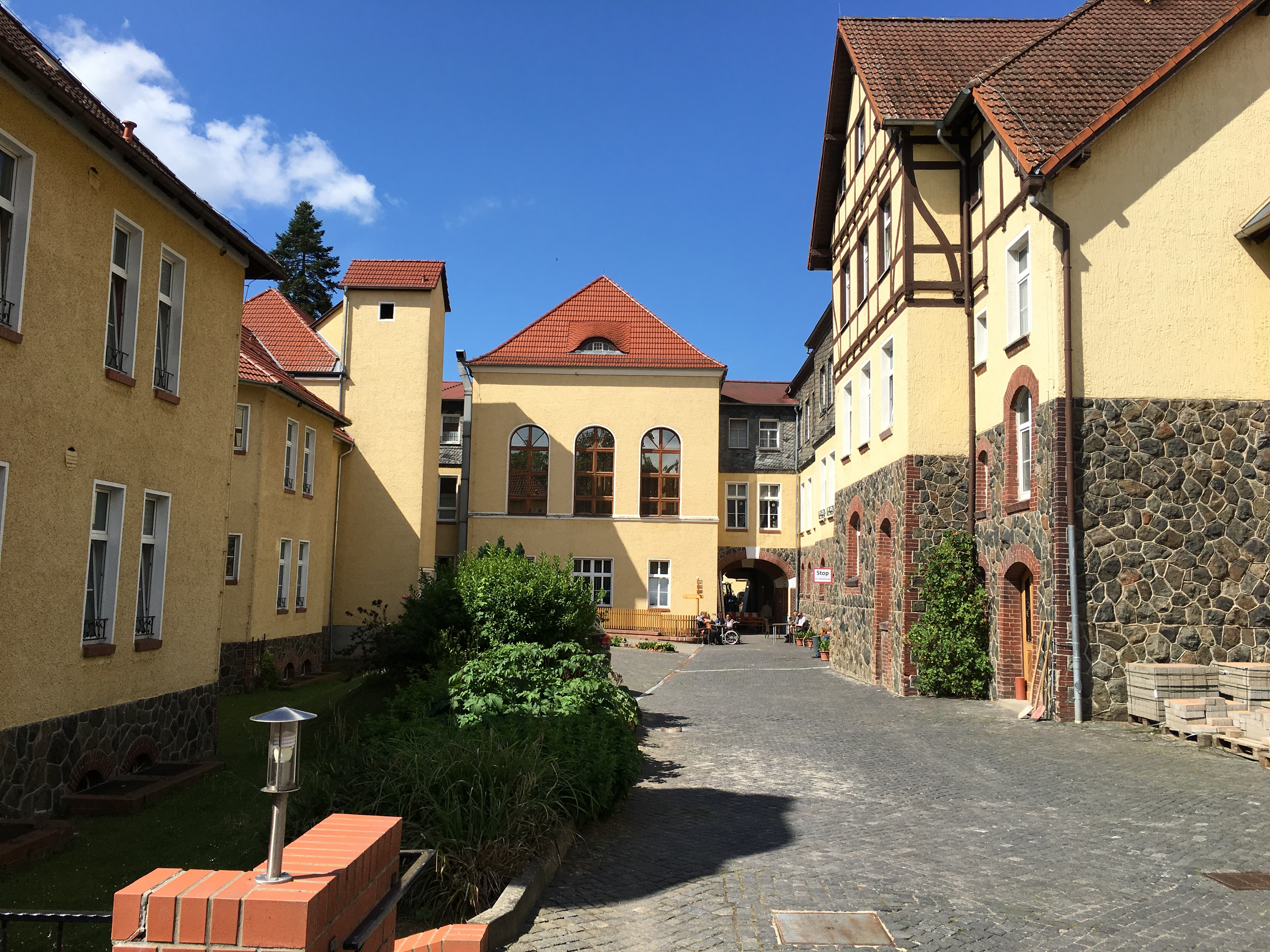
The main building from the nursing home built in 1905

== Location ==
Schielo lies to the east of Harzgerode, to the north of Königerode and the B242 Cross-Harz-Highway and to the west of Molmerswende.

== Hiking ==
While Schielo is outside the area of the Harzer Wandernadel hiking system, it is only three kilometers from the E11 european long distance path which runs from Ballenstedt to Wippra through the neighboring villages of Molmerswende and Steinbrücken. From Schielo, local trails lead to Anhalt Castle and Falkenstein Castle.

== Notable people ==
- Karl Blossfeldt (June 13, 1865 – December 9, 1932), photographer, born in Schielo.

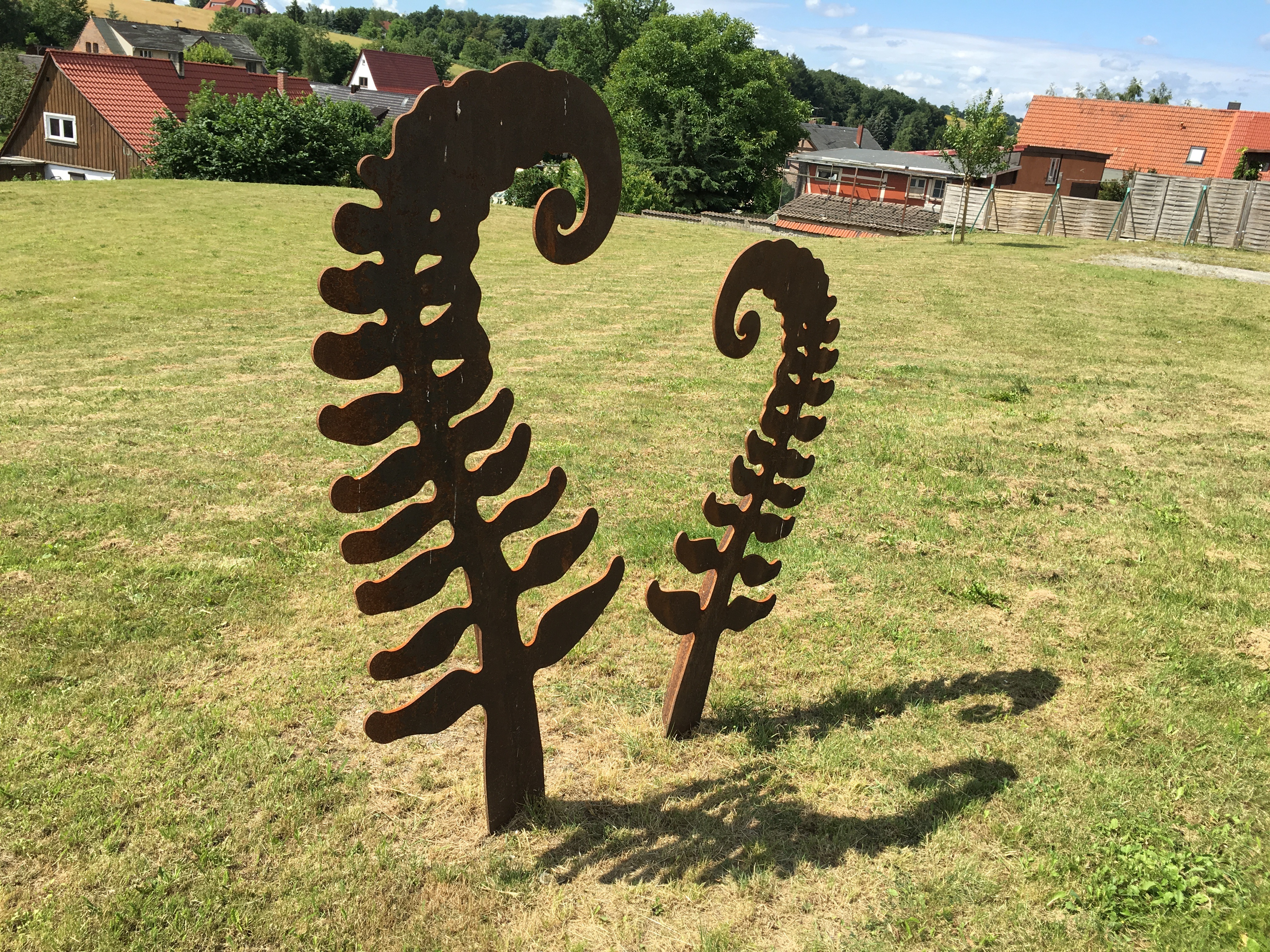
Sculpture in remembrance to the photographer Karl Blossfeldt
