= Selkenfelde =

Coordinates: 51°39.027′N 10°55.131′E

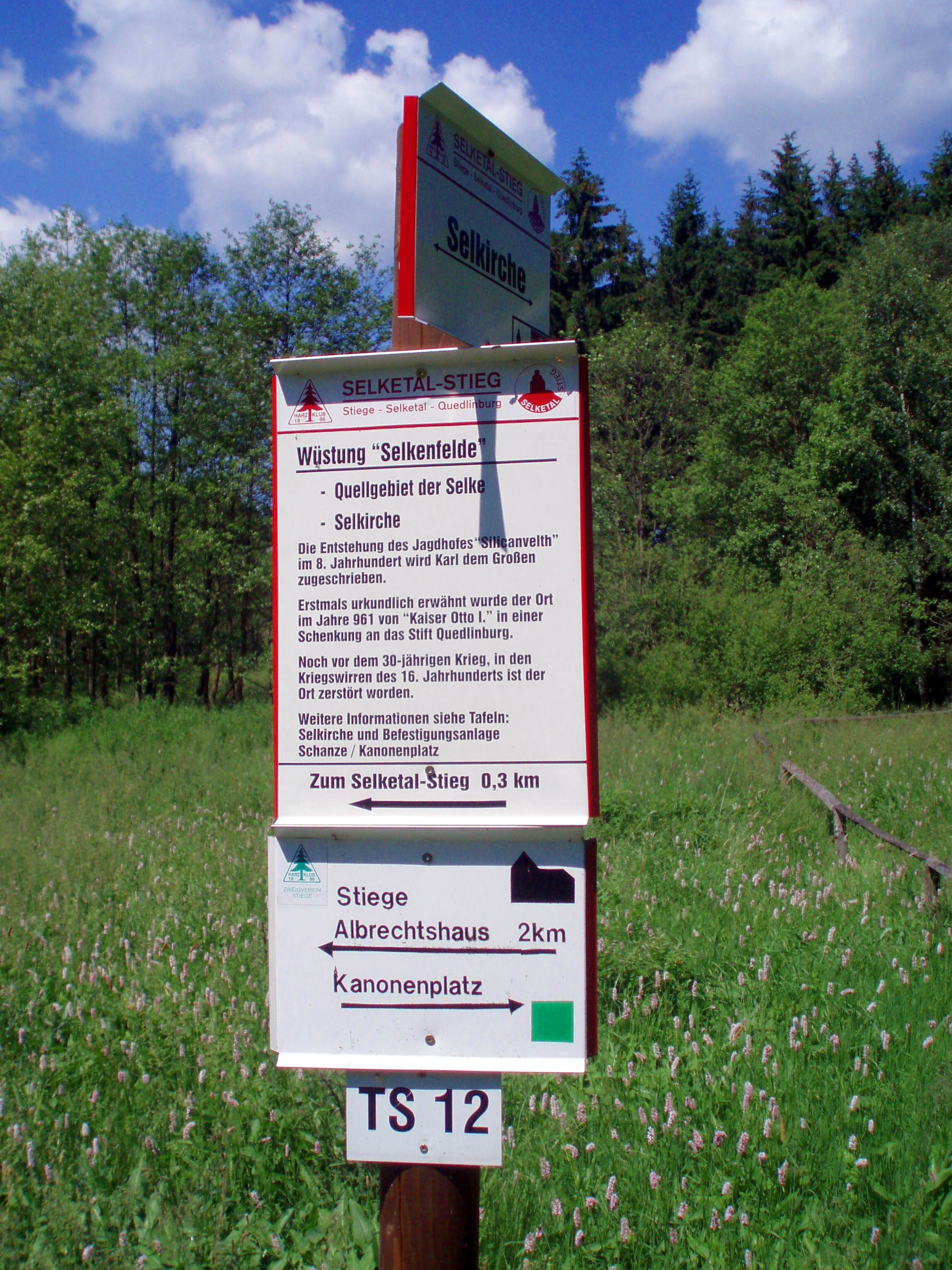
The abandoned village of Selkenfelde

Selkenfelde is an abandoned village in Saxony-Anhalt in the central German district of Harz. It is located not far from the B 242 federal road (Harz High Road) between Stiege (Harz) and Güntersberge. According to legend the origins of the village go back to Charlemagne. It was first mentioned as Silicanuelth in AD 961 in two documents by King Otto I and co-regent Otto II dated 15 and 25 July. Selkenfelde had been already abandoned by the Thirty Years' War.

The abandoned village of Selkenfelde is incorporated in the network of hiking checkpoints that form the Harzer Wandernadel.
