= Johann Gottlieb Hantzsch =

German genre painter

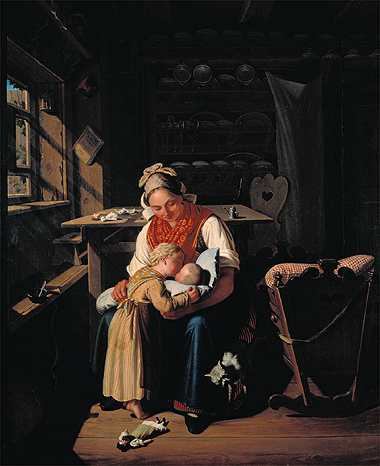
- Domestic Scene (1831)
- Born: 19 March 1794; Neudorf, Electorate of Saxony, Holy Roman Empire
- Died: 3 April 1848 (aged 54); Dresden, Kingdom of Saxony, German Confederation
- Education: Art Academy, Dresden
- Known for: Painting
- Notable work: Der blinde Dorfgeiger ('The blind village violinist'); Der erste Zahn ('The first tooth'); Dorfhochzeit ('Village wedding'); Häusliche Szene ('Domestic scene')
- Movement: Romanticism
- Spouse: Mathilde Kretzschmar

Johann Gottlieb Hantzsch (19 March 1794 – 3 April 1848) was a German genre painter.

== Life and work ==
Hantzsch was the son of a bricklayer. He attended the Art Academy in Dresden from 1811 to 1822. Initially he devoted himself to painting military motifs and Romantic depictions. From 1827 Hantzsch painted mainly small motifs depicting domestic bourgeois life, some of which were etched by his friend Ludwig Richter. From 1834 he worked as an art teacher in the Saxon Cadet Corps.

Johann Gottlieb Hantzsch was married to Mathilde Kretzschmar (1805–1883). His daughter Agnes Mathilde (1840–1861) married Ludwig Richter's son Johannes Heinrich Richter (1830–1890) in 1859. After the death of his first wife, Johannes Richter married Hantzsch's second daughter, Julie Amalie.

== Works ==
- Der blinde Dorfgeiger ('The blind village violinist')
- Der erste Zahn ('The first tooth')
- Dorfhochzeit ('Village wedding')
- Häusliche Szene ('Domestic scene')
