= Heinrichsberg (disambiguation) =

Heinrichsberg is the name of the following:

Places:

- Heinrichsberg, a village in the municipality of Loitsche-Heinrichsberg in Saxony-Anhalt, Germany
- Heinrichsberg (Kilb), a catastral municipality in Lower Austria
- Heinrichsberg (Pittenhart), a village in the municipality of Pittenhart
- Heinrichsberg (Markt Massing), a village in Markt Massing
- Heinrichsberg in Bohemia, the Jindřichova Hora

Hills:

- Heinrichsberg (Spessart), hill near Dörrmorsbach, municipality of Haibach (Unterfranken), Germany
- Heinrichsberg (Jena) ("Am Heinrichsberg" road), Germany
- Heinrichsberg, a hill near Harzgerode, Saxony-Anhalt, Germany, see Heinrichsberg Castle

Castle:

- Heinrichsberg Castle in Harzgerode, Saxony-Anhalt, Germany

See also

- Heinrichsburg (disambiguation)
