= Heinrichsburg =

Heinrichsburg refers to:

in Germany

- Heinrichsburg (Biberach), a castle near Biberach in Baden-Württemberg
- Heinrichsburg (Gernrode), a castle near Gernrode in Saxony-Anhalt
- Heinrichsburg (Harz), a ruined castle near Neustadt im Harz, Lower Saxony
- Lichtenberg Castle (Salzgitter), a ruined castle near Salzgitter in Lower Saxony

in Poland:

- Heinrichsburg (Poland), a castle near Staniszów in Powiat Jeleniogórski in the Voivodship of Lower Silesia

See also: Heinrichsberg (disambiguation)
