= Güntersburg =

Coordinates: 51°38′16.3″N 10°58′15.4″E

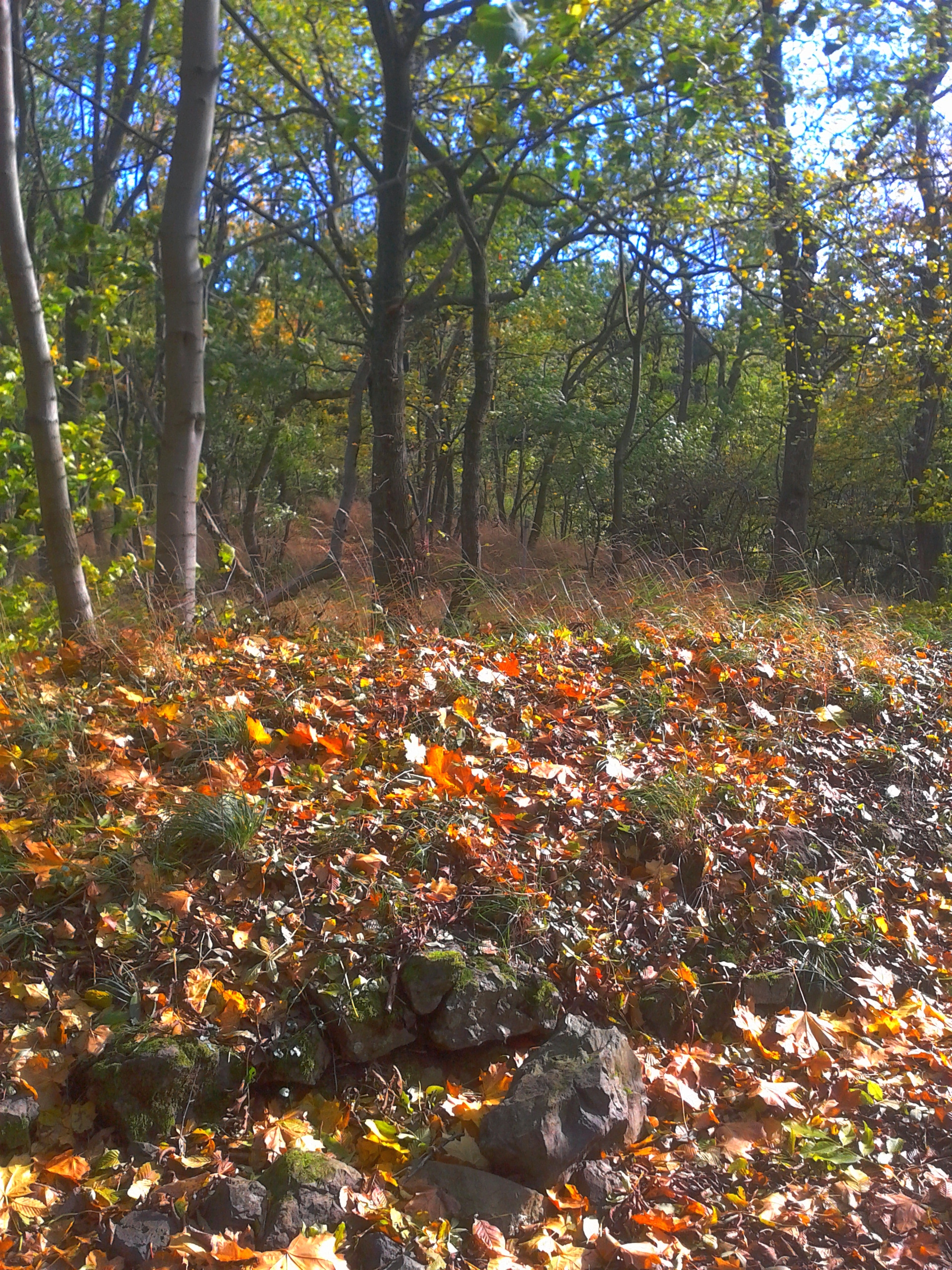
Foundation walls

The ruined castle of Güntersburg stands about 2 km (1.2 mi) southwest of Güntersberge in the Harz mountain range of central Germany.

== Condition ==
The ruins are located on the 485 m (1,591 ft) Kohlberg hill above the Selke valley. The castle site is very large and has an area of about 3 hectares (7.4 acres). It probably included a fortified settlement, possibly preceding modern Güntersberge, beside the proper castle. To the northwest the site was protected by a rampart and a 150 m (490 ft) long ditch, whose scale can still be easily made out today. To the southeast the site is bounded by the hillside that falls steeply into the Selke valley.

Of the former buildings only a few foundation walls are recognisable. Still easy to make out are the foundation walls of the two gatehouse towers. Little is known of its history. The castle was probably built in the 11th century. First mentioned around 1326, the site was already recorded as devastated by about 1600. Among its former owners were the Lords of Kneitlingen and the Counts of Stolberg.

According to legend, the castle was occupied by robber barons at last and one of their victims, the daughter of a merchant, is still supposed to appear as a white apparition today to those venturing near to the castle at night. The bunch of keys she carries with her is supposed to once have brought a curse on a monk.
