= Mägdesprung =

- Ortsteil of Harzgerode
- Interactive map of Mägdesprung
- Location within Germany Location within Saxony-Anhalt
- Coordinates: 51°40′9.70″N 11°7′48.65″E
- Country: Germany
- State: Saxony-Anhalt
- District: Harz
- Town: Harzgerode
- Elevation: 295 m (968 ft)
- Time zone: UTC+01:00 (CET)
  - Summer (DST): UTC+02:00 (CEST)
- Postal codes: 06493
- Dialling codes: 039484

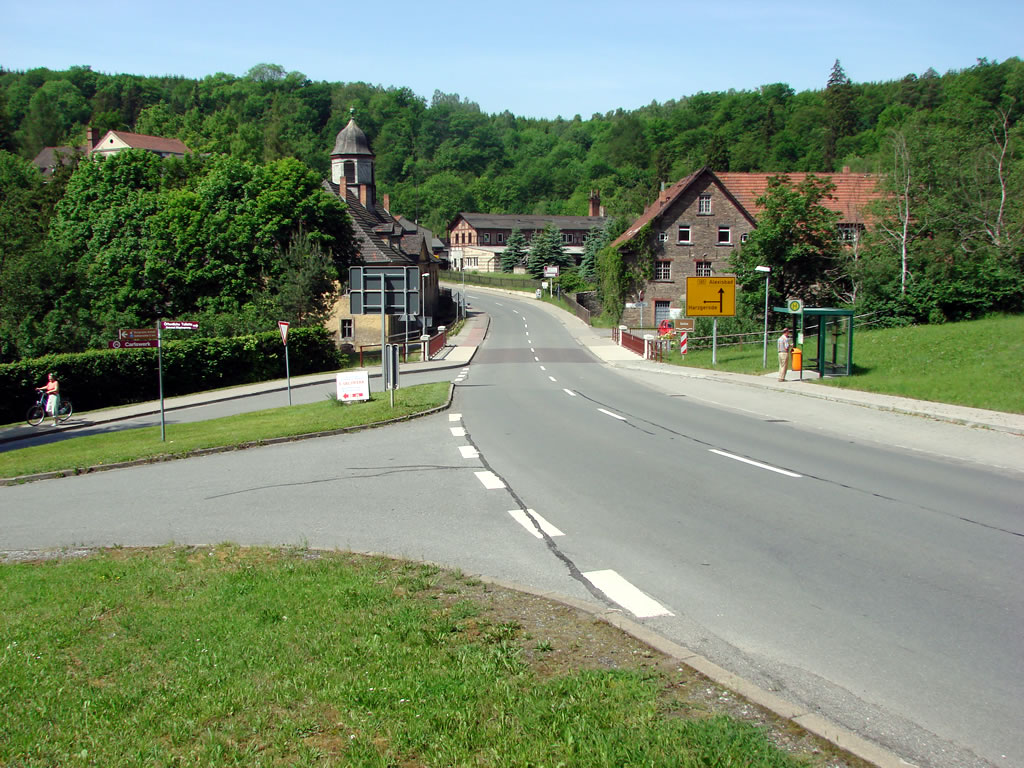
Mägdesprung in the Selke valley

Mägdesprung is a village in the municipality of Harzgerode in the district of Harz. It nestles in the Harz Mountains at a height of 295 m.

== History ==
There was a mill here below the Mägdetrappe until the Thirty Years' War. In 1646 an ironworks was built on the initiative of Frederick of Anhalt-Harzgerode that was not very successful to begin with, nevertheless it was considerably expanded in 1769. Until the second half of the 19th century, the works proved very profitable in the field of decorative castings. Its furnace was finally closed in 1876. On 7 August 1887, a railway line from Gernrode to Mägdesprung was opened by the Gernrode-Harzgerode Railway Company (GHE), today the Harz Narrow Gauge Railways. On 18 April 1945 the pattern house (Modellhaus) of the factory fell victim to the fighting at the end of the Second World War. In 1972 the ironworks was taken over by the VEB Gas- und Heizgerätewerk Mägdesprung, who used it mainly to manufacture gas and heating equipment. The economic changes after German reunification in 1990 meant that the factory was only able to sustain the production of a small quantity of gas cookers in the years that followed. The firm became very small and was renamed to the Mägdesprunger Eisenhüttenwerk GmbH.

== Location ==
Mägdesprung lies north of Harzgerode in the Selke valley on the River Selke. The village's civil parish includes the hamlets of Drahtzug and Stahlhammer as well as Friedrichshammer I - IV. The names recall the iron industry, Drahtzug being German for wire cable, Stahlhammer for steel hammermill, and Friedrichshammer for Frederick's hammermill. The parish runs along the Selke river and its valley.

== Name ==
The village's name comes from a legend, the Mägdesprung about a maid ("Magd") who leapt the Selke valley (Sprung = "jump") and which was recounted by the Brothers Grimm and Ludwig Bechstein.

== Hamlets ==
There is a number of small settlements, especially on the sites of the old hammermills.

- Erster Hammer / Ist Friedrichhammer
- Zweiter Hammer / IInd Friedrichhammer
- Dritter Hammer / IIIrd Friedrichhammer
- Forsthaus Scheerenstieg (abandoned village of Schibeck)
- Vierter Hammer / IVth Friedrichhammer - location of checkpoint 179 in the Harzer Wandernadel hiking system.
- Schneidemühle
- Meiseberg
- Selkemühle - location of checkpoint 180 in the Harzer Wandernadel hiking system.

== Places of interest ==
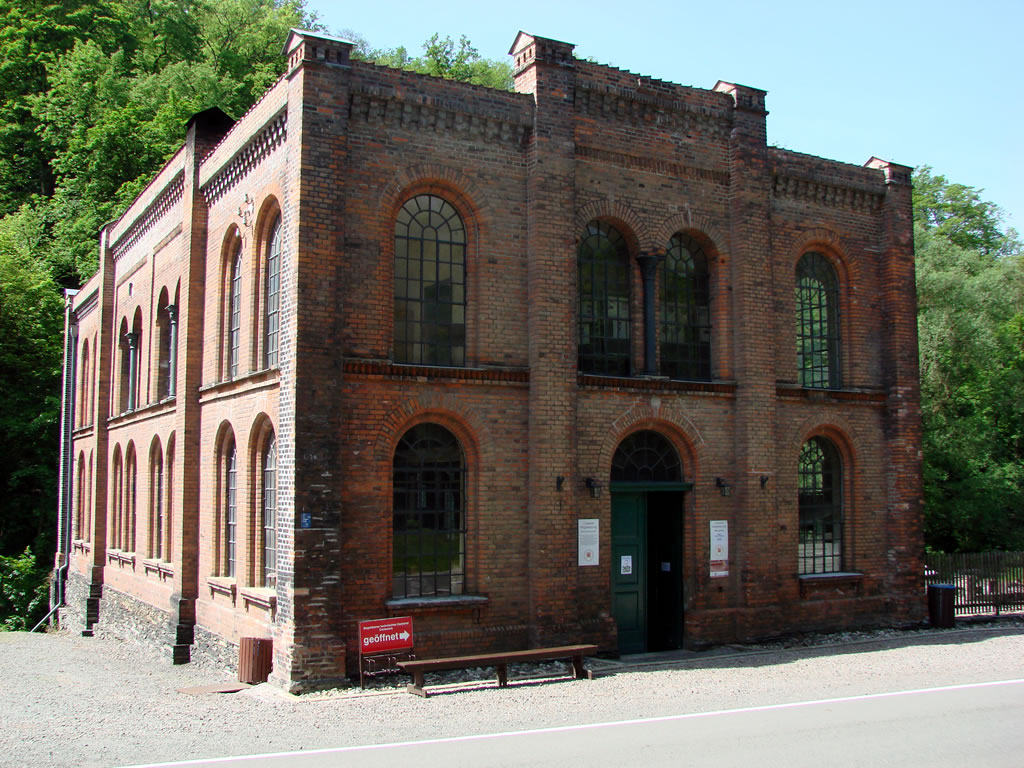
The "Carlswerk" Smelting Museum at Mägdesprung

Apart from its location in the Selke valley and links to the hiking network, which includes the Selkestieg that runs along the valley, the Carlswerk Smelting Museum is worth visiting. The renovated pilgrim's chapel in the cemetery at IIIrd Friedrichshammer, the deer sculptures, the obelisk and the Mägdetrappe with its splendid view over the Selke valley and across to the heights of the Viktorshöhe are other places of interest.

=== Regular events ===
- last weekend in July: Smeltery Day ("Hüttentag")
- last weekend in August: East Harz Motorbike Meet (Ostharzer Motorradtreffen). The start of the drive is in Mägdesprung)

== Notable people ==
- Johann Ludwig Carl Zincken (1791–1862), Mineralogist and mining director
- Carl Andreas Bischof (1812-1884), Metallurgist, created the first gas generator
- Eberhard Prüter (1945-2014), actor and voice actor, best known for the voice of Squidward Tentacles in the German dub of SpongeBob SquarePants.

== Transport links ==
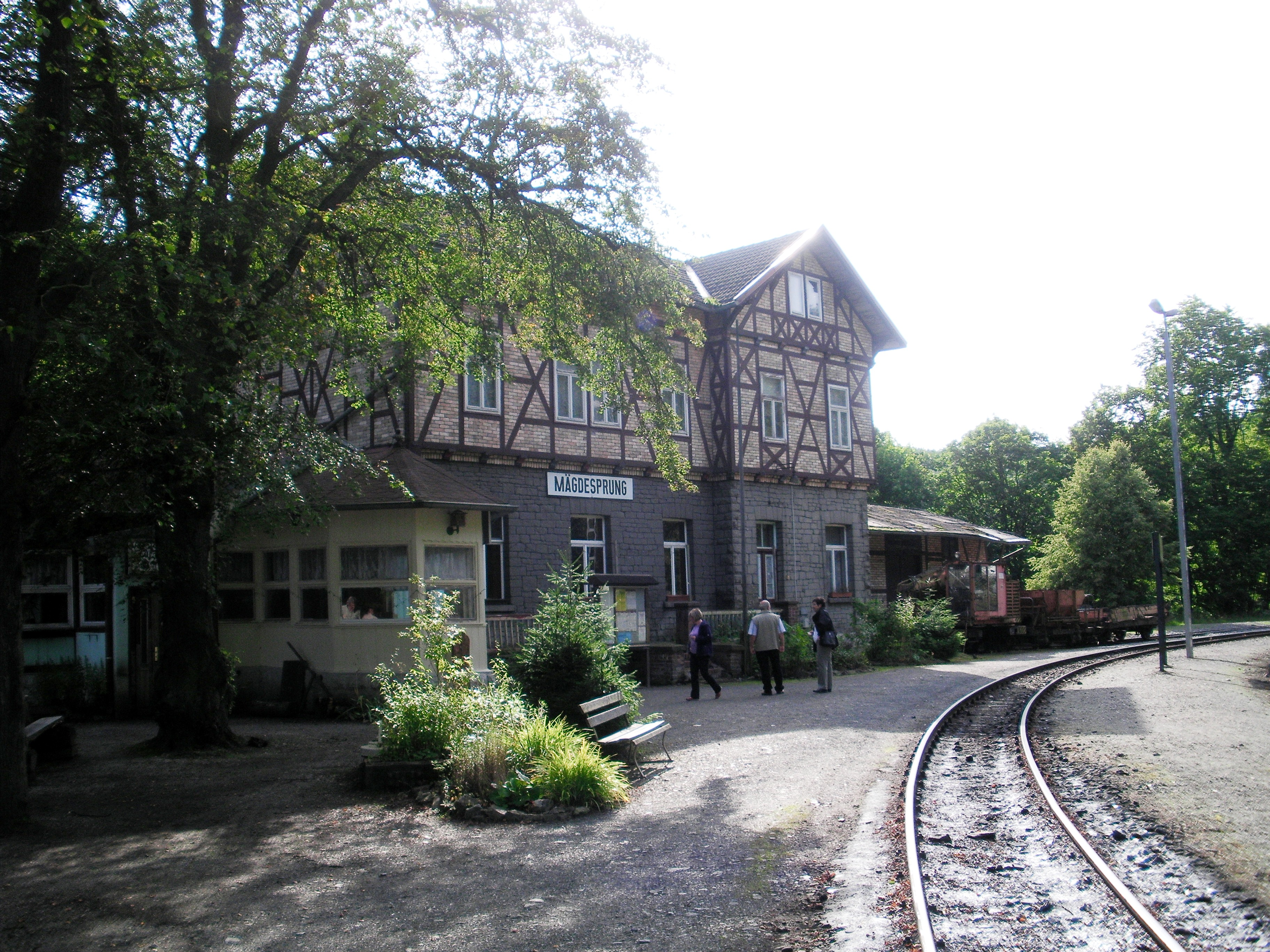
Mägdesprung station on the Selke Valley Railway

The village lies on the B 185 federal road and has a bus stop on the Q-Bus Nahverkehrsgesellschaft network as well as a station on the Selke Valley Railway between Gernrode and Alexisbad.

== Sources ==
- Berent Schwineköper (Hrsg.): Provinz Sachsen Anhalt. In: Handbuch der Historischen Stätten Deutschlands. Band 11. Alfred Kröner Verlag, Stuttgart 1987, ISBN 3-520-31402-9
