= Verein Deutscher Ingenieure =

German engineering and natural science organization

- Logo
- Abbreviation: VDI
- Formation: May 12, 1856
- Purpose: Professional Society
- Location: Düsseldorf, Germany
- Region served: Germany
- President: Lutz Eckstein
- Website: http://www.vdi.eu

Verein Deutscher Ingenieure (VDI; transl. Association of German Engineers) is an organisation of about 135,000 engineers and natural scientists. More than 12,000 honorary experts process the latest technical findings each year to promote the technology location. Established in 1856, it is the largest engineering association in Western Europe. Its role in Germany is comparable to that of the American Society of Civil Engineers (ASCE) in the United States or Engineers Australia (EA) in Australia, but includes broader field work. It is not a union, but promotes the advancement of technology and represents the interests of engineers and engineering businesses in Germany.

== History ==
The organisation was founded on May 12, 1856 by fellow researchers from the Academic Fraternity Hütte, in the small town of Alexisbad, with the first journal officially being released to the public in 1857. In 1866 the VDI helped establish the predecessor of Technischer Überwachungsverein, the Dampfkesselüberwachungsvereinen (transl. Steam boiler inspection association). At the time, engineering was not regarded to be of the same ranking as scientific disciplines, which the VDI changed in 1899, with the re-categorisation of the Technische Hochschule as a type of University. In 1923 the VDI Verlag was founded, publishing monthly newspapers which are distributed to members. After the Second World War the VDI moved its headquarters from Berlin to Düsseldorf, where it remains now today. It also helped establish the Arbeitsgemeinschaft für Kerntechnik (transl. Society for Nuclear Technology) in 1956, which resulted in the German Atomforum, in 1959. In recent times, the VDI worked in conjunction with EXPO 2000 Hannover GmbH to establish the first worldwide engineering day.

== Structure ==
Throughout its history, the VDI has been served by many presidents, including:

- Carl von Linde (1904–1905)
- Oskar von Miller (1912–1914)
- Fritz Todt (1939–1942)
- Hans Bluhm (1947–1952)
- Hans Schuberth (1953–1956)
- Gerhard Wilhelm Becker (1978–1982)
- Karl Eugen Becker (1983–1988)
- Joachim Pöppel (1989–1991)
- Klaus Czeguhn (1992–1994)
- Hans-Jürgen Warnecke (1995–1997)
- Hubertus Christ (1998–2003)
- Eike Lehmann (2004–2007)
- Bruno O. Braun (2007-2012)
- Udo Ungeheuer (2013–2018)
- Volker Kefer (2019–2022)
- Lutz Eckstein (since 2023)

== Notable Members ==
- Blake R. Van Leer, United States Army officer and president of Georgia Institute of Technology
- Carl von Linde

== Membership ==
In 2013 the VDI had over 150,000 registered members worldwide, which also included scientists and I.T professionals. Members have opportunities to ask for help regarding job prospects and opportunities, receive news about the engineering profession, especially in Germany, as well as other services such as specialised insurance. Members are also able to attach the suffix VDI upon becoming a member, and is classified as a legitimate name suffix.
