= Bundesstraße 185 =

Federal highway in Germany

B 185
- Bundesstraße 185

Route information
- Length: 100 km (62 mi)

Major junctions
- B 242

Location
- Country: Germany

Highway system
- Roads in Germany; Autobahns; List; Federal; List; State; E-roads

The Bundesstraße 185 (abbreviation: B 185) is a German federal road or Bundesstraße in the state of Saxony-Anhalt. It runs from east to west connecting the town of Dessau-Roßlau with the Harz mountain region. Between Kleinpaschleben and Dessau-Roßlau the B 185 is part of the German Avenue Road.

== History ==
The present Bundesstraße 185 links the most important Residenz towns of the former Principality of Anhalt. Only the section between Aschersleben and Ermsleben lay on Prussian territory. This section was known as Prussian State Road No. 90a (preußische Staatschaussee Nr. 90a) which was completed in 1842.

The 64.7 km long Reichsstraße 185 between Dessau and Aschersleben was built around 1937. In the 1960s the road was extended as far as Alexisbad in the Harz mountains.

== Junctions lists ==
Legend:

- I/C - Interchange, I/S - Intersection, RSA - Rest and service area, OBR - Overhead bridge restaurant, R/R - Restaurant and rest plaza, L/B - Layby, V/P - Vista point, TN - tunnel, T/P - Toll plaza, BR - Bridge

	Harzgerode-Alexisbad	B 242
	Selke Valley Railway	
	Ballenstedt	
	Ermsleben	
	Aschersleben	
	Route combined with B 6n	
	Aschersleben-West	B 6
	Aschersleben-Zentrum	B 180
	Aschersleben-Ost	
	Güsten	
	Ilberstedt	
	Ilberstedt	
	Bernburg	
	Kleinpaschleben	
	Köthen	B 183
	Köthen-Porst	B 187a
	Mosigkau	
	Dessau-Roßlau	B 184
10	Dessau-Ost	A 9 B 107
