= Güntersberge =

- Ortsteil of Harzgerode
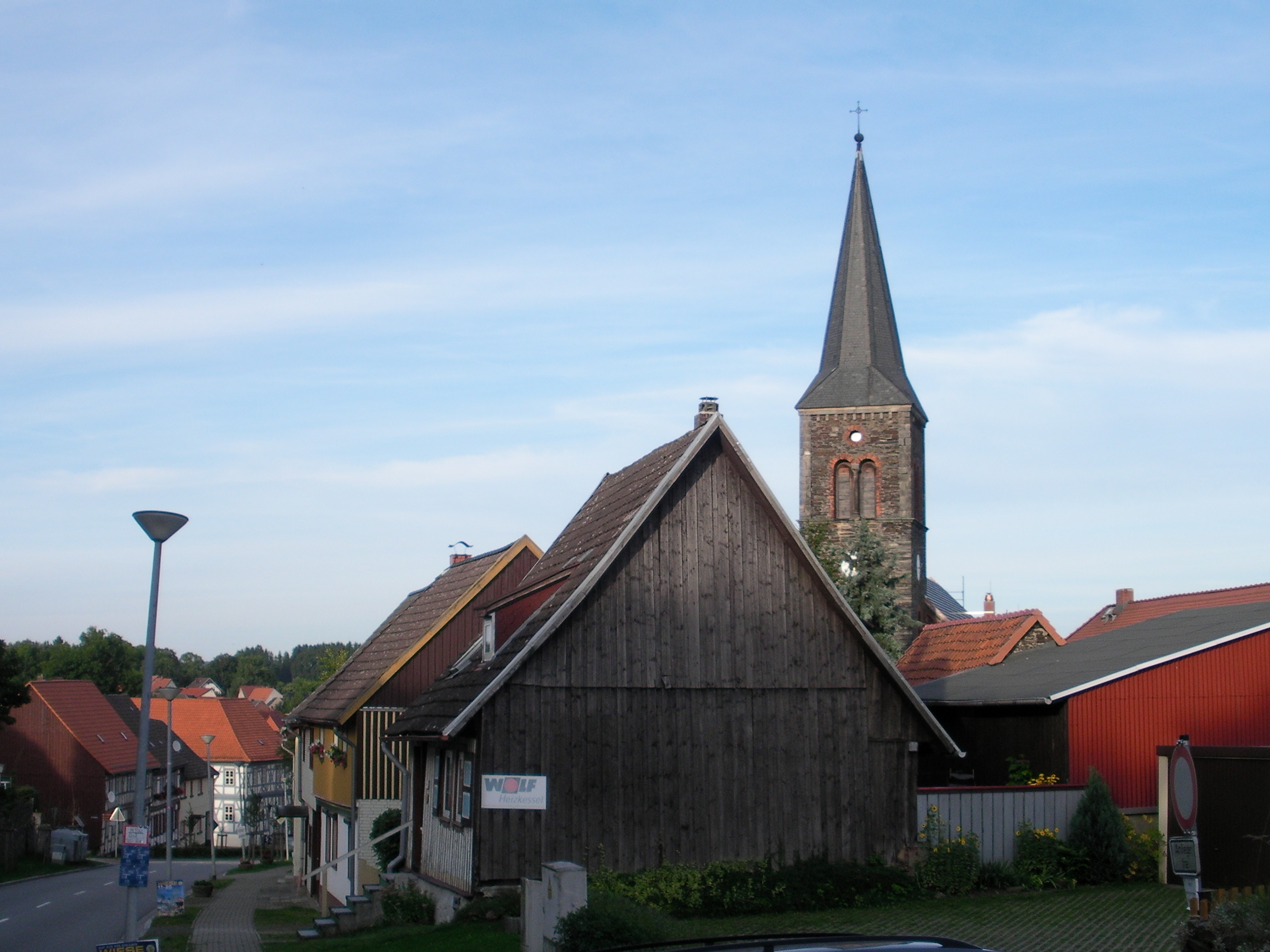
- View to St Martin's parish church

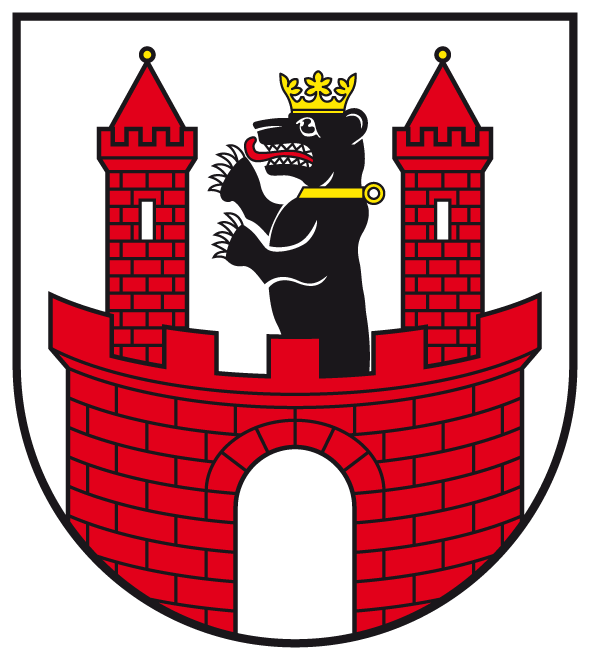
- Coat of arms
- Interactive map of Güntersberge
- Location within Germany Location within Saxony-Anhalt
- Coordinates: 51°38′38″N 10°58′41″E
- Country: Germany
- State: Saxony-Anhalt
- District: Harz
- Town: Harzgerode

Area
  - Total: 32.73 km^{2} (12.64 sq mi)
- Elevation: 412 m (1,352 ft)

Population (2011)
  - Total: 760
  - Density: 23/km^{2} (60/sq mi)
- Time zone: UTC+01:00 (CET)
  - Summer (DST): UTC+02:00 (CEST)
- Postal codes: 06507
- Dialling codes: 039488
- Vehicle registration: QLB, HZ
- Website: www.guentersberge-harz.de

Güntersberge (German pronunciation: [ˌɡʏntɐsˈbɛʁɡə]) is a village and a former town in Harz District, in Saxony-Anhalt, Germany. It has held the status of an officially recognized resort town since 2001. Güntersberge, together with the other municipalities of the former Verwaltungsgemeinschaft ("collective municipality") Unterharz, merged into the town of Harzgerode as of 1 August 2009.

== Geography ==
The settlement is located in the upper Selke Valley, in the lower eastern part of the Harz mountain range close to the border with Thuringia. In the northwest, down the scenic Selke Valley Trail, is the abandoned village of Selkenfelde. In the southwest is the Katzsohlteich reservoir of the Katzsohlbach, a right tributary of the Selke river. The Steinfurtbach and other numerous mountain brooks run through the area.

Güntersberge station is a stop on the Selke Valley Railway, part of the Harz Narrow Gauge Railways network, running from Quedlinburg up the Harz range to Hasselfelde. The Bundesstraße 242 highway runs through the area.

== History ==
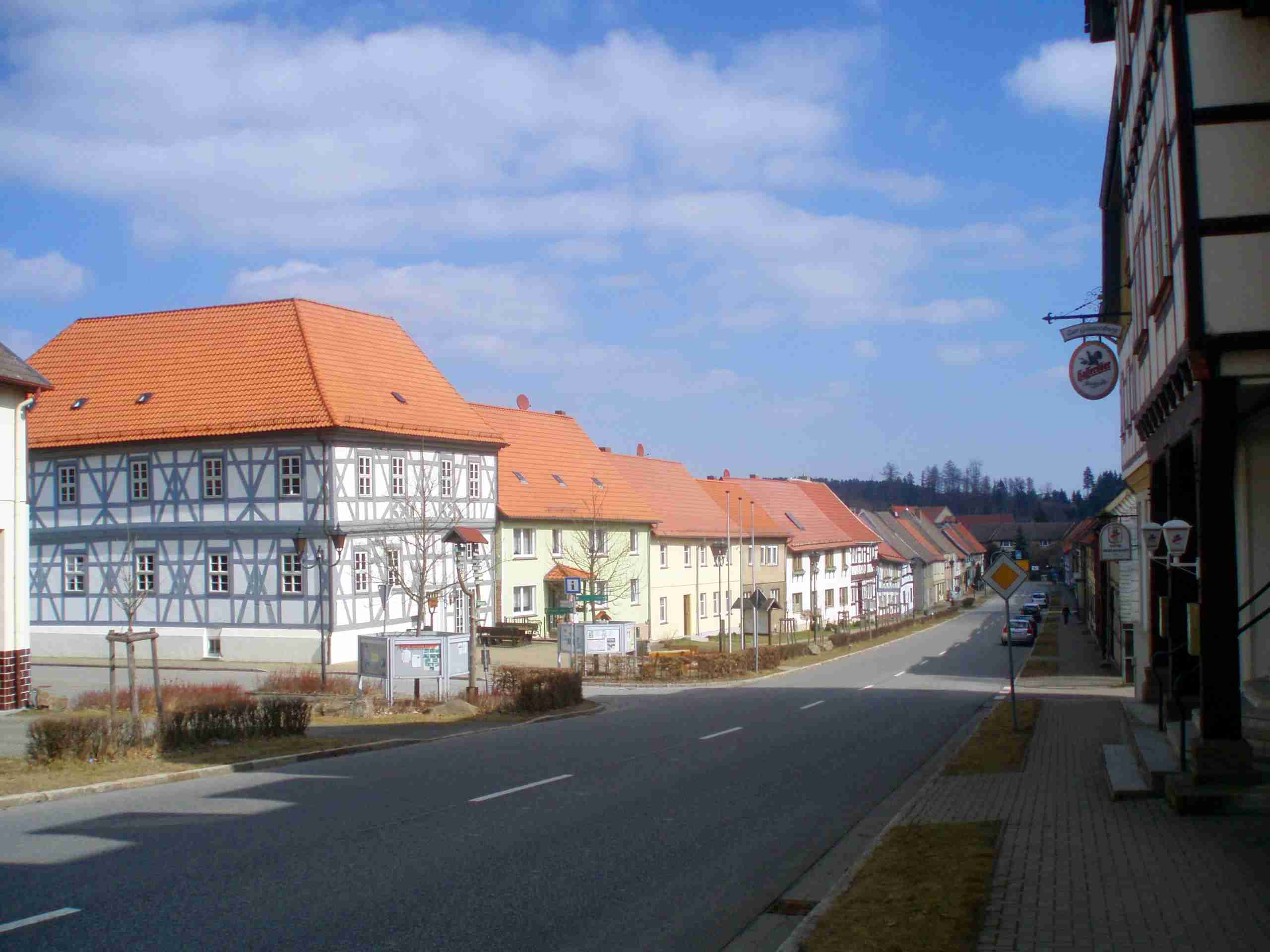
Main street

Nearby Güntersburg Castle was first mentioned in 1326, then located on important trade routes through the Harz mountains. The settlement of Güntersberge itself was documented as a town in 1437. Temporarily given in pawn to the Landgraves of Thuringia and the comital House of Stolberg, it was purchased by the Ascanian prince George III of Anhalt-Dessau in 1546. From 1603 the area belonged the Principality of Anhalt-Bernburg, from 1635 to 1709 to Anhalt-Harzgerode. Güntersberge remained part of the Free State of Anhalt until 1945.

After World War II the eastern Harz region was located in the Soviet occupation zone and became part of East Germany in 1949. From 1952 to 1990, it was part of the Bezirk Halle of East Germany. Güntersberge was the site of a large summer camp run by the Ernst Thälmann Pioneer Organisation.

== Places of interest ==
- Ruins of Güntersburg Castle
- Memorial erected by the Union of Persecutees of the Nazi Regime, dedicated to the Soviet victims of Nazi forced labour
- Mousetrap and Curiosity Museum
- School Museum - a school in Güntersberge since the Protestant Reformation
