= Siptenfelde =

- Stadtteil of Harzgerode
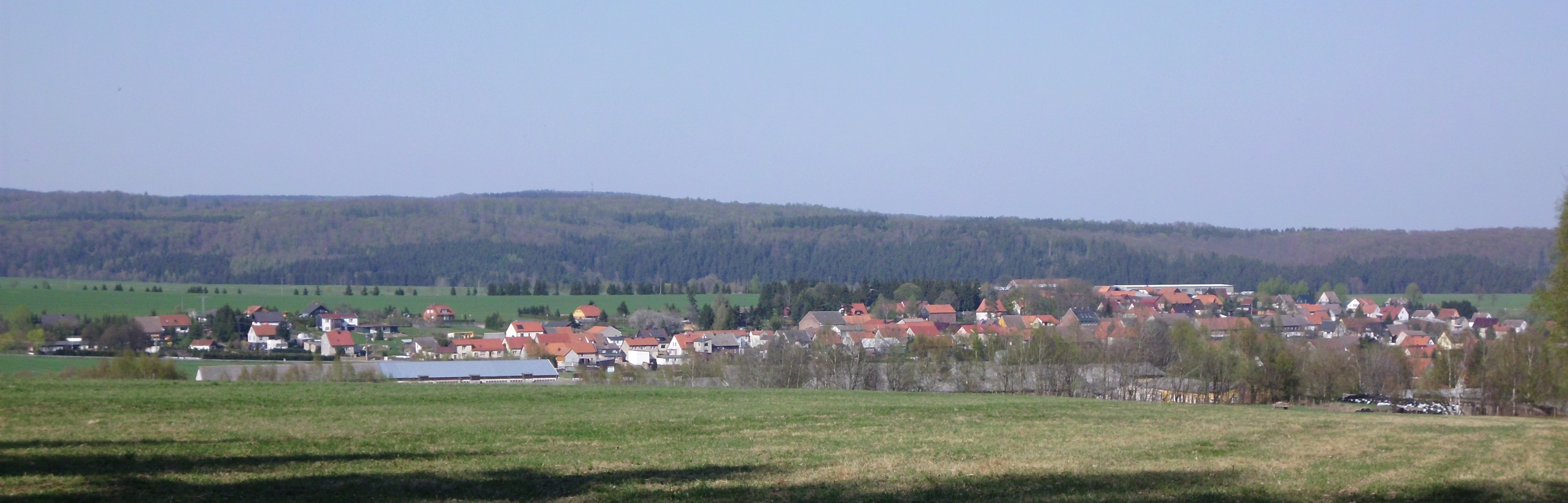
- The view of Siptenfelde, town of Harzgerode

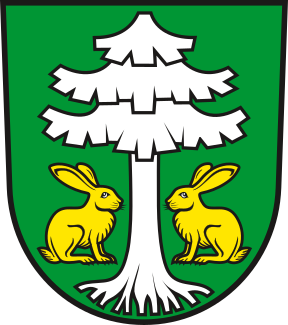
- Coat of arms
- Interactive map of Siptenfelde
- Location within Germany Location within Saxony-Anhalt
- Coordinates: 51°38′N 11°3′E
- Country: Germany
- State: Saxony-Anhalt
- District: Harz
- Town: Harzgerode

Area
  - Total: 12.70 km^{2} (4.90 sq mi)
- Elevation: 406 m (1,332 ft)

Population (2011)
  - Total: 560
  - Density: 44/km^{2} (110/sq mi)
- Time zone: UTC+01:00 (CET)
  - Summer (DST): UTC+02:00 (CEST)
- Postal codes: 06507
- Dialling codes: 039488
- Vehicle registration: HZ
- Website: www.siptenfelde.de

Siptenfelde is a village and a former municipality in the district of Harz, Saxony-Anhalt, Germany. Since 1 August 2009, it is part of the town Harzgerode.
