= Alexisbad =

Borough of Harzgerode in Saxony-Anhalt, Germany

- Borough of Harzgerode
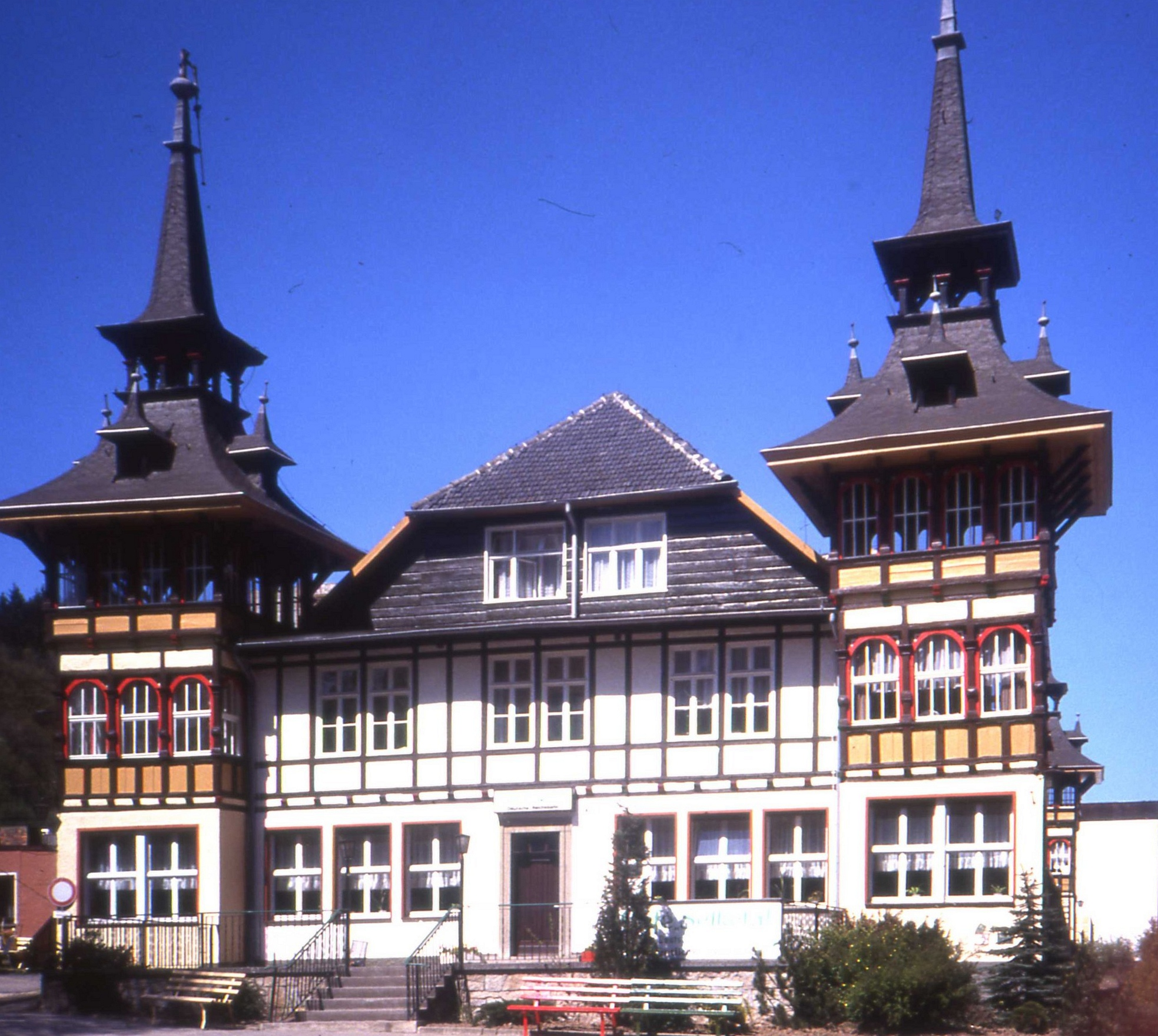
- Former Reichsbahn recreation home
- Interactive map of Alexisbad
- Location within Germany Location within Saxony-Anhalt
- Coordinates: 51°38′58″N 11°7′1″E
- Country: Germany
- State: Saxony-Anhalt
- District: Harz
- Town: Harzgerode
- Elevation: 310 m (1,020 ft)

Population
  - Total: 52
- Time zone: UTC+01:00 (CET)
  - Summer (DST): UTC+02:00 (CEST)
- Postal codes: 06493
- Dialling codes: 039484
- Vehicle registration: HZ, QLB

Alexisbad is a small spa town, part of Harzgerode in the district of Harz, Saxony-Anhalt, Germany.

== Geography ==
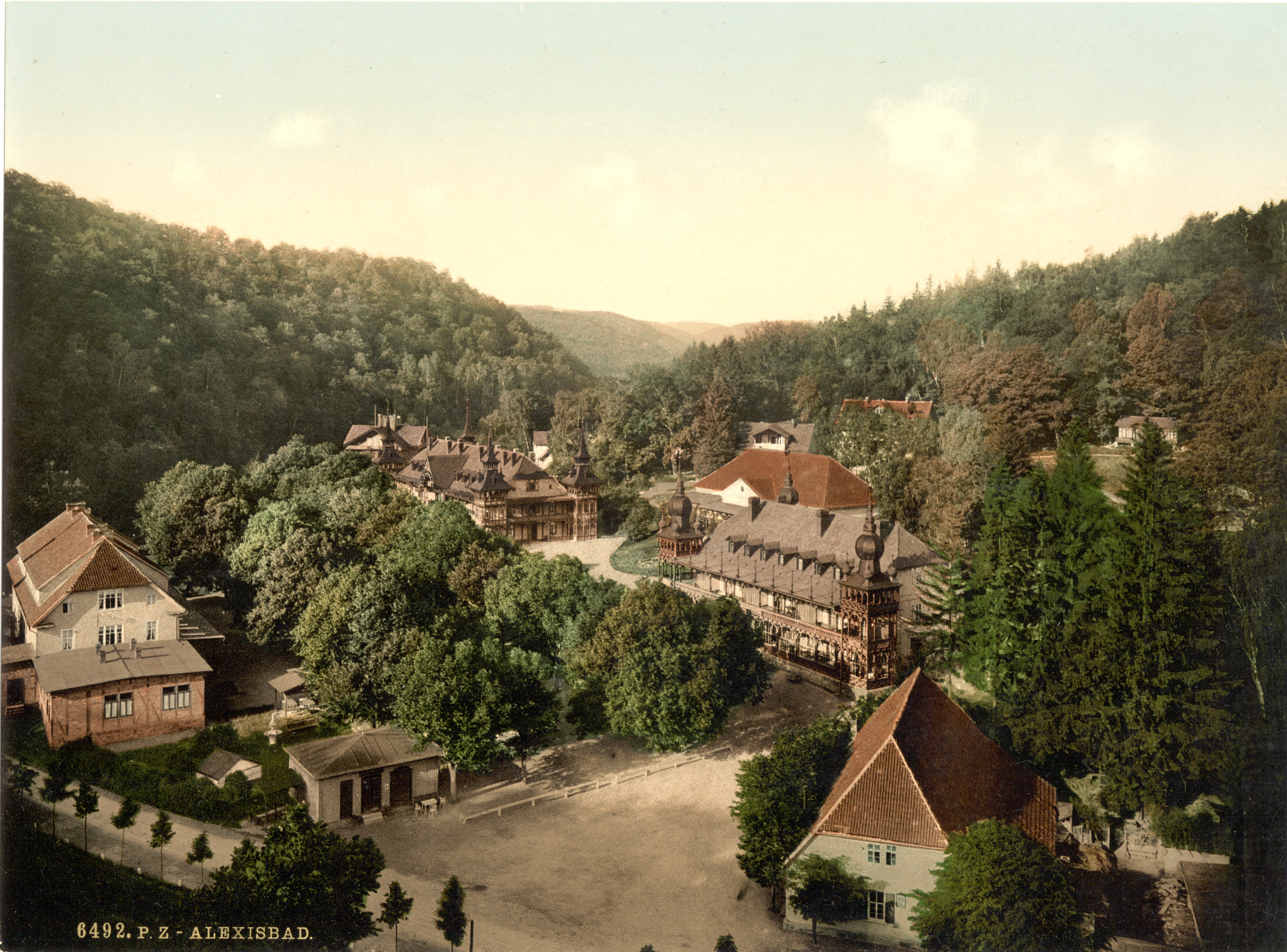
Alexisbad about 1900

Alexisbad is located about 2 km (1.2 mi) northwest of the Harzgerode town centre on the Bundesstrasse 185 road to Ballenstedt. It is situated in the valley of the Selke river and its Schwefelbach and Friedenstalbach tributaries, in the lower eastern outskirts of the Harz mountain range, about 310 m (1,020 ft) above sea level. The settlement is surrounded by the Harz/Saxony-Anhalt Nature Park.

In earlier years, the spa town was known for its medicinal waters, of which the Alexisbrunnen, an iron-rich spring, is used for drinking water, while the Selkebrunnen supplies the baths. It has its own station on the narrow gauge steam railway section from Gernrode to Harzgerode, which is part of the historic Selke Valley Railway network operated by the Harz Narrow Gauge Railways company.

== History ==
The Selke valley is the site of the former Benedictine Hagenenrod Abbey, a filial monastery of Nienburg Abbey founded in 975. The Nienburg monks obtained market, minting and customs rights by King Otto III in 993. About 1000, the local Schwabengau counts of Ballenstedt, progenitors of the noble House of Ascania, served as Vogt protectors. Though the estates were placed under protection by Pope Alexander III in 1179, the monks later resettled to Naumburg and the premises, devastated during the German Peasants' War in 1525, decayed.

When the Ascanian Princes of Anhalt had the region developed as a mining area, a gallery was excavated for pyrite in 1692. Mining was resumed under Prince Frederick Albert of Anhalt-Bernburg from 1759 onwards, and sulfur was produced by destillation. The healing properties of the waters were first examined in 1766, however, initial attempts to establish a medical care and spa business were not successful.

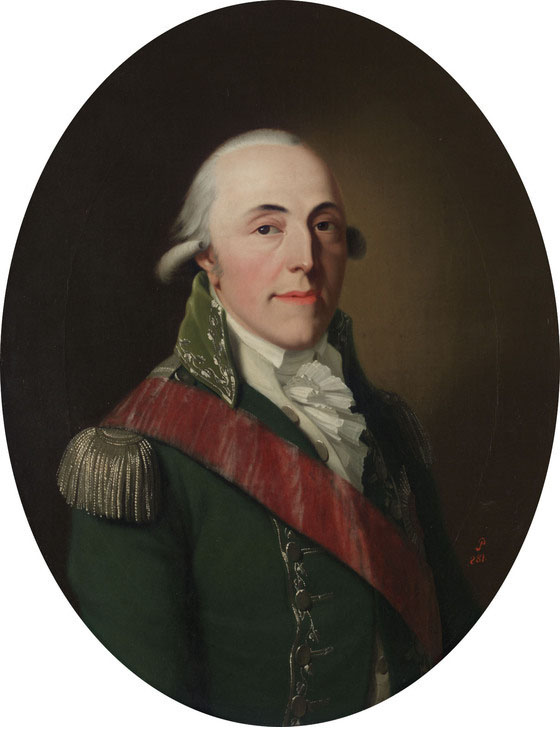
Alexius of Anhalt, c. 1795

In 1809 Prince Frederick Albert's successor Duke Alexius Frederick Christian Anhalt-Bernburg had the waters again analyzed by the physician Karl Ferdinand von Graefe, who stressed the content of iodine, fluorine, and iron. A spa town including a casino was laid out according to plans by Carl Friedrich Schinkel, who also designed a tea house for Alexius' consort Marie Friederike, which later was turned into a Protestant chapel at the behest of Duchess Friederike of Anhalt-Bernburg.

Alexisbad soon became a fashionable health resort. Among the first guests was the composer Carl Maria von Weber in 1820. On 12 May 1856, the Verein Deutscher Ingenieure (Association of German Engineers, VDI) was founded here during a vacation of several academics.

== Tourism ==
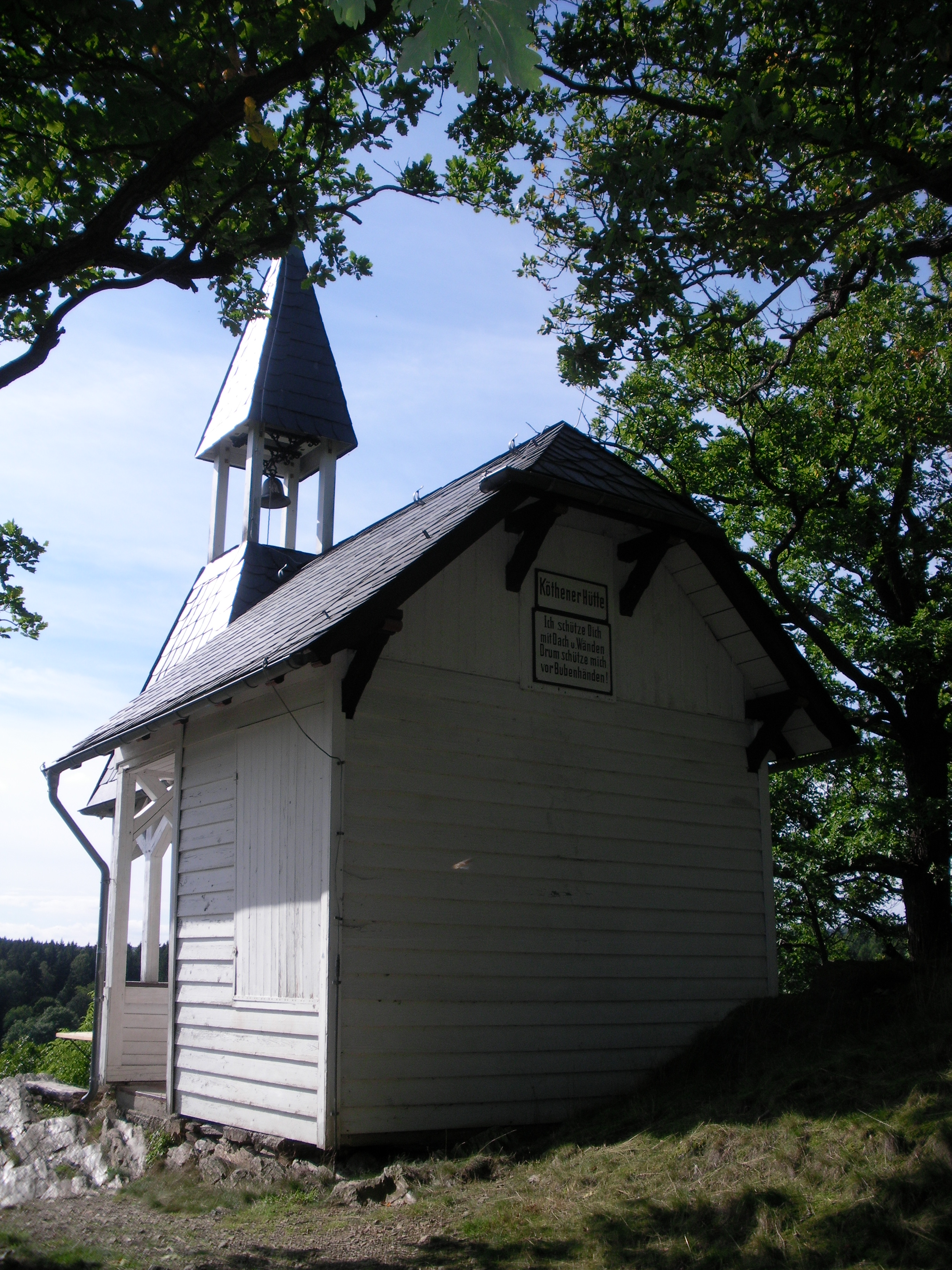
Köthen Hut

The economy of the village is dominated by tourism. There are several hotels, pensions and restaurants. Hiking trails lead into the attractive local countryside. Typical destinations are:

- The Betrothal Urn (Verlobungsurne) - a monument at a good viewing point above the town (checkpoint 177 in the Harzer Wandernadel hiking system).
- The Luisentempel, a monopteros built in 1823 on a prominent rock above Alexisbad and named after Princess Luise of Anhalt-Bernburg (1799–1882)
- The Köthen Hut (Köthener Hütte), checkpoint 195 in the Harzer Wandernadel hiking system. The hut may be reached on a steep zigzag path that runs from the B 185 road below where there is a small, unsigned, parking bay. Otherwise walkers need to start from Alexisbad, Harzgerode or Mägdesprung.

== Notable people ==
The author Walter Kempowski (1929–2007) spent his summer holidays in Alexisbad in 1939. He perpetuated the resort as Sophienbad in his 1971 autobiographic novel An Ordinary Youth.
