= Königerode =

- Stadtteil of Harzgerode
- Interactive map of Königerode
- Location within Germany Location within Saxony-Anhalt
- Coordinates: 51°36′6″N 11°12′14″E
- Country: Germany
- State: Saxony-Anhalt
- District: Harz
- Town: Harzgerode

Area
  - Total: 14.64 km^{2} (5.65 sq mi)
- Elevation: 370 m (1,210 ft)

Population (2019-12-31)
  - Total: 729
  - Density: 49.8/km^{2} (129/sq mi)
- Time zone: UTC+01:00 (CET)
  - Summer (DST): UTC+02:00 (CEST)
- Postal codes: 06493
- Dialling codes: 039484
- Vehicle registration: HZ

Königerode is a village and a former municipality in the district of Harz, Saxony-Anhalt, Germany. Since 1 August 2009, it is part of the town Harzgerode.
