= Neudorf, Saxony-Anhalt =

Neudorf
- Stadtteil of Harzgerode
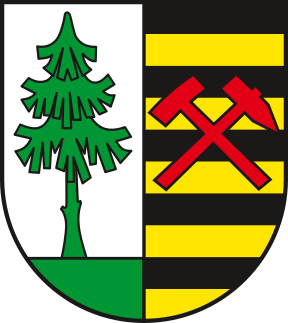
- Coat of arms
- Interactive map of Neudorf
- Location within Germany Location within Saxony-Anhalt
- Coordinates: 51°36′N 11°7′E
- Country: Germany
- State: Saxony-Anhalt
- District: Harz
- Town: Harzgerode

Area
  - Total: 14 km^{2} (5.4 sq mi)
- Elevation: 440 m (1,440 ft)

Population (2019-12-31)
  - Total: 672
  - Density: 48/km^{2} (120/sq mi)
- Time zone: UTC+01:00 (CET)
  - Summer (DST): UTC+02:00 (CEST)
- Postal codes: 06493
- Dialling codes: 039484
- Vehicle registration: HZ

Neudorf (German pronunciation: [ˈnɔʏdɔʁf], lit. 'New Village') is a village and a former municipality in the district of Harz, in Saxony-Anhalt, Germany.

On 1 September 2010 Neudorf was incorporated into Harzgerode.

== Tourism ==
There is a checkpoint (no. 193) for hikers by the Stahlquelle which is part of the Harzer Wandernadel system.
