= Dankerode =

- Stadtteil of Harzgerode
- Interactive map of Dankerode
- Location within Germany Location within Saxony-Anhalt
- Coordinates: 51°35′29″N 11°8′18″E
- Country: Germany
- State: Saxony-Anhalt
- District: Harz
- Town: Harzgerode

Area
  - Total: 11.81 km^{2} (4.56 sq mi)
- Elevation: 420 m (1,380 ft)

Population (2019-12-31)
  - Total: 672
  - Density: 56.9/km^{2} (147/sq mi)
- Time zone: UTC+01:00 (CET)
  - Summer (DST): UTC+02:00 (CEST)
- Postal codes: 06493
- Dialling codes: 039484
- Vehicle registration: QLB

Dankerode is a village and a former municipality in the district of Harz, Saxony-Anhalt, Germany. Since 1 August 2009, it is part of the town Harzgerode. It lies in the Unterharz, the eastern region of the Harz mountains, at an elevation of 420 m above the valley of the Wipper and has over 1000 years of rich history.
