= Harzgerode =

- Town
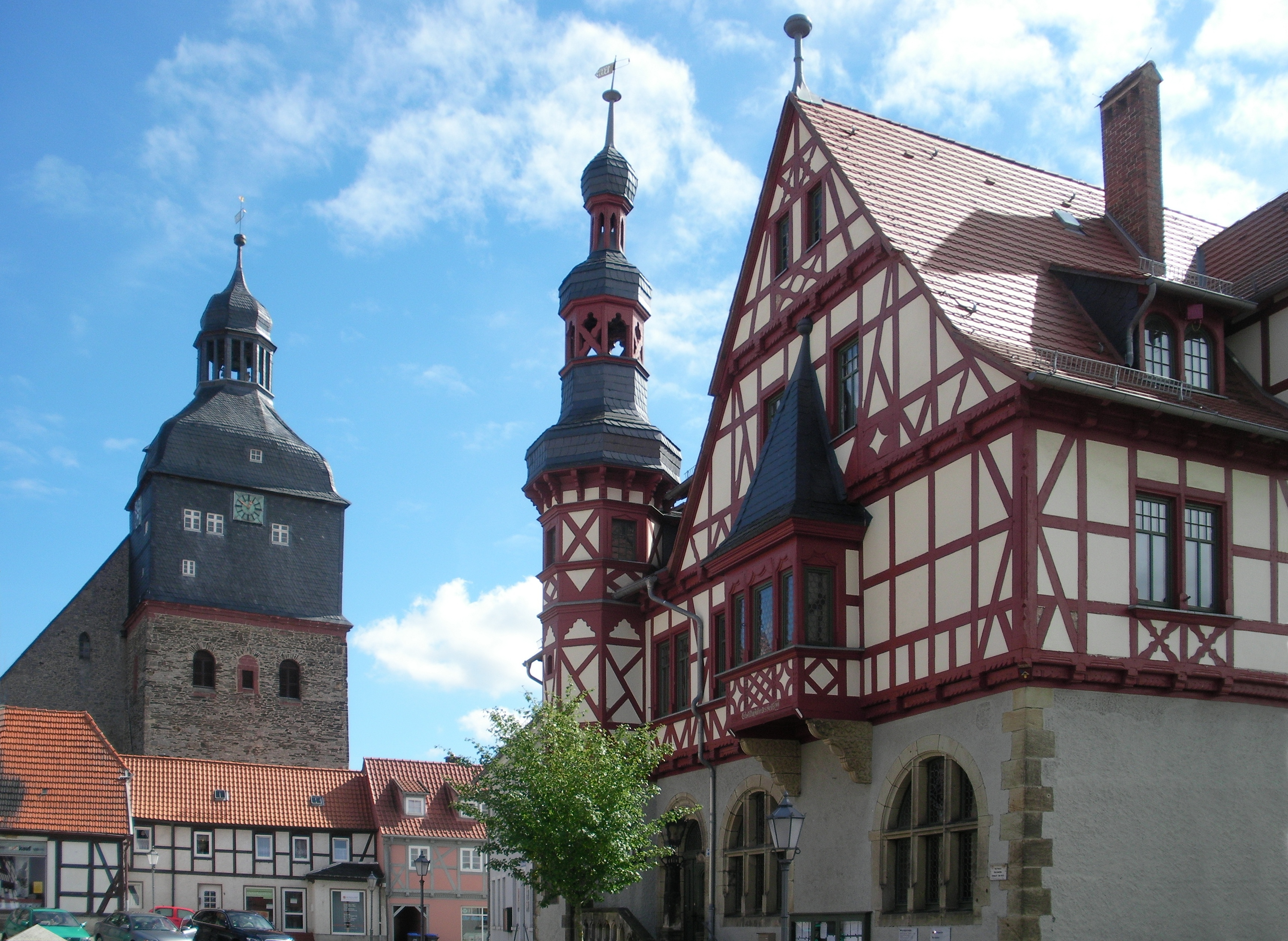
- Town hall and St Mary's Church

- Coat of arms

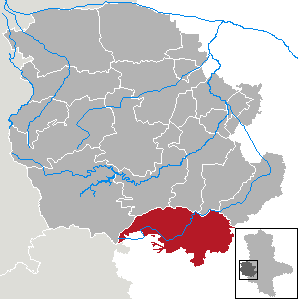
- Location of Harzgerode within Harz district
- Interactive map of Harzgerode
- Location within Germany Location within Saxony-Anhalt
- Coordinates: 51°38′32″N 11°8′39″E
- Country: Germany
- State: Saxony-Anhalt
- District: Harz

Government
  - Mayor (2023–30): Marcus Weise (CDU)

Area
  - Total: 164.68 km^{2} (63.58 sq mi)
- Elevation: 400 m (1,300 ft)

Population (2025-12-31)
  - Total: 7,185
  - Density: 43.63/km^{2} (113.0/sq mi)
- Time zone: UTC+01:00 (CET)
  - Summer (DST): UTC+02:00 (CEST)
- Postal codes: 06493
- Dialling codes: 039484
- Vehicle registration: HZ
- Website: www.harzgerode.de

Harzgerode (German pronunciation: [haːɐ̯tsɡəˈʁoːdə]) is a town in the district of Harz in Saxony-Anhalt, Germany.

== Geography ==
Harzgerode lies in the lower eastern part of the Harz mountain range on the Selke River, south of Quedlinburg. It is connected to Gernrode and Quedlinburg via Alexisbad by a narrow gauge railway called the Selke Valley Railway (Selketalbahn).

The municipal area comprises the following 8 localities (Ortschaften), some of which consist of several divisions (Ortsteile):

- Dankerode
- Güntersberge (incl. Bärenrode and Friedrichshöhe)
- Harzgerode (incl. Alexisbad, Mägdesprung and Silberhütte)
- Königerode
- Neudorf
- Schielo
- Siptenfelde
- Straßberg

On 1 August 2009 the towns of Güntersberge and Harzgerode together with the municipalities of Dankerode, Königerode, Schielo, Siptenfelde and Straßberg became part of the new town of Harzgerode. On 1 September 2010 Neudorf was also incorporated.

== History ==
The settlement in the medieval Duchy of Saxony was first mentioned in connection with the Benedictine abbey of Hagenenrod in the Selke valley founded in 975, to which King Otto III granted market, minting and customs rights in 993. The following year the place was mentioned as Hazacanroth, when the king granted the citizens of Quedlinburg market rights.

About 1000, the local Schwabengau counts of Ballenstedt, progenitors of the noble House of Ascania, served as Vogt protectors of the Hagenrode monastery dedicated to Saint John the Baptist. The abbey already lost its minting rights in 1035, when Emperor Conrad II had the mint relocated to Nienburg and though its estates were placed under protection by Pope Alexander III in 1179, the monks later left for the episcopal town of Naumburg. Devastated during the German Peasants' War in 1525, the monastery's local possessions fell to the Ascanian Princes of Anhalt while the abbey's buildings decayed.

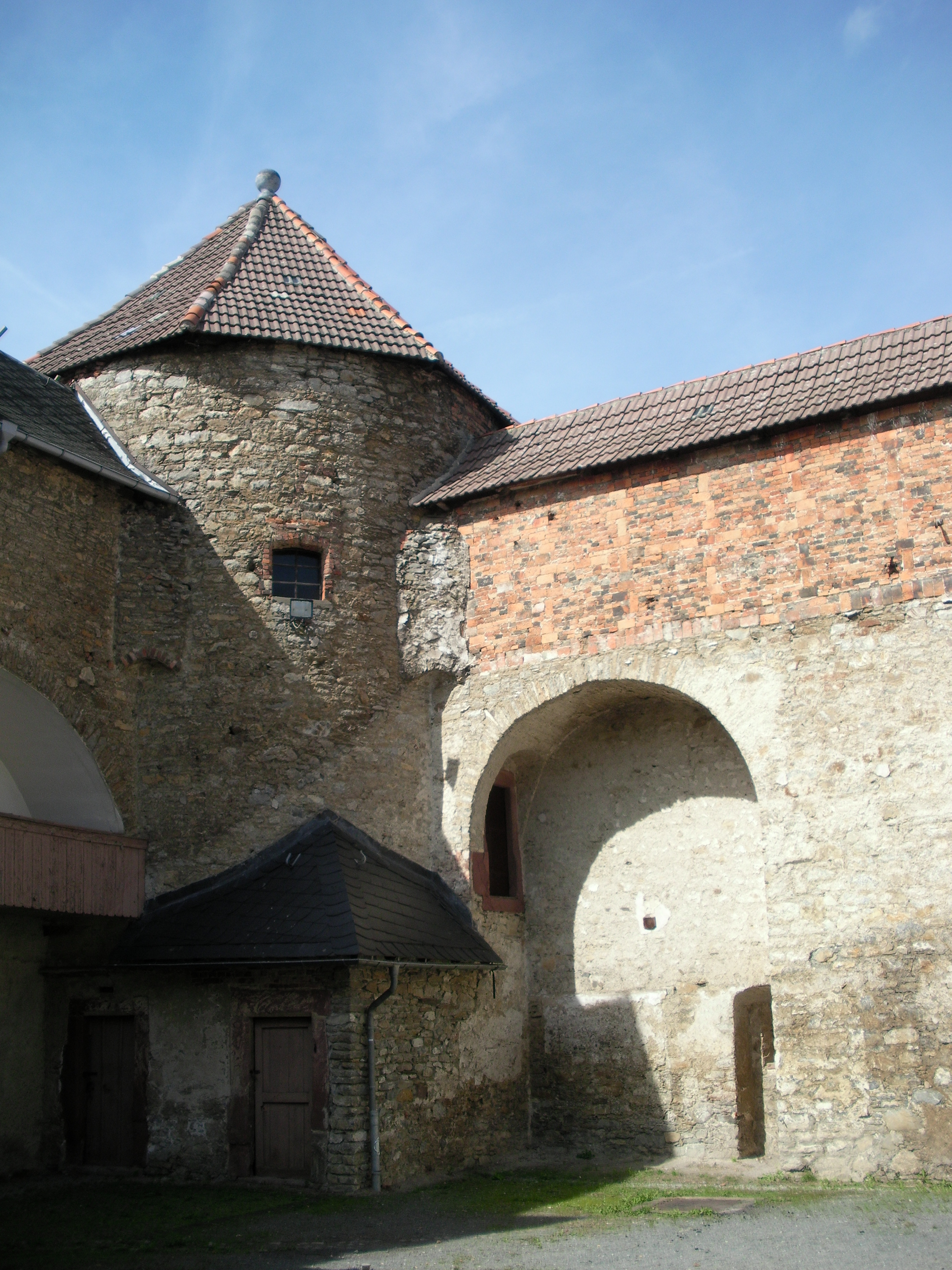
Harzgerode Castle, courtyard

Upon a 1252 division of the Principality of Anhalt, Harzgerode had become part of the Anhalt-Bernburg principality. The Harzgerode town privileges were renewed in 1338. Due to its protected location, the town did not suffer from many military conflicts, but it was repeatedly devastated by fire. Before 1503 there was a great fire; in 1635 (on Midsummer's Day) every building in the town was razed with the exception of seven houses. On 30 June 1722 again 42 houses burned down; on 23 October 1817 52 houses were razed.

Temporarily given in pawn to the Counts of Stolberg, the rule was again assumed by the Anhalt princes in 1535. Harzgerode became the administrative centre of the double Amt of Harzgerode and Güntersberge, both vested with town privileges. In 1635 Prince Frederick made Harzgerode Castle, built in the mid 16th century, the residence of his Anhalt-Harzgerode principality.

For centuries, the surrounding Harz mountains were a significant mining area, mainly for fluorite and silver, such as in the preserved Glasebach Pit near the village of Straßberg. Likewise, the Lower Harz Pond and Ditch System is a historic example of mining water resource management, similar to the Upper Harz Water Regale. Harzgerode Castle, as well as Heinrichsberg Castle located near the town quarter of Mägdesprung, mark the historic significance of the region. Nearby are the ruins of Anhalt Castle which gave the entire state its name.

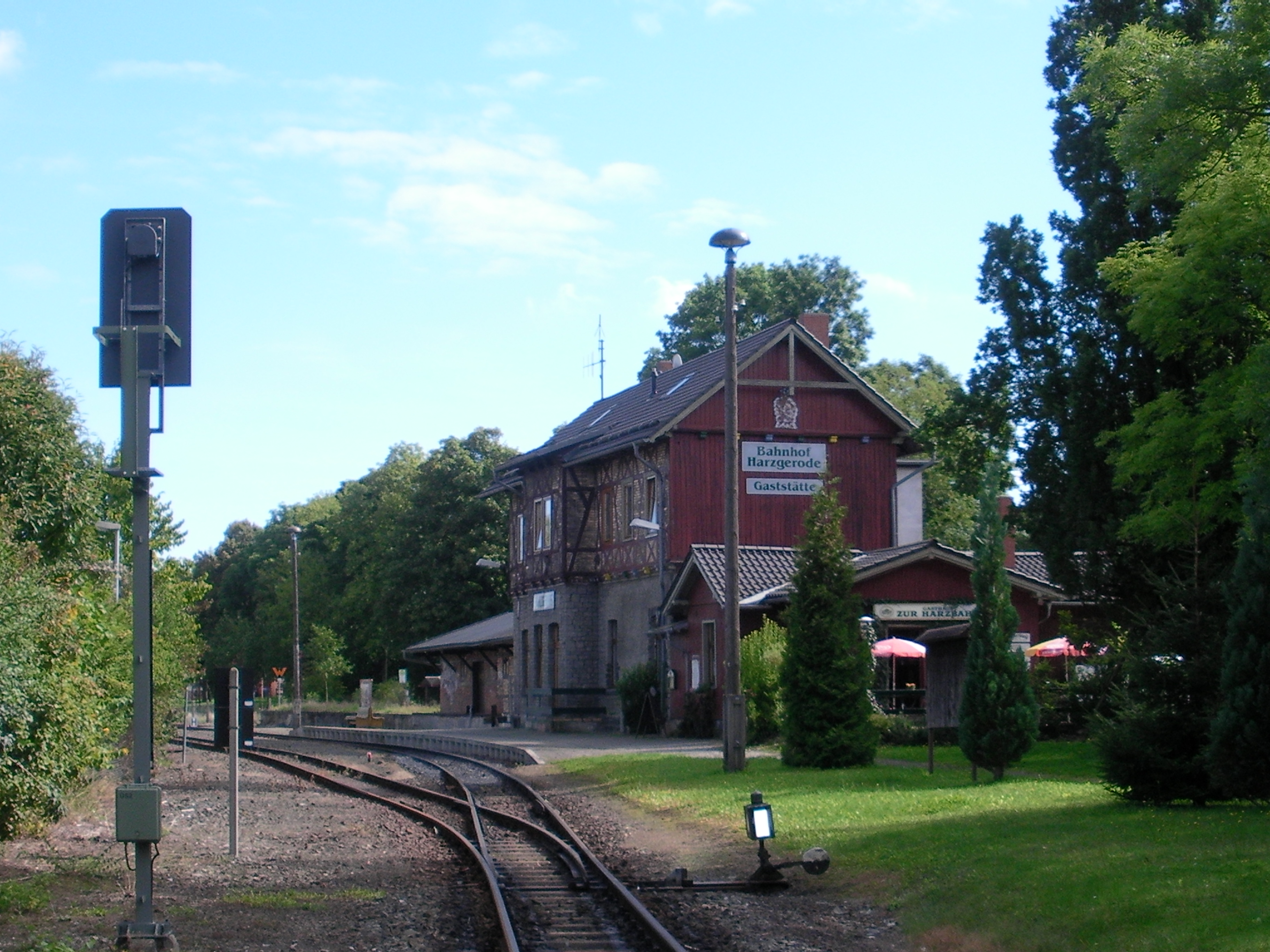
Harzgerode station

== Climate ==
Climate data for Harzgerode (1991–2020 normals)
Month	Jan	Feb	Mar	Apr	May	Jun	Jul	Aug	Sep	Oct	Nov	Dec	Year
Mean daily maximum °C (°F)	2.2 (36.0)	3.4 (38.1)	7.0 (44.6)	12.4 (54.3)	16.5 (61.7)	20.0 (68.0)	22.5 (72.5)	22.2 (72.0)	17.5 (63.5)	12.2 (54.0)	6.5 (43.7)	3.1 (37.6)	12.4 (54.3)
Daily mean °C (°F)	−0.4 (31.3)	0.2 (32.4)	2.9 (37.2)	7.3 (45.1)	11.4 (52.5)	14.7 (58.5)	16.8 (62.2)	16.6 (61.9)	12.8 (55.0)	8.0 (46.4)	4.0 (39.2)	0.7 (33.3)	8.1 (46.6)
Mean daily minimum °C (°F)	−3.0 (26.6)	−3.1 (26.4)	−1.1 (30.0)	1.5 (34.7)	5.3 (41.5)	8.6 (47.5)	10.8 (51.4)	10.5 (50.9)	7.4 (45.3)	4.4 (39.9)	0.8 (33.4)	−1.9 (28.6)	3.5 (38.3)
Average precipitation mm (inches)	46.9 (1.85)	28.8 (1.13)	41.7 (1.64)	33.9 (1.33)	62.5 (2.46)	51.1 (2.01)	68.5 (2.70)	50.9 (2.00)	56.6 (2.23)	45.7 (1.80)	47.8 (1.88)	44.5 (1.75)	601.9 (23.70)
Average precipitation days (≥ 1.0 mm)	17.8	14.0	15.5	12.6	13.0	13.6	15.0	13.3	12.9	15.4	16.7	18.0	180.1
Average relative humidity (%)	88.1	84.0	80.7	74.1	74.7	74.6	72.9	73.7	78.9	85.3	89.0	89.2	80.4
Mean monthly sunshine hours	49.0	73.5	137.6	204.4	250.8	240.4	247.5	225.0	156.4	104.9	51.3	37.4	1,778.4
Source: World Meteorological Organization

== Politics ==
Seats in the municipal council (Stadtrat) as of 2014 local elections:

- Christian Democratic Union of Germany (CDU): 8
- Free Voters: 8
- Social Democratic Party of Germany (SPD): 2
- The Left: 2

== Twin towns ==
Harzgerode is twinned with:

- Leval, Nord, France, since 1999
- Bockenem, Germany (Güntersberge)
- Straßberg, Plauen, Germany (Straßberg)

== Notable people ==
- Prince John George I of Anhalt-Dessau (1567–1618)
- Veronika Schmidt (born 1952), cross-country skier
