= Roßla-Südharz =

Former municipal association in Germany

Coordinates: 51°28′N 11°05′E

Roßla-Südharz was a Verwaltungsgemeinschaft ("collective municipality") in the Mansfeld-Südharz district, in Saxony-Anhalt, Germany. It was situated in the southern part of the Harz, west of Sangerhausen. The seat of the Verwaltungsgemeinschaft was in Roßla. It was disbanded on 1 January 2010.

The Verwaltungsgemeinschaft Roßla-Südharz consisted of the following municipalities:

- Bennungen
- Breitenstein
- Breitungen
- Dietersdorf
- Drebsdorf
- Hainrode
- Hayn
- Kleinleinungen
- Questenberg
- Roßla
- Rottleberode
- Schwenda
- Stolberg
- Uftrungen
- Wickerode
