= Sangerhausen (district) =

Coordinates: 51.4667°N 11.3000°E

- District
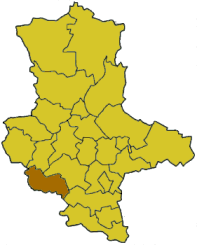
- Country: Germany
- State: Saxony-Anhalt
- Disbanded: 2007-07-01
- Capital: Sangerhausen

Area
  - Total: 689.73 km^{2} (266.31 sq mi)

Population (2002)
  - Total: 66,134
  - Density: 95.884/km^{2} (248.34/sq mi)
- Time zone: UTC+01:00 (CET)
  - Summer (DST): UTC+02:00 (CEST)
- Vehicle registration: SGH

Sangerhausen was a district (Kreis) in the south of Saxony-Anhalt, Germany. Neighboring districts were (from north clockwise) Quedlinburg, Mansfelder Land, Merseburg-Querfurt, and the districts Kyffhäuserkreis and Nordhausen in Thuringia. Sangerhausen was merged on July 1, 2007, with Mansfelder Land into the new district Mansfeld-Südharz as part of a reform.

== History ==
The district was created on October 1, 1816, after Sachsen-Weißenfels became part of Prussia in 1815. In 1945 the Amt Allstedt was added to the district, in 1952 some municipalities were removed from the district, which decreased the area from 773 to 689 km^{2}. In the communal reform of 1994 the district remained unchanged.

== Geography ==
The highest elevation of the district is the Großer Auerberg near Stolberg with 579 m above sea level, the lowest elevation with 119.8 m is near Curtsgehofenmühle southwest of Allstedt.

== Coat of arms ==
The triangle in the coat of arms symbolizes the hills of used ore left over from the mining industry in the district. Inside the triangle is a rose, which stands for the famous rosarium in the city Sangerhausen. Below the triangle are two hooks, which are taken from the coat of arms of the city Sangerhausen.

== Towns and municipalities ==
Towns
1. Sangerhausen
Verwaltungsgemeinschaften
1. Allstedt-Kaltenborn (incl. town Allstedt)
2. Goldene Aue (incl. town Kelbra)
3. Roßla-Südharz (incl. town Stolberg)
