= Bauerngraben (Harz) =

- Hungersee
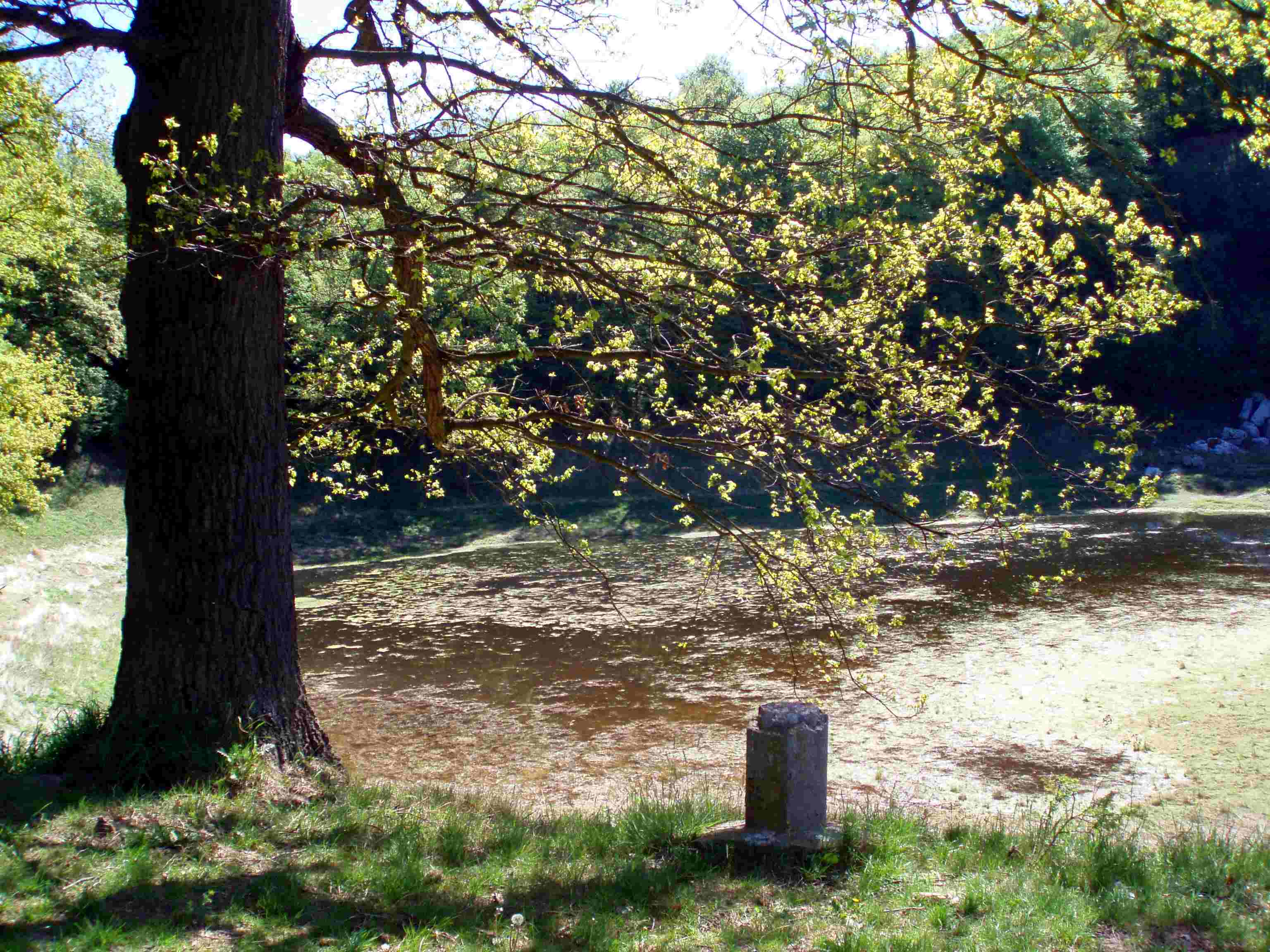
- View of the lake

- Location within Germany
- Location: Saxony-Anhalt, Germany
- Coordinates: 51.488371°N 11.076643°E
- Type: lake
- Max. length: 350 metres (1,150 ft)
- Max. width: 100 metres (330 ft)

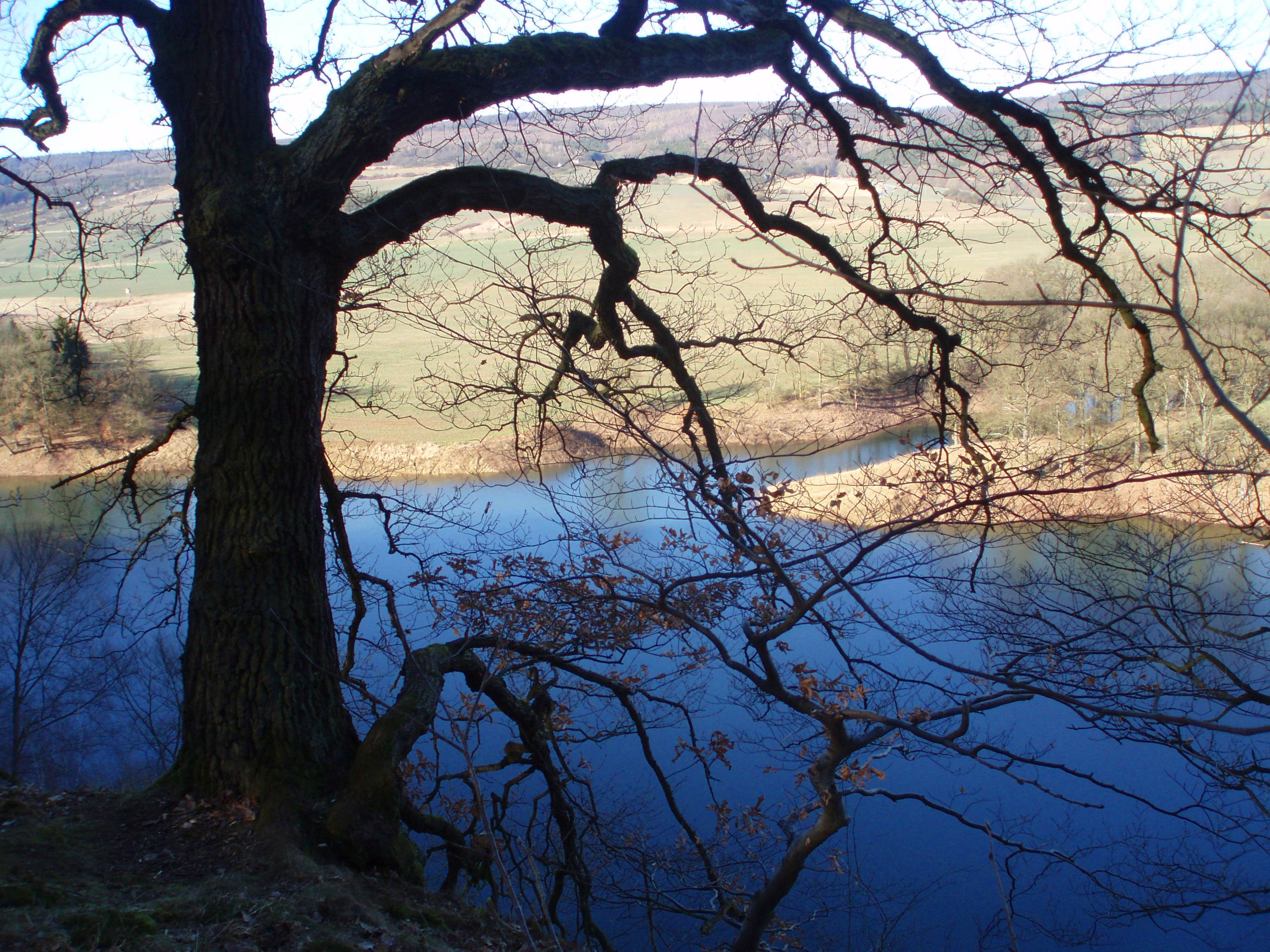
Lake at high water

The Bauerngraben, also called the Hungersee, is a lake in Germany between Breitungen, Agnesdorf and Roßla in the South Harz. It is an intermittent lake of about 350 metres (1,150 ft) in length and 100 metres (330 ft) in width, into which the Glasebach disappears. A feature of this lake is its sudden disappearance from time to time, when the outlet opens due to the removal of material. The lake can then become dry for a long period. The Bauerngraben ist part of the Gipskarstlandschaft Questenberg nature reserve.

The Karst Trail runs through the area. The Bauerngraben is a popular destination for day trippers and is easy to reach due to the nearby car park and easy footpaths. There is a checkpoint (no. 213) in the Harzer Wandernadel hiking system by the lake.
