= Großer Auerberg =

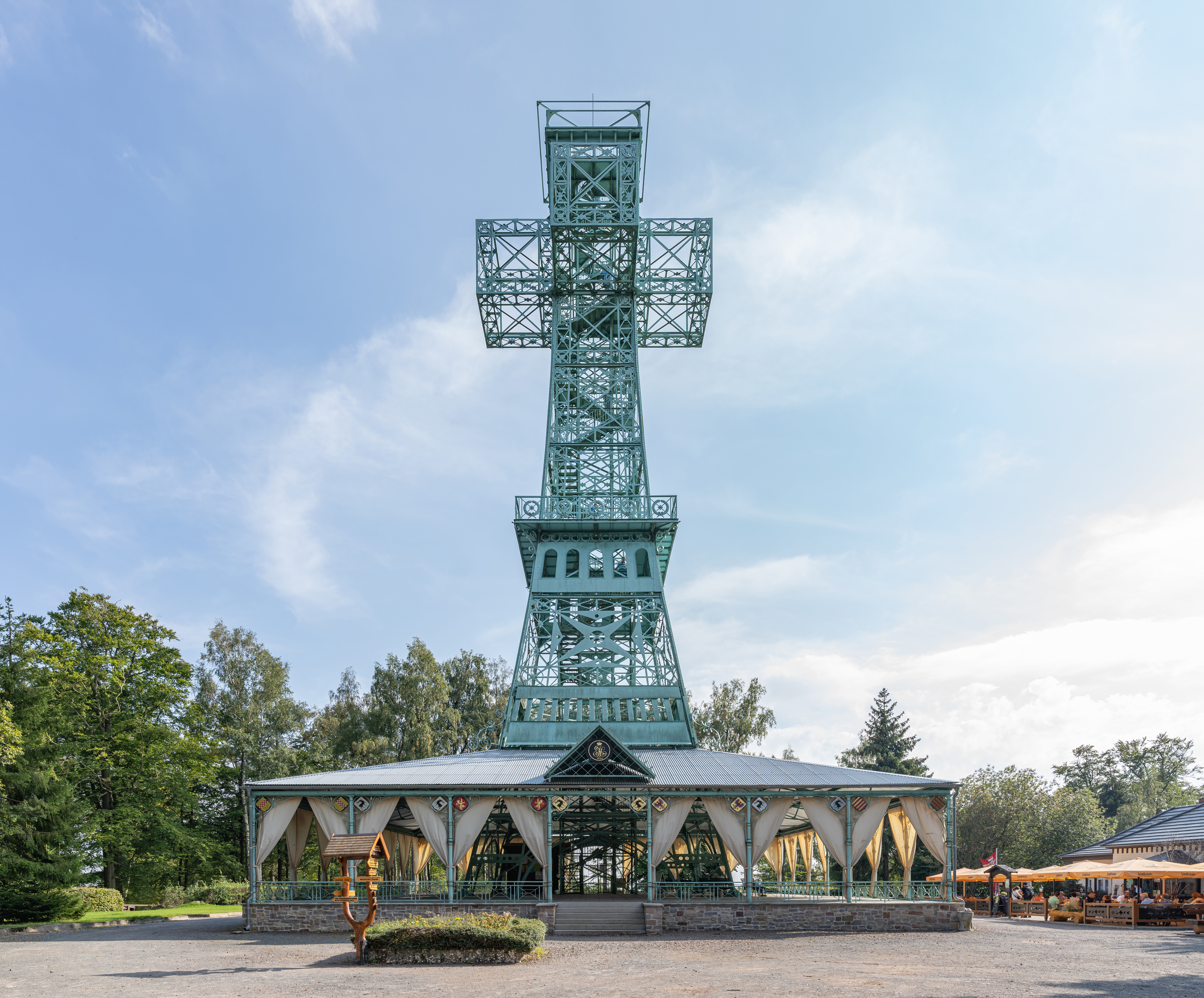
- The Josephskreuz on the Josephshöhe

Highest point
- Elevation: 580 m (1,900 ft)
- Coordinates: 51°35′06″N 11°00′14″E

Geography
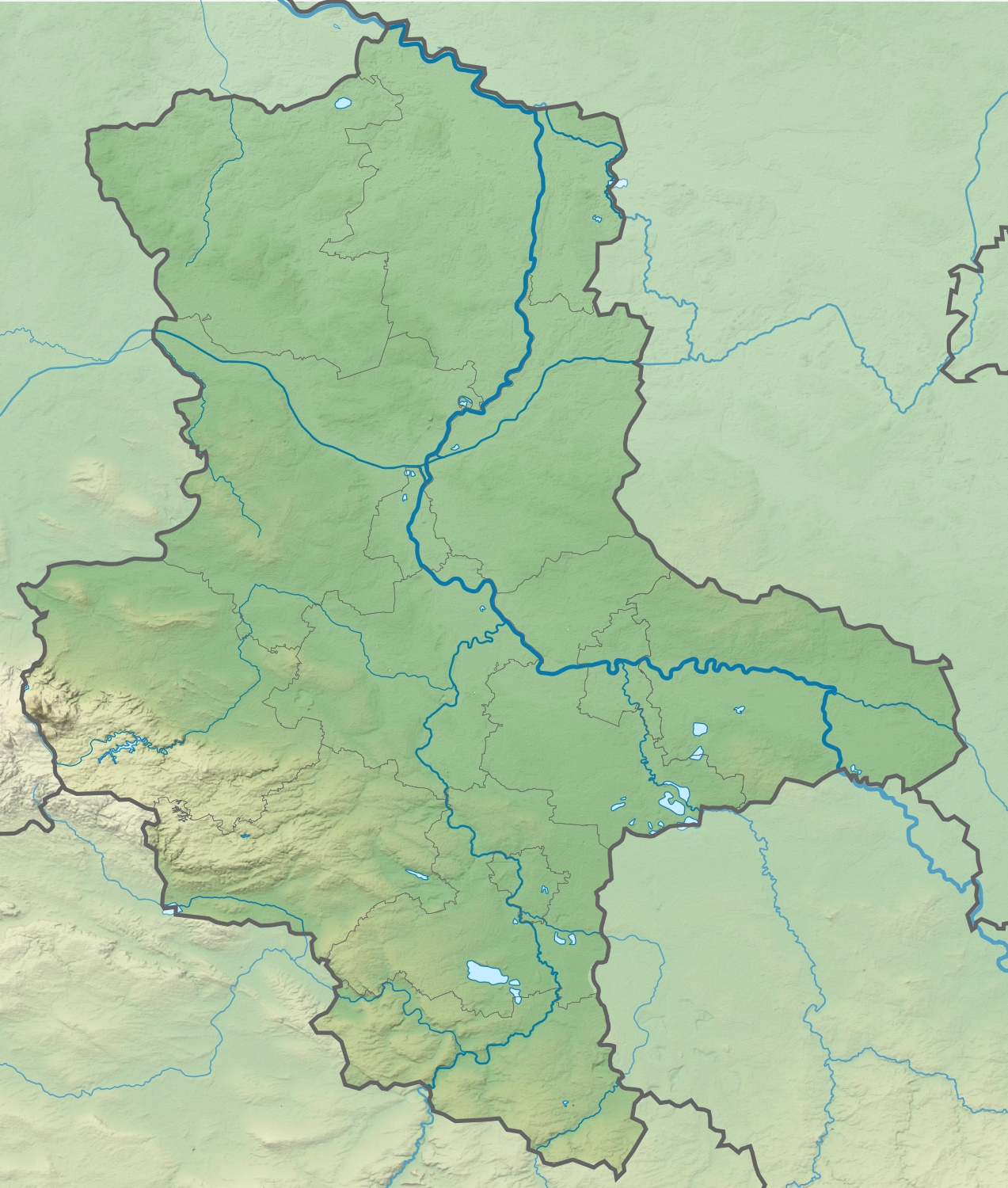
- Location within Saxony-Anhalt
- Location: Saxony-Anhalt, Germany
- Parent range: Harz Mountains

Geology
- Mountain type: double summit
- Rock type: Granite

The Große Auerberg is a hill, 580 metres (1,900 ft) high, in the eastern Harz in the district of Mansfeld-Südharz in the German state of Saxony-Anhalt. It is a so-called double peak with summits that are 580.4 metres high (Großer Auerberg) and 580.3 metres high (Josephshöhe), which are about 470 metres apart.

== Location ==
The Große Auerberg rises within the Harz/Saxony-Anhalt Nature Park between Straßberg to the northeast, Hayn to the southeast, Schwenda to the south, Stolberg to the southwest and Breitenstein to the northwest. East of the hill is the source of the Thyra tributary, the Krummschlachtbach, west of the Thyra headstream, the Kleine Wilde.

== Geology ==
The Auerberg is made of rhyolite (quartz porphyry), a volcanic rock. In the fine crystalline matrix (Grundmasse) are deposits of "Stolberg Diamonds" (Stolberger Diamanten), up to 13 mm thick, crystallised-out quartz and orthoclase grains.

== Joseph's Cross ==
On the slightly lower peak, the so-called Josephshöhe ("Joseph's Height"), the 38 metre high Josephskreuz ("Joseph's Cross") was built in 1896. This is a steel lattice observation tower in the shape of a double cross. It is also checkpoint no. 215 in the Harzer Wandernadel.

== Transport and walking ==
The Landesstraße 236 runs past the Großer Auerberg to the north and east. Formerly known as the Harzschützenstraße, it forms the border between Thuringia and Saxony. The summit may be reached in about 15 minutes walk from the car park near the hamlet of Auerberg or from the car park of the nature resort of Schindelbruch. The footpath from the Schindelbruch to the Cross is called the Straße der Lieder ("Road of Songs"). Along the path are 16 boards with the text of German folk songs.
