= Heimkehle =

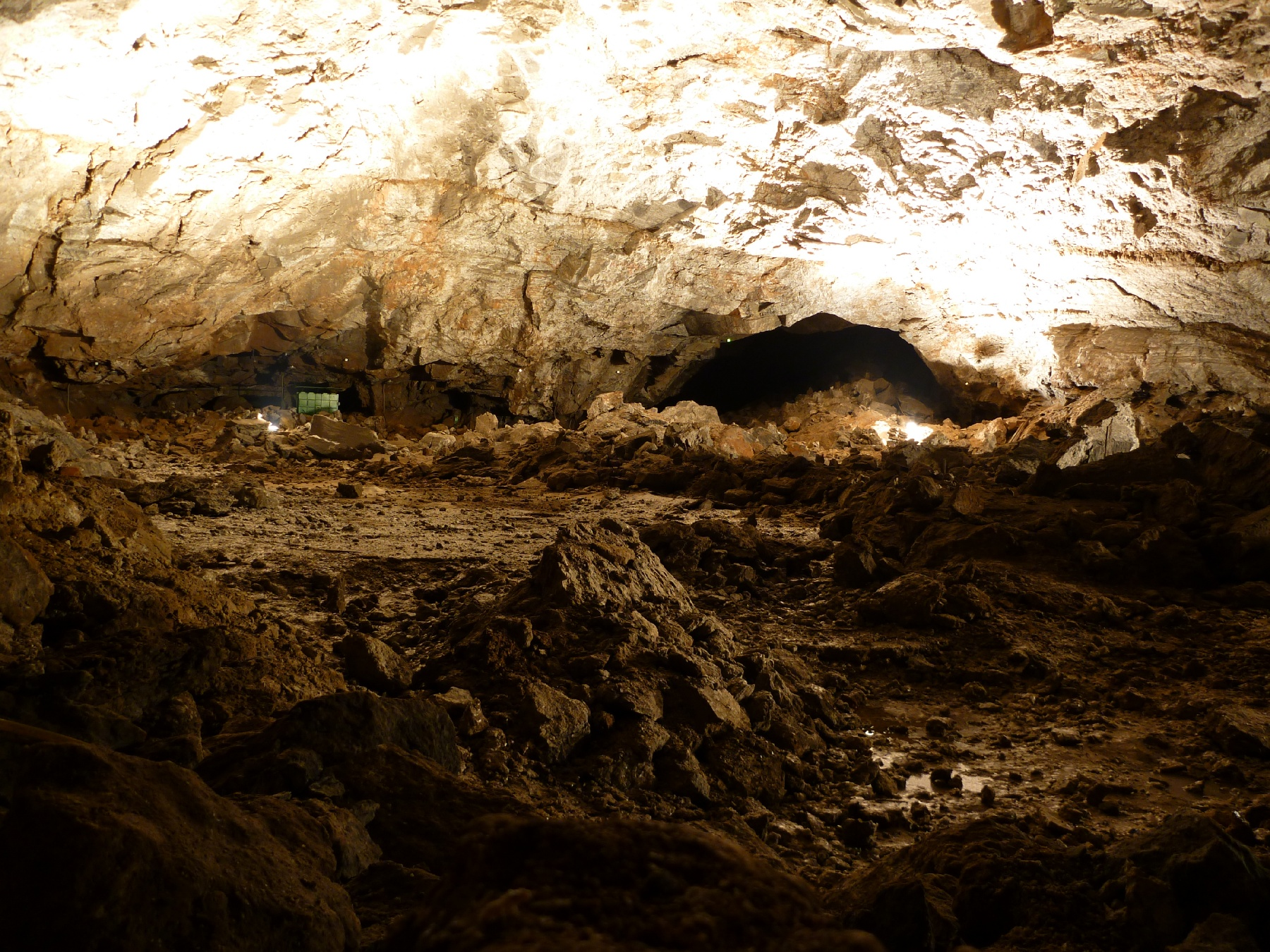
- View of the Great Cathedral in the Heimkehle (2009)
- Interactive map of Heimkehle
- Location: Uftrungen, Germany
- Coordinates: 51°29′50″N 10°57′18″E
- Length: 2000 metres (show cave is 750 metres)
- Discovery: 1357
- Geology: karst cave
- Show cave opened: 1920
- Lighting: electric (since 1920)
- Website: www.hoehle-heimkehle.de

The Heimkehle is one of two great gypsum caves in Germany that are accessible as show caves. It lies on the southern edge of the Harz Mountains between Rottleberode and Uftrungen, east of Nordhausen, right on the state border between Thuringia and Saxony-Anhalt. The cave may be visited as part of a 45-minute-long guided tour.

== Description ==
The Heimkehle is a gypsum cave with a length of about 2000 metres, 750 metres of which are normally part of the guided tours. However, due to construction work at present (2008) only 600 metres are accessible. The largest cavern is 65 metres long, 65 metres wide and 22 metres high. As a result of the high solubility of gypsum there has been intensive karstification and a resulting formation of voluminous cave systems. Because it is close to the water table many of the room are or were filled with water. The cave receives an average of 20,000 visitors a year.

== History ==
The Heimkehle was first mentioned in the records in 1357. In 1649 the Prince of Anhalt visited. But not until 1920 was the cave opened up by Theodor Wienrich who had electric lighting installed. On 12 September 1920 the show cave was opened. Because the largest part of the Heimkehle was covered at that time with a contiguous lake, it was negotiated in boats.

From 1944 the German Army turned the cave into a bombproof production site for the Dessau Junkers Factory, used to produce parts for the Ju 88 and other products. V-weapons were also supposed to have been produced here. Initially large parts of the lake were concreted over and three production halls and several tunnels built, of which the largest could even be used by lorries. The tunnels and access galleries were able to be cut in a relatively short time due to the softness of the gypsum. Prisoners from the Rottleberode satellite camp of the Mittelbau concentration camp were drafted in to man the underground facilities. Due to the brutality of the SS guards and the climatic conditions in the cave the death rate amongst the prisoners was very high. Towards the war's end the cave was evacuated and the prisoners were sent on to other work camps. A large number of them died as a result.

After the war the cave was considered a military installation by the Allies due to its production facilities. In 1946 they had all the access galleries blown up. The cave suffered heavy damage as a result of roof and side wall collapses. From 1953 the Heimkehle was opened up. New entry and exit galleries were driven and the structures that had not already been destroyed were removed. Hardly any traces of buildings may be seen in the cave today. The concreted lakes could not be uncovered because the thickness and quality of the concrete used by the Nazis did not allow it to be removed. More demolition work would have caused further destruction of the Heimkehle. So the cave may now be visited on foot. In 1954 it was re-opened as a show cave. In the small cathedral (Kleiner Dom), where there had also been production facilities, East German authorities built a memorial to the concentration camp inmates. In the Great Cathedral (Großer Dom), in which only a few traces of the production site can still be seen, a laser show was installed in 1990. The formal opening of the karst museum took place in 1979.

== Harzer Wandernadel ==
The cave is checkpoint no. 214 in the Harzer Wandernadel hiking system.

== See also ==
- List of show caves in Germany

== Sources ==
- Heimkehle at www.showcaves.com. Retrieved on 8 May 2010.
