= Friedrich August Wolf =

German philologist (1759–1824)

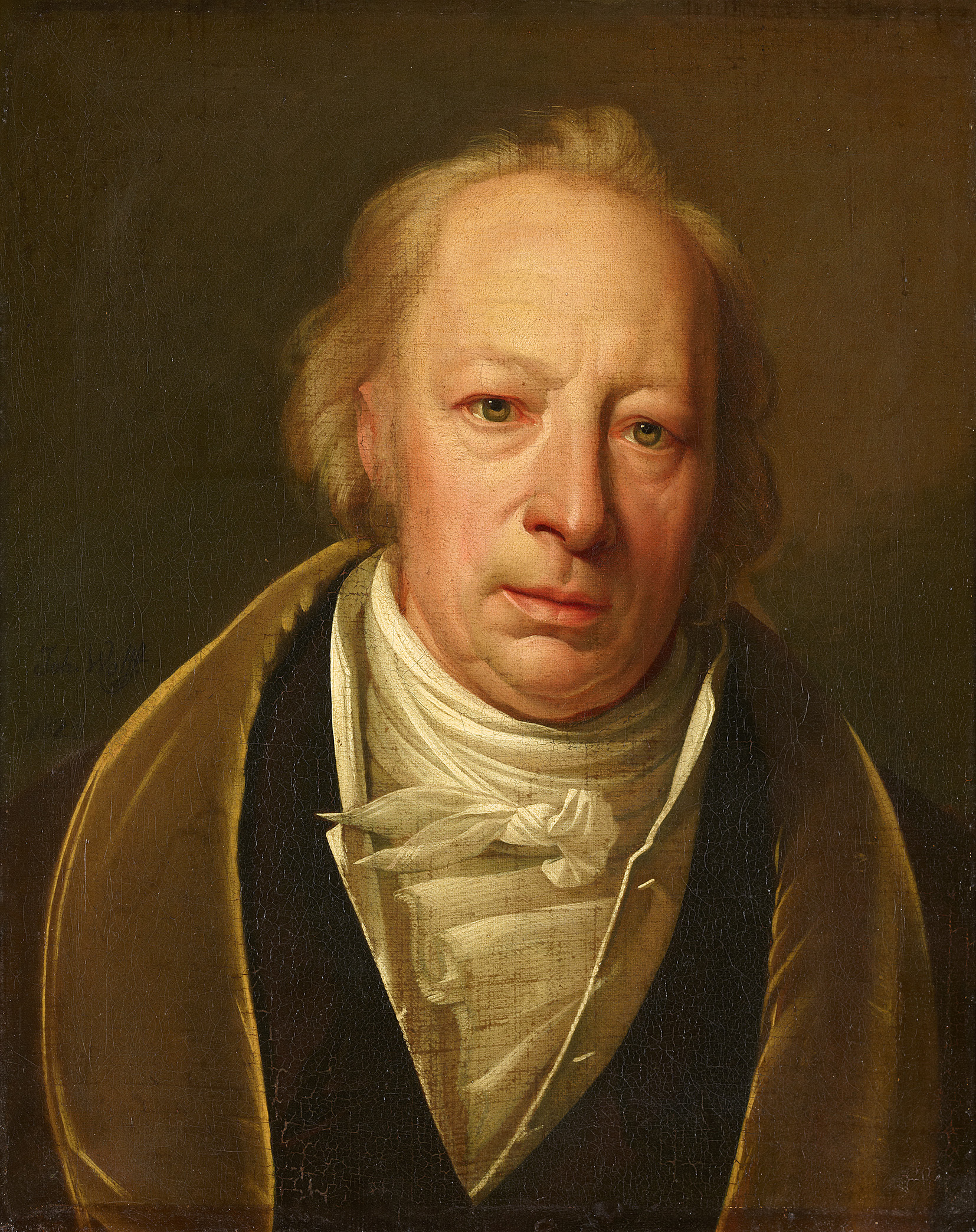
Portrait by Johann Eduard Wolff, 1823

Friedrich August Wolf (/ˈvɔːlf/; German: [vɔlf]; 15 February 1759 – 8 August 1824) was a German classicist who is considered the founder of classical and modern philology.

== Biography ==
Wolf was born in Hainrode, near Nordhausen. His father was the village schoolmaster and organist. In grammar school, he studied Latin and Greek as well as French, Italian, Spanish, and music.

In 1777, after two years of independent study, at the age of eighteen, Wolf went to the University of Göttingen. Legend has it that he chose to enroll in the department of "philology", despite the fact that the university had none. His enrollment was nonetheless accepted as submitted. At the time Christian Gottlob Heyne was a member of the faculty. Heyne excluded Wolf from his lectures, and criticized Wolf's views on Homer. Wolf was undeterred and pursued his studies through the university's library.

From 1779 to 1783, he taught at Ilfeld and Osterode. He published an edition of Plato's Symposium, and in 1783, he was awarded a chair at the University of Halle in Prussia.

It was in Halle (1783–1807), with the support of ministers serving under Frederick the Great, that Wolf first laid down the principles of the field he would call "Philology". He defined philology as the study of human nature as exhibited in antiquity. Its methods include the examination of the history, writing, art and other examples of ancient cultures. It combines the study of history and language, through interpretation, in which history and linguistics coalesce into an organic whole. This was the ideal of Wolf's philological seminarium at Halle.

During Wolf's time at Halle he published his commentary on the Leptines of Demosthenes (1789), which influenced his student August Böckh. He also published the Prolegomena ad Homerum (1795), which led to accusations of plagiarism by Heyne.

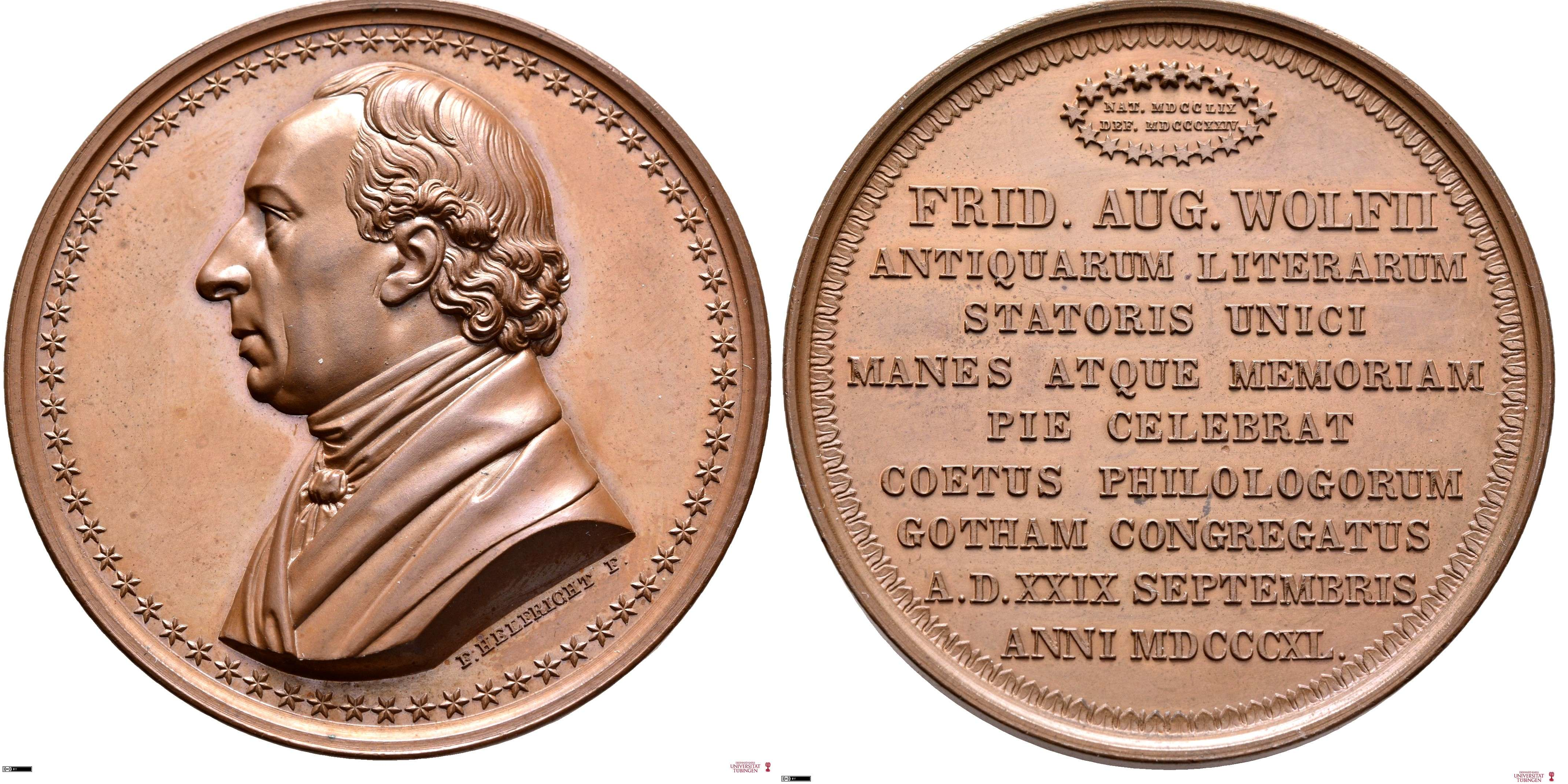
Medal Friedrich August Wolf (1840)

The Halle professorship ended after the French invasion of 1806. He relocated to Berlin, where he received assistance from Wilhelm von Humboldt. Later he once more took a professorship, but he no longer taught with his old success, and he wrote very little. His most finished work, the Darstellung der Alterthumswissenschaft, though published at Berlin (1807), belongs essentially to the Halle time.

Taking medical advice, Wolf travelled to the south but died on the road to Marseille, and was buried there. In 1840 a medal was struck in his honor.

== See also ==
- Hermeneutics
