= Johann Cyriacus Kieling =

Johann Cyriacus Kieling (Bennungen, 5 May 1670 – 1727) was a German composer who was Kantor at Brücken, then (from October 3, 1712) Kapellmeister at Stolberg (Harz). Little is known about Kieling. Compositions that have survived include the St Matthew Passion, a missa brevis (consisting of Kyrie and Gloria), four cantatas and ten motets.

== Recordings ==
- Matthäus-Passion Felix Heuser, Vincent Berger, Malwine Nicolaus, La Protezione della Musica, Jeroen Finke 2CD Arcantus, DDD, 2020
