= Karl Friedrich Wilhelm Wallroth =

German botanist (1792–1857)

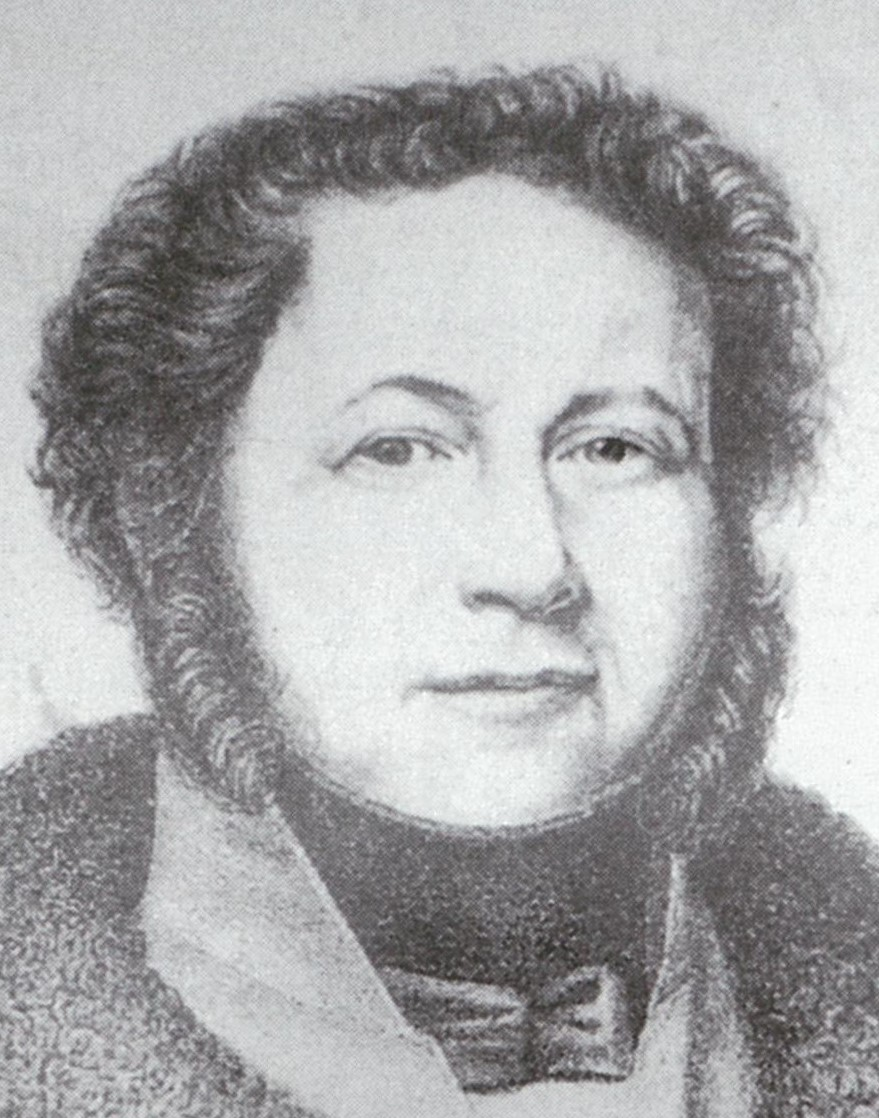
- Born: March 13, 1793; Breitenstein, Holy Roman Empire
- Died: March 22, 1857 (aged 64); Nordhausen, Thuringia, Kingdom of Prussia
- Scientific career
- Fields: Botany
- Author abbrev. (botany): Wallr.

Karl Friedrich Wilhelm Wallroth (13 March 1792 in Breitenstein – 22 March 1857 in Nordhausen) was a German botanist. His name is abbreviated Wallr. as a taxon authority.

He attended classes in medicine and botany at the University of Halle, afterwards continuing his studies in Göttingen, where he was a pupil of botanist Heinrich Adolf Schrader (1767-1836). In 1816 he obtained his medical doctorate at the University of Göttingen. In 1822, he was appointed district physician to the city of Nordhausen, where along with his duties as a doctor, he performed botanical research.

Among his writings were a treatise on cryptogams native to Germany, Flora Cryptogamica Germaniae (1831–33), and a study on the biology of lichens, titled Naturgeschichte der Flechten (1825 and 1827). Wallroth issued the exsiccata series Lichenes florae Germaniae exsiccati. Wallroth is credited for introducing the terms "homoiomerous" and "heteromerous" to explain two distinct forms of lichen thallus, as well as the terms "epiphloeodal", "hypophloeodal", and gonidium. Wallroth retired in 1855; he died two years later. His extensive herbarium was sold in several separate parts after his death. A large part went, together with some written materials, to the National Museum in Prague.

== See also ==
- Category:Taxa named by Karl Friedrich Wilhelm Wallroth
