= Glasebach (Bauerngraben) =

River in Germany

Coordinates: 51°29′16″N 11°04′26″E

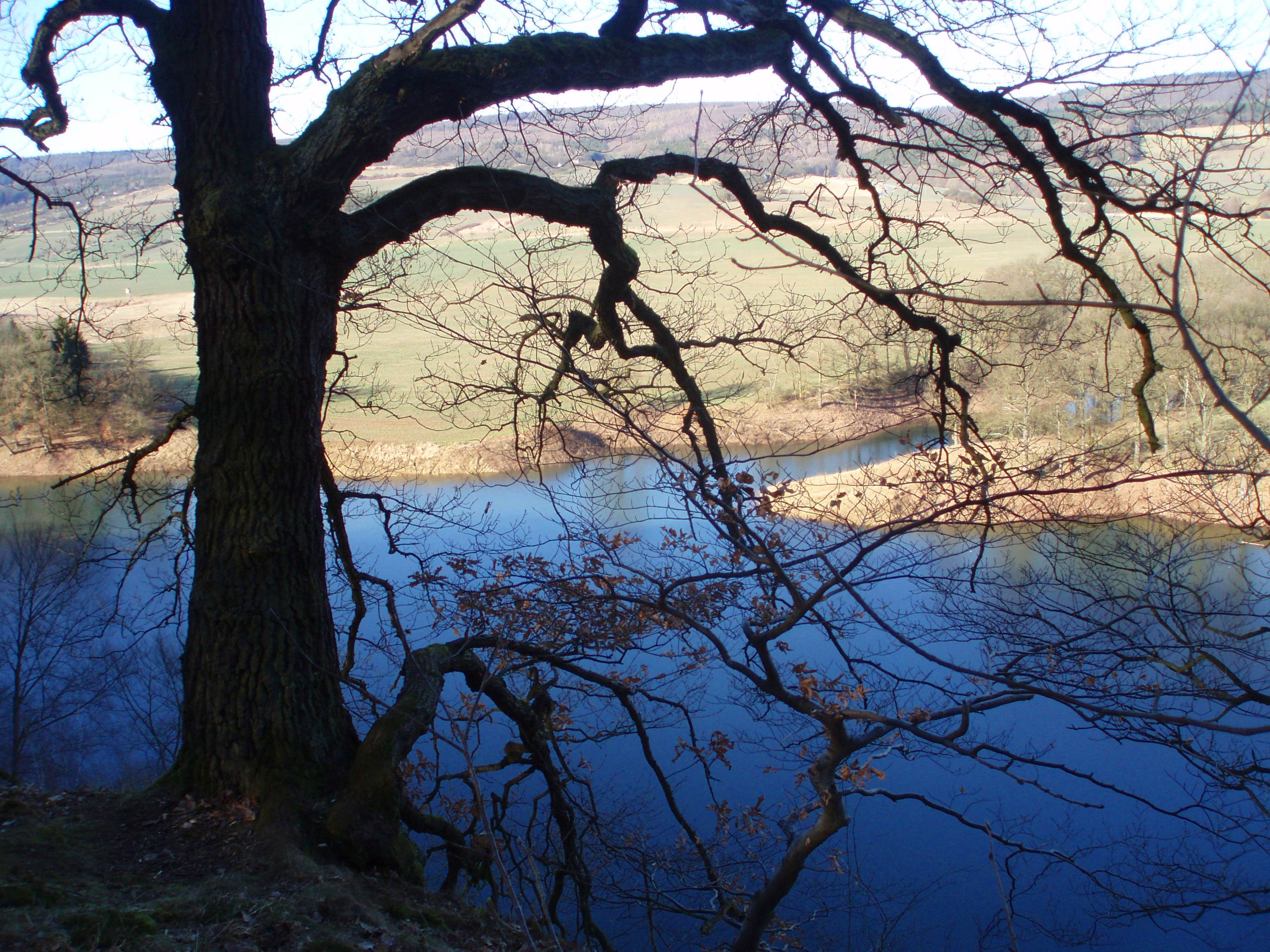

Location
- Country: Germany
- State: Saxony-Anhalt

The Glasebach is a stream of Saxony-Anhalt, Germany.

It rises near Dietersdorf east of the source region of the Nasse and south of the source region of the Schöneberger Wipper, a headstream of the Wipper. The Glasebach flows through the Borntal valley and has a tributary near Agnesdorf. Finally it flows through the Bauerngraben, where it seeps into the gypsum in the southern part of the lake basin.

== See also ==
- List of rivers of Saxony-Anhalt
