= Kreisreform Sachsen-Anhalt 2007 =

Kreisreform Sachsen-Anhalt 2007 (or Kreisgebietsreform 2007) is a law in Saxony-Anhalt, Germany that came into effect on July 1, 2007, which outlines a reform of the districts of Saxony-Anhalt. It reduced the districts from 24 to 14. Nine new districts were created by amalgamating existing districts, while the rural districts of Altmarkkreis Salzwedel and Stendal as well as the urban districts of Halle and Magdeburg were untouched.

== Districts (as of 1 July 2007) ==
Effects of the reform. Black lines indicate former districts.

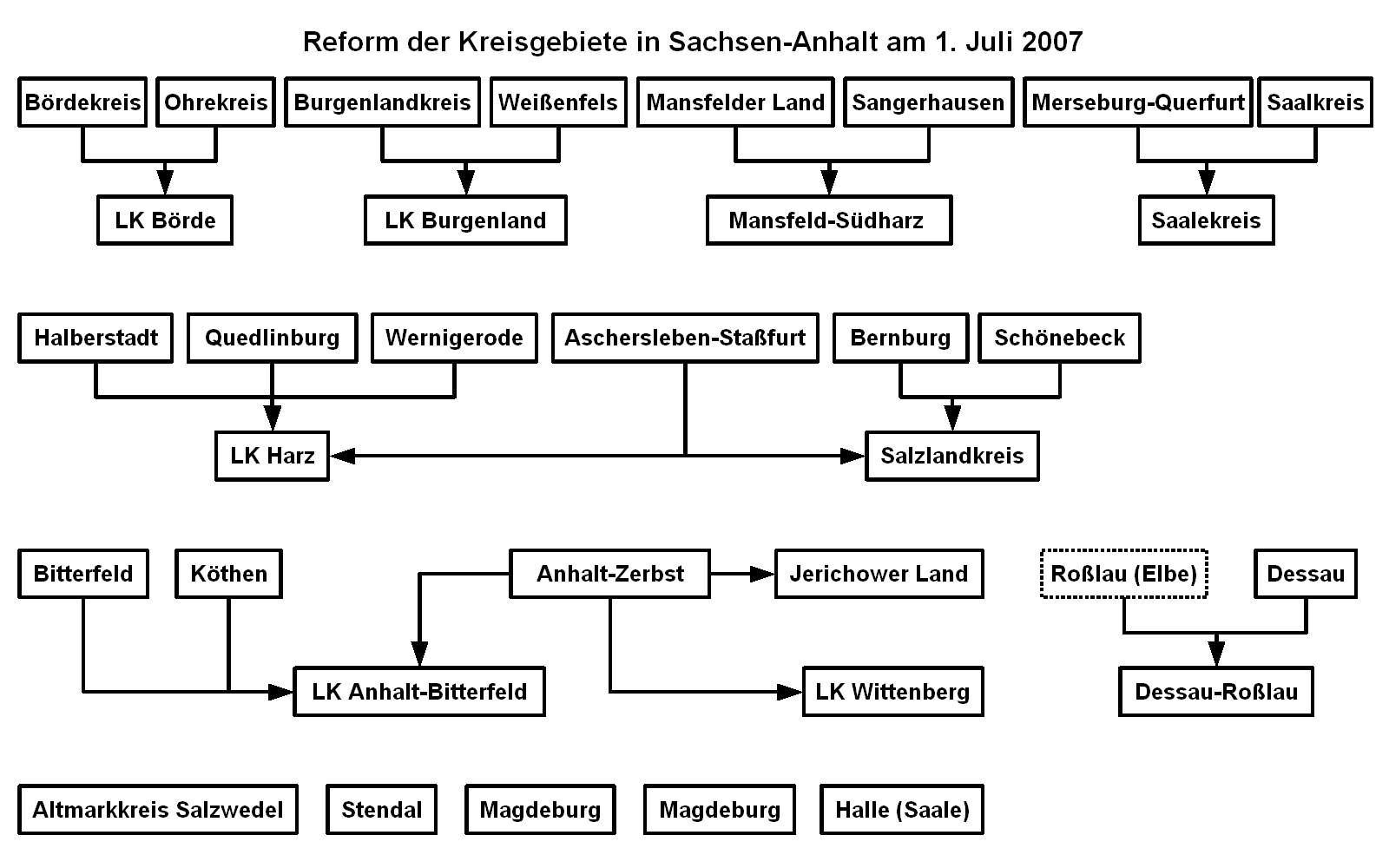

== Further developments ==
- The Salzland district Parliament decided to change the name to Salzlandkreis.
- On 16 July 2007 the Burgenland district Parliament decided to change the name again to Burgenlandkreis, which came into effect on the 1 August 2007.
