= Drebsdorf =

- Ortsteil of Südharz
- Interactive map of Drebsdorf
- Location within Germany Location within Saxony-Anhalt
- Coordinates: 51°28′58″N 11°10′32″E
- Country: Germany
- State: Saxony-Anhalt
- District: Mansfeld-Südharz
- Municipality: Südharz

Area
  - Total: 4.29 km^{2} (1.66 sq mi)
- Elevation: 217 m (712 ft)

Population (2006-12-31)
  - Total: 108
  - Density: 25.2/km^{2} (65.2/sq mi)
- Time zone: UTC+01:00 (CET)
  - Summer (DST): UTC+02:00 (CEST)
- Postal codes: 06528
- Dialling codes: 034656
- Vehicle registration: MSH
- Website: www.rossla.de

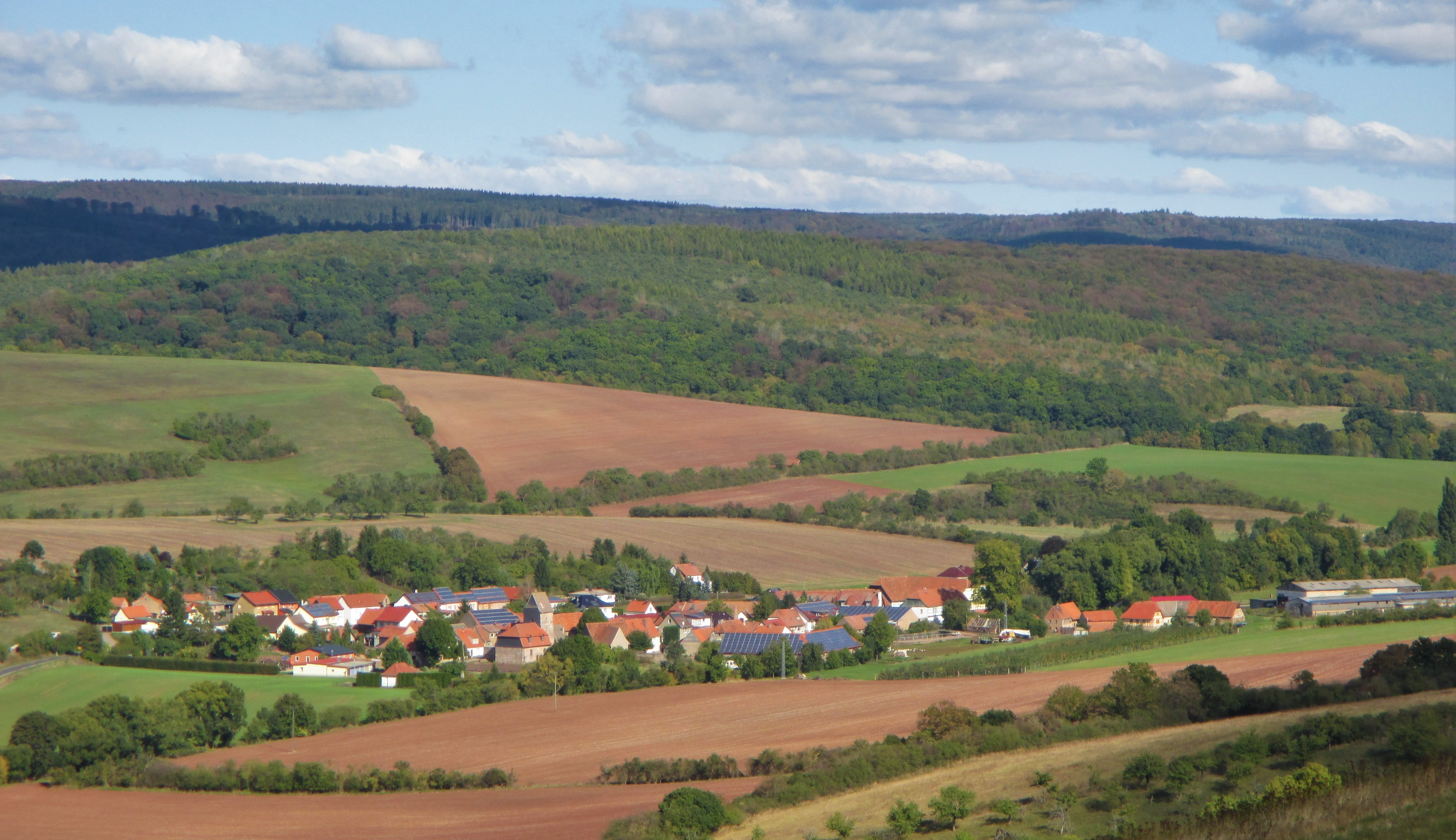
Drebsdorf

Drebsdorf is a village and a former municipality in the Mansfeld-Südharz district, Saxony-Anhalt, Germany.

Since 1 January 2010, it is part of the municipality Südharz.
