= Wickerode =

- Ortsteil of Südharz
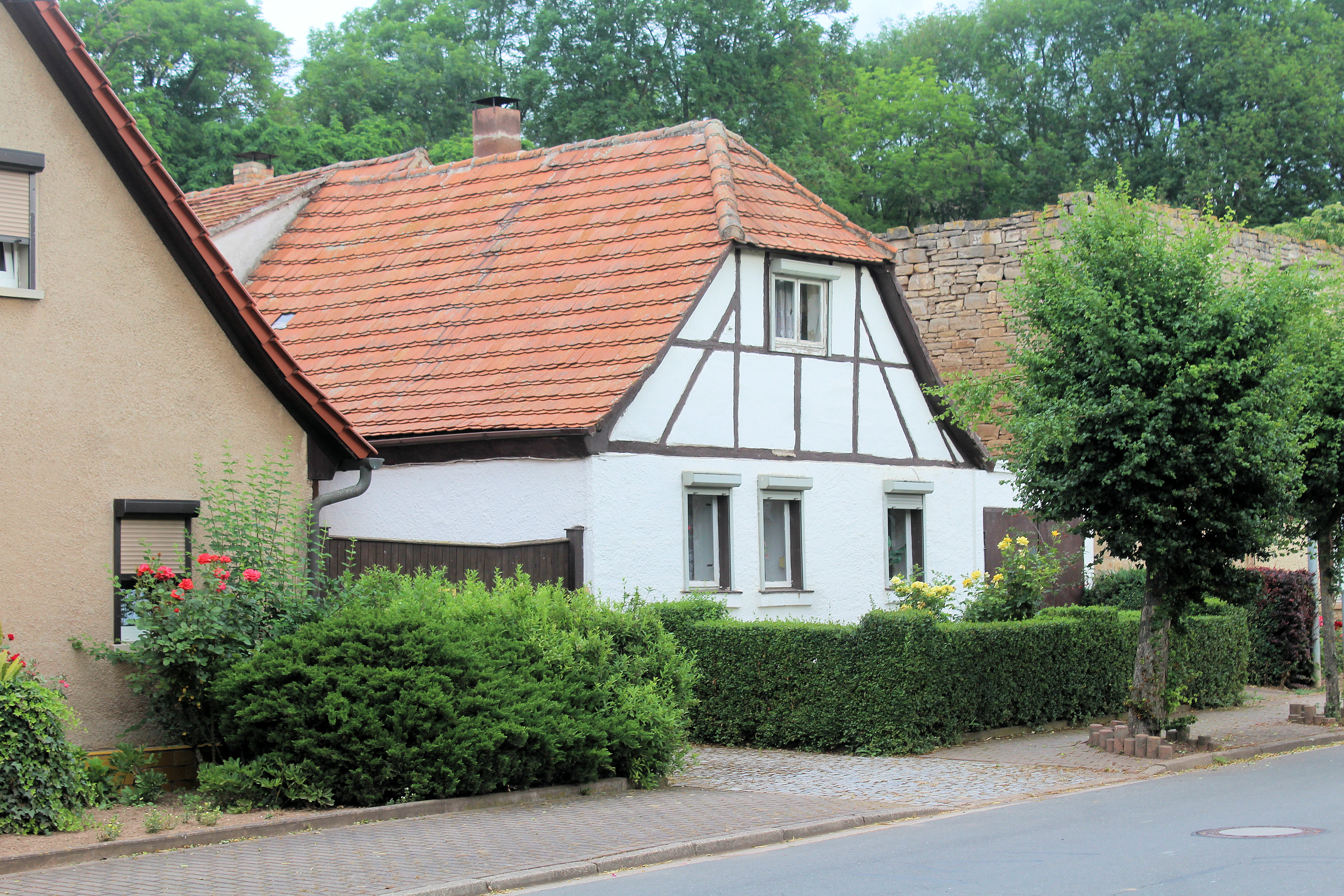
- Interactive map of Wickerode
- Location within Germany Location within Saxony-Anhalt
- Coordinates: 51°29′N 11°8′E
- Country: Germany
- State: Saxony-Anhalt
- District: Mansfeld-Südharz
- Municipality: Südharz

Area
  - Total: 6.86 km^{2} (2.65 sq mi)
- Elevation: 150 m (490 ft)

Population (2009-12-31)
  - Total: 273
  - Density: 39.8/km^{2} (103/sq mi)
- Time zone: UTC+01:00 (CET)
  - Summer (DST): UTC+02:00 (CEST)
- Postal codes: 06536
- Dialling codes: 034651
- Vehicle registration: MSH
- Website: gemeinde-suedharz.de

Wickerode (German pronunciation: [vɪkəˈʁoːdə]) is a village and a former municipality in the Mansfeld-Südharz district, Saxony-Anhalt, in central Germany.

Since 1 September 2010, it is part of the municipality Südharz.

During World War II, in 1945, it was the location of a subcamp of the Mittelbau-Dora concentration camp, in which Italians were held and subjected to forced labour.
