= Questenberg =

- Ortsteil of Südharz
- Interactive map of Questenberg
- Location within Germany Location within Saxony-Anhalt
- Coordinates: 51°29′38″N 11°7′11″E
- Country: Germany
- State: Saxony-Anhalt
- District: Mansfeld-Südharz
- Municipality: Südharz

Area
  - Total: 17.25 km^{2} (6.66 sq mi)
- Elevation: 188 m (617 ft)

Population (2006-12-31)
  - Total: 289
  - Density: 16.8/km^{2} (43.4/sq mi)
- Time zone: UTC+01:00 (CET)
  - Summer (DST): UTC+02:00 (CEST)
- Postal codes: 06536
- Dialling codes: 034651
- Vehicle registration: MSH
- Website: gemeinde-suedharz.de

Questenberg is a village and a former municipality in the Mansfeld-Südharz district, Saxony-Anhalt, Germany. Since 1 January 2010, it has been part of the Südharz municipality.

First settlement traces date from 5th and 6th centuries BC. Above the place is the castle called Questenburg. Remainders of the castle (attachment walls and tower), on the steep mountain at the eastern periphery of the village can still be visited and is currently restored by the local Förderverein Questenburg e.V.
