= Kleinleinungen =

- Ortsteil of Südharz
- Interactive map of Kleinleinungen
- Location within Germany Location within Saxony-Anhalt
- Coordinates: 51°28′44″N 11°9′47″E
- Country: Germany
- State: Saxony-Anhalt
- District: Mansfeld-Südharz
- Municipality: Südharz

Area
  - Total: 3.31 km^{2} (1.28 sq mi)
- Elevation: 150 m (490 ft)

Population (2006-12-31)
  - Total: 138
  - Density: 41.7/km^{2} (108/sq mi)
- Time zone: UTC+01:00 (CET)
  - Summer (DST): UTC+02:00 (CEST)
- Postal codes: 06528
- Dialling codes: 034656
- Vehicle registration: MSH
- Website: www.kleinleinungen.de

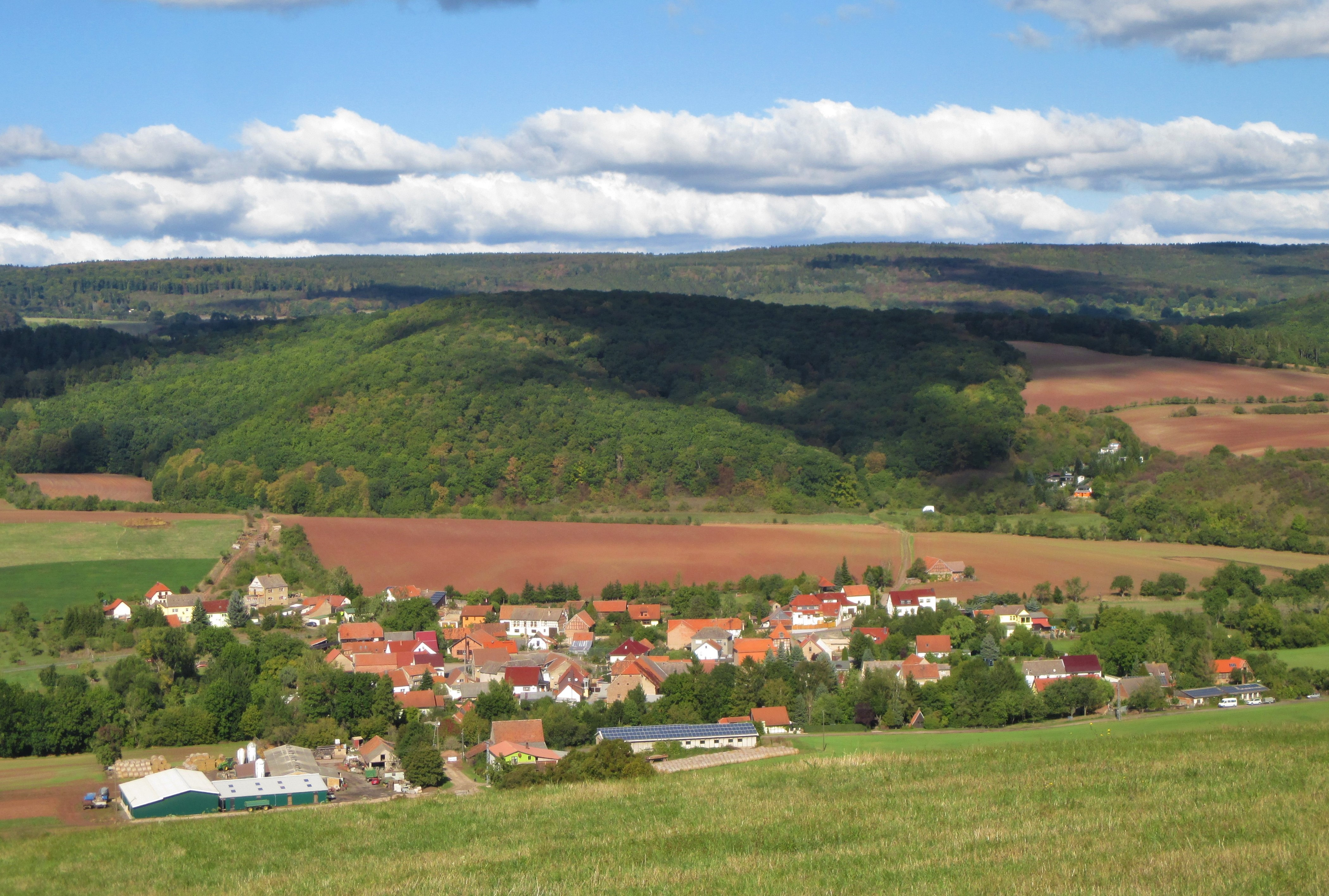
Parts of Kleinleinungen seen from the top of a hill

Kleinleinungen is a village and a former municipality in the Mansfeld-Südharz district, Saxony-Anhalt, Germany.

Since 1 January 2010, it is part of the municipality Südharz.
