= Südharz =

- Municipality
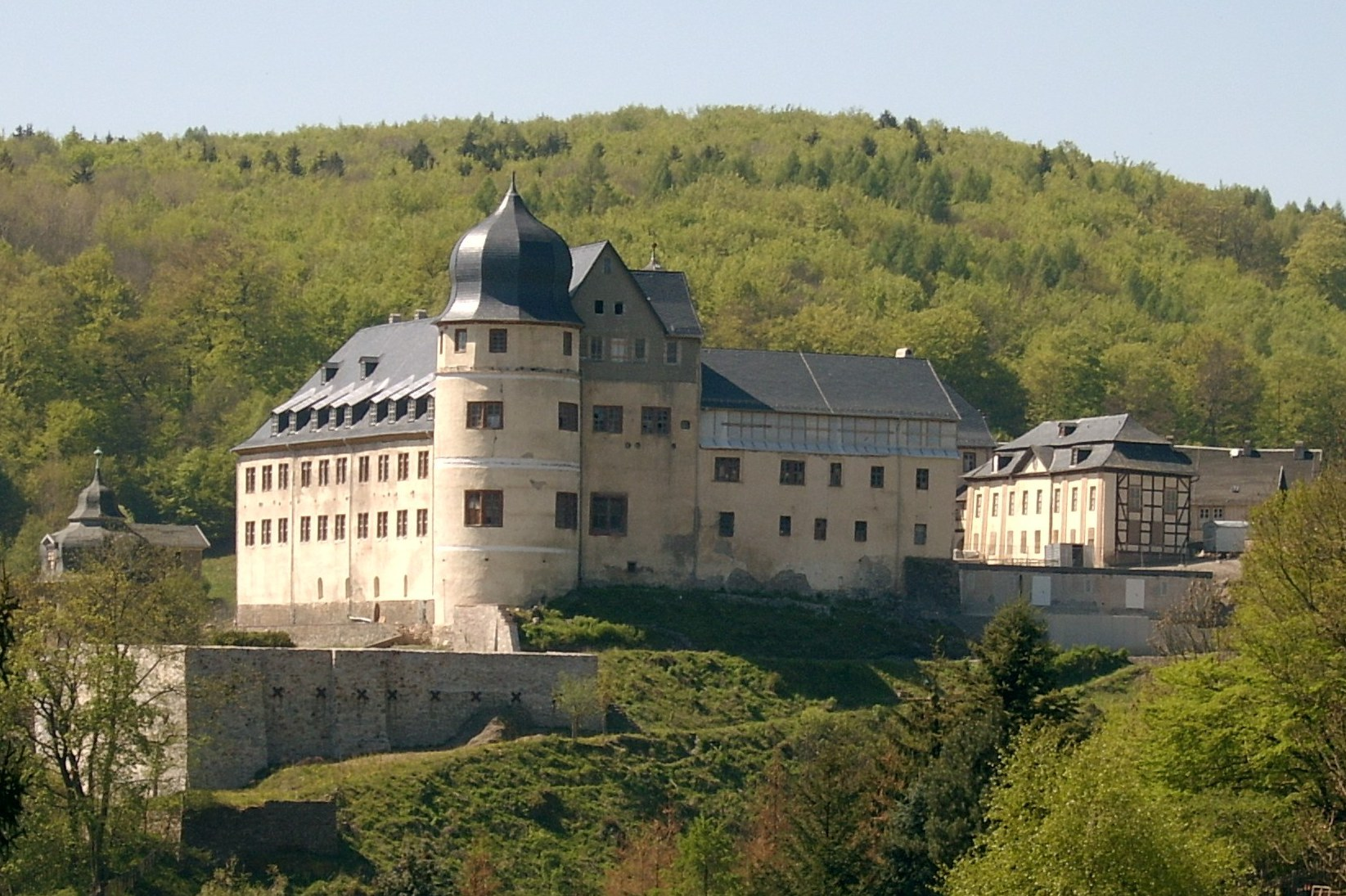
- Stolberg Castle in Stolberg

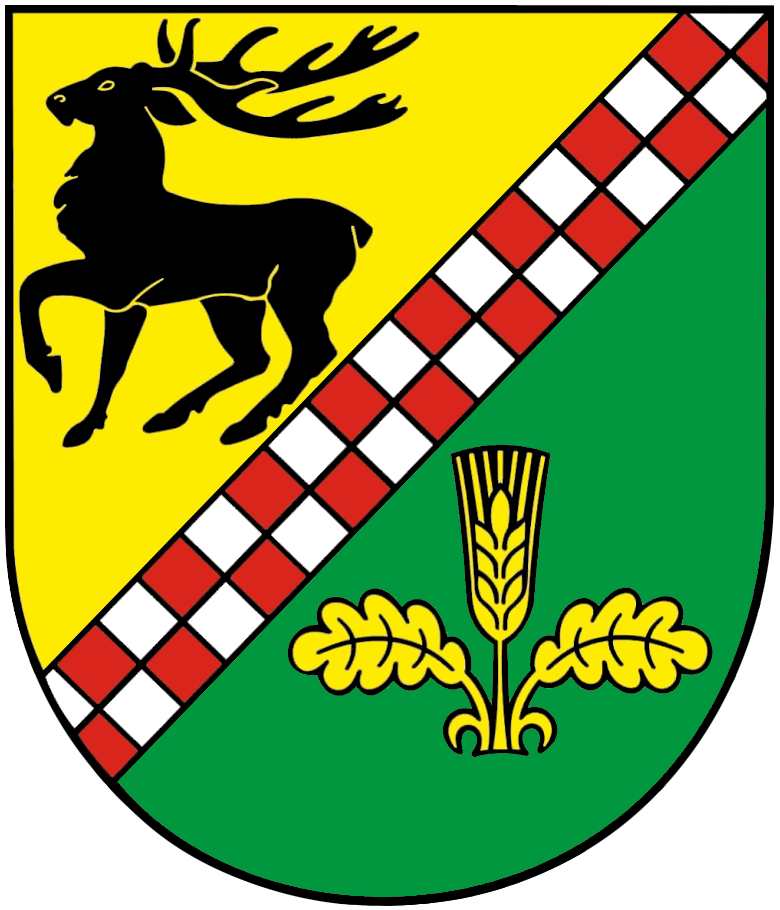
- Coat of arms

- Location of Südharz within Mansfeld-Südharz district
- Interactive map of Südharz
- Location within Germany Location within Saxony-Anhalt
- Coordinates: 51°29′N 11°04′E
- Country: Germany
- State: Saxony-Anhalt
- District: Mansfeld-Südharz

Government
  - Mayor (2022–29): Peter Kohl

Area
  - Total: 236.38 km^{2} (91.27 sq mi)
- Elevation: 145 m (476 ft)

Population (2025-12-31)
  - Total: 8,734
  - Density: 36.95/km^{2} (95.70/sq mi)
- Time zone: UTC+01:00 (CET)
  - Summer (DST): UTC+02:00 (CEST)
- Postal codes: 06536
- Dialling codes: 034651, 034653, 034654, 034656, 034658
- Vehicle registration: MSH, EIL, HET, ML, SGH

Südharz (German pronunciation: [ˈzyːtˌhaːɐ̯ts], lit. 'South Harz') is a municipality in the Mansfeld-Südharz district, Saxony-Anhalt, Germany. It was formed on 1 January 2010 by the merger of the former municipalities Bennungen, Breitenstein, Breitungen, Dietersdorf, Drebsdorf, Hainrode, Hayn, Kleinleinungen, Questenberg (incl. Agnesdorf), Roßla (incl. Dittichenrode), Rottleberode, Schwenda and Uftrungen. Wickerode and the town Stolberg were added in September 2010. These 15 former municipalities are now Ortschaften or municipal divisions of Südharz.
