= Schwenda =

- Ortsteil of Südharz
- Interactive map of Schwenda
- Location within Germany Location within Saxony-Anhalt
- Coordinates: 51°32′N 11°1′E
- Country: Germany
- State: Saxony-Anhalt
- District: Mansfeld-Südharz
- Municipality: Südharz

Area
  - Total: 10.23 km^{2} (3.95 sq mi)
- Elevation: 450 m (1,480 ft)

Population (2006-12-31)
  - Total: 597
  - Density: 58.4/km^{2} (151/sq mi)
- Time zone: UTC+01:00 (CET)
  - Summer (DST): UTC+02:00 (CEST)
- Postal codes: 06547
- Dialling codes: 034658
- Vehicle registration: MSH
- Website: gemeinde-suedharz.de

Schwenda (German pronunciation: [ˈʃvɛnda]) is a village and a former municipality in the Mansfeld-Südharz district, Saxony-Anhalt, Germany. Since 1 January 2010, it is part of the municipality Südharz. The village is known for its unusual octagonal baroque church.
