= Hayn, Saxony-Anhalt =

- Ortsteil of Südharz
- Interactive map of Hayn, Saxony-Anhalt
- Location within Germany Location within Saxony-Anhalt
- Coordinates: 51°34′10″N 11°4′32″E
- Country: Germany
- State: Saxony-Anhalt
- District: Mansfeld-Südharz
- Municipality: Südharz

Area
  - Total: 20.04 km^{2} (7.74 sq mi)
- Elevation: 368 m (1,207 ft)

Population (2006-12-31)
  - Total: 584
  - Density: 29.1/km^{2} (75.5/sq mi)
- Time zone: UTC+01:00 (CET)
  - Summer (DST): UTC+02:00 (CEST)
- Postal codes: 06536
- Dialling codes: 034658
- Vehicle registration: MSH
- Website: gemeinde-suedharz.de

Hayn (German pronunciation: [haɪn]) is a village and a former municipality in the Mansfeld-Südharz district, Saxony-Anhalt, Germany.

Since 1 January 2010, it is part of the municipality Südharz.
