= Dietersdorf =

Village in Saxony-Anhalt, Germany

- Ortsteil of Südharz
- Interactive map of Dietersdorf
- Location within Germany Location within Saxony-Anhalt
- Coordinates: 51°31′44″N 11°2′50″E
- Country: Germany
- State: Saxony-Anhalt
- District: Mansfeld-Südharz
- Municipality: Südharz

Area
  - Total: 16.69 km^{2} (6.44 sq mi)
- Elevation: 430 m (1,410 ft)

Population (2015-12-31)
  - Total: 286
  - Density: 17.1/km^{2} (44.4/sq mi)
- Time zone: UTC+01:00 (CET)
  - Summer (DST): UTC+02:00 (CEST)
- Postal codes: 06536
- Dialling codes: 034658
- Vehicle registration: MSH
- Website: gemeinde-suedharz.de

Dietersdorf (German pronunciation: [ˈdiːtɐsdɔʁf]) is a village and a former municipality in the Mansfeld-Südharz district, Saxony-Anhalt, Germany. Since 1 January 2010, it is part of the municipality Südharz.
