= Uftrungen =

German village

- Ortsteil of Südharz
- Interactive map of Uftrungen
- Location within Germany Location within Saxony-Anhalt
- Coordinates: 51°29′56″N 10°58′47″E
- Country: Germany
- State: Saxony-Anhalt
- District: Mansfeld-Südharz
- Municipality: Südharz

Area
  - Total: 29.65 km^{2} (11.45 sq mi)
- Elevation: 221 m (725 ft)

Population (2006-12-31)
  - Total: 1,108
  - Density: 37.37/km^{2} (96.79/sq mi)
- Time zone: UTC+01:00 (CET)
  - Summer (DST): UTC+02:00 (CEST)
- Postal codes: 06548
- Dialling codes: 034653
- Vehicle registration: MSH
- Website: gemeinde-suedharz.de

Uftrungen (German pronunciation: [ˈʊftʁʊŋən]) is a village and a former municipality in the Mansfeld-Südharz district, Saxony-Anhalt, Germany. Since 1 January 2010, it is part of the municipality Südharz.

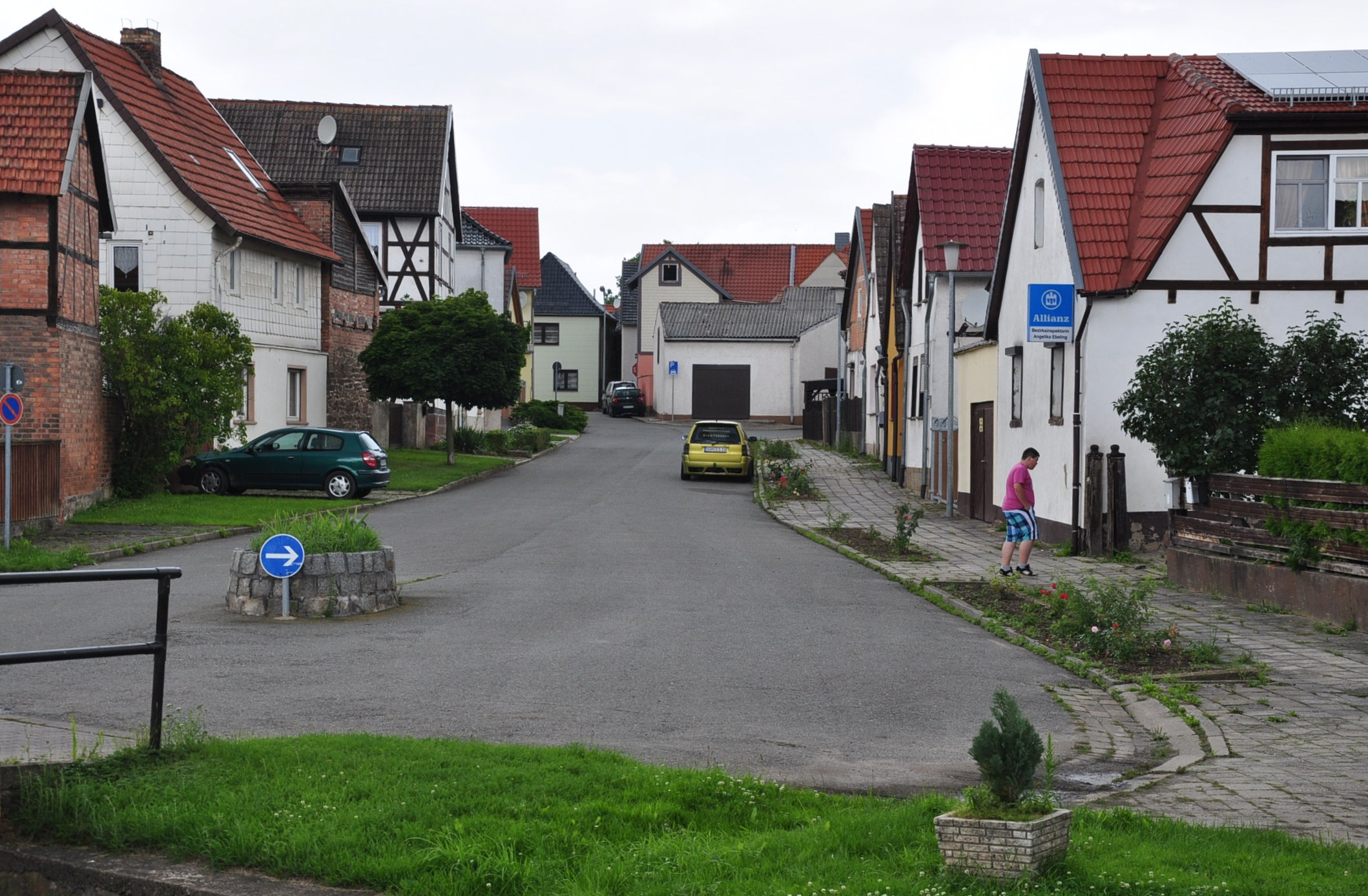
The Schluftstraße

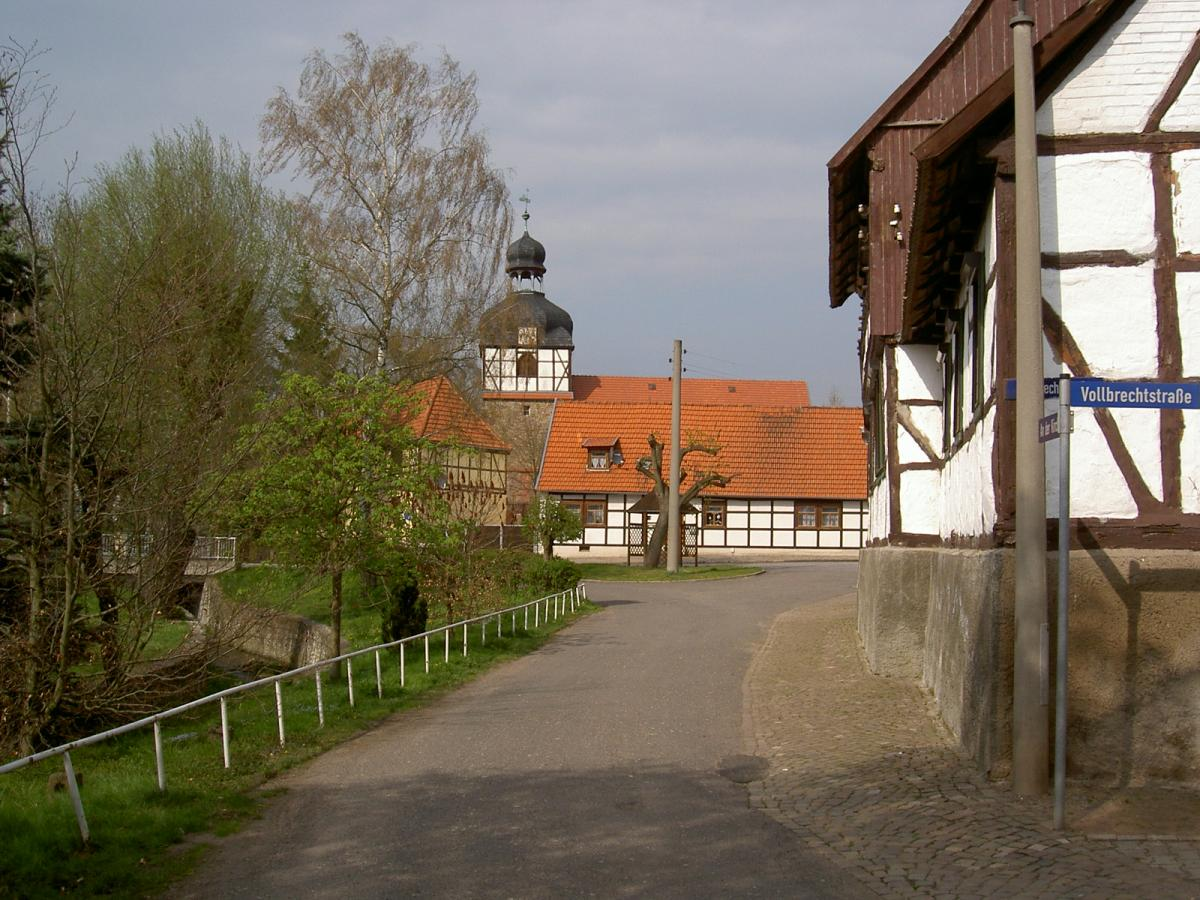
Village centre with church

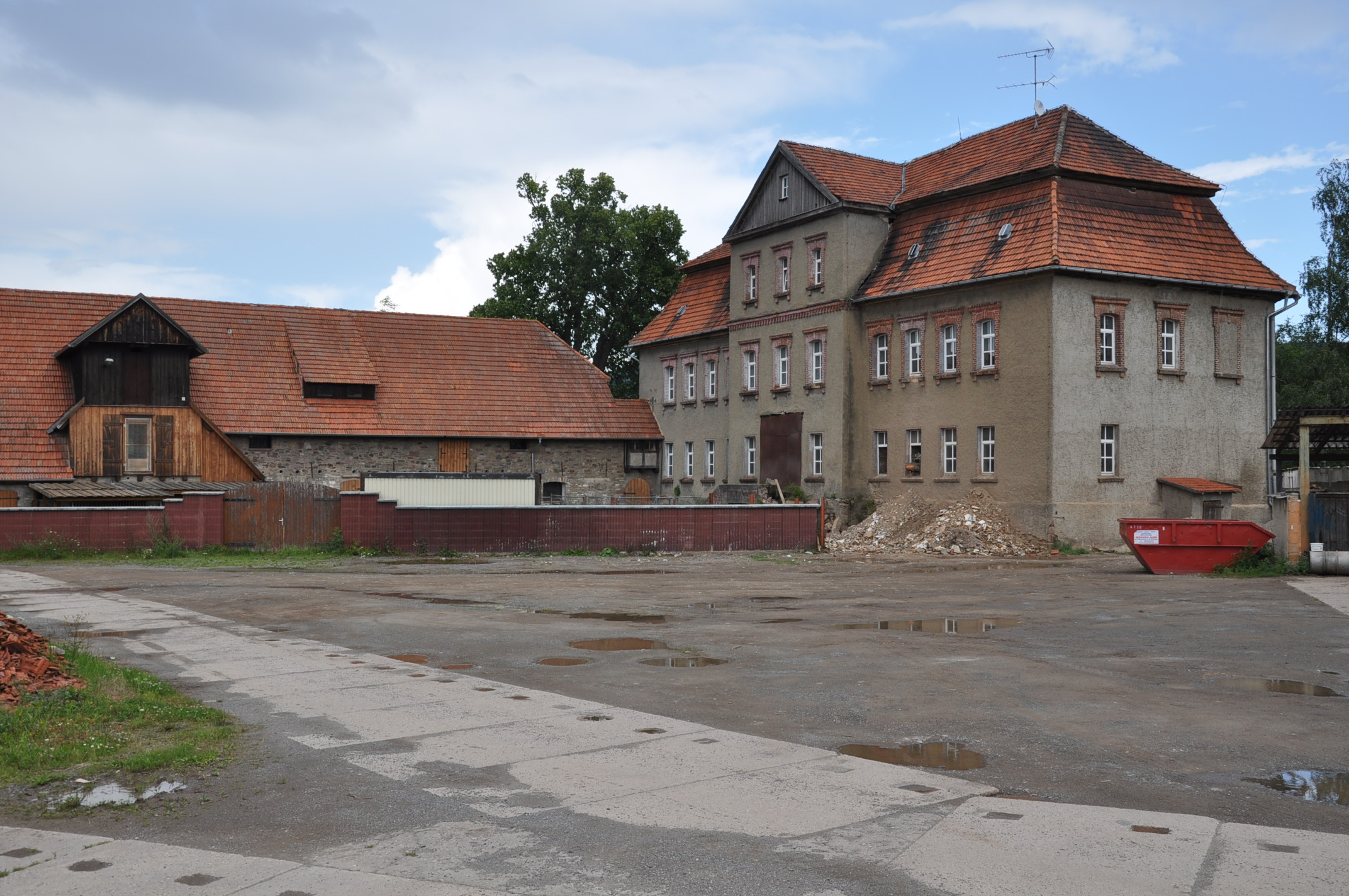
Abandoned area "An der Kirche"

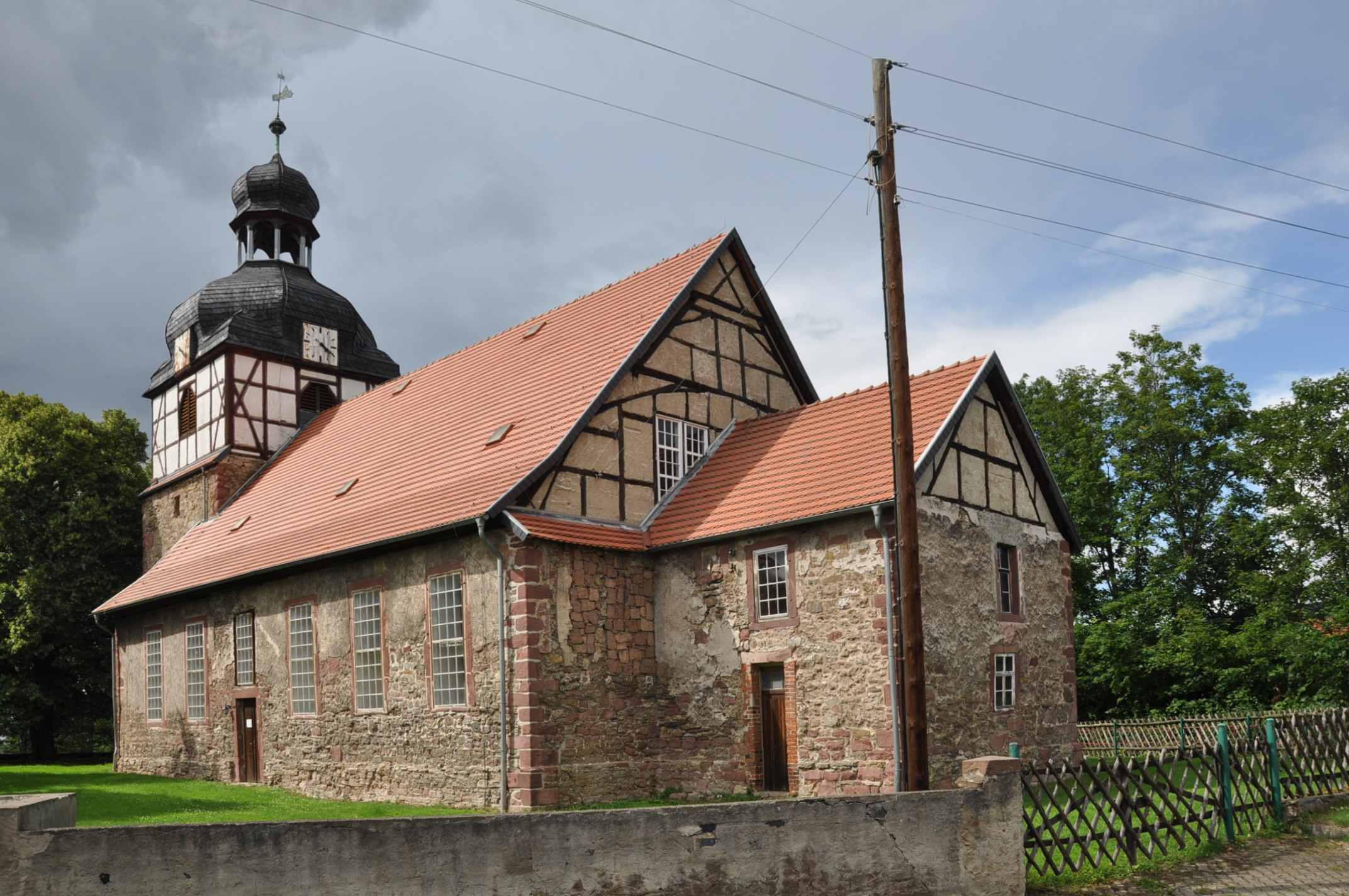
St. Andrews' church (1732–1734)
