= Hainrode =

- Ortsteil of Südharz
- Interactive map of Hainrode
- Location within Germany Location within Saxony-Anhalt
- Coordinates: 51°30′2″N 11°10′5″E
- Country: Germany
- State: Saxony-Anhalt
- District: Mansfeld-Südharz
- Municipality: Südharz

Area
  - Total: 7.35 km^{2} (2.84 sq mi)
- Elevation: 248 m (814 ft)

Population (2006-12-31)
  - Total: 352
  - Density: 47.9/km^{2} (124/sq mi)
- Time zone: UTC+01:00 (CET)
  - Summer (DST): UTC+02:00 (CEST)
- Postal codes: 06528
- Dialling codes: 034656
- Vehicle registration: MSH
- Website: gemeinde-suedharz.de

Hainrode (German pronunciation: [haɪnˈʁoːdə]) is a village and a former municipality in the Mansfeld-Südharz district, Saxony-Anhalt, Germany.

Since 1 January 2010, it is part of the municipality Südharz.
