= Breitungen, Saxony-Anhalt =

Breitungen
- Ortsteil of Südharz
- Interactive map of Breitungen
- Location within Germany Location within Saxony-Anhalt
- Coordinates: 51°30′N 11°3′E
- Country: Germany
- State: Saxony-Anhalt
- District: Mansfeld-Südharz
- Municipality: Südharz

Area
  - Total: 11.52 km^{2} (4.45 sq mi)
- Elevation: 250 m (820 ft)

Population (2006-12-31)
  - Total: 496
  - Density: 43.1/km^{2} (112/sq mi)
- Time zone: UTC+01:00 (CET)
  - Summer (DST): UTC+02:00 (CEST)
- Postal codes: 06536
- Dialling codes: 034651
- Vehicle registration: MSH
- Website: gemeinde-suedharz.de

Breitungen (German pronunciation: [ˈbʁaɪtʊŋən]) is a village and a former municipality in the Mansfeld-Südharz district, Saxony-Anhalt, Germany.

Since 1 January 2010, it is part of the municipality Südharz.
