= Rottleberode =

- Ortsteil of Südharz
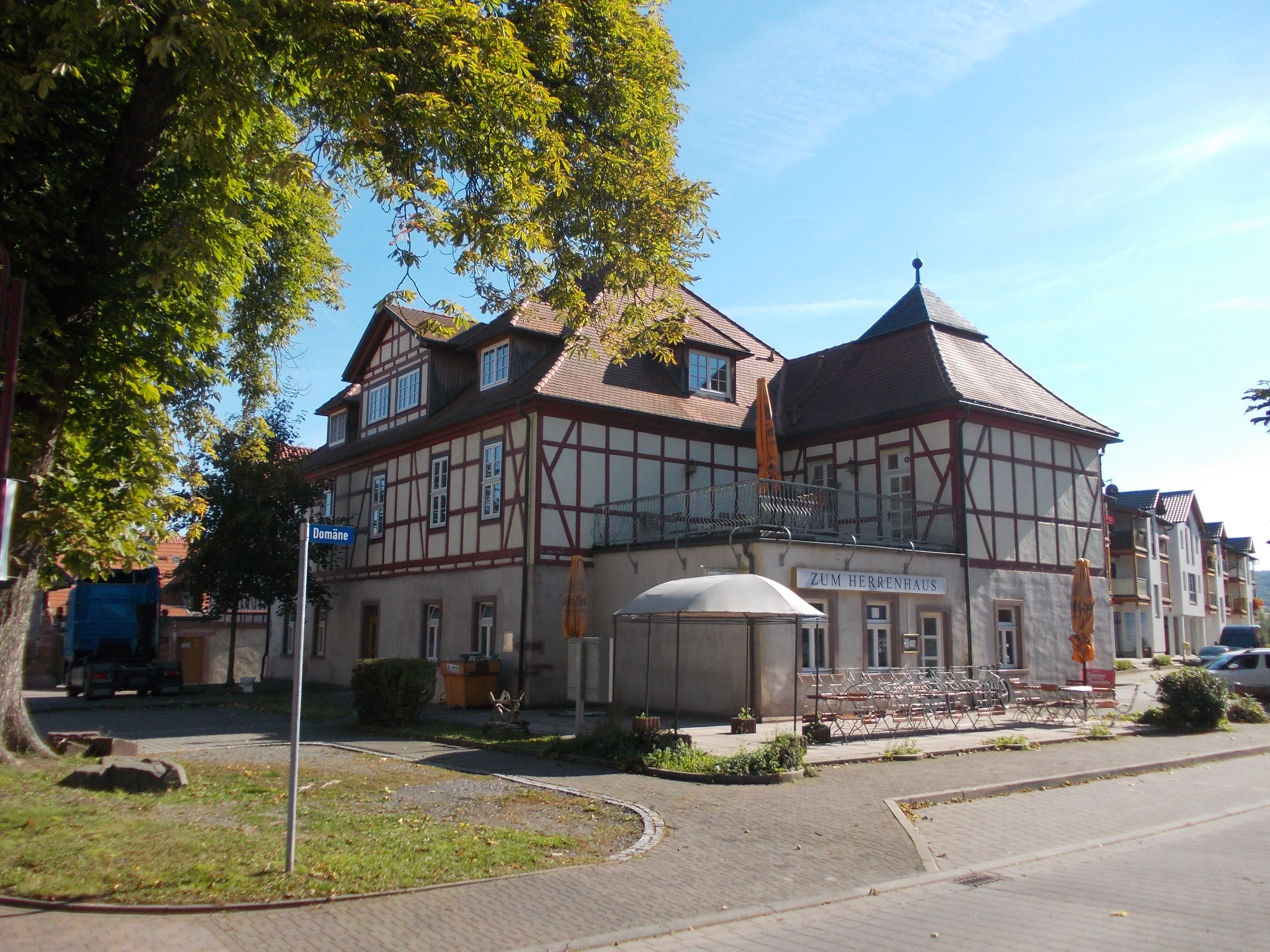
- Interactive map of Rottleberode
- Location within Germany Location within Saxony-Anhalt
- Coordinates: 51°31′6″N 10°56′50″E
- Country: Germany
- State: Saxony-Anhalt
- District: Mansfeld-Südharz
- Municipality: Südharz

Area
  - Total: 6.99 km^{2} (2.70 sq mi)
- Elevation: 202 m (663 ft)

Population (2006-12-31)
  - Total: 1,574
  - Density: 225/km^{2} (583/sq mi)
- Time zone: UTC+01:00 (CET)
  - Summer (DST): UTC+02:00 (CEST)
- Postal codes: 06548
- Dialling codes: 034653
- Vehicle registration: MSH
- Website: www.rossla.de

Rottleberode is a village and a former municipality in the Mansfeld-Südharz district, Saxony-Anhalt, Germany.

Since 1 January 2010, it is part of the municipality Südharz.
