= Roßla =

- Ortsteil of Südharz
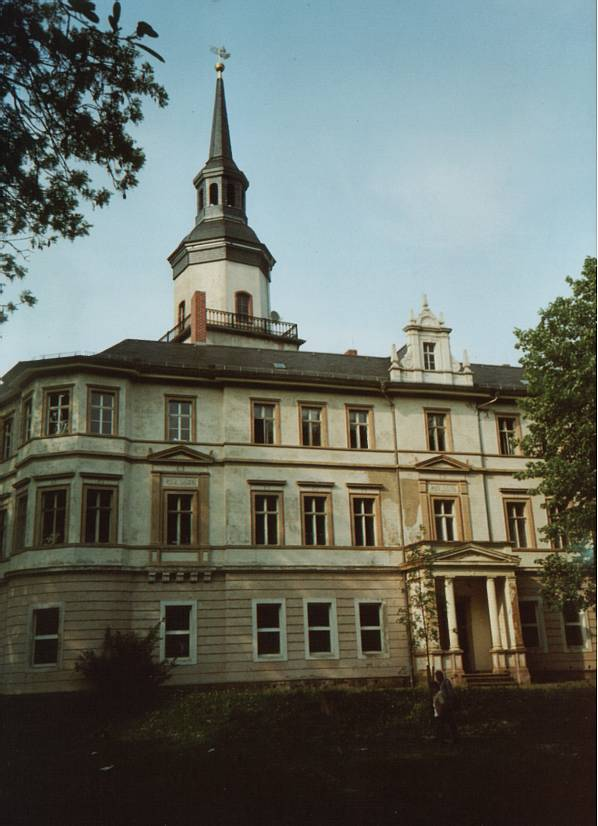
- Roßla Castle

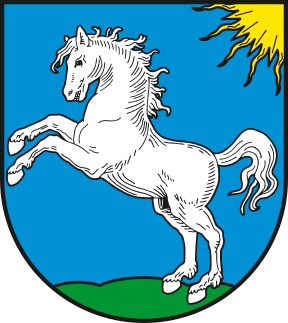
- Coat of arms
- Interactive map of Roßla
- Location within Germany Location within Saxony-Anhalt
- Coordinates: 51°27′53″N 11°4′35″E
- Country: Germany
- State: Saxony-Anhalt
- District: Mansfeld-Südharz
- Municipality: Südharz

Area
  - Total: 17.64 km^{2} (6.81 sq mi)
- Elevation: 145 m (476 ft)

Population (2006-12-31)
  - Total: 2,319
  - Density: 131.5/km^{2} (340.5/sq mi)
- Time zone: UTC+01:00 (CET)
  - Summer (DST): UTC+02:00 (CEST)
- Postal codes: 06536
- Dialling codes: 034651
- Vehicle registration: MSH
- Website: www.rossla.de

Roßla (also: Rossla) is a village and a former municipality in the Mansfeld-Südharz district, Saxony-Anhalt, Germany. Since 1 January 2010, it is part of the municipality Südharz.

From 1706–1803, Rossla was the seat of Stolberg-Rossla.
