= Bennungen =

- Ortsteil of Südharz
- Interactive map of Bennungen
- Location within Germany Location within Saxony-Anhalt
- Coordinates: 51°27′42″N 11°7′2″E
- Country: Germany
- State: Saxony-Anhalt
- District: Mansfeld-Südharz
- Municipality: Südharz

Area
  - Total: 10.28 km^{2} (3.97 sq mi)
- Elevation: 144 m (472 ft)

Population (2006-12-31)
  - Total: 950
  - Density: 92/km^{2} (240/sq mi)
- Time zone: UTC+01:00 (CET)
  - Summer (DST): UTC+02:00 (CEST)
- Postal codes: 06536
- Dialling codes: 034651
- Vehicle registration: MSH
- Website: gemeinde-suedharz.de

Bennungen (German pronunciation: [ˈbɛnʊŋən]) is a village and a former municipality in the Mansfeld-Südharz district, Saxony-Anhalt, Germany.

Since 1 January 2010, it is part of the municipality Südharz.
