= Breitenstein, Saxony-Anhalt =

Breitenstein
- Ortsteil of Südharz
- Interactive map of Breitenstein
- Location within Germany Location within Saxony-Anhalt
- Coordinates: 51°37′16″N 10°56′49″E
- Country: Germany
- State: Saxony-Anhalt
- District: Mansfeld-Südharz
- Municipality: Südharz

Area
  - Total: 6.74 km^{2} (2.60 sq mi)
- Elevation: 487 m (1,598 ft)

Population (2006-12-31)
  - Total: 507
  - Density: 75.2/km^{2} (195/sq mi)
- Time zone: UTC+01:00 (CET)
  - Summer (DST): UTC+02:00 (CEST)
- Postal codes: 06547
- Dialling codes: 034654
- Vehicle registration: MSH
- Website: gemeinde-suedharz.de

Breitenstein (German pronunciation: [ˈbʁaɪtn̩ˌʃtaɪn]) is a village and a former municipality in the Mansfeld-Südharz district, Saxony-Anhalt, Germany. Since 1 January 2010, it is part of the municipality of Südharz.
