= House of Asseburg =

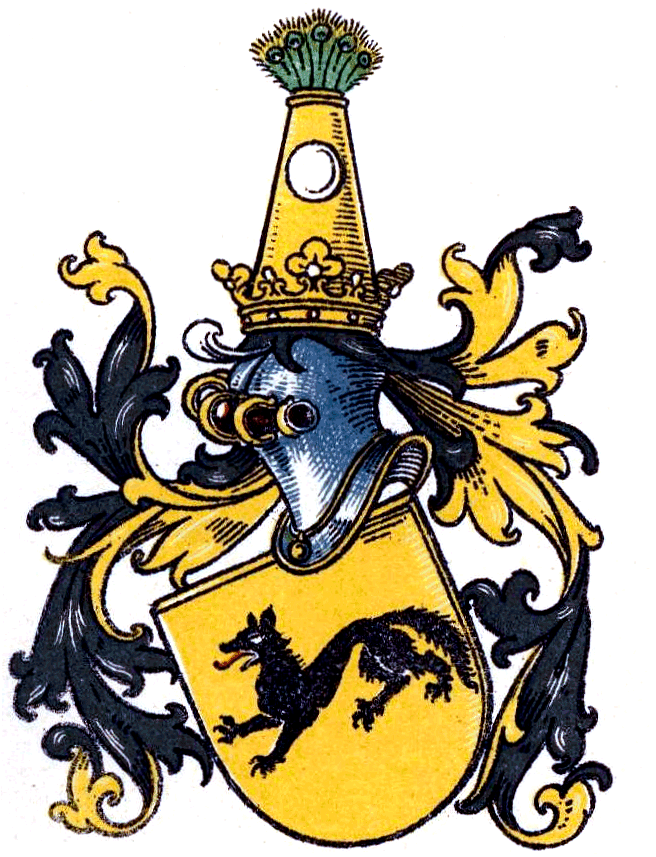
Coat of arms of the Asseburgs

The House of Asseburg, original German name von der Asseburg, is an old Lower Saxon aristocratic family which had its origin in Wolfenbüttel and Asseburg. During the 12th and 13th centuries the lords of Wolfenbüttel were able to establish their own small county, but were soon forced to give way to the Brunswick dukes of the House of Welf. Later their title was taken over by other families in the female line, and the counts of Asseburg continue to be landowners to this day.

== History ==
=== Origins at Wolfenbüttel, Peine and Asseburg ===
The family was originally named von Wolfenbüttel, and its first member, Widekind of Wolfenbüttel, is recorded between 1089 and 1118. As ministerialis to Egbert II, Margrave of Meissen, count of Brunswick, he held an influential position and was able to support the margrave in the Saxon rebellion against Emperor Henry IV. Widekind had a water castle erected, Schloss Wolfenbüttel, first recorded in 1074 as a fort on the river Oker. In the Oker marshes there was already a small settlement known as Wulferisbuttle, sited on the important trade route between the Rhine and Elbe, from Brunswick to Halberstadt and Leipzig, also connecting the bishoprics of Halberstadt and Hildesheim, and used by both merchants and pilgrim monks. In 1191 however, the castle was destroyed by duke Henry the Lion of Saxony, the head of the House of Welf and brother-in-law of King Richard Lionheart. It was then rebuilt by the Wolfenbüttel lords.

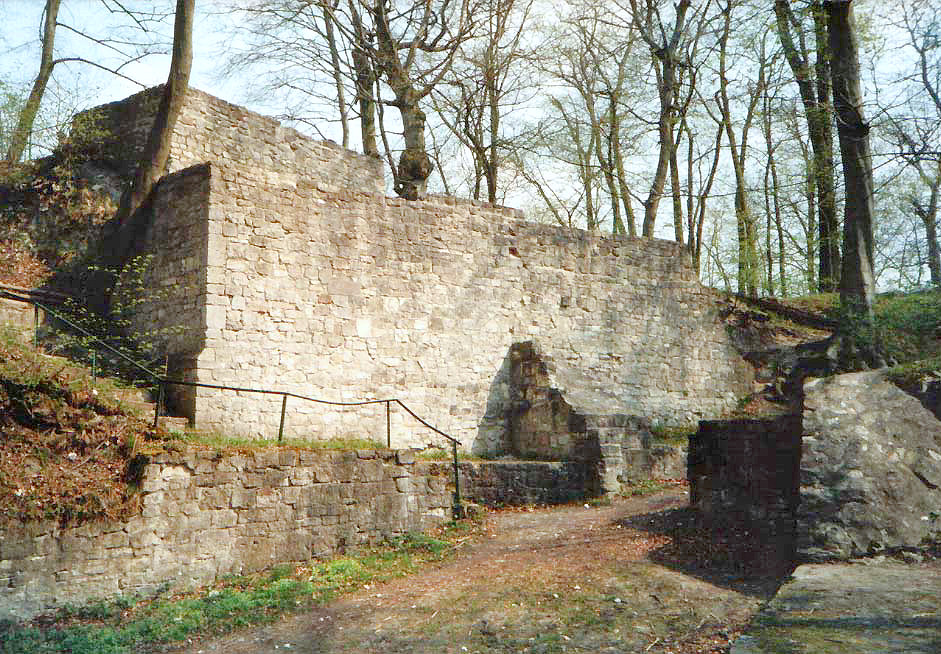
Asseburg Castle

Gunzelin of Wolfenbüttel (1187–1255), a great-grandson of Widekind, was an imperial seneschal and army commander to two successive German emperors, Otto IV of the House of Welf, son of Henry the Lion, and Frederick II of the House of Hohenstaufen. In 1202, he conquered and seized Peine Castle from the bishops of Hildesheim and founded the city of Peine, styling himself count of Peine. As his inherited estates around Wolfenbüttel were located near the Welf territories around Brunswick, he built Asseburg Castle, south of Wolfenbüttel, in 1218, in order to gain security. When he refused to swear allegiance to Duke Albert I of Brunswick-Lüneburg in 1255, the latter destroyed Wolfenbüttel Castle once again. The House of Welf then took over Wolfenbüttel. Wolfenbüttel Castle was only reconstructed from 1283 onwards, by Henry I of Brunswick, to become one of the favorite residences of the Brunswick dukes.

Gunzelin's eldest son, Burchardus de Asseburc (Burchard or Busso of Asseburg), first mentioned in 1219, was the first family member to name himself after the new seat. But as early as 1258, Asseburg Castle also had to be relinquished to Duke Albert I, however only after Burchard had been able to withstand a siege during three years. Burchard was then allowed to retreat himself to Westphalia with his knights and received a compensation of 400 gold mark for the castle. After Gunzelin's death in 1260, his sons lost the county of Peine to the bishop of Hildesheim. Other noble families who all carry similar coats of arms (with a wolf) and spread in the same wider area, are also believed to descend from the lords of Wolfenbüttel, counts of Peine, such as the von Bartensleben, von Berwinkel, von Apenburg and von Winterfeld.

=== Later history ===
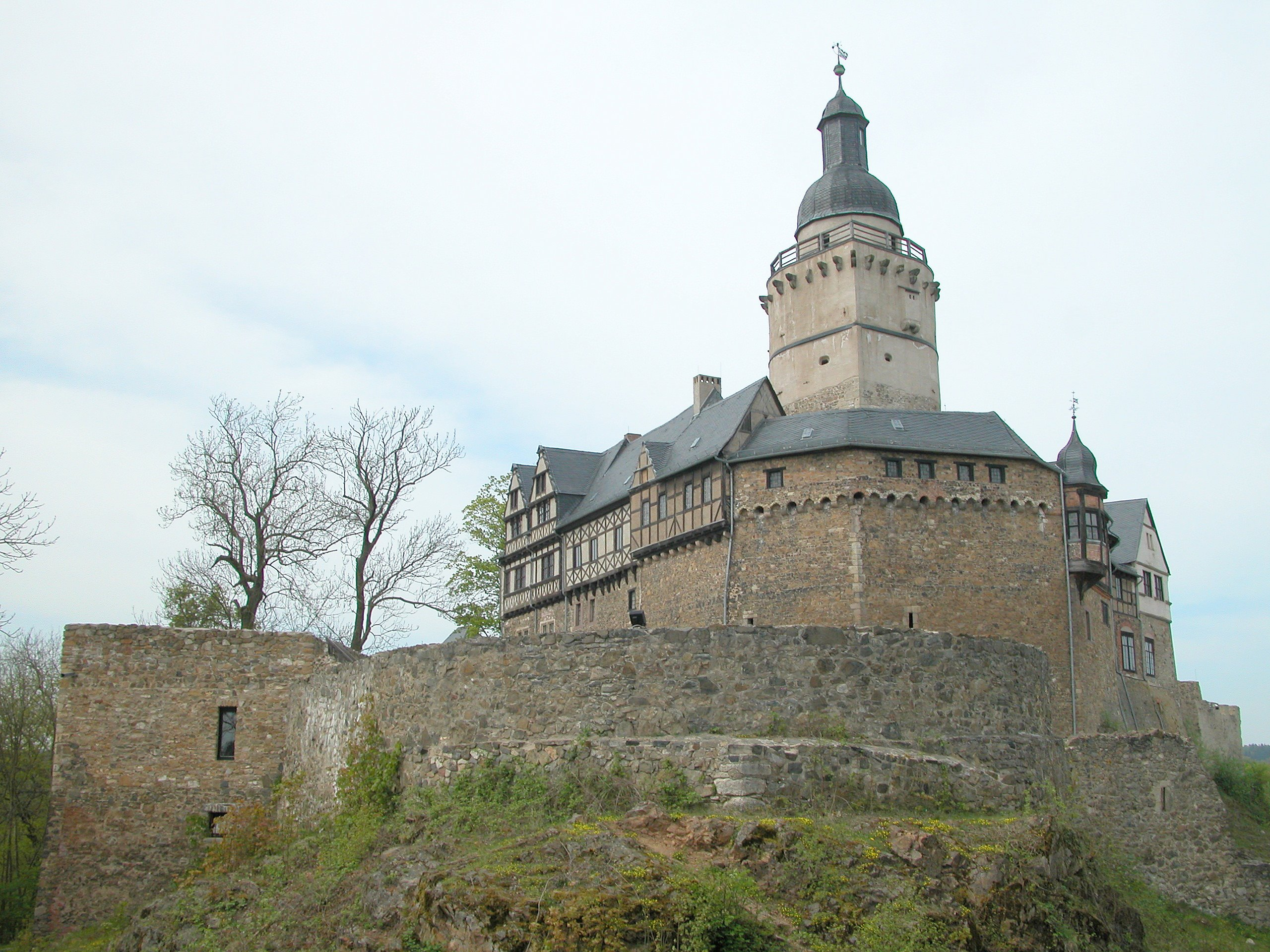
Falkenstein Castle (Harz)

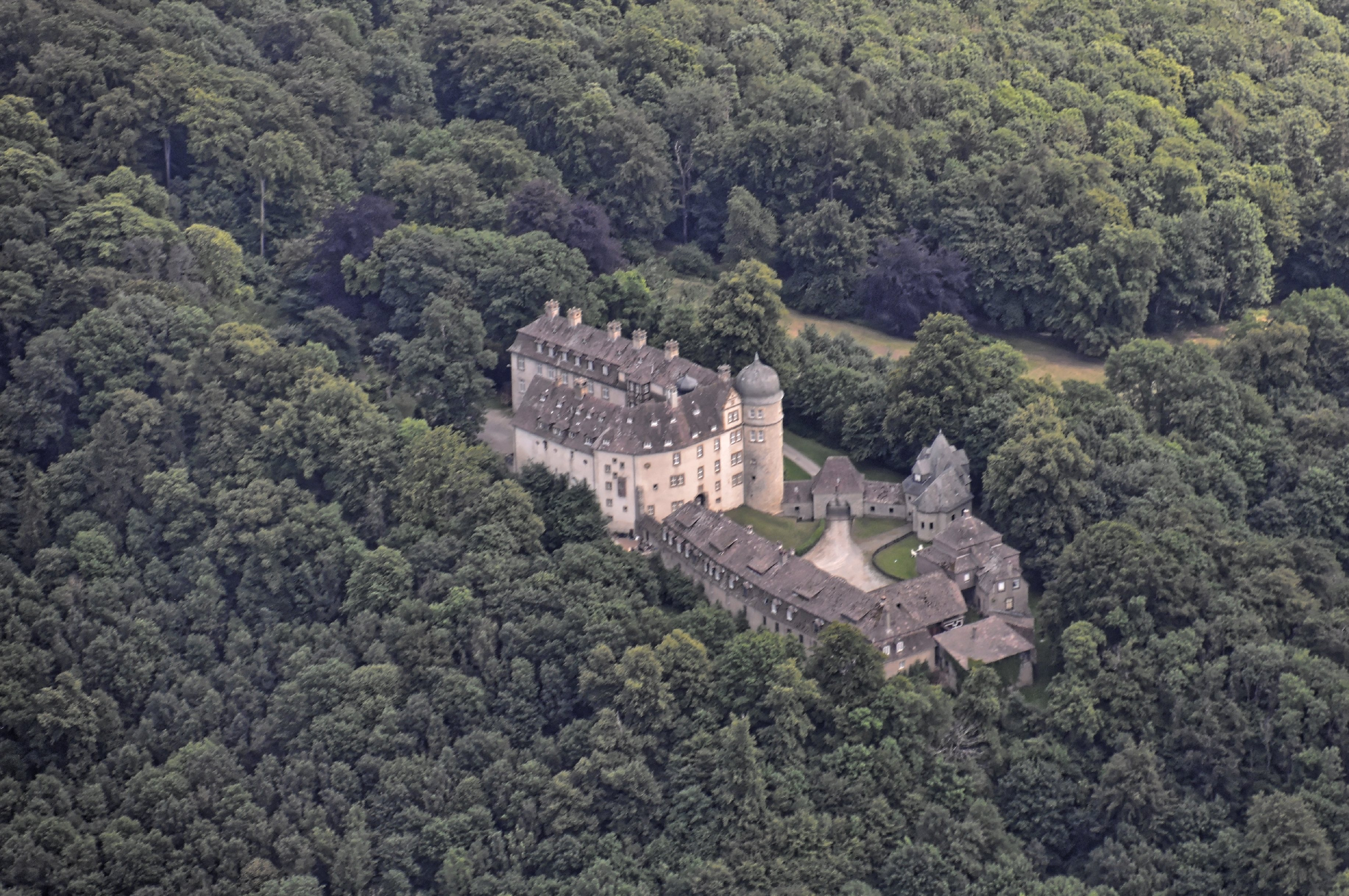
Hinnenburg Castle near Brakel

From the mid 13th century on, two branches of the Asseburg family emerged: an elder Eastphalian-Thuringian branch and a younger Westphalian branch. The former had its initial seat at Moringen Castle, later also at Ampfurth near Oschersleben. In 1437, Falkenstein Castle in the Lower Harz was acquired as an enfeoffment of the bishops of Halberstadt. In 1509, Wallhausen was also acquired, initially as an enfeoffment of the County of Mansfeld, later of the Electorate of Saxony. Meisdorf House near Falkenstein later became the permanent residence of the branch, while Falkenstein Castle was used for hunting parties.

The Westphalian branch inherited Hinnenburg Castle near Brakel from the lords of Brakel in the late 13th century. They bore the title Baron (Freiherr) under customary law. The medieval castle was reconstructed around 1600 in the Weser Renaissance style. This younger (catholic) branch died out in the 16th century with its property inherited by the elder (Protestant) branch. During the 17th century, a new Westphalian line emerged from it, becoming catholic again, of which William Anton of Asseburg (1707–1782) was the most notable member. Between 1763 and 1782 he ruled as Prince-Bishop of Paderborn. Shortly later, this new Westphalian line died out, too. The name was perpetuated, however, by the marriage in 1793 of its heiress to a Lord of Bocholtz (originally from Bocholt near Lobberich) who, in 1803, was created count of Bocholtz-Asseburg.

The Eastphalian-Thuringian (Lutheran) branch of Ampfurth-Falkenstein was granted the primogeniture title count of Asseburg-Falkenstein in 1840. Its last male offspring, Friedrich (1861–1940), left his estate to his eldest daughter, Oda (1888–1928), who married count Leonhard von Rothkirch-Trach of an old Silesian family. Their son Lothar (1914–1984) took on the name count von der Asseburg-Falkenstein-Rothkirch. In 1945 Falkenstein Castle, Wallhausen Castle and Meisdorf House were seized and expropriated in the Soviet occupation zone. Lothar's son Friedrich (1952–2013) however was adopted in 1959 by the last count of Bocholtz-Asseburg, Busso (1909–1985). He became catholic and inherited Hinnenburg Castle (among others) and the vast forest property of the Westphalian line. He was succeeded by his only son Louis, count von der Asseburg-Rothkirch (b. 2003).

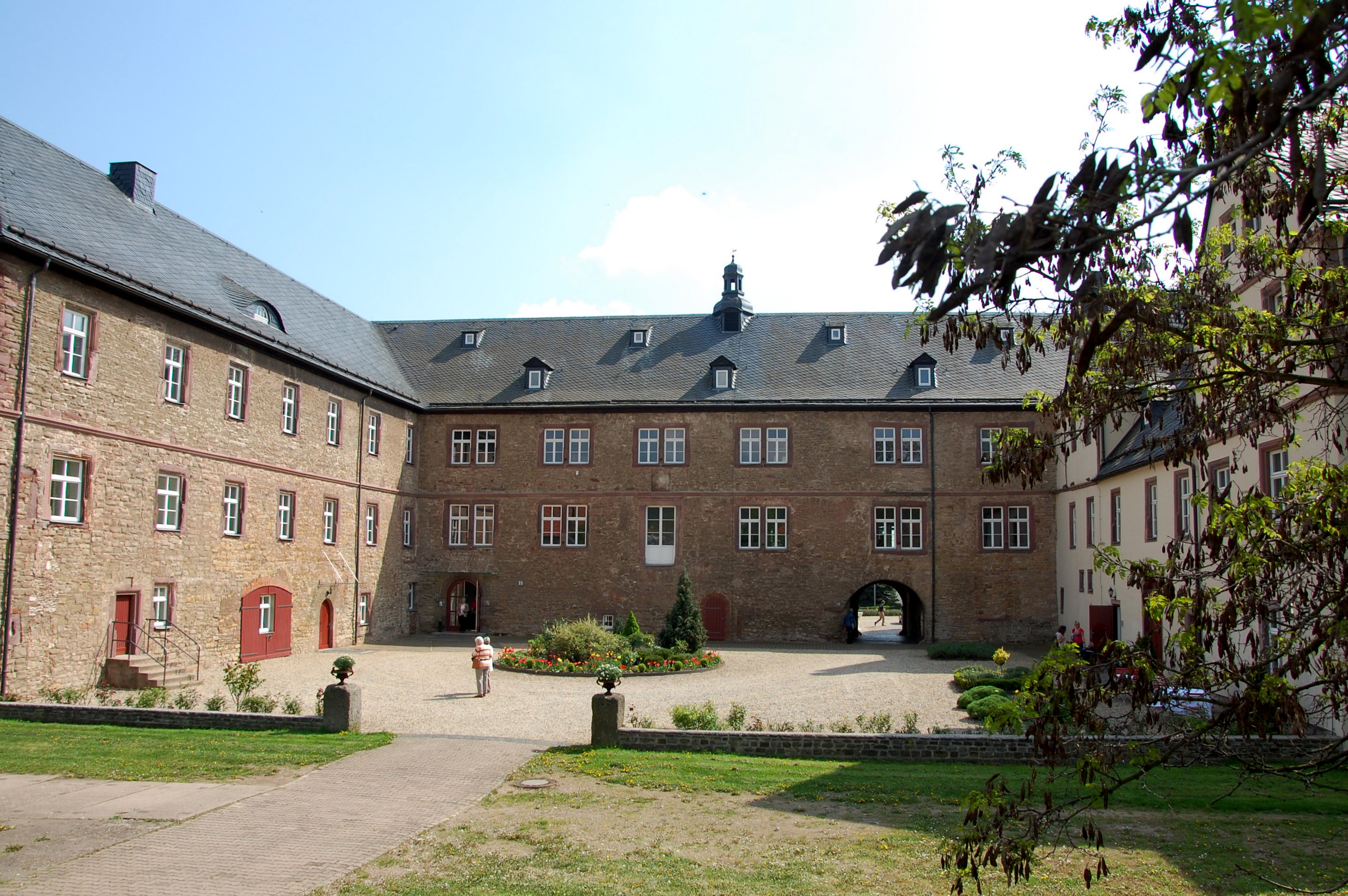
Wallhausen Castle

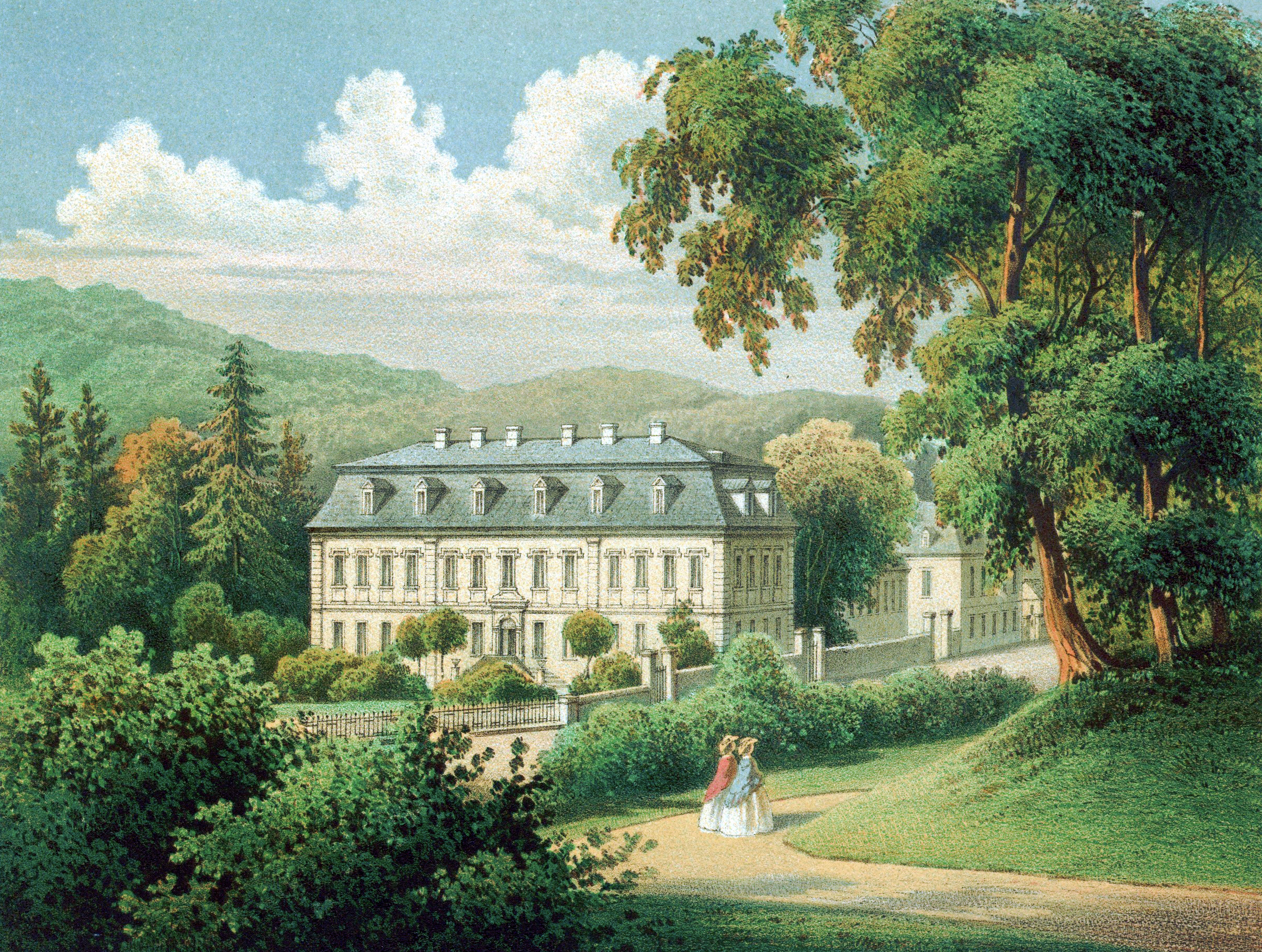
Meisdorf House

== Coat of arms ==
The family coat of arms depicts a black wolf couchant on a gold field. On the crowned helm is a red column with an embedded gold mirror, bedecked with nine natural peacock feathers. The mantling is black and gold.

== Members ==
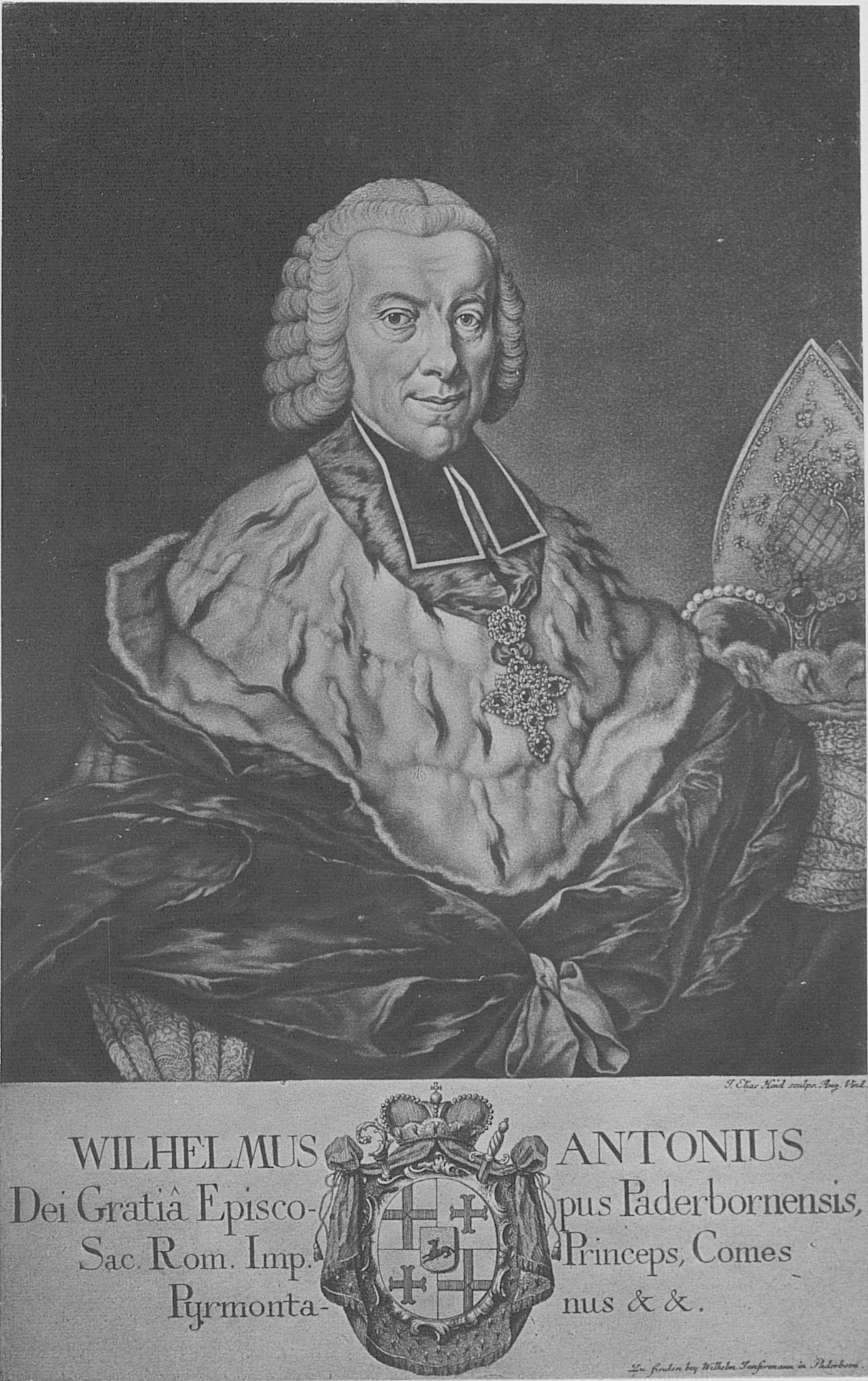
William Anton of Asseburg (1707–1782), Prince-Bishop of Paderborn

- Achatz Ferdinand von der Asseburg (1721 –1797), diplomat
- Anna, Countess of the Asseburg (1830–1905), ruler of the Barony of Neudek
- Frederick von der Asseburg (Teutonic Knight) (Frederick von der Asseburg auf Hindenburg; † 1704), knight of the Teutonic Order
- Frederick, Count of the Asseburg (1861–1940), Prussian officer and chamberlain (‘’Kammerherr’’)
- Gunzelin von Wolfenbüttel (also Gunzelin of the Asseburg) (ca. 1170–1255), ministerialis from the line of Wolfenbüttel-Asseburg
- Herman Werner von der Asseburg (1702–1779), leading minister in the Electorate of Cologne
- Louis, Count of the Asseburg (1796 –1869), lord of the minor county (‘’Mindergrafschaft’’) of Falkenstein
- Moritz William von der Asseburg (1698 –1780), Prussian major general
- Rosamunde Juliane von der Asseburg (1672 –1712), visionary and prophetess of the early pietism
- Widekind of Wolfenbüttel (after 1089–ca. 1118), built the water castle of Wolfenbüttel and founded the line of Wolfenbüttel-Asseburg
- William Anton of Asseburg (1707 –1782), Prince-bishop of Paderborn (1763–82)

== Literature ==
- Johann Bernhard Count von Bocholtz-Asseburg: Asseburger Urkundenbuch. 3 volumes, Hanover 1876, 1887 and 1905. (Neudruck: Wenner, Osnabrück 1975, ISBN 3-87898-164-3)
- Genealogisches Handbuch des Adels, Adelslexikon Vol. I, Part 53 of the whole range, C. A. Starke Verlag, Limburg (Lahn), 1972, ISSN 0435-2408
- Otto Hupp: Münchener Kalender 1923. Buch u. Kunstdruckerei, Munich/ Regensburg, 1923.
- Ernst Heinrich Kneschke: Neues allgemeines deutsches Adels-Lexicon. Vol. 1, Frederick Voigt's Buchhandlung, Leipzig 1859, p. 127. (digitalised)
- Leopold von Zedlitz-Neukirch: Neues preussisches Adelslexicon. Vol. 1, Gebrüder Reichenbach, Leipzig, 1836, p. 147. (digitalised)
- Leopold von Zedlitz-Neukirch: Neues preussisches Adelslexicon. Supplement – Vol. 2, Gebrüder Reichenbach, Leipzig, 1843, p. 5. (digitalised)
