= Winterfeld (disambiguation) =

Winterfeld is a village in Germany.

Winterfeld is also a surname of German origin. Notable people with the surname include:

- Carl von Winterfeld (1784–1852), German lawyer and musicologist
- Henry Winterfeld (1901–1990), German writer and artist
- Max Winterfeld (1879–1942), German operetta composer and conductor
