= Rosamunde Juliane von der Asseburg =

German visionary and prophetess

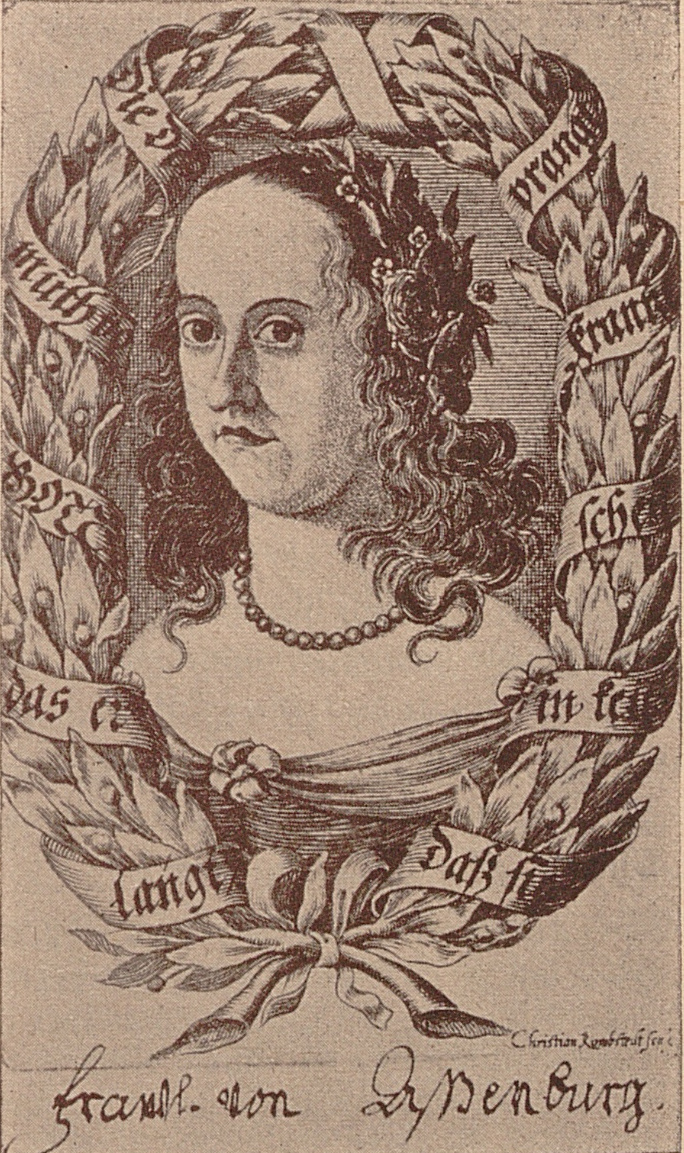
Engraved portrait (undated)

Rosamunde Juliane von der Asseburg (1672–1712) was a German religious visionary and prophetess associated with the onset of Pietism.

== Life ==
=== Origins ===
Rosamunde was born in Eggenstedt in 1672 into the noble Saxon family of Asseburg. Her parents were Christian Christoph von der Asseburg and Gertrud Margarete von Alvensleben. Her father died in 1675, leaving her mother with seven surviving children out of ten in financial distress. The property in Eggenstedt was auctioned off despite a six-year delay. The widow probably moved to Magdeburg with her children in 1682.

=== Visions ===
Asseburg is said to have had visions of Christ and the Devil since she was seven. She had a particular vision at the age of seven of a beautifully adorned virgin approaching her. When she was ten or twelve years old, she experienced a calling similar to that of the prophet Samuel (1 Samuel 3:9). At fifteen, she boasted special revelations about the end times and the millennium.

=== Life with Petersen ===
In 1691 the impoverished family moved to Lüneburg. The superintendent there, who was later relieved of office, Johann Wilhelm Petersen, believed he felt a blessing in the presence of the young enthusiast:

As some time ago, through several witnesses who are as godly as they are not silly, we often got news from a certain place about a noble house, where a widow and three daughters live in great silence and solitude, because one of them has amazing revelations, because when her eyes are open and her senses are full, her Saviour appears to her several times, so that she is beside herself and one hears nothing but hallelujah, hosanna and words of joy from her.

From 1691, Asseburg lived in the house of Petersen, who published her visions in his letters. Petersen believed the Grace and presence of the Lord present in his home: "Rosamunde's face is said to have 'shone so brightly that it even shone through the cracks in the wall'".

According to Markus Matthias, she "exerted a remarkable edifying and pastoral effect on some people with her testimonies". Her revelations testified to nothing new and usually only reproduced the Biblical word in different variations "in a somewhat curious guise".

=== Later life and death ===
Asseburg later became acquainted with Marie Sophie von Reichenbach, who invited her to her estate in Jahnishausen, near Dresden, and even gave her a final resting place in the family burial grounds of the Friesens in Schönfeld near Pillnitz.
