= Apenburg-Winterfeld =

- Municipality
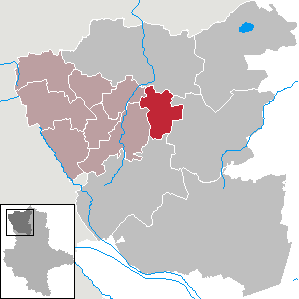
- Location of Apenburg-Winterfeld within Altmarkkreis Salzwedel district
- Interactive map of Apenburg-Winterfeld
- Location within Germany Location within Saxony-Anhalt
- Coordinates: 52°44′N 11°13′E
- Country: Germany
- State: Saxony-Anhalt
- District: Altmarkkreis Salzwedel
- Municipal assoc.: Beetzendorf-Diesdorf

Government
  - Mayor (2018–25): Ninett Schneider

Area
  - Total: 59.31 km^{2} (22.90 sq mi)
- Elevation: 35 m (115 ft)

Population (2025-12-31)
  - Total: 1,629
  - Density: 27.47/km^{2} (71.14/sq mi)
- Time zone: UTC+01:00 (CET)
  - Summer (DST): UTC+02:00 (CEST)
- Postal codes: 38486
- Dialling codes: 039001, 039009, 039035
- Vehicle registration: SAW, GA, KLZ
- Website: www.apenburg.de

Apenburg-Winterfeld is a municipality in the district Altmarkkreis Salzwedel, in Saxony-Anhalt, Germany. It was formed by the merger of the previously independent municipalities Apenburg, Winterfeld and Altensalzwedel, on 1 July 2009.
