= Altensalzwedel =

- Ortsteil of Apenburg-Winterfeld
- Interactive map of Altensalzwedel
- Location within Germany Location within Saxony-Anhalt
- Coordinates: 52°46′11″N 11°10′46″E
- Country: Germany
- State: Saxony-Anhalt
- District: Altmarkkreis Salzwedel
- Town: Apenburg-Winterfeld

Area
  - Total: 16.11 km^{2} (6.22 sq mi)
- Elevation: 29 m (95 ft)

Population (2006-12-31)
  - Total: 376
  - Density: 23.3/km^{2} (60.4/sq mi)
- Time zone: UTC+01:00 (CET)
  - Summer (DST): UTC+02:00 (CEST)
- Postal codes: 29416
- Dialling codes: 039035
- Vehicle registration: SAW

Altensalzwedel is a village and a former municipality in the district Altmarkkreis Salzwedel, in Saxony-Anhalt, Germany. Since 1 July 2009, it is part of the municipality Apenburg-Winterfeld.
