= William Anton of Asseburg =

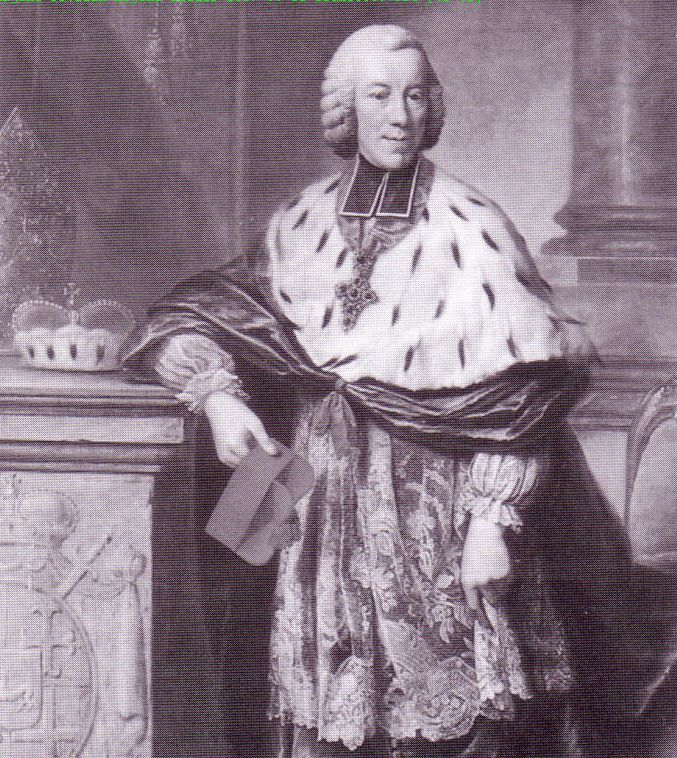
Bishop Wilhelm Anton; detail from a painting by Anton Joseph Stratmann

Wilhelm Anton Freiherr von der Asseburg (16 February 1707 – 26 December 1782) was a German clergyman and Prince-Bishop for the Roman Catholic Archdiocese of Paderborn. He was ordained in 1763 and appointed bishop in 1763.

== Early life ==
Von der Asseburg was born into the House of Asseburg on 16 February 1707 at Hinnenburg Castle near Brakel in the Oberwaldischer district of the Bishopric of Paderborn, which he would later head as Prince-Bishop.

== Career ==
He was appointed canon of the cathedral in Münster in 1737 and in Paderborn in 1744. He was also a canon in Osnabrück and headed the official court there from 1740. In 1754 he took over the office of Osnabrück Cathedral provost in order to lead the government as prefect.

On 25 January 1763, the Paderborn Cathedral chapter elected him Bishop. The Bishop's seat there had been vacated by the death of Clemens August on 6 February 1761 during the Seven Years' War, and the diocese was threatened with secularization. The Anglo-Prussian coalition had initially prevented a new election. The Bishop and the Cathedral Chapter of the friendly diocese of Le Mans intervened with the French King Louis XV, thereby preventing the dissolution of the diocese. A "bond of eternal brotherhood" had existed between the two dioceses since 836, which secured the endangered existence of the diocese of Paderborn as early as the Peace of Westphalia. Wilhelm Anton was ordained Bishop by Auxiliary Bishop Joseph Franz, Graf von Gondola in Paderborn Cathedral on 26 June 1763. After the Bishop's departure, he did not appoint a successor, but carried out the necessary ordination ceremonies himself. The new ruler took over the administration of a principality that was a constant theater of war during the Seven Years' War, as a result of which the impoverished population suffered in a devastated country and a depressed economy.

In 1769 he initiated the founding of the Fire Insurance Company in Paderborn, which is considered to be one of the first solidarity funds. In 1770 he opened the first orphanage in the capital. From 1772 he had the "Paderbornische Intelligenzblatt" published. In 1773, after the Jesuit order was abolished by the Pope, he reorganized the University of Paderborn, took over the grammar school and the university under his direct supervision and one year later established additional chairs for law and the French language. In 1777, he founded the Paderborn Seminary to better support the future clergy.

In 1779, he agreed to the elevation of Corvey to a diocese. In doing so, he ended the old dispute over whether the former Princely Abbey belonged to the Diocese of Paderborn.

== Personal life ==
Wilhelm Anton died on 26 December 1782 and was buried in the central aisle of Paderborn Cathedral. At his death, he left behind a Bishopric that was on the rise. He had already ordained his nephew and direct successor, Friedrich Wilhelm von Westphalen, as Bishop on 23 October 1763 in Hildesheim Cathedral. His contemporaries praised the deceased as "a good bishop and a good ruler."

Regnal titles
Preceded by Clemens August of Bavaria	Prince-Bishop of Paderborn; 1763–1782	Succeeded by Friedrich Wilhelm von Westphalen
