= Meisdorf House =

Château in Saxony-Anhalt, Germany

Coordinates: 51°42′13″N 11°17′14″E

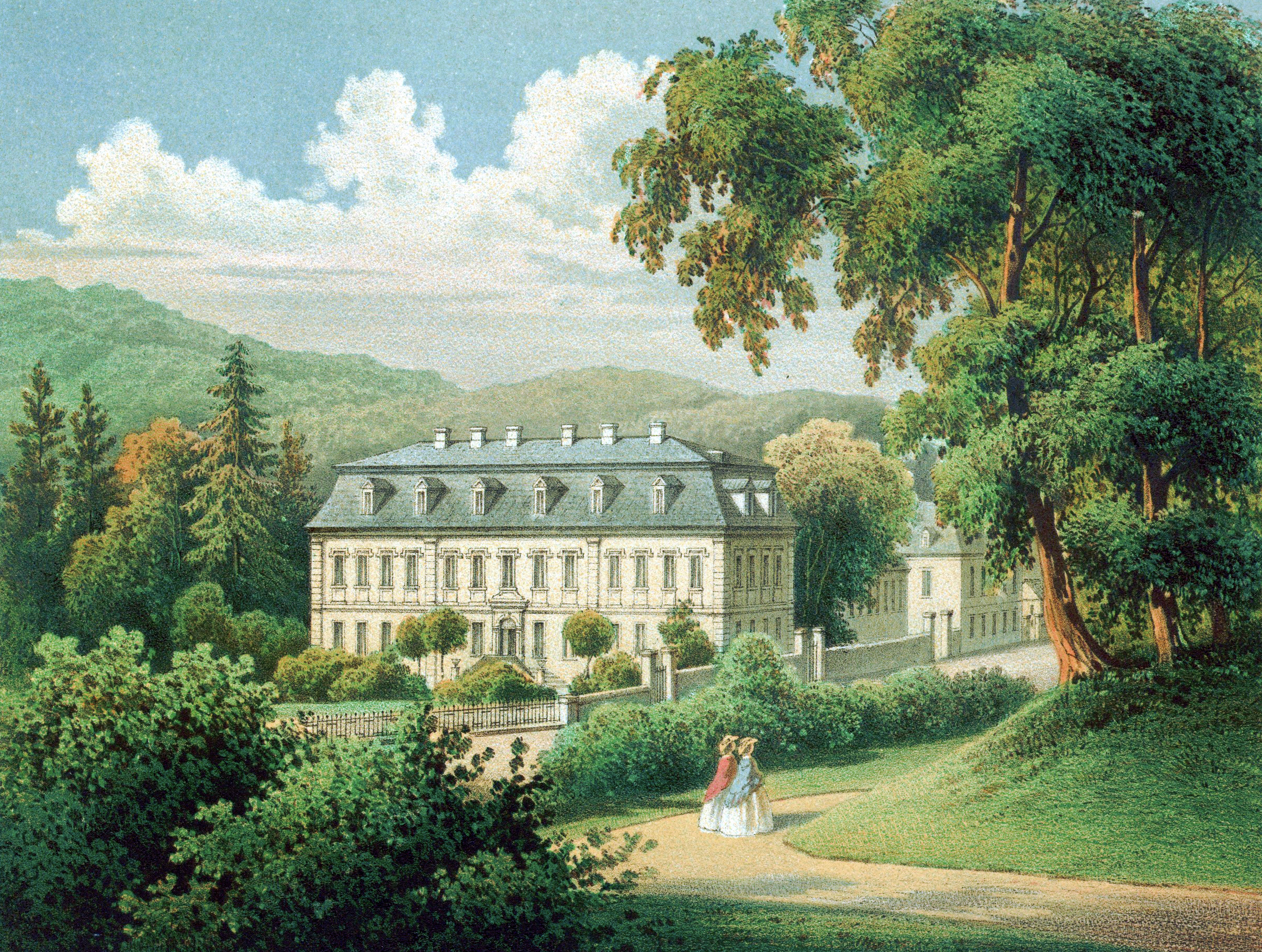
Meisdorf House around 1870 (Alexander Duncker collection).

Meisdorf House (German: Schloss Meisdorf) is a schloss in the village of Meisdorf in the borough of Falkenstein in the German federal state of Saxony-Anhalt, that is now used as a hotel. It was built in 1708 with a 12-hectare (30-acre) castle park.

== History ==
In the second half of the 18th century Meisdorf and the nearby Falkenstein Castle came into the possession of court official and diplomat, Achatz Ferdinand of Asseburg. Meisdorf had belonged to the seigneurie of Falkenstein since the middle age, and the latter to the House of Asseburg since 1437. As Falkenstein castle, at the time, was only used as a hunting lodge and the old Meisdorf manor had become too small for the needs of the lords, he built this new, more spacious, albeit simple residence in 1787, and had the existing house converted into an official's quarter. The new mansion, of which the facade faced away from the village Meisdorf, was linked with it through an avenue of lime and chestnut trees, 400 paces long.

After the death of its builder, who was buried, together with his family, in a baroque style mausoleum he had built in a hewn, with solid rock in the nearby Selke valley, the house became the property of the Neindorf line of the family of Asseburg. As this line expired in 1816, upon the death of the vicar capitular Louis Busso of Asseburg, the lordship of Falkenstein went to the Eggenstedt-Ampfurt line.

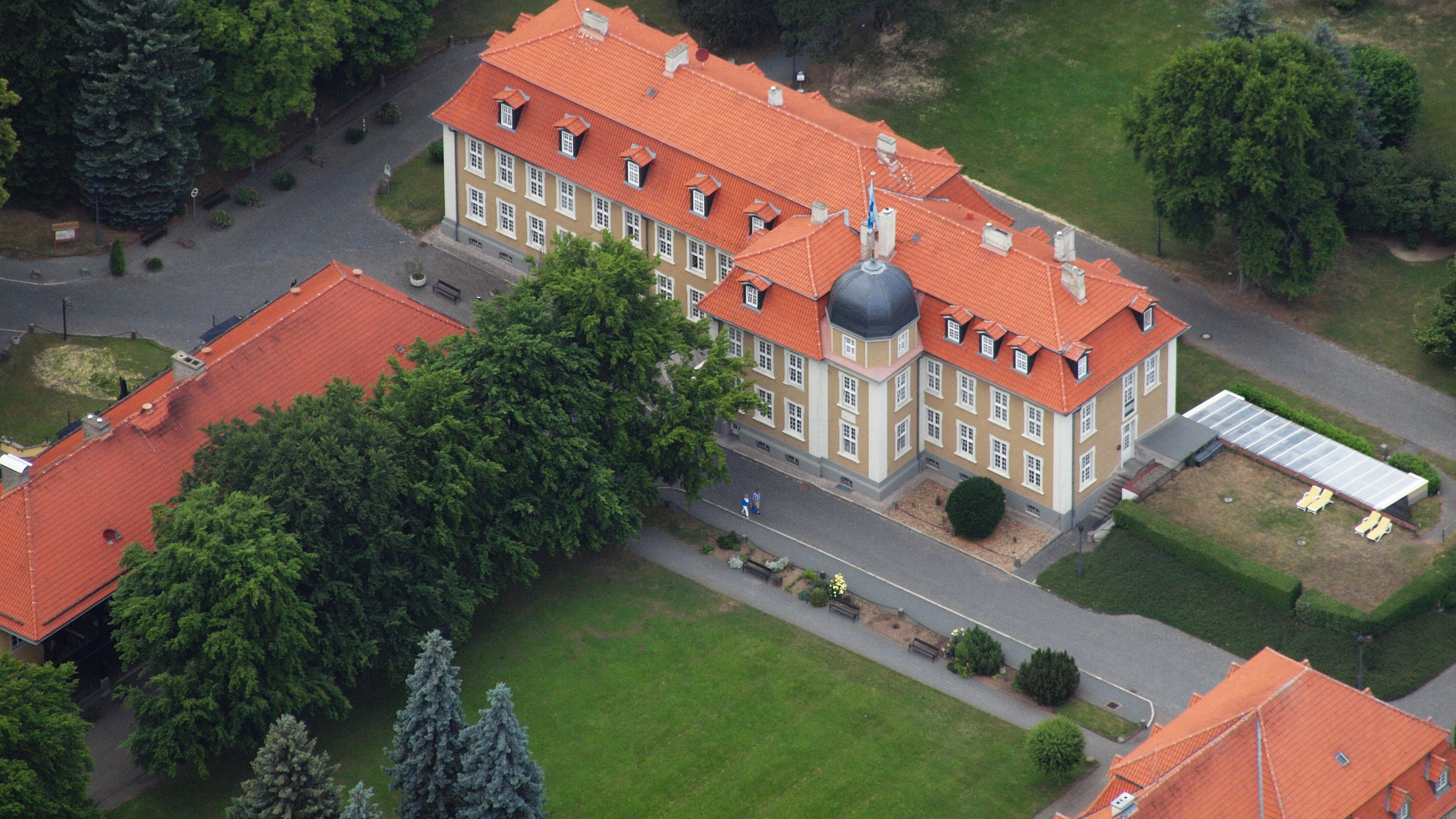
Meisdorf House

Later, the Prussian privy councillor and court hunter Louis, Count of Asseburg-Falkenstein, became its owner and had avenues created on both sides of the mansion towards Ballenstedt and Harzgerode. A large park and lush lawns surrounded the house at his time. In addition, there was a deciduous wood around the house, through which a road was built towards a neo-gothic sandstone mausoleum, and another to a Swiss Cottage on top of a hill above the house.

Closely behind the house, stables and gardens, there is the Selke valley.

The mill (Schlossmühle) in the grounds of the house and the family mausoleum (no. 207) are checkpoints in the Harzer Wandernadel hiking trail network.

In 1921/1922, the New Castle was remodeled by its owner, Friedrich Georg Deodat Count von der Asseburg-Falkenstein (1861–1940), based on plans by architect Max Brockert. During this renovation, a tower and side wing were added. Earlier, in 1910, he had already initiated initial modifications to the castle and converted the barn built in 1822 into residential units.

From 1944 to 1945, Meisdorf House served as a storage site for historical archival materials and documents from the Political Archive of the German Foreign Office in Berlin, and was designated as the main backup location. The holdings also included secret documents that had been moved from Friedland to Meisdorf, most of which were destroyed in April 1945 shortly before the end of the World War II.

In 1992, the castle and the buildings in the castle park were renovated and converted into a hotel complex following their privatization by the Ferdinand Lentjes Holding. In 2001, the Van der Valk Group took over the hotel complex. In July 2021, the hotel was sold to Bernstein Hotels & Resorts and was subsequently renovated and expanded.

== Sources ==
- Sammlung Duncker, Schloss Meisdorf (digital file)
