= Asseburg (castle) =

- Wittmar
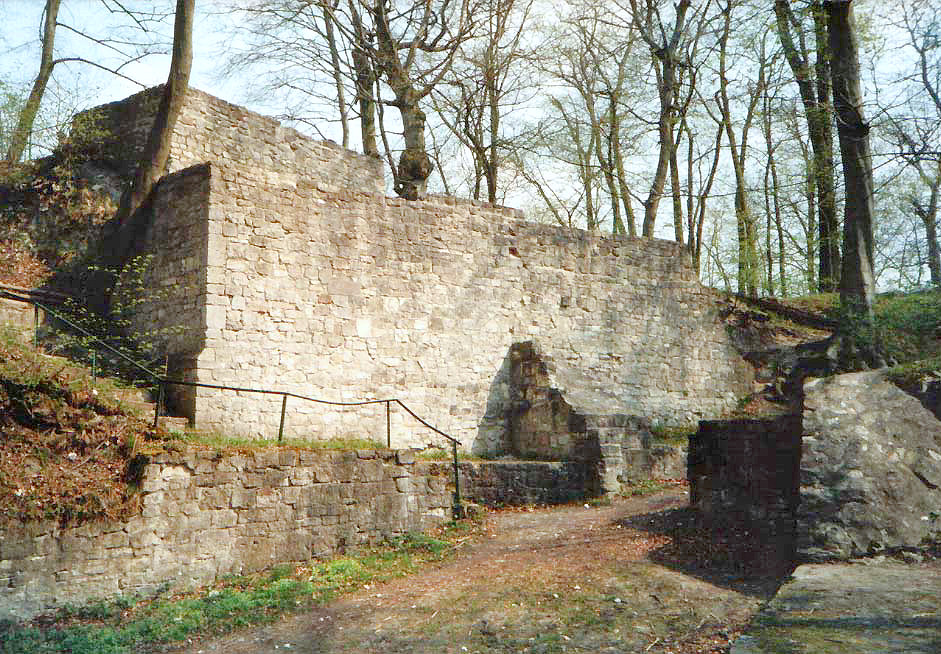
- Ruins of the Asseburg

Site information
- Type: hill castle
- Code: DE-NI
- Condition: ruin

Location
- Coordinates: 52°8′37″N 10°38′35″E

Site history
- Built: between 1218 and 1223

The Asseburg is a ruined hill castle on the narrow, southern crest of the Asse ridge in the Harz Mountains of Germany, not far from Wolfenbüttel.

== History ==
The castle was built around 1218 by Gunzelin of Wolfenbüttel and his descendants of the House of Asseburg, as a so-called Ganerbenburg, or castle managed and occupied by more than one family or branch. Based on its dimensions, this elongated fortification was the largest hill castle in North Germany and was considered impregnable. Its purpose was to secure the lands around Wolfenbüttel.

When Gunzelin refused to swear allegiance to Duke Albert I of Brunswick-Lüneburg, of the House of Welf, in 1255, the latter destroyed Gunzelin's Wolfenbüttel Castle and sieged Gunzelin's son Burchardus de Asseburc (Burchard or Busso of Asseburg) at Asseburg Castle. Burchard was able to withstand during three years, however in 1258 had to relinquish the castle to Duke Albert I. Burchard was then allowed to retreat to Westphalia with his knights, and received a compensation of 400 gold mark for the castle. After Gunzelin's death in 1260, his sons also lost the county of Peine to the bishop of Hildesheim.

Asseburg became one of the strongest fortresses in the duchy. In 1330 the dukes had to pledge the castle to the city of Brunswick, which was interested in securing the trade routes below. When Duke Henry IV asked the castle back in 1492, threatening another siege, the garrison set fire on the castle and left. It fell into ruins after it was abandoned.

== Literature ==
- Hans Adolf Schultz (1980), Burgen und Schlösser des Braunschweiger Landes (in German), Brunswick, ISBN 3-878840128
- Ulrich Schwarz, ed. (2003), Auf dem Weg zur herzoglichen Residenz Wolfenbüttel im Mittelalter (in German), Brunswick: Appelhans, ISBN 3-930292-86-6
- Friedrich-Wilhelm Krahe (1996), Burgen des deutschen Mittelalters (in German), Augsburg, ISBN 3-86047-219-4
- Ernst Andreas Friedrich: Die Ruine der Asseburg, S.116-117, in: Wenn Steine reden könnten, Vol. III, Landbuch-Verlag, Hanover, 1995, ISBN 3-7842-0515-1.
