= Apenburg =

- Ortsteil of Apenburg-Winterfeld
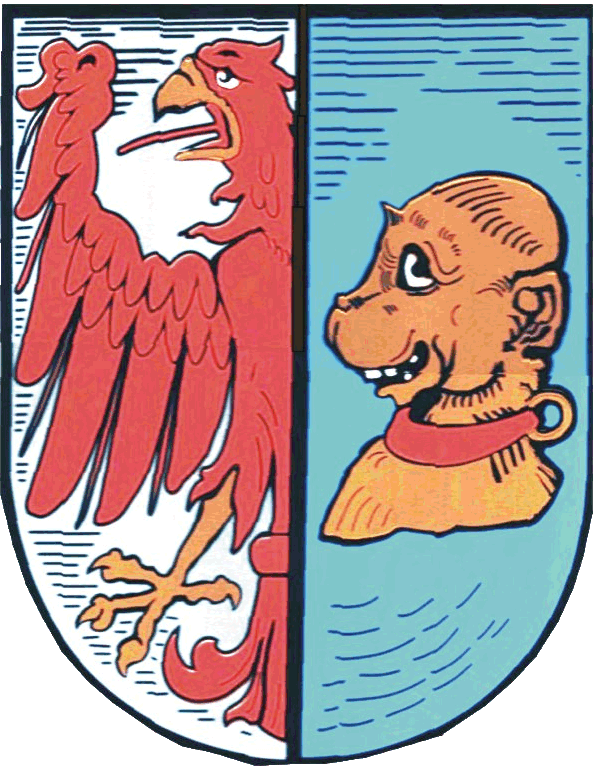
- Coat of arms
- Interactive map of Apenburg
- Location within Germany Location within Saxony-Anhalt
- Coordinates: 52°42′50″N 11°12′20″E
- Country: Germany
- State: Saxony-Anhalt
- District: Altmarkkreis Salzwedel
- Town: Apenburg-Winterfeld

Area
  - Total: 19.64 km^{2} (7.58 sq mi)
- Elevation: 34 m (112 ft)

Population (2006-12-31)
  - Total: 881
  - Density: 44.9/km^{2} (116/sq mi)
- Time zone: UTC+01:00 (CET)
  - Summer (DST): UTC+02:00 (CEST)
- Postal codes: 38486
- Dialling codes: 039001
- Vehicle registration: SAW
- Website: www.apenburg.de

Apenburg is a village and a former municipality in the district Altmarkkreis Salzwedel, in Saxony-Anhalt, Germany. Since 1 July 2009, it is part of the municipality Apenburg-Winterfeld.

== History ==
Apenburg became a town during the Middle Ages. Following World War II, it became part of East Germany.
