= Winterfeld =

- Ortsteil of Apenburg-Winterfeld
- Interactive map of Winterfeld
- Location within Germany Location within Saxony-Anhalt
- Coordinates: 52°44′24″N 11°14′48″E
- Country: Germany
- State: Saxony-Anhalt
- District: Altmarkkreis Salzwedel
- Town: Apenburg-Winterfeld

Area
  - Total: 23.55 km^{2} (9.09 sq mi)
- Elevation: 45 m (148 ft)

Population (2006-12-31)
  - Total: 606
  - Density: 25.7/km^{2} (66.6/sq mi)
- Time zone: UTC+01:00 (CET)
  - Summer (DST): UTC+02:00 (CEST)
- Postal codes: 38486
- Dialling codes: 039009
- Vehicle registration: SAW

Winterfeld is a village and a former municipality in the district Altmarkkreis Salzwedel, in Saxony-Anhalt, Germany. Since 1 July 2009, it is part of the municipality Apenburg-Winterfeld.

== History ==
This village was independent municipality until July 1, 2009.
