= Theodoric IV of Lusatia =

German noble

Theodoric IV, Landgrave of Lusatia
- Born: c. 1260
- Died: probably 10 December 1307; Leipzig
- Noble family: House of Wettin
- Spouse: Jutta of Henneberg
- Father: Albert II, Margrave of Meissen
- Mother: Margaret of Sicily

Theodoric IV, Landgrave of Lusatia, also called in German Diezmann, or Dietrich III (c. 1260 – probably 10 December 1307 in Leipzig) was a member of the House of Wettin. He was Margrave of Lusatia from 1291 to 1303. He was also Margrave of Osterland from 1291 until his death, and Landgrave of Thuringia, as Dietrich I, from 1298 until his death.

== Life ==
Theodoric was born in 1260, the third son of Margrave Albert II of Meissen and his wife Margaret of Sicily.

After Theodoric's mother fled from the Wartburg in 1270, because her husband had fallen in love with Kunigunde of Eisenberg, Theodoric and his elder brother Frederick were raised by their uncle Margrave Theodoric of Landsberg. After Theodoric and Frederick had come of age, they and their elder brother Henry fought a war against their father, who wanted his son Apitz, from his second marriage with Kunigunde, to inherit the Landgraviate of Thuringia.

Theodoric's first territorial possession was the Pleissnerland. After the death of Margrave Henry III in 1288, he inherited Lusatia and after the death of Frederick Tuta in 1291 he inherited the Osterland.

In 1301 Archbishop Burchard II of Magdeburg sold Theodoric the castles in Droyßig and Burgwerben for 2000 marks of Stendal silver, with the option to buy them back later. Burchard did not use this option; instead he also sold the castle and town of Spremberg to Theodoric.

In 1303, Theodoric sold Lusatia to the Margraviate of Brandenburg, which was ruled by the House of Ascania at the time.

Adolph of Nassau, the King of the Romans, deprived Theodoric of his inherited lands, but after Adolph's fall Theodoric was reinstated. In 1307, King Albert I of Germany invaded the Osterland with a large army. Theodoric and his brother Frederick armed civilians and peasants and with some assistance from knights from Brunswick they defeated Albert in the Battle of Lucka on 31 May 1307.

Theodoric died in December 1307 in Leipzig. According to later traditions, he was murdered on 24 or 25 December by one Philip of Nassau in the St. Thomas church in Leipzig. However, it is more likely that he died of natural causes on 10 December.

== Marriage ==
Theodoric married in 1295 Jutta, a daughter of Count Berthold VIII of Henneberg. This marriage did not produce an heir. Jutta later married Otto IV, Margrave of Brandenburg-Stendal.

Theodoric IV of Lusatia House of Wettin Born: c. 1260 Died: probably 10 December 1307
Preceded by Frederick Tuta	Margrave of Lusatia; 1291-1303	Succeeded by Otto IV as Margrave of Brandenburg
