= Battle of Lucka =

1307 battle

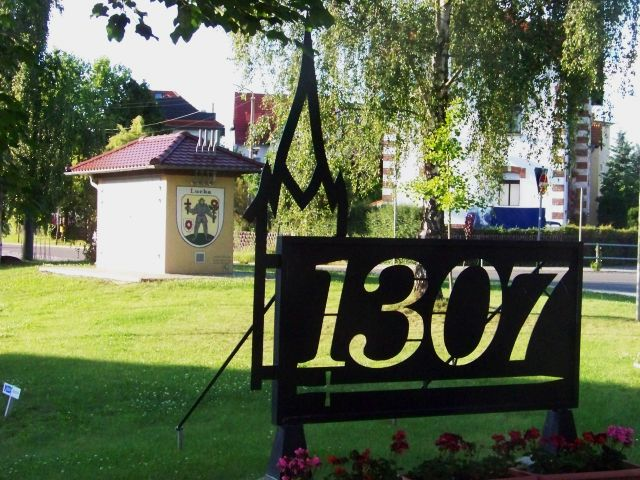
- Battle memorial in Lucka
Date	31 May 1307
Location	Lucka, present-day Thuringia, Germany
Result	Wettin victory

Belligerents
Holy Roman Empire	Margraviate of Meissen

Commanders and leaders
Albert I of Habsburg; Frederick IV of Hohenzollern	Frederick I of Wettin

The Battle of Lucka occurred on 31 May 1307 near the village of Lucka. The settlement was first mentioned in 1320, but had already existed for around 700 years before that. Lucka is located in the Altenburger Land district of Thuringia.

The battle was fought between German king Albert I of the Habsburg dynasty and Frederick I, Margrave of Meissen, from the House of Wettin over the disputed ownership of the decedent estates left by Henry III the Illustrious, Margrave of Meissen and Lusatia and Landgrave of Thuringia.

Within the disorder of the Great Interregnum after the end of the Hohenstaufen rule, Henry in 1261 had established the Margraviate of Landsberg in western Lusatia for his younger son Dietrich, however without any royal authorization. Dietrich of Landsberg himself left one son, Frederick Tuta, who also inherited the Lusatian march upon Henry's death in 1288, while his uncle Albert II the Degenerate at first retained Meissen and Thuringia. Shortly afterwards he sold Meissen to his nephew Frederick Tuta, who then had united most of the Wettin lands under his rule, but died without heirs in 1291.

Frederick I of Meissen, eldest son of Albert II, and his younger brother Dietrich IV claimed Frederick Tuta's territories, which met with opposition not only from their father Albert II but also from King Adolf of Germany, who regarded them as reverted fiefs. In 1294 Albert II sold Thuringia to King Adolf, again facing fierce protest of his sons who felt deprived of their heritage. After a feud with their father they were able to take Wettin lands including Thuringia upon King Adolf's deposition in 1298.

The long-term dispute continued under Adolf's successor King Albert I of Habsburg, who tried to get the possession of the "reverted" Wettin lands and in 1307 started a campaign against Frederick I. Their troops met at Lucka, where the royal army fought under the command of Burgrave Frederick IV of Hohenzollern, but was finally defeated. This victory guaranteed the continuation of the House of Wettin. Today, the citizens of Lucka believe that their city received its town charter as a result of this victory.
