= Albert II of Meissen =

Albert II
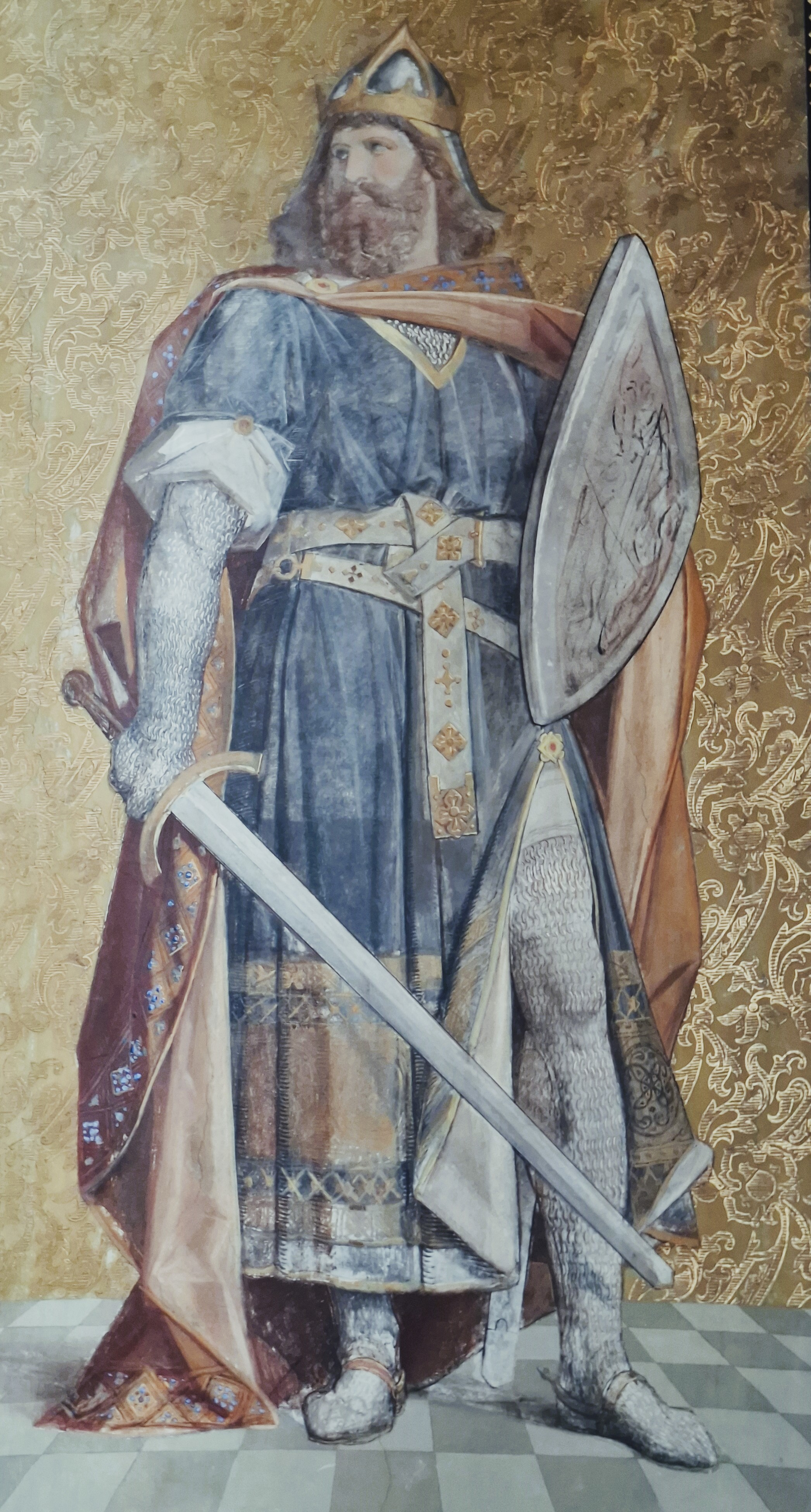
- Albert II. Wall painting by Anton Dietrich (1833–1904) in Albrechtsburg, Meissen.

Margrave of Meissen
- Reign: 1288–1292
- Predecessor: Henry III
- Successor: Frederick Tuta

Landgrave of Thuringia
- Reign: 1265–1294
- Predecessor: Henry III
- Successor: Adolf

Count Palatine of Saxony
- Reign: 1265–1292
- Predecessor: Henry III
- Successor: Frederick I
- Born: 1240; Meissen, Duchy of Saxony, Holy Roman Empire
- Died: 20 November 1314 (aged 73–74); Erfurt, Duchy of Saxe-Wittenberg, Holy Roman Empire
- Spouse: Margaret of Sicily; Kunigunde of Eisenberg; Elisabeth of Orlamünde
- Issue: Henry, Lord of Pleissner; Frederick I, Margrave of Meissen; Dietrich IV, Landgrave of Lusatia; Margaret; Agnes, Duchess of Brunswick-Grubenhagen; Elisabeth; Apitz
Names
- Albert Henrich
- House: Wettin
- Father: Henry III, Margrave of Meissen
- Mother: Constantia of Austria

Albert II, known as Albert the Degenerate (German: Albrecht der Entartete; c. 1240 – 20 November 1314), was Margrave of Meissen, Landgrave of Thuringia and Count Palatine of Saxony. He was a member of the House of Wettin.

He was the eldest son of Henry III, Margrave of Meissen, and his first wife, Constantia of Austria.

== Life ==
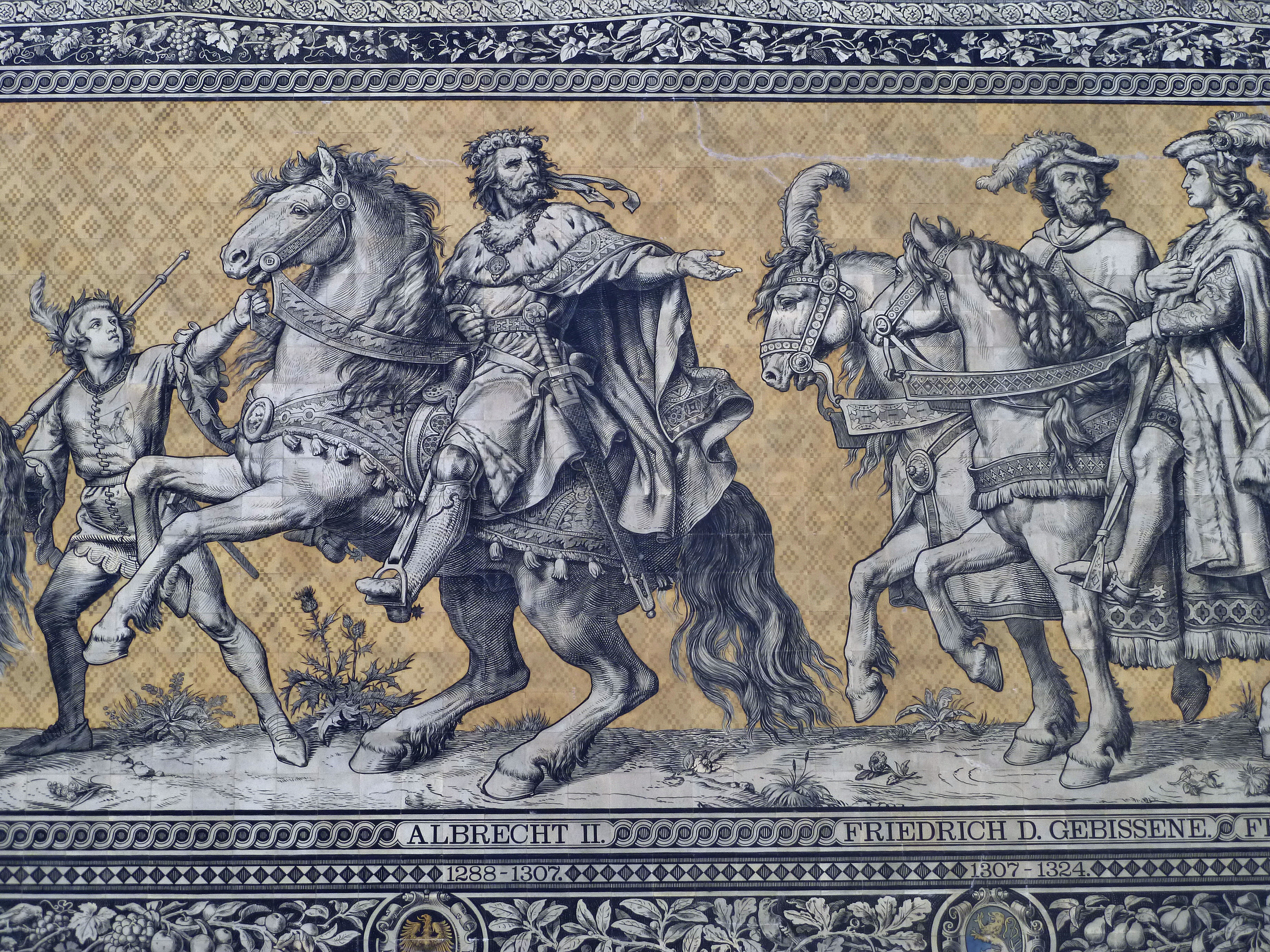
Albert II, Margrave of Meissen, and Frederick I, Margrave of Meissen; Fürstenzug, Dresden, Germany

In 1265, Henry III, Margrave of Meissen granted the Landgraviate of Thuringia and the County Palatine to his son Albert, while assigning the Margraviate of Landsberg in the Osterland to his younger son Dietrich. Henry III retained the Margraviates of Meissen and Lusatia as a formal overlordship over his sons.

In 1255, Albert married Margaret of Sicily, daughter of Emperor Frederick II and his third wife, Isabella of England. As part of the marriage settlement, the Pleissnerland was pledged to the House of Wettin.

After what was at first a happy rule and marriage, Albert turned away from Margaret and began a passionate love affair with Kunigunde of Eisenberg. They had two children: a daughter, Elisabeth in 1269, and a son, Albert ("Apitz") in 1270.

When she discovered the adultery and the illegitimate births, Margaret left Wartburg on 24 June 1270 and went to Frankfurt am Main where she died on 8 August of the same year. The two younger sons, Frederick and Diezmann were looked after by their uncle, Theodoric of Landsberg. Henry, the oldest, disappeared in Silesia in 1282.

Albert married Kunigunde in 1274 and legitimised their children. When Albert intended to leave the Landgraviate of Thuringia to Apitz and compensate his sons from his first marriage with only the Osterland (which included the inheritance from their mother) and the County Palatine of Saxony, they began a war against their father. Frederick was captured by his father and was locked up in Wartburg castle; however, he escaped one year later and continued the war against his father together with Diezmann. During this time, in 1284, their uncle Theodoric of Landsberg died, and four years later, in 1288, Henry the Illustrious, Albert's father, also died. These deaths heightened the family disputes.

At the death of his father, Albert became Margrave of Meissen, while his nephew Frederick Tuta - son of Theodoric of Landsberg - inherited the Margraviate of Lusatia, which was sold off by Albert's son Diezmann in 1303. Shortly after, Frederick captured his father Albert in battle. By the Treaty of Rochlitz (1 January 1289), Albert obtained his freedom after the renunciation of large parts of his lands. He retained Meissen for himself, but later sold it to Frederick Tuta. When, after his death (1291) his cousins Frederick and Diezmann arbitrarily took possession of his lands, Albert - suffering financial difficulties - was compelled to sell Thuringia in 1293 to the German King Adolf of Nassau; in the contract, it was stipulated that the king could take possession of the lands after Albert's death. In the sale, Albert included Meissen and Osterland as his fiefs, despite the fact they were in the hands of his sons. Thanks to this, Adolf's successor Albert I of Habsburg was able to take possession of these lands, claiming that the contract of sale was legitimate and lawful.

Kunigunde of Eisenberg died on 31 October 1286. Four years later, on 1 October 1290, Albert married thirdly Elisabeth of Orlamünde, heiress of Nordhalben and widow of Hartmann XI of Lobdeburg-Arnshaugk. The same year, Apitz, Albert's son by Kunigunde, was formally legitimized by the Emperor and created Herr of Tenneberg. He wished to make Apitz his successor in Thuringia, but the plan was resisted by his two elder sons.

On 11 April 1291 Apitz's younger full-sister, Elisabeth, married Henry III of Frankenstein; the marriage was short-lived and childless. Elisabeth died on 28 September 1293.

Three years later (9 October 1296), Apitz married a sister of his brother-in-law Henry III, apparently also called Elisabeth. This marriage, like his sister's, was childless.

Four years later (24 August 1300) Albert's eldest surviving son, Frederick, married Elisabeth of Lobdeburg-Arnshaugk, daughter of his stepmother; this caused the final reconciliation between father and son. Five years later (27 June 1305) Apitz of Tenneberg died, aged thirty-five. The death of his favorite son was a terrible blow to Albert. He never recovered from the loss.

Two years later, in 1307, Albert finally resigned the Landgraviate of Thuringia and the County Palatine of Saxony to his son Frederick in exchange for an annuity. He died seven years later in Erfurt, aged seventy-four.

== Family ==
Albert and Margaret had five children:

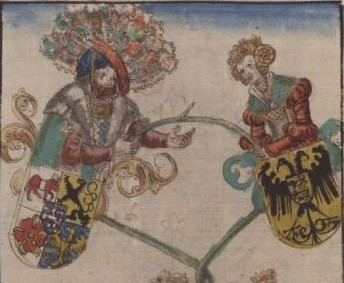
Albert and Margaret

1. Henry (1256–1282), inherited the Pleissnerland in 1274; married Hedwig, daughter of Henry III the White; died between 25 January and 23 July 1282.
2. Frederick (1257–1323), Margrave of Meissen; died at Wartburg Castle on 16 November 1323.
3. Theodoric (1260–1307), called Diezmann, Margrave of Lusatia; murdered at Leipzig on 10 December 1307.
4. Margaret (1262–after 1273), died young.
5. Agnes of Meissen (1264–1332); married by 21 July 1282 to Henry I, Duke of Brunswick-Grubenhagen.

== See also ==
- List of Margraves of Meißen
- Wettin (dynasty)

== Sources ==
- Arnold, Benjamin (1989). "England and Germany, 1050-1350". In Jones, Michael; Vale, Malcolm (eds.). England and her Neighbours, 1066-1453: Essays in Honour of Pierre Chaplais. The Hambledon Press. pp. 43–52. ISBN 1-852850-14-0.

Albert II of Meissen House of Wettin
Preceded by Henry III	Margrave of Meissen; 1265–1314	Succeeded by Frederick I
Landgrave of Thuringia; 1265–1293	Succeeded by Frederick I	
