= Frederick I of Meissen =

Margrave of Meissen from 1291 to 1323

Frederick I
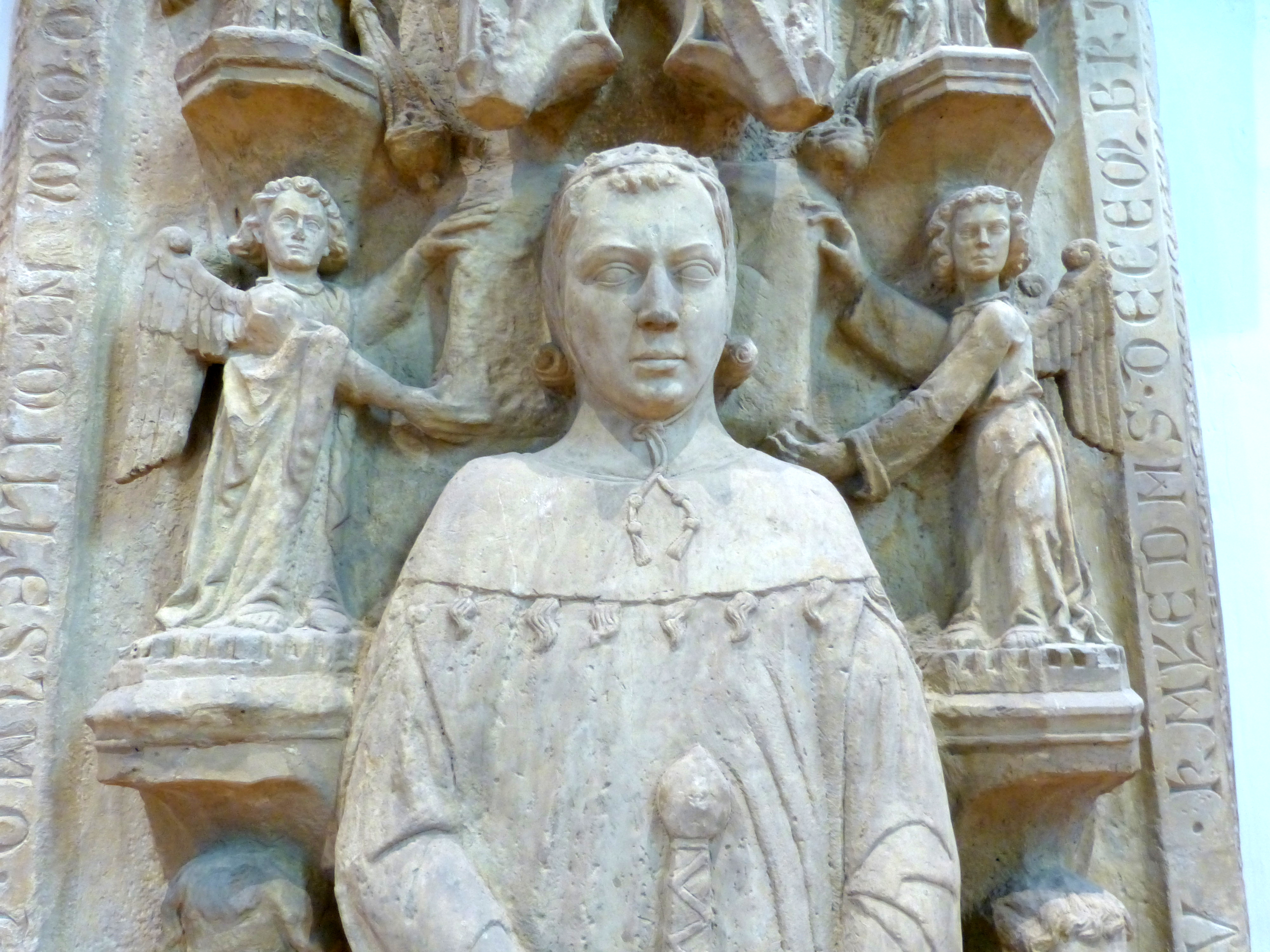
- Grave slab of Landgrave Frederick the Brave (Parish Church of St. George, Eisenach, Thuringia; 14th century).

Margrave of Meissen
- Reign: 1291–1323
- Predecessor: Frederick Tuta
- Successor: Frederick II

Landgrave of Thuringia
- Reign: 1298–1323
- Predecessor: Diezmann
- Successor: Frederick II

Count Palatine of Saxony
- Reign: 1280–1292

King of Jerusalem and Sicily
- Claimed: 1269–?
- Predecessor: Conradin
- Successor: None

Duke of Swabia
- Claimed: 1269–?
- Predecessor: Conradin
- Successor: None
- Born: 1257; Wartburg, Eisenach, Duchy of Saxony, Holy Roman Empire
- Died: 16 November 1323 (aged 65–66); Eisenach, Duchy of Saxe-Wittenberg, Holy Roman Empire
- Spouse: Agnes of Gorizia-Tyrol; Elizabeth of Lobdeburg-Arnshaugk
- Issue: Frederick the Lame; Elizabeth, Landgravine of Hesse; Frederick II, Margrave of Meissen
- House: Wettin
- Father: Albert II, Margrave of Meissen
- Mother: Margaret of Sicily

Frederick I, known as the Brave, the Bitten or the Cheek-Bitten (German: Friedrich der Freidige; Friedrich der Gebissene; mit der gebissenen Wange; 1257 – 16 November 1323), was Margrave of Meissen, Landgrave of Thuringia and Count Palatine of Saxony.

In 1269, following the death of Conradin, he styled himself as 'Frederick III, King of Jerusalem and Sicily, Duke of Swabia, Landgrave of Thuringia, and Count Palatine of Saxony,' thereby asserting his claim as the cognatic successor of his grandfather, Frederick II, Holy Roman Emperor.

== Life ==
Frederick was the son of Albert the Degenerate and was born at Wartburg in 1257. According to legend, his mother, Margaret of Sicily, who fled Wartburg from her husband in 1270, was overcome with grief at their parting and bit him on the cheek. As a result, he became known as 'the Bitten' or 'the Cheek-Bitten'. While still a child, he was invited by the Lombard Ghibellines, as a grandson of Emperor Frederick II, to assume the Hohenstaufen inheritance in Italy, following various prophecies that foretold the coming of a third Emperor Frederick. From 1280 onward, he held the title of Count Palatine of Saxony.

Because his father preferred their half-brother Apitz, Frederick and his brother Diezmann waged war upon him. Frederick was captured in 1281, but after a long war his father recognized the rights of the brothers in 1289. After the death of their cousin Frederick Tuta (1291), both brothers took possession of his lands and Frederick received the Margraviate of Meissen, leaving to their father only the Margraviate of Landsberg. However, King Adolf of Nassau-Weilburg thought that Meissen and the Eastern March should return to the crown after Tuta's death, and bought Thuringia from the debt-laden Albert. The brothers were again called to arms in the defense of their inheritance, but had to give up the land. Frederick stayed away from home until the death of Adolf returned his land to him. By now his father had also been reconciled with him. Soon afterwards, however, King Albert I claimed Thuringia and was supported by the cities, which longed to become independent (reichsunmittelbar). The landgrave's family was besieged on the Wartburg by the Eisenach forces; however, Frederick succeeded in liberating them. But only the victory at Lucka on 31 May 1307 gave the two brothers relief, and before the king could gather new forces, he died.

After Diezmann's death (1307) the vassals rendered homage to Frederick only, because Albert had renounced rule for an annuity. Only the cities were still opposed to Frederick. But Erfurt was subjected by force, and he was also reconciled with Emperor Henry VII, to whom Frederick had originally refused to submit. In 1310, the Emperor granted him his lands as fiefs.

However, the fight with Brandenburg still continued and when Frederick was captured by Margrave Waldemar, he had to buy his freedom with 32,000 marks of silver and the cession of Lower Lusatia in the Treaty of Tangermünde of 1312. The feuds were renewed in 1316, but ended in 1317 with the Magdeburg Peace. Through the extinction of the Ascanian house, Frederick regained all lost lands except for Landsberg and Lower Lusatia. Now he was able to install a general Landfrieden (peace).

Paralyzed by a stroke since 1321, Frederick died on 16 November 1323 at Eisenach. His bones were later moved to Grimmenstein Castle in Gotha and after its demolition were buried in Friedenstein Castle; however, his tomb was erected in Reinhardsbrunn. In 1285, he married Agnes, the daughter of Count Meinhard II of Gorizia-Tyrol and Elisabeth of Bavaria, widowed mother of Conradin, and after her death he married Elizabeth of Arnshaugk, the daughter of his stepmother, in 1303. Only two children survived him, Elizabeth, who was married to Henry II, Landgrave of Hesse, in 1322, and Frederick, his successor.

== Family ==
Frederick married firstly Agnes of Gorizia–Tyrol (d. 14 May 1293) in 1286, daughter of Meinhard, Duke of Carinthia, and Elisabeth of Bavaria. They had one son:

- Frederick the Lame (9 May 1293 – 13 January 1315, Zwenkau), married Anna (d. 22 November 1327, Wismar), daughter of Albert II, Duke of Saxe-Wittenberg and Agnes of Habsburg (daughter of Rudolph I of Germany).

Frederick married secondly Elizabeth of Lobdeburg-Arnshaugk (1286 – 22 August 1359, Gotha) on 24 August 1300. They had two children:

- Elizabeth (1306–1368), married Henry II, Landgrave of Hesse in 1322
- Frederick II, Margrave of Meissen

== Ancestry ==
Ancestors of Frederick I of Meissen

8. Theodoric I, Margrave of Meissen
4. Henry III, Margrave of Meissen
9. Jutta of Thuringia
2. Albert II, Margrave of Meissen
10. Leopold VI, Duke of Austria
5. Constantia of Austria
11. Theodora Angelina
1. Frederick I, Margrave of Meissen
12. Henry VI, Holy Roman Emperor
6. Frederick II, Holy Roman Emperor
13. Constance of Sicily
3. Margaret of Sicily
14. John of England
7. Isabella of England
15. Isabella of Angoulême

Frederick I of Meissen House of Wettin Born: 1257 Died: 16 November 1323
Preceded by Albert II	Margrave of Meissen; 1292–1323	Succeeded by Frederick II
Preceded by Diezmann	Landgrave of Thuringia; 1298–1323	Succeeded by Frederick II
