= Margaret of Sicily =

Princess of Sicily

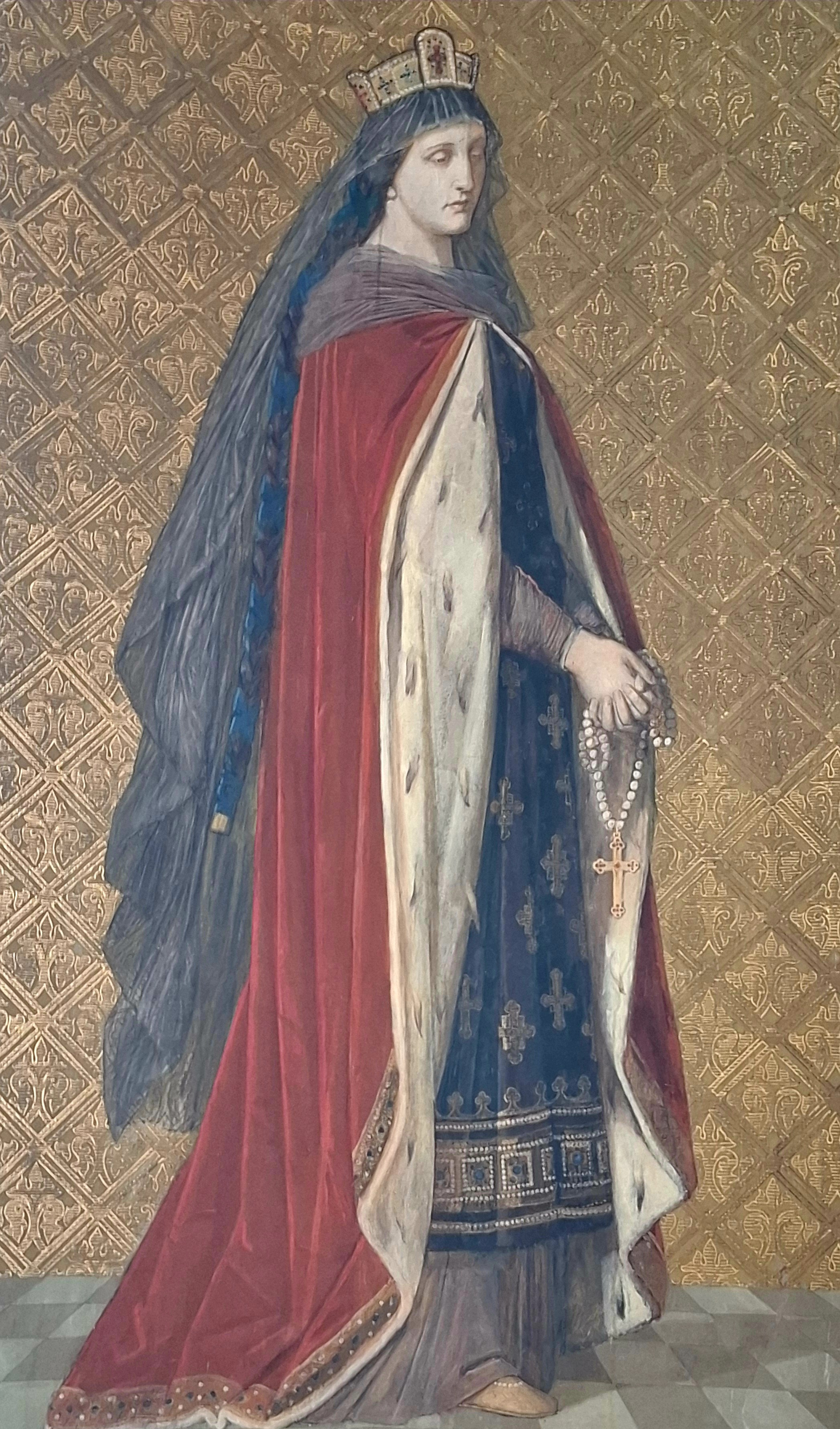
- Margaret of Hohenstaufen. Wall painting by Anton Dietrich (1833–1904) in Albrechtsburg, Meissen.
- Born: 1 December 1241; Foggia, Kingdom of Sicily
- Died: 8 August 1270 (aged 28); Frankfurt-am-Main, Holy Roman Empire
- Spouse: Albert II, Margrave of Meissen
- Issue: Henry; Frederick; Theodoric; Margaret; Agnes of Meissen
- House: Hohenstaufen
- Father: Frederick II, Holy Roman Emperor
- Mother: Isabella of England

Margaret of Sicily, also called Margaret of Hohenstaufen or Margaret of Germany (Italian: Margherita di Sicilia; German: Margaretha von Staufen; 1 December 1241 – 8 August 1270) was a Sicilian and German princess from the House of Hohenstaufen. By marriage, she became Landgravine of Thuringia and Countess Palatine of Saxony (Landgräfin von Thüringen und Pfalzgräfin von Sachsen).

She was born in Foggia, the daughter of Frederick II, Holy Roman Emperor, King of Sicily and Germany, and his third wife, Isabella of England. Her paternal grandparents were Henry VI, Holy Roman Emperor and Constance of Sicily. Her maternal grandparents were John of England and Isabella of Angoulême.

== Birth ==
Margaret was the daughter of Frederick II, Holy Roman Emperor, King of Sicily and Germany, by his third wife, Isabella of England. The date of her birth is difficult to ascertain because there is controversy over the exact number of children borne by her mother. Some sources say that she was the first or second child, born by the end of 1237; others say that she was the last child, born in December 1241, when Isabella died in childbirth. Historians commonly accept the latter date.

== Life ==
Shortly after her birth (1242), Margaret was betrothed to Albert "the Degenerate", eldest son and heir of Henry III "the Illustrious", Margrave of Meissen. The marriage took place in June 1255, the bride receiving Pleissnerland (the towns of Altenburg, Zwickau, Chemnitz and Leisnig) as her dowry.

The couple settled at his residence in Eckartsberga and later moved to Wartburg, where she bore five children: three sons (Henry, Frederick and Dietzmann) and two daughters (Margaret and Agnes). Through her second son Frederick – later Margrave of Meissen – Margaret was the direct ancestor of the Electors and Kings of Saxony and English Queen consorts Margaret of Anjou and Anne of Cleves.

In 1265 her husband received the titles of Landgrave of Thuringia and Count Palatine of Saxony (Pfalzgräf von Sachsen) after the abdication of his father, who retained control of Meissen.

After the execution of her nephew Conradin (29 October 1268), Margaret, as the next legitimate relative, became the rightful Queen of Sicily and the general heiress of the Hohenstaufen claims over the Duchy of Swabia and the Kingdom of Jerusalem (despite the fact she was not descended from the Kings of Jerusalem, her father Frederick II had claimed the kingdom for himself). Her son, Frederick, assumed for some time these titles in her right.

After discovering the adultery of her husband with Kunigunde of Eisenberg, Margaret left Wartburg; according to a legend, before her departure she bit her son Frederick in the cheek; he was called henceforth Frederick the Bitten (de: Friedrich der Gebissene). The flight took place on 24 June 1270. Margaret went to Frankfurt-am-Main and was supported there by the citizens. She died there six weeks later.

== Issue ==
Margaret and Albert had five children:

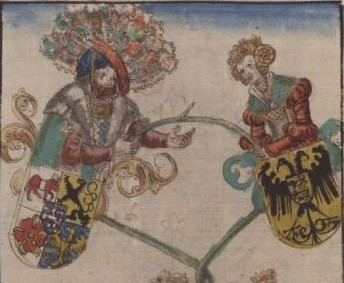
Albert and Margaret

1. Henry (1256–1282), inherited the Pleissnerland in 1274; he died between 25 January and 23 July 1282.
2. Frederick (1257–1323), Margrave of Meissen; died at Wartburg Castle on 16 November 1323.
3. Theodoric (1260–1307), called Dietzmann, Margrave of Lusatia; murdered at Leipzig on 10 December 1307.
4. Margaret (1262–after 1273), died young.
5. Agnes of Meissen (1264–1332); married by 21 July 1282 to Henry I, Duke of Brunswick-Grubenhagen.

== Sources ==
- Arnold, Benjamin (1989). "England and Germany, 1050-1350". In Jones, Michael; Vale, Malcolm (eds.). England and her Neighbours, 1066-1453: Essays in Honour of Pierre Chaplais. The Hambledon Press. pp. 43–52. ISBN 1-852850-14-0.
- Davis, R. H. C. (1988). A History of Medieval Europe. Longman. ISBN 0-582-01404-2.
