= Frederick Tuta =

German aristocrat (died 1291)

- Margrave of Meissen and Landsberg
- Born: c. 1269
- Died: 16 August 1291; Hirschstein Castle
- Buried: Weißenfels
- Noble family: House of Wettin
- Spouse: Catherine of Bavaria
- Issue: Elisabeth
- Father: Theodoric of Landsberg
- Mother: Helen of Brandenburg

Frederick Tuta (c. 1269 – 16 August 1291), a member of the House of Wettin, was Margrave of Landsberg from 1285 and Margrave of Lusatia from 1288 until his death. He also served as regent of the Margraviate of Meissen.

The origin and meaning of his nickname Tuta are unclear and were not recorded. It possibly means "the Stammerer".

== Life ==
Frederick was the only son of the Wettin margrave Theodoric of Landsberg and Helene, a daughter of Margrave John I of Brandenburg; he thereby was a grandson of Margrave Henry III of Meissen. Upon his father's early death in 1285, he succeeded him in the Margraviate of Landsberg, then comprising the bulk of the Osterland territory with Leipzig, Grimma, and the margravial residence of Weißenfels.

When his grandfather Margrave Henry III died in 1288, Frederick Tuta entered into an inheritance conflict with his uncle Albert the Degenerate around the Margraviates of Meissen and Lusatia. While Albert succeeded his father as Margrave of Meissen, Frederick inherited the Lusatian march. However, Albert's sons Frederick the Bitten and Theodoric IV disputed this arrangement and Frederick's rule in Lusatia within short time was contested by his cousin Theodoric IV.

In turn, Frederick Tuta concentrated on expanding his power into the Meissen lands where Margrave Albert's rule was shaken by a fierce dispute with his sons. Temporarily arrested by Frederick the Bitten, Albert had to renounce large parts of his estates and in 1289 Frederick Tuta, with the support of several local nobles, was able to purchase a significant Meissen territory. He also acquired several estates around Dresden from his uncle Frederick Clem, the youngest son of late Margrave Henry III.

However, Frederick's sudden death put an end to his ambitions, when he died on 16 August 1291, aged 22, at Hirschstein Castle – allegedly due to eating poisoned cherries offered to him by Bishop Withego of Meissen. As he did not have a male heir, his possessions were divided after his death. His cousins Frederick the Bitten and Theodoric IV took Meissen and Lusatia; while the Margraviate of Landsberg was sold to the Ascanian margraves of Brandenburg.

== Marriage and issue ==
Frederick married Catherine (d. 1310), a daughter of the Wittelsbach duke Henry XIII of Bavaria. They had one daughter, Elisabeth.

== Ancestors ==
Ancestors of Frederick Tuta

16. Otto II, Margrave of Meissen
8. Theodoric I, Margrave of Meissen
17. Hedwig of Brandenburg
4. Henry III, Margrave of Meissen
18. Hermann I, Landgrave of Thuringia
9. Jutta of Thuringia
19. Sophia of Sommerschenburg
2. Theodoric of Landsberg
20. Leopold V, Duke of Austria
10. Leopold VI, Duke of Austria
21. Helena of Hungary
5. Constance of Babenberg
11. Theodora Angelina
1. Frederick Tuta
24. Otto I, Margrave of Brandenburg
12. Albert II, Margrave of Brandenburg
25. Ada of Holland
6. John I, Margrave of Brandenburg
26. Conrad II, Margrave of Lusatia
13. Matilda of Groitzsch
27. Elisabeth of Poland
3. Helen of Brandenburg
28. Valdemar I of Denmark
14. Valdemar II of Denmark
29. Sophia of Minsk
7. Sophia of Denmark
30. Sancho I of Portugal
15. Berengaria of Portugal
31. Dulce of Aragon

Frederick Tuta House of Wettin Born: 1269 Died: 16 August 1291
Preceded by Theodoric	Margrave of Landsberg; 1285-1291	Succeeded by Otto IV as Margrave of Brandenburg
Preceded by Henry III as Margrave of Meissen	Margrave of Lusatia; 1288-1291	Succeeded by Theodoric IV
