= Kunigunde of Eisenberg =

- Born: c. 1245
- Died: bef. 31 May 1286
- Buried: St. Catherine monastery in Eisenach
- Spouse: Albert II, Margrave of Meissen
- Father: Otto of Eisenberg

Kunigunde of Eisenberg (also known as Kunne; c. 1245 – before 31 May 1286), was a noblewoman from the Holy Roman Empire and the second wife of Landgrave Albert II of Thuringia.

She was a daughter of Count Otto of Eisenberg and his wife Anna of Kottwotz.

== Life ==
Kunigunde was a lady-in-waiting of Albert's first wife, Margaret of Sicily. Beautiful and ambitious, she attracted the attention of the Landgrave and became his mistress, bearing him two illegitimate children:

- Elisabeth (1269 – c. 23 April 1326), married before 11 April 1291 to Henry II of Frankenstein (d. 23 April 1326).
- Albert, nicknamed Apitz, (1270 – between 1301 and 1305), Lord of Tenneberg from 1290, buried in the St. Catherine monastery in Eisenach.

With her lover's knowledge, is said that Kunigunde attempted the murder of Landgravine Margaret so that she could usurp her position and honours. After some poison attempts, Kunigunde finally managed to so frighten her mistress, that Margaret fled the court the night of 24 June 1270, fearing for her life. According to legend, she bit her son Frederick I in the cheek before she left; this explains his nickname "Frederick the Bitten" (German: Friedrich der Gebissene). She died six weeks later in Frankfurt am Main.

Kunigunde's marriage with Albert took place soon afterwards (1272), despite the fact that she was of lower rank. During the ceremony, she concealed her son Apitz under her robe, as this was supposed to procure for natural children, the privileges of legitimacy. However this marriage brought baneful consequences for Thuringia. Estranged from his legitimate sons, the Landgrave disinherited them and proclaimed Kunigunde's son to be his heir. The Thuringian nobility resisted this, which led to a long succession of military hostilities between father and sons. The affair was only able to be settled peaceably when Kunigunde died (before 31 May 1286), aged about forty. She was buried in the St. Catherine monastery in Eisenach.

Was only after her death that Albert divided his territories amongst his legitimate sons.
