= Pleissnerland =

Pleissnerland, Pleissenland or the Imperial Territory of Pleissenland (German: Reichsterritorium Pleißenland; Latin: Terra Plisensis) was a Reichsgut of the Holy Roman Empire, which meant that it was directly possessed by the respective elected King of the Romans or Emperor. It was named for the Pleiße River, and was located in what is now the border region between the German states of Thuringia and Saxony south of Leipzig, including the towns of Altenburg, Chemnitz, Zwickau and Leisnig.

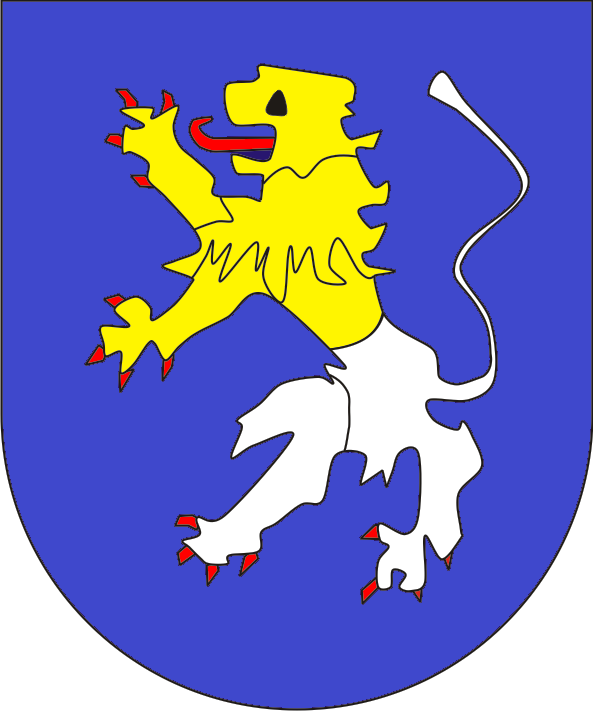
county of Pleissen

== History ==
The area east of the Sorbian March was conquered between 927 and 929 by King Henry I of Germany in the course of his campaign against the Polabian Slavs, it was incorporated as Gau Plisni into the Saxon Marca Geronis. Upon the weakening of the Imperial authority during the 11th century Investiture Controversy, the estates gradually came under the rule of local comital dynasties, foremost the Burgraves of Nuremberg and the Margraves of Meissen.

Emperor Lothair III (1133-1137) began to reassert his claims by repeatedly choosing the Kaiserpfalz at Altenburg (Castro Plysn) as his temporary residence and by promoting the colonization the surrounding estates up to the Ore Mountains in the course of the Ostsiedlung, including the foundation of the Benedictine abbey of Chemnitz. He also seized parts of the homelands of the Lusatian Margrave Henry of Groitzsch, who had died without heirs in 1135. The Reichsgut gained in importance with the accession of King Conrad III of Germany from the House of Hohenstaufen in 1138: As Conrad's elder brother Duke Frederick II of Swabia held the Swabian home territories of the Hohenstaufen dynasty, the King had to rely on the Pleissnerland around the Altenburg Kaiserpfalz as a personal allodium in his quarrels with the mighty Bavarian duke Henry the Proud and his successors from the House of Welf.

King Conrad had already implemented the office of a permanent burgrave at Altenburg in 1147. Similar to the adjacent Egerland in the southwest, the imperial territory Terra Plisensis administered by ministeriales in Altenburg, Leisnig, at Colditz Castle and Lausick was a creation of his nephew Emperor Frederick Barbarossa, who also established the Imperial city of Chemnitz about 1170. Unlike his uncle, Frederick Barbarossa had inherited the Swabian Hohenstaufen estates from his father Duke Frederick II, he nevertheless had to secure his rule in the Saxon territories upon the fierce conflict with the Welf Duke Henry the Lion and his unsuccessful campaigns against the Italian Lombard League. The Hohenstaufen managed to retain the overlordship of the Pleissnerland; Frederick's son King Henry VI in 1195 even seized the neighbouring Margraviate of Meissen, which nevertheless fell back to the Saxon House of Wettin upon his death two years later.

With the 1198 election of both Henry's younger brother Philip of Swabia and the Welf Otto IV of Brunswick, the quarrels between both houses were resumed. To secure the Pleissnerland possessions, Philip acted tactically in order to gain allies, confirming the enfeoffment of the Wettin margrave Dietrich the Oppressed with Meissen. Even after his assassination in 1208, his rival Otto, Emperor from 1209 to 1218, did not achieve any position of authority over the Reichsgut. In 1211/12 Philip's nephew Frederick II of Hohenstaufen, elected King of the Romans, returned from Italy and began to take possession of the Pleissnerland estates, completed by the establishment of a Teutonic Knights commandry at Altenburg. As Frederick II concentrated on the reorganisation of the Kingdom of Sicily, the actual power was exercised by his son King Henry (VII) of Germany. The Imperial authority was decisively enfeebled, when Henry rebelled against his father and was deposed in 1235.

In 1243 Emperor Frederick II, deeply entangled in his conflict with Pope Innocent IV, finally had to grant the Pleissnerland as a dowry of his daughter Margaret, whom he betrothed to Albert II, son of Margrave Henry III of Meissen from the House of Wettin. Though the estates were only given as a pledge, the Wettins had no intentions to restore them and confirmed their tenure upon the marriage of the couple in 1255, unopposed after the Hohenstaufen dynasty became extinct with the execution of Frederick's grandson Conradin in 1268. Last attempts by Rudolph of Habsburg to regain the former Reichsgut were rejected, and the Pleissnerland was incorporated into the possessions of the Meissen margraves, from 1423 Electors of Saxony.
