= March of Lusatia =

March of the Holy Roman Empire (965–1367)

Margraviate of Lusatia Markgrafschaft Lausitz (German)
- 965–1367
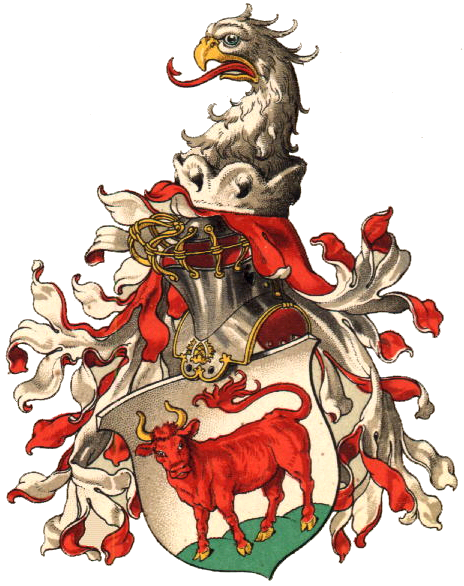
- Coat of arms

- March of Lusatia around 1000
- Status: State of the Holy Roman Empire, Crown land of the Saxon Eastern March (965–1303); Crown land of the Margraviate of Brandenburg (1303-1367); Crown land of the Bohemian Crown (1367–1635)
- Capital: Lübben
- Government: Margraviate
- Margraves
  - 965–993: Odo I (first)
  - 1365–1367: Otto of Wittelsbach (last)
- Historical era: Middle Ages
  - Partitioned from Marca Geronis: 965
  - Conquered by Poland: 1002–1031
  - Appointment of Dietrich II of Wettin: 1032
  - Death of Henry IV: 1288
  - Sold to Brandenburg: 1303
  - To Bohemia: 1367
  - To Saxon electorate: 1635
Preceded by	Succeeded by
Marca Geronis	Lower Lusatia; Upper Lusatia
- Today part of: Germany; Poland

The March or Margraviate of Lusatia (German: Markgrafschaft Lausitz) was an eastern border march of the Holy Roman Empire in the lands settled by Polabian Slavs. It arose in 965 in the course of the partition of the vast Marca Geronis. Ruled by several Saxon margravial dynasties, among them the House of Wettin, the lordship was contested by the Polish kings as well as by the Ascanian margraves of Brandenburg. The remaining territory was finally incorporated into the Lands of the Bohemian Crown in 1367.

== Geography ==
The territory of the margraviate roughly corresponded with the present-day region of Lower Lusatia. It originally stretched from the border of the Saxon stem duchy along the Saale River in the west to the border with Poland on the Bóbr River in the east. From about 1138, the adjacent territory beyond the river was part of the Duchy of Silesia (Lower Silesia), a provincial duchy of Poland. In the 13th century, the eastern border shifted westward to the Lusatian Neisse or beyond as Poland retook the eastern outskirts of the march with the towns of Gubin and Lubsko, which were included within the Duchy of Silesia. In the north, the March of Lusatia bordered on the Northern March, which was following the Great Slav Rising of 983 established as the Margraviate of Brandenburg under the Ascanian margrave Albert the Bear in 1157, as well as on Lubusz Land, nucleus of the Brandenburg Neumark territory after annexation from Poland in 1248. In the south, the Margraviate of Meissen likewise arose from the former Marca Geronis, its western part merged with the later Electorate of Saxony, while the eastern Milceni lands emerged as Upper Lusatia.

Over the centuries, the margravial territory diminished in favour of the Ascanian County of Anhalt and the Duchy of Saxe-Wittenberg. Further territories in the west were split off by means of distribution, like the Osterland ruled by the Margraves of Landsberg or the County of Brehna.

== History ==
The area east of the former limes Sorabicus of East Francia, settled by the Slavic Veleti and Milcenian tribes, was gradually conquered until 963 by the Saxon count Gero of Merseburg. He added the territory between the Saale and Bober rivers to his Marca Geronis, which the Saxon duke and German King Otto I had established in 937. After Gero's death in 965 and the loss of the Northern March in the course of the 983 Slavic uprising, Lusatia became the heartland of the remaining Saxon Eastern March (Ostmark) under Margrave Odo I.

=== Margraviate ===
While the term Ostmark stayed in use for centuries, the Lusatian March appeared as a separate administrative unit from at least as early as 965 with the concurrent establishments of the Marches of Meissen, Merseburg and Zeitz. The division between Lower Lusatia and the adjacent Milceni lands around Bautzen and Görlitz (later Upper Lusatia), then part of Meissen, was also apparent even that early.

In 1002, the Marches of Lusatia and Meissen were conquered by Polish ruler Boleslaus the Brave during King Henry II's campaign against revolting Henry of Schweinfurt. This sparked a German–Polish War, which ended by the 1018 Peace of Bautzen. Henry's successor Conrad II waged two campaigns, in 1031 and 1032, which reconquered both Lower and Upper Lusatia from Mieszko II of Poland.

By the reign of King Henry IV from 1056, Lusatia had been reincorporated into the Holy Roman Empire and it formed one of the four divisions of Upper Saxony along with Meissen, the Ostmark, and Zeitz. These regions were not always ruled by separate margraves, but were mainly administrative divisions. Lusatia and the Ostmark were ruled together and eventually the Ostmark was reduced to little more than Lower Lusatia. Under Henry IV, Upper Lusatia was detached from the Lusatian march and granted as a fief to Bolesław II of Poland.

=== Imperial state ===
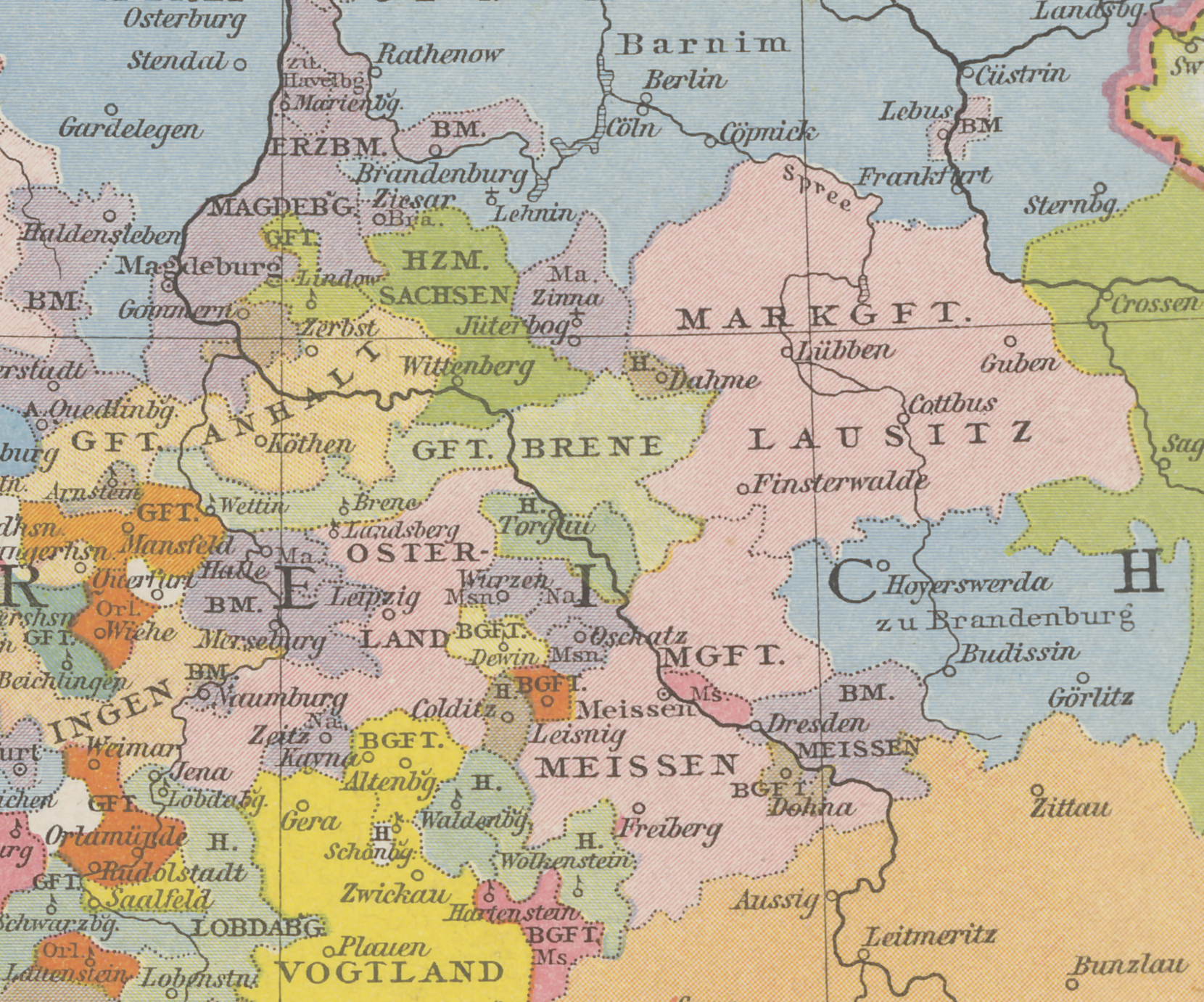
Wettin marches of Lusatia and Meissen (pink), about 1260

The first "Margrave of Lusatia" is only known from 1046. Under Emperor Lothair III, Upper and Lower Lusatia were once again reunited in 1136. The terms "Ostmark" and "Lusatia" were interchangeable into the 12th century, though in 1128 Count Henry of Groitzsch is recorded as Margrave of the Ostmark, but as not receiving the Lusatian march until 1131. While in 1156 Emperor Frederick Barbarossa invested Duke Vladislaus II of Bohemia with Upper Lusatia, the territory of the Margraviate of (Lower) Lusatia was further reduced by the establishment of the Margraviate of Landsberg (Osterland), the Principality of Anhalt and the Duchy of Saxe-Wittenberg.

By 1211, the eastern outskirts of the march with the towns of Gubin and Lubsko were recaptured by Polish ruler Henry the Bearded and included within the Duchy of Silesia. From 1210 on the remaining March of Lower Lusatia was held by the Meissen margraves from the Saxon House of Wettin. Upon the death of Margrave Henry III of Meissen in 1288, his lands were divided: while the Meissen territory passed to his eldest son Albert II, the Lusatian lands fell to his grandson Frederick Tuta, son of the late Margrave Theodoric of Landsberg. A fierce inheritance quarrel arose, whereupon Albert's son Theodoric IV (Diezmann) campaigned Lusatia and took it in possession after Frederick Tuta's death (presumably poisoned) in 1291.

In 1303 Theodoric IV sold the Lusatian march to the Ascanian margrave Otto IV of Brandenburg. The Brandenburg Ascanians had already acquired neighbouring the adjacent "Upper Lusatian" estates around Bautzen and Görlitz, as well as the Margraviate of Landsberg in 1291; nevertheless, when the dynasty became extinct in 1319, the territorial complex again disintegrated. The Lower Lusatian lands were seized by the Wittelsbach king Louis the Bavarian and with Brandenburg ceded to his son Louis V. His brother Otto finally sold Lower Lusatia to the Luxembourg emperor Charles IV in 1367 whereafter it was incorporated into the Lands of the Bohemian Crown. Centuries later, both crown lands of Lower and Upper Lusatia passed to the Wettin Electors of Saxony by the 1635 Peace of Prague.

== Margraves of (Lower) Lusatia or (Saxon) Ostmark ==
- Dedi I, 1046–1075
- Dedi II, fl. 1069
- Henry I, 1075–1103
- Henry II, 1103–1123
- Wiprecht, 1123–1124
- Albert the Bear, 1123–1128
- Henry III of Groitzsch, 1124–1135
- Conrad of Wettin, 1136–1156, also Margrave of Meissen since 1123
- Dietrich I, 1156–1185, son of Conrad, titular Margrave of Landsberg
- Dedi III, 1185–1190, brother
- Conrad II, 1190–1210, son

=== Margraves of Meissen ===
- Dietrich II the Oppressed, 1210–1221, also Margrave of Meissen since 1198
- Henry IV the Illustrious, 1221–1288, last Wettin margrave of Lusatia

=== Margraves of Landsberg ===
- Frederick Tuta, 1288–1291, grandson of Henry IV
- Dietrich IV, 1291–1303, grandson of Henry IV

The Margraviate of Lusatia (Ostmark) was purchased by the Ascanian margraves of Brandenburg in 1303

=== Margraves of Brandenburg ===
- Otto I, 1303–1308
- Waldemar, 1308–1319, line extinct, Lusatia seized by Emperor Louis IV
- Louis I, 1323–1351
- Louis II, 1351–1365
- Otto II, 1365–1367

Lusatia became a Bohemian crown land in 1367.

== Sources ==
- Barański, Marek Kazimierz. Dynastia Piastów w Polsce. Warszawa; Wydawnictwo Naukowe PWN, 2005.
- Reuter, Timothy. Germany in the Early Middle Ages 800–1056. New York: Longman, 1991.
- Thompson, James Westfall. Feudal Germany, Volume II. New York: Frederick Ungar Publishing Co., 1928.
