= Theodoric of Landsberg =

Theodoric
- Margrave of Landsberg
- Reign: 1265–1285
- Born: 1242
- Died: 8 February 1285
- Buried: Seußlitz Castle
- Noble family: House of Wettin
- Spouse: Helen of Brandenburg
- Issue: Sophie of Landsberg; Frederick Tuta; Gertrude; Helen; Brigitta
- Father: Henry III, Margrave of Meissen
- Mother: Constance of Babenberg

Theodoric of Landsberg (German: Dietrich, nicknamed the Wise or the Fat; 1242 – 8 February 1285), a member of the House of Wettin was Margrave of Landsberg from 1265 until his death.

== Life ==
Theodoric was the second son of Henry the Illustrious, margrave of Meissen and Lusatia, and his wife Constance of Babenberg, a daughter of Duke Leopold VI of Austria. In 1261, his father split the Margraviate of Landsberg off from his Lusatian territory, which after the War of the Thuringian Succession in 1265 he transferred to Theodoric, thereby creating a cadet branch of the Wettin dynasty.

The territory comprised the westernmost part of Lusatia between the Saale and Mulde rivers, centered around Landsberg Castle. Theoderic's march included the towns of Delitzsch, Leipzig and Groitzsch, his estates stretched down to Zwickau and Grimma with the residence at Weißenfels. The creation of an Imperial State without consent by the Holy Roman Emperor was against legal provisions, nevertheless it had no penalty effects as a central Imperial authority did not exist during the years of the interregnum. Moreover, the division entailed fierce inheritance conflicts with Theoderic's elder brother Albert the Degenerate and his sons.

Upon the election of Rudolf of Habsburg as King of the Romans in 1273, Theoderic initially sided with his rival King Ottokar II of Bohemia, but later chose to remain neutral. He vested the Leipzig citizens with significant town privileges and also joined a Prussian Crusade of the Teutonic Knights.

Theodoric died in 1285 on the way back from Silesia, where he had betrothed his daughter Gertrude to the Piast duke Bolko I the Strict. His tomb is located in the former abbey of Seußlitz, today part of Nünchritz, Saxony. The Landsberg branch already became extinct when his son Frederick Tuta died without male heirs in 1291. Landsberg was then sold to the Ascanian margraves of Brandenburg.

== Marriage and issue ==
In 1258, Theodoric married Helen of Brandenburg (d. 1304), a daughter of Margrave John I of Brandenburg. They had five children:

- Sophie of Landsberg (born: c. 1259; died: 24 August 1318), married to Conradin of Hohenstaufen in 1266 (proxy marriage), secondly married to Konrad I of Głogów in 1271, later Abbess of the Saint Clare monastery in Weißenfels
- Frederick Tuta, Margrave of Meissen and Landsberg (born 1269; died: 16 August 1291)
- Gertrude, became a nun in Weißenfels (died: 17 January 1325)
- Helen, became a nun in Weißenfels
- Brigitta

Theodoric of Landsberg House of Wettin Born: 1242 Died: 8 February 1285
Preceded by Henry the Illustrious as Margrave of Lusatia	Margrave of Landsberg; 1265-1285	Succeeded by Frederick Tuta
