= Isabella of England =

Holy Roman Empress from 1235 to 1241

Holy Roman Empress Queen consort of Germany and Sicily
- Tenure: 15 July 1235 – 1 December 1241
- Born: 1214; Gloucester, Kingdom of England
- Died: 1 December 1241 (aged 26–27); Foggia, Kingdom of Sicily
- Burial: Andria Cathedral, Italy
- Spouse: Frederick II, Holy Roman Emperor (m. 1235)
- Issue More details: Margaret, Landgravine of Thuringia
- House: Plantagenet
- Father: John, King of England
- Mother: Isabella of Angoulême

Isabella of England (1214 – 1 December 1241) was an English princess of the House of Plantagenet. She became Holy Roman Empress, Queen of Sicily, Italy and Germany from 1235 until her death as the third wife of Emperor Frederick II.

== Life ==
=== Birth and early years ===
Isabella was born around 1214 as the fourth child and second daughter of John, King of England, and his second wife Isabella of Angoulême. Her exact date of birth is unknown, and the year is calculated based on the fact that Matthew Paris reported that the princess got married at the age of 21. By the time Isabella was born, her parents' marriage had already started to unravel, and the princess spent most of the time with her mother. After the death of King John in 1216, Isabella remained in the full care of her mother and was with her until 1220, when Isabella of Angoulême remarried and left the English court.

The princess was raised from an early age by the "nurse and governess" Margaret Biset, who received for her services from 1219, by order of her brother King Henry III, one penny a day "from the hands of the Viscount Hereford"; she remained within Isabella's household and accompanied her to Germany sixteen years later, when the princess married. The services of the rest of the princess's servants (cook, stableman and others) were also paid by her brother, and by his order, when some of Isabella's servants retired from her service, they were assigned a generous pension..

The first years of Isabella's life were spent in Gloucester Castle. Later, when the problems that accompanied the early years of her brother's reign ended, she was transported to the court, at first located at Woodstock Palace in Oxfordshire and later at Westminster. From time to time, the princess with her family visited other royal residences: Winchester, Marlborough, Northampton, York and others.

=== Youth ===
In June 1220 or 1221, Isabella's older sister, Joan, was betrothed to King Alexander II of Scotland, and according to the marriage contract, if Joan (who was in France with her mother) did not have time to return to England by Michaelmas (29 September), (Note: Joan had previously been betrothed to Hugh X of Lusignan, whom her mother would eventually marry, and was in France.) within two weeks after that, the Scottish King was to marry Isabella. Twice over the next ten years, King Henry III tried to marry off his sister Isabella (Note: Both sisters of the princess were already married: Joan to the Scottish King, and Eleanor to William Marshal, 2nd Earl of Pembroke.): first, in 1225, there were negotiations for a marriage with Henry VII, King of the Romans (who ten years later became Isabella's stepson), (Note: The negotiations ended very quickly due to the fact that the father of the intended groom, Emperor Frederick II, spoke out against the marriage.) and then for a marriage with Louis IX of France.

As Isabella got older, the more she loved privacy. In November 1229, with the permission of her brother, she departed for Marlborough Castle, which became her residence. At the time, reconstruction was being completed in the castle, and King Henry III ordered the constable of the castle to allow his sister to choose any quarters she wanted.

The relationship between brother and sister was very warm, and the King visited Isabella several times: he visited Marlborough during the celebration of the wedding of "the maiden Catherine" who served Isabella and also visited his sister in 1231 and 1232 at Gloucester Castle. On 13 November 1232, King Henry III sent his personal tailor to his sister to make her a new full wardrobe. The King also celebrated Christmas with Isabella that year; he sent her three of the best dishes from his table and presented many gifts, and then for several months he sent her the items needed to equip her own chapel. Provisions for Isabella and her guests were provided by "two or three worthy men" from Gloucester, while wine and venison were regularly sent to his sister by the King, who also provided one of his fish suppliers for use by Isabella. The royal chaplain, Warin, who served Isabella, was granted to his sister by the King. In the summer of 1232, Isabella returned to Marlborough Castle.

=== Marriage ===
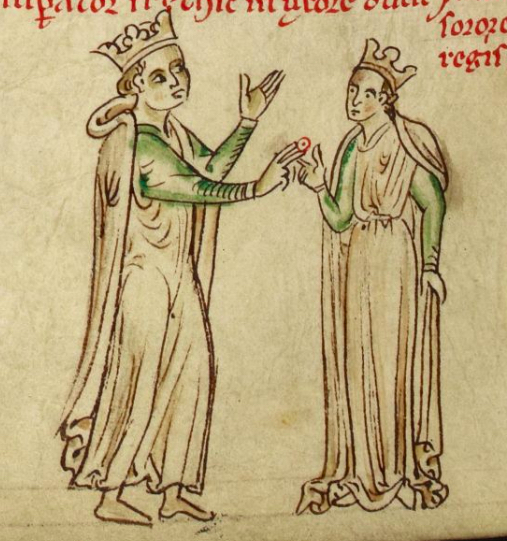
The wedding of Isabella and Emperor Frederick II.

In 1234, Isabella left seclusion and settled in the Tower of London. In November, the twice-widowed Holy Roman Emperor Frederick II, at a friendly meeting at Rieti, received the advice of Pope Gregory IX to ask Isabella's hand, and in February 1235, he sent an embassy to King Henry III headed by his chancellor Pietro della Vigna. The marriage of Isabella and Emperor Frederick II was designed to strengthen the political alliance of England and the Holy Roman Empire against France. After three days of discussion, King Henry III agreed to the marriage; Isabella was brought from her quarters in the Tower to the Palace of Westminster, where she met with the ambassadors, who "declared her the most worthy of the imperial brides", put a wedding ring on her finger and greeted her as their Empress.

On 22 February 1235, an agreement was signed, according to which King Henry III provided his sister with a dowry of 30,000 marks (an amount sought by the Emperor in order to fund his wars in northern Italy), which was to be paid within two years, and as a wedding gift, he gave her all the necessary utensils, jewelry, horses and rich clothes, all made according to the latest German fashion. Also, the princess received patent letters from the Emperor, giving Isabella, as Queen of Sicily and Holy Roman Empress, the possession of the lands due to her.

On 27 February, both parties signed the marriage contract. The marriage of the English princess with the Holy Roman Emperor was greeted with enthusiasm by both King Henry III and by the common people, although the latter were greatly disappointed by the enormous "help" required of them on this occasion: the King had to levy an unpopular tax of two marks of silver per hide in order to afford Isabella's dowry.

In early May 1235, Archbishop Heinrich I of Cologne and Duke Henry I of Brabant arrived in England to fetch the bride to her new homeland; Isabella departed from London on 7 May under the care and tutelage of the Bishop of Exeter, William Briwere. The princess's brothers accompanied her from Canterbury to Sandwich, from where Isabella sailed on 11 May. Four days later, they landed at Antwerp.

Before Isabella's departure from England, the Emperor's ambassadors swore to King Henry III that if the Emperor died before marriage to the princess could be completed, she would return home without hindrance and in complete safety. It was rumored that on the way, the Emperor's enemies, allied with the French king, tried to kidnap Isabella, but the escort provided by Emperor Frederick II was able to protect the princess. On 22 or 24 May, Isabella arrived in Cologne and stayed at the house of provost of St. Gereon, where the princess had to spend six weeks while the Emperor was at war with his own son.

=== Empress ===
After this wait, Emperor Frederick II summoned his bride to Worms, where their official wedding took place and Isabella was crowned at Worms Cathedral by Archbishop Siegfried III of Mainz. Researchers disagree on the date of this double event. Alison Weir and Mary Anne Everett Green date it 20 July 1235. On the other hand, Kate Norgate, author of the article on Isabella in the Dictionary of National Biography, writes about Sunday 15 July, while James Panton lists both dates as possible. Wedding celebrations lasted for four days, and they were attended by "four kings, eleven dukes, counts and margraves, thirty or fewer prelates and minor nobles".

On 14 August, Emperor Frederick II called an assembly to which representatives from all over the Empire were invited; they met the new empress and brought her their congratulations. Isabella (or Elizabeth, as some of her husband's subjects called her) seems to have been a very dignified and beautiful woman. Frederick was delighted with his new wife, but immediately after the wedding he got rid of Isabella's English entourage "of both sexes", leaving only her nurse Margaret Biset and one maid with her, and transferred her to seclusion in Hagenau, where the couple spent most of the winter. Earlier, the English embassy, which arrived with Isabella, left for their homeland; they brought gifts to their king from the emperor, among whom were three living leopards —animals depicted on the coat of arms of the English king.

Soon after the wedding, Emperor Frederick II was forced to leave and consign his wife to the care of his son Conrad. In early 1236, Isabella and her husband visited Ravenna; part of the year the imperial couple spent in Italy, after which they returned to Germany. Already being married, Isabella continued to maintain a relationship with her brother King Henry III, including keeping up their correspondence, in which they communicated as warmly as strict etiquette allowed. Cordial correspondence with the English king was conducted by the Emperor as well, but the name of his wife was mentioned in the letters only occasionally and strictly with regard to political issues. In July, Emperor Frederick II was preparing for a military campaign and was forced to leave his wife in Germany for almost a year.

By Michael's Day, Emperor Frederick II returned to Lombardy, where he summoned his wife and where he spent the winter with her. In September 1238, the emperor sent his wife to Andria, where Isabella remained until December, when the archbishop of Palermo escorted her back to Lombardy. In early 1239, Isabella spent some time in Noventa Padovana while her husband was in Padua; in February 1240, she returned to southern Italy, where the emperor soon arrived.

Emperor Frederick II, it seems, respected and loved his wife, but in a quite strange manner, taking care of her safety and surrounding her with luxury and splendor, but keeping her at a distance from himself and the company of his "harem", which included women from Arabia. In addition, James Panton writes that the empress was forbidden to communicate with all men, except for the black eunuchs around her. Isabella's brother King Henry III complained that his sister was never allowed to "wear her crown" publicly or appear as empress at public meetings. In 1241, when her second brother, Richard of Cornwall, went to visit Frederick on his way back from the Holy Land, only "after a few days" was he able "with the permission of the emperor and of his own free will" to visit his sister's chambers. Frederick did not allow Isabella to meet her brother at court.

Isabella died in childbirth at Foggia near Naples in 1241. Alison Weir dates Isabella's death between 1–6 December, while Kate Norgate and Mary Anne Everett Green believe that she died on 1 December. Frederick II at the time of his wife's death was in Faenza, and Isabella's dying words were a request to her husband to continue to maintain friendly relations with her brother King Henry III. Isabella was buried with full honors at Andria Cathedral near Bari beside Frederick's previous wife, Queen Isabella II of Jerusalem.

King Henry III was deeply saddened and shocked by his sister's death. He ordered his almoner to distribute, "for the soul of the empress, our late sister," over £200 in alms at Oxford and Ospringe, and the same amount was distributed in London and Windsor. Matthew Paris lamented the death of Isabella, calling her "the glory and hope of England".

== Issue ==
Sources are at variance concerning Isabella's issue, including the number of children she had, their names, and their birth order:

- Kate Norgate names three children: Margaret (February 1237 – 1270), Henry (18 February 1238 - 1254) and a child who died in childbirth in December 1241. Later researchers mentioned as the first child of Isabella a son called Jordanus (b. 1236), (Note: Thomas Curtis Van Cleve's The Emperor Frederick II of Hohenstaufen: Immutator Mundi (Oxford, 1972). Page 381:"Certainly there is some evidence that a son, Jordanus, was born in the year 1236, and died shortly afterwards, but the only son of Frederick II and Isabella of England whose birth can be firmly established was a second Henry, born in 1238, and named after his uncle, Henry III, the King of England." Ref supplied by Peter Stewart via soc.gen.med 20 Jan 2008.) but Norgate believes that contemporary sources of Isabella do not confirm this; moreover, the Emperor announced the birth of Margaret to his Italian subjects, from which it follows that she was the first child of the couple. Norgate writes that Henry, after the death of his father, became the titular king of Jerusalem, and Margaret was married to Albert II, Margrave of Meissen, and became one of the ancestors of the House of Saxe-Coburg-Gotha.
- Alison Weir names four children: Jordanus (born and died in 1236), Agnes (born and died in 1237), Henry (titular king of Jerusalem; 1238 - 1253) and Margaret (wife of the Landgrave Albert II of Thuringia; 1241-1270). Weir wrote about Isabella's death in childbirth, but does not report what happened to the child; perhaps this child was Margaret —and this belief is the most commonly accepted among websites and genealogical investigations.
- Mary-Anne Everett Green also names four children: Jordanus (born and died in 1236), Agnes (born and died in 1237), Henry (born 18 February 1238) and Margaret (born 1 December 1241).
- James Panton writes about Isabella's giving birth to four or five children, but does not mention their names.

== Bibliography ==
- Alio, Jacqueline (2018). Queens of Sicily 1061-1266. New York: Trinacria. ISBN 978-1943639144.
- Everett Green, Mary Anne (1850). Henry Colburn (ed.). Lives of the Princesses of England, from the Norman Conquest. Vol. 2. London. pp. 1–47.
- Goldstone, Nancy (2007). Four Queens: The Provençal Sisters who ruled Europe. New York: Viking Penguin. ISBN 9780670038435.
- Norgate, Kate (1892). "Isabella (1214-1241)" . In Lee, Sidney (ed.). Dictionary of National Biography. Vol. 29. London: Smith, Elder & Co. pp. 62–63.
- Panton, James (2011). Historical Dictionary of the British Monarchy. Scarecrow Press. pp. 263–264. ISBN 978-0810874978.
- Tuchman, Barbara W. (1978), A Distant Mirror: the Calamitous 14th Century., Alfred A. Knopf, New York, 1984. ISBN 0-394-40026-7.
- Weir, Alison (2011). Britain's Royal Family: The Complete Genealogy. Random House. ISBN 978-1446449110.

Isabella of England House of Plantagenet Born: 1214 Died: 1 December 1241
German royalty
Vacant Title last held by Margaret of Austria	Queen consort of Germany; 1235–1241	Vacant Title next held by Elisabeth of Bavaria
Vacant Title last held by Isabella II of Jerusalem	Queen consort of Sicily; 1235–1241	Vacant Title next held by Elisabeth of Bavaria
Vacant Title last held by Isabella II of Jerusalem	Holy Roman Empress; 1235–1241	Vacant Title next held by Margaret II of Hainault
