= Osterland =

Historical area in Germany

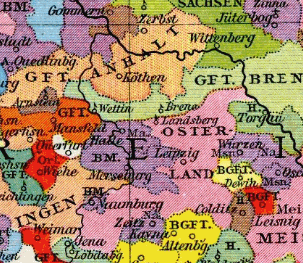
Map of Osterland in the 13th century.

Osterland (terra orientalis) is a historical region in Germany. It was situated between the Elbe and Saale rivers to the north of Pleissnerland which it later absorbed and it included the city of Leipzig. The name derives from the previous name of the territory, Ostmark, meaning "eastern march."

Today, the area belongs to the German states of Thuringia and Saxony.

== See also ==
- List of regions of Saxony
