= Imperial vicar =

Imperial Office in the Holy Roman Empire

Coat of arms of Augustus III of Poland as vicar of the Holy Roman Empire

An imperial vicar (German: Reichsvikar) was a prince charged with administering all or part of the Holy Roman Empire on behalf of the emperor. Later, an imperial vicar was invariably one of two princes charged by the Golden Bull with administering the Holy Roman Empire during an interregnum.

== Overview ==
The Holy Roman Empire was an elective monarchy, not a hereditary one. When an emperor died, if a king of the Romans had not already been elected, there would be no new emperor for a matter of several months until all the electors, or their representatives, could assemble for a new imperial election. During that time, imperial institutions still required oversight. This was performed by two imperial vicars. Each vicar, in the words of the Golden Bull, was "the administrator of the empire itself, with the power of passing judgments, of presenting to ecclesiastical benefices, of collecting returns and revenues and investing with fiefs, of receiving oaths of fealty for and in the name of the holy empire". All acts of the vicars were subject to ratification by the elected king or emperor. On many occasions, however, there was no interregnum, as a new king had been elected during the lifetime of his predecessor.

The vicariate came to be associated with two counts palatinate: the duke and elector of Saxony (who also held the position of count palatine of Saxony) was vicar in areas operating under Saxon law (Saxony, Westphalia, Hanover, and northern Germany); the count palatine of the Rhine, also an elector, was vicar in the remainder of the Empire (Franconia, Swabia, the Rhine, and southern Germany). The Golden Bull of 1356 confirmed the position of the two electors.

Disputes over the Palatine electorate from 1648 to 1777 led to confusion about who the rightful vicar was. In 1623, the Palatine Electorate was transferred to the duke (and thenceforth elector) of Bavaria. However, in 1648 a new electorate was created for the restored Count Palatine of the Rhine, which led to disputes between the two as to which was vicar. In 1657, both purported to act as vicar, but the Saxon vicar recognised the elector of Bavaria. In 1711, while the elector of Bavaria was under the ban of the Empire, the elector palatine again acted as vicar, but his cousin was restored to his position upon his restoration three years later. In 1724, the two electors made a pact to act as joint vicars, but the Imperial Diet rejected the agreement. Finally, in 1745, the two agreed to alternate as vicar, with Bavaria starting first. This arrangement was upheld by the Imperial Diet at Regensburg in 1752. In 1777 the question became moot when the elector palatine inherited Bavaria.

In 1806, Emperor Francis II abdicated the imperial throne and also declared the dissolution of the Holy Roman Empire itself in the wake of defeats by France and the defection of much of southern and western Germany from the Empire to join the new Confederation of the Rhine. His decision to declare the dissolution of the Empire as well as to abdicate was apparently partially designed to forestall an interregnum with rule by the imperial vicars, which he feared might result in the election of Napoleon as emperor.

== List of imperial vicars, 1437–1792 ==
Interregnum began	Interregnum ended	Duration	Duke of Saxony	Count Palatine of the Rhine/ Duke of Bavaria
9 December 1437 death of Sigismund	18 March 1438 election of Albert II	3 months, 9 days	Frederick II, Elector of Saxony	Louis IV, Elector Palatine
27 October 1439 death of Albert II	2 February 1440 election of Frederick III	3 months, 6 days	Frederick II, Elector of Saxony	Louis IV, Elector Palatine
12 January 1519 death of Maximilian I	17 June 1519 election of Charles V	5 months, 5 days	Frederick III, Elector of Saxony	Louis V, Elector Palatine
20 January 1612 death of Rudolph II	13 June 1612 election of Matthias	4 months, 24 days	John George I, Elector of Saxony	Frederick V, Elector Palatine
20 March 1619 death of Matthias	28 August 1619 election of Ferdinand II	5 months, 8 days	John George I, Elector of Saxony	Frederick V, Elector Palatine
2 April 1657 death of Ferdinand III	18 July 1658 election of Leopold I	15 months, 16 days	John George II, Elector of Saxony	Ferdinand Maria, Elector of Bavaria
17 April 1711 death of Joseph I	12 October 1711 election of Charles VI	5 months, 25 days	Frederick Augustus I, Elector of Saxony (Augustus II the Strong)	John William, Elector Palatine
20 October 1740 death of Charles VI	14 January 1742 election of Charles VII	14 months, 25 days	Frederick Augustus II, Elector of Saxony (Augustus III of Poland)	Charles Albert, Elector of Bavaria
20 January 1745 death of Charles VII	13 September 1745 election of Francis I	7 months, 24 days	Frederick Augustus II, Elector of Saxony (Augustus III of Poland)	Maximilian III, Elector of Bavaria
20 February 1790 death of Joseph II	30 September 1790 election of Leopold II	7 months, 10 days	Frederick Augustus III, Elector of Saxony	Charles Theodore, Elector of Bavaria
1 March 1792 death of Leopold II	5 July 1792 election of Francis II	4 months, 4 days	Frederick Augustus III, Elector of Saxony	Charles Theodore, Elector of Bavaria

== Imperial vicar for particular provinces ==
In the Empire's early centuries, imperial vicars were appointed from time to time to administer one of the Empire's constituent kingdoms of Germany, Italy or Burgundy (Arles). This was in fact a different office.

In Italy, the position of "imperial vicar" was conferred to several princes throughout history. This has to be distinguished from the general vicarship over Imperial Italy as a whole. The title was conferred to the Count of Savoy by Emperor Frederick II in 1226. In the second half of the 14th century, Charles IV, Holy Roman Emperor made permanent Frederick's decision and associated it to the title of Duke of Savoy. In 1556, given that France occupied the Savoyard states in 1535–1536, Emperor Charles V intended to transfer the position to Philip II of Spain with his abdication but Philip's requests to receive the title were denied by Charles's successor Ferdinand I, Holy Roman Emperor. Duke Emmanuel Philibert of Savoy used the Imperial vicarship in order to recover the dynastic possessions of his family in 1557-1559. Furthermore, he and his successors exercised the title to assert a formal primacy among Italian imperial princes (although this was also claimed by the ruler of Tuscany who held the unique title of Grand Duke) and to present themselves as champions of Italian liberties up to the 1800s. In 1624 the office of the general commissioner respectively plenipotentiary was created for Imperial Italy, which factually took over the original tasks of the imperial vicariate, which had only been a titular vicariate since Charles IV.

Imperial vicars were also appointed for the Kingdom of Burgundy (Arles), but in time the office was reduced to the title of honor. In 1378, it was awarded to the young French prince Charles (future king Charles VI), but only for his lifetime. In 1421, Emperor Sigismund appointed a prominent nobleman Louis II of Chalon-Arlay as the imperial vicar of Burgundy, in hope to restore some imperial authority over the region, including Dauphiny, Viennois and Provence. Those efforts were directed against rising ambitions of powerful Burgundian duke Philip the Good, who also held several domains within the Holy Roman Empire. In 1463, the title of Imperial vicar of Burgundy was offered to duke Philip himself, by the emperor Friedrich III, as part of a proposed dynastic alliance between the houses of Valois-Burgundy and Habsburgs, but no final agreement was reached.

In the absence of an emperor, the right to appoint vicars for provinces was exercised by the Pope. This is not to be confused with the ecclesiastical office of vicar.

== Sources ==
- Vaughan, Robert (2002) [1970]. Philip the Good: The Apogee of Burgundy (2nd ed.). Woodbridge: The Boydell Press.
- Wilson, Peter (2016). Heart of Europe: A History of the Holy Roman Empire. Cambridge: Harvard University Press.
