= Wartburg =

Castle in Eisenach, Germany

Wartburg Castle
- Wartburg
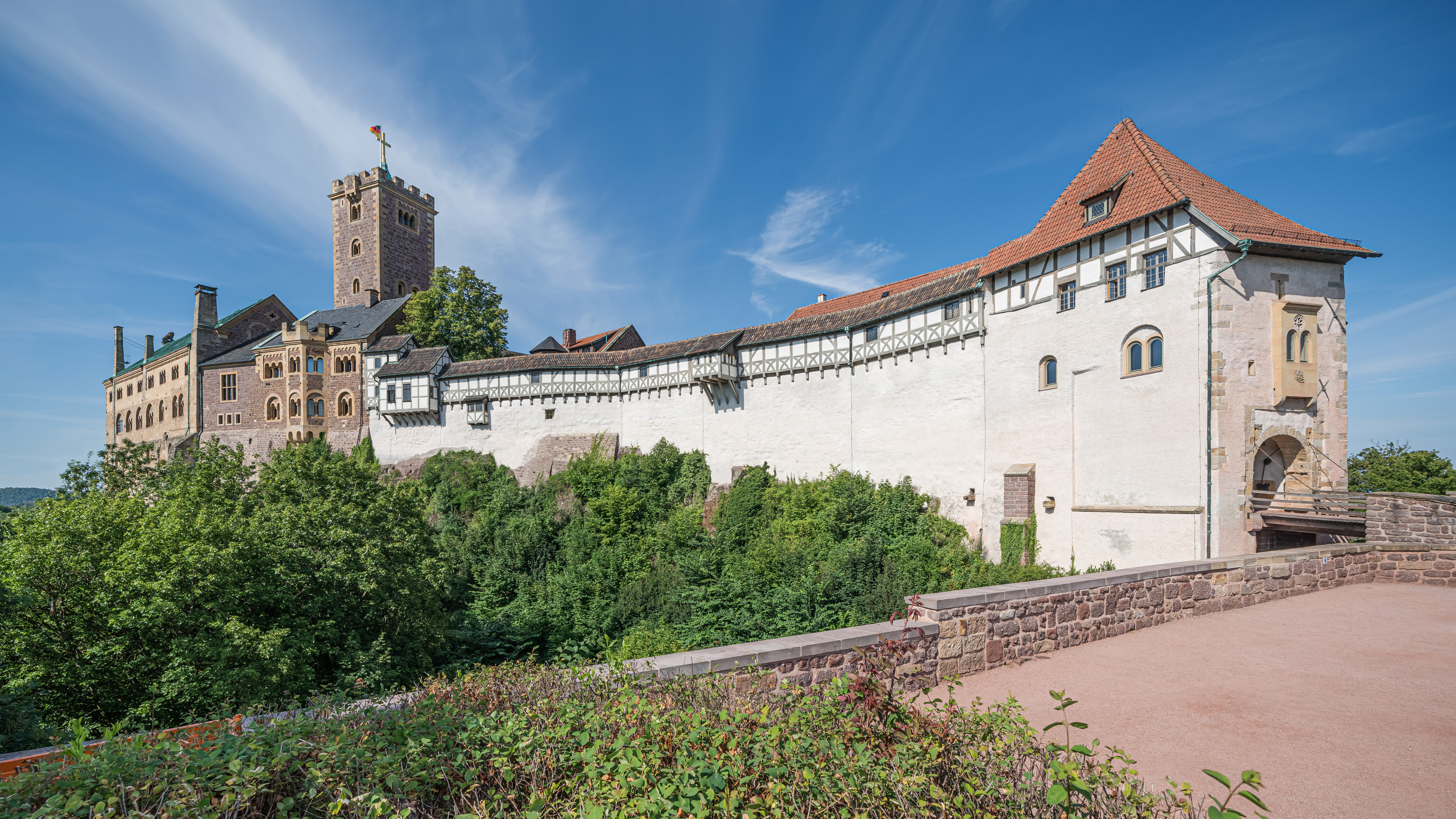
- Wartburg in Eisenach

- Location within Thuringia Location within Germany
- Former names: Wartberg

General information
- Type: Castle
- Location: Eisenach, Germany
- Coordinates: 50°57′58″N 10°18′23″E
- Construction started: c. 1067
- Renovated: 19th and 20th centuries
- Landlord: Wartburg Stiftung

UNESCO World Heritage Site
- Criteria: Cultural: iii, vi
- Reference: 897
- Inscription: 1999 (23rd Session)

The Wartburg (German pronunciation: [ˈvaʁtbʊʁk]) is a castle originally built in the Middle Ages. At an elevation of 410 metres (1,350 ft) in the state of Thuringia, Germany, it is situated on a southwest-facing precipice and overlooks the town of Eisenach to the north. It was the home of St. Elisabeth of Hungary, the place where Martin Luther translated the New Testament of the Bible into German, the site of the Wartburg festival of 1817 and the supposed setting for the possibly legendary Sängerkrieg. It was an important inspiration for Ludwig II when he decided to build Neuschwanstein Castle.

Wartburg is the most visited tourist attraction in Thuringia after Weimar. Although the castle today still contains substantial original structures from the 12th through 15th centuries, much of the interior dates back only to the 19th century. In 1999, Wartburg Castle was inscribed on the UNESCO World Heritage List because of its quintessential medieval architecture and its historical and religious significance.

== Etymology ==
The name of the castle is probably derived from German: Warte, a watchtower, in spite of a tradition which holds that the castle's founder, on first laying eyes on the site, exclaimed, "Warte, Berg—du sollst mir eine Burg tragen!" ("Wait, mountain—you shall bear my castle!"). It is a German play on words for mountain (Berg) and fortress (Burg), coupled with a further play on warte (wait) and Warte ("watchtower").

== Location ==
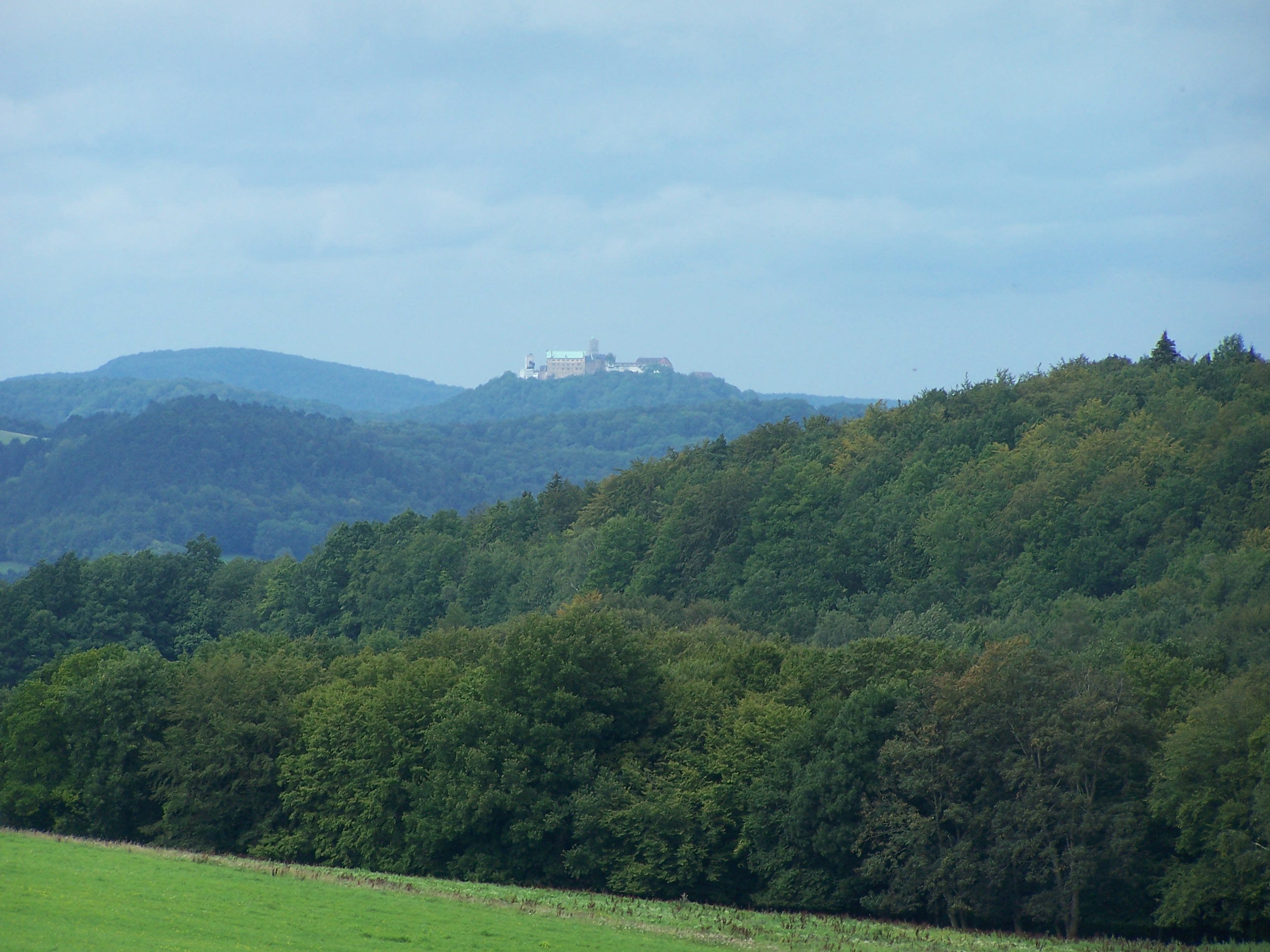
View of Wartburg from the east

Wartburg is located on a 410-metre (1,350 ft) precipice to the southwest of, and overlooking the town of Eisenach, in the state of Thuringia, Germany. The hill is an extension of Thuringian Forest, overlooking Mariental to the south-east and the valley of the Hörsel to the north, through which passed the historical Via Regia. The Rennsteig passes not far to the south of the castle.

== History ==
The castle's foundation was laid about 1067 by the Thuringian count of Schauenburg, Louis the Springer ( Ludwig der Springer ), a relative of the Counts of Rieneck in Franconia. Together with its larger sister castle Neuenburg in the present-day town of Freyburg, the Wartburg secured the extreme borders of his traditional territories. Louis the Springer is said to have had clay from his lands transported to the top of the hill, which was not quite within his lands, so he might swear that the castle was built on his soil.

The castle was first mentioned in a written document in 1080 by Bruno, Bishop of Merseburg, in his De Bello Saxonico ("The Saxon War") as Wartberg.

During the Investiture Controversy, Louis's henchmen attacked a military contingent of King Henry IV of Germany. The count remained a fierce opponent of the Salian rulers, and upon the extinction of the line, his son Louis I was elevated to the rank of a Landgrave in Thuringia by the new German king Lothair of Supplinburg in 1131.

From 1172 to 1211, the Wartburg was one of the most important princes' courts in the German Reich. Hermann I supported poets like Walther von der Vogelweide and Wolfram von Eschenbach who wrote part of his Parzival here in 1203.

The castle thus became the setting for the legendary Sängerkrieg, or Minstrels' Contest in which such Minnesänger as Walther von der Vogelweide, Wolfram von Eschenbach, Albrecht von Halberstadt (the translator of Ovid) and many others supposedly took part in 1206/1207. The legend of this event was later used by Richard Wagner in his opera Tannhäuser.

At the age of four, St. Elisabeth of Hungary was sent by her mother to the Wartburg to be raised to become consort of Landgrave Ludwig IV of Thuringia. From 1211 to 1228, she lived in the castle and was renowned for her charitable work. In 1221, Elisabeth married Ludwig. In 1227, Ludwig died on the Crusade and she followed her confessor Father Konrad to Marburg. Elisabeth died there in 1231 at the age of 24 and was canonized as a saint of the Roman Catholic Church just five years after her death.

In 1247, Heinrich Raspe, the last landgrave of Thuringia of his line and an anti-king of Germany, died at the Wartburg. He was succeeded by Henry III, Margrave of Meissen.

In 1320, substantial reconstruction work was done after the castle had been damaged in a fire caused by lightning in 1317 or 1318. A chapel was added to the Palas.

The Wartburg remained the seat of the Thuringian landgraves until 1440.

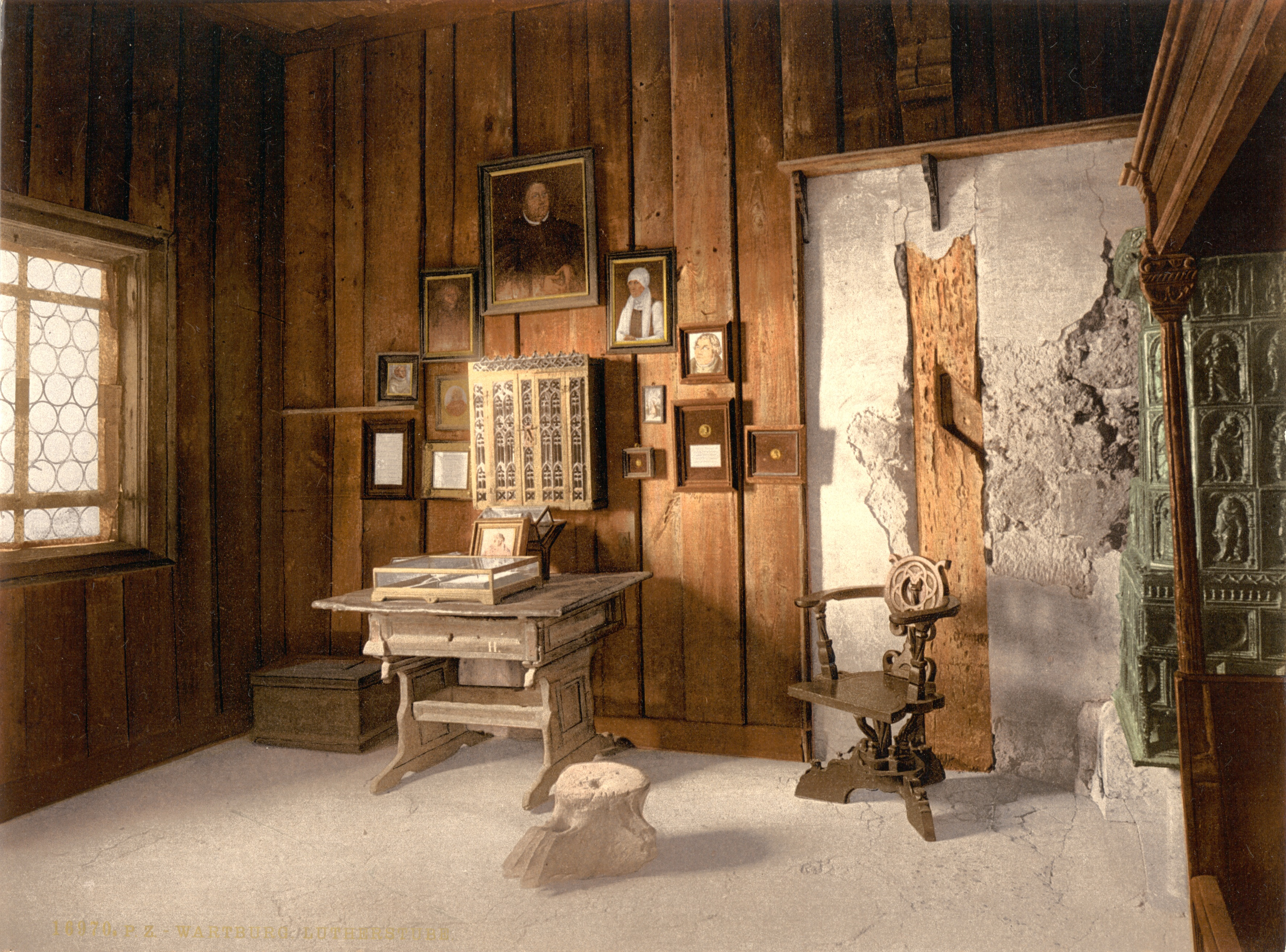
The Luther Room in the Vogtei (bailiwick's house)

From May 1521 to March 1522, Martin Luther stayed at the castle under the name of Junker Jörg (the Knight George), after he had been taken there for his safety at the request of Frederick the Wise following his excommunication by Pope Leo X and his refusal to recant at the Diet of Worms. It was during this period that Luther translated the New Testament from ancient Greek into German in just ten weeks. Luther's was not the first German translation of the Bible but it quickly became the most well known and most widely circulated. The Wartburg was the setting for the famous legend of Luther throwing an inkwell at the Devil, who was trying to distract Luther from his work.

From 1540 until his death in 1548, Fritz Erbe, an Anabaptist farmer from Herda, was held captive in the dungeon of the south tower, because he refused to abjure anabaptism. After his death, he was buried in the Wartburg near the chapel of St. Elisabeth. In 1925, a handwritten signature of Fritz Erbe was found on the prison wall.

Over the next centuries, the castle fell increasingly into disuse and disrepair, especially after the end of the Thirty Years' War when it had served as a refuge for the ruling family of Saxe-Weimar. Nevertheless, at least the palace and the Vogtei (bailiwick's house) never fell into complete ruins, but remained under cover, while others, especially outbuildings and the keep (bergfried), fell into complete disrepair, so that they later had to be replaced.

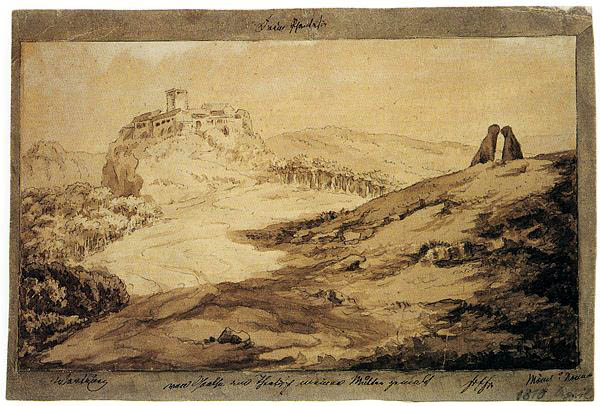
Wartburg, monk and nun, drawing by Johann Wolfgang von Goethe (1807)

In 1777, Johann Wolfgang von Goethe stayed at the Wartburg for five weeks, making various drawings of the buildings.

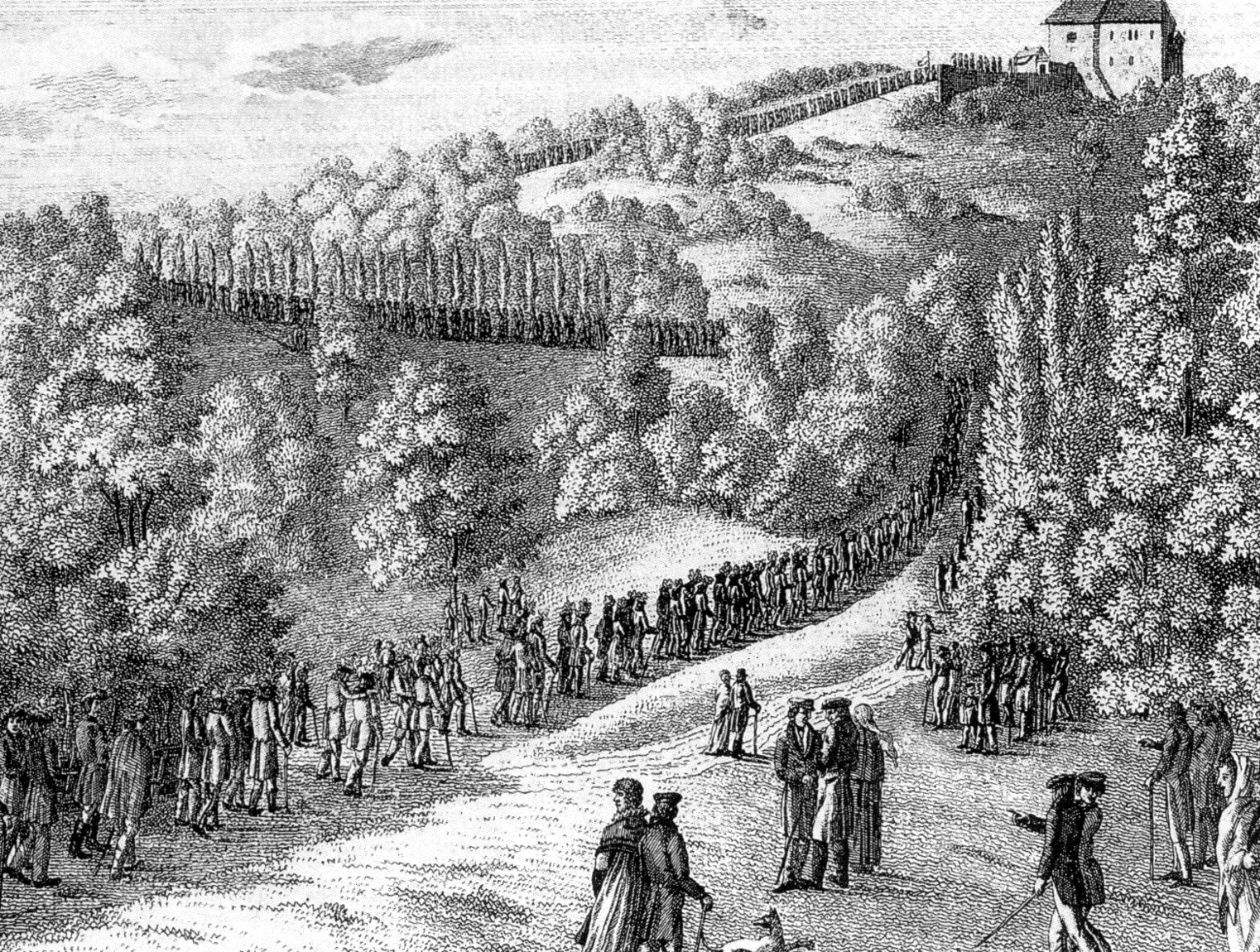
Students marching to the Wartburg in 1817

On 18 October 1817, the first Wartburg festival took place. About 500 students, members of the newly founded German Burschenschaften ("fraternities"), came together at the castle to celebrate the German victory over Napoleon four years before and the 300th anniversary of the Reformation, condemn conservatism and call for German unity under the motto "Honour – Freedom – Fatherland". Speakers at the event included Heinrich Hermann Riemann, a veteran of the Lützow Free Corps, the philosophy student Ludwig Rödiger, and Hans Ferdinand Massmann.

With the permission of the absent chaplain Friedrich Ludwig Jahn, the Code Napoléon and other books were burned 'in effigy': instead of the costly volumes, scraps of parchment with the titles of conservative books (including August von Kotzebue's History of the German Empires) were placed on the bonfire. Karl Ludwig Sand, who would assassinate Kotzebue two years later, was among the participants.

This event and a similar gathering at Wartburg during the Revolutions of 1848 are considered seminal moments in the movement for German unification.

During the rule of the House of Saxe-Weimar-Eisenach, Grand Duke Karl Alexander ordered the reconstruction of Wartburg in 1838. He and his wealthy wife, Princess Sophie of the Netherlands, had the castle extensively rebuilt as a national cultural monument in the Neo-Romanesque style during his long reign. The Grand Duke's bedroom with its phenomenal view can also still be visited. The lead architect was Hugo von Ritgen, for whom it became a life's work. In fact, it was finished only a year after his death in 1889.

Drawing on a suggestion by Goethe that the Wartburg would serve well as a museum, Maria Pavlovna and her son Karl Alexander also founded the art collection (Kunstkammer) that became the nucleus of today's museum.

The reign of the House of Saxe-Weimar-Eisenach ended in the German Revolution in 1918. In 1922, the Wartburg Stiftung (Wartburg Foundation) was established to ensure the castle's maintenance.

After the end of World War II, Soviet occupation forces took the renowned collection of weapons and armour. Its whereabouts still remain unknown. The Rüstkammer (the armoury) of the Wartburg used to contain a notable collection of about 800 pieces, from the splendid armour of King Henry II of France, to the items of Frederick the Wise, Pope Julius II and Bernhard von Weimar. All these objects were taken by the Soviet Occupation Army in 1946 and have disappeared in the Soviet Union. Two helmets, two swords, a prince's and a boy's armour, however, were found in a temporary store at the time and a few pieces were given back by the USSR in the 1960s. The new Russian Government has been petitioned to help locate the missing treasures.

Under communist rule during the time of the GDR extensive reconstruction took place in 1952–54. In particular, much of the palas was restored to its original Romanesque style. A new stairway was erected next to the palas.

In 1967, the castle was the site of celebrations of the GDR's national jubilee, the 900th anniversary of the Wartburg's foundation, the 450th anniversary of the beginning of Luther's Reformation and the 150th anniversary of the Wartburg Festival.

In 1983, it was the central point of the celebrations on account of the 500th birthday of Martin Luther.

== Architecture ==
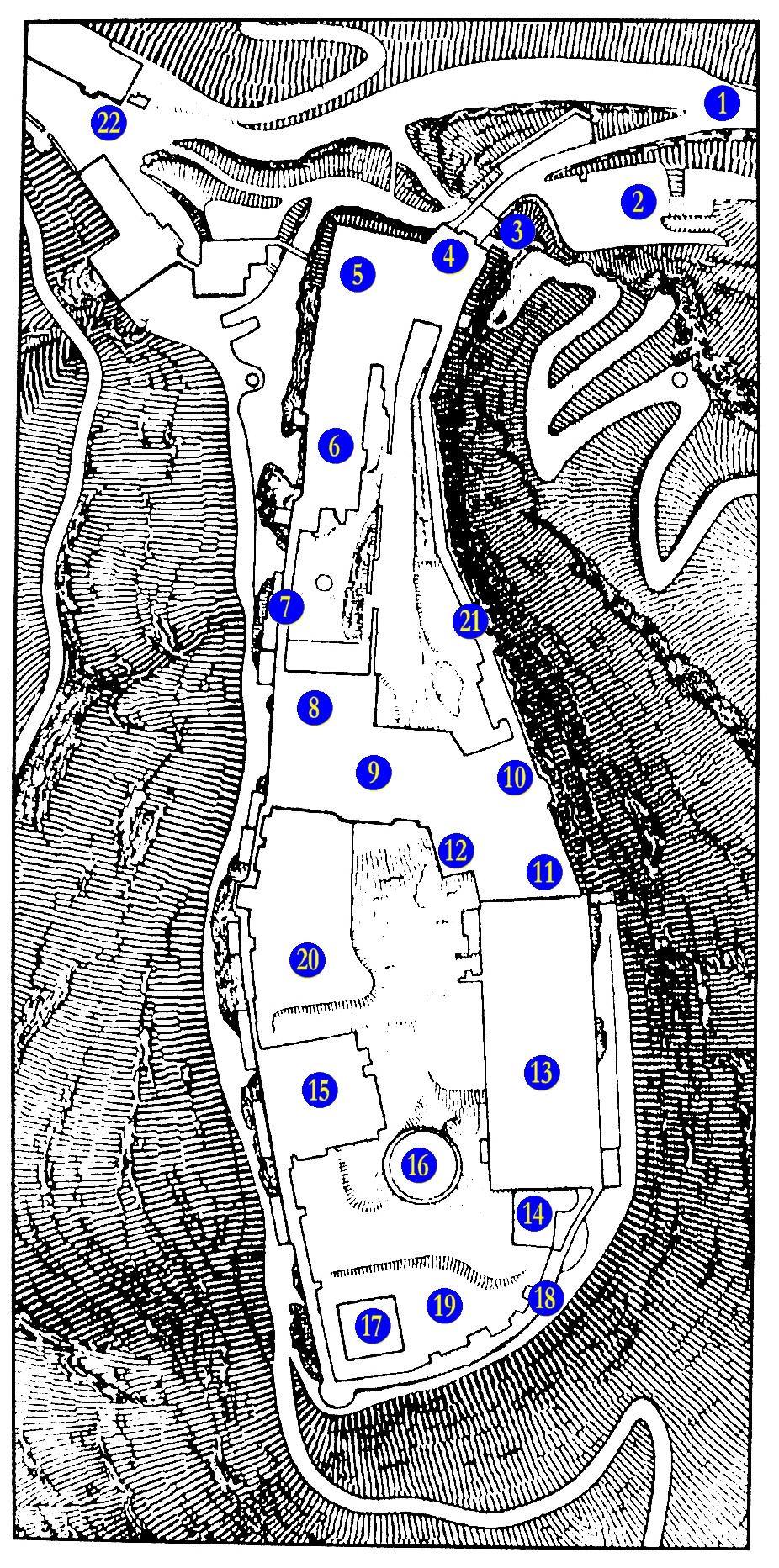
Map of the Wartburg: (1) access ramp, (2) redoubt, (3) drawbridge, (4) Torhaus (barbican), (5) Ritterhaus, (6) Vogtei and first courtyard, (7) Margarethengang, (8) Dirnitzlaube, (9) inner gatehouse, (10) Neue Kemenate, (11) stairs, (12) Bergfried, (13) Palas, (14) Ritterbad,(15) Gadem, (16) second courtyard with cistern (17) Südturm, (18) southern curtain wall, (19) kitchen garden, (20) Commandant's garden, (21) Elisabethengang, (22) Hotel auf der Wartburg

=== Palas ===
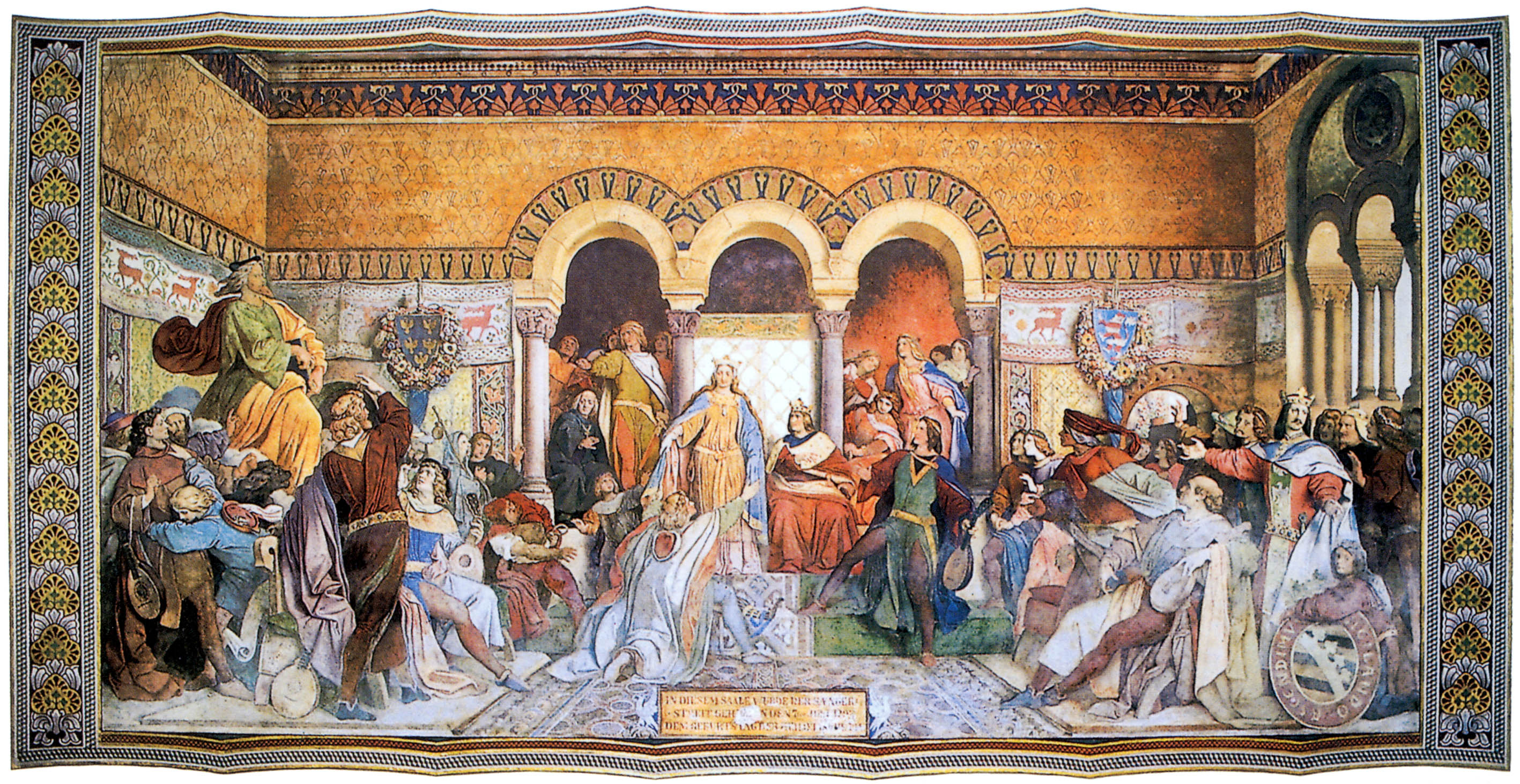
Schwind's Sängerkrieg fresco in the Sängersaal (1854)

The largest structure of the Wartburg is the Palas, originally built in late Romanesque style between 1157 and 1170. It is considered the best-preserved non-ecclesial Romanesque building north of the Alps.

The Palas features rooms like the Rittersaal and the Speisesaal which have been reconstructed as closely as possible to the original Romanesque style and which contain original structures (pillars or roof elements). Some rooms have complete wooden beam ceilings from the time of construction. However, many of the rooms mostly reflect the tastes of the 19th and 20th centuries and the image of the Middle Ages prevalent at the time: the Elisabeth-Kemenate was fitted with mosaics showing the life of St. Elisabeth (created in 1902–06) on behalf of Kaiser Wilhelm II, the Sängersaal (with frescoes of the Sängerkrieg by Moritz von Schwind) and the Festssaal on the top floor. The latter also features frescoes by Schwind (on the triumph of Christianity) and served as the inspiration for the Sängerhalle at Neuschwanstein Castle. The Wartburg's Sängersaal is the setting for Act II of Tannhäuser. None of the wallpaintings, including those in the Landgrafenzimmer or the Elisabethengalerie, are actually medieval in origin, but were created in the 19th century.

=== Other structures ===
The drawbridge and barbican offer the only access to the castle and have been largely unchanged since medieval times.

Vorburg is the area immediately inside the first gate. It dates to the 14th/15th century and is made up of several half-timbered buildings: the Elisabethengang (covered walkway), the Vogtei (Bailiff's lodge), the Margarethengang (covered walkway) and the Ritterhaus (Knights' House).

The Lutherstube in the Vogtei, where Martin Luther stayed when he was in the castle, also features paintings by Lucas Cranach.

The Bergfried (donjon) was completed in 1859 and sits on the foundations of a medieval keep. It is topped by a landmark three-meter-tall cross.

The Neue Kemenate (New Bower, 1853–1860) today exhibits the art treasures of the Wartburgsammlung, including paintings by Lucas Cranach the Elder and sculptures from the workshop of Tilman Riemenschneider.

The Romanesque Südturm or South Tower was built in 1318. Together with the Palas it is the oldest part of the castle. A dungeon is located below.

In 1999, UNESCO added Wartburg Castle to the World Heritage List as an "Outstanding Monument of the Feudal Period in Central Europe", citing its "Cultural Values of Universal Significance".

For a while, the status of Wartburg as a World Heritage site was endangered by plans to build very tall wind turbines on Milmesberg near Marksuhl. However, in November 2013, the investor agreed not to build the turbines and a regional planning update has banned such structures within sight of Wartburg in the future.

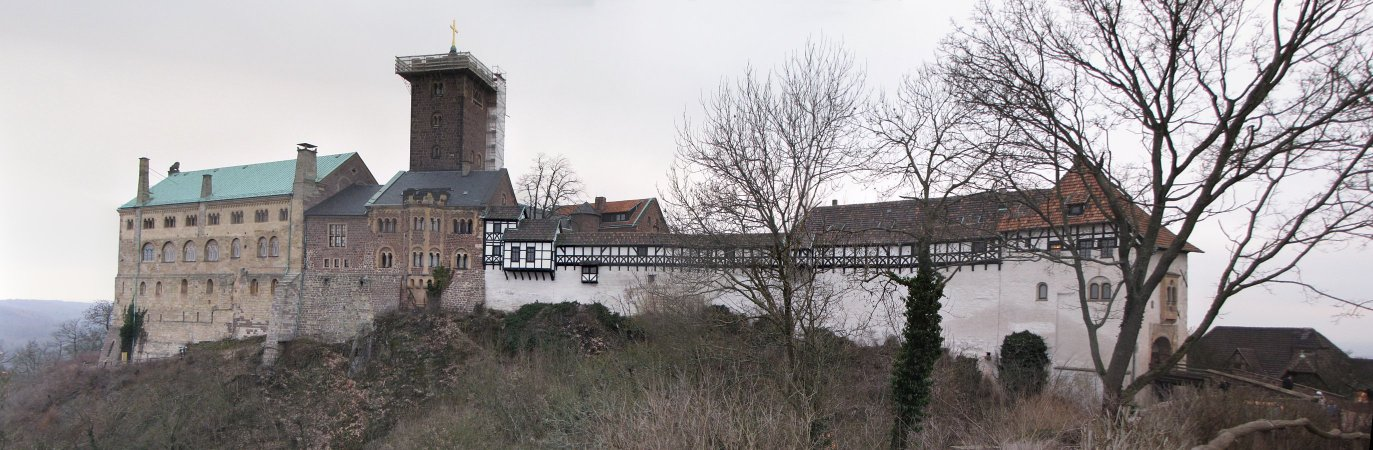
Panorama view from the redoubt to the east

== Today ==
Wartburg is a popular place of Christian pilgrimage (particularly for those of the Evangelical-Lutheran tradition) and tourist destination, the most-visited site in Thuringia after Weimar. It is accessible to visitors and guided tours offer access to the interior of the buildings. In addition, there is a museum in the castle. Children can ride donkeys up the hill. The Festsaal is used regularly for staging the opera Tannhäuser, as well as concerts and other events. There is also a hotel, located right next to the castle, originally built during the castle's reconstruction in the 19th century.

Bill Clinton, the 42nd president of the United States, visited the Wartburg castle, as well as the Bach House, on 14 May 1998 during his state visit to Germany.

== Legacy ==
For centuries, the Wartburg has been a place of pilgrimage for many people from within and outside Germany, for its significance in German history and in the development of Christianity. Several places (especially US towns founded by Lutherans) and a local brand of automobile have been named after the Wartburg. Wartburg College in Iowa, United States, is named in commemoration of Martin Luther's receiving refuge at the castle and because of the college's forest location and its Thuringian heritage. Wartburg Theological Seminary, also located in Iowa was named in commemoration of Wartburg Castle. The main complex at Wisconsin Lutheran Seminary resembles the Wartburg.

The Wartburgkreis is named after the castle, although Wartburg is located outside the district. Eisenach, originally part of the district, became kreisfrei ("district-free") in 1998.

== Image gallery ==
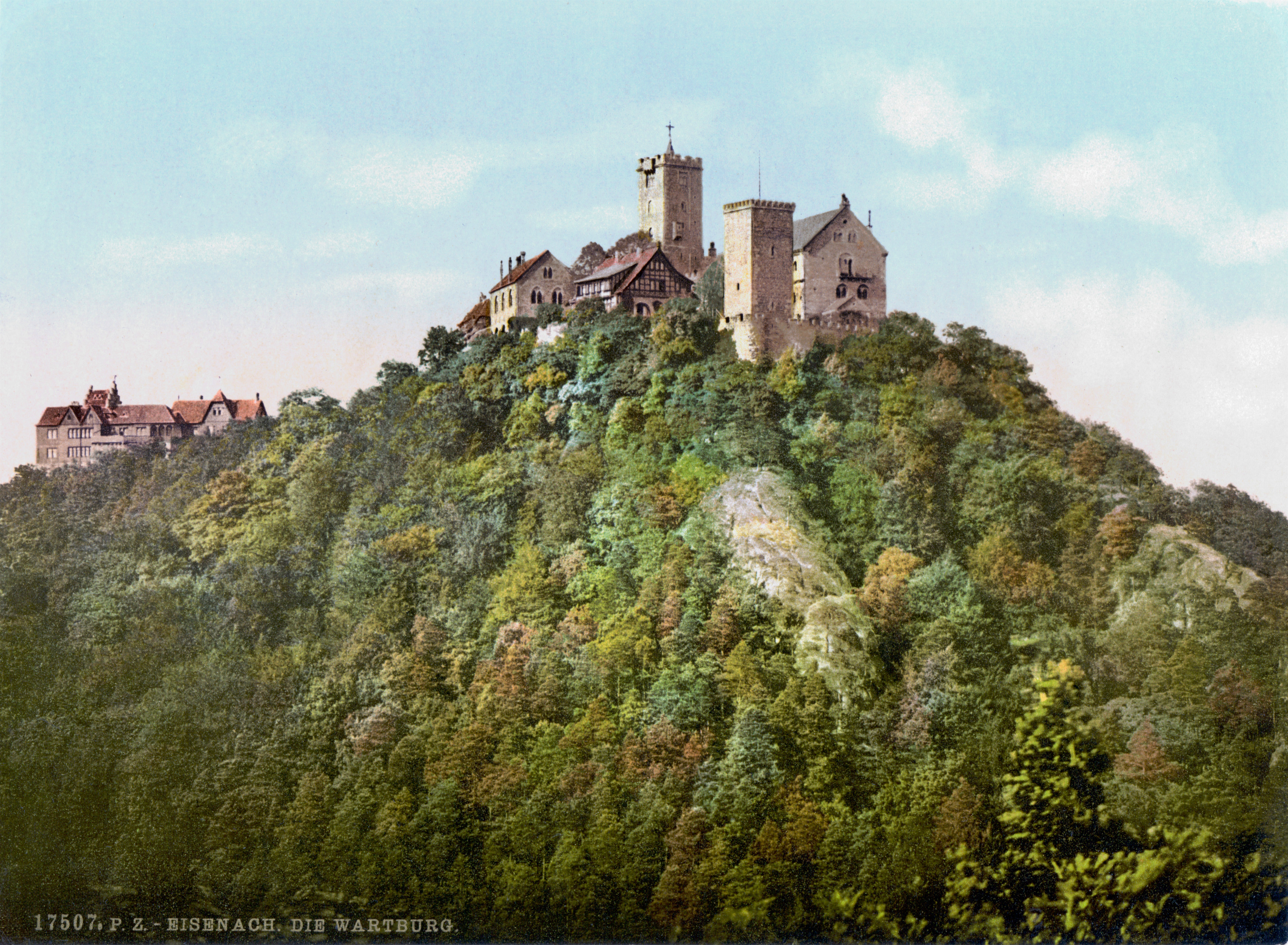
Wartburg c. 1890–1900, seen from the south-west

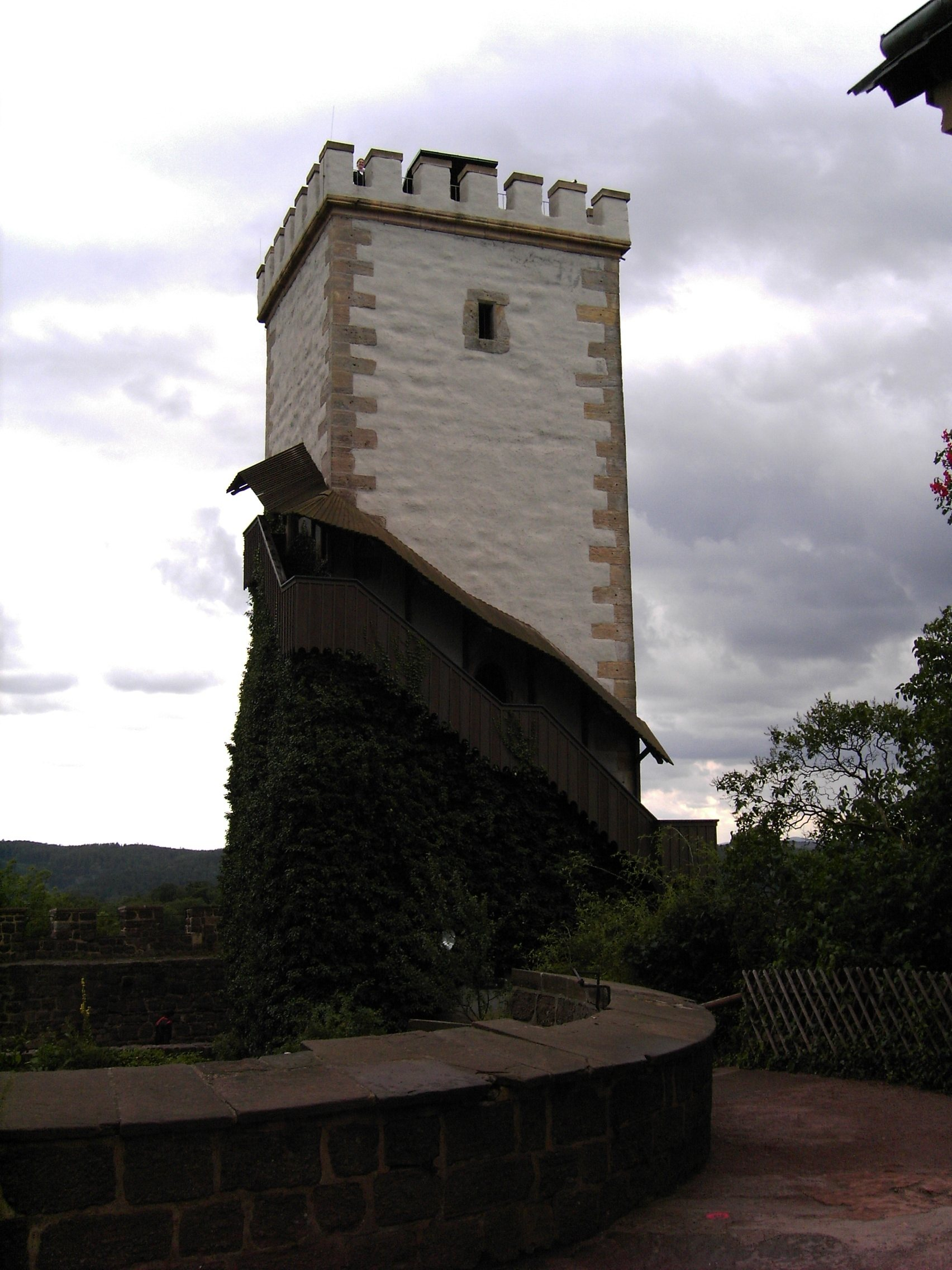
The South Tower

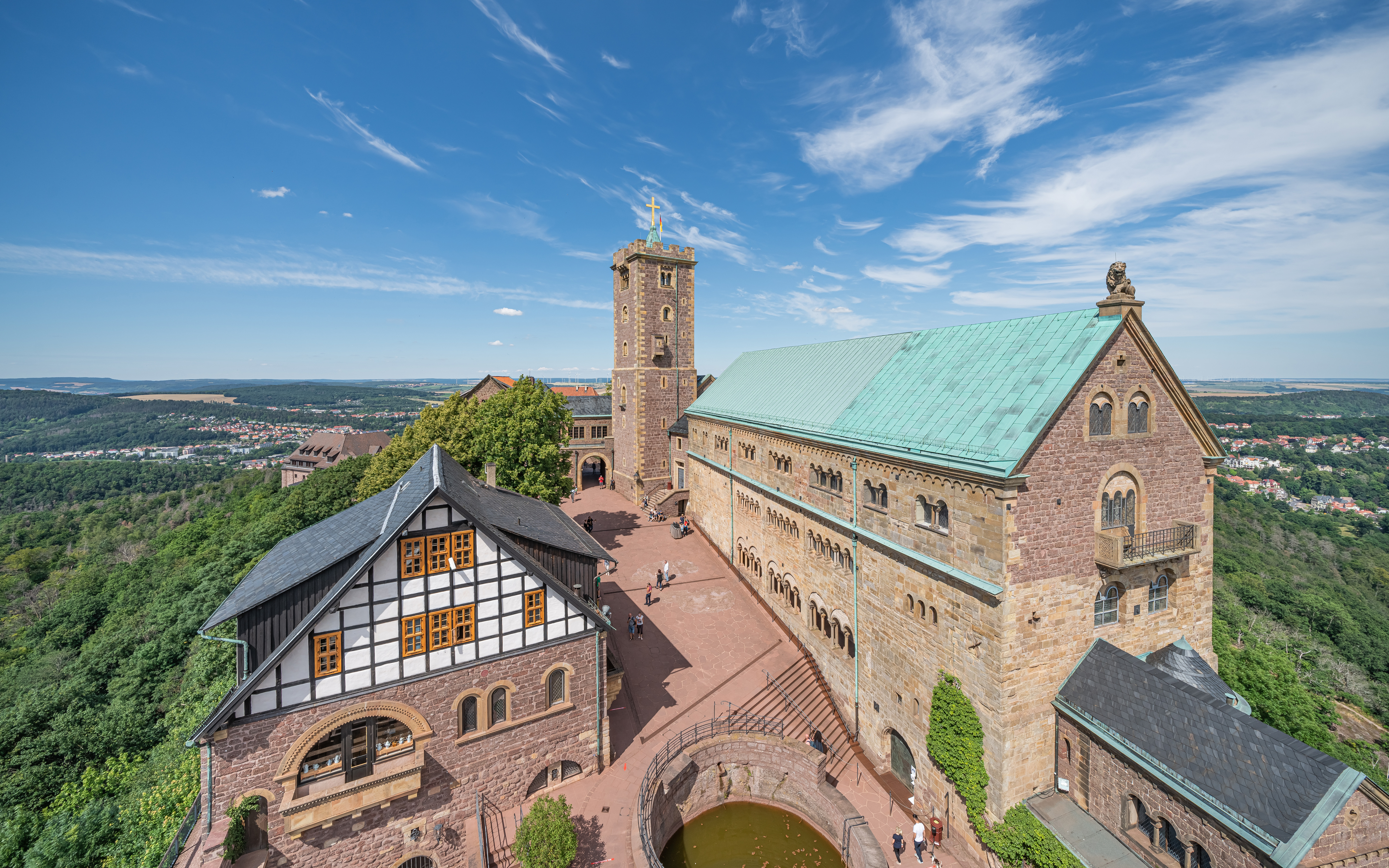
View of the courtyard from the South Tower. The Palas from around 1160 (right side) is considered the best-preserved non-ecclesial Romanesque building north of the Alps.

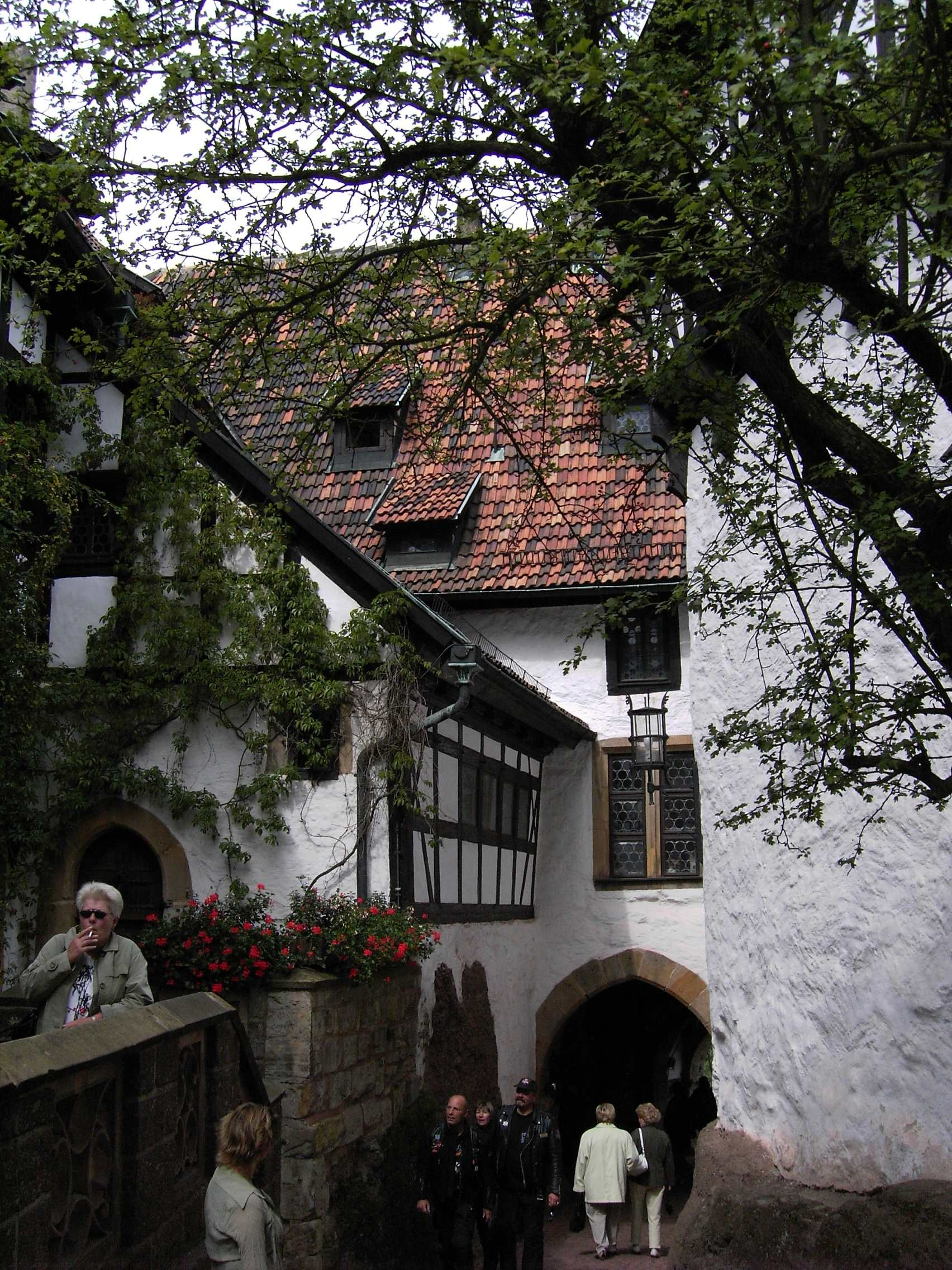
Main gate seen from the first courtyard
