= Henry III of Meissen =

Henry III
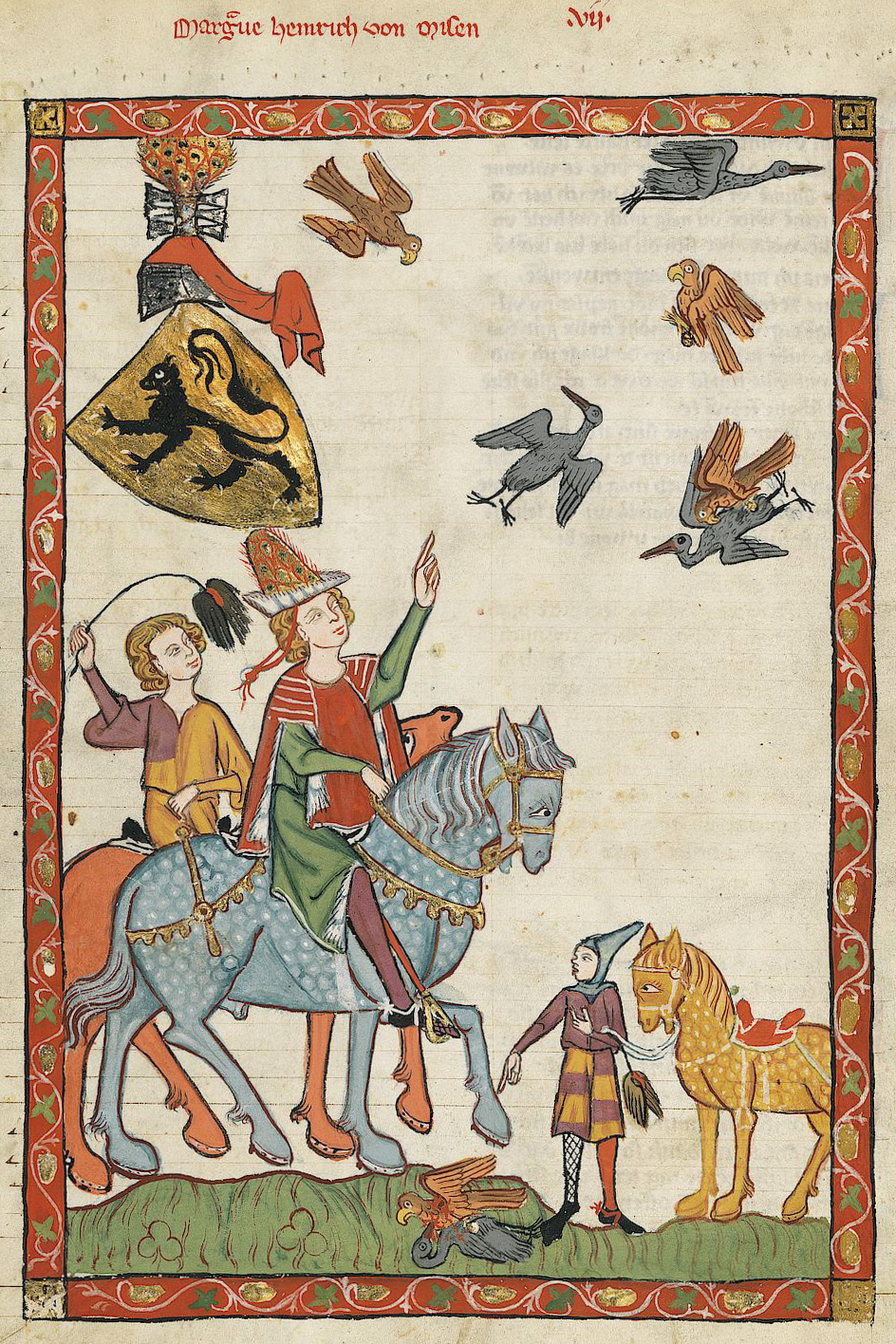
- Margrave Henry of Meissen, Codex Manesse

Margrave of Meissen
- Reign: 1221–1288
- Predecessor: Theodoric I
- Successor: Albert II
- Regent: Louis IV of Thuringia (until 1217); Albert I of Saxony (until 1230)

Margrave of Lusatia
- Reign: 1221–1288
- Predecessor: Theodoric II
- Regent: Louis IV of Thuringia (until 1217); Albert I of Saxony (until 1230)

Landgrave of Thuringia, Count Palatine of Saxony
- Reign: 1242–1265
- Predecessor: Henry Raspe
- Successor: Albert II
- Born: 1215; Meissen, Duchy of Saxony, Holy Roman Empire
- Died: 15 February 1288 (aged 72–73); Dresden, Duchy of Saxony, Holy Roman Empire
- Spouse: Constance of Babenberg; Agnes of Bohemia; Elisabeth von Maltitz
- Issue: Albert II, Margrave of Meissen; Theodoric of Landsberg
- House: Wettin
- Father: Theodoric I, Margrave of Meissen
- Mother: Jutta of Thuringia

Henry III, called Henry the Illustrious (German: Heinrich der Erlauchte; c. 1215 – 15 February 1288) from the House of Wettin was Margrave of Meissen and last Margrave of Lusatia (as Henry IV) from 1221 until his death; from 1242 also Landgrave of Thuringia.

== Life ==
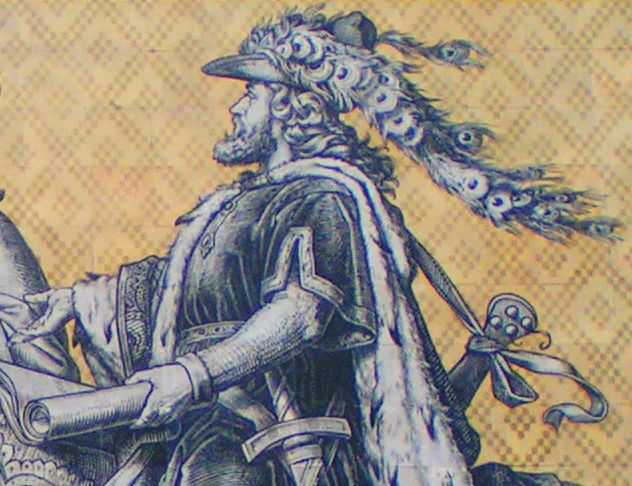
Henry in the Dresden Fürstenzug, 1907

Born probably at the Albrechtsburg residence in Meissen, Henry was the youngest son of Margrave Theodoric I, Margrave of Meissen and his wife Jutta, daughter of Landgrave Hermann I of Thuringia. In 1221 he succeeded his father as Margrave of Meissen and Lusatia, at first under guardianship of his maternal uncle, Landgrave Louis IV of Thuringia, and after his death in 1227, under that of Duke Albert I of Saxony. In 1230 he was legally proclaimed an adult.

Henry had his first combat experience in sometime around 1234, while on crusade in Prussia, fighting against the Pomesanians. His pilgrimage and company is well-documented by Peter of Dusburg, and it resulted in the construction of Balga castle, an important administrative centre for the Teutonic Knights. In 1245 after many years of conflict with the Ascanian margraves of Brandenburg, he was forced to cede the fortresses of Köpenick, Teltow and Mittenwalde north of Lower Lusatia. In 1249 however, the Silesian duke Bolesław II the Bald granted him the eastern area around Schiedlo Castle at the Oder river, where Henry founded the town of Fürstenberg.

In the struggle between the Hohenstaufen Emperor Frederick II and Pope Gregory IX, Henry took the side of the Emperor. In consideration, Frederick II in 1242 promised him the heritage of Henry Raspe as Landgrave of Thuringia and Count palatine of Saxony. In 1243 the Emperor also betrothed his daughter Margaret of Sicily to Henry's son Albert II.

Henry remained a loyal supporter of the Hohenstaufens and not before the departure of Frederick's son Conrad IV from Germany did he recognise the antiking William of Holland. After the death of Henry Raspe in 1247, he enforced his rights in Thuringia by military means in the War of the Thuringian Succession against the claims raised by Sophie of Thuringia, daughter of late Landgrave Louis IV, and her husband Duke Henry II of Brabant, as well as by Prince Siegfried I of Anhalt-Zerbst. After a long drawn-out war he detached the Landgraviate of Hesse in the west and gave it to Sophie's younger son Henry, but kept Thuringia, which he granted to his son Albert II together with the Palatinate of Saxony. The Thuringian acquisition significantly increased the Wettin territorial possessions, which now reached from the Silesian border at the Bóbr river in the east up to the Werra in the west, and from the border with Bohemia along the Ore Mountains in the south to the Harz range in the north.

From 1273 Henry was an important support to the newly elected Rex Romanorum Rudolph of Habsburg in his struggle against rivaling King Ottokar II of Bohemia. Against Bohemia he won, among other places, Sayda and Purschenstein Castle near Neuhausen,

He was known throughout the whole empire as a glittering prince, famous as a patron of the arts and a model knight, and as a significant minnesinger (not to be confused with Heinrich Frauenlob), poet and composer. Henry was patron of many tournaments and singing competitions, in which he also took part himself, and commissioned the famous Christherre-Chronik. He set to music hymns to be sung in the churches, by express permission of the pope.

== Family ==
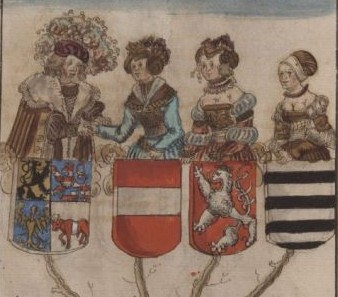
Henry and his three wives, from George Spalatin's Saxon chronicles, about 1520

In 1234 Henry married Constance of Babenberg, the daughter of Duke Leopold VI of Austria. Together they had two sons:

1. Albert II, Margrave of Meissen (1240–1314)
2. Theodoric of Landsberg (1242–1285)

As early as 1265 he attached the Imperial Pleissnerland around Altenburg, the dowry of his daughter-in-law Margaret, to the Landgraviate of Thuringia and gave both to his elder son Albert II, otherwise Albert the Degenerate. For his younger son Theodoric, Henry had created – though without imperial consent – the smaller Margraviate of Landsberg in the western part of the Lusatian lands around Leipzig. Henry kept for himself only the Margraviate of Meissen, the remaining Lower Lusatian lands, and a formal power of oversight. Only domestic disorders, caused by the unworthiness of his son Albert, clouded the later years of his reign and indeed, long after his death in 1288, led to the loss of Lusatia and Thuringia.

After the death of Constance in 1243 Henry took as his second wife Agnes (d. 1268), a daughter of King Wenceslaus I of Bohemia, and in his third marriage the daughter of a ministerialis, or serving knight, Elisabeth von Maltitz, who bore him Friedrich Clem (whose only daughter Elisabeth married Otto II, Prince of Anhalt-Aschersleben) and Hermann the Long.

== Ancestry ==
Ancestors of Henry III of Meissen

8. Conrad, Margrave of Meissen
4. Otto II, Margrave of Meissen
9. Luitgard von Ravenstein
2. Theodoric I, Margrave of Meissen
10. Albert the Bear
5. Hedwig of Brandenburg
11. Sophie of Winzenburg
1. Henry III, Margrave of Meissen
12. Louis II, Landgrave of Thuringia
6. Hermann I, Landgrave of Thuringia
13. Jutta Claricia of Hohenstaufen
3. Jutta of Thuringia
14. Frederick VI, Count Palatine of Saxony
7. Sophia of Sommerschenburg
15. Lutgard of Salzwedel

== Sources ==
- Lyon, Jonathan R. (2013). Princely Brothers and Sisters: The Sibling Bond in German Politics, 1100-1250. Cornell University Press.
- Pluskowski, Aleksander (2022). The Archaeology of the Prussian Crusade: Holy War and Colonisation. Routledge.14
- Rasmussen, Ann Marie (1997). Mothers and Daughters in Medieval German Literature. Syracuse University Press. ISBN 9780815603894.

Henry III of Meissen House of Wettin Born: c. 1215 Died: 15 February 1288
Regnal titles
Preceded by Henry Raspe	Count Palatine of Saxony; 1242–1288	Succeeded by Albert II
Preceded by Henry Raspe	Landgrave of Thuringia; 1242–1288	Succeeded by Albert II
Preceded by Theodoric I	Margrave of Meissen; 1221–1288	Succeeded by Albert II
