= Henry III of Brunswick-Lüneburg =

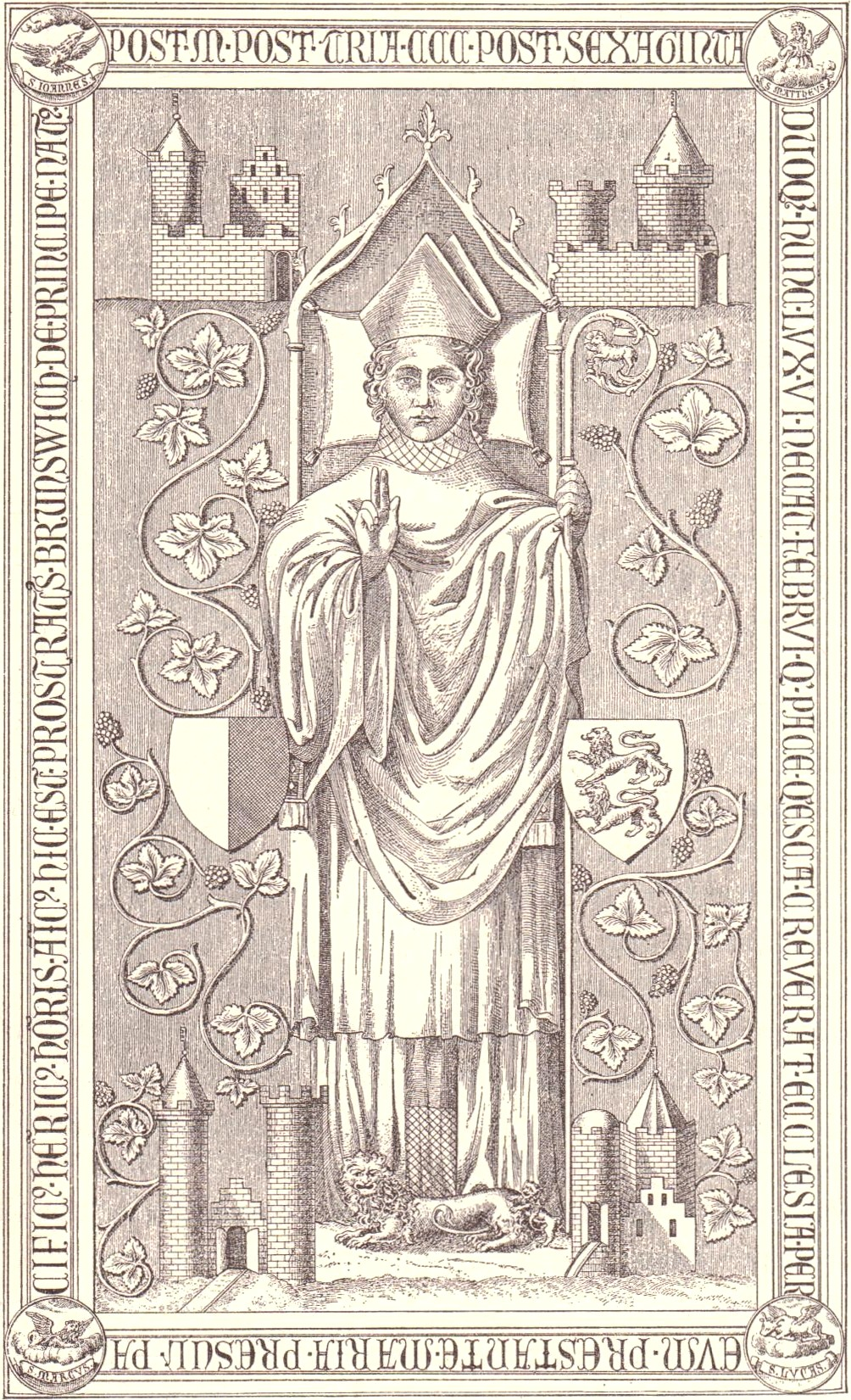
- A drawing date 1787 of the lost grave stone of Henry III, flanked by the coats of arms of the Bishopric of Hildesheim and the Duchy of Brunswik and Lüneburg. In the corners, four of castles he acquired are shown: Marienburg Castle, Wiedelah, Schladen and Wohlenstein Castle
- Born: c. 1296
- Died: 6 February 1363; Hildesheim
- Buried: Hildesheim Cathedral
- Noble family: House of Welf
- Father: Albert II, Duke of Brunswick-Lüneburg
- Mother: Rixa of Werle

Henry III of Brunswick-Lüneburg (c. 1296 – 6 February 1363 in Hildesheim) was the ruling Prince-Bishop of Hildesheim from 1331 until his death.

== Family ==
Henry was a member of the House of Welf and was therefore entitled to use the title Duke of Brunswick-Lüneburg. His father was Duke Albert II of Brunswick-Göttingen. His mother was Rixa; she was the daughter of Lord Henry I of Werle. His brothers were Duke Otto of Brunswick-Göttingen, Bishop Albert II of Halberstadt, Duke Magnus of Brunswick-Wolfenbüttel and Duke Ernest I of Brunswick-Göttingen.

== Struggle for power ==
In 1331, the majority of the cathedral chapter in Hildesheim elected Henry as their new bishop. However, his confirmation ran into considerable difficulties. His election had been confirmed by Baldwin of Luxemburg, who was administrator of Mainz at the time. However, the Pope had in the meantime appointed Henry III of Virneburg as the new Archbishop of Mainz, so that the confirmation by Baldwin lacked validity. Moreover, the previous bishop, Otto II had before his death handed over the reins of his bishopric to the Pope, so that the election by the cathedral chapter was of dubious validity. To add to the confusion, Pope John XXII had appointed Count Eric of Schaumburg and Holstein as the new bishop of Hildesheim.

Henry III did not accept this, and the Pope responded by excommunicating him. As he was supported by the cathedral chapter, the Dukes of Brunswick and the local nobility, he controlled the larger part of the bishopric, and Eric only controlled the city of Hildesheim and the monasteries.

Neither side controlled Dammstadt, a new settlement for Flemish immigrants, just outside the city of Hildesheim. In economic terms, Dammstadt was a prime competitor of Hildesheim, and the citizens of Dammstadt supported Henry. Eric attacked Dammstadt on Christmas Eve 1331 and destroyed the city. After this, he was forced to sign a cease fire agreement. Eric did not keep the promises he'd made in this agreement, an fighting broke out again. Henry won several battles and in 1346, Eric was forced to sign a new peace treaty, in which he ceded Hildesheim and Dammstadt to Henry.

== Supporters, followers and allies ==
The protracted dispute over the Bishopric of Hildesheim, and other conflicts intertwined with this dispute, provided Henry with an impetus to consolidate and expand the political relationships his predecessors had created with the nobility in the region. Throughout his pontificate, Henry was supported by a group of noble rulers, who at different times appear as his allies or his staff. Noblemen who were employed by Henry included Counts Conrad III and Conrad IV of Wernigerode, Counts John IV, Buchard VIII and Gerhard of Wohldenberg and Count Ludolf of Wohldenstein. Henry also had friendly relationships with the Counts of Blankenburg-Regenstein. Among the lower nobility, the Lords of Schwicheldt and the Lords of Gadenstedt served Henry in various offices and provided some special services. He enfeoffed them as a reward, and they played an important role in the complex web of his relations.

== Further activity ==
After Eric of Schauenburg died in 1352, Henry's excommunication was lifted. Pope Clement VI later confirmed all official act Henry had done during his excommunication. However, he reserved the fight to select Henry's successor to himself or a future Pope. In 1355, Henry received the regalia of his bishopric and was officially enfeoffed by the Emperor. In any case, the Emperor hardly had the power to intervene in the affairs of the bishopric. For example, when Emperor Charles IV tried to stop Henry from going to war against Nordhausen, Henry simply ignored him.

Domestically, he redeemed the pledges on a number of castles. In 1333, he had had to temporarily pledge the mint right to the city of Hildesheim. He also constructed or acquired new castles to the borders of his bishopric. Among these were Marienburg Castle (Hildesheim), Wiedelah, Schladen and Wohlenstein Castle. He also acquired the County of Schladen. He managed to keep his territory intact, despite the presence of the land-hungry Dukes of Brunswick. He further embellished Hildesheim Cathedral. He donated a benefice to fund the celebration of Corpus Christi.

Henry III died in 1363 and was buried in Hildesheim Cathedral.

== Footnotes ==
Henry of Brunswick and Lunenburg House of Welf Cadet branch of the House of Este Born: c. 1296 Died: 6 February 1363
Catholic Church titles
Regnal titles
Preceded by Otto II of Woldenberg	Prince-Bishop of Hildesheim; 1331-1363	Succeeded by Johann Schadland
