= Albert II of Brunswick-Wolfenbüttel =

Prince-archbishop

Albert II
- Prince-Archbishop of Bremen
- Church: Roman Catholic Church
- See: Prince-Archbishopric of Bremen
- In office: 1360–1395
- Predecessor: Godfrey I, Count of Arnsberg
- Successor: Otto II of Brunswick-Wolfenbüttel

Personal details
- Born: uncertain
- Died: 14 April 1395

Albert II of Brunswick-Wolfenbüttel (died 14 April 1395) was Prince-Archbishop of Bremen in the years 1361–1395.

== Before ascending to the See of Bremen ==
His name is given as Albrecht in the genealogies of the House of Welf. He was a son of Magnus I, Duke of Brunswick-Lüneburg, of Principality of Wolfenbüttel and his wife, Sophia of Brandenburg-Stendal.

Albert gained prebendaries as canon of the then Catholic cathedral in Magdeburg (then in the Prince-Archbishopric of Magdeburg) and as provost at the church of St. Pauli in Halberstadt (then in the Prince-Bishopric of Halberstadt).

Pope Clement VI had appointed Albert's predecessor Godfrey of Arnsberg, violating the Prince-Archbishopric's constitution, which reserved the privilege to elect the Prince-Archbishop to the Bremian Chapters of Bremen Cathedral and Hamburg Concathedral (with three votes). The Chapters for their part had elected Bremen's dean, Maurice of Oldenburg as Prince-Archbishop. Maurice served already since 1345 as administrator of the Prince-Archbishopric, appointed under his uncle then Prince-Archbishop Otto I (reigned 1345–1348). In a stalemate both agreed, that Godfrey would bear the title and Maurice wield the power, thus Godfrey confirmed Maurice as administrator and appointed him coadjutor, a position which usually included the expectancy of succession to the See. Later Godfrey, frustrated about Maurice' superior role, allied himself with Count Gerhard III of Hoya. The Count waged war on Maurice but the Prince-Archbishopric – with considerable support by Bremen – turned out to enjoy the fortunes of war and thus became a threat to the county. In 1358 Count Gerhard took some burghers of Bremen as hostages.

Thus Count Gerhard called on Duke Magnus, the eastern neighbour of the Prince-Archbishopric, for help. But Magnus demanded a reward, and – Gerhard meanwhile in a desperate situation – promised to help providing Magnus' son Albert with the Bremian See. Thus Count Gerhard had to convince his ally Godfrey to resign.

== Albert as Prince-Archbishop of Bremen ==
=== Gaining power and homage of the cities ===
Among the capitulars there was still a majority for their candidate Maurice, whom they had elected in the first place. Thus Magnus and Albert needed the help of Pope Innocent VI, to get Albert appointed as the new archbishop, again violating the Prince-Archbishopric's constitution and circumventing the Chapter. Albert was backed by the Guelphs and they achieved his papal appointment on 17 July 1360. In 1361 the Chapter accepted Albert as Prince-Archbishop after negotiations in Walsrode. Thus Albert called himself Albertus electus et confirmatus, even though this was the wrong chronology, since he had first been papally confirmed, lacking the capitulars' election, which he could heal by their acceptance in the year after. From 1362 on Albert sealed deeds using the title Prince-Archbishop of Bremen.

But obviously Gerhard did not quite succeed to make Godfrey resign. In 1362 he still sealed deeds as Prince-Archbishop of Bremen. And also Maurice refused to give up, supported by the city of Bremen. Thus Albert wanted to assert himself against Maurice.

In 1361 Stade's and Buxtehude's burghers and the free peasants of Altes Land welcomed Albert as new Prince-Archbishop. Generally the Landsgemeinden of the free peasants in the low marsh lands lived undisturbed under Albert's rule. In 1362 representatives of the burghers of the city of Bremen rendered homage to Albert at his fortress in Langwedel. In return Albert confirmed the city's privileges and brokered a peace between the city and the Count Gerhard III. The city was allowed to bail out the hostages held in Gerhard's captivity. In 1365 an extra tax, levied by the city council to finance the ransom, incited uproar of burghers and handcrafters, bloodily suppressed by the city council.

Meanwhile, Maurice had entrenched in the prince-archiepiscopal fortress in Vörde. Only after Albert's brothers Magnus II, Duke of Brunswick-Lüneburg, and Louis, and the latter's father-in-law William II, Duke of Brunswick-Lüneburg and their troops had beleaguered the fortress in January 1362, Maurice signed his resignation. In the following year Albert helped his second cousin Adolph VII, Count of Holstein-Kiel, and the city of Hamburg to free the streets northeast of the city from the brigandage by Eric II, Duke of Saxe-Lauenburg, and Albert V, Duke of Saxe-Lauenburg, conquering the latter's castle in Bergedorf.

In 1363 Albert concluded with the cities of the prince-archbishopric, Bremen, Buxtehude, Stade, and Wildeshausen as well as the free peasants of Osterstade a contract, organising the financing and provision of soldiers in case of war.

=== Deteriorating relations to the cities in the Prince-Archbishopric ===
Albert's government was objectless. In 1366 Albert tried to take his advantage from the dispute between the council of the city of Bremen and the gilds, whose members expelled some city councillors from the city (the Bannerlauf or "Hollemann's Turmoil". When these councillors appealed to Albert for help, many handcrafters and burghers regarded this treason against the city of Bremen. Appealing at princes would only provoke them to abolish city autonomy. In the night of 29 May 1366, Albert's troops invaded the city. After this the city had to render him homage again, the then wooden Bremen Roland, symbol of the city's autonomy, was burned and a new city council was appointed. In return the council granted Albert a credit amounting to the enormous sum of 20,000 Bremian Marks. But city councillors, who had fled to the County of Oldenburg gained support of the Count Konrad II, who recaptured the city for them on 27 June 1366. The members of the intermittent council were regarded traitors and beheaded and the city's autonomy restituted. Thereupon, the city of Bremen, since long rather holding an autonomous status, and the Bremian city of Stade acted almost in complete independence from the Prince-Archbishop. Albert failed to subject the city of Bremen a second time, since he was always short in money and without support by the Guelphs, who—after William II's death—fought the Lüneburg Succession War against the House of Ascania, imperially designate successor in the Principality of Celle.

In 1371 Albert's bailiff in Vörde erected the fortress Slikborch (near Neuhaus upon Oste) at the mouth of the river Oste into the Elbe as a stronghold to wield power over the Land of Kehdingen and to gain a stake in the neighboured Saxe-Lauenburgian exclave Land of Hadeln. In 1378 Albert reconciled with Eric II's son Eric IV, and signed a peace, concluding to settle future disputes – especially on the Land of Hadeln – without using violence. In 1387 the free peasants from Hadeln and Kehdingen demolished the fortress Slikborch as a threat to their autonomy.

Later Albert did not interfere in interior disputes. In 1380 he kept a low profile, when knights of the family von Mandelsloh and other Bremian and Verdian creditors of Albert tried to gain the pledged estates by violence, ravaging the city of Bremen and the entire Prince-Archbishopric of Bremen. The city of Bremen concluded a pact with the other cities, the Chapter, the Landsgemeinden of the free peasants of the marsh lands, and indigenous families of nobility and ministerialis to fight the exfrediation by the von Mandelslohs. By this pact the mentioned bodies and representatives established as the Estates of the Prince-Archbishopric (German: Stiftsstände; not to be confused with the estates). The cities, the major taxpayers in Prince-Archbishopric, stopped to transfer their taxes to Albert, but paid them to the Estates.

In 1381 the troops of the city of Bremen captured the castles in Kranenburg and in Bederkesa, the latter of which it could hold until the mid of the 17th century. In 1386 the city of Bremen made the noble families, holding the estates of Altluneburg (a part of today's Schiffdorf) and Elmlohe, its vassals. The cities and the nobility captured prince-archiepiscopal positions, since Albert was powerless.

=== Albert's spendthrift lifestyle and loss of power ===
Albert cultivated a prodigal lifestyle. He pledged prince-archiepiscopal estates in order to gain credits to finance his lifestyle. In 1369 the city of Bremen lent him against the collateral of his mint and his privilege of coinage, from then on run by the city council. In 1375 Albert pawned the bailiwick of Haseldorf north of the river Elbe to Adolph VII, Count of Holstein-Kiel and in 1377 Stedingen to Count Conrad II. Both territories were thus alienated and—as seen from the retrospect—ultimately lost for the Prince-Archbishopric of Bremen.

In 1368 Albert pledged his revenues from his residence, the castle in Vörde and the dues levied in the pertaining bailiwick, as well as those levied in Altes Land, Land of Kehdingen, and the parish district of Osten – all south of the Elbe – to his brother Magnus, holding the Principality of Wolfenbüttel and William II (Principality of Celle) for 4,150 Bremian Marks. On their instigation Albert appointed Daniel von Borch as administrator of the Prince-Archbishopric.

In 1389 the cities of Bremen, Buxtehude and Stade redeemed these pledges. They kept them for their own, gaining a powerful position in the Prince-Archbishopric, pushing its actual ruler aside. The cities appointed Albert's nephew Otto as regent of the Prince-Archbishopric, seated in Vörde. In 1391 Albert resigned himself to the Prince-Archbishopric's regent, his nephew Otto, who meanwhile had become the Prince-Bishop of Verden, concluding by way of contract that they would settle disputes without using violence. In 1389, however, Albert pawned the revenues of the bailiwick of Hagen im Bremischen to Conrad II in return for another credit of 500 gold guilders.

=== Humiliation of Albert II ===
In 1376, in the course of the Lüneburg Succession War (1370–1388) Johann von Zesterfleth, then dean of the Bremian Chapter, entered into psychological warfare and publicly alleged Albert were a hermaphrodite. To calm the public mood against him, Albert could not help it, but had to undergo body checks in different places within the Prince-Archbishopric, the greatest scandal, which hit the Prince-Archbishop.

Albert was the last in a row of Prince-Archbishops of the 14th century who ruined the Prince-Archbishopric. Albert bequeathed an indebtedness and a turmoil unheard of, pushing the Prince-Archbishopric deeply into decay.

== Ancestry ==
Ancestors of Albert II of Brunswick-Wolfenbüttel

16. Otto I, Duke of Brunswick-Lüneburg
8. Albert I, Duke of Brunswick-Lüneburg
17. Matilda of Brandenburg
4. Albert the Fat, Duke of Brunswick-Lüneburg
18. Boniface II, Marquess of Montferrat
9. Adelheid of Montferrat
19. Margaret of Savoy
2. Magnus the Pious, Duke of Brunswick-Lüneburg
20. Nicholas I, Prince of Mecklenburg-Werle
10. Henry I, Prince of Mecklenburg-Güstrow
21. Jutta of Anhalt
5. Rixa of Mecklenburg-Werle
22. Birger Jarl
11. Rikissa Birgersdotter
23. Ingeborg Eriksdotter of Sweden
1. Albert of Brunswick-Lüneburg (Wolfenbüttel line)
24. Albert II, Margrave of Brandenburg
12. John I, Margrave of Brandenburg
25. Matilda of Lusatia
6. Henry I, Margrave of Brandenburg-Stendal
26. Albert I, Duke of Saxony
13. Jutta of Saxony
27. Agnes of Thuringia
3. Sophie of Brandenburg-Stendal
28. Otto II Wittelsbach, Duke of Bavaria
14. Louis II, Duke of Bavaria
29. Agnes of the Palatinate
7. Agnes of Bavaria
30. Rudolf I of Germany
15. Matilda of Habsburg
31. Gertrude of Hohenberg

== Notes ==
Albert of Brunswick and Lunenburg, Wolfenbüttel line House of Welf Cadet branch of the House of Este Born: unknown Died: 14 April 1395
Regnal titles
Catholic Church titles
Preceded by Godfrey I of Arnsberg; 1348–1360	Prince-Archbishop of Bremen as Albert II; 1360–1395	Succeeded by Otto II of Brunswick-Wolfenbüttel; 1395–1406
