= Anna of Głogów =

Polish noblewoman

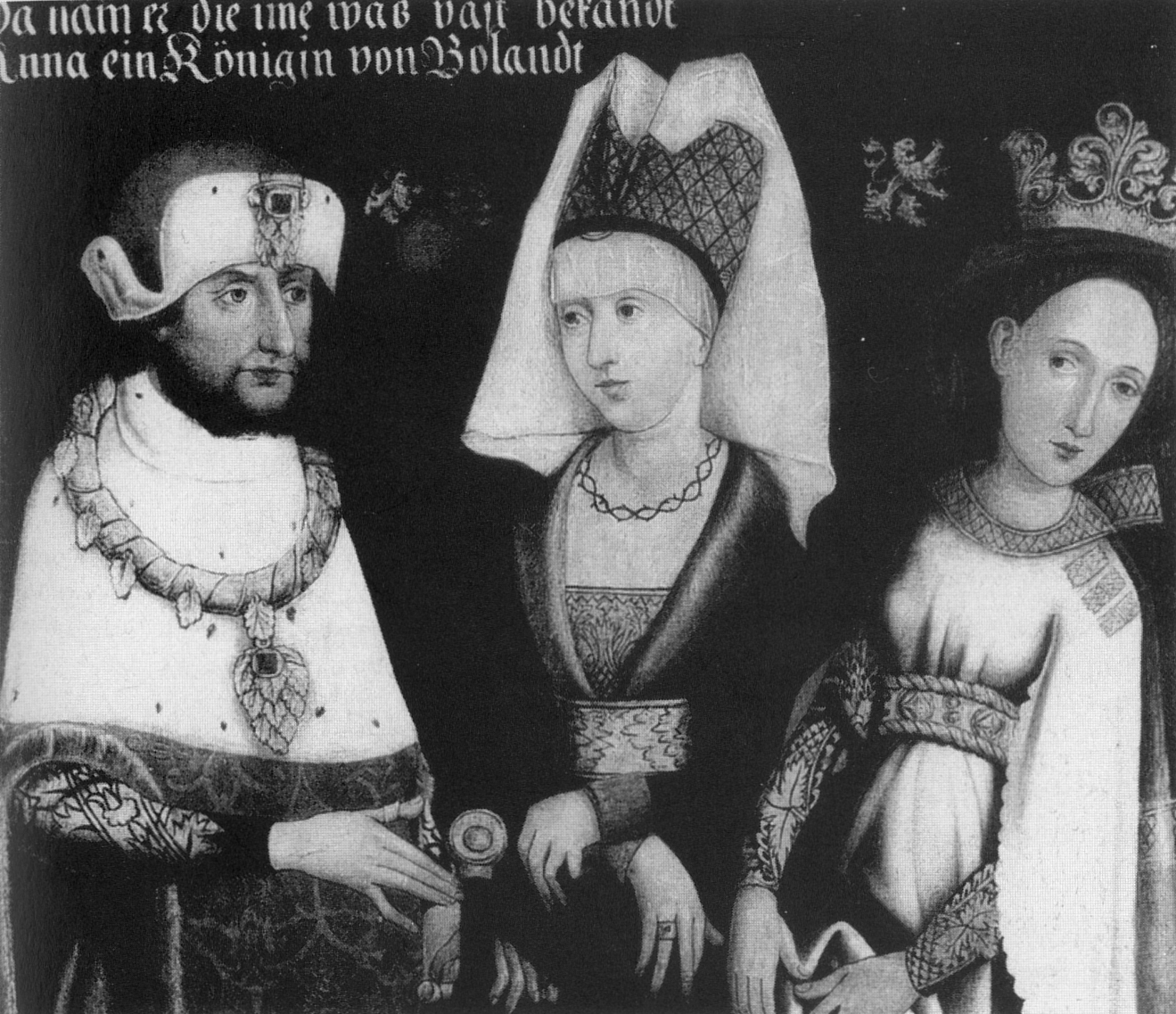
- Louis II (left) and his first two wives, Marie (centre) and Anna (right)
- Native name: Anna głogowska
- Born: 1250/52
- Died: 25 June 1271
- Noble family: House of Piast
- Father: Konrad I, Duke of Głogów
- Mother: Salome of Greater Poland

Anna of Głogów (Polish: Anna głogowska) (1250/52 – 25 June 1271) was the eldest child of Konrad I, Duke of Głogów and his first wife Salome of Greater Poland. Anna was a member of the House of Piast.

== Family ==
Anna's paternal grandparents were, Henry II the Pious and his wife, Anna of Bohemia. Anna's maternal grandfather was, Władysław Odonic, King of Poland. Anna's siblings included: Henry III, Duke of Głogów; successor to their father, Euphemia of Głogów; she was married to Albert I of Gorizia, Konrad II the Hunchback and Przemko of Ścinawa; he was killed in battle.

== Marriage ==
In 1260, Anna married Louis II, Duke of Bavaria. This was Louis' second marriage after his violent first marriage to Marie of Brabant, Louis had Marie executed because he believed she was having an affair. Louis' first marriage was childless.

Louis and Anna had two children, they were:

1. Maria (born 1261, date of death unknown), a nun in Marienburg (Malbork) abbey
2. Ludwig (13 September 1267 – 23 November 1290), killed at a tournament at Nuremberg.

Anna's son, Ludwig would have probably become Duke of Bavaria, but died at a tournament and he died before his father. Anna herself died in 1271. Her husband married one more time, to Matilda of Habsburg. Matilda bore Louis two surviving sons, their younger son was Louis IV, Holy Roman Emperor.

== Sources ==
- Kersken, Norbert (2021). "Poland and the Polish People in Late Medieval German Historiography". In Pleszczynski, Andrzej; Vercamer, Grischa (eds.). Germans and Poles in the Middle Ages. Brill.

Preceded by Marie of Brabant	Duchess of Upper Bavaria; With Elisabeth of Hungary; 1260–1271	Succeeded by Matilda of Habsburg
