= Albert of Brunswick-Lüneburg =

Albert of Brunswick-Lüneburg may refer to:

- Albert I, Duke of Brunswick-Lüneburg (1236–1279), also called Albert the Tall
- Albert II, Duke of Brunswick-Lüneburg (c. 1268–1318), also called Albert the Fat
- Albert I, Duke of Brunswick-Grubenhagen (c. 1339–probably 1383)
- Albert II, Duke of Brunswick-Grubenhagen (1419–1485)
- Albert II (bishop of Halberstadt) (c. 1294–1358)
- Albert II of Brunswick-Wolfenbüttel (died 1395), Archbishop of Bremen
