= Otto I of Brunswick-Göttingen =

Otto I, Duke of Brunswick-Göttingen
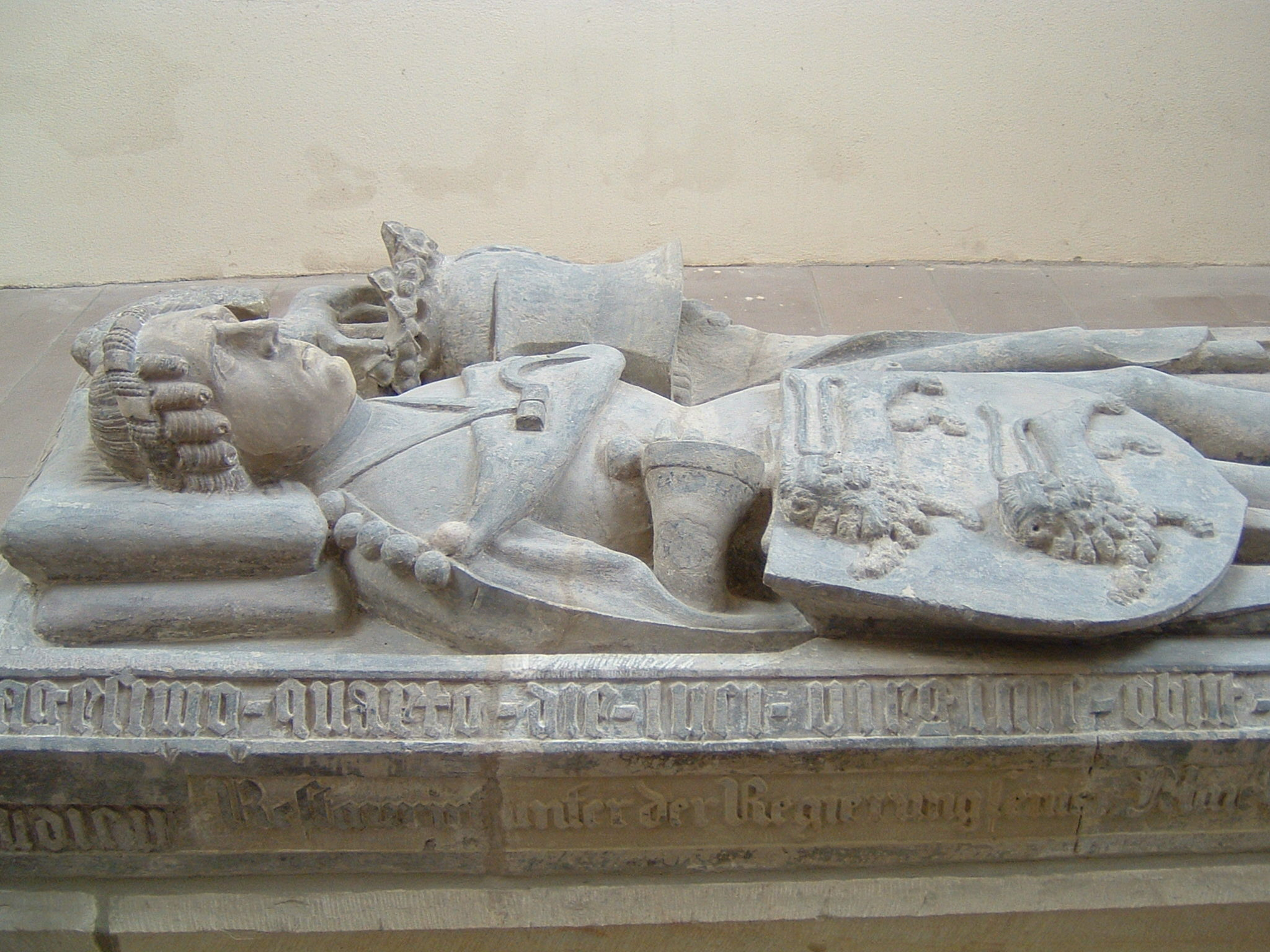
- Tomb of Otto the Evil in Wiebrechtshausen Monastery in Northeim. The head was restored in 1860
- Born: c. 1340
- Died: 13 December 1394; Hardegsen
- Buried: outside the church of Wiebrechtshausen Monastery in Northeim
- Noble family: House of Guelph
- Spouse: Margarethe of Jülich-Berg
- Issue: Otto II; Elisabeth
- Father: Ernest I, Duke of Brunswick-Göttingen
- Mother: Elisabeth of Hesse

Otto the Evil (c. 1340 – 13 December 1394, Hardegsen) was a member of the House of Guelph. He was a Duke of Brunswick-Lüneburg, from 1367 Duke in the Principality of Göttingen.

== Life ==
His father was Ernest I (1305–1367), who assumed power in the Principality of Göttingen in 1345. After several years of co-regency in 1367, Otto took up government in this small and economically weak principality. Otto initially resided in the city of Göttingen, where he also held several large jousting tournaments. Over time, however, he had a number of disputes with the citizens of the city.

Otto's contemporaries called him der Quade, which is Low German for "the evil". He received this nickname due to the almost unbroken series of feuds he was involved in. Otto has been described as a prominent representative of the former knighthood. He often allied himself with noble Knights to fight against other princes or against the cities, whose burgeoning power was anathema to him. During these clashes, Otto often changed sides. Sometimes, he fought several feuds simultaneously.

From 1367 onwards, he pursued hereditary claims to the Landgraviate of Hesse. He tried to enforce his claims in a military alliance with the knights in the Star League. At the same time, he fought in the Lüneburg War of Succession. At first, he fought on the side of Magnus II against the House of Ascania. He was able to secure the reign of Brunswick from 1374 to 1381. Ultimately, he failed in both Hesse and Brunswick and had to withdraw in exchange for financial compensation.

In 1387, he tried to impose his influence on the city of Göttingen, but had little success. In April, the citizens of Göttingen stormed the ducal castle inside the city walls. In return, Otto devastated villages and farmsteads in the area. In July, the citizens under captain Moritz von Uslar defeated him in a pitched battle between Rosdorf and Grone. In August, Otto was forced to recognize the freedom of Göttingen's possessions in the area.

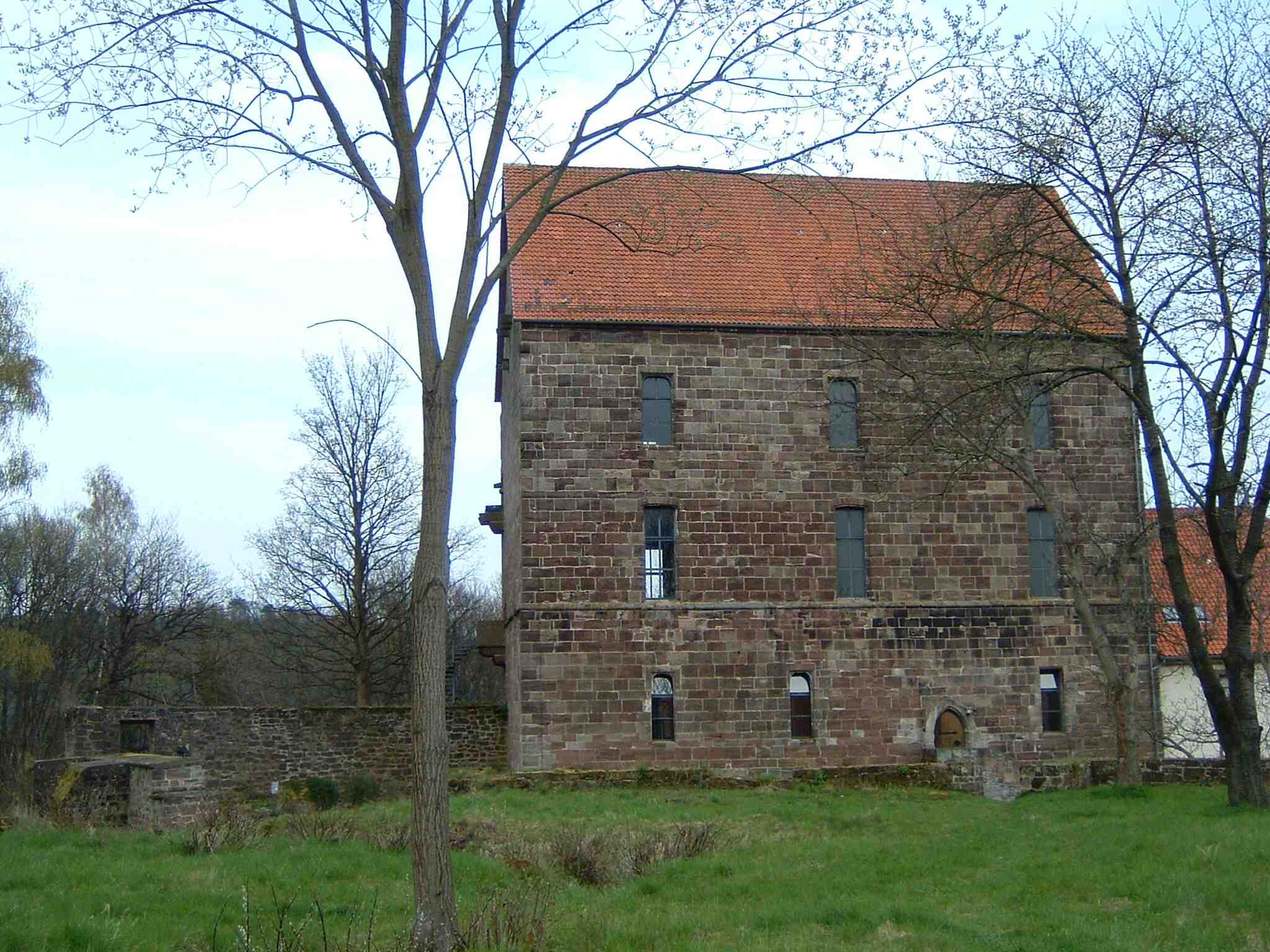
In the final years of life, Otto resided mostly at Hardeg Castle

After he was expelled from Göttingen, Otto had to reside in Hardegsen, where he had acquired Hardeg Castle in 1379 from the Lords of Rosdorf. By this time, he had been excommunicated, which is why he was buried in unhallowed ground north of the church of Wiebrechtshausen monastery at Northeim. He was later posthumously released from the excommunication. After that, a tomb was erected over his burial place and a chapel was built around it. The chapel was later connected to the church.

The final verdict on Otto I is negative, because he overestimated his powers and left himself weakened when he fought too many fights at once. He left a heavily indebted and politically disorganized country to his only son, Otto II.

== Marriage and issue ==
In 1379, he married Margarete (c. 1364 – 18 July 1442), a daughter of Duke William VII of Jülich-Berg. They had two children, a son, Otto II, who succeeded his father, and a daughter, Elisabeth, who married Eric I, Duke of Brunswick-Grubenhagen.

== Ancestors ==
Ancestors of Otto I of Brunswick-Göttingen

8. Albert I, Duke of Brunswick-Lüneburg
4. Albert II, Duke of Brunswick-Lüneburg
9. Adelheid of Montferrat
2. Ernest I, Duke of Brunswick-Göttingen
10. Henry I, Prince of Mecklenburg-Güstrow
5. Rixa of Werle
11. Rikissa Birgersdotter
1. Otto I, Duke of Brunswick-Göttingen
12. Otto I, Landgrave of Hesse
6. Henry II, Landgrave of Hesse
13. Adelheid of Ravensberg
3. Elisabeth of Hesse
14. Frederick I, Margrave of Meissen
7. Elisabeth of Thuringia
15. Elizabeth of Lobdeburg-Arnshaugk

Otto I of Brunswick-Göttingen House of Guelph Died: 1394
Preceded by Ernest I	Duke of Brunswick-Göttingen; 1367–1394	Succeeded by Otto II
