= Otto II of Brunswick-Göttingen =

Duke of Brunswick-Göttingen

Otto II the One-Eyed
- Duke of Brunswick-Lüneburg

Prince of Göttingen
- Reign: 1394–1463
- Born: c. 1380
- Died: 6 February 1463; Uslar, Brunswick-Lüneburg
- Noble family: House of Welf
- Spouse: Agnes of Hesse
- Issue: Margaret
- Father: Otto I, Duke of Brunswick-Göttingen
- Mother: Margaret of Jülich

Otto II of Brunswick-Göttingen (nicknamed Otto Cocles or Otto the One-eyed; c. 1380 – 6 February 1463), a member of the House of Welf, was Duke of Brunswick-Lüneburg and, after the death of his father Otto the Evil in 1394, ruling Prince of Göttingen.

== Life ==
Still a minor when he succeeded to the throne, he initially had to accept the tutelage of his cousin Frederick I, ruling Prince of Brunswick-Wolfenbüttel, until he was declared to have reached majority by King Wenceslaus in 1398. His father had left him a financially and politically ruined country. Unlike his warlike father, Otto remained a peace-loving ruler. He managed to restore political order, but was not able to resolve the financial problems.

For the maintenance of law and order, he allied with the cities in the region, such as Uslar, Seesen and Gandersheim, to fight against powerful robber barons. He succeeded in 1407, together with the citizens of Göttingen 1407, in storming the castle at Jühnde, while also forcing the Lords of Adelebsen, Hardenberg and Schwicheldt to respect the public peace.

Due to permanent financial constraints, he had to borrow money repeatedly from his Wolfenbüttel cousins and in exchange promised them the succession in Göttingen already in 1395. When Duke Frederick I of Brunswick-Wolfenbüttel died in 1400, Otto had to sign an inheritance treaty with his surviving brothers Bernard I and Henry the Mild. Nevertheless, Otto's financial situation became untenable. As early as 1435, he withdrew from the business of government and gave the cities and Estates a free rein.

Otto's agreement met with reservations by the Welf princes of Brunswick-Wolfenbüttel, William the Victorious and his brother Henry the Peaceful. They had shared the rule but decided to divide their principality in 1432, due to the increasing number of disputes between the two of them. They also had divided the castles Otto had given them as collateral for his many loans. When a dispute arose between Henry and William about the sovereignty in Göttingen, Otto returned from retirement and sided with Henry against William. In 1441, he occupied the castle at Münden. After lengthy negotiations and pressure exerted by King Albert II of Germany, the dispute was finally settled in 1442: Otto retained the city and castle of Uslar, his wife received Münden, Dransfeld and Sichelstein. Seesen and Gandersheim were separated from the Brunswick-Göttingen principality and attached to Henry's part of Brunswick-Wolfenbüttel. William, in turn, received the concession from Henry and the Dukes of Lüneburg that he could rule Brunswick-Göttingen until Otto's death.

Duke Otto II retired to Uslar, where he lived a life of seclusion for more than 20 years until his death in 1463.

== Marriage and issue ==
Probably around 1408, Otto married Agnes (d. 16 January 1471), a daughter of Landgrave Hermann II of Hesse. He had been engaged to her sister Elizabeth, but she died before the wedding. Otto and Agnes had two daughters: Elizabeth, who died young, and Margaret, who married Duke Henry of Schleswig in 1425.

Since Otto II left no male heir, the Brunswick-Göttingen line of the House of Welf died out when he died in 1463. The Göttingen principality passed to William the Victorious and, effectively from 1495, merged into the Principality of Calenberg, which was sometimes called Brunswick-Calenberg-Göttingen afterwards.

== Ancestors ==
Ancestors of Otto II of Brunswick-Göttingen

8. Albert II, Duke of Brunswick-Lüneburg
4. Ernest I, Duke of Brunswick-Göttingen
9. Rixa of Werle
2. Otto I, Duke of Brunswick-Göttingen
10. Henry II, Landgrave of Hesse
5. Elisabeth of Hesse
11. Elisabeth of Thuringia
1. Otto II, Duke of Brunswick-Lüneburg
12. Gerhard VI of Jülich, Count of Berg and Ravensberg
6. William VII of Jülich, 1st Duke of Berg
13. Margaret of Ravensberg
3. Margaret of Jülich
14. Rupert II, Elector Palatine
7. Anna of the Palatinate
15. Beatrice of Sicily, Electress Palatine

== See also ==
- House of Guelph
- Duchy of Brunswick-Lüneburg

Otto II of Brunswick-Göttingen House of Welf
Preceded by Otto I	Duke of Brunswick-Lüneburg; Prince of Göttingen; 1394–1463	Succeeded by William III as Prince of Calenberg-Göttingen
