= Sophie of Landsberg =

Coat-of-arms of the House of Wettin.

Sophie of Landsberg (Polish: Sophie z Landsberg, German: Sophie von Landsberg) (ca. 1259 – 24 August 1318) was a princess from the Holy Roman Empire. She was a member of the House of Wettin and by marriage Duchess of Glogau.

She was the eldest child and eldest daughter of Dietrich the Wise, Margrave of Landsberg, by his wife Helena, daughter of John I, Margrave of Brandenburg.

== Life ==
On 24 October 1266 was issued in Augsburg by Duke Louis II of Upper Bavaria a settlement, under which he pledged several possessions on behalf of his ward and nephew Conradin, King of Sicily and Jerusalem. This action was made in order to pay the expenses incurred in connection of the marriage celebrated between Conradin and Sophie, who took place by the end of October and early September of that year, possibly in the city of Bamberg or Nürnberg. The union was celebrated by proxy (desponsatio per procuratinem), because the fourteen-years-old King was absent at that moment. In his place, Duke Louis II stood as groom and signed the marriage contract.

Conradin never saw his bride: soon after the marriage, he departed with his friend Frederick I, Margrave of Baden to Italy with the purpose to recover his rights over Frederick II's inheritance, and two years later, on 29 October 1268, the last legitimate male member of the House of Hohenstaufen was beheaded in the Piazza del Mercato of Naples.

The validity of Conradin and Sophie's marriage is still disputed by historians. According to some of them, the contract signed by Louis II was only a betrothal and not truly a marriage ceremony, because Sophie was still a child at that time (she was almost seven-years-old) and Conradin never saw her; this is supported by the fact that the chronicler Bartholomaeus of Neocastro found a message of Conradin to Giovanni Frangipani, in whose castle he refuged after the Battle of Tagliacozzo, in which he promised to marry with his daughter in exchange for his help against Charles I of Anjou. However, other historians support the idea that Sophie and Conradin were, in fact, legally married, because the contract signed by Louis II was clearly a marriage by proxy with all the legal obligations.

In 1271, the twelve-years-old Sophie married with Konrad I, Duke of Glogów, an almost forty-years-old widower. They had no children.

After Konrad I's death in 1274, Sophie returned to her homeland and became a nun in the monastery of St. Clara in Weissenfels, where she later was elected Abbess. Sophie held this post until her death.
