= Konrad I, Duke of Głogów =

Konrad I
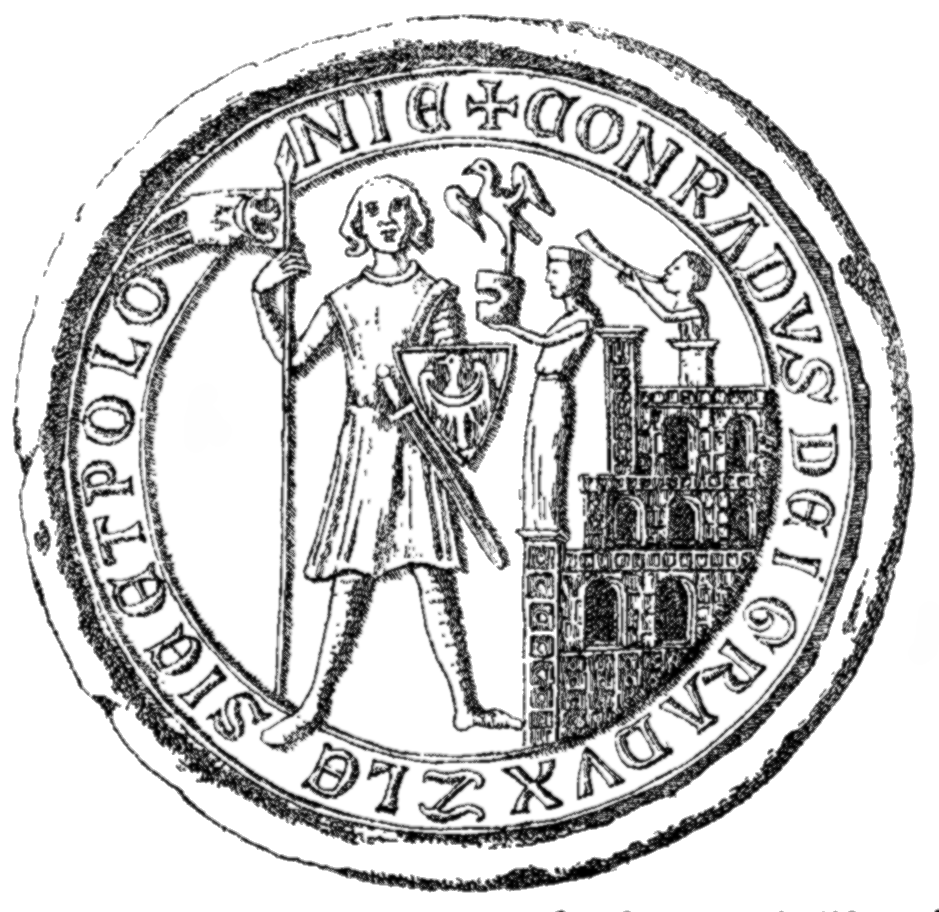
- Konrad of Głogów on a 1253 seal

Duke of Głogów
- Reign: 1249–1274
- Predecessor: none
- Successor: Henry III
- Born: 1228/29
- Died: 6 August 1273/74
- Spouse: Salome; Sophie of Landsberg
- Issue: Anna of Głogów; Henry III, Duke of Głogów; Konrad II the Hunchback; Przemko of Ścinawa; Euphemia of Głogów; Jadwiga
- House: Silesian Piasts
- Father: Henry II the Pious
- Mother: Anna of Bohemia

Konrad I of Głogów (Polish: Konrad I głogowski; c. 1228/29 – 6 August 1273/74), a member of the Silesian Piasts, was Silesian duke of Głogów from 1249/50 until his death.

== Life ==
Konrad was the fourth son of Henry II the Pious, Duke of Silesia and High Duke of Poland, and Anna, daughter of the Přemyslid king Ottokar I of Bohemia. At the time of his father's death in the 1241 Battle of Legnica against the Golden Horde, he and his younger brother Władysław were placed under the guardianship of their eldest brother Duke Bolesław II Rogatka. After Henry's sudden death, the Silesian Piasts were not able to maintain their dominant position: Bolesław II tried to succeed his father on the Polish throne at Kraków, but eventually could not prevail against his Piast cousin Konrad I of Masovia.

In order to avoid further fragmentation of the paternal lands, the elder duke, with the approval of their mother, sent Konrad to study in Paris, where he was to be educated with the intention of becoming a priest in the future. However, in 1248, when the young man found out about the division of the family lands between his older brothers Bolesław II, ruling as a Duke of Legnica, and Henry III the White, Duke at Wrocław, he returned to the country and claimed his part of the Silesian inheritance. Soon a preliminary agreement was reached under which Konrad remained under the protection and care of his older brother, who gave him the title of co-ruler in Legnica.

Bolesław II (who wanted to get rid of him) still proposed Konrad for spiritual posts: first, as Provost of Głogów Cathedral, and then Bishop of Passau in Bavaria. Though he had not reached the canonical age, he was elected by the Passau cathedral chapter to succeed the deposed bishop Rüdiger of Bergheim; however, without approval by the Roman Curia. Konrad, nevertheless, didn't have any intention of pursuing an ecclesiastical career. He never entered Passau and soon resumed his conflict with Bolesław II.

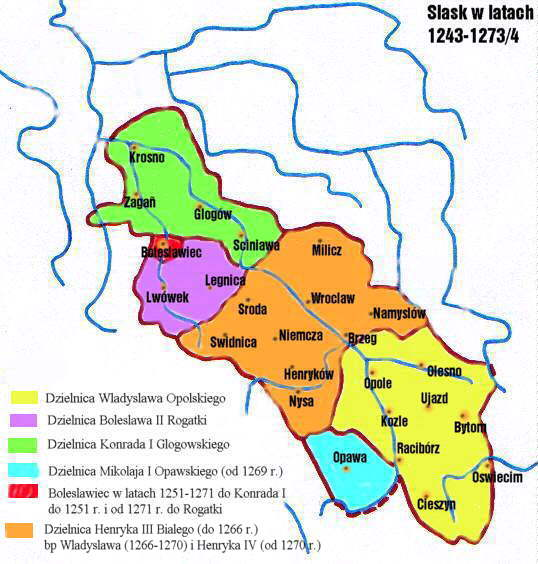
Partition of Silesia 1249–1273, Konrad's Duchy of Głogów in green

In June 1249 Konrad fled to Greater Poland, where he could count on the support of Duke Przemysł I. In 1251 he campaigned Bolesław's ducal lands and he managed to conquer Bytom Odrzański. Konrad's bonds with the Piast dukes of Greater Poland were reinforced after his marriage with Przemysł I's sister Salome. His other brother Henry III the White soon became another ally in the fight against Bolesław II. With the help of his new allies, and thanks to the revolt of the townspeople of Głogów, the campaign against Bolesław II ended in complete success. The Duke of Legnica was forced to accept his defeat and give the Lower Silesian lands of Głogów up to Krosno Odrzańskie and Żagań to Konrad as a duchy in his own right.

Until the end of his life Konrad's relations with his brother Bolesław II remain strained. In 1257 Konrad made a dangerous move and kidnapped Bolesław from his residence in Legnica. The duke regained his freedom after a few months, but it is unknown at what price. It can be said that after that the duke never left Bolesław II a moment of happiness, but in 1271 the Duke of Legnica managed to regain the town of Bolesławiec near the Bóbr river.

Around 1255, Konrad founded the collegiate church in Głogów, Lower Silesia. By about 1300, sculpted figures of the duke and his wife, Salome, were installed around the choir area.

From about 1260 Konrad established closer contacts with the Kingdom of Bohemia and became involved in the expansionist politics of King Ottokar II. Also he promoted the colonization in his lands, mostly by German settlers. This was a decisive contribution to the institution of the Magdeburg town law in his Głogów residence in 1253. In contrast to his brother Bolesław II, Konrad vigorously supported Bishop Thomas I of Wrocław in his defence of church rights. However, when the bishop died in 1268 Konrad began to violate the privileges conferred by him, which led to conflicts with the new Bishop Thomas II Zaremba.

At the end of his life he founded a church in Zielona Góra (now a Co-cathedral) dedicated to his grandmother, St. Hedwig of Silesia. The church was completed only twenty years after his death by his son and heir Henry III.

== Marriages and children ==
In 1249 Konrad contracted his first marriage to Salome (b. ca. 1225 - d. April 1267/74), daughter of Duke Władysław of Greater Poland. They had:

1. Anna (b. 1250/52 - d. 28 May 1271), married on 24 August 1260 to Duke Louis II of Upper Bavaria.
2. Henry III (b. 1251/60 - d. 9 December 1310).
3. Konrad II the Hunchback (b. 1252/60 - d. 11 October 1304).
4. Euphemia (b. 12 January 1251/52 - d. 1266-74), married by 13 May 1266 to Count Albert I of Gorizia.
5. Przemko (b. 1255/65 - d. killed in battle, Siewierz, 26 February 1289).
6. Jadwiga (b. 1265? - d. 9 June 1318), Abbess of St. Klara, Wrocław (1283).

By 1271/74, Konrad married his second wife, Sophie (b. ca. 1259 - d. 24 August 1318), daughter of Dietrich the Wise, Margrave of Landsberg (second son of Henry III, Margrave of Meissen) and – according to some sources – widow of the last legitimate male member of the House of Hohenstaufen, Conradin, King of Sicily and Jerusalem. They had no children.

== See also ==
- Beatrix von Silesia

== Sources ==
- Crossley, Paul (2002). "The Architecture of Queenship: Royal Saints, Female Dynasties and the Spread of Gothic Architecture in Central Europe". In Duggan, Anne J. (ed.). Queens and Queenship in Medieval Europe: Proceedings of a Conference Held at King's College London, April 1995. The Boydell Press. pp. 263–300. ISBN 9780851158815.
- Davies, Norman (1982). God's Playground: A History of Poland. Vol. I: The Origins to 1795. Columbia University Press. ISBN 0-231-05350-9.
- Chronological Dates in Stoyan ("object not found" 7 Jan 2020)
- KONRAD I GŁOGOWSKI

Konrad I, Duke of Głogów Silesian Piasts Born: c. 1228-31 Died: 6 August 1273/74
New title	Duke of Legnica; 1248–1251 with Bolesław II	Succeeded by Bolesław II
New title	Duke of Głogów; 1251–1274	Succeeded by Henry III
