= Magnus the Pious =

Magnus the Pious may refer to:

- Magnus the Pious, Duke of Brunswick-Lüneburg, (died 1369)
- Magnus the Pious (Warhammer), fictional character in Warhammer Fantasy
