= Upper Hesse =

The term Upper Hesse (German: Provinz Oberhessen) originally referred to the southern possessions of the Landgraviate of Hesse, which were initially geographically separated from the more northerly Lower Hesse by the County of Ziegenhain.

Later, it became the name of one of the three provinces in the Grand Duchy of Hesse (and the People's State of Hesse after World War I), which was located within the historical region; the other two were Starkenburg (capital: Darmstadt) and Rhenish Hesse (capital: Mainz). Its territory covered the area of land north of the River Main. The provincial capital and largest town of the rural provinces was the university town of Gießen.

== Geography ==
Upper Hesse lies in the German state of Hesse. It is bounded in the south by the Wetterau and Rhine-Main Region, in the east by the Vogelsberg, and the Knüll, in the north by the Kellerwald and in the west by the Gladenbach Uplands. The landscape is characterised by low mountains. Today the nature parks of the Lahn-Dill Uplands and the High Vogelsberg as well as the regions of Marburg and Giessen belong to the Upper Hesse.

== History ==
Due to the practice of partible inheritance, the lands of Upper and Lower Hesse were partitioned into separate states several times. All of the rulers of the partitions were considered to be Landgraves.

The first was between the sons of Henry I "the Child" in 1308, when Henry's older son Otto I received Upper Hesse, or the "Land on the Lahn"; his younger sibling John received Lower Hesse. The two partitions were reunited three years later when John died without an heir.

The second partition occurred in 1458 following the death of Louis I of Hesse: his first son, Louis II, received Lower Hesse, while his second son, Henry III, received Upper Hesse. The partitions remained separate until the death of William III of Upper Hesse in 1500, when it was inherited by William II of Lower Hesse.

The third partition took place after the death of Philip I in 1567. This time, rather than being divided in two, Hesse was divided into four: Hesse-Kassel, Hesse-Rheinfels, Hesse-Marburg and Hesse-Darmstadt.

On the eve of the French Revolution (1789), most of historic Upper Hesse lay within northern Hesse-Darmstadt, except for the area around Marburg, which was part of Hesse-Kassel. During the course of the German mediatization and Napoleonic Wars, Hesse-Darmstadt gained territory from several former states contiguous with Upper Hesse, primarily from Solms-Laubach and the Principality of Isenburg. These territories were reorganised into the Province of Upper Hesse. Also during this period Hesse-Darmstadt became the Grand Duchy of Hesse.

The provinces of the Grand Duchy were dissolved on 31 July 1848 and replaced by administrative regions (Regierungsbezirke); this was reversed on 12 May 1852.

Following the Austro-Prussian War in 1866, Prussia annexed all of the Electorate of Hesse (the former Hesse-Kassel), which included some Upper-Hessian areas such as Marburg, as well as all of Lower Hesse. They also annexed the Grand Duchy's north-western panhandle around Biedenkopf. These territories, along with those gained from the Duchy of Nassau and the Free City of Frankfurt, become the Prussian province of Hesse-Nassau in 1868. However, the bulk of Upper Hesse remained with the Grand Duchy, which became a member state of the German Empire when it was created in 1871. At the end of World War I, the Grand Duchy fell during the German revolution of 1918–1919, and the new People's State of Hesse, with Upper Hesse as one of its three provinces, became a state of the Weimar Republic. After World War II, Upper Hesse was part of the territory that was combined with Hesse-Nassau to create today's State of Hesse.

Evolution of Upper Hesse
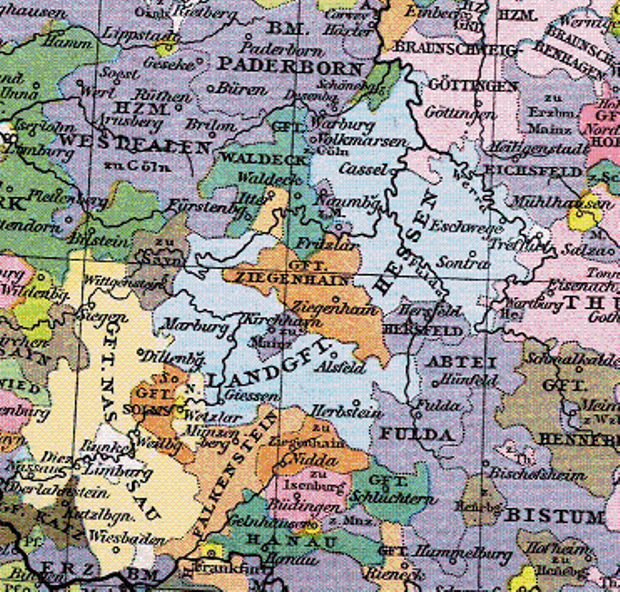
Medieval division of Hesse (sky blue), c. 1400. Upper Hesse is the more southerly territory.

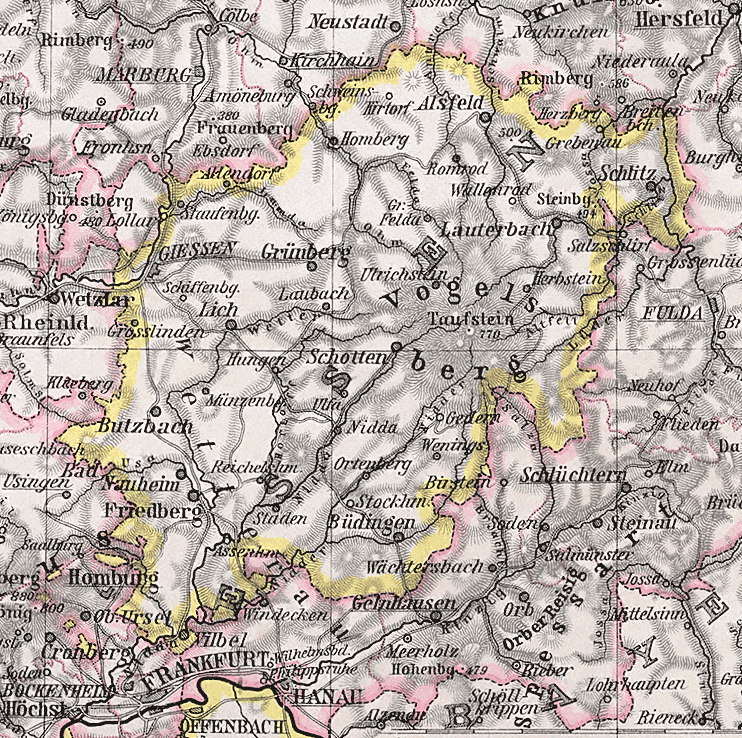
Province of Upper Hesse, 1905

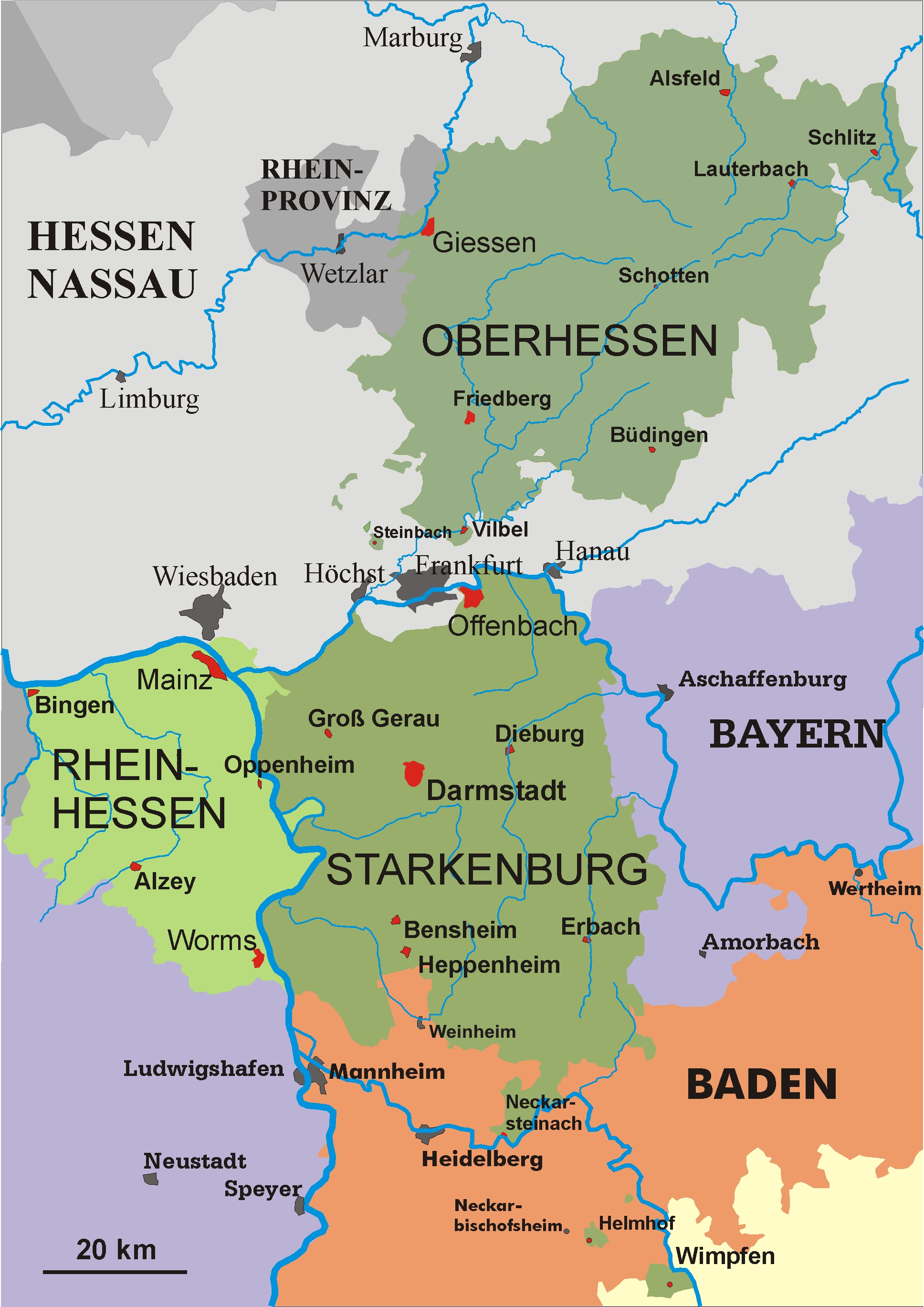
Upper Hesse (top right) as one of the provinces of the People's State of Hesse in 1930.
