= John, Landgrave of Lower Hesse =

Landgrave of Lower Hesse

- Died: 1311; Kassel
- Buried: Ahnaberg monastery, Kassel
- Noble family: House of Hesse
- Spouse: Adelaide of Brunswick-Lüneburg (m. 1306)
- Father: Henry I, Landgrave of Hesse
- Mother: Mechthild of Cleves

Landgrave John of Lower Hesse (c. 1278 – 14 February 1311) was a son of Landgrave Henry I of Hesse, from his second marriage with Mechthild of Cleves. John reigned from 1308 to 1311 as Landgrave in Lower Hesse.

== Inheritance dispute ==
From 1292, there was an inheritance dispute in the House of Hesse, between Henry's sons from his two marriages, as his second wife demanded a share for her own children. This led to armed clashes which lasted until Henry's death. Henry the Younger, Henry's oldest son from his first marriage to Adelaide of Brunswick, had been co-ruler from 1284. At Mechtild's insistence, John was made co-ruler in 1296. Henry the Younger died in 1298 and his brother Otto I took his place. The inheritance was eventually divided after Henry died in 1308. John received Lower Hesse with the capital Kassel and the imperial fiefs. His half-brother Otto I received the Land of the Lahn, the later Upper Hesse, with the capital Marburg. Otto's part did not include imperial fiefs.

== Reign ==
Hesse had mortgaged Gudensberg to the Duchy of Brunswick-Lüneburg. In 1309, John conquered the city and forced Duke Albert II of Brunswick-Göttingen to accept his repayment. Emperor Henry VII appointed him protector of the free imperial cities of Mühlhausen, Nordhausen and Goslar. Margrave Frederick I saw this as an intrusion into his Landgraviate of Thuringia and took up arms to stop the intrusion. The fight went badly for John and he had to retire to Kassel to recover.

== Death ==
John died of the plague on 14 February 1311 in Kassel. He was buried in the Ahnaberg monastery. No further hostilities between John and Frederick took place and John's plan to create a new fortified city on the Thuringian side of the river Fulda was never implemented.

After John's death, Lower Hesse fell to Otto I.

== Family ==
In 1306, John married Adelaide of Brunswick-Lüneburg, the daughter of Duke Albert II of Brunswick-Göttingen. Like her husband, she died of the plague in 1311 in Kassel. She was buried beside her husband in Annaberg monastery, Saxony.

John and Adelaide had a daughter, Elisabeth (d. 1339). She married Otto VI of Ochsenstein.

== Footnotes ==
John, Landgrave of Lower Hesse House of Hesse Died: 1311
Preceded by Henry I as Landgrave of Hesse	Landgrave of Lower Hesse; 1308-1311	Succeeded by Otto I as Landgrave of Hesse
