= Henry II of Brandenburg-Stendal =

Henry II
- Margrave of Brandenburg-Stendal
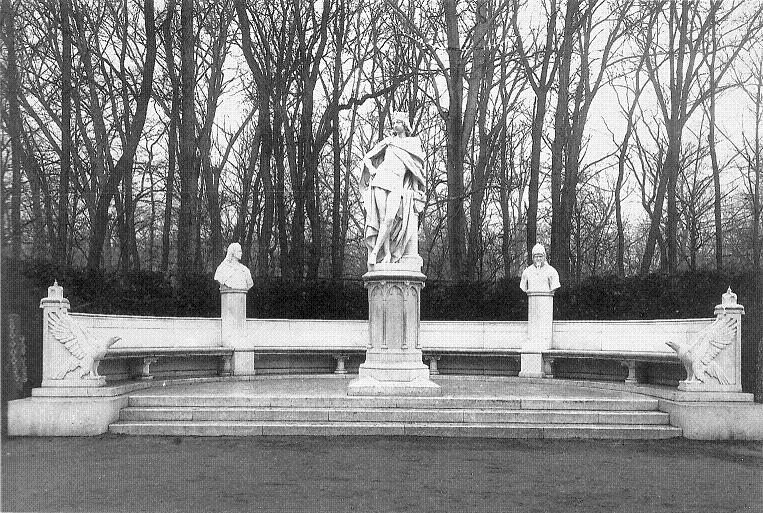
- Henry II, Margrave of Brandenburg-Stendal
- Born: c. 1308
- Died: July 1320; Bärwalde, Neumark
- Noble family: House of Ascania
- Father: Henry I, Margrave of Brandenburg-Stendal
- Mother: Agnes of Bavaria

Henry II of Brandenburg-Stendal, nicknamed Henry the Younger or Henry the Child (German: Heinrich das Kind; c. 1308 – July 1320) was the last margrave of Brandenburg from the House of Ascania.

== Life ==
Henry's parents were Margrave Henry I of Brandenburg-Stendal and Agnes, a daughter of the Wittelsbach duke Louis II of Bavaria. Henry II had three older sisters.

In 1319, at the age of 11, Henry II was to succeed his cousin, Margrave Waldemar, who had died childless. The Pomeranian duke Wartislaw IV took the occasion to set himself up as regent and used this position to promote his own interests in the long-time Brandenburg–Pomeranian conflict. In turn, Henry's Ascanian relative, Duke Rudolph I of Saxe-Wittenberg intervened and tried to take over the regency. King Louis IV, half-brother of Henry's mother Agnes, finally declared him an adult, though he did not enfeoff him with Brandenburg.

Henry's early death in 1320 prevented him from acting independently, moreover, it also meant the end of the Brandenburg line of the Ascanian dynasty. As a completed fief, the Margraviate fell back to the Wittelsbach king Louis IV, who enfeoffed his eldest son Louis V (called "the Brandenburger") with Brandenburg in 1323.

== Statue ==
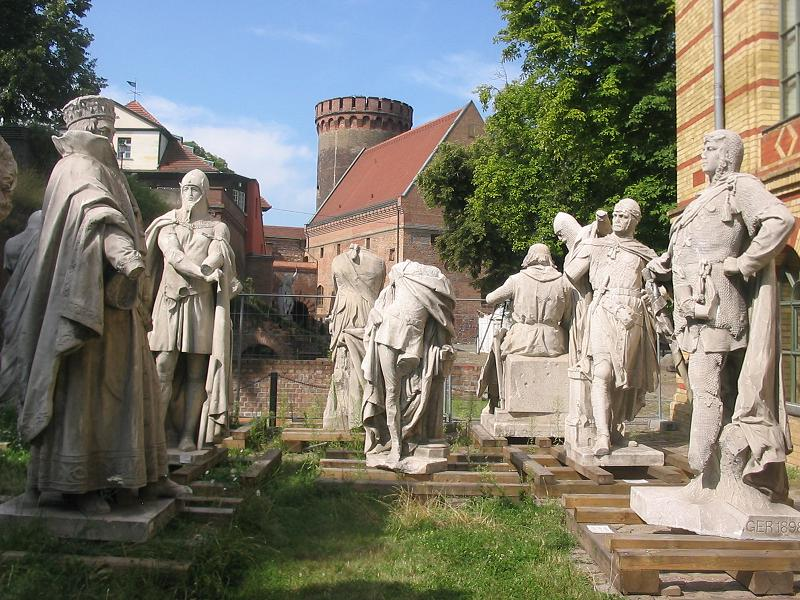
Statue of Henry (centre), Spandau Citadel

A statue of Henry II by the sculptor August Kraus (1868-1934) was unveiled on 22 March 1900 on the former Siegesallee boulevard in Berlin. Kraus used the young French cellist Paul Bazelaire, who happened to be visiting Berlin, as a model for the statue. Together with busts of Henry's guardian, Duke Wartislaw IV of Pomerania and the knight Wedigo von Plotho (modeled on Kraus' friend Heinrich Zille), it formed statue group #9.

Severely damaged in World War II, the statue is currently on display at the Spandau Citadel.

== See also ==
- False Waldemar

== Footnotes ==
Henry II of Brandenburg-Stendal House of Ascania Born: c. 1308 Died: July 1320
Preceded by Waldemar	Margrave of Brandenburg; 1319–1320	Vacant Escheated to King Louis IV of Germany Title next held by Louis I
