= Henry I of Hesse =

First Landgrave of Hesse

Henry I
- Landgrave of Hesse
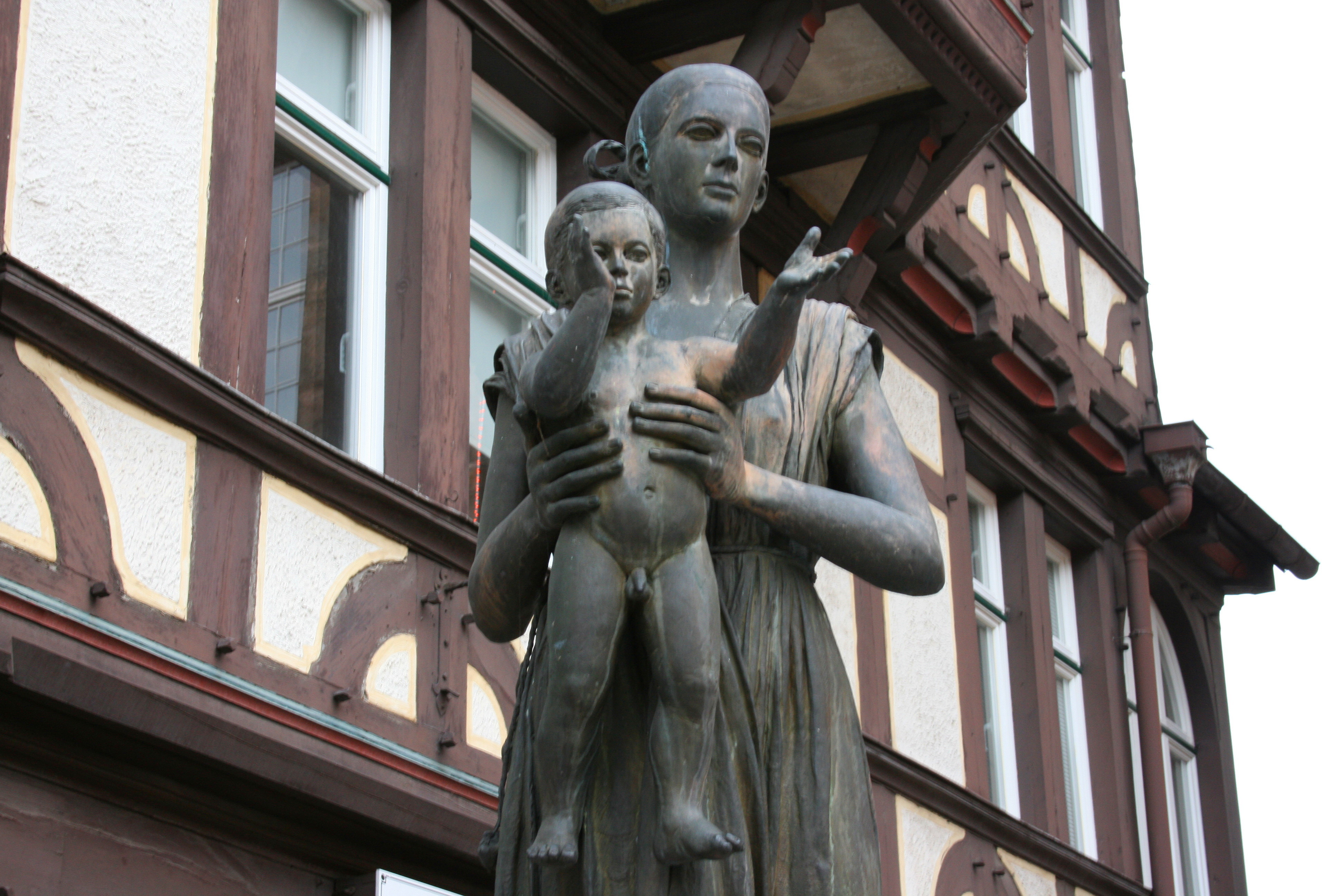
- Statue of Sophie of Thuringia, and her son Henry in Marburg
- Born: 24 June 1244
- Died: 21 December 1308 (aged 64); Marburg
- Noble family: Hesse (founder); Reginar
- Spouses: Adelheid of Brunswick-Lüneburg (m. 1263; died 1274) Mechthild of Cleves (m. 1276)
- Issue: Sophia; Henry the Younger; Matilda; Adelheid; Elisabeth; Otto I, Landgrave of Hesse; John, Landgrave of Lower Hesse; Elisabeth; Agnes; Louis; Elisabeth; Katharina; Jutta
- Father: Henry II, Duke of Brabant
- Mother: Sophie of Thuringia

Henry I of Hesse "the Child" (German: Heinrich das Kind) (24 June 1244 – 21 December 1308) was the first Landgrave of Hesse. He was the son of Henry II, Duke of Brabant and Sophie of Thuringia.

== Life ==
In 1247, as Heinrich Raspe, Landgrave of Thuringia, died without issue, conflict arose about the future of Thuringia and Hesse. The succession was disputed between Heinrich Raspe's nephew and his niece: Sophie was the daughter of Heinrich Raspe's brother Ludwig IV and claimed the territories on behalf of her son Henry, while Henry the Illustrious, margrave of Meissen, was the son of Heinrich Raspe's sister Jutta. Another competitor were the Archbishops of Mainz, who could claim Hesse was a fiefdom of the archbishop and now, after the extinction of the Ludowingians, demanded its return to them. Sophia, supported by the Hessian nobility, succeeded in retaining Hesse against her cousin, who in 1264 accepted the division of the Ludowingian inheritance: Henry of Meissen received Thuringia, while Sophia's son Heinrich would inherit Hesse. In the following year, the Archbishop Werner II von Eppenstein acceded to this outcome in the Treaty of Langsdorf, accepting Henry as his liege-man and Landgrave of Hesse.

At this time, the landgraviate of Hesse consisted of the region between Wolfhagen, Zierenberg, Eschwege, Alsfeld, Grünberg, Frankenberg and Biedenkopf. In the same year, Henry acquired a part of the county of Gleiberg with Gießen from the Counts palatine of Tübingen. The landgraviate was centred on the towns of Kassel, where Henry took up his residence since 1277, and Marburg, where his grandmother Saint Elisabeth was buried and where Henry built the Castle Marburg.

=== Struggle for possession of Naumburg ===
Henry again got into conflict with his liege-lord, the Archbishop, about the possession of Naumburg. On behalf of the Archbishop, Henry was outlawed in 1274 by King Rudolf I of Habsburg, but after Henry had supported Rudolph in the war against Otakar II of Bohemia and had helped to conquer Vienna 1276, Rudolph reinstated Henry. In 1290 Henry defeated the Archbishop in the battle of Fritzlar and could henceforth maintain his territory.

Though Henry never relinquished his own claim on Brabant, he supported his nephew John of Brabant against Guelders and Luxembourg in the Limburg succession war.

=== Elevation to prince of the realm ===
On 12 May 1292, Henry was made a Reichsfürst (prince of the realm) by King Adolf of Nassau, freeing Hesse of the supremacy of the Archbishop of Mainz. Henry was bestowed with Eschwege and the Boyneburg (with Sontra), strengthening his position in Hesse. By skillful diplomacy he gained the cities of Sooden-Allendorf, Kaufungen, Witzenhausen, Immenhausen, Grebenstein, Wanfried, Staufenberg, Trendelburg and Reinhardswald.

In 1263 Henry had married Adelheid of Brunswick, daughter of Duke Otto of Brunswick, who bore him four daughters and the sons Henry ("the Younger") and Otto. After Adelheid's death in 1274, Henry had married Mechthild, daughter of Dietrich VI, Count of Cleves, who bore him another four daughters and the sons John and Louis.

=== Uncertainty over succession ===
In 1292 internal conflict arose about the question of Henry's successor. Mechthild of Cleves demanded on her sons receiving a share of the heritage, while Henry and Otto, Henry's sons by his first wife, insisted on excluding their half-brothers from the inheritance. This led to civil war lasting throughout the rest of Henry's lifetime.

Henry died in Marburg during the conflict, and was buried there in St. Elisabeth's Church, which became the gravesite of the succeeding Landgraves for several more centuries. After his death, the inheritance was divided between Otto, who received Upper Hesse (Oberhessen) around Marburg, and John, who received Lower Hesse (Niederhessen), centred on Kassel. John's younger brother Ludwig had entered the clergy and became bishop of Münster in 1310.

== Children ==
First marriage (1263) to Adelheid, daughter of Otto I, Duke of Brunswick-Lüneburg (1244–1274)

1. Sophia (1264–after 12 August 1331), married 1276 to Otto I, Count of Waldeck.
2. Henry the Younger (1265–23 August 1298), married in 1290 to Agnes of Bavaria, Margravine of Brandenburg-Stendal.
3. Matilda (1267–after 1332), married to:
  1. 1283 Count Gottfried of Ziegenhain;
  2. after 11 October 1309 Philipp III of Falkenstein-Münzenberg.
4. Adelheid (1268–7 December 1315), married 1284 to Count Bertold VII of Henneberg-Schleusingen.
5. Elisabeth (1269/70–19 February 1293), married c. 1287 to Count Johann of Sayn (bg).
6. an unnamed son (c. 1270–c. 1274).
7. Otto (c. 1272–17 January 1328).

Second marriage (1276) to Mechthild of Cleves,

1. John (died 1311, Kassel).
2. Elisabeth (c. 1276–after 6 July 1306), married to
  1. 1290 Duke William of Brunswick-Wolfenbüttel;
  2. 1294 Gerhard of Eppstein.
3. Agnes (c. 1277–1335), married to Burgrave John I of Nuremberg.
4. Louis (1282/83–18 August 1357), Bishop of Münster in 1310–57.
5. Elisabeth (died after 30 October 1308), married in 1299 to Count Albert II of Gorizia.
6. Katharina (died 1322), married to Count Otto IV of Orlamünde.
7. Jutta (died 13 October 1317), married 1311 to Duke Otto of Braunschweig-Göttingen.

== Ancestry ==
Ancestors of Henry I of Hesse

8. Godfrey III of Leuven
4. Henry I, Duke of Brabant
9. Margaret of Limburg
2. Henry II, Duke of Brabant
10. Matthew, Count of Boulogne
5. Mathilde of Boulogne
11. Marie I, Countess of Boulogne
1. Henry I, Landgrave of Hesse
12. Hermann I, Landgrave of Thuringia
6. Louis IV, Landgrave of Thuringia
13. Sophia of Wittelsbach
3. Sophie of Thuringia
14. Andrew II of Hungary
7. Elisabeth of Hungary
15. Gertrude of Merania

== Sources ==
- Morganstern, Anne McGee (2000). Gothic Tombs of Kinship in France, the Low Countries, and England. The Pennsylvania State University Press.
- Rasmussen, Ann Marie (1997). Mothers and Daughters in Medieval German Literature. Syracuse University Press.

Regnal titles
Preceded by Title created	Landgrave of Hesse; 1264–1308	Succeeded by Otto I the Elder (Upper Hesse); John (Lower Hesse)
