= Salome of Greater Poland =

Salome of Greater Poland also known as Salomea Odonicówna (literally 'daughter of Odonic'; Polish: Salomea wielkopolska or Odonicówna; c. 1225 – April 1267?), was a Polish princess member of the Piast dynasty from the Greater Poland branch and by marriage Duchess of Głogów.

She was the third child but the eldest daughter of Duke Władysław Odonic of Greater Poland by his wife Jadwiga.

== Life ==
In June 1249 Konrad I of Głogów (after escaping from his older brother Bolesław II the Bald's intentions to make him a priest) arrived in Greater Poland and made an agreement with Duke Przemysł I, who promised Konrad I to support him against Bolesław II. In order to reinforce his bonds with his new ally, the Duke of Głogów decided to marry Przemysł I's sister, Salome. The wedding took place in Poznań and was blessed by Pelka, Archbishop of Gniezno and Bogufał II, Bishop of Poznań.

Little is known about Salome's rule as Duchess consort of Glogów. It's generally assumed that she maintained a good and close relationship with her brothers in Greater Poland. She was also a generous donor to the monasteries of St. Mary Magdalene in Nowogrodziec and the Dominican establishment of Glogów.

During her marriage, Salome gave birth to six children, three sons —Henry III, Konrad II the Hunchback and Przemko— and three daughters —Anna (by marriage Duchess of Upper Bavaria), Euphemia (by marriage Countess of Gorizia) and Hedwig (later Abbess of St. Klara, Wrocław).

The exact date of Salome's death is ranked between 1265 and 1267; the only certain fact is that she died before her husband. Her remains were placed in the Dominican monastery of Glogów. According to the Polish Chronicle of Peter of Byczyny, Salome died surrounded by a halo of sanctity. However, there were no traces of a beatification process.

In the Kolegiata of Our Lady in Głogów a Gothic sculpture was made that represented Salome. Today, the sculpture is kept in the National Museum of Poznań.
