= Agnes of Bavaria, Margravine of Brandenburg =

German noblewoman (1276–1345)

Agnes of Bavaria
- Margravine of Brandenburg
- Born: 1276
- Died: 1345 (aged 68–69)
- Spouses: Henry the Younger of Hesse (m. 1290; died 1298) Henry I, Margrave of Brandenburg-Stendal (m. 1303; died 1318)
- Issue: Agnes; Henry II, Margrave of Brandenburg-Stendal; Sophia of Brandenburg; Judith
- Father: Louis II, Duke of Bavaria
- Mother: Matilda of Habsburg

Agnes of Bavaria (1276–1345) was a daughter of Duke Louis II of Upper Bavaria and his third wife, Matilda of Habsburg.

In 1290, in Donauwörth, she married Henry "the Younger" of Hesse (1265 – 23 August 1298), a son of Landgrave Henry I of Hesse (1244–1308). They had at least one child:

- Agnes, married to Gerlach I, Count of Nassau (c. 1285–1361).

In 1303, she remarried to Margrave Henry I of Brandenburg-Stendal (1256–1318). From her second marriage, she had three children:

- Henry II "the Child" (1308–1320).
- Sophia (1300–1356), heiress of Landsberg and the County Palatine of Saxony, married in 1327 to Duke Magnus of Brunswick-Wolfenbüttel (1304–1369).
- Judith/Jutta (b.1302–b.1330), married in 1318 to Duke Henry II, Duke of Brunswick-Lüneburg of Brunswick-Grubenhagen (b.1296–a.1351).
