= Otto I of Hesse =

Landgrave of Hesse

Otto I
- Landgrave of Hesse
- Born: c. 1272; Marburg
- Died: 17 January 1328 (aged 55–56); Kassel
- Noble family: House of Hesse
- Spouse: Adelheid of Ravensberg
- Issue: Henry II the Iron; Otto, Archbishop of Magdeburg; Louis the Junker; Hermann I the Elder; Elisabeth
- Father: Henry I, Landgrave of Hesse
- Mother: Adelheid of Brunswick-Lüneburg

Otto I (c. 1272 – 17 January 1328) was Landgrave of Upper Hesse from 1308 and then Landgrave of Lower Hesse from 1311 until his death.

Otto was born in Marburg, a son of Henry I, Landgrave of Hesse and his first wife Adelheid of Brunswick-Lunenburg. Following the death of his father in 1308, he inherited Upper Hesse, the "Land on the Lahn", which included Marburg, Giessen, Grünberg and Alsfeld. After his half-brother John died in 1311, he also became landgrave of Lower Hesse. This included the area below the Fulda, Eder, Schwalm, Werra, and the upper reaches of the Weser, with the residence of Kassel, as well as the towns of Homberg (Efze), Melsungen, and Rotenburg an der Fulda.

After Otto inherited the whole Landgraviate, he resided alternately in Kassel and Marburg. Otto had a long conflict with the Archbishop of Mainz, Matthias von Bucheck. In 1324 Mainz won the battle in the Lahnberg with help from troops from Amöneburg. In 1327, Mainz adopted Giessen with the help of troops from the Electorate of Trier, but the citizens of the town quickly enabled Otto to regain control. Only after Otto's victory at Wetzlar and with the mediation of King John of Luxembourg in 1328 was conciliation made possible.

Otto died on 17 January 1328 in Kassel, and was buried in the Ahnaberg monastery.

== Family and children ==
He was married 1297 in Saint Elisabethkirche, Marburg to Adelheid of Ravensberg, daughter of Count Otto III of Ravensberg and had the following children:

1. Henry II the Iron (d. 3 June 1376, Kassel).
2. Otto (1301–1361, Wolmirstedt), Archbishop of Magdeburg.
3. Louis the Junker (d. 2 February 1345). Father of Hermann II of Hesse.
4. Herman I the Elder (d. 1368/70).
5. Elisabeth (d. 30 May 1373), married before 8 May 1336 to Duke Rudolf II of Saxony.

Otto I of Hesse House of Hesse Born: c. 1272 Died: 17 January 1328
Regnal titles
New creation	Landgrave of Upper Hesse; 1308–1328	Succeeded by Henry II as Landgrave of Hesse
Preceded by John	Landgrave of Lower Hesse; 1311–1328	Succeeded by Henry II as Landgrave of Hesse
