= Ernest I of Brunswick-Göttingen =

Ernest I, Duke of Brunswick-Göttingen
- Born: c. 1305
- Died: 24 April 1367
- Noble family: House of Guelf
- Spouse: Elizabeth of Hesse
- Issue: Otto I
- Father: Albert II, Duke of Brunswick-Lüneburg
- Mother: Rixa of Werle

Duke Ernest I of Brunswick-Göttingen (c. 1305 – 24 April 1367) was a member of the Guelph dynasty and was Duke of Brunswick-Göttingen from 1344 until his death.

== Life ==
Ernest was a son of Duke Albert II of Brunswick-Wolfenbüttel-Göttingen and his wife, Rixa of Werle. In the division of 1286, his father had received the Principality of Göttingen and in 1292, he inherited Principality of Brunswick-Wolfenbüttel from his childless brother William I. After his father's death in 1318, Ernest's older brother Otto the Mild took up government. After Otto died childless in 1344, Ernest and his older brother Magnus I divided the Duchy. Ernest received the Principality of Göttingen, which would remain separated from the rest of Brunswick for a while.

The principality of Göttingen, also known as the Upper Forest, was the poorest of the Welf principalities. It consisted at this time of the former County of Northeim, the cities of Göttingen, Uslar, Dransfeld, Munden and Gieselwerder and one half of Moringen. The city of Brunswick remained shared property of the various Dukes of Brunswick.

In 1339, Ernest married Elizabeth, a daughter of Landgrave Henry II "the Iron" of Hesse. With her, he had at least six children. The best known of these is his successor, Otto I. A younger son joined the clergy. Around the year 1364, Ernest handed some of the government business to his son Otto I. After Ernest's death in 1367, Otto I took over completely.

Not much is known about Ernest's rule, unlike his son's time in office. It is assumed that, like his predecessors, he fought alongside the cities in the area against the noble robber barons who held castles in the area. In his last years, he mostly lived in peace with his neighbours and had alliances with many of them. He was only at war with the Bishopric of Hildesheim and its allies, Mainz, Hesse, Waldeck and Hohnstein.

== See also ==
- House of Welf
- Duchy of Brunswick-Lüneburg

== Footnotes ==
Ernest I of Brunswick-Göttingen House of Guelph Born: c. 1305 Died: 24 April 1367
Preceded by Otto the Mild	Duke of Brunswick-Lüneburg; Prince of Göttingen; 1344–1367	Succeeded by Otto I
