= Sophia of Brandenburg =

German duchess (1300-1356)

Sophia of Brandenburg-Stendal
- Born: 1300
- Died: 1356 (aged 55–56)
- Noble family: House of Ascania; House of Welf by marriage
- Spouse: Magnus, Duke of Brunswick-Lüneburg (m. 1327)
- Issue: Magnus with the Necklace, Duke of Brunswick-Lüneburg; Louis; Albert of Brunswick and Lunenburg-Wolfenbüttel; Henry; Ernest; Matilda; Agnes; Sophie
- Father: Henry I, Margrave of Brandenburg-Stendal
- Mother: Agnes of Bavaria

Sophia of Brandenburg (1300–1356) was a daughter of Margrave Henry I (1256–1318) and his wife Agnes of Bavaria (1276–1345).

In 1327, she married Duke Magnus "the Pious" of Brunswick-Wolfenbüttel (1304–1369), Duke of Brunswick-Lüneburg. The following children reached adulthood:

- Magnus with the Necklace, Duke of Brunswick-Lüneburg (1324–1373), married Catherine, daughter of Bernhard III, Prince of Anhalt-Bernburg. They had more than ten children, some dukes of Brunswick-Lüneburg. Also Catherine Elisabeth of Brunswick-Lüneburg, grandmother of Christian I of Denmark.
- Louis (died 1367)
- Albert, Prince-Archbishop of Bremen (died 1395)
- Henry, Provost of Halberstadt Cathedral
- Ernest
- Matilda (d.a. 1354), married Bernhard III, Prince of Anhalt-Bernburg (d. 1348). They had two known children:
  - Otto III, Prince of Anhalt-Bernburg
  - Gertrude, married to Günther XII, Count of Schwarzburg.
- Agnes (1343–1404), married in c. 1360 to Count Heinrich/Henry of Hohnstein (de) (d. 1408). They had about six children, two counts of Hohnstein.
- Sophie (c. 1340 – c. 1394), married in c. 1360 to Count Dietrich V of Hohnstein (c. 1306 – 1379), cousin of Heinrich, sharing their county and lordships. She was Dietrich's second (possibly third) wife. The pair had one daughter:
  - Agnes (1360–1404), married 1377 to Christian V, Count of Oldenburg-Welsburg (c. 1342 – a. 1399). One of their sons, Dietrich, Count of Oldenburg, was father of Christian I of Denmark, Norway and Sweden, an ancestor of many Danish kings and other royals persons through the 21st Century.

== Sources ==
- Horst-Rüdiger Jarck, Gerhard Schildt, Braunschweigische Landesgeschichte. Jahrtausendrückblick einer Region, Braunschweig 2000, ISBN 3-930292-28-9
- Horst-Rüdiger Jarck, Braunschweigisches Biographisches Lexikon. 8-18. Jahrhundert, Braunschweig 2006, S.
