= Przemko of Ścinawa =

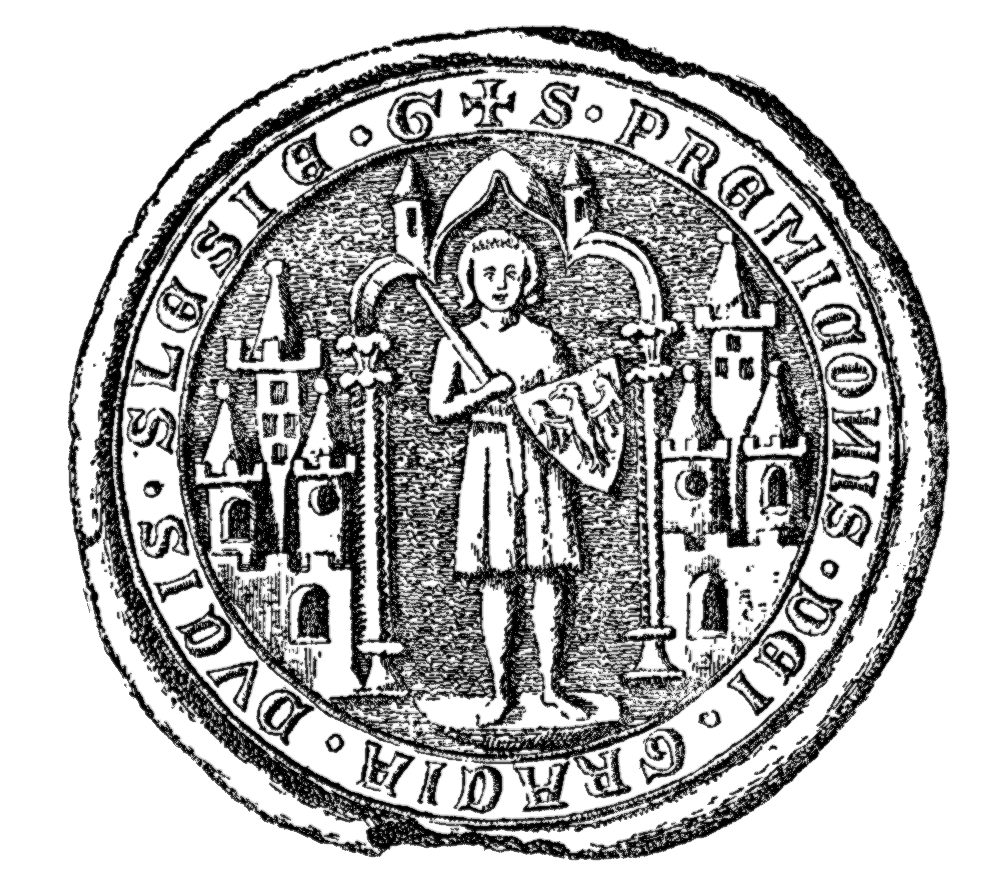
Przemko's seal, dated to 1284

Przemko of Ścinawa (Polish: Przemko ścinawski; 1255/65 – 26 February 1289) was Duke of Żagań from 1278 to 1284 and Duke of Ścinawa from 1284 until his death.

He was the third and youngest son of Konrad I, Duke of Głogów by his first wife Salome, daughter of Duke Władysław of Greater Poland.

== Life ==
=== Duke of Żagań and later of Ścinawa ===
After his father's death in 1274, Przemko was placed under the care of his older brother Henry III. Only in 1278 he received the Duchy of Żagań (which included Żagań, Szprotawa and Nowogród Bobrzański) as an independent ruler. By 1281 he paid homage to Henry IV Probus, Duke of Wrocław.

As a result of pressures from Henry IV Probus, in 1284, Przemko and his brother Konrad II the Hunchback, Duke of Ścinawa, exchanged their lands: Przemko assumed rule over Ścinawa and Konrad II took Żagań. This was maybe because Henry IV preferred in the borders of his domains the most trustful Przemko, who, like his brother Henry III, was a faithful follower of Henry IV's politics, supporting him in all his major projects, including in the conflict with the Bishop Thomas II of Wrocław. When Henry IV Probus took control over Kraków after the death of Leszek II the Black in 1288, he could count on the support of the Duke of Ścinawa.

=== Death ===
Przemko died during the Battle of Siewierz between Henry IV Probus and the coalition formed by Duke Bolesław II of Płock and Duke Władysław I the Elbow-high of Kuyavia. According to the Chronicle of Jan Długosz, the exact date of the battle was 26 February 1290; however, 26 February 1289 seems a more likely date, and is given by other sources.

His death had a very vivid description, thanks to the Nagrobków książąt śląskich and the Kroniki książąt polskich. According to these sources, he was taken prisoner among other Silesian Dukes, but during the subsequent confusion after the defeat, he was murdered in the battlefield.

The key to the interpretation of both sources, could be found in the Duke's grave in the Cisternian monastery of Lubiąż, who was possibly the main cause of the description of Przemko's dramatic end. The hatred of the Dukes of Głogów against Władysław I the Elbow-high, developed in the second half of the 13th century and the beginning of the 14th century, was possibly the true cause of this description. Moreover, as support of this theory was that Duke Bolko I of Opole, who also captured in the same battle, was treated differently. The Dukes of Głogów were closely linked with the Monastery of Lubiąż. It is there were the Duke of Ścinawa was buried; also, just before to his departure to the battle, he ordered two of his villages: Łososzkowice (now Łososiowice) and Żyrków (now Żerków), to provide storage and support to the Cistercians.

In the next years after the death of Przemko in Siewierz was established in Lubiąż an excellent epitaph work; Przemko's grave, whose inscription was "Among everything to God and the Nature gave to the Polish, the best was without doubt the prince Przemko" (Wszystko, co Bóg i natura dały Polakom najlepszego, najwznioślejszego, było udziałem księcia Przemka) certainly influenced the imagination of the near inhabitants. The Duke of Ścinawa probably died during the battle, in unclear circumstances. It is doubtful that Władysław I the Elbow-high and Bolesław II of Płock, or any knight, could murder Przemko in cold blood. Another interesting fact was, if Przemko was captured and murdered immediately, his direct relatives never revenged his death. Henry III's politics with Władysław I never exposed an open hostility, which characterize the Duke of Głogów's relations with Henry V the Fat.

Przemko never married or had children; according to the Feudal Law, Ścinawa was annexed by Henry IV Probus to his domains, as part of his projected unification of Poland.

== Establishment of the Magdeburg Law by Przemko ==
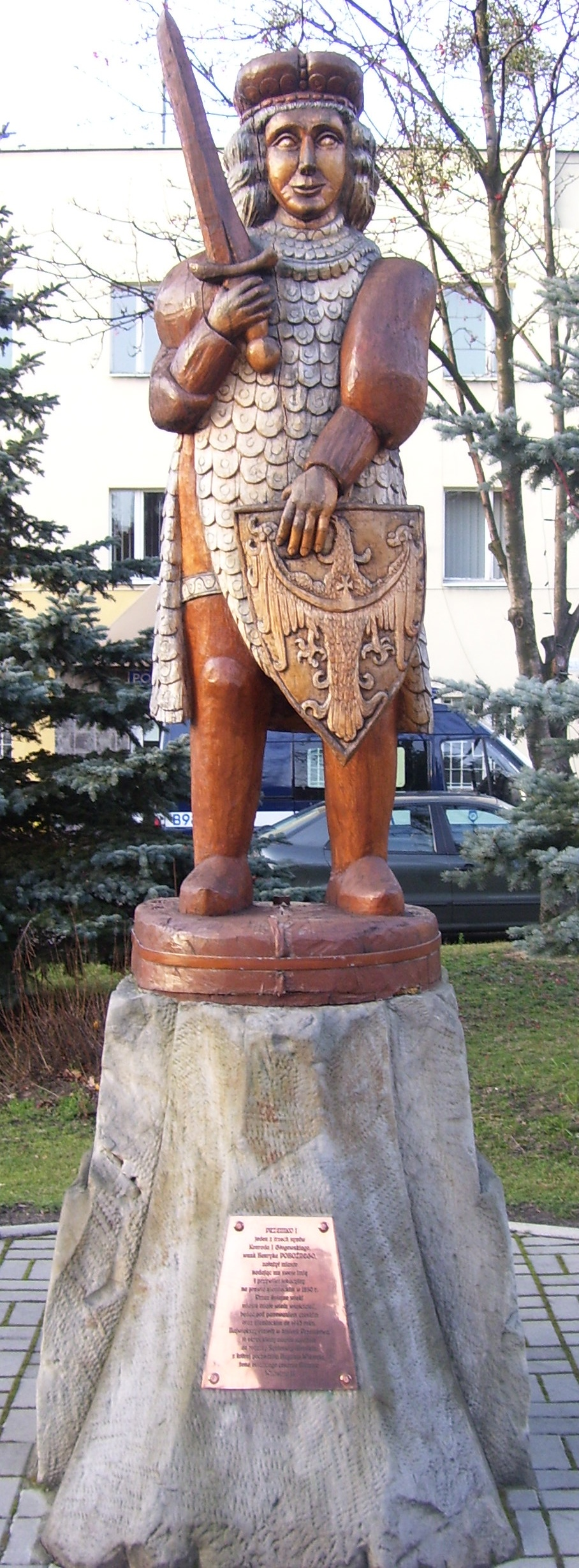
Przemko's monument in Przemków

During his reign, Przemko granted the Magdeburg Law to five Silesian towns: Żagań, Lubin, Przemków, Wołów and Wińsko.

=== Żagań ===
The first historical mention of Żagań was around 1202. The town was placed on the Magdeburg Law by Przemko in 1280. The document is not preserved today (one charter found later was considered now a forgery). Żagań gained fame as the capital of the Duchies of Żagań and Żagań-Głogów. Later, after the death of Henry III in 1309 and the subsequent division of his domains, Żagań was inherited by his oldest son, Henry IV the Faithful, who became in the ancestor of the Żagań-Głogów branch, which ended in 1504.

=== Lubin ===
The exact foundation of Lubin and his early history is not entirely known, but previous studies assumed the city existed already in 1170, but was formally founded by 1202. The district was part of the Duchy of Głogów, and after 1273 passed to the Duchy of Ścinawa, shortly after under the rule of Przemko, who granted Lubin with the Magdeburg Law in 1288.

=== Przemków ===
It is uncertain whether the city was founded with his actual name or another. It is known, however, that Przemko made the district a center of exchange and trading with its near neighbors. The document of the foundation is not preserved, but German historians report that it was issued on 8 July 1280.

=== Wołów ===
Unfortunately, the documents about its foundation are missing, but sources indicate that Wołów was founded in 1285; however, more specific details or even the date of the formal foundation are unknown. Is likely assumed that Wołów was provided by Przemko as a strong advocate for the pursuit of Silesia intensive investment shares. The investment income earned to the Duke so much experience, used by him in subsequent locations, including Wołów. Thanks to the disappeared foundation documents, the system used by the city is uncertain.

=== Wińsko ===
In a document confirming the possessions of Lubiąż monastery in 1217 existed a record of "Wroblino juxta vin", which, by some scholars, is regarded as the earliest mention of Wińsko. However, the first reliable historical notice about this district, was in a document issued in 1280, which was listed in the local church pastor Nicolaus. In 1285, Wińsko was placed under the Magdeburg Law by Przemko.

Preceded by new creation	Duke of Żagań; 1278–1284	Succeeded by Konrad II the Hunchback
Preceded by Konrad II the Hunchback	Duke of Ścinawa; 1284–1289	Succeeded by Henry IV Probus
