= William I of Brunswick-Lüneburg =

William (c. 1270 – 30 September 1292, in Brunswick), Duke of Brunswick-Lüneburg, briefly ruled part of the duchy.

William was the third son of Albert I, Duke of Brunswick-Lüneburg. On Albert's death on 1279, the three eldest brothers succeeded him, but were put under guardianship of Conrad, Prince-Bishop of Verden. After they reached majority, they divided the territory among each other in 1291: William received the northern part of their father's state, including Brunswick, Schöningen, the Harzburg, Seesen, and Königslutter. The brothers disagreed over control of the City of Brunswick.

Only a year later, William died, and his brothers divided his territory among each other. He had married Elizabeth, daughter of Henry I, Landgrave of Hesse, but the marriage apparently remained childless.

Preceded by Albert I	Duke of Brunswick-Lüneburg, Prince of Brunswick; 1279–1292, until 1291 jointly with Henry I and Albert II	Succeeded by Henry I and Albert II
