= Matilda of Habsburg =

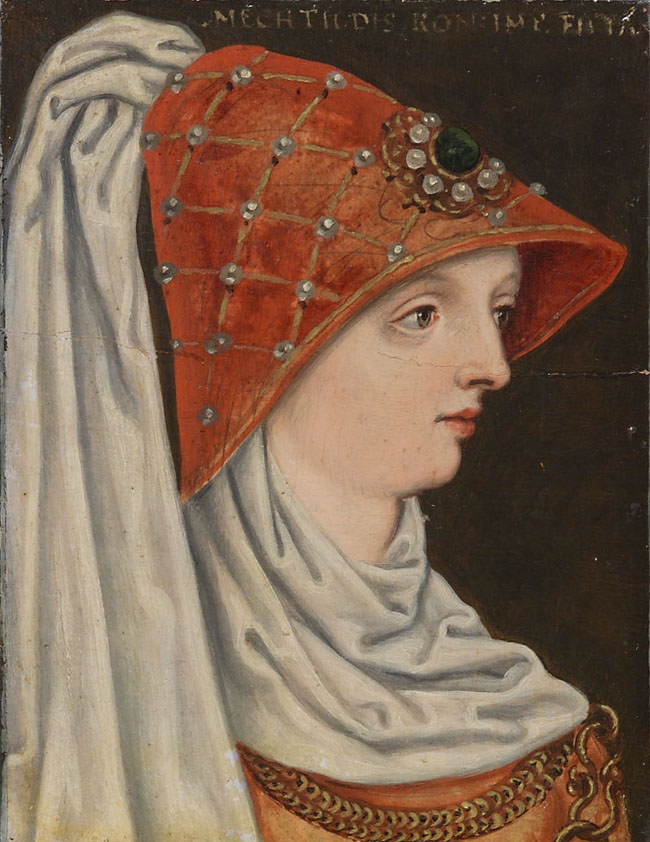
- Portrait by Anton Boys

Duchess consort of Bavaria
- Tenure: 1273–1294
- Born: 1253; Rheinfelden
- Died: 23 December 1304; Munich, Bavaria
- Spouse: Louis II, Duke of Bavaria (m. 1273; died 1294)
- Issue: Rudolf I, Duke of Bavaria; Agnes, Margravine of Brandenburg; Louis IV, Holy Roman Emperor
- House: Habsburg (by birth); Wittelsbach (by marriage)
- Father: Rudolf I of Germany
- Mother: Gertrude of Hohenberg

Matilda of Habsburg or Melchilde (1253 – 23 December 1304) was a duchess consort of Bavaria. She was regent of Upper Bavaria during the minority of her younger son, Louis IV in 1294–1301.

== Marriage ==
Matilda was the eldest daughter of Rudolf I of Germany and Gertrude of Hohenberg. She became the third wife of Louis II, Duke of Bavaria, on 24 October 1273 in Aachen. Matilda and Louis had the following children:

- Rudolf I (4 October 1274, Basel – 12 August 1319).
- Mechthild (1275 – 28 March 1319, Lüneburg), married 1288 to Duke Otto II of Brunswick-Lüneburg.
- Agnes (d. 1345); married firstly, in 1290 in Donauwörth, Henry the Younger of Hesse. Married secondly, in 1298/1303, Henry I, Margrave of Brandenburg-Stendal.
- Louis IV (1 April 1282, Munich – 11 October 1347 in Puch, near Fürstenfeldbruck).

== Regency ==
On her husband's death in 1294, Matilda acted as regent for her younger son Louis. A decision was made for Matilda to take part of the duchy with her younger son Louis, for whom she became regent, and her elder son Rudolf (who was an adult) to take the other part. Matilda took a large part of Upper Bavaria while Rudolf took the cities such as: Ingolstadt, Langenfeld and Rietberg. Within a couple of years her son came of age and ruled the duchy by himself.

Though Matilda had her younger son, Louis partly educated in Vienna and became co-regent of his brother Rudolf I in Upper Bavaria in 1301 with the support of Matilda and her brother King Albert I, he quarreled with the Habsburgs from 1307 over possessions in Lower Bavaria. A civil war against his brother Rudolf due to new disputes on the partition of their lands was ended in 1313, when peace was made at Munich.

Matilda and Rudolf continued to be at odds and in 1302 Matilda was arrested by Rudolf and brought to Munich, where she signed an agreement promising never to interfere in the government again, but as soon as she was outside the borders of Bavaria, Matilda declared the agreement null and void, and got the support of her brother, Albert, Louis the Bavarian and others.

Matilda's son, Louis, defeated his Habsburg cousin Frederick the Fair. Originally, he was a friend of Frederick, with whom he had been raised. However, armed conflict arose when the tutelage over the young Dukes of Lower Bavaria (Henry XIV, Otto IV and Henry XV) was entrusted to Frederick. On 9 November 1313, Frederick was beaten by Louis in the Battle of Gammelsdorf and had to renounce the tutelage.

Matilda died on 23 December 1304 at Munich, Bavaria.
