= Albert II (bishop of Halberstadt) =

Prince-Bishop of Halberstadt

Albert II of Brunswick-Lüneburg
- Prince-Bishop of Halberstadt
- Born: c. 1294
- Died: 1358
- Buried: Brunswick Cathedral
- Noble family: House of Welf
- Father: Albert II, Duke of Brunswick-Lüneburg
- Mother: Rixa of Werle

Albert II of Brunswick-Lüneburg (c. 1294–1358), a member of the House of Welf, was Prince-Bishop of Halberstadt from 1325 until his death. His regnal numbers indicate that he was the second Bishop Albert of Halberstadt. His reign can be characterized as an almost unbroken series of conflicts with the Pope, his cathedral chapter, the city of Halberstadt and various neighbouring Lords and Princes.

== Life ==
Albert was a younger son of Duke Albert II of Brunswick-Lüneburg (d. 1318) and his wife, Rixa of Werle (d. 1317). While his eldest brother Otto succeeded their father as Duke, Albert joined the clergy at an early age and in 1319, he was already canon in Halberstadt. Soon afterwards, he was appointed provost of the St. Alexander minster in Einbeck.

When Bishop Albert I of Halberstadt died on 14 September 1324, the cathedral chapter, on 6 October 1324, wrote a list of concessions his successor would have to agree to. The list included provisions on the jurisdiction of the archdeacon and episcopal officials, about real estate held by the cathedral provost and mortgaging the chapter's real estate. In the subsequent election, the largest number of votes was cast for Louis of Steindorf; Albert of Brunswick received only five votes. However, Archbishop Matthias of Mainz, who was the metropolitan bishop, opted for Albert II. Pope John XXII ignored the rights of the cathedral chapter and appointed Giseko of Holstein, who never came into actual possession of the bishopric, but continued to raise claims on it.

During the interregnum between the death of Albert I and the confirmation of Albert II, the cathedral chapter had a conflict with the Principality of Anhalt about the Aschersleben territory and, almost simultaneously, a feud broke out between the chapter and the Regenstein counts Albert II and Bernard, who were the patrons of the city of Quedlinburg. Bishop Albert II captured Gunteken Castle, close to Quedlinburg, around Easter 1325, and as a result, the Halberstadt chapter became the new patrons of Quedlinburg on 14 April 1326.

After Albert had fought a more prominent feud against the Margraviate of Meissen, the old conflict against the comital House of Regenstein broke out again. Albert accused the counts of various acts of violence and interference with his right and of converting churches into fortified buildings. The parties agreed to have the conflict arbitrated by Albert's brother, Duke Otto of Brunswick. However, after the duke gave his verdict, the counts disagreed, took up arms and damaged Quedlinburg Abbey and City. The struggle did not go well for the counts and they had to make several concessions to their opponents before Albert II was distracted by yet another conflict.

After some machinations by cathedral dean Jacob Snelhard, the cathedral chapter closed an alliance with the three collegiate convents in town to protect their freedoms and privileges against all interventions. This alliance was primarily directed against Bishop Albert II. Albert's brother, Duke Otto of Brunswick, mediated and on 17 July 1336, a compromise was reached. Peace, however, did not last very long. Snelhard incited the citizens of Halberstadt against their bishop and they complained to his metropolitan, the Archbishop of Mainz, who sent master Albert of Gotha to investigate the complaints. After the investigation, the delegation from Mainz ruled against Snelhard and relieved him of his post.

Although Albert II had excommunicated members of the collegiate chapter, they continued to exercise their clerical tasks. Albert II ordered that Halberstadt Cathedral and the Church of Our Lady be closed. A lower member of the clergy, who came to read Mass, was denied entrance. An insurgence broke out in the city. Delegates sent by the bishop were killed and Albert had to flee. The situation calmed down in 1338. Albert lifted the ex-communications and the written agreements between the citizens and the cathedral chapter were handed over and destroyed in the presence of a large number of prelates and knights. Albert returned and solemnly entered the city, accompanied by his Welf brothers and cousins as well as other spiritual and temporal leaders, and the citizens paid him homage again.

In 1340, the feud between the Halberstadt convent and the Princes of Anhalt broke out again. The parties chose the Magdeburg archbishop, Otto of Hesse, as an arbitrator. He acknowledged that the Ascanian princes were entitled to Aschersleben and Emperor Louis IV enfeoffed Prince Bernhard III of Anhalt-Bernburg with the principality. Nevertheless, the Halberstadt convent retained possession of the Aschersleben estates.

Another bloody feud arose after Giseko of Holstein died and the Pope appointed Count Albert of Mansfeld as the new Bishop of Halberstadt. In his struggle against Albert of Mansfeld, Albert II was supported by his brothers and by the cities of Brunswick, Halberstadt, Quedlinburg and Aschersleben.

In the 1350s, there were further struggles with the pope. Pope Innocent VI tried every means available to dislodge Albert from his see. After Albert of Mansfeld died, the pope excommunicated Albert II and appointed the Wettin scion Louis of Meissen as his successor. Albert II resigned so that Louis could actually succeed him. On 13 May 1358, Albert sealed his resignation deed.

He seems to have died later that year and was buried in Brunswick Cathedral.

Albert II (bishop of Halberstadt) House of Welf Born: c. 1294 Died: 1358
Preceded by Albert I of Anhalt	Prince-Bishop of Halberstadt; 1325-1358	Succeeded by Louis of Meissen
