= Konrad II the Hunchback =

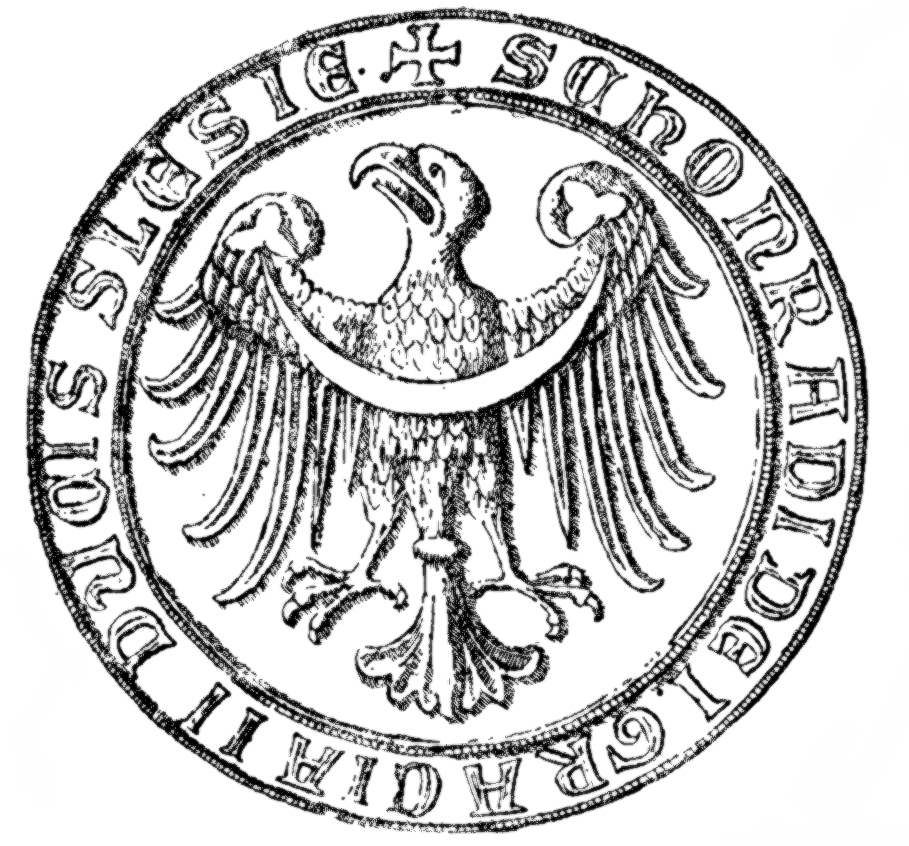
- Seal of Konrad II from 1283
- Native name: Konrad II Garbaty
- Born: 1252/65
- Died: 11 October 1304
- Noble family: House of Piast
- Father: Konrad I, Duke of Głogów
- Mother: Salome of Greater Poland

Konrad II the Hunchback (Polish: Konrad II Garbaty) (1252/65 – 11 October 1304) was Duke of Ścinawa from 1278 to 1284, patriarch of Aquileia in 1299, and Duke of Żagań from 1284 until his death.

== Biography ==
He was the second son of Konrad I, Duke of Głogów by his first wife Salome, daughter of Duke Władysław of Greater Poland. His nickname "Hunchback" (Garbaty) appears in contemporary chronicles probably due to his religious career.

Konrad II first appeared on the chronicles at the ceremony of the canonization of his paternal great-grandmother Hedwig of Andechs in 1267. Ten years later he joined his elder brother Henry III in the Battle of Stolec (24 April 1277) which culminated in a disastrous defeat.

Shortly after these events, Konrad was sent to Bologna, Italy to study in order to take important ecclesiastical posts in the future. During his absence, Henry IV Probus ruled Ścinawa on his behalf. When Konrad II returned to his Duchy in 1280, the Duke of Wrocław refused to return control. It was not until years later when thanks to pressure from Bishop Thomas II Zaremba of Wrocław Henry IV finally recognized the sovereignty of Konrad II over Ścinawa.

Four years after Konrad I's death in 1278, the Duchy was divided between Konrad II and his brothers., with the former obtaining Ścinawa. However, in 1284, Konrad II assumed the rule over Żagań, while his younger brother Przemko, then Duke of Żagań, received Ścinawa. One possible reason for this switch was pressure from Duke Henry IV Probus of Wrocław, who preferred to have the more trustful Przemko in the neighboring realm.

After returning to Silesia, Konrad II obtained his first church position. In 1281 he was appointed Provost of Lubusz, and in 1287, with the help of Bishop Thomas II, he became in Provost of Wrocław. In 1292 he was one of the candidates for the Bishopric of Wrocław, but because of resistance from the Chapter, the choice fell on Jan Romka.

The relations of Konrad II with his brother Henry III were ambiguous. Initially, there were no frictions. Konrad II supported his brother in his aim to recover Ścinawa after the death of Przemko in the Battle of Siewierz (1289), but ultimately the land was annexed by Henry IV Probus; also, he supported Henry III in his talks with Przemysł II of Greater Poland and in his subsequent wars against Henry V the Fat. Their good relations were broken in 1296, when Konrad II, after knowing of the involvement of Henry III in Great Poland affairs, joined the military expedition against him led by Bolko I the Strict; however, Bolko I made an agreement with Henry III in Zwanowicach, by which was compelled to give up the towns of Lubin and Wińsko to Konrad II.

On 5 March 1299, Konrad II received a great opportunity to be raised in his church career. Thanks to the intercession of his brother-in-law, Count Albert I of Gorizia, he was chosen as the new patriarch/lord of Aquileia. However, the Duke of Żagań never reached his new lands in Friuli; after having been stopped in the middle of the road in Vienna due to the lack of approval from pope Boniface VIII, he returned to his country.

Back to Żagań, Konrad II claimed the effective government of his lands, which had been taken by Henry III during his absence. The Duke of Głogów refused to give up the rule and decided to jail his brother. However, the knighthood of Żagań, Bolko I the Strict, and Bishop of Wrocław - who even declared the excommunication of Henry III and the interdict over Głogów - intervened in his favour. Finally, Konrad II regained his freedom and the government of his Duchy, but the relationship between the brothers remained very strained until Konrad II's death.

Konrad II died on 11 October 1304 and was buried in the Cistercian monastery in Lubiąż. Żagań was thenceforth acquired by Henry III.

== Sources ==
- Marek, Miroslav. "Complete Genealogy of the House of Piast: Głogów". Genealogy.EU.

Konrad II the Hunchback House of Piast Born: c. 1252-1265 Died: 11 October 1304
Preceded by new creation	Duke of Ścinawa; 1278–1284	Succeeded by Przemko
Preceded by Przemko	Duke of Żagań; 1284–1304	Succeeded by Henry III
Catholic Church titles
Preceded by Raimondo della Torre	Patriarch of Aquileia; 1299	Succeeded by Pietro Gerra
