= Henry I of Brandenburg =

Margrave of Brandenburg (died 1318)

Henry I, Margrave of Brandenburg-Stendal
- Born: 21 March 1256
- Died: 14 February 1318 (aged 61)
- Noble family: House of Ascania
- Spouse: Agnes of Bavaria
- Issue Detail: Henry II, Margrave of Brandenburg-Stendal; Sophia of Brandenburg
- Father: John I, Margrave of Brandenburg
- Mother: Jutta of Saxony

Margrave Henry I (nicknamed Henry Lackland; 21 March 1256 – 14 February 1318) was a member of the House of Ascania and Margrave of Brandenburg-Stendal and Landsberg.

== Life ==
Henry was a son of Margrave John I of Brandenburg and his second wife, Jutta, the daughter of Duke Albert I of Saxony. The origin of his nickname "Lackland" is not known. Henry was more than fifteen years younger than his brothers John II, Otto IV "with the arrow" and Conrad I and was therefore likely to be excluded from governing when his brothers inherited the Margraviate.

It was not until 1294 he began to participate in the government of the country. When he did, he received — according to an excerpt from the Bohemian chronicler Přibík Pulkava — Delitzsch as his seat. Delitzsch was located in the Margraviate of Landsberg, which Margrave Albert II of Meissen had sold to the Margraves of Brandenburg. From then on, Henry used the title of Margrave of Landsberg in addition to Margrave of Brandenburg in almost all documents. As Margrave of Landsberg, he fought several feuds with neighbouring princes. He was excommunicated by archbishop Burchard II of Magdeburg.

In 1311, Henry lost a feud to Duke Rudolf I of Saxony and had to hand over the County Palatine of Saxony with the castles Grillenberg Castle in Sangerhausen and Raspenburg Castle in Rastenberg to Rudolf I. He also lost a feud to Margrave Dietrich IV of Lusatia.

After Emperor Henry VII, Henry's nephew Margrave Waldemar proposed to elect Henry I as King of the Romans. Henry I appears to have declined the proposal, and his promised by deed to vote for Duke Frederick the Fair or his brother Leopold I. However, in the end, Henry voted for Duke Louis IV of Bavaria.

Henry died on 14 February 1318 at the age of 61 years.

== Marriage and issue ==
Henry was married to Agnes, the daughter of Duke Louis II "the Strict" of Bavaria and widow of Landgrave Henry the Younger of Hesse. Henry and Agnes had three children:

- Henry II, Margrave of Brandenburg
- Sophia (1300-1356), married Duke Magnus I of Brunswick-Wolfenbüttel
- Judith (c. 1302-c. 1330), married in 1318 to Duke Henry II of Brunswick-Grubenhagen
