= Otto the Mild =

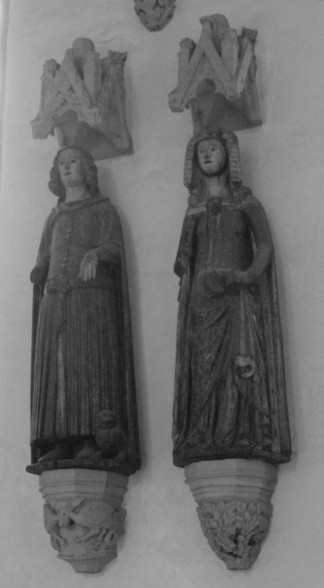
Otto the Mild and his wife Agnes of Brandenburg.

Otto the Mild (24 June 1292 – 30 August 1344), Duke of Brunswick-Lüneburg, ruled over the Brunswick part of the duchy.

Otto was the eldest son of Albert II, Duke of Brunswick-Lüneburg. Otto and his brothers succeeded on their father's death in 1318; he served as his brothers' guardian while they were not of age. In 1323, he acquired the Altmark from Brandenburg as an inheritance of his wife's; but he sold it in 1343, when he failed to establish control there.

Otto died in 1344 in Göttingen and was succeeded by his brothers.

== Family ==
Firstly, Otto married Jutta (died 1317), daughter of Henry I, Landgrave of Hesse. Secondly, he married Agnes (1297–1334), daughter of Herman, Margrave of Brandenburg-Salzwedel, in 1319. From the first marriage, he had one daughter: Agnes (died 1371).

Otto the Mild House of Welf Born: 24 June 1292 Died: 30 August 1344
Preceded by Albert II	Duke of Brunswick-Lüneburg, Prince of Brunswick; 1318–1344	Succeeded by Magnus I and Ernest I
