= Magnus I of Brunswick-Lüneburg =

14th-century German nobleman

Magnus I
- Duke of Brunswick-Lüneburg
- Born: 1304
- Died: 1369 (aged 64–65)
- Noble family: House of Guelph
- Spouse: Sophia of Brandenburg-Stendal
- Issue: Magnus II; Louis; Albert; Henry
- Father: Albert II, Duke of Brunswick-Lüneburg
- Mother: Rixa of Werle

Magnus I (1304-1369), called the Pious (Latin Pius), was a notable German noble from the House of Welf, a powerful dynasty in medieval Germany. He was the ruler of the Principality of Brunswick-Wolfenbüttel, a part of the larger Duchy of Brunswick-Lüneburg. Magnus was a key figure in the Welf dynasty’s efforts to consolidate their territorial holdings during a time of political fragmentation in the Holy Roman Empire.

The son of Albert the Fat, Duke of Brunswick-Lüneburg, Magnus was still a minor when his father died in 1318; he and his brother Ernest were put under the guardianship of their elder brother Otto, who continued as sole ruler even after his brothers came of age. After marrying Sophia, a niece of Louis IV, Holy Roman Emperor, Magnus was appointed margrave of Landsberg and count palatine of Saxony by the Emperor in 1333. Magnus took residence at Sangerhausen. When Otto died in 1344, Magnus and Ernest jointly took over government of the state; but already on 17 April 1345, they agreed to divide the territory. Magnus received the Principality of Wolfenbüttel.

In 1346, a border war between Wolfenbüttel and the Archbishop of Magdeburg broke out. In exchange for help in this conflict, Magnus sold the Margraviate of Landsberg to Frederick II, Margrave of Meißen. But the Archbishop conquered Schöningen in 1347, and Magnus had to cede Hötensleben and some other possessions to the Archbishop. Financially ruined by the war, Magnus could not stop the cities in the state from acquiring more and more rights; especially the City of Brunswick was becoming more powerful.

In 1348, the Emperor gave Landsberg and the Palatinate of Saxony to Bernard, Prince of Anhalt. The ensuing conflict over these territories between Magnus and Bernard ended amicably with a marriage between Magnus' son Magnus and Catherine, daughter of Bernhard III, Prince of Anhalt-Bernburg.

Magnus attempted to secure the Principality of Lüneburg for his son Louis, so that it could be reunited with Wolfenbüttel. The prince of Lüneburg, William II, Duke of Brunswick-Lüneburg, a member of the same house to which Magnus belonged, the House of Welf, did not have sons; however, he had already promised the principality to a son of his daughter, a relative of the Duke of Saxony, before he agreed to Magnus' plan. Louis then married William's daughter Matilda. A lengthy conflict broke out that culminated in the Lüneburg Succession War, which was resolved only in 1388.

In 1367, Magnus joined Dietrich, Archbishop of Magdeburg, Albert, Bishop of Halberstadt, Valdemar, Prince of Anhalt, and others in a campaign against Gerhard of Berg, Bishop of Hildesheim; they were defeated by Hildesheim in a battle near Farmsen and Dinklar on 3 September.(de:Schlacht von Dinklar) Magnus was taken prisoner, and had to buy his freedom. He died in summer of 1369.

== Family ==
Around 1327, Magnus married Sophia (died 1356), the daughter of Henry I, Margrave of Brandenburg-Stendal. They had the following children that reached adulthood:

- Magnus (died 1373)
- Louis (died 1367), married Matilda, daughter of William II, Duke of Brunswick-Lüneburg
- Albert, Prince-Archbishop of Bremen (died 1395)
- Henry, Provost of Halberstadt Cathedral
- Ernest
- Matilda, married Bernhard III, Prince of Anhalt-Bernburg
- Agnes, married in 1360 to Count Henry of Hohnstein
- Sophie, married Count Dietrich V of Hohnstein

Magnus I of Brunswick-Lüneburg House of Welf Cadet branch of the House of Este Born: 1304 Died: 1369
Regnal titles
Preceded by Otto the Mild	Duke of Brunswick-Lüneburg; Prince of Brunswick-Wolfenbüttel; 1344–1369	Succeeded by Magnus Torquatus
