= Lower Hesse =

Region of Germany

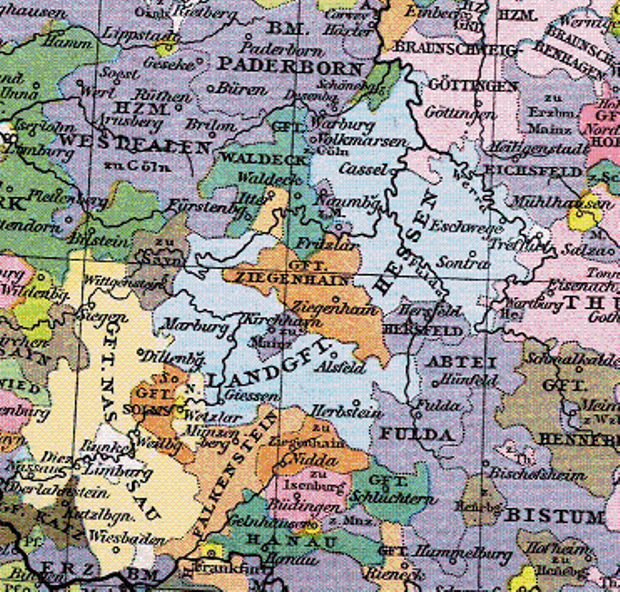
Upper and Lower Hesse (blue), about 1400

Lower Hesse is a historic designation for an area in northern Hesse, Germany.

The term Lower Hesse originated in the Middle Ages for the so-called "lower principality" of Hesse, which was separated until 1450 from the so-called "upper principality" (later Upper Hesse) by the comital lands of Ziegenhain. Lower Hesse was traversed by the Rhine and the Maine. It covered the area at the lower part of the Fulda and Eder rivers, and the Schwalm, Werra and Upper Weser rivers, including the towns of Kassel, Homberg (Efze), Melsungen, and Rotenburg an der Fulda.

Following the death in 1567 of Landgrave Philip the Magnanimous, Hesse was divided up among his four sons, with Lower Hesse becoming the heart of the new Landgraviate of Hesse-Kassel, which went to his son William IV.

== See also ==
- Kassel (region)
