= Albert II, Duke of Brunswick =

Duke of Brunswick-Lüneburg

Albert II
- Duke of Brunswick-Lüneburg
- Born: c. 1268
- Died: 22 September 1318
- Noble family: House of Guelph
- Spouse: Rixa of Werle
- Issue: Richenza, Abbess of Gandersheim; Mechtild; Jutta; Otto the Mild; Luder; Albert; Henry; Magnus I Ernest I
- Father: Albert I, Duke of Brunswick-Lüneburg
- Mother: Adelheid of Montferrat

Albert (Latin Albertus; c. 1268 – 22 September 1318), called the Fat (pinguis), was a member of the House of Welf, one of the oldest European noble families. He was born around 1268 and died on September 22, 1318. Albert II was the son of Albert I, Duke of Brunswick-Lüneburg, and Adelheid of Montferrat.

The second son of Albert the Tall, Duke of Brunswick-Lüneburg, Albert was a boy when his father died in 1279. He was first under guardianship of his uncle, Conrad, Prince-Bishop of Verden, and then of his elder brother, Henry I, Duke of Brunswick-Lüneburg. In 1286 the three brothers divided their father's Principality of Wolfenbüttel; Albert received the areas around Göttingen, Minden, Northeim, Calenberg, and Hanover. He made Göttingen his residence, thus Principality of Göttingen. In 1292, the third brother, William, died childless, and Albert and Henry, who had received the Principality of Grubenhagen, quarrelled about William's share, the remaining belittled areas around Brunswick and Wolfenbüttel; Albert finally prevailed.

== Family ==
On 10 January 1284 Albert married Rixa, daughter of Henry I, Prince of Werle and Mecklenburg-Güstrow, and Rikissa Birgersdotter. They had four daughters and nine sons. Three of the sons, Bruno, Wilhelm and Johann, died young.

The children who reached adulthood were:

- Adelaide (1290–1311), married John, Landgrave of Lower Hesse
- Richenza, Abbess of Gandersheim (1298 – 26 April 1317)
- Mechtild (1293 – 1 June 1356)
- Jutta (1309–1332)
- Otto the Mild, Prince of Wolfenbüttel (24 June 1292 – 30 August 1344)
- Luder or Lothar, joined the Teutonic Order
- Albert, Bishop of Halberstadt (died 1358)
- Henry, Bishop of Hildesheim (died 1362)
- Magnus I, Prince of Wolfenbüttel (died 1369)
- Ernest I, Prince of Gettingen (died 1367)

Albert II, Duke of Brunswick House of Welf Cadet branch of the House of Este Born: August 1267 Died: 7 September 1322
German nobility
Preceded by Albert I	Duke of Brunswick-Lüneburg; 1279–1291 with Henry I William I	Succeeded by Otto the Mild
New title	Prince of Göttingen; 1286–1318	Succeeded by Otto the Mild
Preceded by William I	Prince of Wolfenbüttel; 1292–1318	Succeeded by Otto the Mild
