= Louis II, Duke of Bavaria =

Duke of Upper Bavaria (1229–1294)

Louis II
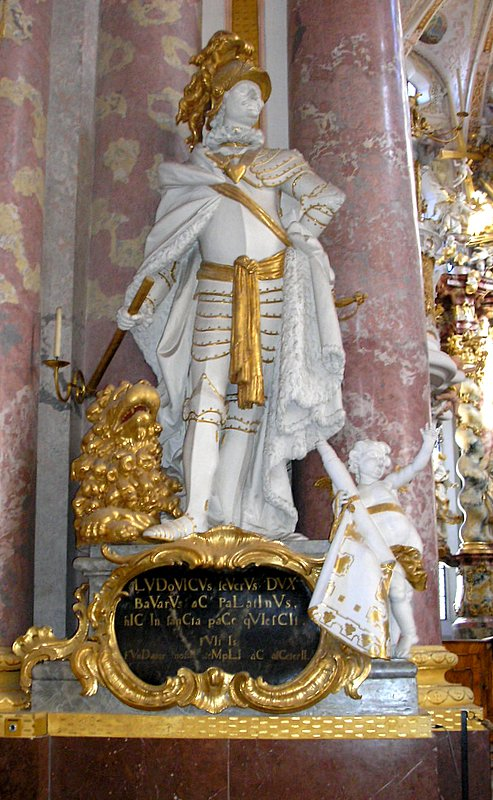

Duke of Upper Bavaria Count Palatine of the Rhine
- Reign: 29 November 1253 – 2 February 1294
- Predecessor: Otto II
- Successor: Rudolf I
- Born: 13 April 1229; Heidelberg
- Died: 2 February 1294 (aged 64); Heidelberg
- Spouse: Maria of Brabant (m. 1254; executed 1256) Anna of Glogau (m. 1260; died 1271) Matilda of Habsburg (m. 1273)
- Issue Detail: Maria of Bavaria; Ludwig of Bavaria; Rudolf I, Duke of Bavaria; Matilda, Duchess of Brunswick-Lüneburg; Agnes, Margravine of Brandenburg-Stendal; Anna of Bavaria; Louis IV, Holy Roman Emperor
- House: Wittelsbach
- Father: Otto II Wittelsbach, Duke of Bavaria
- Mother: Agnes of the Palatinate

Louis the Strict (German: Ludwig der Strenge) (13 April 1229 – 2 February 1294) was Duke of Upper Bavaria and Count Palatine of the Rhine from 1253. He is known as Louis II or Louis VI following an alternative numbering. Born in Heidelberg, he was a son of Otto II Wittelsbach, Duke of Bavaria and Agnes of the Palatinate.

== Biography ==
In 1246, the young Louis supported his brother-in-law King Conrad IV of Germany against the usurpation of Heinrich Raspe. In 1251, Louis was at war again against the bishop of Regensburg.

Louis succeeded his father Otto as Duke of Bavaria in 1253. When the Wittelsbach country was divided in 1255 among Otto's sons, Louis received the Palatinate and Upper Bavaria, while his brother duke Henry XIII of Bavaria received Lower Bavaria. This partition was against the law and therefore caused the anger of the bishops in Bavaria who later allied themselves with king Ottokar II of Bohemia in 1257. During the German interregnum, after King William's death in 1256, Louis supported King Richard of Cornwall. In August 1257 King Ottokar finally invaded Bavaria, but Louis and Henry managed to repulse the attack. It was one of the rare concerted and harmonious actions of the two brothers, who often argued.

The main residences of Louis were at Alter Hof located at the very north-eastern part of Munich and Heidelberg Castle. As one of the Prince-electors of the empire, he was strongly involved in the royal elections for forty years. Together with his brother, Louis also aided his young Hohenstaufen nephew Conradin in his duchy of Swabia, but it was not possible to enforce Conradin's election as German king. As a result of his support for the Hohenstaufen, Louis was excommunicated by the pope in 1266. In 1267 when his nephew crossed the Alps with an army, Louis accompanied Conradin only to Verona. After the young prince's execution in Naples in 1268, Louis inherited some of Conradin's possessions in Swabia and supported the election of the Habsburg Rudolph I against Ottokar II in 1273. On 26 August 1278, the armies of Rudolph and Louis met Ottokar's forces on the banks of the River Morava in the Battle of Dürnkrut and Jedenspeigen where Ottokar was defeated and killed. In 1289, the electoral dignity of Bavaria passed to Bohemia again, but Louis remained an elector as Count Palatine of the Rhine. After Rudolph's death in 1291, Louis could not enforce the election of his Habsburg brother-in-law Albert I against Adolf of Nassau.

Louis died at Heidelberg on 2 February 1294. He was succeeded by his eldest surviving son Rudolf I who had Adolf of Nassau as his father-in-law a few months later. Louis was buried in the crypt of Fürstenfeld Abbey.

== Family and children ==
Louis II was married three times.

=== The execution of Maria of Brabant ===
He had his first wife, Maria of Brabant—a daughter of Henry II, Duke of Brabant and Marie of Hohenstaufen—beheaded in 1256, on suspicion of adultery. Any actual guilt on her part could never be validated. As expiation, Louis founded the Cistercian friary Fürstenfeld Abbey (Fürstenfeldbruck) near Munich.

Different sources tell varying tales about how this happened: In 1256, Louis had been away from home for an extended time due to his responsibilities as a sovereign in the area of the Rhine. His wife wrote two letters, one to her husband, and another to the count of Kyburg at Hunsrück, a vassal of Louis. Details about the actual content of the second letter vary, but according to the chroniclers, the messenger who carried the letter to Louis had been given the wrong one, and Louis came to the conclusion that his wife had a secret love affair.

Over time a great many tales of folklore sprang up around Louis' deed, most of them written long after his death: Ballad-mongers embellished the tale into a murderous frenzy during which Louis allegedly not only killed his wife after having ridden home for five days and nights, but also stabbed the messenger who brought him the wrong letter; then upon entering his castle, stabbed his own castellan and a court lady and threw his wife's maid from the battlements, before he murdered his wife either by stabbing her or cutting off her head.

Several more restrained chronicles support the account of Marie's execution on 18 January 1256 at Mangoldstein Castle in Donauwörth by ducal decree for alleged adultery, but nothing beyond that.

=== Later marriages ===
Louis married his second wife, Anna of Glogau, in 1260. They had the following children:

- Maria of Bavaria (b. 1261), became a nun in Marienberg abbey at Boppard.
- Agnes (1262 – 21 October 1269).
- Ludwig of Bavaria (13 September 1267 – 23 November 1290, killed at a tournament at Nuremberg).

He married his third wife, Matilda of Habsburg, daughter of Rudolph I of Germany, on 24 October 1273. Their children were:

- Rudolf I, Duke of Bavaria (4 October 1274, Basel – 12 August 1319).
- Matilda (Mechthild) of Bavaria, Duchess of Brunswick-Lüneburg (1275 – 28 March 1319, Lüneburg), married 1288 to Duke Otto II of Brunswick-Lüneburg
- Agnes of Bavaria, Margravine of Brandenburg-Stendal (c. 1276/78 – 22 July 1345), married firstly in 1290 to Landgrave Henry "the Younger" of Hesse and secondly around 1298/1303 to Henry I, Margrave of Brandenburg-Stendal
- Anna of Bavaria (b. 1280), became a nun in Ulm.
- Louis IV, Holy Roman Emperor (1 April 1282, Munich – 11 October 1347, Puch (now a district of Fürstenfeldbruck)) and King of Italy.

Louis II was succeeded by his eldest surviving son Rudolf I.

== Sources ==
- Earenfight, Theresa (2013). Queenship in Medieval Europe. Palgrave Macmillan.
- Jeffery, Renée (2018). Princess Elisabeth of Bohemia: The Philosopher Princess. Lexington Books.
- Thomas, Andrew L. (2010). A House Divided: Wittelsbach Confessional Court Cultures in the Holy Roman Empire, c.1550-1650. Brill.

Louis II, Duke of Bavaria House of Wittelsbach Born: 1229 Died: 1294
German royalty
Preceded by Otto II	Duke of Bavaria; 1253-1255	Succeeded by Division of Bavaria
Preceded by Otto II	Count Palatine of the Rhine; 1253-1294	Succeeded by Rudolf I and with Ludwig IV
Preceded by Created	Duke of Upper Bavaria; 1255-1294	Succeeded by Rudolf I and with Ludwig IV
