= List of margravines of Meissen =

The Margraviate of Meissen was a territorial state on the border of the Holy Roman Empire. The margravines of Meissen were the consorts of the margraves of Meissen.

== Margravine of Meissen ==
=== Non-dynastic, 963–985 ===
Picture	Name	Father	Birth	Marriage	Became Margravine	Ceased to be Margravine	Death	Spouse
	Swanehilde of Saxony	Hermann Billung, Duke of Saxony (Billung)	945/955	970		3 August 979 husband's death	26 November 1014	Thietmar
The name of Rikdag's wife is unknown, but he had several children								Rikdag

=== Ekkehardingian dynasty, 985–1046 ===
Picture	Name	Father	Birth	Marriage	Became Margravine	Ceased to be Margravine	Death	Spouse
	Swanehilde of Saxony	Hermann Billung, Duke of Saxony (Billung)	945/955	before 1000		30 April 1002 husband's death	26 November 1014	Eckard I
The name of Gunzelin's wife is unknown, but he had several children; she main have been a sister of Bolesław I Chrobry.								Gunzelin
	Regelinda of Poland	Bolesław I Chrobry (Piast)	989	1002/1003	1009, after August husband's accession'	21 March aft. 1014		Herman I
	Uta of Ballenstedt	Adalbert I, Count of Ballenstedt (Ascania)	1000	–	1032 or 1038 husband's accession'	23 October, bef. 1046		Eckard II

=== Weimar-Orlamünde dynasty, 1046–1062 ===
Picture	Name	Father	Birth	Marriage	Became Margravine	Ceased to be Margravine	Death	Spouse
	Adela of Louvain	Lambert II of Leuven or his brother Reginar of Leuven (Leuven)	–	before 1060	1062 husband's accession'	early 1067 husband's death	1083	Otto I

=== Brunonen dynasty, 1067–1089 ===
Picture	Name	Father	Birth	Marriage	Became Margravine	Ceased to be Margravine	Death	Spouse
	Immilla of Turin	Ulric Manfred II of Turin (Arduinici)	–	1058	January 1048 husband's accession	28 September 1057 husband's death	1078, before 29 April	Egbert I
	Oda of Weimar	Otto I, Margrave of Meissen (Weimar-Orlamünde)	–	before 1080		1089 husband's desposition	1111	Egbert II

=== Wettin dynasty, 1089–1123 ===
Picture	Name	Father	Birth	Marriage	Became Margravine	Ceased to be Margravine	Death	Spouse
	Gertrude of Brunswick	Egbert I, Margrave of Meissen (Brunonen)	1060	1101/2		1103 husband's death	9 December 1117	Henry I
	Adelaide of Stade	Lothair Udo III, Margrave of the Nordmark (Udonids)	1098–1106	–		1123 husband's death	–	Henry II

=== Groitzsch dynasty, 1123–1124 ===
Picture	Name	Father	Birth	Marriage	Became Margravine	Ceased to be Margravine	Death	Spouse
	Cunigunde of Weimar	Otto I, Margrave of Meissen (Weimar-Orlamünde)	–	1110	1123 husband's accession	22 May 1124 husband's death	8 June 1140	Wiprecht

=== Wettin dynasty, 1124–1547 ===
Picture	Name	Father	Birth	Marriage	Became Margravine	Ceased to be Margravine	Death	Spouse
	Luitgard of Elchingen-Ravenstein	Adalbert, Count of Elchingen-Ravenstein	–	before 1119	1123 husband's appointment	19 June 1145		Conrad
	Hedwig of Brandenburg	Albert the Bear (Ascania)	1124/35	1144/7	5 February 1157 husband's accession	18 February 1190 husband's death	end of March 1203	Otto II
	Sophia of Bohemia	Frederick, Duke of Bohemia (Přemyslids)	před 1176	23 April 1186	18 February 1190 husband's accession	24 May 1195		Albert I
(1195–1198); Direct rule by Emperor Henry VI
	Jutta of Thuringia	Hermann I, Landgrave of Thuringia (Ludowing)	1184	1194	1198 husband regains Meissen	18 January 1221 husband's death	6 August 1235	Dietrich I
	Constance of Austria	Leopold VI, Duke of Austria (Babenberg)	–	1 May 1234		1243 before 5 June		Henry III
	Agnes of Bohemia	Wenceslaus I of Bohemia (Přemyslids)	–	1244		10 August 1268		Henry III
	Elisabeth of Maltitz	Ulrich von Maltitz	1238/9	before 1273		15 February 1288 husband's death	25 January 1333	Henry III
	Elisabeth of Orlamünde	Hermann III, Count of Orlamünde	1270	before 1 October 1290		1292 husband's desposition	before 24 March 1333	Albert II
	Catherine of Bavaria	Henry XIII, Duke of Bavaria (Wittelsbach)	9 June 1267	1287	1289 husband's accession	16 August 1291 husband's death	9 January 1310	Frederick Tuta
	Jutta of Henneberg	Berthold VIII, Count of Henneberg (Henneberg)	1272	22 July 1295	1292 husband's accession	10 December 1307 husband's death	25 April 1317	Dietrich II
	Agnes of Gorizia-Tyrol	Meinhard, Duke of Carinthia (Meinhardiner)	–	1 June 1285	1292 husband's accession	14 May 1293		Frederick I
	Elisabeth of Lobdeburg-Arnshaugk	Otto, Count of Lobdeburg-Arnshaugk	1286	24 August 1300		16 November 1323 husband's death	22 August 1359	Frederick I
	Matilde of Bavaria	Louis IV, Holy Roman Emperor (Wittelsbach)	after 21 June 1313	early May 1323		2 July 1346		Frederick II
	Catherine of Henneberg	Heinrich XII, Count of Henneberg (Henneberg)	1334	1344/6	18 November 1349 husband's accession	21 May 1381 husband's death	15 July 1397	Frederick III
	Margaret of Nuremberg	Albrecht, Burgrave of Nuremberg (House of Hohenzollern)	1359	22 July 1374		13 November 1382; Chemnitzer Teilung	between 1 May 1389 and 16 August 1391	Balthasar
	Elisabeth of Moravia	John Henry, Margrave of Moravia (Luxembourg)	1355	1366		20 November 1400		William I
	Anna of Brunswick-Göttingen	Otto, Duke of Brunswick-Göttingen (Welf)	1387	by 7 May 1402		10 February 1407 husband's death	27 October 1426	William I
	Catherine of Brunswick-Lüneburg	Henry the Mild, Duke of Brunswick-Lüneburg (Welf)	1395	8 February 1402	10 February 1407 husband's accession	4 January 1428 husband's death	28 December 1442	Frederick IV
	Amelia of Masovia	Siemowit IV, Duke of Masovia (Piast)	1396/9	16 May 1413		30 March 1425 husband's death	after 17 May 1424	William II
	Anna of Schwarzburg	Günther XV, Count of Schwarzburg (Schwarzburg)	–	1407	10 February 1407 husband's accession	16 January 1431		Frederick V
The Division of Altenburg on September 26, 1445 attempted to divide the Saxon lands between Frederick IV's two sons Frederick VI and William III. But when Frederick VI chose the western part (Thuringia) instead of Meissen, William III rejected his choice and the Saxon Fratricidal War started. In the end Frederick VI received Meissen and William III received Thuringia.
	Margaret of Austria	Ernest, Duke of Austria (Habsburg)	1416/17	3 June 1431		7 September 1464 husband's death	12 February 1486	Frederick VI
The Treaty of Leipzig on August 26, 1485 divided the Saxon lands between Frederick VI's two sons Albert IV and Ernest. Albert IV received Meissen and established his court there.
	Sidonie of Poděbrady	George of Kunštát and Poděbrady, King of Bohemia (Poděbrady)	14 November 1449	11 November 1464		12 September 1500 husband's death	1 February 1510	Albert IV
	Barbara Jagiellon	Casimir IV Jagiellon, King of Poland (Jagiellon)	15 July 1478	21 November 1496	12 September 1500 husband's accession	15 February 1534		George
	Catherine of Mecklenburg-Schwerin	Magnus II, Duke of Mecklenburg-Schwerin and Güstrow (Mecklenburg-Schwerin)	1487	6 July 1512	17 April 1539 husband's ascension	18 August 1541 husband's death	6 June 1561	Henry IV
	Agnes of Hesse	Philip I, Landgrave of Hesse (Hesse)	31 May 1527	9 January 1541	18 August 1541 husband's accession	24 April 1547 became electress	4 November 1555	Maurice
Final great Wettin dynastic division Meissen subsumed into the Electorate of Saxony. See also Electress of Saxony

== See also ==
- List of Saxon consorts
