= Balthasar, Landgrave of Thuringia =

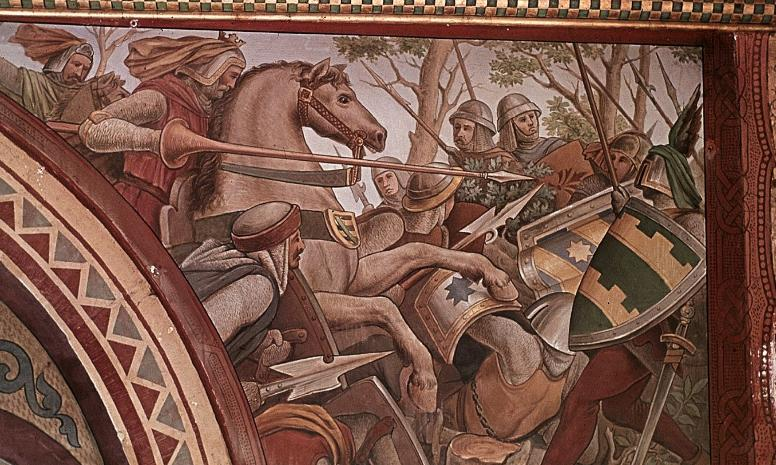
- Landgrave Balthasar in his fight against the robber barons (fresco by Moritz von Schwind in the Landgrave's room in the Wartburg in Eisenach)
- Born: 21 December 1336; Weißenfels
- Died: 18 May 1406 (aged 69); Wartburg in Eisenach
- Spouse: Margaret of Nuremberg; Anna of Saxe-Wittenberg
- Issue: Frederick IV, Landgrave of Thuringia
- House: House of Wettin
- Father: Frederick II, Margrave of Meissen
- Mother: Mathilde of Bavaria

Landgrave Balthasar of Thuringia (21 December 1336 in Weißenfels – 18 May 1406 at the Wartburg in Eisenach) was Margrave of Meissen and Landgrave of Thuringia from the House of Wettin.

== Life ==
Balthasar was the second son of Frederick the Serious. After his father's death in 1349, his elder brother Frederick the Austere acted as regent and guardian for Balthasar and his brothers William I and Louis. After they came of age, William and Balthasar ruled jointly with Frederick.

After Frederick's death, a conflict arose between the brothers Balthasar and William on the one hand, and their nephews, Frederick the Warlike, William the rich and George on the other hand. This was resolved on November 1382, with the so-called Division of Chemnitz in which Balthasar received the Landgraviate of Thuringia.

== Marriage and issue ==
Balthasar first married, in the spring of 1374, with Margaret, the daughter of Burgrave Albert of Nuremberg (d. 1390). With her, he had a son and a daughter:

- Frederick the Peaceable, who succeeded him as Landgrave of Thuringia
- Anna of Meissen (d. 4 July 1395), who married Rudolf III, Duke of Saxe-Wittenberg

After Margaret's death, Balthasar married Anna of Saxe-Wittenberg (d. 1426), the widow of Duke Frederick I of Brunswick-Lüneburg. This marriage remained childless.

== Ancestry ==
Ancestors of Balthasar, Landgrave of Thuringia

16. Henry III, Margrave of Meissen
8. Albert II, Margrave of Meissen
17. Constantia of Austria
4. Frederick I, Margrave of Meissen
18. Frederick II, Holy Roman Emperor
9. Margaret of Sicily
19. Isabella of England
2. Frederick II, Margrave of Meissen
20. Otto IV, Count of Lobdeburg-Arnshaugk
10. Hartmann XI, Count of Lobdeburg-Arnshaugk
21. Hedwig of Schwarzburg
5. Elizabeth of Lobdeburg-Arnshaugk
22. Hermann III, Count of Weimar-Orlamünde
11. Elisabeth, Countess of Weimar-Orlamünde
1. Balthasar, Landgrave of Thuringia
24. Otto II Wittelsbach, Duke of Bavaria
12. Louis II, Duke of Bavaria
25. Agnes of the Palatinate
6. Louis IV, Holy Roman Emperor
26. Rudolf I of Germany
13. Matilda of Habsburg
27. Gertrude of Hohenberg
3. Mathilde of Bavaria
28. Bolesław II Rogatka
14. Bolko I the Strict
29. Hedwig of Anhalt
7. Beatrix of Silesia-Glogau
30. Otto V, Margrave of Brandenburg-Salzwedel
15. Beatrice of Brandenburg
31. Judith of Henneberg-Coburg

Balthasar, Landgrave of Thuringia House of Wettin Born: 21 December 1336 Died: 18 May 1406
Preceded by Frederick II	Margrave of Meissen; 1349–1382; With: Frederick III and William I	Margraviate divided
New division	Landgrave of Thuringia; 1382–1406	Succeeded by Frederick IV
