= Elector Frederick =

Elector Frederick may refer to:

- Frederick William, the Great Elector
- Frederick I, Elector of Brandenburg
- Frederick II, Elector of Brandenburg
- Frederick I, Elector Palatine
- Frederick II, Elector Palatine
- Frederick III, Elector Palatine
- Frederick IV, Elector Palatine
- Frederick V, Elector Palatine, or The Winter King, husband of Princess Elizabeth Stuart of England and Scotland
- Frederick Christian, Elector of Saxony
- Frederick I, Elector of Saxony
- Frederick Augustus I, Elector of Saxony
- Frederick II, Elector of Saxony
- Frederick III, Elector of Saxony, commonly called Frederick the Wise.
