= Frederick IV of Thuringia =

Frederick IV
- Landgrave of Thuringia
- Thuringia-Meissen coat of arms
- Born: before 30 November 1384
- Died: 7 May 1440; Runneburg Castle, Weißensee, Thuringia
- Noble family: House of Wettin
- Spouse: Anna of Schwarzburg-Blankenburg
- Father: Balthasar, Landgrave of Thuringia
- Mother: Margaret of Nuremberg

Frederick IV (before 30 November 1384 – 7 May 1440), nicknamed the Peaceful (German: Friedrich der Friedfertige) or the Simple (der Einfältige), was a member of the House of Wettin and Margrave of Meissen who ruled as the last independent Landgrave of Thuringia from 1406 until his death.

== Life ==
He was the son of Landgrave Balthasar of Thuringia and his first wife, the Hohenzollern princess Margaret of Nuremberg. His father had received the Landgraviate of Thuringia in the 1382 Division of Chemnitz and was able to largely extend his territories in several skirmishes with the local nobility. After the death of his first wife Margaret in 1391, he secondly married the Ascanian princess Anna of Saxe-Wittenberg.

Landgrave Balthasar planned to marry his son off to Elizabeth of Görlitz, a granddaughter of the late Luxembourg emperor Charles IV; nevertheless, these attempts had already failed, when Frederick succeeded his father in 1406. One year later he married Countess Anna (d. 1431), the daughter of Count Günther XXX of Schwarzburg-Blankenburg. Their marriage remained childless.

Frederick is considered a relatively weak ruler, who was at times very dependent on the influence of his wife and her relatives. To finance his lavish court, he sold more and more land and titles. In 1436, he had all Jews expelled from Thuringia.

After Frederick's death without heirs, Thuringia was inherited by his two Wettin cousins, Elector Frederick II of Saxony and his brother William III. He had already sold them the more remote areas of Meissen some years earlier for 15000guilders. The succession led to the 1445 Division of Altenburg and the subsequent Saxon Fratricidal War.

== Ancestors ==
Ancestors of Frederick IV of Thuringia

16. Albert II, Margrave of Meissen
8. Frederick I, Margrave of Meissen
17. Margaret of Sicily
4. Frederick II, Margrave of Meissen
18. Hartmann XI, Count of Lobdeburg-Arnshaugk
9. Elisabeth of Lobdeburg-Arnshaugk
19. Elisabeth, Countess of Weimar-Orlamünde
2. Balthasar, Landgrave of Thuringia
20. Louis II, Duke of Bavaria
10. Louis IV, Holy Roman Emperor
21. Matilda of Habsburg
5. Mathilde of Bavaria
22. Bolko I the Strict
11. Beatrix of Silesia-Glogau
23. Beatrice of Brandenburg
1. Frederick IV, Landgrave of Thuringia
24. Frederick III, Burgrave of Nuremberg
12. Frederick IV, Burgrave of Nuremberg
25. Helen of Saxony
6. Albert of Nuremberg
26. Albert of Gorizia
13. Margaret of Gorizia
27. Agnes of Hohenberg
3. Margaret of Nuremberg
28. Berthold VII, Count of Henneberg-Schleusingen
14. Henry IV, Count of Henneberg-Schleusingen
29. Adelheid of Hesse
7. Sophie of Henneberg-Schleusingen
30. Herman, Margrave of Brandenburg-Salzwedel
15. Judith of Brandenburg-Salzwedel
31. Anne of Austria

Frederick IV of Thuringia House of Wettin Born: before 30 November 1384 Died: 7 May 1440
Preceded by Balthasar	Landgrave of Thuringia; 1406–1440	Succeeded by Frederick II, Elector of Saxony
