= William III of Thuringia =

Landgrave of Thuringia from the Wettin dynasty

William III, Landgrave of Thuringia
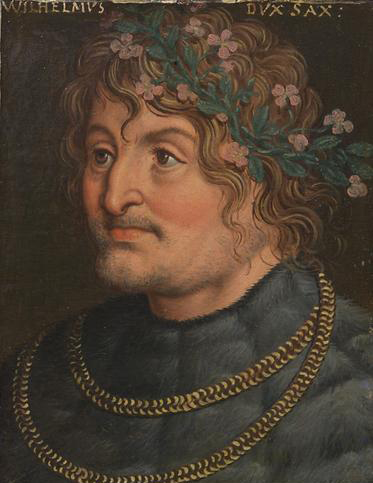
- Wilhelm III of Thuringia by Anton Boys
- Born: 30 April 1425; Meissen, Germany
- Died: 17 September 1482 (aged 57); Weimar, Germany
- Noble family: House of Wettin
- Spouse: Anne of Luxembourg
- Issue: Margaret of Thuringia; Katharina of Thuringia
- Father: Frederick I, Elector of Saxony
- Mother: Catherine of Brunswick and Lunenburg

William III (30 April 1425 – 17 September 1482), called the Brave (in German Wilhelm der Tapfere), was landgrave of Thuringia (from 1445) and claimant duke of Luxemburg (from 1457). He is actually the second William to rule Thuringia, and in Luxembourg; he was the third Margrave of Meissen named William.

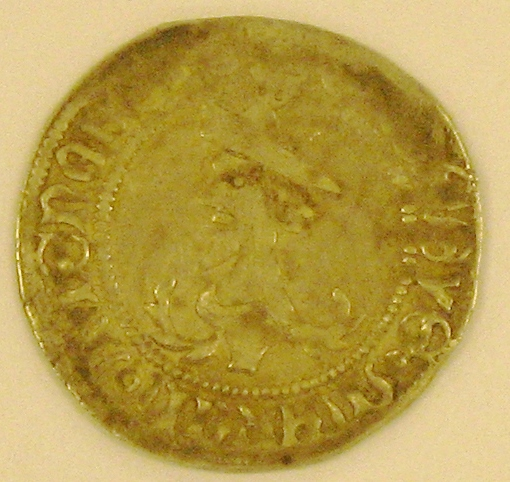
Judenkopf Groschen

He was a younger son of Frederick I the Warlike, elector of Saxony, and Catherine of Brunswick and Lunenburg. On 2 June 1446 he married Anne of Luxembourg, daughter of Albert II, King of Germany, Bohemia and Hungary and Elizabeth of Luxembourg. On behalf of his wife, he became Duke of Luxembourg from 1457 to 1469. They had two daughters, Margaret of Thuringia (1449–1501) and Catherine of Thuringia (1453 – 10 July 1534), who married Duke Henry II of Münsterberg.

William minted a silver groschen known as the Judenkopf Groschen. Its obverse portrait shows a man with a pointed beard wearing a Jewish hat, which the populace took as depicting a typical Jew.

== Ancestors ==
Ancestors of William III of Thuringia

8. Frederick II, Margrave of Meissen
4. Frederick III, Landgrave of Thuringia
9. Mathilde of Bavaria
2. Frederick I, Elector of Saxony
10. Henry IV of Henneberg-Schleusingen
5. Catherine of Henneberg
11. Judith of Brandenburg-Salzwedel
1.William III, Landgrave of Thuringia
12. Magnus II, Duke of Brunswick-Lüneburg
6. Henry the Mild, Duke of Brunswick-Lüneburg
13. Catherine of Anhalt-Bernburg
3. Catherine of Brunswick-Lüneburg
14. Wartislaw VI, Duke of Pomerania
7. Sophie of Pomerania-Wolgast
15. Anne of Mecklenburg-Stargard

William III of Thuringia House of Wettin Born: 30 April 1425 Died: 17 September 1482
Preceded by Frederick V	Margrave of Meissen as William III; 1445–1464	Succeeded by Albert
Preceded by Frederick V	Landgrave of Thuringia as William II; 1445–1482	Succeeded by Albert
