= Frederick II, Elector of Saxony =

Elector of Saxony from 1428 to 1464

Frederick II
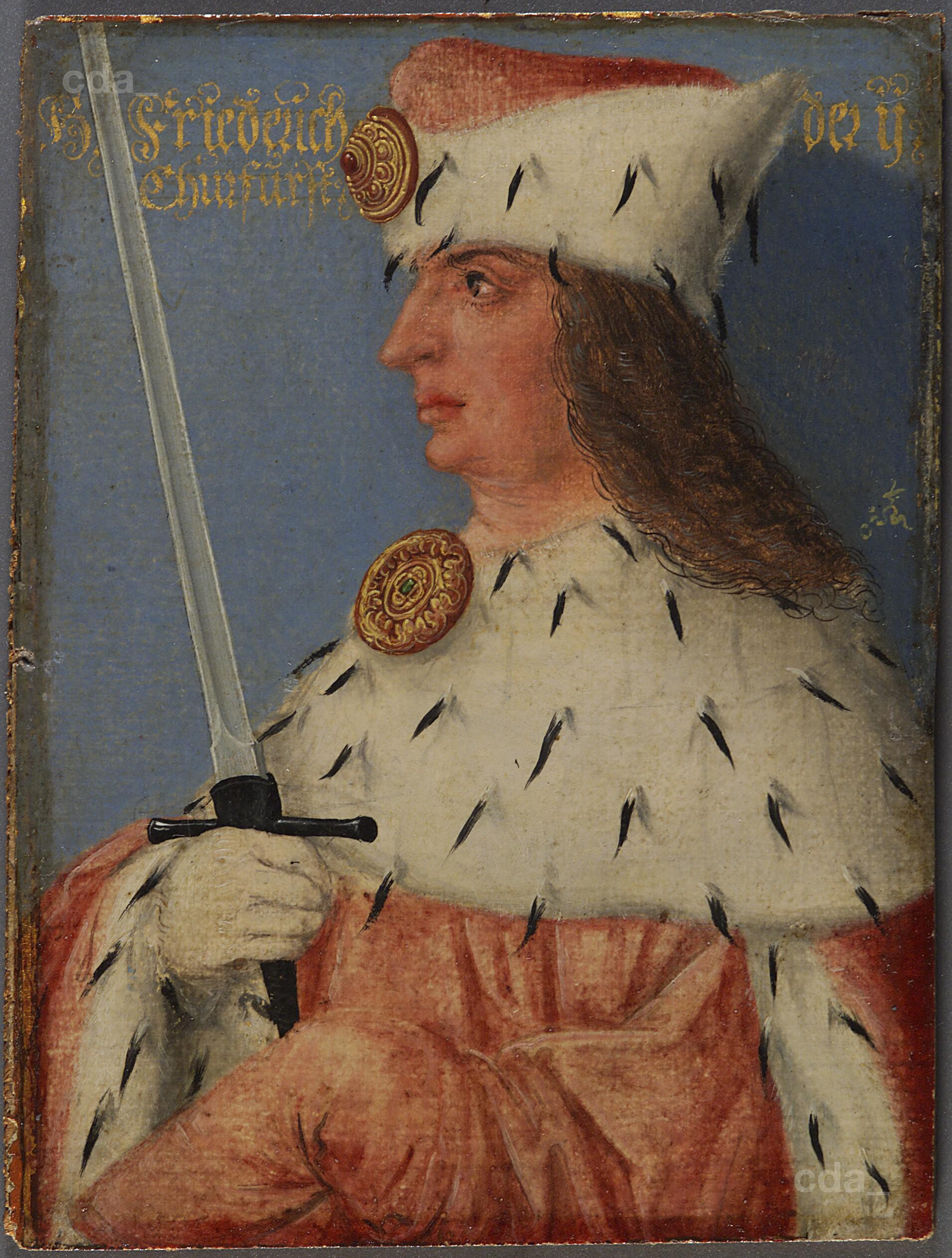
- Near contemporary portrait by Lucas Cranach the Younger

Prince-Elector and Arch-Marshal of the Holy Roman Empire
- Reign: 4 January 1428 – 7 September 1464
- Predecessor: Frederick I
- Successor: Ernest

Duke of Saxony and Margrave of Meissen
- Reign: 4 January 1428 – 7 September 1464
- Predecessor: Frederick IV/I
- Successor: Ernest and Albert IV/III

Landgrave of Thuringia
- Reign: 7 May 1440 - 1445
- Predecessor: Frederick IV
- Successor: William II
- Born: 22 August 1412; Leipzig, Electorate of Saxony, Holy Roman Empire
- Died: 7 September 1464 (aged 52); Leipzig, Electorate of Saxony, Holy Roman Empire
- Burial: Meissen Cathedral
- Spouse: Margaret of Austria (m. 1431)
- Issue Detail: Amalia, Duchess of Bavaria; Anna, Electress of Brandenburg; Frederick, Electoral Prince of Saxony; Ernest, Elector of Saxony; Albert III, Duke of Saxony; Margaret, Abbess of Seusslitz; Hedwig, Abbess of Quedlinburg
- House: Wettin
- Father: Frederick I, Elector of Saxony
- Mother: Catherine of Brunswick and Lunenburg

Frederick II, The Gentle (German: Friedrich, der Sanftmütige'; Frederick the Gentle; 22 August 1412 – 7 September 1464) was Prince-Elector and Arch-Marshal of the Holy Roman Empire, who ruled as Duke of Saxony and Margrave of Meissen (1428–1464) and Landgrave of Thuringia (1440–1445). His succession laid the basis for the later division of the House of Wettin, as his two sons, Ernest and Albert, inherited his territories jointly, before eventually forming the Ernestine and Albertine branches, through the Treaty of Leipzig (1485).

== Biography ==
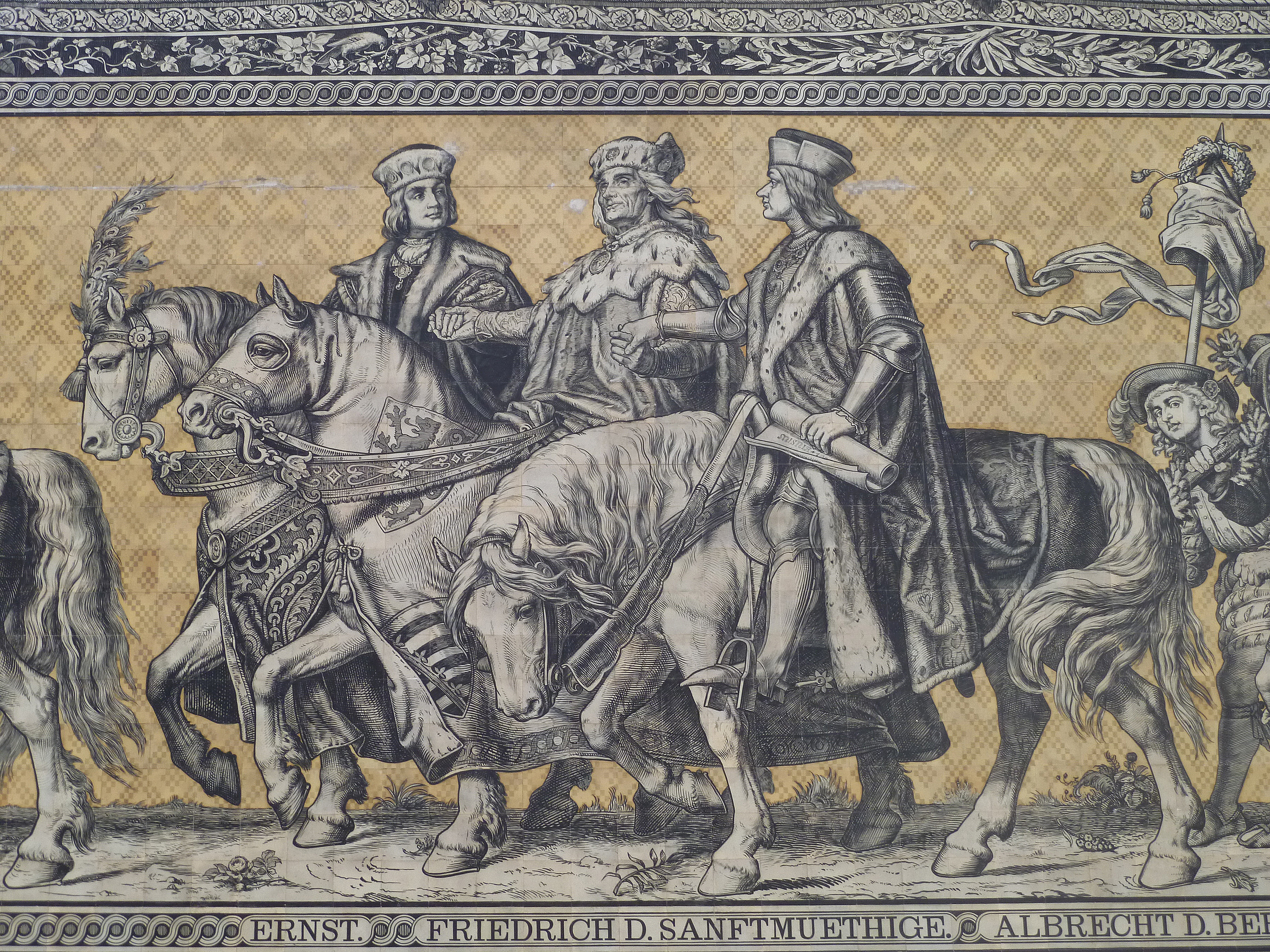
Ernest, Elector of Saxony (1464–1486), Frederick II, Elector of Saxony (1428–1464) and Albert III, Duke of Saxony (1486–1500); Fürstenzug, Dresden, Germany

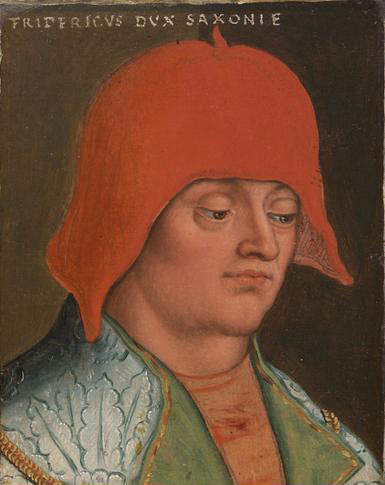
Frederick II of Saxony

Frederick was born in Leipzig, the eldest of the seven children of Frederick I, Elector of Saxony, and Catherine of Brunswick and Lunenburg.

After the death of his father in 1428 he took over the government together with his younger brothers William III, Henry and Sigismund. In 1433 the Wettins finally concluded peace with the Hussites and in 1438 Frederick led Saxon forces to victory in the Battle of Sellnitz. That same year it was considered the first federal state parliament of Saxony. The parliament received the right to find together in case of innovations in fiscal matters also without summoning by the ruler.

Also in 1438 it was decided that Frederick, and not his rival Bernard IV, duke of Saxe-Lauenburg, was entitled to exercise the Saxon electoral vote at the elections for the German throne. The elector then aided Albert II to secure this dignity, performing a similar service for his own brother-in-law, Frederick two years later.

After Henry's death in 1435, and Sigismund was forced to renounce and became a bishop (in 1440), Frederick and William divided their possessions. In the Division of Altenburg in 1445, William III received the Thuringian and Frankish part, and Frederick got the Eastern part of the principality. The mines remained common possessions. Disputes over the distribution led however in 1446 to the Saxon Brother War, which found an end only on 27 January 1451 with the peace of Naumburg. In the Treaty of Eger in (1459), elector Frederick, Duke William III and the king of Bohemia George of Podebrady fixed the borders between Bohemia and Saxony, at the height of the Ore Mountains (German: Erzgebirge) and the middle of the Elbe which still holds today. It belongs therefore to the oldest still existing borders of Europe.

After the death of Frederick, in Leipzig, both of his sons, Ernest and Albert, first took over the government together. After Duke William III died in 1482, Thuringia returned to Frederick's line.

== Family and issue ==
In Leipzig, Electoral Saxony on 3 June 1431 Frederick married Margaret of Austria, the daughter of Ernest of Austria and Cymburgis of Masovia. They had:

1. Amalia (b. Meissen, 4 August 1436 – d. Rochlitz, 19 October 1501), married on 21 March 1452 to Louis IX, Duke of Bavaria.
2. Anna (b. Meissen, 7 March 1437 – d. Neustadt am Aisch, 31 October 1512), married on 12 November 1458 to Albert III Achilles, Elector of Brandenburg
3. Frederick (b. Meissen, 28 August 1439 – d. Meissen, 23 December 1451).
4. Ernest, Elector of Saxony (b. Meissen, 24 March 1441 – d. Colditz, 26 August 1486).
5. Albert, Duke of Saxony (b. Grimma, 31 July 1443 – d. Emden, 12 September 1500).
6. Margaret (b. Meissen?, 1444 – d. Seusslitz?, ca. 19 November 1498), Abbess of Seusslitz.
7. Hedwig (b. Meissen?, 31 October 1445 – d. Quedlinburg, 13 June 1511), Abbess of Quedlinburg (1458).
8. Alexander (b. Meissen, 24 June 1447 – d. Meissen, 14 September 1447).

July 1455 saw the Prinzenraub, the attempt of a knight named Kunz von Kaufungen to abduct Frederick's sons Ernest and Albert. Having carried them off from Altenburg, Kunz was making his way to Bohemia when the plot was accidentally discovered and the princes restored.

== Ancestry ==
Ancestors of Frederick II, Elector of Saxony

8. Frederick II, Margrave of Meissen
4. Frederick III, Landgrave of Thuringia
9. Matilde of Bavaria
2. Frederick I, Elector of Saxony
10. Heinrich VIII of Henneberg-Schleusingen
5. Catherine of Henneberg
11. Judith of Brandenburg-Salzwedel
1. Frederick II, Elector of Saxony
12. Magnus II, Duke of Brunswick-Lüneburg
6. Henry the Mild, Duke of Brunswick-Lüneburg
13. Catherine von Anhalt-Bernburg
3. Catherine of Brunswick and Luenburg
14. Wartislaw VI, Duke of Pomerania-Barth
7. Sophie von Pomerania
15. Anna zu Mecklenburg-Stargard

== Sources ==
- Blaschke, Karlheinz (2002). "Die Leipziger Teilung der wettinischen Länder von 1485". Beiträge zur Verfassungs- und Verwaltungsgeschichte Sachsens: Ausgewählte Aufsätze von Karlheinz Blaschke. Leipzig: Leipziger Universitätsverlag. pp. 323–335.
- Groß, Reiner (2007). Die Wettiner. Stuttgart: Kohlhammer Verlag.
- Hohkamp, Michaela (2007). "Sisters, Aunts, and Cousins: Familial Architectures and the Political Field in Early Modern Europe". Kinship in Europe: Approaches to Long-Term Development (1300-1900). Berghahn books. pp. 91–104.
- Tebruck, Stefan (2005). "Zwischen Integration und Selbstbehauptung: Thüringen im wettinischen Herrschaftsbereich". Fragen der politischen Integration im mittelalterlichen Europa. Ostfildern: Jan Thorbecke Verlag. pp. 375–412, 589–591.
- Wilson, Peter H. (2016). Heart of Europe: A History of the Holy Roman Empire. Cambridge: Harvard University Press.

Frederick II, Elector of Saxony House of Wettin Born: 22 August 1412 Died: 7 September 1464
Regnal titles
Preceded by Frederick I	Elector of Saxony; 1428–1464	Succeeded by Ernest
Preceded by Frederick I	Duke of Saxony and Margrave of Meissen; 1428–1464	Succeeded by Ernest and Albert
Preceded by Frederick IV	Landgrave of Thuringia; 1440–1445	Succeeded by William II
