= Catherine of Saxony =

Catherine of Saxony may refer to:

- Catherine of Brunswick-Lüneburg (1395–1442), wife of Frederick I, Elector of Saxony
- Catherine of Saxony, Electress of Brandenburg (1421–1476), daughter of Frederick I, Elector of Saxony and wife of Frederick II, Elector of Brandenburg
- Catherine of Saxony, Duchess of Münsterberg (1453–1534), daughter of William III, Landgrave of Thuringia and wife of Henry II, Duke of Münsterberg; also known as Catherine of Thuringia
- Catherine of Saxony, Archduchess of Austria (1468–1524), daughter of Albert III, Duke of Saxony and wife of Sigismund, Archduke of Austria
- Catherine of Mecklenburg (1487–1561), wife of Henry IV, Duke of Saxony
