= List of rulers of Thuringia =

Thuringia is a historical and political region in central Germany.

== Kings of Thuringia ==
- 500?–507 Bisinus
- 507–529 Baderich
- 507–525 Berthachar
- 507–532 Herminafried

Conquered by the Franks.

== Frankish dukes of Thuringia ==
Merovingian dukes

- 632–642 Radulf I, "King of Thuringia" after 641
- 642–687 Heden I
- 687–689 Gozbert
- 689–719 Heden II, son

Carolingian dukes

- 849–873 Thachulf, Margrave of the Sorbian March
- 874–880 Radulf II, son
- 880–892 Poppo, House of Babenberg, dux Thuringorum in 892, deposed
  - 882–886 Egino, brother
- 892–906 Conrad, ancestor of the Conradiner dynasty
- 907–908 Burchard, last duke, killed in battle against the Hungarians

Ruled by the Margraves of Meissen

- 1000–1002 Eckard I, Margrave of Meissen since 985, assassinated
- 1002–1003 William II, Count of Weimar
- 1046–1062 William IV, grandson, Margrave of Meissen
- 1062–1067 Otto, brother, Margrave of Meissen
- 1067–1090 Egbert II, son-in-law, Count of Brunswick from the Brunonen dynasty, killed in 1090, line extinct

== Landgraves of Thuringia ==
=== Winzenburger ===
- 1111/1112–1130 Herman I, Count of Winzenburg (deposed in 1130; died in 1138)

=== Ludovingians ===
- 1031–1056 Louis the Bearded
- 1056–1123 Louis the Springer
- 1123–1140 Louis I (first Landgrave from 1131)
- 1140–1172 Louis II the Iron
- 1172–1190 Louis III the Pious
- 1190–1217 Hermann I the Hard
- 1217–1227 Louis IV the Holy
- 1227–1241 Hermann II
- 1241–1242 Henry Raspe
- 1242–1264 Sophia (in Hesse only)

=== House of Wettin ===
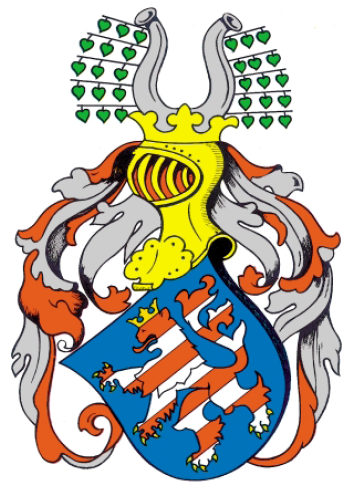
Coat of arms of Landgrave Albert, 1265

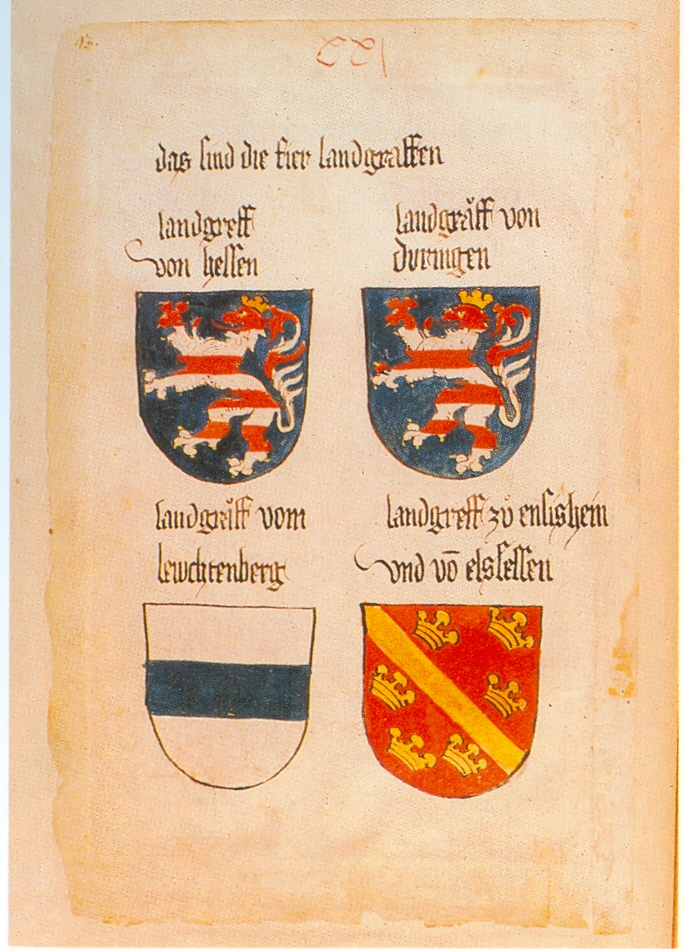
The Ludovingian coat of arms, shown as the coat of arms of the landgraves of both Hesse and Thüringen in the Ingeram Codex of 1459.

- 1242–1265 Henry the Illustrious, Margrave of Meissen and Lusatia since 1221
- 1265–1294 Albert the Degenerate, son, Margrave of Meissen from 1288 until 1292, sold Thuringia to
- 1294–1298 Adolf of Nassau-Weilburg, King of Germany (not Wettin)
- 1298–1307 Albert of Habsburg, King of Germany (not Wettin)
- 1298–1307 Theodoric IV, Margrave of Lusatia from 1291 until 1303
- 1298–1323 Frederick I
- 1323–1349 Frederick II
- 1349–1381 Frederick III
- 1349–1382 William I
- 1349–1406 Balthasar
- 1406–1440 Frederick IV
- 1440–1445 Frederick V
- 1445–1482 William II
- 1482–1485 Albert
- 1482–1486 Ernest
- 1486–1525 Frederick VI (a.k.a. Frederick III, Prince-Elector Saxony or ‘Frederick the Wise’)
- 1525–1532 John
- 1532–1547 John Frederick I
- 1542–1553 John Ernest
- 1554–1566 John Frederick II
- 1554–1572 John William
