= William I of Meissen =

Margrave of Meissen

William I, Margrave of Meissen
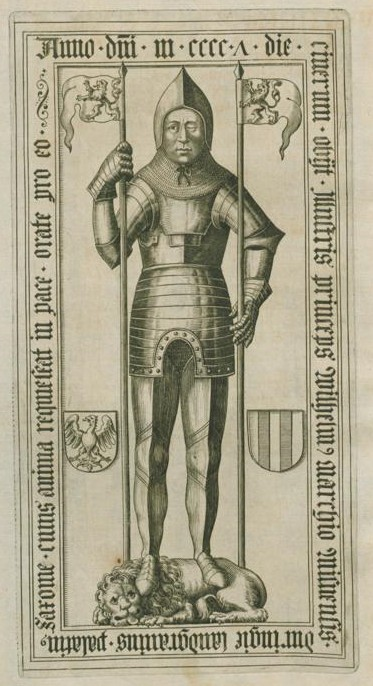
- Born: 19 December 1343; Dresden
- Died: 9 February 1407 (aged 63); Grimma Castle
- Noble family: House of Wettin
- Spouses: Elizabeth of Moravia; Anna of Brunswick-Lüneburg
- Father: Frederick II, Margrave of Meissen
- Mother: Mathilde of Bavaria

William I, the One-Eyed (19 December 1343, Dresden – 9 February 1407, Schloss Grimma) was Margrave of Meissen. His nickname is related to the legend that Saint Benno appeared to him because of his disputes with the Church in a dream and he had an eye gouged out.

== Life ==
William was the son of Frederick II, Margrave of Meissen and Mathilde of Bavaria. He had his father and the country until 1382 reigned together with his older brothers and alternately. After his brother Frederick III died 1381, he performed in 1382 with the remaining heirs so-called Division of Chemnitz, in which he was awarded the Margraviate of Meissen for an inheritance. Since 1395 he managed as governor (vicarius) Jobst of Moravia (his brother in law) and the March of Brandenburg. William was one of the most active Wettin princes, worked cleverly to the removal of powers of small noble-free estates in the interior of Meissen and the defence of the Bohemian House of Luxembourg. He also acquired the rule of Colditz, brought the rich possessions of the Burgraviate of Dohna, which he sold (Dohna Feud), in itself, and was a great patron of the Meissen Cathedral whose exemption he successfully helped to enforce. In 1404 William founded the Augustinian Monastery in Dresden, and fitted it out with possessions.

William's first wife was Elisabeth of Moravia (d. 1400), after whose death he married his second wife Anna of Brunswick, daughter of Otto I of Brunswick. Both marriages were childless, so his inheritance fell to his nephews Frederick the Peaceful, Frederick the Belligerent and William the Rich.

== Ancestry ==
Ancestors of William I of Meissen

16. Henry III, Margrave of Meissen
8. Albert II, Margrave of Meissen
17. Constantia of Austria
4. Frederick I, Margrave of Meissen
18. Frederick II, Holy Roman Emperor
9. Margaret of Sicily
19. Isabella of England
2. Frederick II, Margrave of Meissen
20. Otto IV, Count of Lobdeburg-Arnshaugk
10. Hartmann XI, Count of Lobdeburg-Arnshaugk
21. Hedwig of Schwarzburg
5. Elizabeth of Lobdeburg-Arnshaugk
22. Hermann III, Count of Weimar-Orlamünde
11. Elisabeth, Countess of Weimar-Orlamünde
1. William I, Margrave of Meissen
24. Otto II Wittelsbach, Duke of Bavaria
12. Louis II, Duke of Bavaria
25. Agnes of the Palatinate
6. Louis IV, Holy Roman Emperor
26. Rudolf I of Germany
13. Matilda of Habsburg
27. Gertrude of Hohenberg
3. Mathilde of Bavaria
28. Bolesław II Rogatka
14. Bolko I the Strict
29. Hedwig of Anhalt
7. Beatrix of Silesia-Glogau
30. Otto V, Margrave of Brandenburg-Salzwedel
15. Beatrice of Brandenburg
31. Judith of Henneberg-Coburg

William I of Meissen House of Wettin Born: 19 December 1343 Died: 9 February 1407
Preceded by Frederick III	Margrave of Meissen; 1382-1407	Succeeded by William II; Frederick I Frederick IV
