= Frederick III of Thuringia =

Frederick III
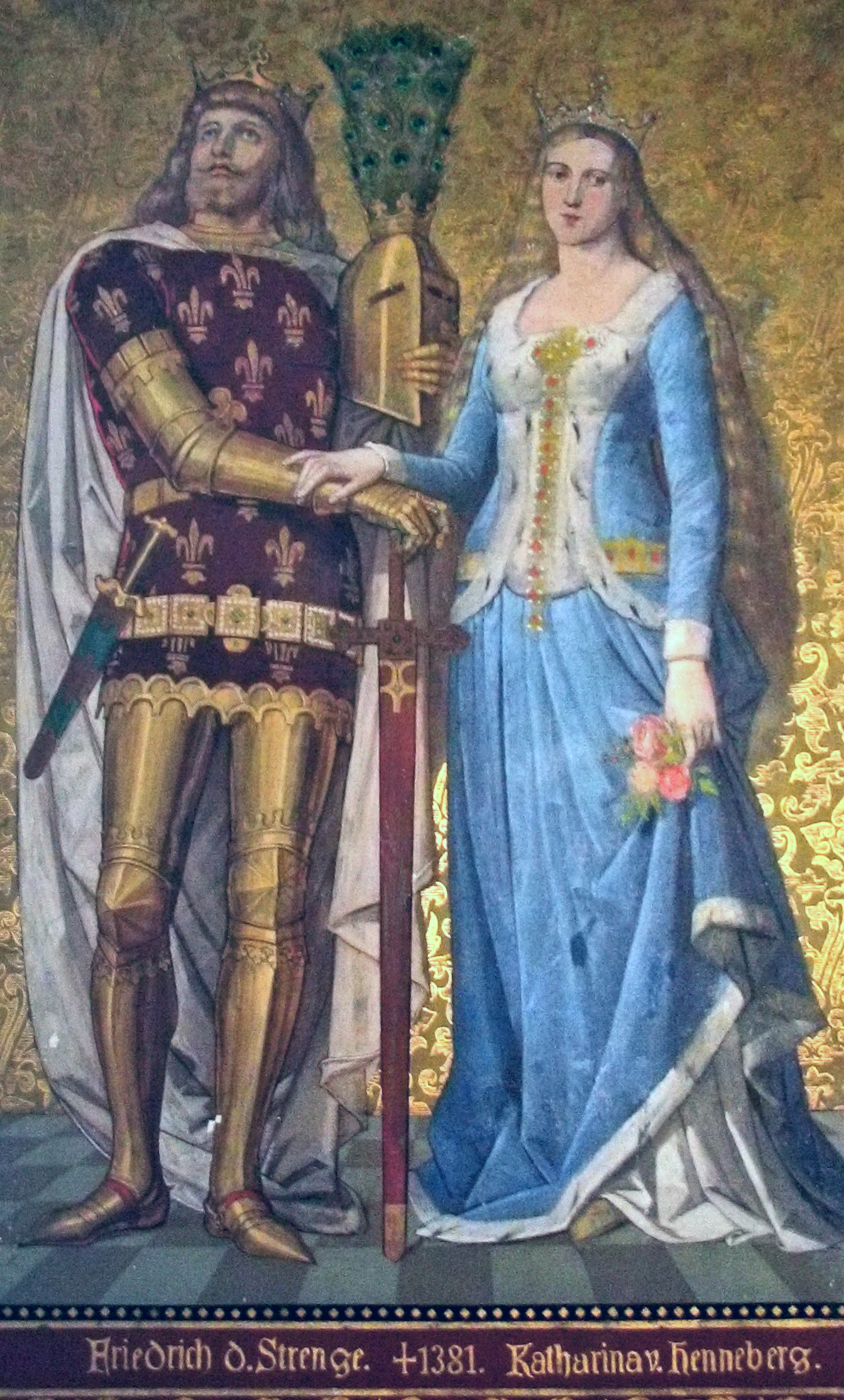
- Frederick III of Thuringia, painting from Albrechtsburg in Meißen

Margrave of Meissen
- Reign: 1349–1381
- Successor: (partitioned)

Landgrave of Thuringia
- Reign: 1349–1381
- Predecessor: Frederick I
- Successor: Balthasar
- Born: 14 December 1332; Dresden, Margravate of Meissen, Holy Roman Empire
- Died: 21 May 1381 (aged 48); Altenburg, Electorate of Saxony, Holy Roman Empire
- Burial: Altzella Abbey
- Spouse: Catherine of Henneberg
- Issue: Frederick I, Elector of Saxony; William II, Margrave of Meissen; George, Margrave of Meissen
- House: Wettin
- Father: Frederick II, Margrave of Meissen
- Mother: Mathilde of Bavaria

Frederick III the Strict (German: Friedrich III. der Strenge; 14 December 1332 – 21 May 1381) was Landgrave of Thuringia and Margrave of Meissen. A member of the House of Wettin, he strengthened the dynastic territories in central Germany during the mid-fourteenth century.

Born in Dresden, he assumed leadership in 1349 following the death of his father, Frederick II, Margrave of Meissen. He initially governed on behalf of his brothers, William, Balthasar, and Louis (Bishop of Bamberg). In 1350, the emperor confirmed the Margraviate of Meissen as a joint possession of the four brothers. From 1368 onward, they ruled collectively, with the exercise of authority rotating every two years. Their lands were permanently divided in 1379.

After Frederick's death in Altenburg in 1381, Meissen was partitioned among his three sons, while Thuringia passed to his brothers. It later went to his nephew Frederick IV, Landgrave of Thuringia, son of Balthasar, and was eventually inherited by Frederick's grandson, Frederick II, Elector of Saxony.

== Family ==
Frederick married Catherine of Henneberg, heiress of the Henneberg estates of Coburg, Neustadt, Sonneberg, Neuhaus, Rodach and other territories. She was the daughter of Count Heinrich IV of Henneberg and died in Coburg on 15 July 1397. They had four sons:

1. Frederick (died 1350).
2. Frederick I, Elector of Saxony (11 April 1370 – 4 January 1428).
3. William II, Margrave of Meissen (23 April 1371 – 30 March 1425).
4. George, Margrave of Meissen (1380 – 9 December 1401).

== Ancestry ==
Ancestors of Frederick III of Thuringia

16. Henry III, Margrave of Meissen
8. Albert II, Margrave of Meissen
17. Constantia of Austria
4. Frederick I, Margrave of Meissen
18. Frederick II, Holy Roman Emperor
9. Margaret of Sicily
19. Isabella of England
2. Frederick II, Margrave of Meissen
20. Otto IV, Count of Lobdeburg-Arnshaugk
10. Hartmann XI, Count of Lobdeburg-Arnshaugk
21. Hedwig of Schwarzburg
5. Elizabeth of Lobdeburg-Arnshaugk
22. Hermann III, Count of Weimar-Orlamünde
11. Elisabeth, Countess of Weimar-Orlamünde
1. Frederick III, Landgrave of Thuringia
24. Otto II Wittelsbach, Duke of Bavaria
12. Louis II, Duke of Bavaria
25. Agnes of the Palatinate
6. Louis IV, Holy Roman Emperor
26. Rudolf I of Germany
13. Matilda of Habsburg
27. Gertrude of Hohenberg
3. Mathilde of Bavaria
28. Bolesław II Rogatka
14. Bolko I the Strict
29. Hedwig of Anhalt
7. Beatrix of Silesia-Glogau
30. Otto V, Margrave of Brandenburg-Salzwedel
15. Beatrice of Brandenburg
31. Judith of Henneberg-Coburg

== See also ==
- List of margraves of Meissen
- Wettin (dynasty)

Frederick III of Thuringia House of Wettin Born: 14 December 1332 Died: 21 May 1381
Regnal titles
| Preceded by Frederick II | Landgrave of Thuringia (with William I and Balthasar); 1349–1381 | Succeeded by Balthasar |
| Preceded by Frederick II | Margrave of Meissen (with William I and Balthasar); 1349–1381 | Succeeded by Partitioned among his sons |
