= Division of Chemnitz =

The Division of Chemnitz settled the succession in the Landgraviate of Thuringia.

After the death of Frederick the Severe, Margrave of Meissen and Landgrave of Thuringia, the five heirs of the House of Wettin decided to divide the country. On 13 November 1382 they met in Chemnitz (probably at the local Benedictine monastery) and divided the land among themselves as follows:

First Part - Balthasar, brother of the deceased, received much of the Landgraviate of Thuringia: Wartburg, Eisenach, Creuzburg, Markgrafenstein, Salzungen, Lichtenberg, Tenneberg, Gotha, Wachsenburg Castle, Mehlis, Elgersburg, Schwarzwald, Liebenstein, Ballhausen, Grüningen, Weißensee, Tennstedt, Herbsleben, Salza, Thamsbrück, Bischofsgottern, Weimar, Eckartsberga, Finne, Neumark, Buttelstedt, the area around Erfurt, the bailiwick of Nordhausen, Wiehe, Schönwerda, Buttstädt, Sangerhausen, Grillenburg, Brandenburg, Großfurra, Brücken, Bendeleben, Rothenburg, Kyffhausen, Schlotheim, Treffurt, Breitenbach, the forest of Gerstungen, Beyernaumburg, Gebesee and Sittichenbach Abbey.

Second Part - William I the one-eyed, brother of the deceased, received the Margraviate of Meissen.

Third Part - Frederick I, the Belligerent, William II, the Rich and George, sons of the deceased (all three until 1390 under guardianship of their mother Catherine of Henneberg), received the Osterland, Landsberg, Pleissnerland, Orlamünde, Kahla, Jena and Naumburg.

Freiberg was to be ruled jointly.

After the death of William I the one-eyed in 1407 the Margraviate of Meissen was inherited by his nephews Frederick I the Belligerent and William II the Rich.
