= Battle of Sellnitz =

Coordinates: 50°31′34″N 13°43′35″E

- Part of Post-Hussite Wars
Date	23 September 1438
Location	Sellnitz, Bohemia
Result	Imperial victory

Belligerents
Electorate of Saxony; Kingdom of Germany; Hetman's forces of region Litoměřice and Žatec	Hussites of Žatec and Louny; Polish allies

Commanders and leaders
Jakoubek of Vřesovice; Frederick II of Saxony	Petr Holický (POW); Svojše of Zahrádka (POW)

Casualties and losses
Unknown	500 killed 1,657 prisoners Hermann Hallwich: 2,000 killed 2,000 prisoners

The Battle of Sellnitz was fought on 23 September 1438 between the Imperial Saxons and the Hussites. The Saxons were led by Frederick II of Saxony. On his journey to Saxony from Bohemia was accompanied by czech noble Jakoubek of Vřesovice, the former hussite leader (hetman) of the Union of Žatec and Louny, now hetman of the region Litoměřice and Žatec. During their journey they clashed with the hussite army of the Union of Žatec and Louny led by several nobles strengthened by 300 Polish cavalrymen. Jakoubek tried to negotiate with his former companions, but failed. The Saxons won the battle; about 2,000 Hussites were killed, and again as many taken prisoner.

According to the Želenice Chronicle, the battle took place at the foot of Želenice Hill. The chronicle states, among other things, that in 1923 a farmer found several relatively well-preserved weapons and coins from that time while ploughing. However, the location of the battle is disputable, because according to Palacký Jakoubek "pulled ... beyond the Bílina", i.e. the battle could have taken place on the other side of the river.

== Bibliography ==
- Schlesinger, Ludwig. The battle at Sellnitz (1438). Narrative of the Association for the History of Germans in Bohemia, Vol. 20 (1882), pp. 1-61
