= Battle of Brüx =

Hussite Wars battle in 1421

Coordinates: 50°31′16″N 13°38′12″E

- Part of Hussite Wars
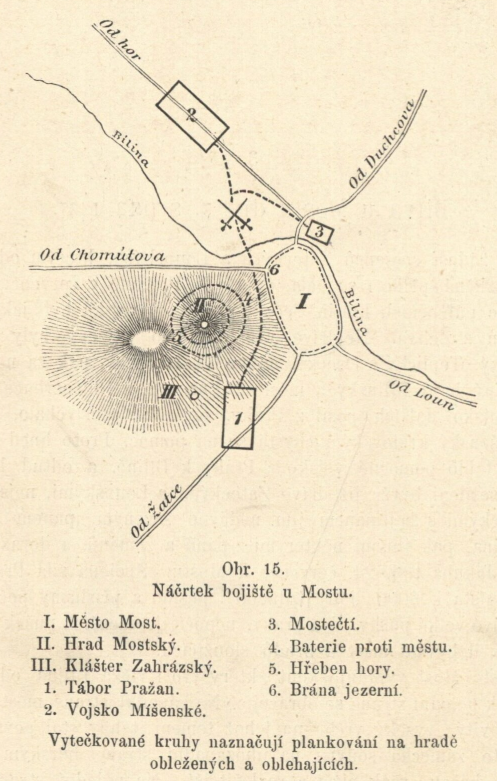
- Battle of Most (1421) - battlefield plan
Date	5 August 1421
Location	Brüx, Bohemia
Result	Catholic victory

Belligerents
Margravate of Meissen; Bohemian Catholic nobility	Hussite coalition: Praguers; Union of Žatec and Louny

Commanders and leaders
Frederick of Meissen: William of Brunswick-Lüneburg	Jan Želivský

Casualties and losses
1,000	1,000

The Battle of Brüx was fought on 5 August 1421 in North Bohemia during the Hussite Wars. The Hussite troops, led by Jan Želivský, were defeated by the Catholic Imperial forces of Frederick I of Saxony.

== Battle ==
On 16 March 1421, the Hussite troops under the command of Jan Žižka had stormed the town of Chomutov, located a few kilometers west of Brüx, and killed its approximately 2,500 inhabitants. They then went to Prague, causing extensive damage in the towns populated by Germans or Catholics. In early July, the Hussites headed north, this time led by the priest Jan Želivský, pillaging the passing Teplice and Duchcov, and on July 12 seized Bílina. Two weeks later, they set up a Wagenburg (fortress formed by wagons) in the village of Saras and from there launched attacks against Brüx, until they were defeated on 5 August by forces sent by Frederick of Saxony and supported by the Brüx neighbors.

== Aftermath ==
The victory of the Imperial-Catholic had no major impact on the further development of the Hussite wars since the Hussites retained military superiority over the following years. However, this success meant Frederick I of Saxony was elevated to the rank of Duke and Elector, while Želivský was removed from command shortly after and executed in March 1422. Despite the defeat, it did not cease altogether attacks from the Hussites against the territories of Saxony and Meissen so that they could not provide military support to the emperor Sigismund.

== Tradition ==
Since 1421, the city of Brüx, now called Most, holds a festival every year in thanks for deliverance from the Hussites. This tradition continued even after their expulsions in 1945–46 outside of the home to this day. This custom is one of the traditions from the Hussite wars to live on to the present day.
