= Adolf I (archbishop of Mainz) =

Archbishop and Elector of Mainz from 1381–1390

Adolf I von Nassau
- Archbishop of Mainz
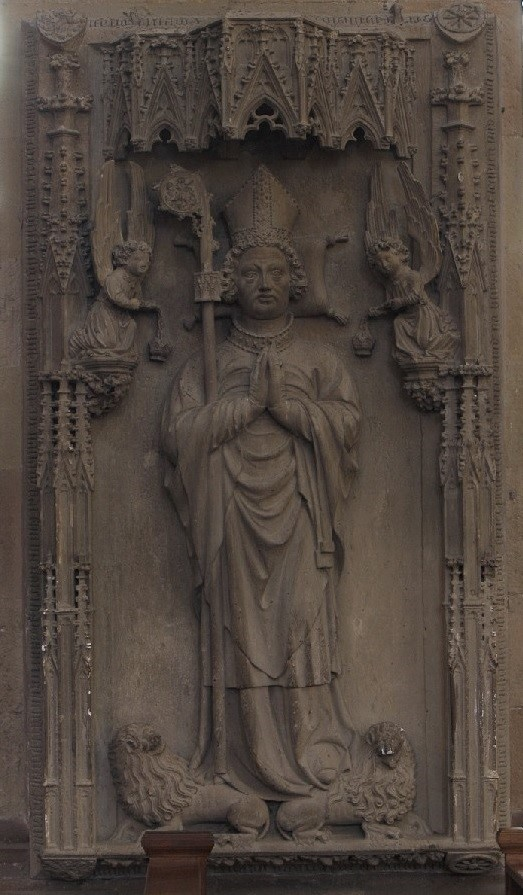
- Cenotaph of Adolf I of Nassau in Mainz Cathedral
- Church: Catholic Church
- Archdiocese: Archdiocese of Mainz
- In office: 18 April 1739 – 6 February 1390
- Predecessor: Louis of Meissen
- Successor: Konrad II. von Weinsberg
- Previous post: Bishop of Speyer (1371-1379)

Orders
- Consecration: 8 September 1371

Personal details
- Born: Adolf von Nassau-Wiesbaden-Idstein; 1353
- Died: 6 February 1390 (aged 36–37) Heilbad Heiligenstadt, Prince-Archbishopric of Mainz, Holy Roman Empire
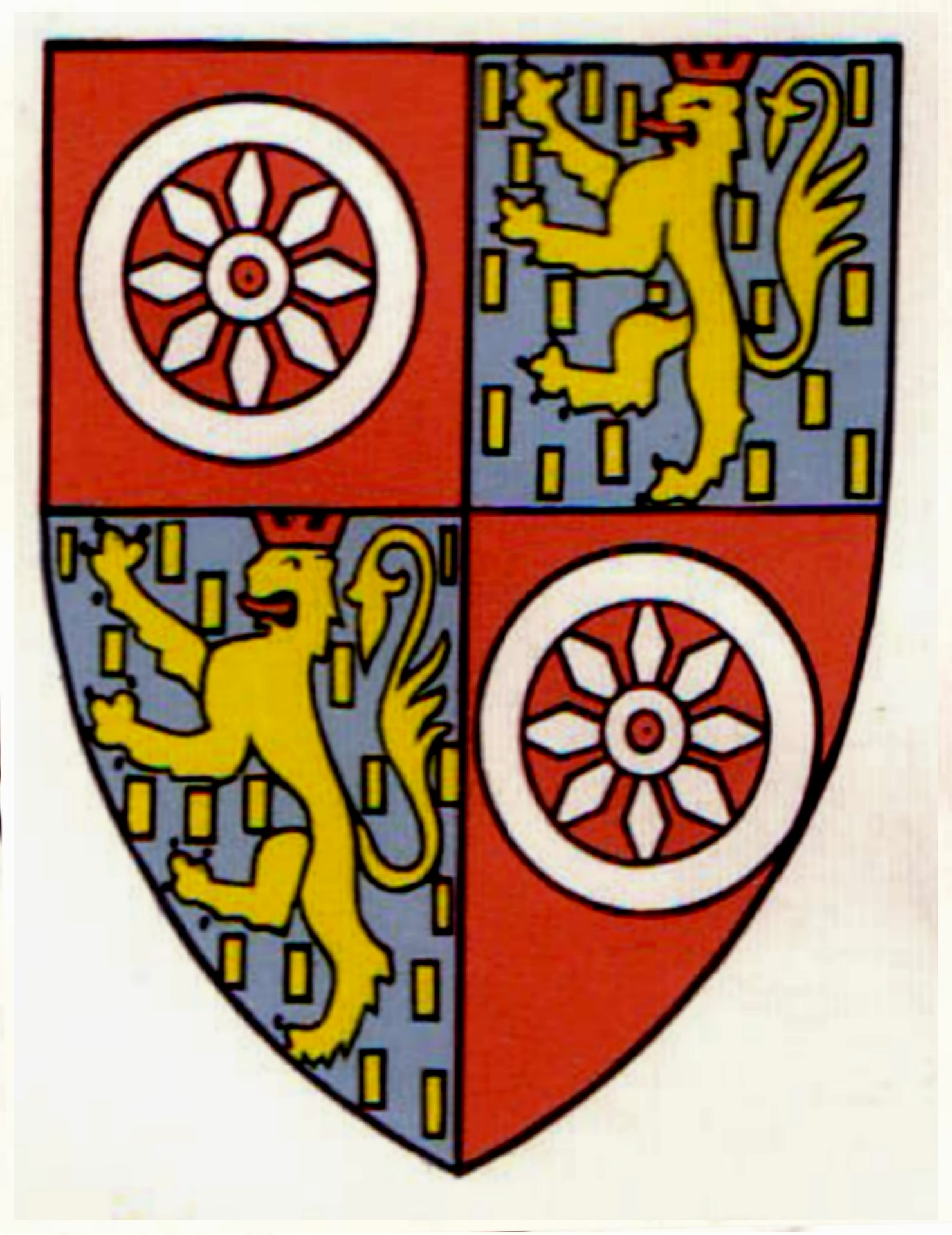
- Coat of arms

Adolf I von Nassau (born Adolf von Nassau-Wiesbaden-Idstein, c. 1353 – 6 February 1390) was Bishop of Speyer 1371–1388 and Archbishop of Mainz 1381–1390.

== Life ==
Adolf was born c. 1353 as son of Count Adolf I, the Count of Nassau-Wiesbaden-Idstein. His great-grandfather was Adolf, King of the Romans. When his uncle, Archbishop of Mainz Gerlach von Nassau died in 1371, he was chosen by the Cathedral chapter as his successor against Kuno II von Falkenstein; however, he had to yield to Johann von Luxemburg-Ligny, the preferred candidate of Emperor Charles IV, who was appointed by Pope Gregory XI. Adolf was made Bishop of Speyer instead, a position freed up because Lamprecht of Brunn moved from Speyer to the previous position of Johann and became Bishop of Strasbourg. When Johann died in 1373, the Mainz Cathedral chapter again supported Adolf, but on the request of Emperor Charles IV, Gregory XI appointed Louis of Meissen. However, Adolf had actual control over most of the Electorate of Mainz. After the death of Gregory XI, Adolf used the Western Schism and had himself confirmed by the Avignon pope Clement VII. In 1381, Adolf was accepted as archbishop of Mainz also by the Roman pope Urban VI and by Charles IV's successor as King of the Germans, Wenceslaus IV.

During his reign, Adolf was in conflict with Rupert I, Elector Palatine, a supporter of the Roman papacy. Adolf used his position to further his family's territorial interests and to enlarge its power. On Adolf's initiative, the creation of the University of Erfurt was confirmed by Pope Urban VI in 1389. Adolf died on 6 February 1390 in Heiligenstadt. He is buried in Mainz Cathedral.
