= William II of Meissen =

William II, Margrave of Meissen
- Born: 23 April 1371
- Died: 13 March 1425 (aged 53)
- Spouse: Amelia of Masovia
- House: House of Wettin
- Father: Frederick III, Margrave of Meissen
- Mother: Catherine of Henneberg

Wilhelm II, the Rich (23 April 1371 – 13 March 1425) was the second son of Margrave Frederick the Strict of Meissen and Catherine of Henneberg.

Under the Division of Chemnitz of 1382, he received the Osterland and Landsberg jointly with his brothers, Frederick I, Elector of Saxony and George (d. 1402). When Margrave William I "the one-eyed" died in 1407, William and Frederick also inherited a part of Meissen. Under the 1410 Treaty of Naumburg, however, the brothers agreed to a fresh division of the Meissen territory. They agreed to divide the Osterland between themselves. They did so in 1411; William received the larger part of the Osterland, including Leipzig, which Frederick had managed to obtain instead of Jena.

William fought at his brother's side in the Hussite war in Bohemia. He is rumoured to have been married to Amelia of Masovia. According to Karlheinz Blaschke, however, he remained unmarried.

He died on 13 March 1425.

== Ancestors ==
Ancestors of William II of Meissen

16. Albert II, Margrave of Meissen
8. Frederick I, Margrave of Meissen
17. Margaret of Sicily
4. Frederick II, Margrave of Meissen
18. Hartmann XI, Count of Lobdeburg-Arnshaugk
9. Elizabeth of Lobdeburg-Arnshaugk
19. Elisabeth, Countess of Weimar-Orlamünde
2. Frederick III, Landgrave of Thuringia
20. Louis II, Duke of Bavaria
10. Louis IV, Holy Roman Emperor
21. Matilda of Habsburg
5. Mathilde of Bavaria
22. Bolko I the Strict
11. Beatrix of Silesia-Glogau
23. Beatrice of Brandenburg
1. William II, Margrave of Meissen
24. Berthold V, Count of Henneberg-Schleusingen
12. Berthold VII, Count of Henneberg-Schleusingen
25. Sophie of Schwarzburg
6. Henry IV of Henneberg-Schleusingen
26. Henry I, Landgrave of Hesse
13. Adelheid of Hesse
27. Adelheid of Brunswick-Lüneburg
3. Catherine of Henneberg
28. Otto V, Margrave of Brandenburg-Salzwedel
14. Herman, Margrave of Brandenburg-Salzwedel
29. Judith of Henneberg-Coburg
7. Judith of Brandenburg-Salzwedel
30. Albert I of Germany
15. Anna of Austria
31. Elisabeth of Gorizia-Tyrol

== References and sources ==
- Heinrich Theodor Flathe (1898). "Wilhelm II., Markgraf von Meißen" . Allgemeine Deutsche Biographie (in German). Vol. 43. Leipzig: Duncker & Humblot. p. 124.

William II of Meissen House of Wettin Born: 1371 Died: 30 March 1425
Preceded by William I	Margrave of Meissen; 1407–1425	Succeeded by Frederick I
