= Catherine of Henneberg =

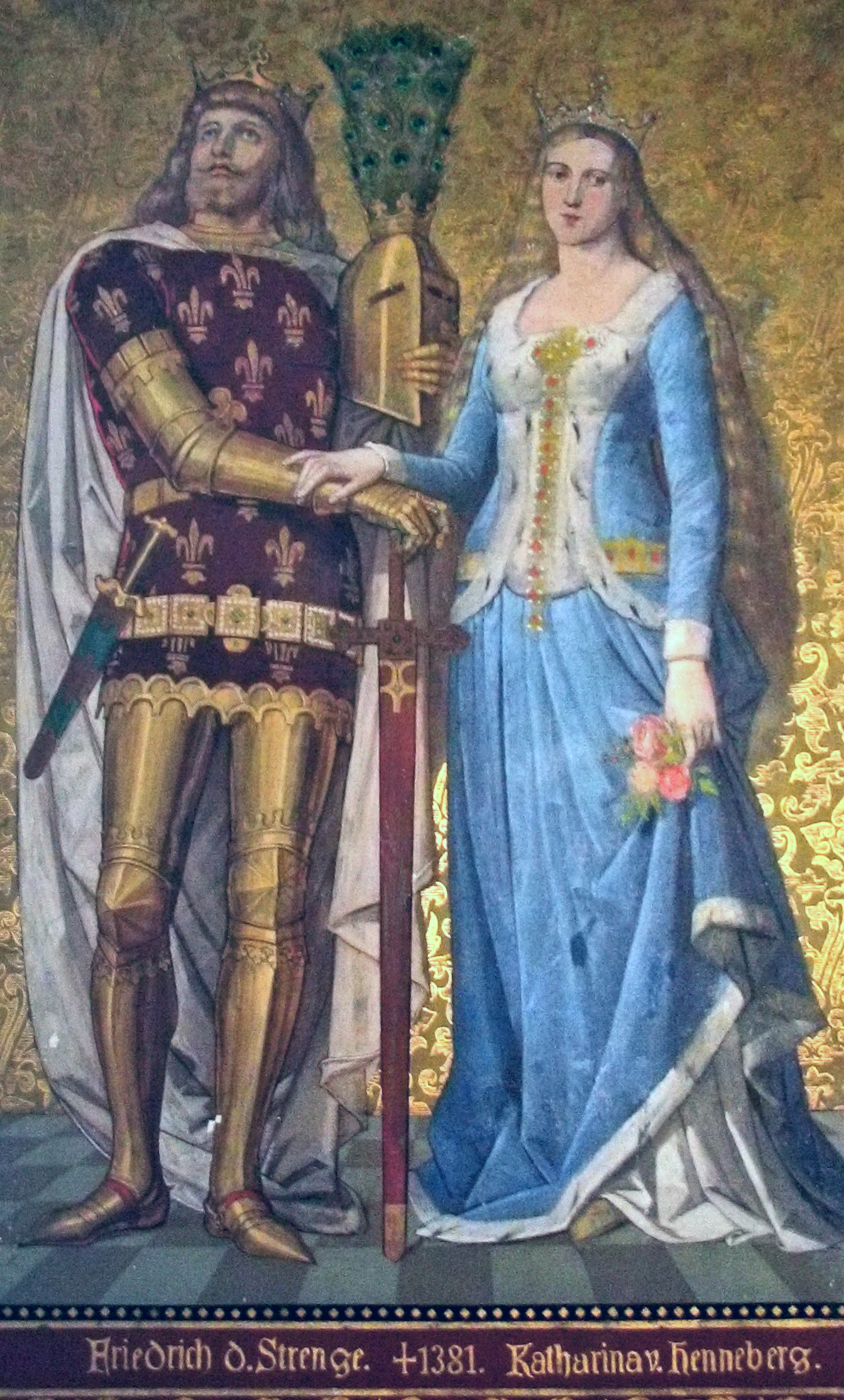
- Painting of Frederick III and Catherine in the Albrechtsburg in Meissen
- Born: c. 1334; Schleusingen
- Died: 15 July 1397; Meissen
- Spouse: Frederick III, Margrave of Meissen
- Issue: Frederick I, Elector of Saxony; William II, Margrave of Meissen; George of Meissen
- House: Henneberg
- Father: Henry IV of Henneberg-Schleusingen
- Mother: Judith of Brandenburg-Salzwedel

Catherine of Henneberg (German: Katharina von Henneberg; c. 1334 – 15 July 1397) was a Countess of Henneberg by birth and, from 1347, Margravine of Meissen and Landgravine of Thuringia by marriage. She was the wife of Frederick the Severe of the House of Wettin. Through her, the Wettins inherited her family's Franconian possessions.

== Life ==
Catherine was the second of four daughters of Count Henry IV of Henneberg-Schleusingen and his wife Judith of Brandenburg-Salzwedel.

During the transition of the Coburg region from the Henneberg family to the House of Wettin, there were complications. The testament of Henry IV gave the "new Lordship" part of his wife's territory as inheritance to his wife and his daughters and gave the rest of the former County of Henneberg to his brother John. Thus the Henneberg property was split. One consequence of the female succession was that after Henry IV's death in 1347, his sons-in-law could not inherit immediately; it became possible only after Judith of Brandenburg died on 1 February 1353. Only eight days later, on 9 February 1353, Margrave Frederick appeared at the court of Emperor Charles IV in Prague, to be enfeoffed with the territory around Coburg.

The complicated inheritance rules did not match the expectations of Catherine's father-in-law Frederick the Serious. This is reflected in an episode in a surviving chronicle, which relates how Catherine was sent back home when her dowry failed to be delivered. Another tradition says that after her first-born son died early, Catherine wore only black clothes and renounced all jewelry until her next son was born. Both stories are probably legends, but they do point to two unusual circumstances: the unusual succession, and the 20-year waiting period between her marriage and the birth of her heir. Between 1370 and 1380, she gave birth to three surviving sons:

- Frederick I, Elector of Saxony (1370–1428)
- William II, Margrave of Meissen (1371–1425)
- George (died 1402)

=== Regent ===
When her husband died in 1381, her sons were still minors. In accordance with her late husband's will, Catherine took up their guardianship and ruled until her death both her own territory of Coburg and Weißenfels (which she had received as jointure from her husband) and jointly with her sons the territories along the middle Saale and between the Saale and Mulde, which they had received at the division of Chemnitz of 1382.

As Landgravine of Thuringia and Margravine of Meissen she has sealed many deeds and she kept her own seal for that purpose. She took her widow's seat in Coburg, where her mother, Judith of Brandenburg, also lived. She had stayed there often during her husband's lifetime, as he had to travel frequently.

Catherine is also remembered because she commissioned Heinrich von Vippach's Fürstenspiegel Katherina divina.
