= Amelia of Masovia =

Polish princess

Amelia of Masovia (pl: Amelia mazowiecka; 1397–98 – after 17 May 1434), was a Polish princess member from the Masovian branch of the House of Piast.

She was the fourth daughter of Siemowit IV, Duke of Masovia, and Alexandra, a daughter of Algirdas, Grand Duke of Lithuania, and sister of King Władysław II Jagiełło of Poland.

== Life ==
In 1407 William II, Margrave of Meissen asked her hand in marriage. The wedding by proxy took place on 16 May 1413 at Brześć Kujawski. It is unknown when the marriage took place in person. They had no children.

After her husband's death on 13 March 1425, Amelia returned to Masovia. She was buried in either Płock Cathedral or a nearby Dominican convent.
