= Catherine of Brunswick-Lüneburg =

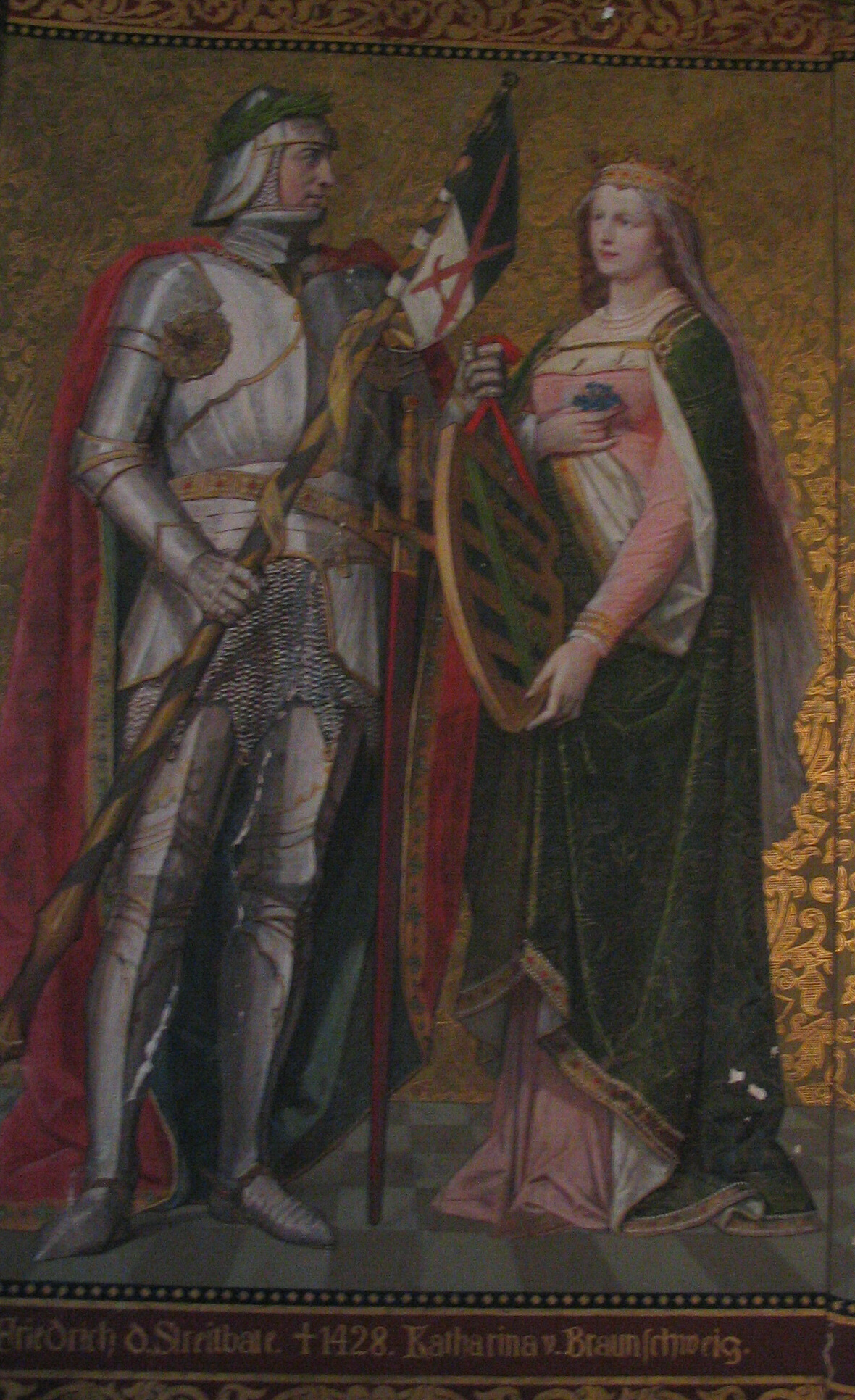
- Catherine and her husband Frederick I.

Electress consort of Saxony
- Tenure: 6 January 1423 – 4 January 1428
- Born: c. 1395
- Died: 28 December 1441 (aged 45–46); Grimma
- Burial: Cathedral Chapel in Meissen
- Spouse: Frederick I, Elector of Saxony
- Issue: Frederick II, Elector of Saxony; William III, Duke of Luxembourg
- House: House of Welf
- Father: Henry the Mild, Duke of Brunswick-Lüneburg
- Mother: Sophie of Pomerania

Catherine of Brunswick-Lüneburg (1395 – 28 December 1442, Grimma) was a member of the House of Welf, a princess of Brunswick-Lüneburg and by marriage, the Electress of Saxony.

== Life ==
Catherine was the only daughter and second child of the Duke Henry I of Brunswick-Lüneburg († 1416) from his first marriage to Sophie († June 1400), daughter of Duke Wartislaw VI of Pomerania.

As a 7-year-old she married on 7 February 1402 Margrave Frederick IV "the Warlike" of Meissen (1370–1428), who in 1425 became the first Elector of Saxony, as Frederick I. The elector lost a large part of his army in the Hussite Wars in 1421 in the Battle of Brüx. During Frederick's absence, Electress Catherine organized another army of 20,000 men, which rushed to Frederick's aid, but was defeated devastatingly in the Battle of Aussig in 1426.

Catherine spent time with her husband, but more frequently alone, at Mildenstein Castle in Leisnig, which thereby developed into a private residence of the Saxon Electors.

She is buried in the Princely Chapel in Meissen Cathedral.

== Offspring ==
From her marriage, Catherine had seven children:

1. Catherine, died young;
2. Frederick II, Elector of Saxony (1412–1464);
3. Sigismund, Bishop of Würzburg, (3 March 1416 – 24 December 1471);
4. Anna, (5 June 1420 – 17 September 1462), married to Louis I, Landgrave of Hesse;
5. Catherine, (1421 – 23 August 1476, Berlin), married to Frederick II, Elector of Brandenburg;
6. Henry, (21 May 1422 – 22 July 1435);
7. William III, Duke of Luxemburg (1425–1482), Landgrave of Thuringia, Duke of Luxemburg; married
  1. in 1446, Anne of Austria (1432–1462)
  2. in 1463, Catherine of Brandenstein († 1492)

Catherine of Brunswick-Lüneburg House of Welf Born: circa 1395 Died: 28 December 1442
Royal titles
Preceded by Euphemia of Silesia	Electress consort of Saxony; 1423–1428	Succeeded by Margaret of Austria
