= Louis of Meissen =

German nobleman and bishop

- Born: 25 February 1341; Wartburg
- Died: 17 February 1382 (aged 40); Calbe
- Buried: Cathedral of Magdeburg
- Noble family: House of Wettin
- Father: Frederick II, Margrave of Meissen
- Mother: Matilda of Bavaria

Louis of Meissen (25 February 1341 – 17 February 1382) was a German nobleman from the House of Wettin. He was Bishop of Halberstadt and later Bishop of Bamberg, then Archbishop of Mainz and finally Archbishop of Magdeburg.

== Life ==
He was the fourth son of Margrave Frederick II of Meissen and his wife Matilda, the daughter of emperor Ludwig IV. On 1357, at the age of 17, Louis was appointed — probably because of his membership of the powerful House of Wettin — as Bishop of Halberstadt. In 1366 he resigned from this post when he was appointed Bishop of Bamberg by the King. In 1374, he resigned in Bamberg when he was appointed as Archbishop of Mainz. In 1381, he resigned in Mainz and was appointed Archbishop of Magdeburg.

After the death of Archbishop John of Mainz in 1373, the cathedral chapter of Mainz elected Adolph I of Nassau as administrator of the archbishopric. However, at the request of Emperor Charles IV, pope Gregory XI refused to confirm his election and appointed Louis of Meissen instead. This led to an armed conflict, known as the Schism of Mainz. Battles were fought in Thuringia and the Eichsfeld. Louis was supported by the Emperor and his son Wenceslaus, by his three brothers and by Landgrave Henry II of Hesse. Adolph of Nassau was supported by Duke Otto I of Brunswick-Göttingen, Count John I of Nassau-Siegen, Count Henry VI of Waldeck and Count Gottfried VIII of Ziegenhain. Neither side was strong enough to force a victory, and the conflict lasted until 1381.

After Gregory XI died in 1378, the Western church was divided by two rival popes, a conflict known as the Western Schism. The Antipope Clement VII confirmed the election of Adolph as administrator of Mainz in 1379 and appointed Adolph as administrator of Speyer in 1380. When King Wenceslaus subsequently confirmed Adolph's appointment, Louis abdicated as Archbishop of Mainz, and was given the Archbishopric of Magdeburg as compensation. He travelled to Magdeburg. However, he died in February 1382 and was buried in the Cathedral of Magdeburg.

Louis of Meissen House of Wettin Born: 25 February 1341 Died: 17 February 1382
Preceded by Albert II of Brunswick-Lüneburg	Prince-Bishop of Halberstadt; 1357–1366	Succeeded by Albert of Rickmersdorf
Preceded by Frederick II of Truhendingen	Prince-Bishop of Bamberg; 1366–1374	Succeeded by Lamprecht of Brunn
Preceded by John of Luxembourg-Ligny	Prince-Elector of Mainz; 1374–1381	Succeeded by Adolph of Nassau-Wiesbaden-Idstein
Preceded by Peter Jelito	Archbishop of Magdeburg; 1381–1382	Succeeded by Frederick II of Hoym
