= List of margraves of Meissen =

Margraves of Meissen

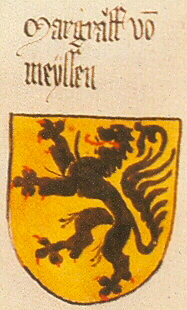
Coat of arms of the Margraves of Meissen, Ingeram Codex (1459)

This article lists the margraves of Meissen, a march and territorial state on the eastern border of the Holy Roman Empire.

== History ==
King Henry the Fowler, on his 928–29 campaign against the Slavic Glomacze tribes, had a fortress erected on a hill at Meissen (Mišno) on the Elbe river. Later named Albrechtsburg, the castle about 965 became the seat of the Meissen margraves, installed by Emperor Otto I when the vast Marca Geronis (Gero's march) was partitioned into five new margraviates, including Meissen, the Saxon Eastern March, and also the Northern March which eventually became the Margraviate of Brandenburg.

During the tenth century, the Meissen margraves temporarily extended their territory into the Milceni lands up to the Kwisa (Queis) river and the border with the Silesian region of the Early Polish state. The eastern lands around Bautzen (Budissin), later known as Upper Lusatia, were ceded to the Polish duke Bolesław I the Brave according to the 1018 Peace of Bautzen; in 1076 they passed to the Duke of Bohemia as an Imperial fief.

From 1089, the Meissen margravial title became the honor of the Saxon House of Wettin and remained as the dynasty's possession ever since. In the 13th century the Meissen margraves acquired the former Pleissnerland territory and upon the War of the Thuringen Succession 1247–1264 also the adjacent Landgraviate of Thuringia in the west. Finally in 1423 Margrave Frederick the Warlike was enfeoffed with the Saxe–Wittenberg lands down the Elbe ('Upper Saxony'), an electorate according to the Golden Bull of 1356. While the Wettin rulers eventually moved their residence to Dresden, the Meissen margraviate merged into their electorate and became known as the 'Cradle of Saxony'.

== List ==
Affiliation	Name	Years	Comments
	Wigbert	965–970	Received the Meissen territory upon the death of Margrave Gero
	Thietmar	970–979	Son of Count Christian of Serimunt, also Margrave of Merseburg
Ekkeharding	Gunther of Merseburg	981–982	also Margrave of Merseburg
	Rikdag	979–985	since 982 also Margrave of Merseburg, removes Wigger in Zeitz, Gunther in Merseburg and Wigbert in Meißen as Margrave
Ekkeharding	Eckard I	985–1002	Son of Gunther of Merseburg
Ekkeharding	Gunzelin	1002–1009	
Ekkeharding	Herman I	1009–1031	
Ekkeharding	Eckard II	1031–1046	
Weimar-Orlamünde	William	1046–1062	
Weimar-Orlamünde	Otto I	1062–1067	Died without male heirs
Brunonen	Egbert I	1067–1068	
Brunonen	Egbert II	1068–1089	Revolted against King Henry IV in 1076
Přemyslid	Vratislaus II of Bohemia	1076–1089	Enfeoffed by King Henry IV in turn for his support, though never confirmed
Wettin	Henry I	1089–1103	Son of Margrave Dedi I of the Saxon Ostmark, first Wettin ruler
Wettin	Thimo	1103	
Wettin	Henry II	1104–1123	
	Wiprecht	1123–1124	
Winzenburg	Herman II	1124–1130	
Wettin	Conrad	1130–1156	
Wettin	Otto II	1156–1190	
Wettin	Albert I	1190–1195	Followed by the direct rule of the Emperor Henry VI
Wettin	Dietrich I	1198–1221	
Wettin	Henry III	1221–1288	
Wettin	Albert II	1288	Son of Henry III the Illustrious
Wettin	Frederick I	1291–1323	
Nassau	Adolf	1293–1298	
Habsburg	Albert III	1298–1307	
Wettin	Frederick II	1323–1349	Son of Frederick I the Peaceful
Wettin	Frederick III	1349–1381	Son of Frederick II the Serious
Wettin	Balthasar	1349–1382	Son of Frederick II the Serious
Wettin	William I	1349–1407	Son of Frederick II the Serious
Wettin	George	1381–1402	Son of Frederick III the Strict
Wettin	William II	1381–1425	Son of Frederick III the Strict
Wettin	Frederick IV	1381–1428	Son of Frederick III the Strict
Wettin	Frederick V	1407–1440	Son of Balthasar, heir of William I

== As a title in pretense ==
After the abolition of all German monarchies in 1918 and the death of Friedrich August III, the last king of Saxony, in 1932, further heads of the house and pretenders to the throne have used the title Margrave of Meissen.

- Friedrich Christian, Margrave of Meissen
- Maria Emanuel, Margrave of Meissen
- Albert, Margrave of Meissen, disputed with Alexander
- Alexander, Margrave of Meissen, disputed with Albert and Ruediger
- Rüdiger, Margrave of Meissen, disputed with Alexander
- Daniel, Margrave of Meissen, disputed with Alexander

== See also ==
- List of rulers of Thuringia
- List of rulers of Saxony
