= Constance of Austria, Margravine of Meissen =

Margravine of Meissen

Constance of Babenberg
- Margravine of Meissen
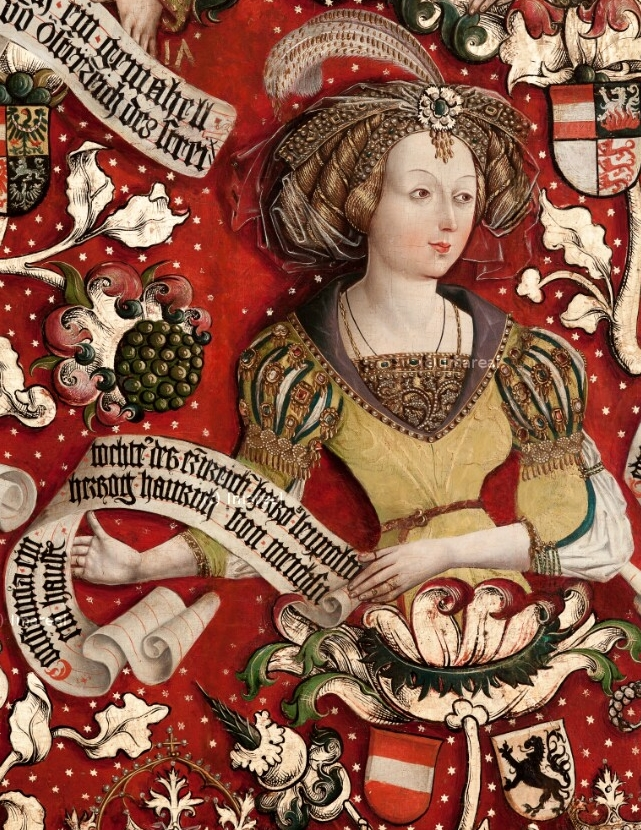
- Portrait in the Babenberg pedigree, Klosterneuburg Monastery
- Born: 6 May 1212
- Died: before 5 June 1243
- Noble family: House of Babenberg
- Spouse: Henry III, Margrave of Meissen
- Issue: Albert II, Margrave of Meissen; Theodoric of Landsberg
- Father: Leopold VI, Duke of Austria
- Mother: Theodora Angelina

Constance of Babenberg (German: Konstanze von Österreich; 6 May 1212 – before 5 June 1243), a member of the House of Babenberg, was Margravine of Meissen from 1234 until her death, by her marriage with Margrave Henry the Illustrious.

== Life ==
Constance was a younger daughter of Duke Leopold VI of Austria and his wife, the Byzantine princess Theodora Angelina, granddaughter of Emperor Alexios III Angelos. In 1225 her elder sister Margaret married the 14-year-old Henry (VII), King-elect of Germany and eldest son of the Hohenstaufen emperor Frederick II. Upon her father's death in 1230, the Babenberg duchies of Austria and Styria passed to her brother Frederick the Quarrelsome.

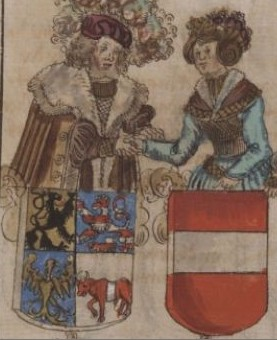
Margrave Henry and Constance, from the chronicles by George Spalatin, 16th century

On 1 May 1234 Constance married the Wettings margrave Henry the Illustrious. The wedding took place in an open field near Vienna rather than in the newly erected Hofburg residence of the Babenberg's. It is believed that the conversion of the castle had not been completed, or perhaps it was too small. There are three sources for information about the wedding itself. Two of them report that the wedding happened in campo inuxta Stadelowe, in other words, in Stadlau. The third source reports that the wedding took place in aput Ringlense, a name which has fallen into disuse and was used instead of today's Floridsdorf.

The two sources reporting the location as Stadlau also published a list of wedding guests. Present at the wedding were King Wenceslaus I of Bohemia and Prince Béla IV of Hungary, the Archbishop of Salzburg as well as the bishops of Passau, Bamberg, Freising and Seckau. The secular princes were represented by Margrave Přemysl of Moravia, Duke Albert of Saxony, Duke Carinthia, the Carinthian duke Bernhard von Spanheim, and the Landgrave of Thuringia. This guest list suggests the importance of the Babenberg dukes within the Holy Roman Empire.

Constance bequeathed a True Cross relic to the Dresden parish, housed by a chapel which later became known as the Kreuzkirche. Her husband, who had inherited both the Margraviate of Meissen and the March of Lusatia from his father, the late Margrave Theodoric I, participated in a Prussian Crusade of the Teutonic Order soon after their wedding. In 1239 he entered into the Teltow and Magdeburg Wars with the Ascanian margraves of Brandenburg. He remained a loyal supporter of Emperor Frederick II, who betrothed his daughter Margaret of Sicily with Henry's and Constance's first-born son Albert.

After Constance's death in 1243, Margrave Henry secondly married Agnes of Bohemia, a daughter of King Wenceslaus I. When Constance's brother Duke Frederick was killed in the 1246 Battle of the Leitha River, he claimed the Austrian duchy for himself; nevertheless, it was seized by Emperor Frederick II.

== Issue ==
Henry and Constance had two sons:

- Albert II, Margrave of Meissen (1240 – 20 November 1314)
- Theodoric of Landsberg (1242 – 8 February 1285).

In 1910, a street in Donaustadt (the 22nd district of Vienna), was named after her: Konstanziagasse.
