= Frederick I, Elector of Saxony =

Elector of Saxony from 1423 to 1428

Frederick I
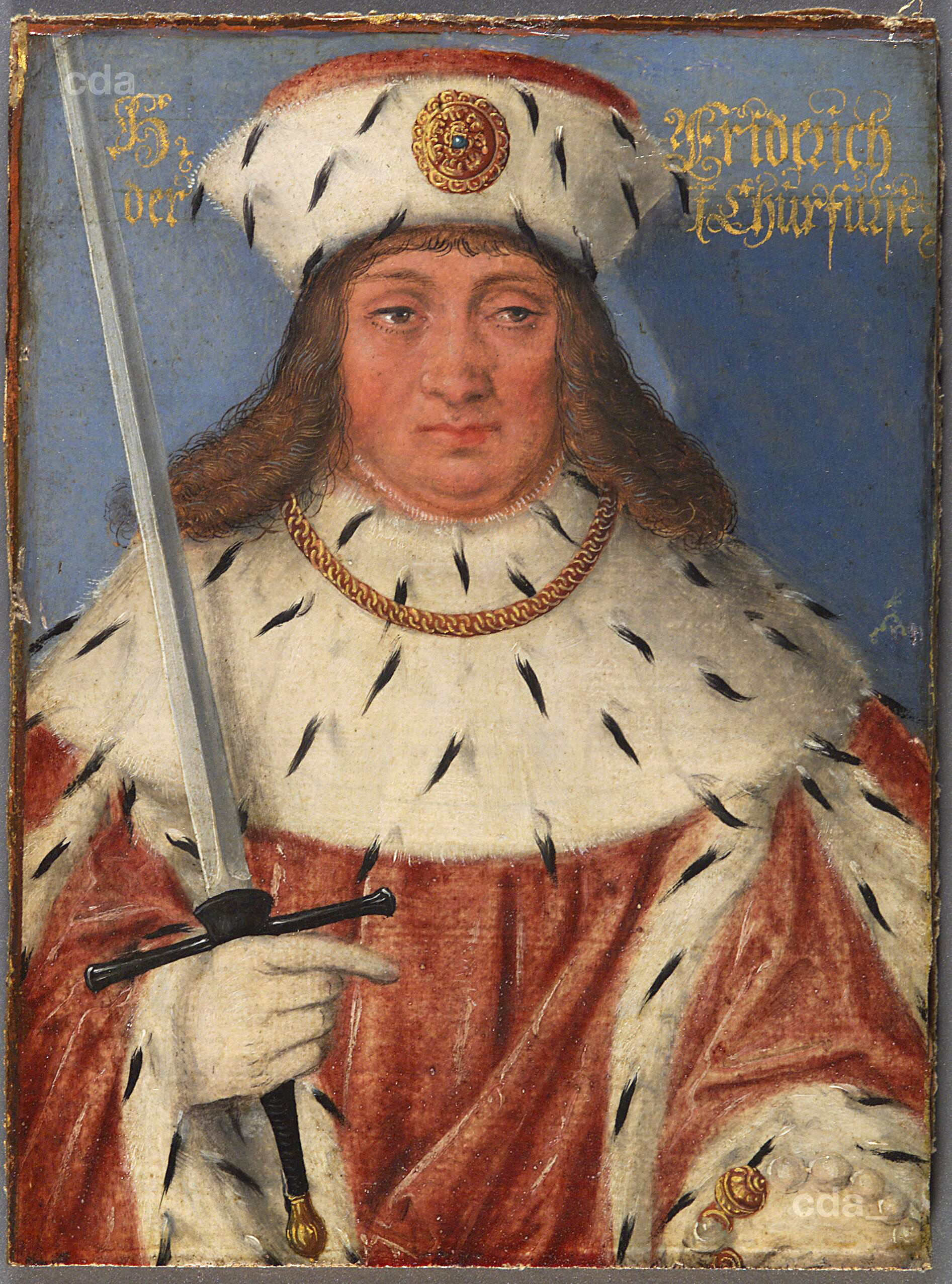
- Portrait by Lucas Cranach the Younger

Elector of Saxony
- Reign: 6 January 1423 – 4 January 1428
- Predecessor: Albert III
- Successor: Frederick II

Margrave of Meissen
- Reign: 9 February 1407 – 4 January 1428
- Predecessor: William I
- Successor: Frederick II
- Born: 11 April 1370; Dresden, Margravate of Meissen, Holy Roman Empire
- Died: 4 January 1428 (aged 57); Altenburg, Electorate of Saxony, Holy Roman Empire
- Burial: Princes Chapel in Meissen Cathedral
- Spouse: Catherine of Brunswick-Lüneburg
- Issue among others...: Frederick II, Elector of Saxony; Anna, Landgravine of Hesse; William III, Duke of Luxembourg
- House: Wettin
- Father: Frederick III, Landgrave of Thuringia
- Mother: Catherine of Henneberg

Frederick I, the Belligerent or the Warlike (German: Friedrich der Streitbare; 11 April 1370 – 4 January 1428), a member of the House of Wettin, ruled as Margrave of Meissen from 1407 and as Elector of Saxony (Frederick I) from 1423 until his death. He secured the Saxon electorship for the House of Wettin, thereby establishing the dynasty's future importance in German politics.

He is not to be confused with his cousin, Landgrave Frederick IV of Thuringia, the son of Landgrave Balthasar.

== Biography ==
He was the eldest son of Frederick III, Landgrave of Thuringia, and Catherine of Henneberg. After the death of his uncle William I, Margrave of Meissen in 1407, he was made governor of the Margraviate of Meissen together with his brother William II as well as with his cousin Frederick IV (son of Balthasar), until their possessions were divided in 1410 and 1415.

In the German town war of 1388, he assisted Frederick V of Hohenzollern, burgrave of Nuremberg, and in 1391 did the same for the Teutonic Order against Wladislaus II of Poland. He supported Rupert III, Elector Palatine of the Rhine, in his struggle with King Wenceslaus for the German throne, probably because Wenceslaus refused to fulfill a promise to give him his sister Anna in marriage.

The danger to Germany from the Hussites induced Frederick to ally himself with Emperor Sigismund; and he took a leading part in the war against them, during the earlier years of which he met with considerable success. For his victory at the Battle of Brüx in 1421, Frederick was granted the ranks of Duke and Elector. In the prosecution of this enterprise Frederick spent large sums of money, for which he received various places in Bohemia and elsewhere in pledge from Sigismund, who further rewarded him on 6 January 1423 with the vacant electoral Duchy of Saxony-Wittenberg; and Fredericks formal investiture followed at Ofen on the 1 August 1425. Thus ascended Frederick IV, who called himself Frederick I now as duke and elector. Thus spurred to renewed efforts against the Hussites, the elector was endeavouring to rouse the German princes to aid him in prosecuting this war when the Saxon army was almost annihilated at Aussig on the 16 August 1426.

After the death of his brother William, Frederick became the ruler over the entire possession of the House of Wettin except Thuringia.

In 1409, Frederick and his brother William founded the University of Leipzig, for the benefit of German students who had left the University of Prague after the events relating to the Western Schism.

Frederick died in 1428 at Altenburg. He was buried as the first Wettin in the centre of what is now known as the Princes Chapel in Meissen Cathedral. The cathedral is now accessible to the public for a small fee and the tomb is readily seen.

== Family ==
Frederick I married Catherine of Brunswick-Lüneburg (d. 1442), daughter of Henry the Mild, Duke of Brunswick-Lüneburg, on 7 February 1402. They had seven children:

1. Catherine, died young;
2. Frederick II, Elector of Saxony (1412–1464);
3. Sigismund, Bishop of Würzburg (3 March 1416 – 24 December 1471);
4. Anna (5 June 1420 – 17 September 1462), married Louis I, Landgrave of Hesse;
5. Catherine (1421 – 23 August 1476, Berlin), married Frederick II, Elector of Brandenburg;
6. Henry (21 May 1422 – 22 July 1435);
7. William III, Duke of Luxemburg (1425–1482), Landgrave of Thuringia.

== Gallery ==
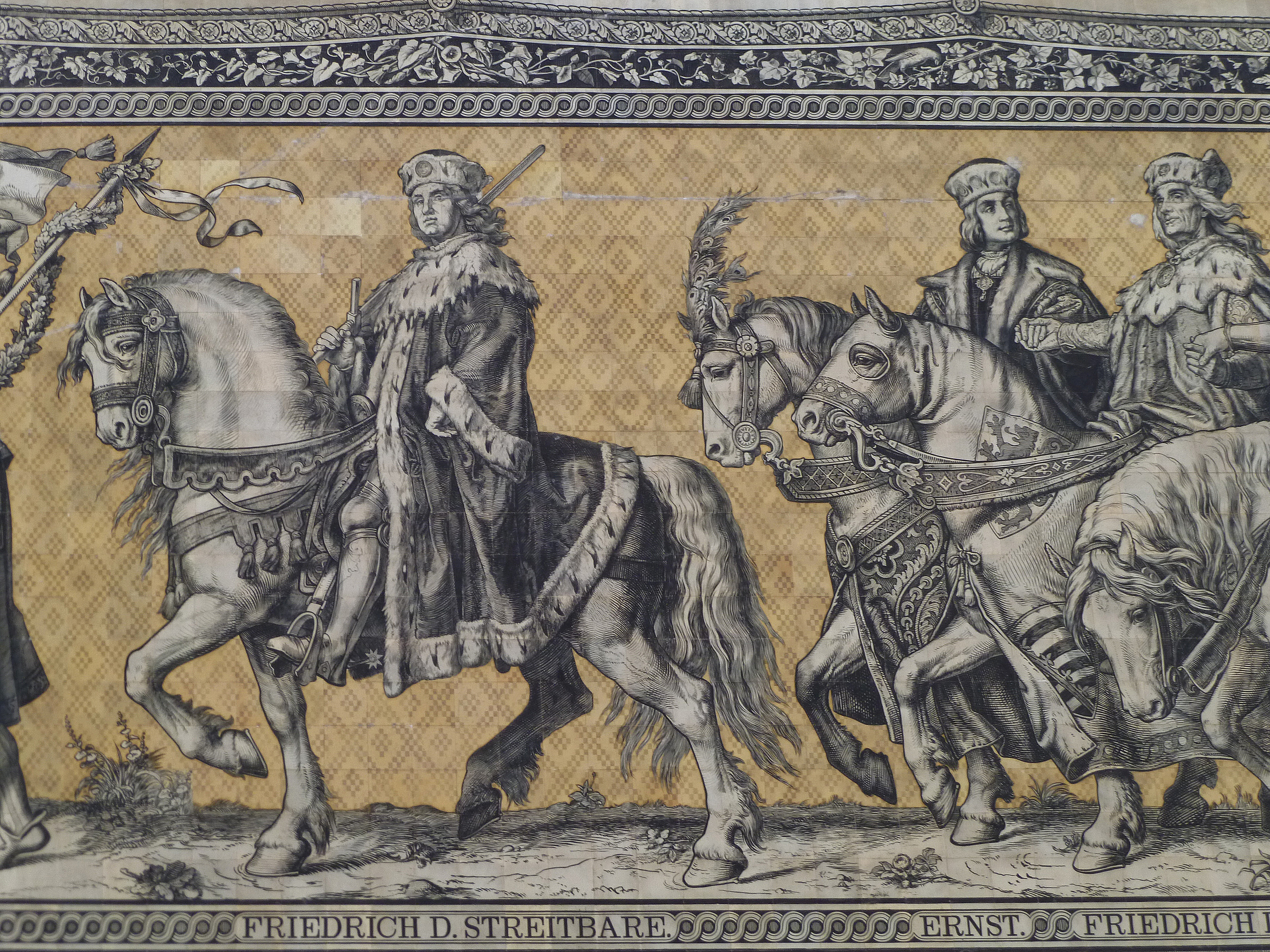
Frederick the Warlike (left) with Ernest and Frederick II, Fürstenzug, Dresden

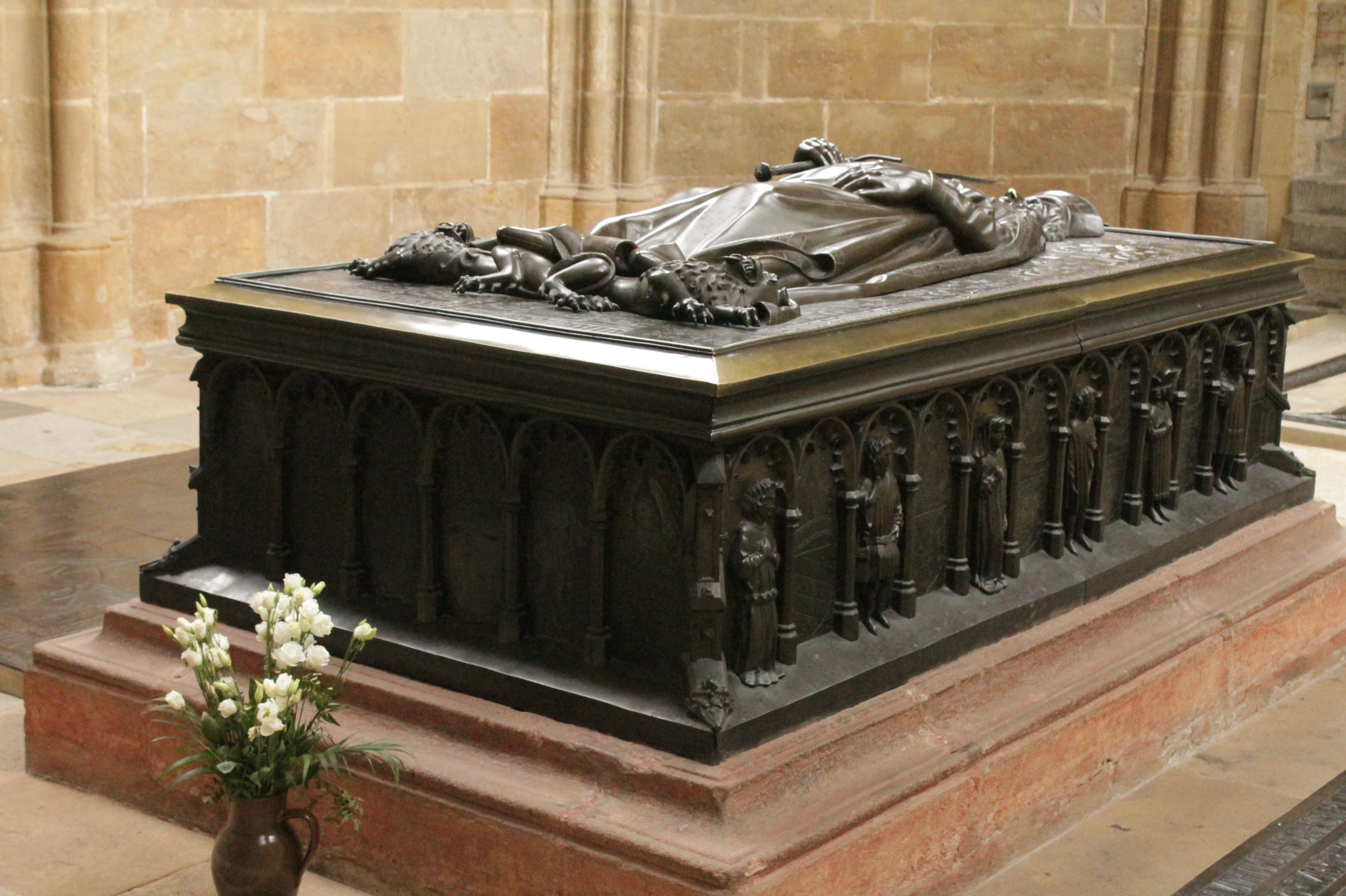
Tomb of Frederick I, Princes Chapel, Meissen Cathedral

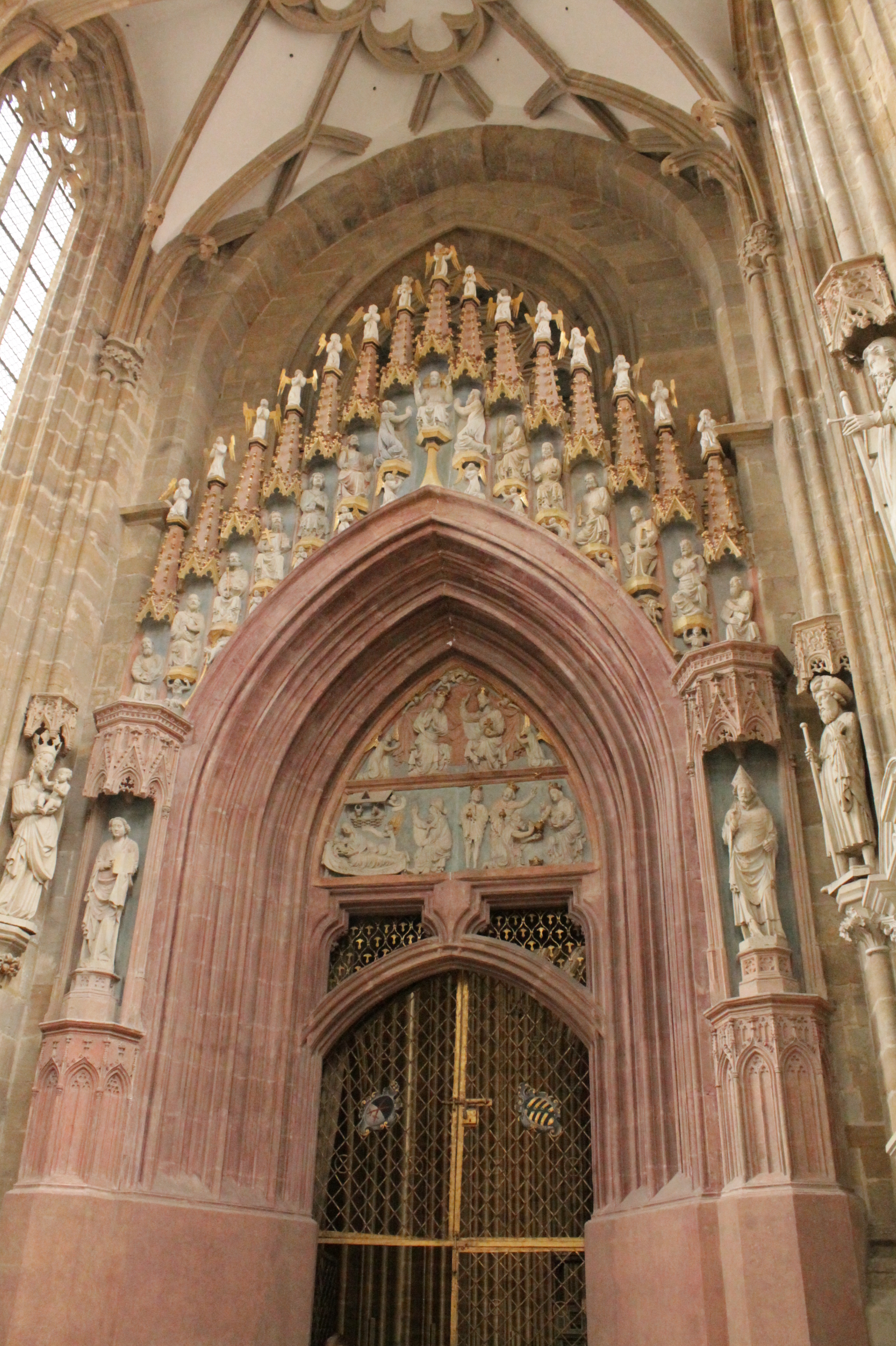
Portal to the Princes Chapel, Meissen Cathedral

Frederick I, Elector of Saxony House of Wettin Born: 11 April 1370 Died: 4 January 1428
Regnal titles
| Preceded by William I | Margrave of Meissen; 1407–1428; With: William II & Frederick the Peaceful | Succeeded by Frederick II |
| Preceded by Albert III | Elector of Saxony; 1423–1428 | Succeeded by Frederick II |
