= Matilda of Bavaria, Margravine of Meissen =

Daughter of Louis IV, Holy Roman Emperor

Matilde of Bavaria
- Margravine of Meissen
- Coat of arms of the House of Wittelsbach
- Born: aft. 21 June 1313; Bavaria, Germany
- Died: 2 July 1346 (aged 33); Meissen
- Spouse: Frederick II, Margrave of Meissen
- Issue Detail: Elisabeth, Burgravine of Nuremberg; Frederick III, Landgrave of Thuringia; Balthasar, Landgrave of Thuringia; Louis, Archbishop of Magdeburg; William I, Margrave of Meissen
- House: Wittelsbach
- Father: Louis IV, Holy Roman Emperor
- Mother: Beatrice of Silesia

Matilde of Bavaria (aft. 21 June 1313 – 2 July 1346) Meißen) was the eldest daughter of Louis IV, Holy Roman Emperor, and his first wife Beatrix of Świdnica. She was a member of the House of Wittelsbach.

== Family ==
Matilde's paternal grandparents were Louis II, Duke of Bavaria and his third wife Matilda of Habsburg. Her maternal grandparents were Bolko I the Strict and his wife Beatrice of Brandenburg. She had two brothers, Louis V, Duke of Bavaria and Stephen II, Duke of Bavaria. Matilde also had two sisters, Anna and Agnes, however they both died young so Matilde was the only surviving daughter.

In 1322, Matilde's mother died, so her father remarried to Margaret II, Countess of Hainault. Matilde gained ten half siblings off her stepmother, including: Louis VI the Roman, William I, Duke of Bavaria, Otto V, Duke of Bavaria, Albert I of Holland, Agnes of Bavaria and Beatrix of Bavaria.

== Marriage ==
Matilde married May 1323 in Nürnberg to Frederick II, Margrave of Meissen, son of Frederick I, Margrave of Meissen and had 9 children:

- Elisabeth (22 November 1329 – 21 April 1375), married to Friedrich V, Burgrave of Nuremberg.
- Frederick (born and died 1330)
- Frederick III the Strict
- Balthasar
- Beatrix (1 September 1339 – 15 July 1399), nun in Weißenfels
- Louis (25 February 1340 – 17 February 1382), (Bishop of Bamberg)
- William the One-eyed
- Anne (7 August 1345 – 22 March 1363), nun in Seußlitz
- Clara (born 7 August 1345)

Of the nine children born to Frederick and Matilde, six of them survived infancy. Matilde and Frederick did not get to see any of their children live to adulthood, Matilde died in Meißen on 2 July 1346, aged thirty three. Her husband died three years later, in 1349, aged thirty eight.

== Sources ==
- Mathilde von Wittelsbach
