= Frederick II of Meissen =

Frederick II
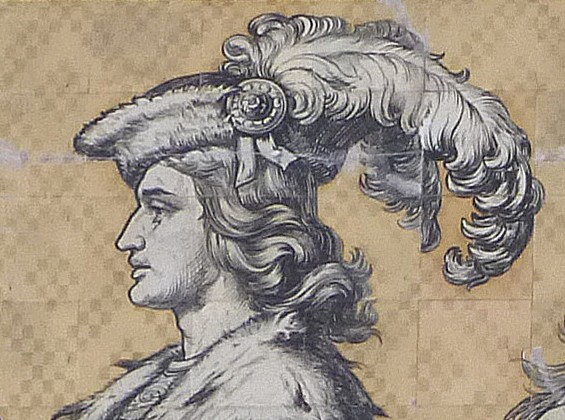

Margrave of Meissen Landgrave of Thuringia
- Reign: 1323–1349
- Predecessor: Frederick I
- Successor: Frederick III
- Born: 30 November 1310; Gotha, Duchy of Saxe-Wittenberg, Holy Roman Empire
- Died: 18 November 1349 (aged 38); Wartburg, Duchy of Saxe-Wittenberg, Holy Roman Empire
- Burial: Altzella Abbey
- Spouse: Mathilde of Bavaria
- Issue Detail: Elisabeth, Burgravine of Nuremberg; Frederick III, Landgrave of Thuringia; Balthasar, Landgrave of Thuringia; Louis, Archbishop of Magdeburg; William I, Margrave of Meissen
- House: Wettin
- Father: Frederick I, Margrave of Meissen
- Mother: Elisabeth von Lobdeburg-Arnshaugk

Frederick II (German: Friedrich; 30 November 1310 – 18 November 1349) was the margrave of Meissen from 1323 until his death.

== Early life ==
Frederick was born on 30 November 1310 in Gotha. His parents were Margrave Frederick I of Meissen and Elisabeth von Lobdeburg-Arnshaugk. In 1323, under the guardianship of his mother, he succeeded his father in the Margraviate of Meissen and Thuringia.

== Personal rule ==
After reaching the age of majority in 1329, Frederick faced prolonged conflicts with vassals and neighbouring lords. These disputes largely stemmed from his declaration of peace in 1338, which significantly curtailed the rights and influence of small landlords and local rulers, and was intended to bring those groups under tighter princely control.

In 1342, nobles concerned about the loss of their privileges and autonomy formed a league against him. They assembled at Arnstadt (southwest of Erfurt), a confrontation that became known as the Thuringian Count's War. The conflict continued until 1346.

After the death of Emperor Louis IV, the Bavarian faction sought to persuade Frederick to accept the German crown. He declined, mistrusting the uncertain loyalty of the electors, and supported Charles IV instead. Frederick focused on consolidating his territories and countering Charles's ambitions. At a meeting in Bautzen in 1348, both rulers acknowledged the existing territorial situation. Frederick died on 18 November 1349 at Wartburg.

== Family ==
Frederick II married in May 1323, in Nürnberg, to Mathilde of Bavaria, daughter of Louis IV, Holy Roman Emperor. They had nine children:

1. Elisabeth (22 November 1329 – 21 April 1375), married to Frederick V of Nuremberg.
2. Frederick (1330).
3. Frederick III, Landgrave of Thuringia.
4. Balthasar (1336–1406).
5. Beatrice (1 September 1339 – 15 July 1399), nun in Weißenfels.
6. Louis (25 February 1340 – 17 February 1382), Bishop of Bamberg.
7. William the One-eyed.
8. Anne (7 August 1345 – 22 March 1363), nun in Seußlitz.
9. Clara Elisabetta (born 7 August 1345).

== Sources ==
- Rogers, Clifford J. (2010). The Oxford Encyclopedia of Medieval Warfare and Military Technology, Volume 3. Oxford: Oxford University Press. p. 190. ISBN 978-0195334036.

Frederick II of Meissen House of Wettin Born: 30 November 1310 Died: 18 November 1349
Preceded by Frederick I	Margrave of Meissen; 1323–1349	Succeeded by Frederick III
