= Margravate of Meissen =

Medieval margraviate (965–1423)

Margraviate of Meissen Markgrafschaft Meißen (German)
- 965–1423 (1547)
- Top: Banner of arms Bottom: State colors flag (10th cent.–until 1423) Coat of arms

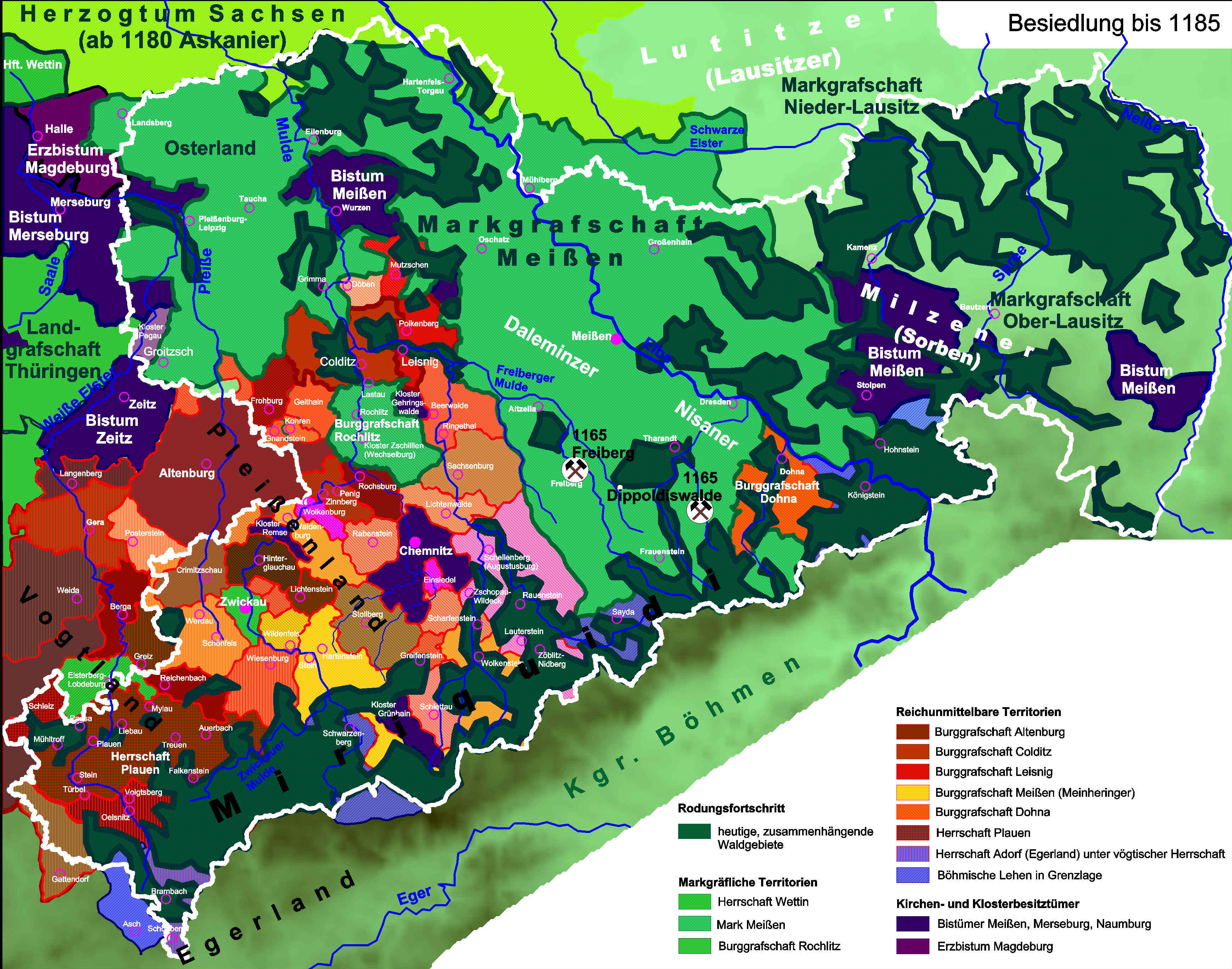
- March of Meissen (green) in the year 1185
- Status: Margraviate
- Capital: Meissen
- Common languages: Upper Saxon
- Government: Feudal monarchy
- Margrave of Meissen
  - 965–976: Wigbert (first)
  - 1381–1423: Frederick IV
- Historical era: Middle Ages
  - Partitioned from March of Gero I: 965
  - Captured by Poland: 1002
  - Investiture Controversy¹: 1067
  - War of Thuringian Succession: 1247–64
  - Acquired most of Thuringia: 1298
  - Battle of Lucka: 1307
  - Frederick IV assigned Saxe-Wittenberg: 1423 (1547)
  - Acquired Burggravate: 1426
| Preceded by | Succeeded by |
| March of Gero I | Electorate of Saxony |
- Today part of: Germany; Poland
- 1: As a result of the Investiture Controversy in 1067, the territory was lost from the Brunonen to the Wettin dynasty.

The Margraviate of Meissen (German: Markgrafschaft Meißen) was a medieval margraviate in central regions of the modern German state of Saxony. It was named after the city of Meissen, on the Elbe river. It was created in the 10th century, as a march (frontier province) of the Holy Roman Empire, encompassing regions of several Polabian Slavic tribes (Glomatians, Nisans and other Sorbs). Initially ruled by margraves from various noble houses, it was granted to the House of Wettin in 1089, and became its stronghold and center of gradual agglomeration of Wettin feudal domains. In 1423, the Wettins acquired the Duchy of Saxe-Wittenberg, thus also becoming Prince-Electors of Saxony, but the process of gradual administrative integration of various Wettin domains was marked by further divisions (1464, 1485, 1547). Only after 1547, when the junior Albertine branch, which held the Margraviate of Meissen, also took over the Saxon Electoral office and core possessions from the elder Ernestine branch, did the process of territorial integration of all Albertine regions into the redefined Electorate of Saxony take place. Traditions of the Meissen Margraviate were kept, among them the primary titles of Wettin rulers, and their later heirs, after the abolition of monarchy in 1918.

== Predecessors ==
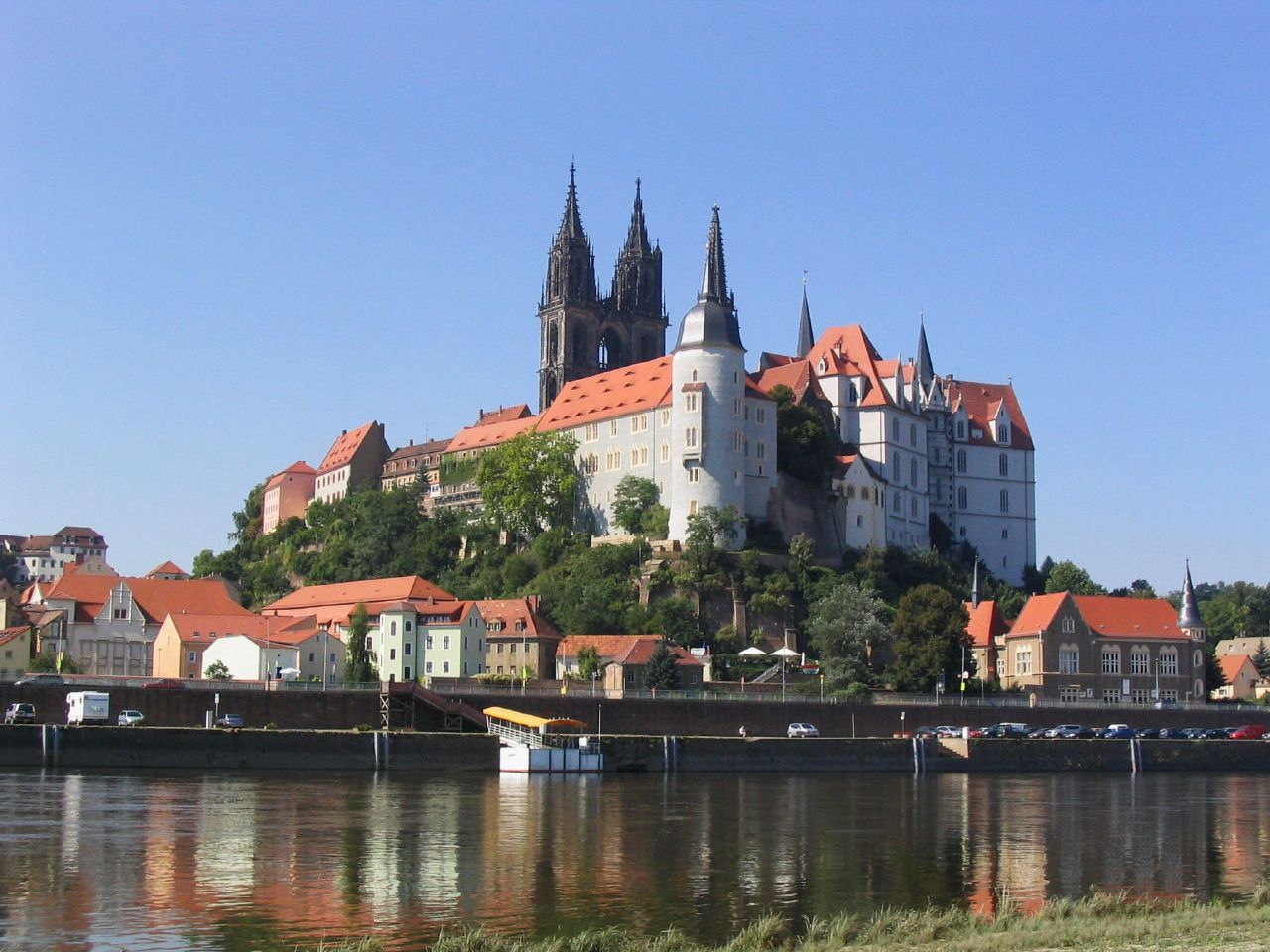
Meissen, with Albrechtsburg and Cathedral

In the mid 9th century, the area of the later margraviate was part of an eastern frontier zone of the Carolingian Empire called Sorbian March (Limes Sorabicus), after Sorbian tribes of Polabian Slavs settling beyond the Saale river. In 849, a margrave named Thachulf was documented in the Annales Fuldenses. His title is rendered as dux Sorabici limitis, "duke of the Sorbian frontier", but he and his East Frankish successors were commonly known as duces Thuringorum, "dukes of the Thuringians", as they set about establishing their power over the older Duchy of Thuringia in the west.

The Sorbian march had already lost its importance around 900 AD; the last known margrave Poppo was deposed by King Arnulf in 892 and replaced with Conrad who continued to appear as a "Duke of Thuringia". Conrad himself was replaced by Burchard, whose title in 903 was marchio Thuringionum, "margrave of the Thuringians".

Due to scarce sources, the geographical extent of the Frankish march east of the Saale is a matter of ongoing debate among historians; it may have reached up to the settlement area of the Slavic Glomacze (Talaminzi) tribes beyond the Mulde river, identified as eastern neighbours of the Sorbs by the Bavarian Geographer about 850. These territories were under constant attacks by the East Frankish rulers; in 908 they were first campaigned by the Saxon prince Henry the Fowler, son of Duke Otto the Illustrious. By 928/29, the main Glomacze fortress on the Jahna river was destroyed and their lands up to the Dresden Basin incorporated into the March of Gero I.

== Founding ==
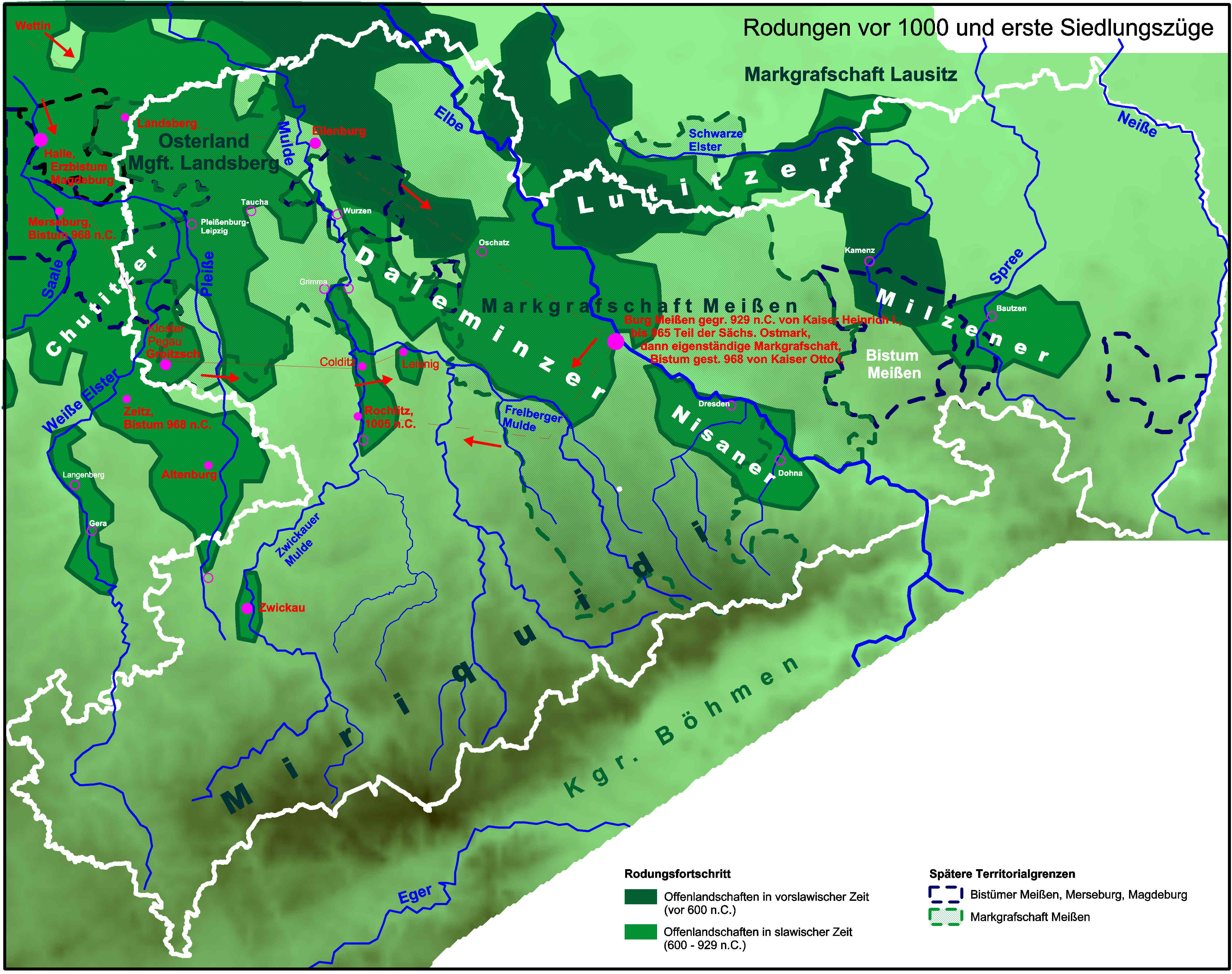
Establishment of Meissen among Polaban Slavic tribes in the 10th century

In 928 and 929, during the final campaign against the Glomacze tribes, Henry the Fowler, East Frankish king since 919, chose a rock above the confluence of the Elbe and Triebisch rivers to erect a new fortress, called Misni (Meissen) Castle after the nearby Meisa stream. The fortifications were renamed Albrechtsburg in the 15th century.

A town soon developed around the castle. King Henry, however, made no attempts to Germanise the Slavs or to create a chain of burgwards around his fortress. Sat alone, like Brandenburg, with few defenses or towns around it; Meissen probably was temporarily occupied by Bohemian forces from 936 onwards. The town beneath the fortress grew, however, eventually becoming one of the most important cities in the initial March of Gero I, covering the Slavic lands east of the Saxon stem duchy. King Henry, and later on his son and successor Otto I, continued the Slavic campaigns into the lands of the Polabian Milceni tribes around Bautzen (Budissin), with their gained territory being gradually incorporated into the Saxon Eastern March.

Saxon Eastern March(es) after the Great Slav Rising of 983

When the March of Gero I was divided, sometime after 965, Meissen became the center of a new march with the goal of controlling the local Slavic population. The first Meissen margrave, Wigbert, is mentioned in a 968 charter of the Archdiocese of Magdeburg. That same year, the Meissen fortress also became the see of the newly created Bishopric of Meissen. In 978, the Saxon count Rikdag became the Margrave of Meissen, and incorporated the marches of Merseburg and Zeitz into Meissen. By 982, the territory of the march had extended as far as the Kwisa river to the east and as far as the slopes of the Ore Mountains to the south, where it shared a border with the Přemyslid duchy of Bohemia.

In 983, following the defeat of Emperor Otto II at the Battle of Stilo, the Slavic Lutici tribes bordering eastern Saxony rebelled in the Great Slav Rising. The newly established bishoprics of Havelberg and Brandenburg as well as the March of Zeitz were overrun by Lutici tribes. Margrave Rikdag joined forces with the Margraves of Lusatia and the Northern March, the Bishop of Halberstadt, and the Archbishop of Magdeburg and defeated the Slavs in the gau of Balsamgau near Stendal. Nevertheless, large territories of the Northern March were lost, and the German forces were pushed back west of the Elbe.

Margrave Eckard I from Thuringia succeeded Rikdag as Margrave of Meissen in 985. His descendants of the Ekkeharding noble family would keep the margravial title until 1046. Upon his appointment, Eckard allied with Duke Mieszko I of Poland in order to reconquer Meissen Castle from Duke Boleslaus II of Bohemia whose forces occupied it the year before. When Eckard was assassinated in 1002, however, Mieszko's son, the Polish king Bolesław I Chrobry, took the occasion to conquer the margravial lands east of the Elbe and demanded the surrender of Meissen. The following German–Polish War ended with the 1018 Peace of Bautzen, whereby Meissen had to cede the Milceni region (later Upper Lusatia) to Poland. In 1031 however, King Conrad II of Germany was able to reconquer the Milceni lands, which were returned to Meissen.

In 1046, Count Otto of Weimar-Orlamünde became margrave, followed by Egbert II of the Brunonids upon his death in 1067. Egbert II entered into a longstanding conflict with Emperor Henry IV, because of which he had to renounce the Milceni lands to Duke Vratislaus II of Bohemia in 1076, and was finally deposed during the Investiture Controversy in 1089.

== Wettin rule ==
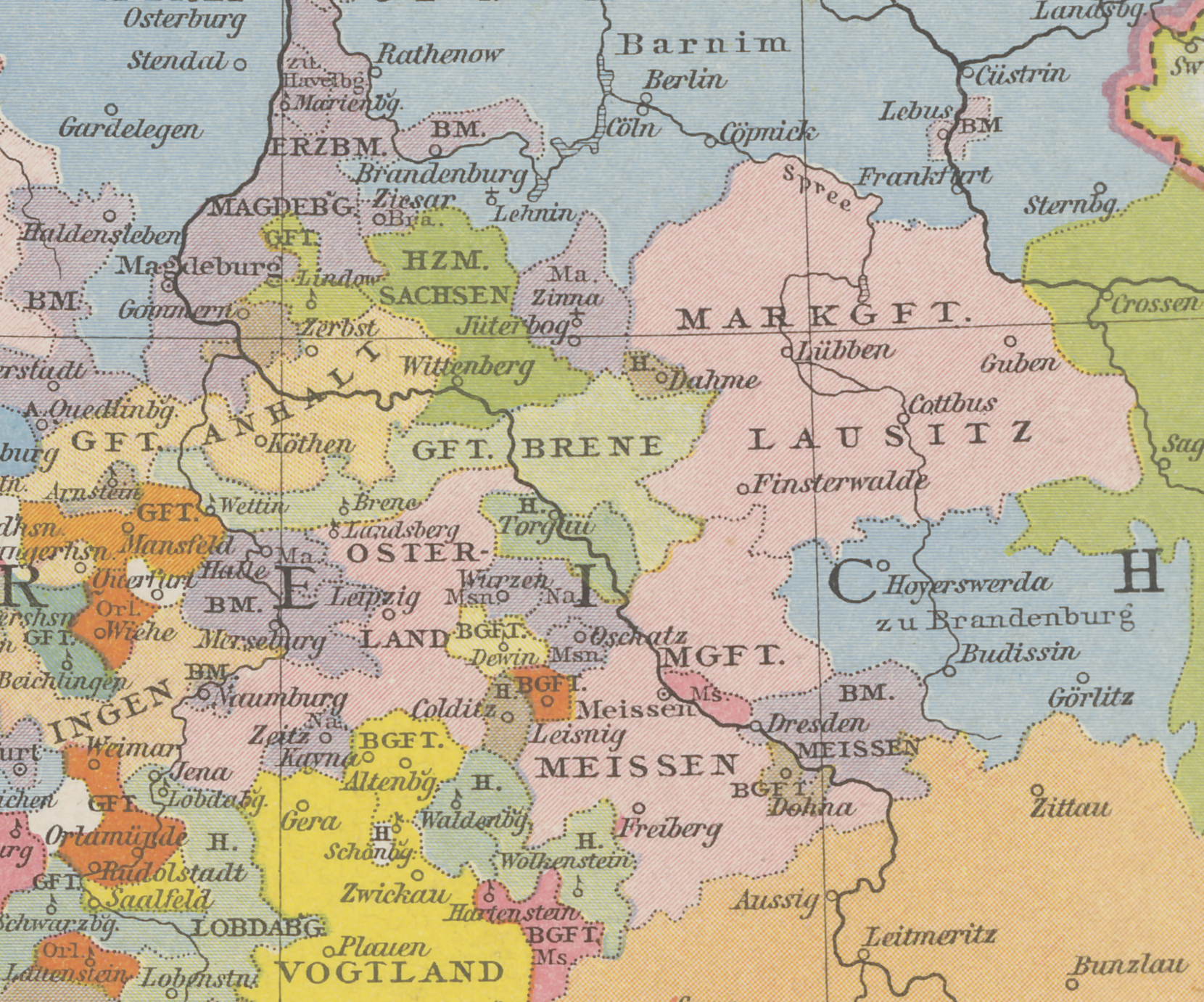
Upper Saxony about 1260, Wettin territories of Meissen, Lusatia and Osterland (Landsberg) in pink

Emperor Henry IV then granted Meissen to Count Henry of Eilenburg of the Wettin dynasty. The margraviate would remain under Wettin rule for the rest of its existence. Under Wiprecht von Groitzsch in the 1120s, Meissen underwent a process of Germanisation. He was succeeded by Conrad the Great (1123–56), Otto the Rich (1156–91), and Dietrich the Hard-Pressed (1191–1221), under whom the march would expand and develop. By then, Meissen had become a stronghold of the Wettin dynasty, suspiciously eyed by the Hohenstaufen emperors who nevertheless were not able to deprive the margraves of their power.

In 1264, during the War of the Thuringian Succession, Margrave Henry III asserted himself in the Landgraviate of Thuringia, where his uncle Henry Raspe had died childless. Between 1243 and 1255, Henry III had also acquired the intermediate Pleisseland around Altenburg in pawn. In 1307, the attempt by the Luxembourg king Henry VII to once again subdue the Margraves of Meissen failed with his defeat at the Battle of Lucka. By that time the margraviate was de facto independent of any sovereign authority. In the following years, there would be joint rule of Meissen by multiple members of the Wettin dynasty at any given time. In 1382 and 1445, this even led to the division of the march, however it would reunite soon after each time. Meissen was often enlarged by marriage, purchase, or conquest, which is how it gained the rights to the burgraviate in 1426.

In 1423, Margrave Frederick IV was assigned the heirless Duchy of Saxe-Wittenberg, formerly held by the House of Ascania, by Emperor Sigismund in turn for his support against the Hussites. The Wettin rulers thereby entered into the Saxon electorate, in which they ultimately merged their old lands. In the late 15th century, the dynasty held a large contiguous territory between the Werra and Oder rivers. By the 1485 Treaty of Leipzig, however, the Upper Saxon lands were again divided between Frederick's grandsons Ernest ruling in Wittenberg and Albert, who took the former Meissen territory. The treaty marked the beginning of the permanent separation of the two states of Saxony and Ernestine Thuringia. In 1547, Albertine branch took over the Saxon Eectorate from the Ernestine branch, thus initiating the final integration of the Meissen Margraviate and all other possessions into the Albertine Electorate of Saxony. Thus the margraviate ceased to exist as an administrative province, but Albertine rulers retained the margravial title.

== Burgraviate ==
The Burgraviate of Meissen was first mentioned in 1068 when King Henry IV appointed a burgrave at the Imperial Castle of Meissen. The burgraves of Meissen were royal officials tasked with asserting the king's authority in the region. They served as a counterbalance to the margrave and the bishop, who resided in the predecessor structure of the Albrechtsburg in Meissen. The burgrave's jurisdiction encompassed several villages in the surrounding area, reinforcing its administrative role within the medieval political framework. However, the Vogtland was never formally integrated into the Burgraviate, as the two regions shared only a common overlord without direct territorial affiliation. The burgraves initially hailed from the Meinheringer dynasty, holding authority for several centuries. In 1426, the title and domain transitioned to the House of Plauen, marking a new phase in the Burgraviate's history.

The Burgraviate of Meissen should not be confused with the Bishopric of Meissen or the Margraviate of Meissen, as each represented distinct territorial and political entities within the Holy Roman Empire.

== See also ==
- List of margraves of Meissen
- List of margravines of Meissen
- List of the burgraves of Meissen

== Sources ==
- Althoff, Gerd (1999). "Saxony and the Elbe Slavs in the Tenth Century". The New Cambridge Medieval History. Vol. 3. Cambridge: Cambridge University Press. pp. 267–292.
- Bachrach, David S. (2013). "Henry I of Germany's 929 military campaign in archaeological perspective". Early Medieval Europe. 21 (3): 307–337.
- Bachrach, David S. (2020). "The Eastern Campaigns of King Henry II of Germany, 1003–17". Journal of Medieval Military History. 18: 1–36.
- Hardt, Matthias (2001). "Hesse, Elbe, Saale and the Frontiers of the Carolingian empire". The Transformation of Frontiers: From Late Antiquity to the Carolingians. Leiden: Brill. pp. 219–232.
- Heinze, Erich (1925). "Die Entwicklung der Pfalzgrafschaft Sachsen bis ins 14. Jahrhundert". Sachsen und Anhalt: Jahrbuch der Historischen Kommission für die Provinz Sachsen und für Anhalt. 1: 20–63.
- Pech, Edmund (2015). "Milzener, Lusizer und Glomaci-Daleminzer: Kontroversen zur frühen Geschichte der Sorben". Lětopis: Zeitschrift für sorbische Sprache, Geschichte und Kultur: Časopis za rěč, stawizny a kulturu Łužiskich Serbow. 62 (2): 119–132.
- Stieldorf, Andrea (2026) [2012]. Marken und Markgrafen: Studien zur Grenzsicherung durch die fränkisch-deutschen Herrscher (2nd ed.). Wiesbaden: Harrassowitz Verlag.
- Wilson, Peter (2016). Heart of Europe: A History of the Holy Roman Empire. Cambridge: Harvard University Press.
- Thompson, James Westfall. Feudal Germany, Volume II. New York: Frederick Ungar Publishing Co., 1928.
