= Adelaide of Meissen =

Queen of Bohemia from 1198 to 1199

Queen consort of Bohemia
- Tenure: 1198–1199
- Born: after 1160; Meissen, Margraviate of Meissen
- Died: 2 February 1211 (aged 51?); Meissen
- Spouse: Ottokar I of Bohemia (m. 1178; div. 1199)
- Issue: Dagmar, Queen of Denmark
- House: Wettin
- Father: Otto II, Margrave of Meissen
- Mother: Hedwig of Brandenburg

Adelaide of Meissen (Czech: Adléta Míšeňská, German: Adelheid von Meißen; c. 1160 – 2 February 1211), a member of the House of Wettin, was Queen of Bohemia from 1198 to 1199 as the first wife of King Ottokar I. When her husband declared their marriage null and void, she began a longstanding legal dispute that involved numerous religious and secular dignitaries of her time.

== Life and marriage ==
Adelaide was born about 1160 as the daughter of Margrave Otto II of Meissen (1125–1190) and his wife Hedwig of Brandenburg (d. 1203), a daughter of the Ascanian margrave Albert the Bear. She met her future husband in the 1170s, in the time of his exile during internal struggles within the Bohemian Přemyslid dynasty. The couple married in 1178 without attendance and consent from their families. It is possible that the marriage was forced on the grounds of her pregnancy. Adelaide gave birth to a son, Vratislaus, soon after.

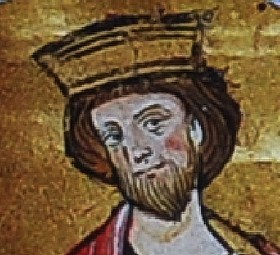
Ottokar I, Landgrafenpsalter illuminated manuscript (1211–1213)

Shortly after the marriage, the couple could return to Bohemia, when Ottokar's brother Frederick (Bedřich) 'assumed the reins' and made Ottokar one of the leaders of his armed forces in the Moravian lands. In 1192 Ottokar himself ascended the Prague throne and even achieved his recognition by the Hohenstaufen emperor Henry VI; however, he lost support and was deposed soon after. He again had to leave Bohemia, together with his wife and four children.

Adelaide came to Meissen at the court of her brother Margrave Albert the Proud. Meanwhile, Ottokar became a mercenary of German princes to profit from the German throne dispute between Emperor Henry's brother Philip of Swabia and the Welf duke Otto of Brunswick. At this time the couple got estranged. Ottokar decided to solve the problem in a way exclusive to all dynastic principles.

== Two queens ==
By the end of 1197, Ottokar came to terms with his younger brother Vladislaus III and succeeded as Bohemian duke for the second time. He finally obtained the hereditary royal title according to the Golden Bull of Sicily issued by Philip of Swabia. Shortly after that, he repudiated his wife and also his adult son Vratislav. Ottokar was at least 40 at that time and risked losing the heir. Adelaide and her daughters again stayed in Meissen, while Vratislav became a mercenary in Germany and Italy.

In 1199, King Ottokar divorced Adelaide, officially on the grounds of consanguinity. They were both descendants of Margrave Henry of Schweinfurt and the Polish king Mieszko II Lambert. They were fifth cousins once removed or fourth cousins once removed. Ottokar married Princess Constance of Hungary, daughter of King Béla III, who was his fourth cousin thrice removed, later in the same year.

Adelaide, however, had no intention to waive her rights nor to have her children considered as illegitimate. She began litigation in 1199, calling the Hohenstaufen family and Pope Innocent III for help. In the German throne dispute, both the Hohenstaufen and Welf party alternating stood for her rights. In 1205 Adelaide could return to Prague for a while after Ottokar had signed an agreement with Philip of Swabia. Moreover, his first-born son with Constance of Hungary had died, and Ottokar decided to marry his daughter with Adelaide, Margaret (Dagmar), to King Valdemar II of Denmark in this time. However, when Constance gave birth to another son, later king Wenceslaus I, in 1205, Adelaide, with her daughters, had to leave Bohemia permanently. She retired to the Holy Cross monastery in Meissen.

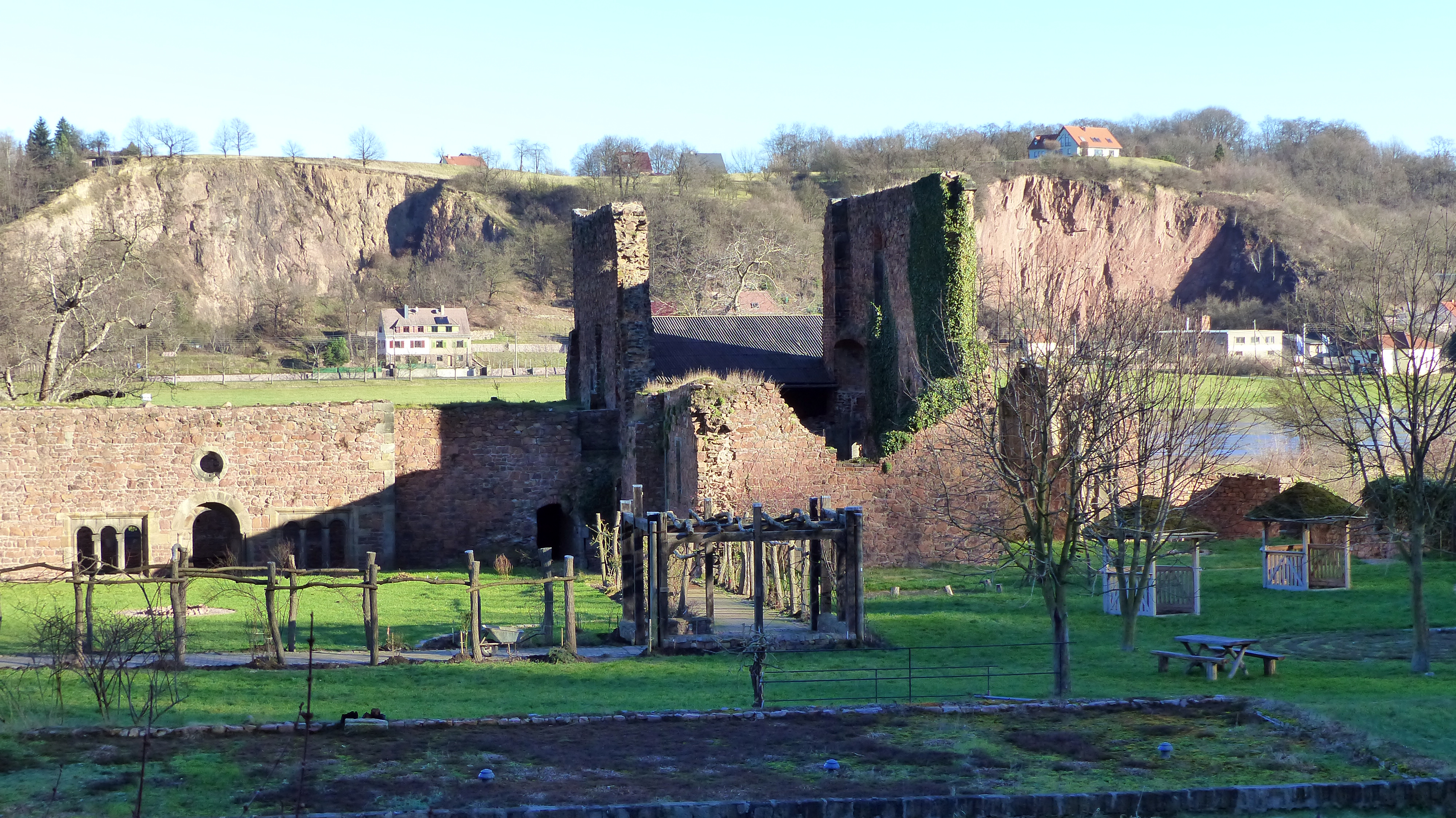
Ruins of Holy Cross Abbey, Meissen

The Pope still used the pending lawsuit for leverage, but finally decided that the cessation of marriage was legal. Adelaide still struggled, though, in 1210, she had lost. She died one year later in her Meissen exile.

== Issue ==
- Vratislaus (d. bef. 1225).
- Margaret (Dagmar) (d. 24 May 1212), married to King Valdemar II of Denmark.
- Božislava (d. 6 Feb bef. 1238), married to Count Henry I of Ortenburg.
- Hedwig (Hedvika), nun in Gernrode Abbey and St. George's Convent, Prague.

== Sources ==
- Curta, Florin (2019). Eastern Europe in the Middle Ages (500-1300). BRILL. ISBN 978-90-04-39519-0.
- Klaniczay, Gábor (2002). Holy Rulers and Blessed Princesses: Dynastic Cults in Medieval Central Europe. Cambridge University Press. ISBN 978-0-521-42018-1.
- Loud, Graham (2019). The Chronicle of Arnold of Lübeck. Routledge. ISBN 978-0-429-62452-0.
- Wihoda, Martin (2015). Vladislaus Henry: The Formation of Moravian Identity. BRILL. ISBN 978-9004303836.

Adelaide of Meissen Wettin dynasty Born: 1160? Died: 2 February 1211
Royal titles
Vacant Title last held by Hellicha of Wittelsbach	Duchess consort of Bohemia; 1192–1193	Last holder
Vacant Title last held by Judith of Thuringia	Queen consort of Bohemia; 1198–1199	Vacant Title next held by Constance of Hungary
