= Dagmar of Bohemia =

Queen of Denmark from 1205 to 1212

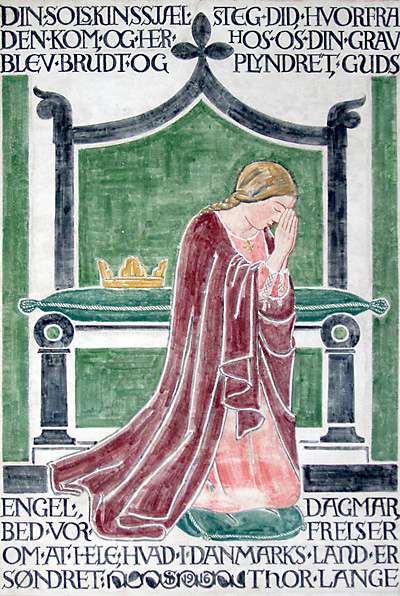

Queen consort of Denmark
- Tenure: 1205–1212
- Born: c. 1186; Meissen
- Died: 24 May 1212; Ribe
- Burial: St. Bendt's Church
- Spouse: Valdemar II of Denmark
- Issue: Valdemar the Young
- Dynasty: Přemyslid
- Father: Ottokar I of Bohemia
- Mother: Adelheid of Meissen

Dagmar of Bohemia (also known as Margaret, Czech: Markéta Přemyslovna, Danish: Margrete af Bøhmen; c. 1186 – 24 May 1212) was Queen of Denmark as the first spouse of King Valdemar II. She was the daughter of King Ottokar I of Bohemia and his first wife, Adelaide of Meissen.

== Early life ==
Margaret's father, Ottokar I, became Duke of Bohemia in 1192, but in 1193 was deposed. He then left Bohemia with his family. His wife, Adelaide, and their children found a new home at the court of her brother Albert I, Margrave of Meissen. Ottokar became a mercenary for German rulers. In 1197, Ottokar became the Duke of Bohemia for a second time. He repudiated Adelaide and divorced her in 1199 on the grounds of consanguinity. He married Constance of Hungary later the same year. This step, together with other maneuvers, helped him later to obtain the hereditary elevation of his title to king.

Adelaide did not waive her rights. In 1205, she returned to Prague temporarily. At that time, Ottokar decided to marry their daughter, Margaret, to Valdemar II of Denmark. His new wife Constance gave birth to a son, later King Wenceslaus I of Bohemia, the same year. Adelaide left Bohemia soon and died a few years later.

== Queen ==
Before his first marriage, Valdemar had been betrothed to Richeza of Bavaria, daughter of the Duke of Saxony. When that engagement fell through, he married Margaret, now known as Dagmar, in 1205 at Lübeck. According to the records of Annales Ryenses (Rydårbogen), in 1206 Queen Dagmar influenced Valdemar to release one of his most fervent enemies, Valdemar, Bishop of Schleswig, who had been held in captivity since 1193.

In 1209, Queen Dagmar gave birth to Valdemar the Young (c. 1209–1231). Queen Dagmar died on 24 May 1212 while giving birth to her second son, who did not survive. Valdemar II elevated Valdemar the Young as co-king at Schleswig in 1218. However, Valdemar was accidentally shot with an arrow while hunting at Refsnæs in North Jutland during 1231.

Not many things are known about Dagmar as a person. Most of the image of Dagmar comes from later folksongs, myths and legends, designed to present her as an ideal Christian queen; mild, patient and universally loved, in contrast to her unpopular successor, Queen Berengaria. Old folk ballads say that on her deathbed she begged Valdemar to marry Kirsten, the daughter of Karl von Rise, and not the "beautiful flower" Berengaria of Portugal. In other words, she predicted a struggle for the Danish throne between the sons of Berengaria.

After Dagmar's death, in order to build good relations with Flanders (a commercially important territory to the west of Denmark's hostile southern neighbours), Valdemar married Berengária of Portugal in 1214. Queen Dagmar is buried in St. Bendt's Church in Ringsted, on one side of Valdemar II, with Queen Berengária buried on the other side of the King.

== Dagmar Cross ==
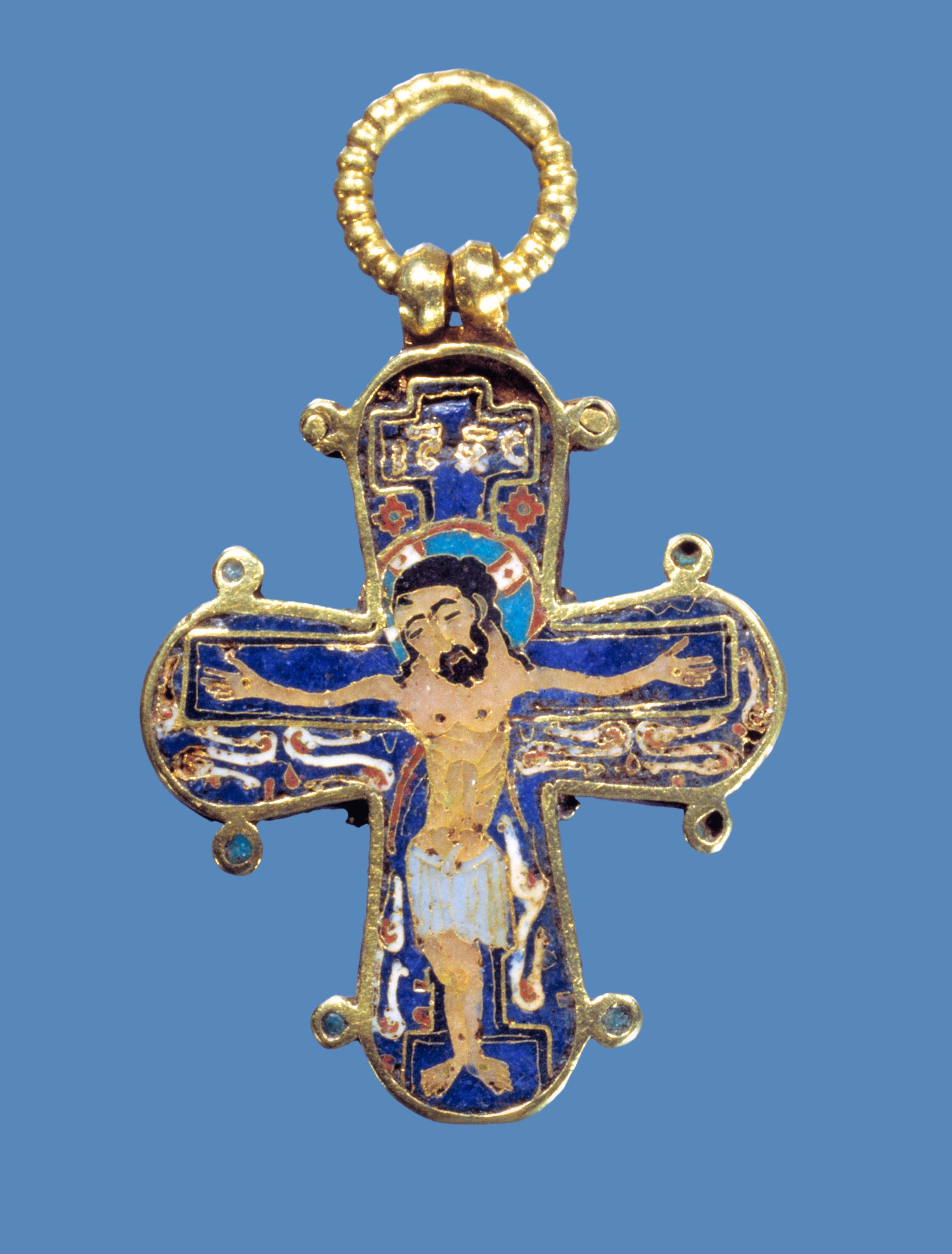
Dagmar Cross (Dagmarkorset)

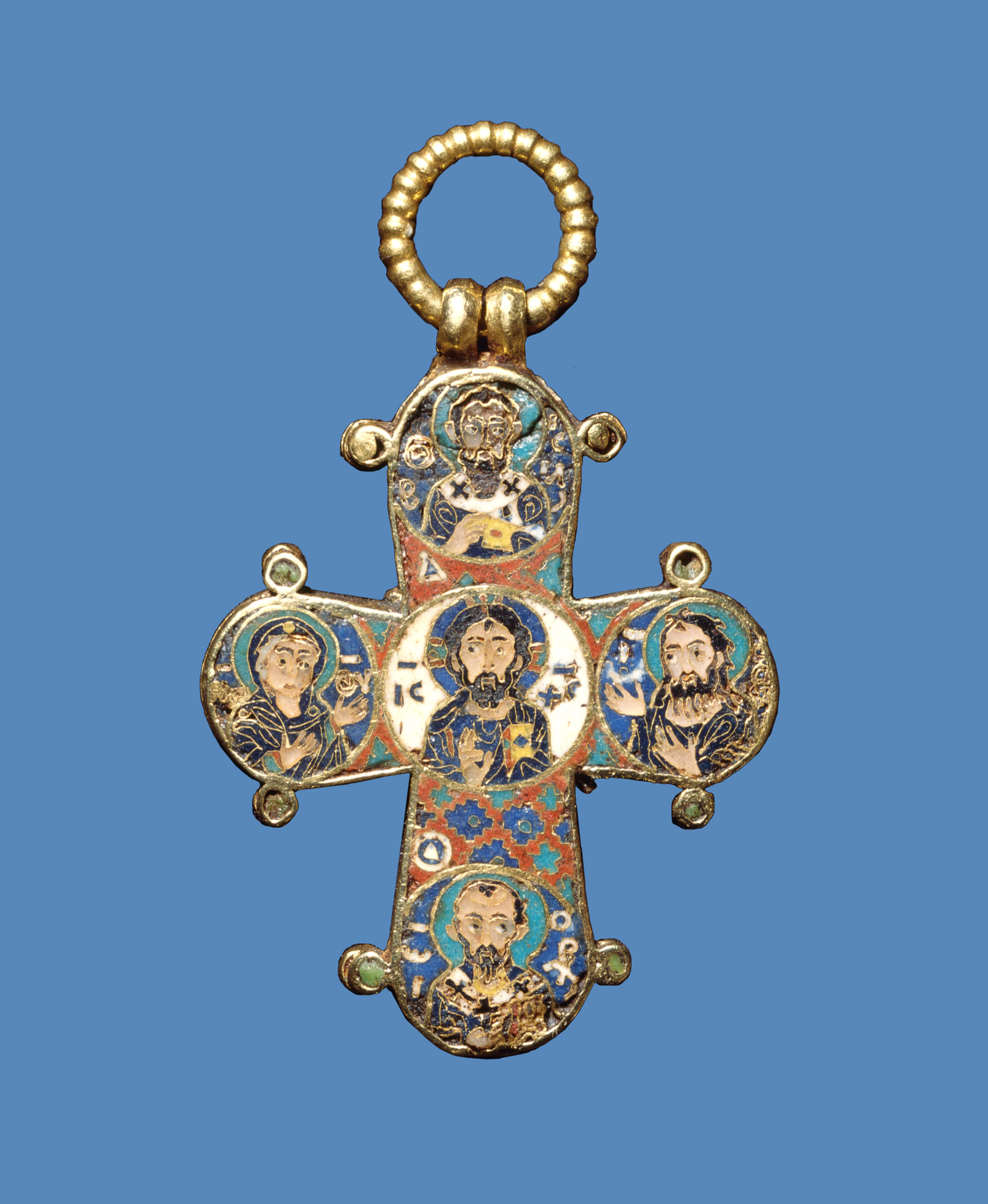
Reverse of Dagmar Cross

A pectoral cross now well known as the Dagmar Cross (Dagmarkorset) was found lying on the breast of Queen Dagmar’s remains when the tomb was opened in 1683. In 1695 the cross was donated to the National Gallery of Denmark. The jewel of Byzantine design and workmanship, is of gold, enamelled, having on one side a crucifix, and on the other side portraits of Christ in the center, St Basil, St John Chrysostom, Mary the Virgin and St John the Apostle-Evangelist. In 1863, King Frederick VII of Denmark donated a replica of the cross to Princess Alexandra of Denmark, daughter of the later King Christian IX of Denmark when she married the Prince of Wales, later King Edward VII of England.

In the modern era, the Dagmar Cross "is worn by Danish girls for their confirmation into the Lutheran Church, and is also given to children as a baptismal gift." In the Lutheran Church of Sweden, "the cross is now delivered to the new bishop, on his installation in office, by the Archbishop of Uppsala, together with the mitre and crozier."

== Gallery ==
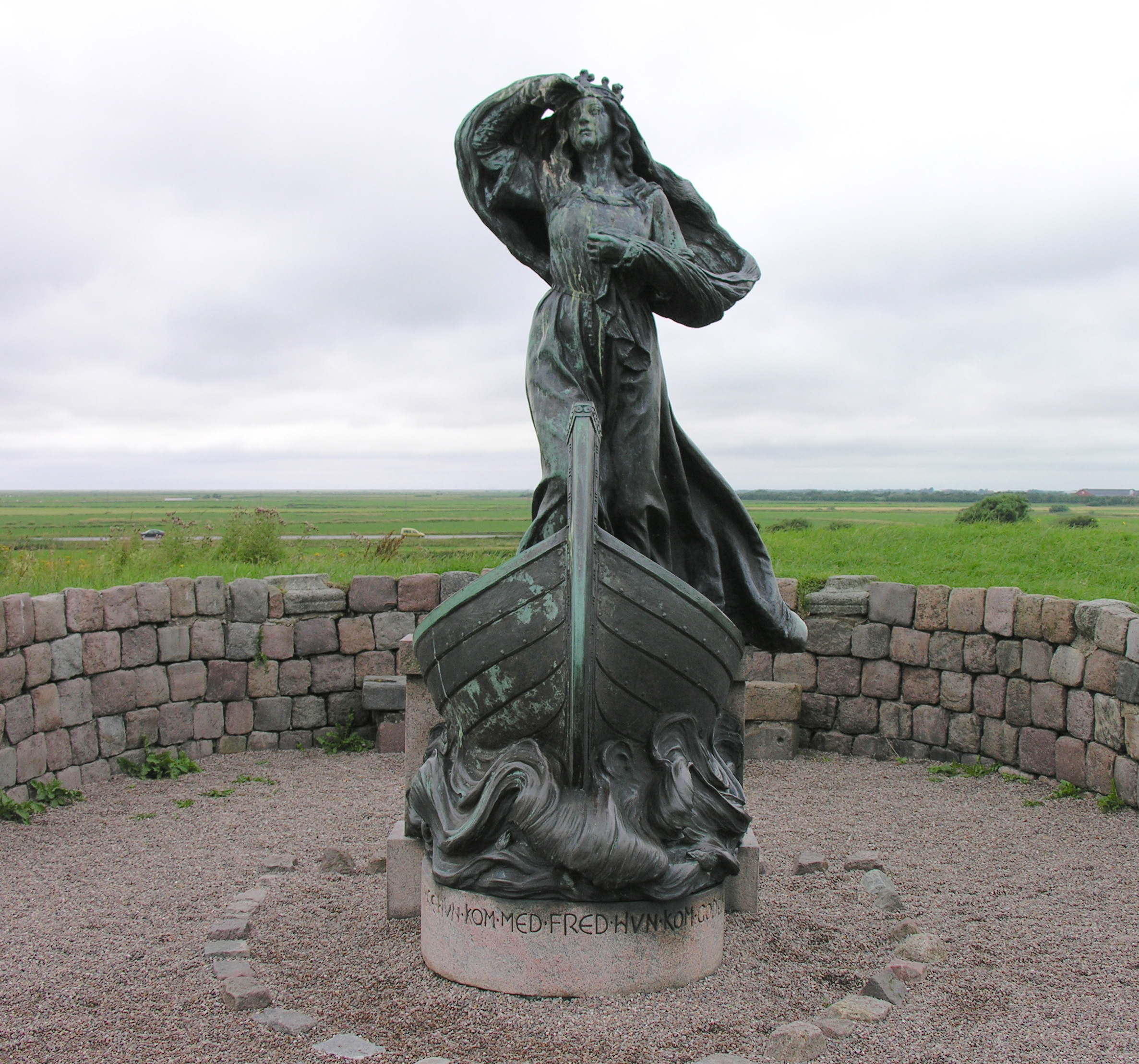
Statue of Queen Dagmar by sculptor Anne Marie Carl-Nielsen, Riberhus

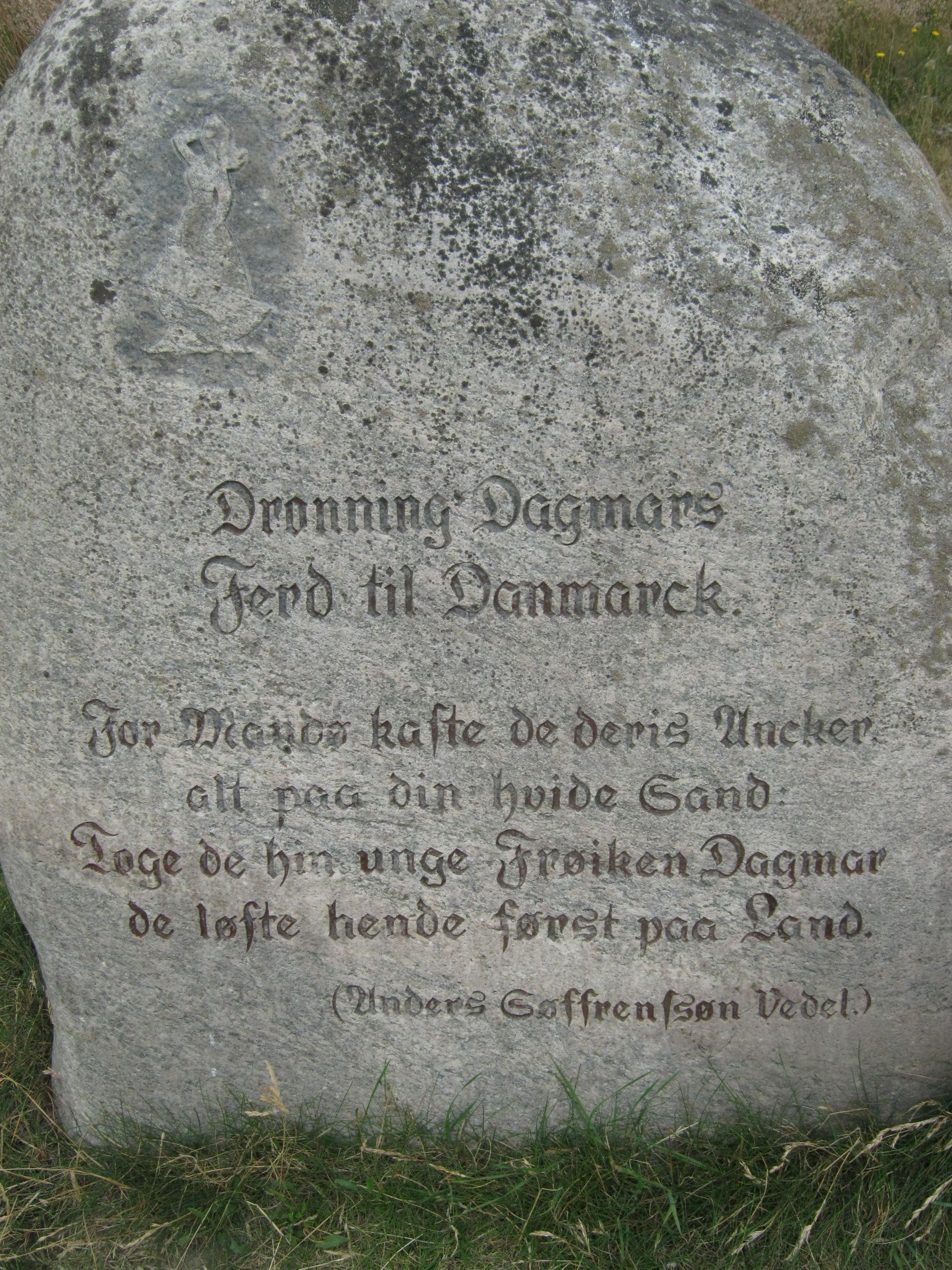
Queen Dagmar memorial at Mandø, Jutland

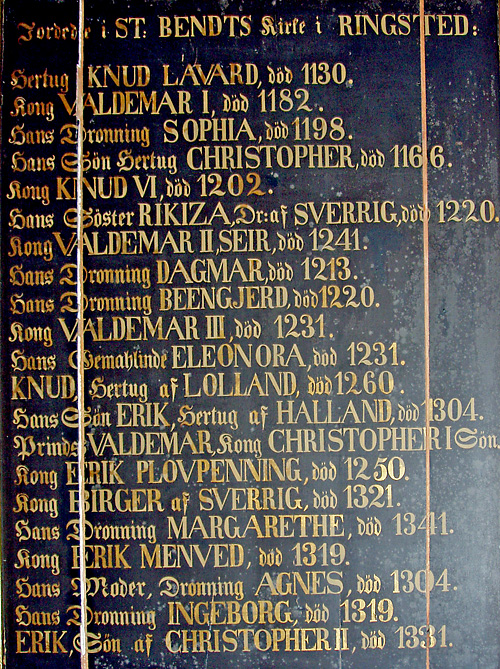
Royal burials in St. Bendt's Church, Ringsted

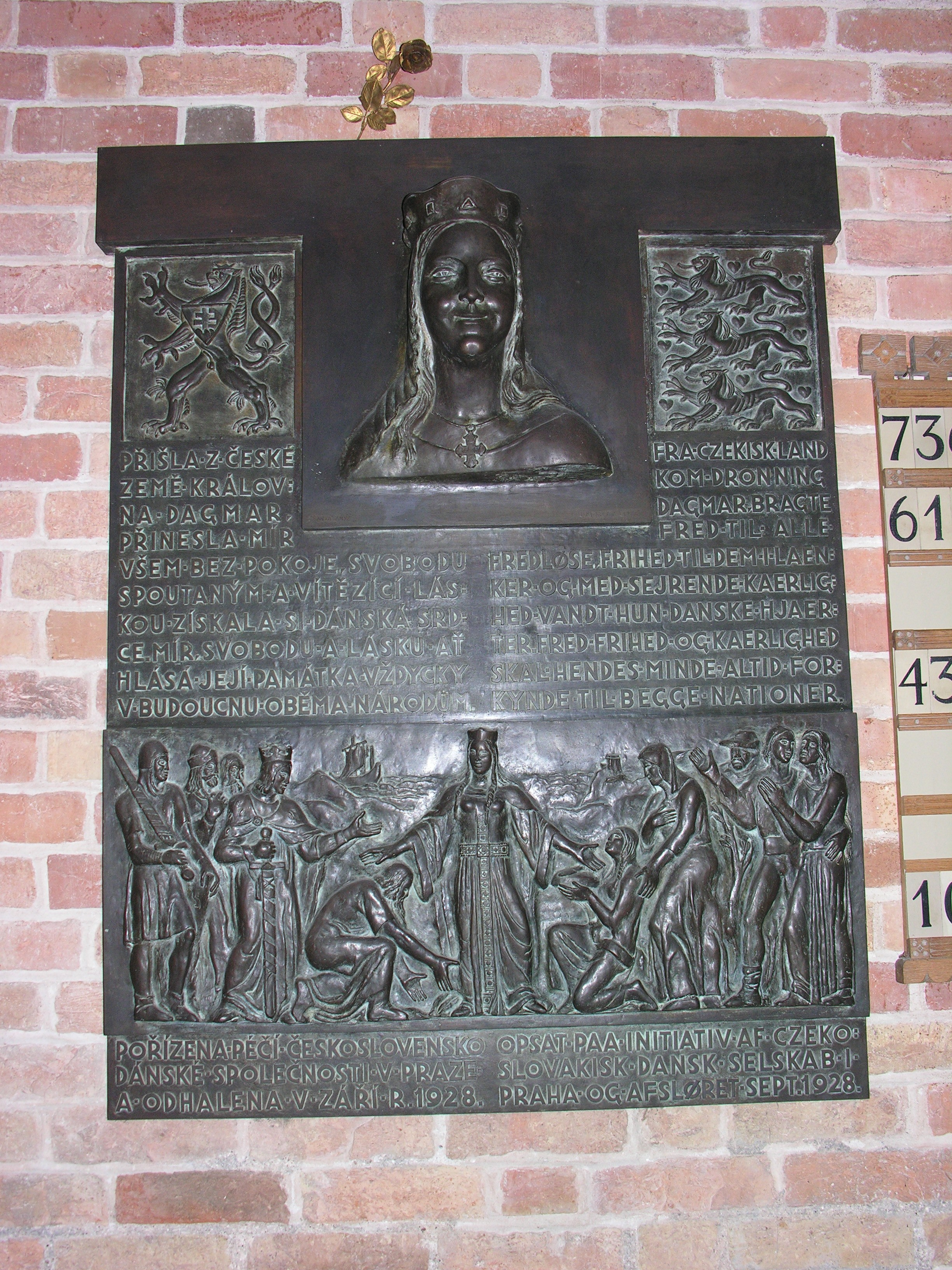
Plaque in honor of Queen Dagmar, Ringsted

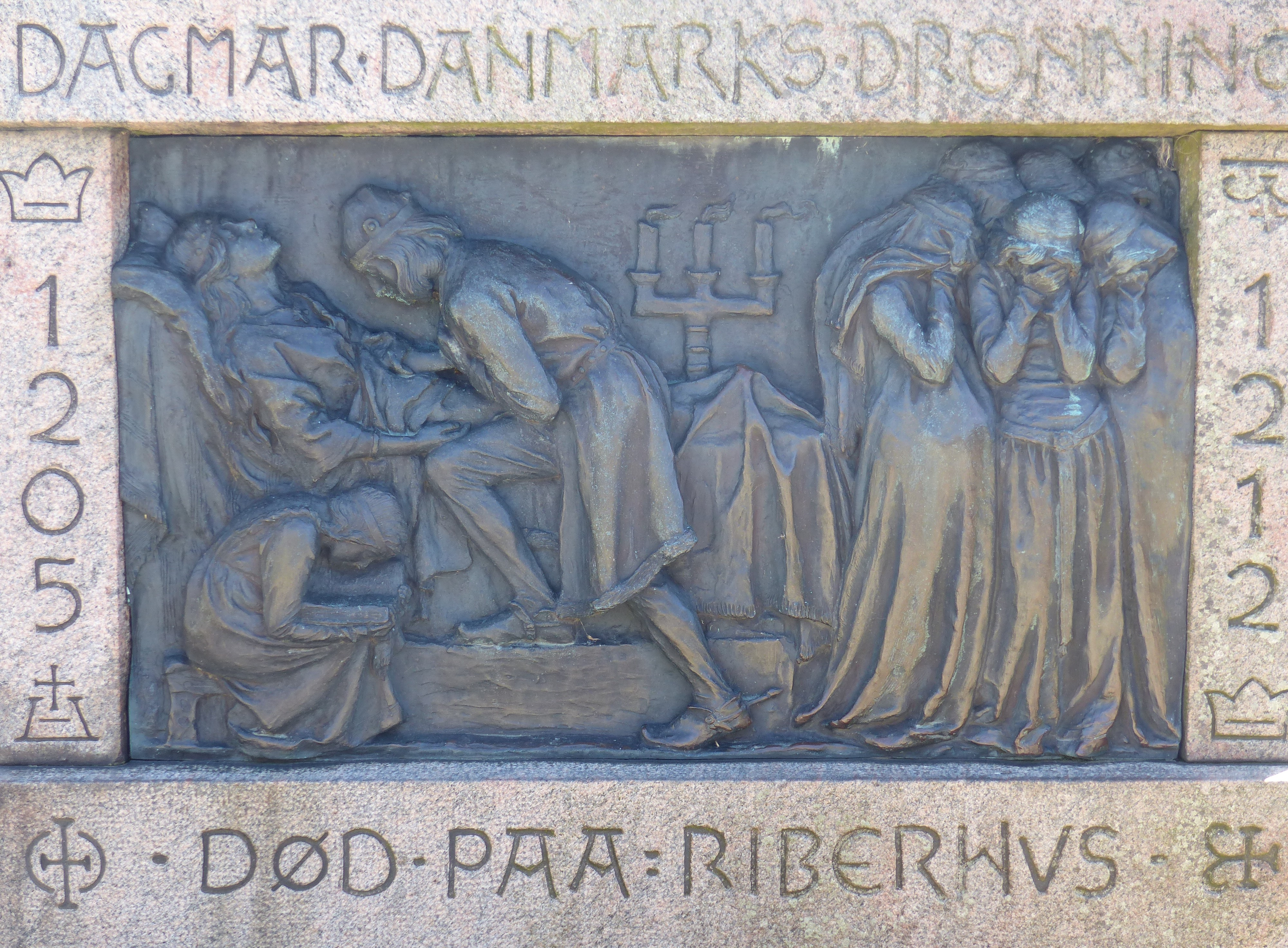
Relief by Anne Marie Carl-Nielsen depicting the death of Queen Dagmar based on its rendition in an old Danish folk song, Riberhus

== Sources ==
- Earenfight, Theresa (2013). Queenship in Medieval Europe. Palgrave Macmillan. ISBN 978-1137303929.

Dagmar of Bohemia House of Přemysl Born: 1186? Died: 24 May 1212
Danish royalty
Preceded by Gertrude of Bavaria	Queen consort of Denmark; 1205–1212	Succeeded by Berengaria of Portugal
