= Hedwig of Brandenburg =

German Margravine of Meissen (c.1140–1203)

- Margravine of Meissen
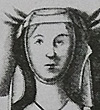
- 17th century depiction
- Born: c. 1140
- Died: End of March 1203
- Buried: Altzella Abbey
- Noble family: House of Ascania
- Spouse: Otto II, Margrave of Meissen
- Issue: Albert I, Margrave of Meissen; Adelaide of Meissen; Theodoric I, Margrave of Meissen
- Father: Albert the Bear
- Mother: Sophie of Winzenburg

Hedwig of Brandenburg, also called Hedwig of Ballenstedt (c. 1140 – end of March 1203), a member of the House of Ascania, was Margravine of Meissen from 1156 until 1190 by her marriage with Margrave Otto II.

== Life ==
Hedwig was born about 1140 as a daughter of the Ballenstedt count Albert the Bear, first Margrave of Brandenburg from 1157, and his wife Countess Sophie of Winzenburg. At the age of 15, she married Otto, son and heir of Margrave Conrad of Meissen, a member of the House of Wettin. The conjugal union between the two Saxon dynasties ruling large estates in the Eastern March was probably arranged in view of the expansionist policies of Duke Henry the Lion.

Little is known about Hedwig's life. In 1162, she initiated the founding of the Cistercian monastery of Altzella near Nossen. This would provide the Margraves of Meissen with bailiwick rights over the location where they buried deceased family members and erected memorials. Altzella was, due to its location, also an important starting point of residential development in Meissen.

Hedwig has been described as generally a strong woman, who exerted a significant influence on her husband. It was alleged that she was the one that convinced him to alter the order of succession, so that her husband would not be succeeded by his eldest son Albert, as normal, but by his younger son Theodoric. Albert did not accept this change and started a feud against his father and brother. In 1189, he even took his father prisoner. The conflict ended when Albert died in 1195.

== Death ==
Hedwig died in late March 1203 and was buried on 1 April 1203 in Altzella Abbey, alongside her husband, who had died in 1190.

== Issue ==
Hedwig and Margrave Otto II of Meissen had four children:

- Albert I (1158-1195), Margrave of Meissen from 1190, married Sophia, daughter of Duke Frederick of Bohemia
- Adelaide of Meissen (1160-1211), married King Ottokar I of Bohemia in 1198
- Theodoric I (1162-1221), Margrave of Meissen from 1195, married Jutta of Thuringia, daughter of Landgrave Hermann I
- Sophia of Meissen, married Duke Oldřich of Olomouc.
