= Vladislaus Henry =

Vladislaus Henry may refer to:

- Vladislaus Henry I of Moravia (r. 1192–1194, 1197–1222), also Vladislaus III of Bohemia (1197)
- Vladislaus Henry II of Moravia (r. 1224–1227)
- Vladislaus Henry III of Moravia (r. 1246–1247)
