= Vladislaus, Margrave of Moravia =

Vladislaus, Margrave of Moravia may refer to:

- Vladislaus III, Duke of Bohemia (c. 1160 – 1222), elected Duke of Bohemia in 1197 and Margrave of Moravia from 1197 until his death
- Vladislaus II of Moravia (1207 – 1227 or 1228), son of Otakar I of Bohemia, Margrave of Moravia from 1222 to his death
- Vladislaus III of Moravia (1227–1247), eldest son of Wenceslaus I of Bohemia
