= Otto II of Meissen =

Margrave of Meissen (1156-1190)

Otto II
- Margrave of Meissen
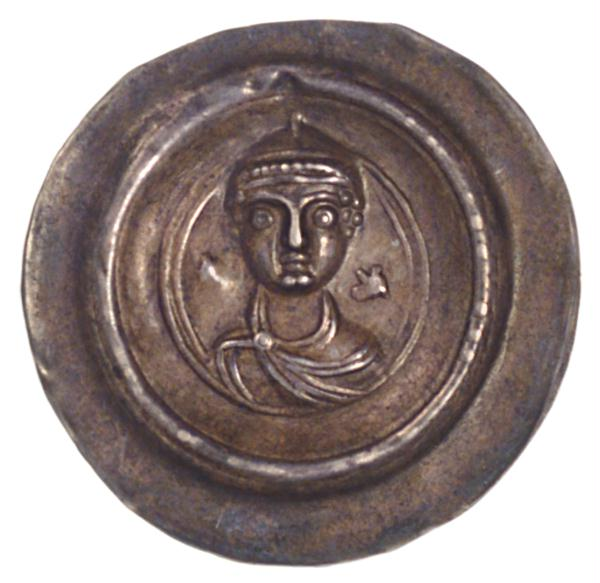
- Coin of Otto, c. 1156
- Reign: 1156–1190
- Predecessor: Conrad
- Successor: Albert I
- Born: 1125
- Died: 18 February 1190 (aged 64–65)
- Buried: Altzella Abbey
- Noble family: Wettin
- Spouse: Hedwig of Brandenburg
- Issue: Albert I, Margrave of Meissen; Adelaide of Meissen; Theodoric I, Margrave of Meissen
- Father: Conrad, Margrave of Meissen
- Mother: Liutgard of Ravenstein-Elchingen

Otto II, the Rich (German: Otto der Reiche; 1125 – 18 February 1190), a member of the House of Wettin, was Margrave of Meissen from 1156 until his death. His nickname, "the Rich," stems from the discovery of significant silver deposits near the site of the future city of Freiberg around 1168. Otto successfully claimed the rights to these mineral resources, greatly increasing his wealth. He also established the Cistercian monastery of Altzella in 1162, which became the burial site for the House of Wettin.

== Life ==
He was the eldest surviving son of Conrad, Margrave of Meissen and Lusatia. When his father, under pressure from Emperor Frederick Barbarossa, retired and entered the Augustinian convent of Lauterberg in 1156, Otto succeeded him in Meissen while his younger brothers Theodoric and Dedi received the March of Lusatia and the County of Groitzsch with Rochlitz.

The partition meant a weakening of the Wettin rule, and Otto's Imperial politics remained rather ineffective. He had to stand by and watch the emperor's extension of power in the Pleissnerland territory around Altenburg, Chemnitz and Zwickau; moreover he picked an unsuccessful quarrel with the rising burgraves of Dohna in the Eastern Ore Mountains. Together with Archbishop Wichmann of Magdeburg he joined Emperor Frederick's expedition against the rebellious Saxon duke Henry the Lion in 1179, however, he failed to benefit from his downfall.

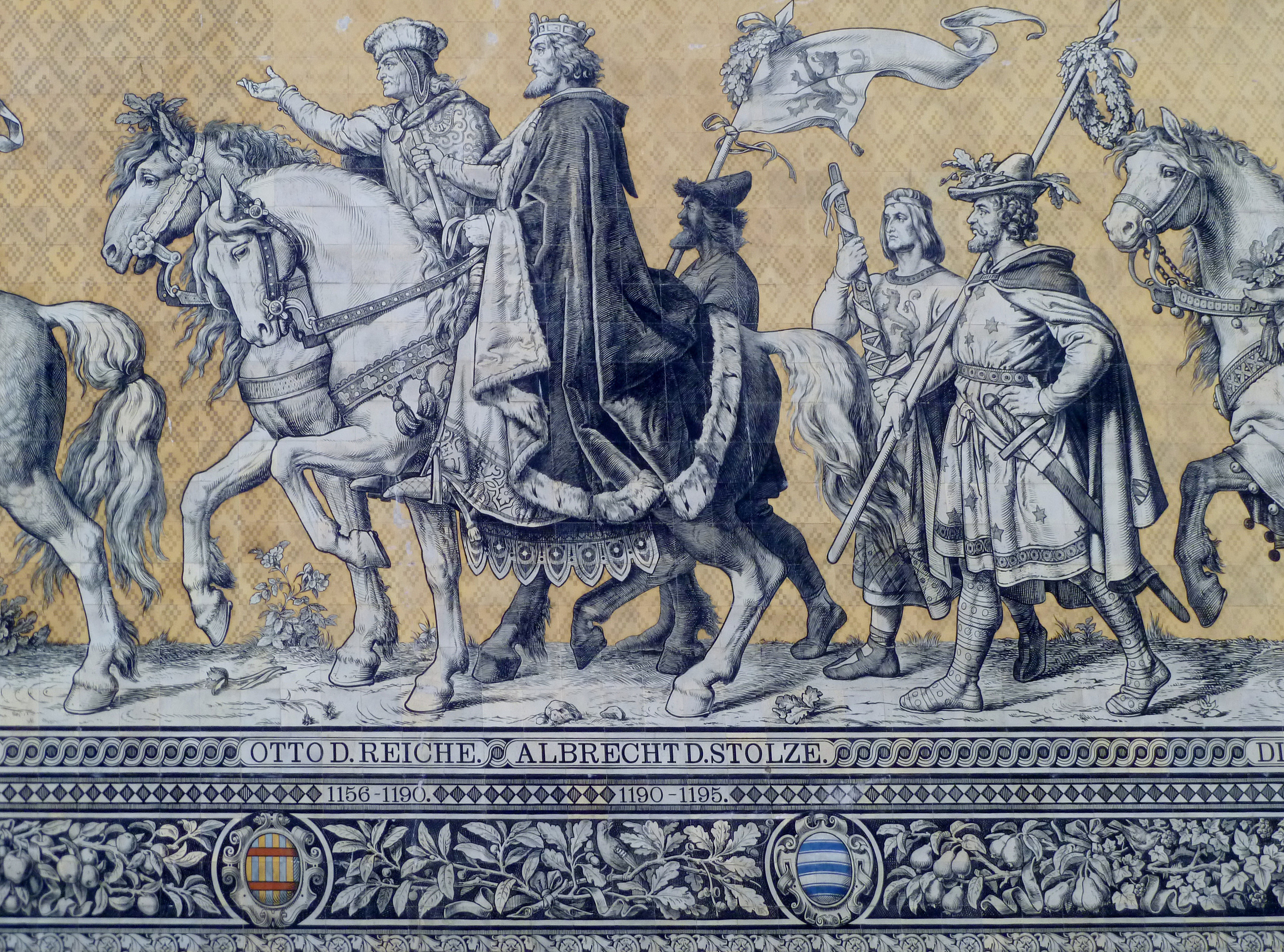
Otto and his son Albert, depicted in the Dresden Fürstenzug

Otto's domestic policies were more successful: about 1165 he vested the citizens of Leipzig, located at the crossways of the Via Regia and Via Imperii trade routes, with town privileges and founded the St. Nicholas Church. He also established Altzella Abbey on the Miriquidi estates on the slopes of the Ore Mountains he had received from the emperor, where silver was discovered near Christiansdorf in 1168. The new mining town (Bergstadt) of Freiberg and its revenues soon became one of the margrave's most important sources of income, earning him the later epithet "the Rich".

In his later years, Otto had to cope with fierce inheritance quarrels between his sons Albert and Theoderic. The margrave preferred the younger brother Theodoric and in turn was captured and arrested by Albert, who was backed by Otto's brother Dedi and his son Conrad. Emperor Frederick enforced his release from detention, nevertheless Albert could assert his claims and succeeded his father as margrave. The fraternal feud, however, lingered on until Albert's sudden death (presumably poisoned) in 1195.

== Marriage and children ==
Otto married Hedwig of Brandenburg, a daughter of the Ascanian margrave Albert the Bear. The couple had four children:

- Albert I (1158-1195), Margrave of Meissen from 1190, married Sophia, daughter of Duke Frederick of Bohemia
- Adelaide of Meissen (1160-1211), married King Ottokar I of Bohemia in 1198
- Theodoric I (1162-1221), Margrave of Meissen from 1195, married Jutta of Thuringia, daughter of Landgrave Hermann I
- Sophia of Meissen, married Duke Oldřich of Olomouc.

== Sources ==
- Lyon, Jonathan R. (2013). Princely Brothers and Sisters: The Sibling Bond in German Politics, 1100-1250. Cornell University Press.
- Wihoda, Martin (2015). Vladislaus Henry: The Formation of Moravian Identity. BRILL. ISBN 978-9004303836.

Otto II of Meissen House of Wettin Born: 1125 Died: 18 February 1190
Preceded by Conrad	Margrave of Meissen; 1156–1190	Succeeded by Albert I
