= Pačejov =

- Municipality
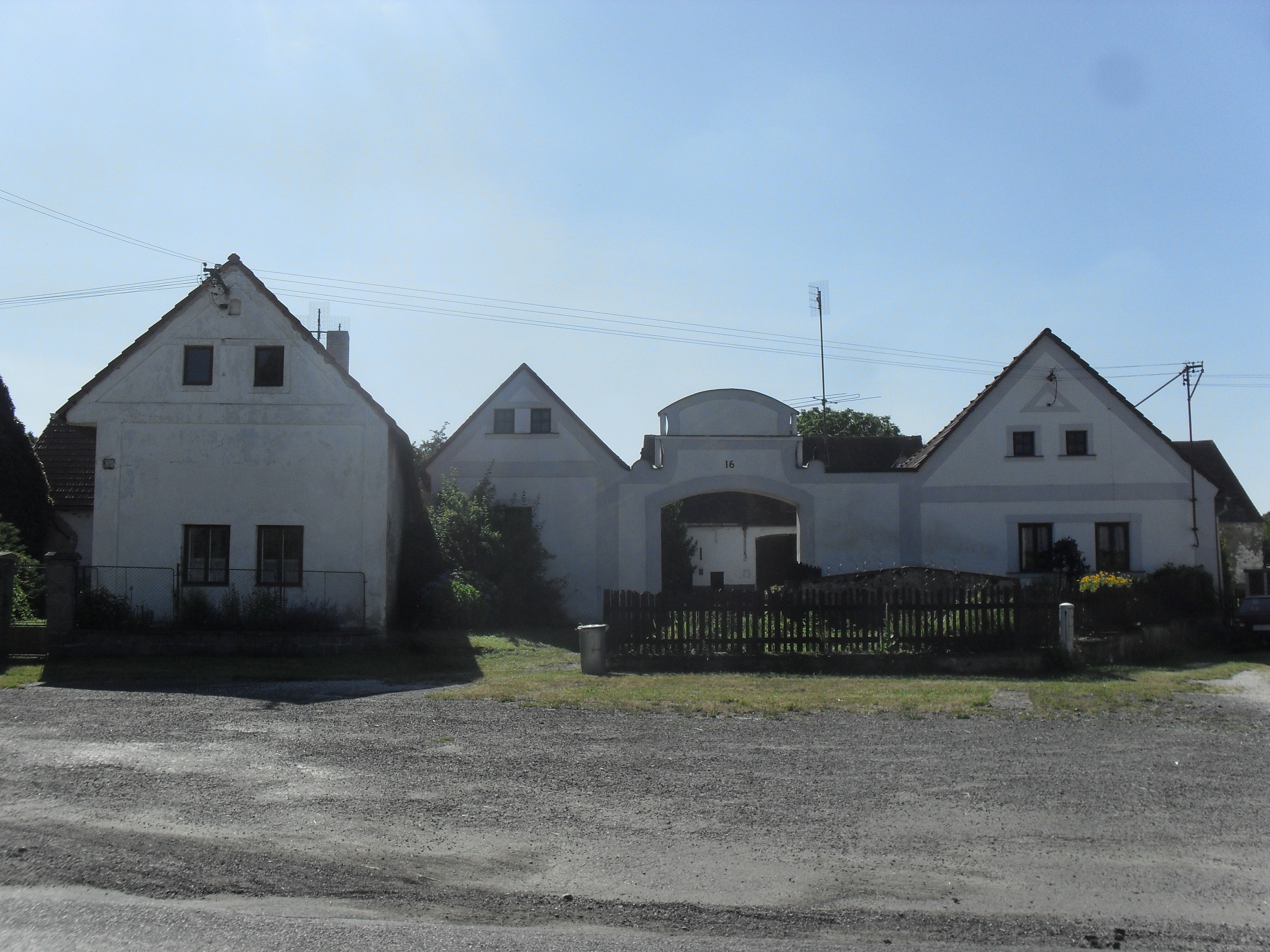
- Velešice, a part of Pačejov

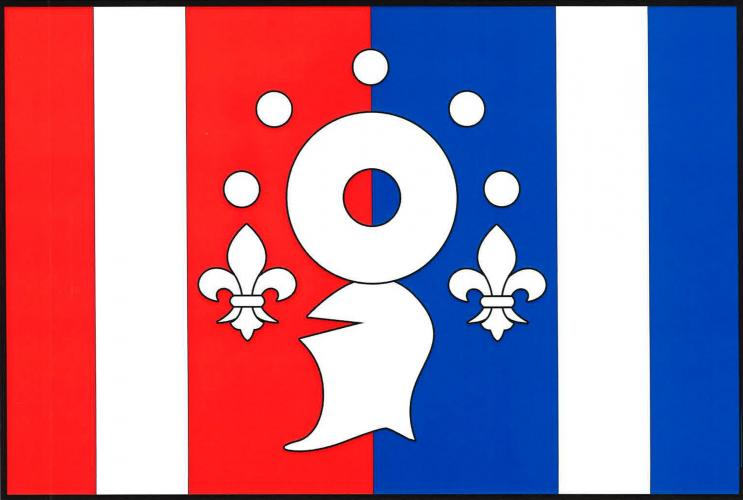
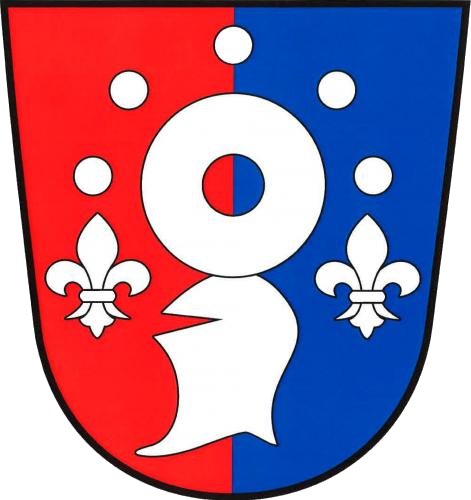
- Flag Coat of arms

- Location in the Czech Republic
- Coordinates: 49°22′23″N 13°37′58″E
- Country: Czech Republic
- Region: Plzeň
- District: Klatovy
- First mentioned: 1227

Area
  - Total: 16.64 km^{2} (6.42 sq mi)
- Elevation: 548 m (1,798 ft)

Population (2026-01-01)
  - Total: 677
  - Density: 40.7/km^{2} (105/sq mi)
- Time zone: UTC+1 (CET)
  - Summer (DST): UTC+2 (CEST)
- Postal code: 341 01
- Website: www.pacejov.cz

Pačejov is a municipality and village in Klatovy District in the Plzeň Region of the Czech Republic. It has about 700 inhabitants.

Pačejov lies approximately 27 kilometres (17 mi) east of Klatovy, 46 km (29 mi) south-east of Plzeň, and 97 km (60 mi) south-west of Prague.

== Administrative division ==
Pačejov consists of five municipal parts (in brackets population according to the 2021 census):

- Pačejov (155)
- Pačejov-nádraží (347)
- Strážovice (68)
- Týřovice (28)
- Velešice (71)

== History ==
The first written mention of Pačejov is in a deed of King Ottokar I from 1227.

== Demographics ==
Historical population
Year	Pop.	±%
1869	1,156	—
1880	1,224	+5.9%
1890	1,148	−6.2%
1900	1,207	+5.1%
1910	1,178	−2.4%
1921	1,181	+0.3%
1930	1,055	−10.7%
1950	991	−6.1%
1961	991	+0.0%
1970	965	−2.6%
1980	891	−7.7%
1991	804	−9.8%
2001	783	−2.6%
2011	763	−2.6%
2021	669	−12.3%
Source: Censuses
