= Bretislav III =

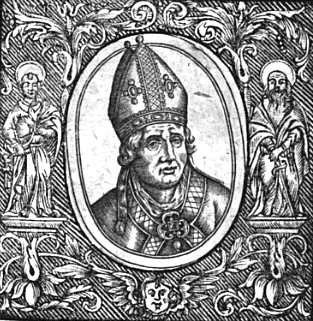

Bishop of Prague
- Reign: February 1182 – 15 or 19 June 1197
- Predecessor: Vališ
- Successor: Daniel II

Duke of Bohemia
- Reign: 1193 – 15 or 19 June 1197
- Predecessor: Ottokar I
- Successor: Vladislaus Henry
- Born: c. 1137
- Died: 15 or 19 June 1197 (aged c. 60); Eger
- Burial: Doksany Abbey
- Spouse: none
- Issue: none
- Dynasty: Přemyslid
- Father: Jindřich
- Mother: Margarete

Henry Bretislav (latinized as Bretislaus, Czech: Jindřich Břetislav; died 15 or 19 June 1197), a member of the Přemyslid dynasty, was Bishop of Prague from 1182, then Duke of Bohemia as "Bretislav III" from 1193 to his death.

== Ecclesiastical career ==
Henry was a son of Jindřich (d. after 1169) and his wife Margaret. After his studies at the University of Paris, he returned to Bohemia and was named provost at the Basilica of St. Peter and St. Paul in Vyšehrad. In 1182, he accepted the diaconate from the hands of his Přemyslid cousin Archbishop Adalbert III of Salzburg. Henry Bretislav was elected on 25 March 1182 as successor of the late bishop of Prague Valentin, and went to Mainz to receive affirmation by Metropolitan Christian I. He was ordained a priest on 22 May and crowned bishop the following day.

Bretislav soon came into conflict with Duke Frederick of Bohemia, who had regained the Bohemian throne in 1178 and usurped discretionary power over ecclesiastical properties. In 1187, the bishop officially addressed Emperor Frederick Barbarossa to complain about the duke's infringements. In turn, the emperor elevated Henry Bretislav to a prince of the Holy Roman Empire, providing that the Prague bishop was only subject to the Holy Roman Emperor. However, the imperial immediacy did not outlast Bretislav's tenure.

In the ongoing quarrels over the Prague throne between Duke Frederick and his successors Conrad II and Wenceslaus II, he supported Ottokar, a younger son of the late King Vladislaus II with his second wife Judith of Thuringia. In 1192, Ottokar usurped the Bohemian throne from Wenceslaus II, allied with his younger brother Vladislaus Henry, Prince of Brno and Znojmo, whom he appointed Margrave of Moravia. Wenceslaus tried to petition Emperor Henry VI for assistance, but was captured. Henry Bretislav supported Ottokar, but was unable to pay the necessary tribute of 6,000 écus to the emperor for the Bohemian crown and the Moravian margraviate. While on a pilgrimage to Santiago de Compostela, he was captured by Henry VI, who held him captive at his court.

== Duke of Bohemia ==
Emperor Henry VI, however, was not ignorant of Bohemian affairs. When Ottokar joined a revolt of several German princes against the ruling House of Hohenstaufen, he and his brother and Vladislaus Henry were declared deposed in June 1193 by a decision of the Imperial Diet at Worms. Ottokar was abandoned by the nobility and fled; the emperor exempted his cousin Bishop Henry Bretislav from the payment and enfeoffed him with the Bohemian duchy. Margrave Vladislaus Henry was summoned to Prague Castle, where he had to spend the following years suspiciously eyed by Duke Bretislav.

Bretislav had to secure his duchy by force of arms. By Christmas 1193, he was keeping court at Prague. In 1195, he drove Vladislaus out of Moravia and installed one of his supporters in the march. Bretislav also took part in an Imperial campaign in Meissen, where his army plundered the churches. To make amends, he planned to take part in the German Crusade of 1197, decided on at the diet of Worms of December 1195, but due to his prolonged illness it was never actualised. When Ottokar marched against Prague, Henry Bretislav proceeded to the Imperial Palace in Eger (Cheb), where he died on 15 or 19 June 1197. He is buried in the Doksany monastery church.

On 23 June the Bohemian nobles elected Margrave Vladislaus Henry his successor. Shortly afterwards, he came to terms with his brother Ottokar, who finally ascended the Prague throne and the next year obtained the royal title from Philip of Swabia, confirmed by the German king Frederick II in the 1212 Golden Bull of Sicily.

== Sources ==
- Wihoda, Martin (2015). Vladislaus Henry: The Formation of Moravian Identity. Brill.

Bretislav III Přemyslid dynasty Died: 15 June 1197
Preceded by Ottokar I	Duke of Bohemia; 1193–1197	Succeeded by Vladislaus III
