= Ottokar of Bohemia =

Ottokar of Bohemia may refer to:

- Ottokar I of Bohemia (c. 1155 – 1230), King of Bohemia
- Ottokar II of Bohemia (c. 1233 – 1278), King of Bohemia
