= Theodoric I of Meissen =

Theodoric I
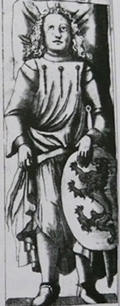
- Illustration of tombstone by Samuel Reyher (c. 1692)

Margrave of Meissen
- Reign: 1198–1221
- Predecessor: Henry VI, Holy Roman Emperor
- Successor: Henry III, Margrave of Meissen

Margrave of Lusatia
- Reign: 1210–1221
- Predecessor: Conrad II, Margrave of Lusatia
- Successor: Henry IV, Margrave of Lusatia
- Born: 11 March 1162
- Died: 18 February 1221 (aged 58)
- Spouse: Jutta of Thuringia
- Issue: Hedwig; Otto; Sophia; Konrad (illegitimate); Jutta; Henry III, Margrave of Meissen; Dietrich II of Meissen (illegitimate); Heinrich (illegitimate)
- House: Wettin
- Father: Otto II, Margrave of Meissen
- Mother: Hedwig of Brandenburg

Theodoric I, called the Oppressed (German: Dietrich der Bedrängte; 11 March 1162 – 18 February 1221), was the Margrave of Meissen from 1198 until his death. He was the second son of Otto II, Margrave of Meissen and Hedwig of Brandenburg.

== Biography ==
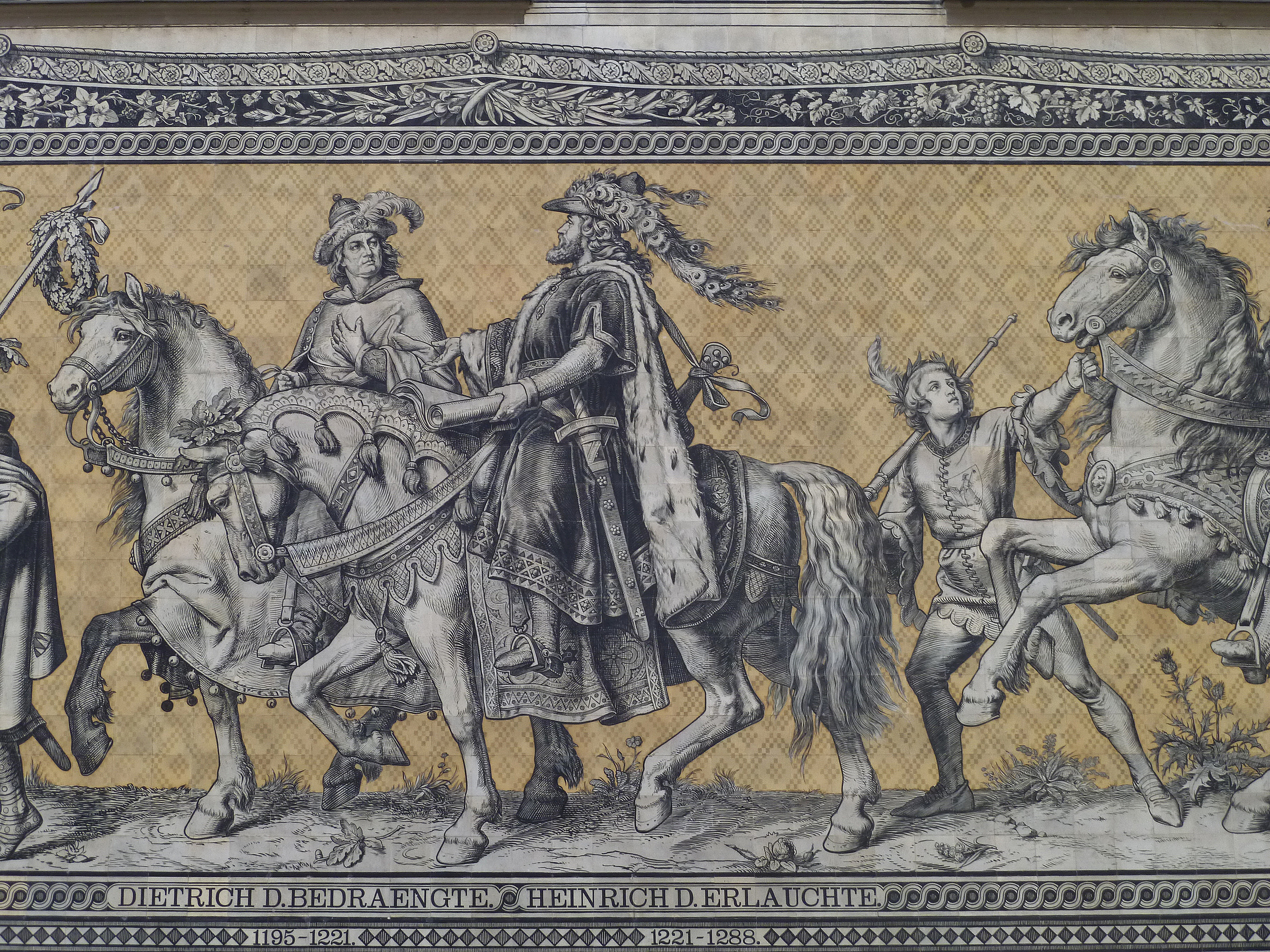
Theodoric I of Meissen and Henry III of Meissen, in the Procession of Princes at Dresden

Theodoric, called Dietrich on German, was the younger son of Otto II, Margrave of Meissen. Theodoric fell out with his brother, Albert the Proud, after his mother persuaded his father to change the succession so that Theodoric was given the Margraviate of Meissen and Albrecht (although the older son) the margraviate of Weissenfels. Albert took his father prisoner to try to make him reverse the change in succession. Otto obtained his release by an order of the emperor Frederick I, but died shortly after in 1190. Albert then took back the Meissen margraviate from his brother. Theodoric attempted to regain the margraviate, supported by Landgraf Hermann I of Thuringia, his father-in-law. In 1195, however, Theodoric left on a pilgrimage to Palestine.

== Albert’s Death ==
After Albert died in 1195, leaving no children, Meissen, with its rich mines, was seized by the emperor Henry VI as a vacant fief of the empire. Dietrich finally came into possession of his inheritance two years later on Henry's death.

At the time of the struggle between the two rival kings Philip of Swabia and Otto IV, Holy Roman Emperor, Phillip gave Dietrich the tenure of the march of Meißen again. After that time, Dietrich was on Phillip's side and remained true to the Staufer even after Phillip was murdered in 1208.

Dietrich became caught up in dangerous disagreements with the city of Leipzig and the Meißen nobility. After a fruitless siege of Leipzig, in 1217 he agreed to a settlement but then took over the city by trickery, had the city walls taken down and built three castles of his own within the city, full of his own men.

== Death ==
Margrave Dietrich died on 18 February 1221, possibly poisoned by his doctor, instigated into doing so by the people of Leipzig and the dissatisfied nobility. He left behind a widow, Jutta of Thuringia, daughter of Hermann I, Landgrave of Thuringia. Some of his children had already died.

== Marriages and issue ==
Children from his marriage to Jutta of Thuringia, daughter of Hermann I, Landgrave of Thuringia:

1. Hedwig (d. 1249) married Count Dietrich V of Cleves (1185–1260)
2. Otto (d. before 1215)
3. Sophia (d. 1280) married Count Henry of Henneberg-Schleusingen (d. 1262)
4. Jutta married Mestwin II, Duke of Pomerania
5. Henry the Illustrious (1218–1288) Margrave of Meissen

Children from extramarital liaisons:

1. Konrad
2. Dietrich, (d. 1272), bishop of Naumburg
3. Heinrich

== Sources ==
- Lyon, Jonathan R. (2013). Princely Brothers and Sisters: The Sibling Bond in German Politics, 1100-1250. Cornell University Press.
- Rasmussen, Ann Marie (1997). Mothers and Daughters in Medieval German Literature. Syracuse University Press. ISBN 9780815603894.

Theodoric I of Meissen House of Wettin Born: 11 March 1162 Died: 18 January 1221
| Vacant Royal domain Title last held by Albert I | Margrave of Meissen; 1198–1221 | Succeeded by Henry III |
| Preceded by Conrad II | Margrave of Lusatia; 1210–1221 | Succeeded by Henry III |
