= Fürstenzug =

Large porcelain mural in Germany

Coordinates: 51°03′10″N 13°44′21″E

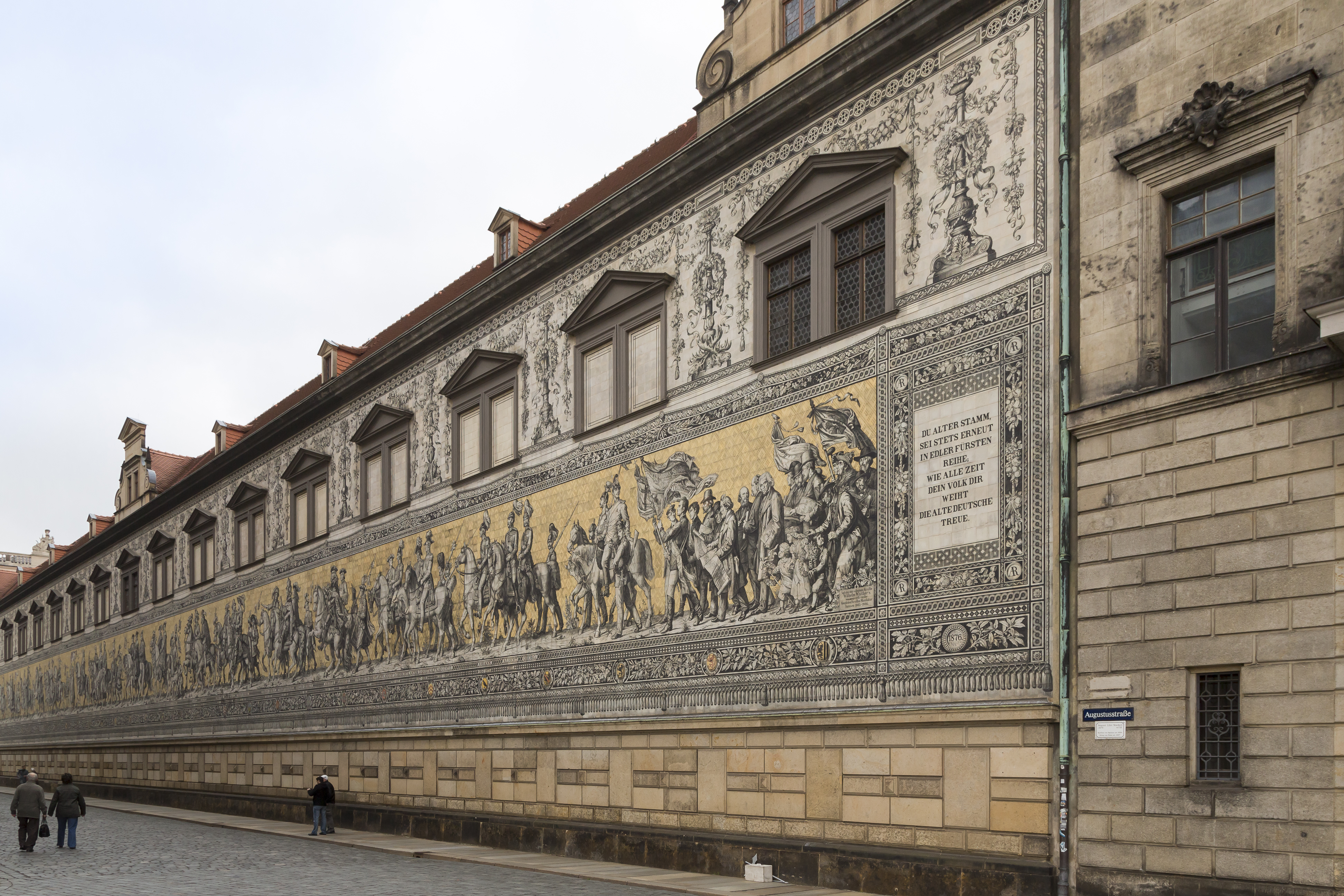
The Fürstenzug on Augustusstraße

The Fürstenzug (Procession of Princes) in Dresden, Germany, is a monumental mural depicting a mounted procession of the rulers of Saxony. Originally painted between 1871 and 1876 to commemorate the 800th anniversary of the House of Wettin, it was later transferred onto approximately 23,000 Meissen porcelain tiles between 1904 and 1907 to ensure its durability. At 102 metres (335 ft) in length, it is considered the largest porcelain artwork in the world. The mural portrays the ancestral lineup of 35 margraves, electors, dukes, and kings of the House of Wettin from 1127 to 1904.

The Fürstenzug adorns the outer wall of the Stallhof (Stables Courtyard) of Dresden Castle.

== History ==
By 1589, the outer wall of the recently built Stallhof (Stables Courtyard) of the Dresden Castle was already decorated with a fresco.

For the upcoming 800th anniversary of the House of Wettin in 1889, another stucco version of a large-scale mural was commissioned. It was painted by the artist Wilhelm Walther between 1871 and 1876. Since the picture rapidly deteriorated, it was replaced with about 23,000 Meissen porcelain tiles between 1904 and 1907. The mural depicts the 35 Saxon margraves, electors, dukes and kings from Conrad, Margrave of Meissen, who ruled in the 12th century, to George of Saxony, who was king for only two years in the 20th century. The only ones missing are Heinrich I von Eilenburg (c. 1089) and the last king of Saxony, Frederick Augustus III, who ruled from 1904 to 1918. Also shown are 59 scientists, artisans, craftsmen, children and farmers.

Only minimal damage to the tiles resulted from the February 13, 1945, bombing of Dresden.

== Panorama ==
The Fürstenzug, starting with Margrave Conrad in the 12th century (left) to King George who ruled at the beginning of the 20th century (right)

== Shown noblemen ==
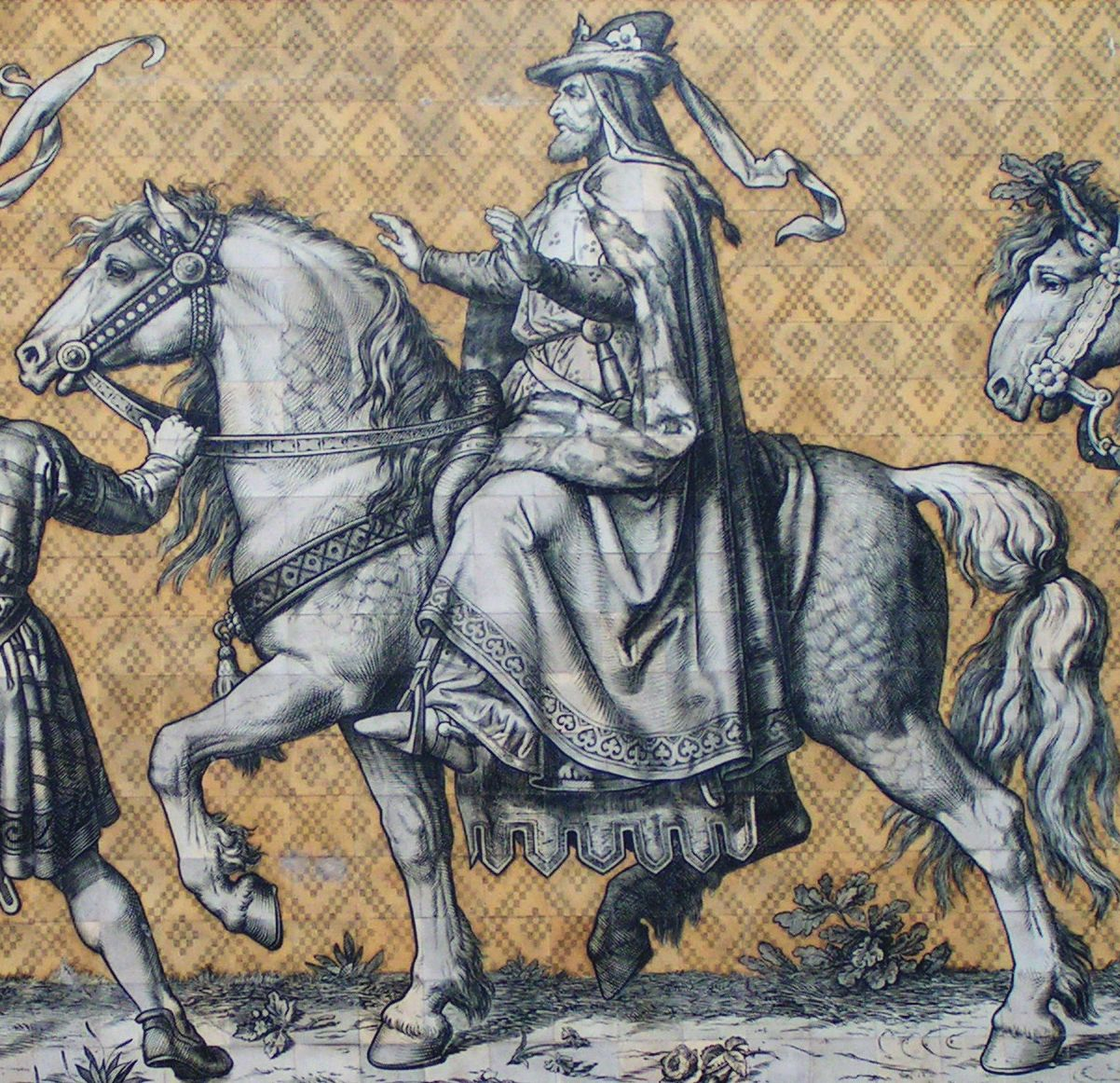
Conrad, Margrave of Meissen, the first ruler in the procession

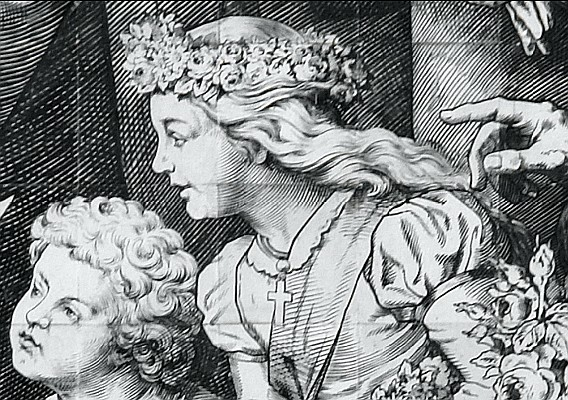
A girl in the children's group is the only female person in the Fürstenzug

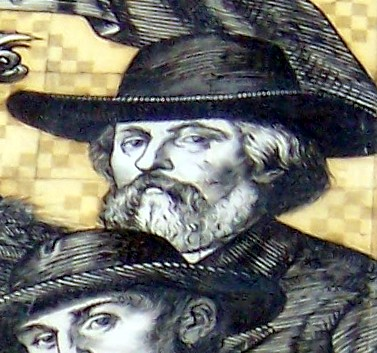
The creator Wilhelm Walther, the last person in the Fürstenzug

The 35 noblemen, Margraves, Electors, Dukes and Kings, are shown on horseback while foot soldiers and other people accompany them. The name of each ruler is inscribed below his image. Everyone depicted wears contemporary clothing.

- Conrad, Margrave of Meissen (1127–1156)
- Otto II, Margrave of Meissen (1156–1190)
- Albert, Margrave of Meissen (1190–1195)
- Dietrich I, Margrave of Meissen (1195–1221)
- Henry III, Margrave of Meissen (1221–1288)
- Albert II, Margrave of Meissen (1288–1307)
- Frederick I, Margrave of Meissen (1307–1324)
- Frederick II, Margrave of Meissen (1324–1349)
- Frederick III, Landgrave of Thuringia (1349–1381)
- Frederick I, Elector of Saxony (1381–1428)
- Frederick II, Elector of Saxony (1428–1464)
- Ernest, Elector of Saxony (1464–1486)
- Albert III, Duke of Saxony (1486–1500)
- Frederick III, Elector of Saxony (1486–1525)
- John, Elector of Saxony (1525–1532)
- John Frederick I, Elector of Saxony (1532–1547)
- George, Duke of Saxony (1500–1539)
- Henry IV, Duke of Saxony (1539–1541)
- Maurice, Elector of Saxony (1547–1553)
- Augustus, Elector of Saxony (1553–1586)
- Christian I, Elector of Saxony (1586–1591)
- Christian II, Elector of Saxony (1591–1611)
- John George I, Elector of Saxony (1611–1656)
- John George II, Elector of Saxony (1656–1680)
- John George III, Elector of Saxony (1680–1691)
- John George IV, Elector of Saxony (1691–1694)
- Augustus II the Strong (1694–1733)
- Augustus III of Poland (1733–1763)
- Frederick Christian, Elector of Saxony (1763)
- Frederick Augustus I of Saxony (1763–1827)
- Anthony of Saxony (1827–1836)
- Frederick Augustus II of Saxony (1836–1854)
- John of Saxony (1854–1873)
- Albert of Saxony (1873–1902)
- George of Saxony (1902–1904)

== Dimensions ==
The Fürstenzug is 101.9 metres (334 ft) long and 10.5 metres (34 ft) high. Due to 18 windows in the upper part, the tile area comprises 968 m^{2} (10,420 sq ft). Each tile measures 20.5 centimetres (8.1 in) by 20.5 centimetres (8.1 in). Hence, approximately 23,000 tiles are placed on the wall.

== See also ==
- List of rulers of Saxony
