= Albert I of Meissen =

Margrave of Meissen from 1190 to 1195

Albert I
- Margrave of Meissen
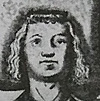
- Depiction of Albert's tomb slab (1692)
- Reign: 18 February 1190 – 1195
- Predecessor: Otto II
- Successor: Emperor Henry VI
- Born: 1158
- Died: 24 June 1195 (aged 36–37); Krummenhennersdorf, Meissen
- Buried: Altzella Abbey
- Noble family: Wettin
- Spouses: Sophie, daughter of Frederick, Duke of Bohemia
- Father: Otto II, Margrave of Meissen
- Mother: Hedwig of Brandenburg

Albert I, Margrave of Meissen, known as Albert the Proud (German: Albrecht der Stolze; 1158 – 24 June 1195), was a member of the House of Wettin who ruled as Margrave of Meissen from 1190 until his death.

== Life ==
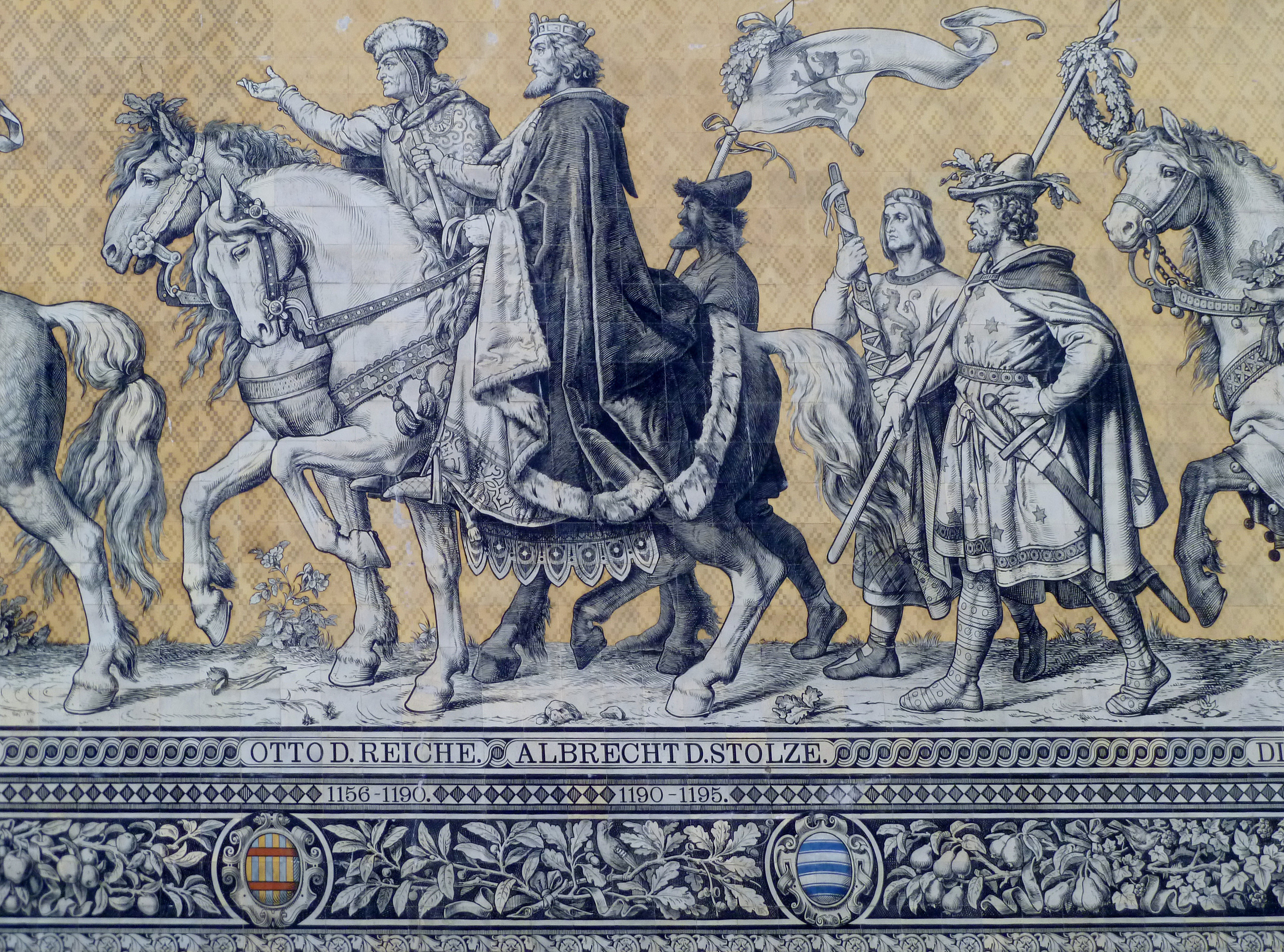
Otto the Rich and his son and Albert; Fürstenzug, Dresden

Albert was the eldest son of Margrave Otto the Rich (1156–1190) with his consort Hedwig of Brandenburg, a daughter of the Ascanian margrave Albert the Bear. In 1186 in Ústí nad Labem he married the Přemyslid princess Sophia, a daughter of Duke Frederick of Bohemia.

His father did not intend to let Albert succeed him in Meissen, openly preferring his younger brother Theodoric. Albert did not accept this and started a war against his father and brother. In 1188, he even took his father prisoner. Under the orders of the Hohenstaufen emperor Frederick Barbarossa, he had to set him free but in 1190 he was able to obtain the margravial title upon Otto's death.

Albert accompanied Barbarossa's son Henry VI on his campaign to Sicily; nevertheless, he quickly abandoned the Imperial forces and returned to Meissen when his brother tried to regain the margraviate. Theodoric, with the support of his father-in-law Landgrave Hermann of Thuringia, took up arms and defeated Albert's forces in a battle near Röblingen. The Margrave, in disguise as a monk, narrowly escaped to Leipzig and tried in vain to gain the support of furious Emperor Henry.

The fratricidal war ended when Albert suddenly died in June 1195, presumably poisoned, with no children to succeed him. He was buried in the Cistercian monastery of Altzella, established by his father in 1162. Meissen, with its rich mines, was seized by Emperor Henry VI as a princeless Imperial Estate. Not until 1198, Theodoric finally came into possession of his inheritance, following Henry's death in 1197.

== See also ==
- List of Margraves of Meißen
- Wettin (dynasty)

== Notes and references ==
Albert I of Meissen House of Wettin Born: 1158 Died: 24 June 1195
Preceded by Otto II	Margrave of Meissen; 1190–1195	Succeeded by Theodoric I
