= Constance of Hungary =

Queen of Bohemia from 1199 to 1230

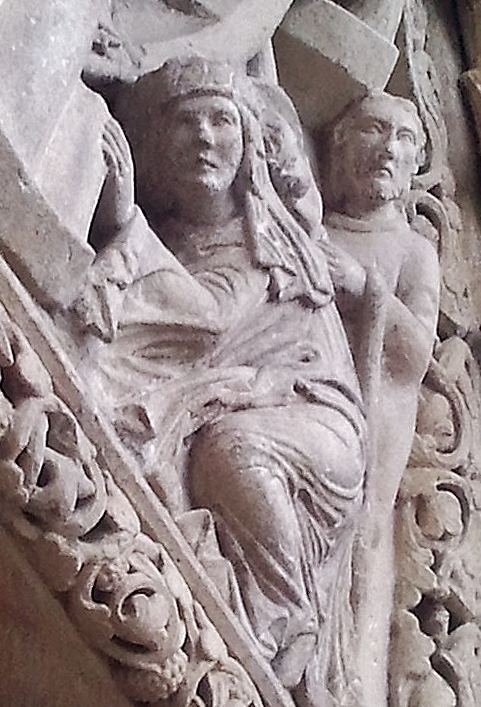
- Queen Constance on a tympanum in the Cistercian abbey Porta Coeli

Queen consort of Bohemia
- Tenure: 1199–1230
- Born: c. 1180; Hungary
- Died: 6 December 1240 (aged c. 60); Tišnov, Moravia
- Burial: Cloister Porta coeli
- Spouse: Ottokar I of Bohemia (m. 1199; died 1230)
- Issue: Wenceslaus I of Bohemia; Anna of Bohemia; Saint Agnes of Bohemia
- House: Árpád
- Father: Béla III of Hungary
- Mother: Agnes of Antioch

Constance of Hungary (in Hungarian, Konstancia; in Czech, Konstancie; c. 1180 – 6 December 1240) was the second Queen consort of Ottokar I of Bohemia.

== Family ==
Constance was a daughter of Béla III of Hungary and his first wife Agnes of Antioch. Her older siblings included Emeric, King of Hungary, Margaret of Hungary and Andrew II of Hungary.

== Marriage and children ==
In 1199, Ottokar I divorced his first wife, Adelaide of Meissen, on grounds of consanguinity. He married Constance later in the same year. Together with Ottokar, she had nine children.

Queen Constance is regularly noted as a co-donator with her husband in various documents of his reign. Her petitions to her husband for various donations are also recorded. She is considered to have sold the city Boleráz to her nephew Béla IV of Hungary. In 1247, Béla conferred said city to the nuns of Trnava. An epistle by which Constance supposedly grants freedom to the cities of Břeclav and Olomouc is considered a false document. The same epistle grants lands in Ostrovany to the monastery of St. Stephen of Hradište. Another epistle has the queen settling "honorable Teutonic men" (viros honestos Theutunicos) in the city of Hodonín and is also considered a forgery. In 1230, Ottokar I died and their son Wenceslaus succeeded him. Constance survived her husband by a decade.

In 1231, Pope Gregory IX set Queen Constance and her dower possessions under the protection of the Holy See. His letter to Constance clarifies said possessions to include the provinces of Břeclav (Brecyzlaviensem), Pribyslavice (Pribizlavensem), Dolni Kunice (Conowizensem), Godens (Godeninensem), Bzenec (Bisenzensem) and Budějovice (Budegewizensem). In 1232, Constance founded Cloister Porta Coeli near Tišnov and retired to it as a nun. She died within the Cloister.

== Issue ==
- Vratislav (c. 1200 – before 1209)
- Judith (c. 1202 – 2 June 1230), who married Bernhard von Spanheim, Duke of Carinthia
- Anna (c. 1204 – 23 June 1265), who married Henry II the Pious, Duke of Wrocław
- Agnes, thought to have died young
- Wenceslaus I of Bohemia (c. 1205 – 23 September 1253)
- Vladislaus, Margrave of Moravia (1207 – 10 February 1228)
- Přemysl, Margrave of Moravia (1209 – 16 October 1239), who married Margaret, daughter of Otto I, Duke of Merania, and Beatrice II, Countess of Burgundy
- Agnes (20 January 1211 – 6 March 1282), Mother Superior of the Franciscan Poor Clares nuns of Prague

The Milanese mystic Guglielma (1210s – 24 October 1281) claimed to be a Princess of Bohemia and has therefore been identified as a daughter of Ottokar and Constance with the name Vilemína or Božena, but there is an absence of any corroborating Bohemian documents.

== Sources ==
- Earenfight, Theresa (2013). Queenship in Medieval Europe. Palgrave Macmillan. ISBN 978-1137303929.
- Mielke, Christopher (2021). The Archaeology and Material Culture of Queenship in Medieval Hungary, 1000–1395. Springer International Publishing. ISBN 9783030665111.

Constance of Hungary House of Árpád Born: 1180? Died: 6 December 1240
Royal titles
Vacant Title last held by Adelaide of Meissen	Queen consort of Bohemia; 1199–1230	Succeeded by Kunigunde of Hohenstaufen
