= Altzella Abbey =

Cistercian monastery in Saxony, Germany

Coordinates: 51.060278°N 13.276544°E

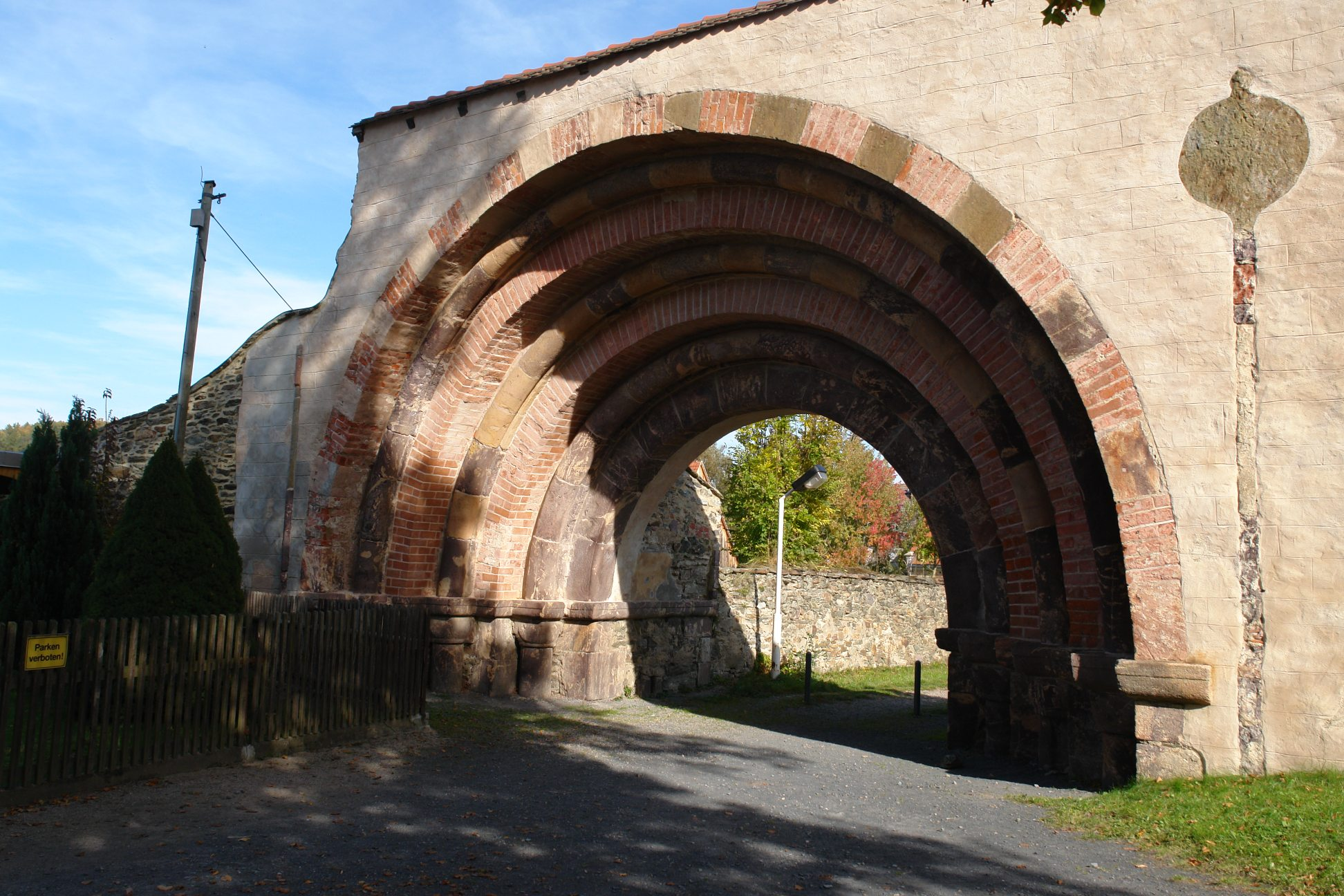
Romanesque entrance gateway

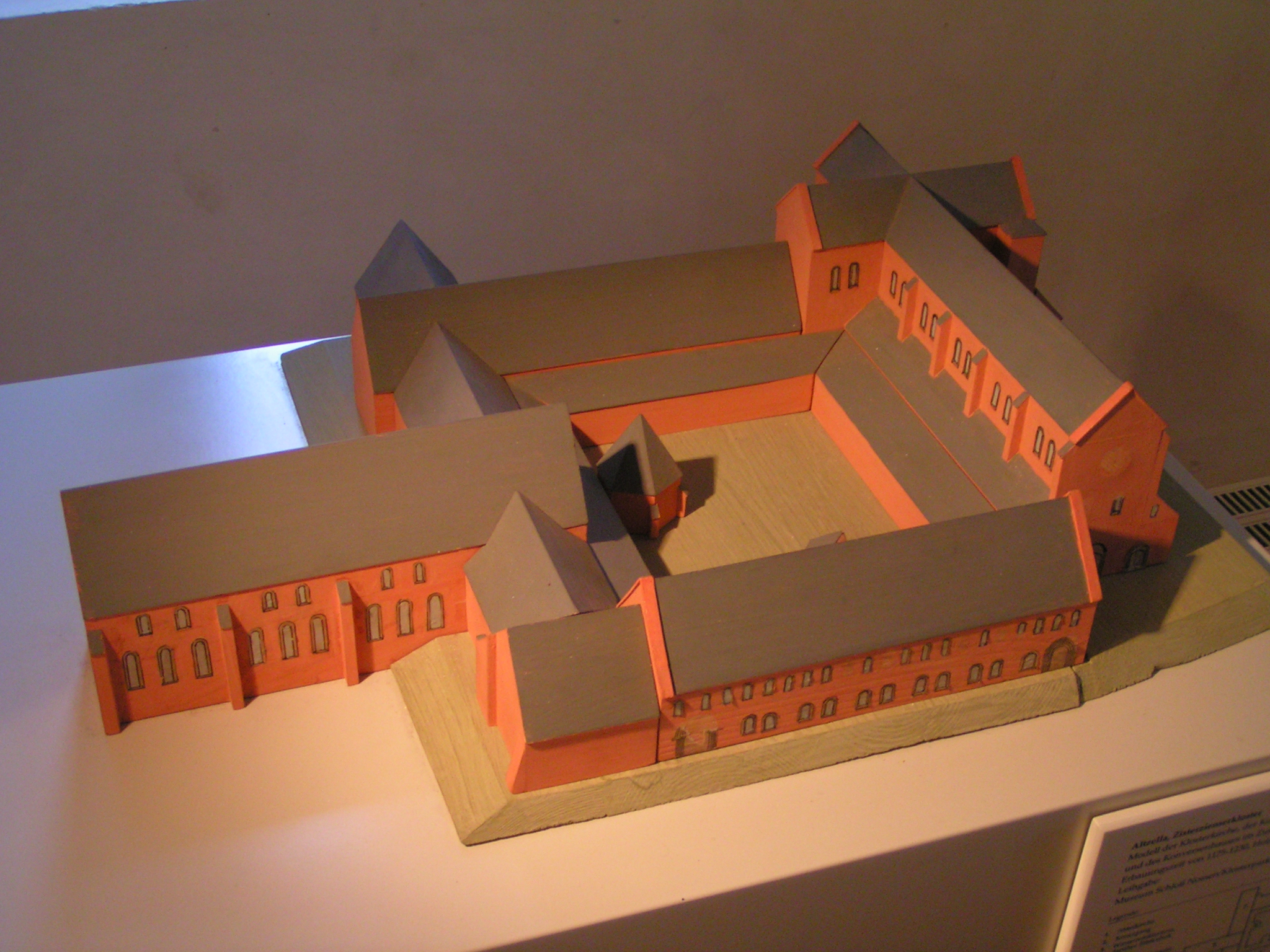
Model of the abbey church, the conventual buildings and the lay brothers' building as built c. 1175–1230

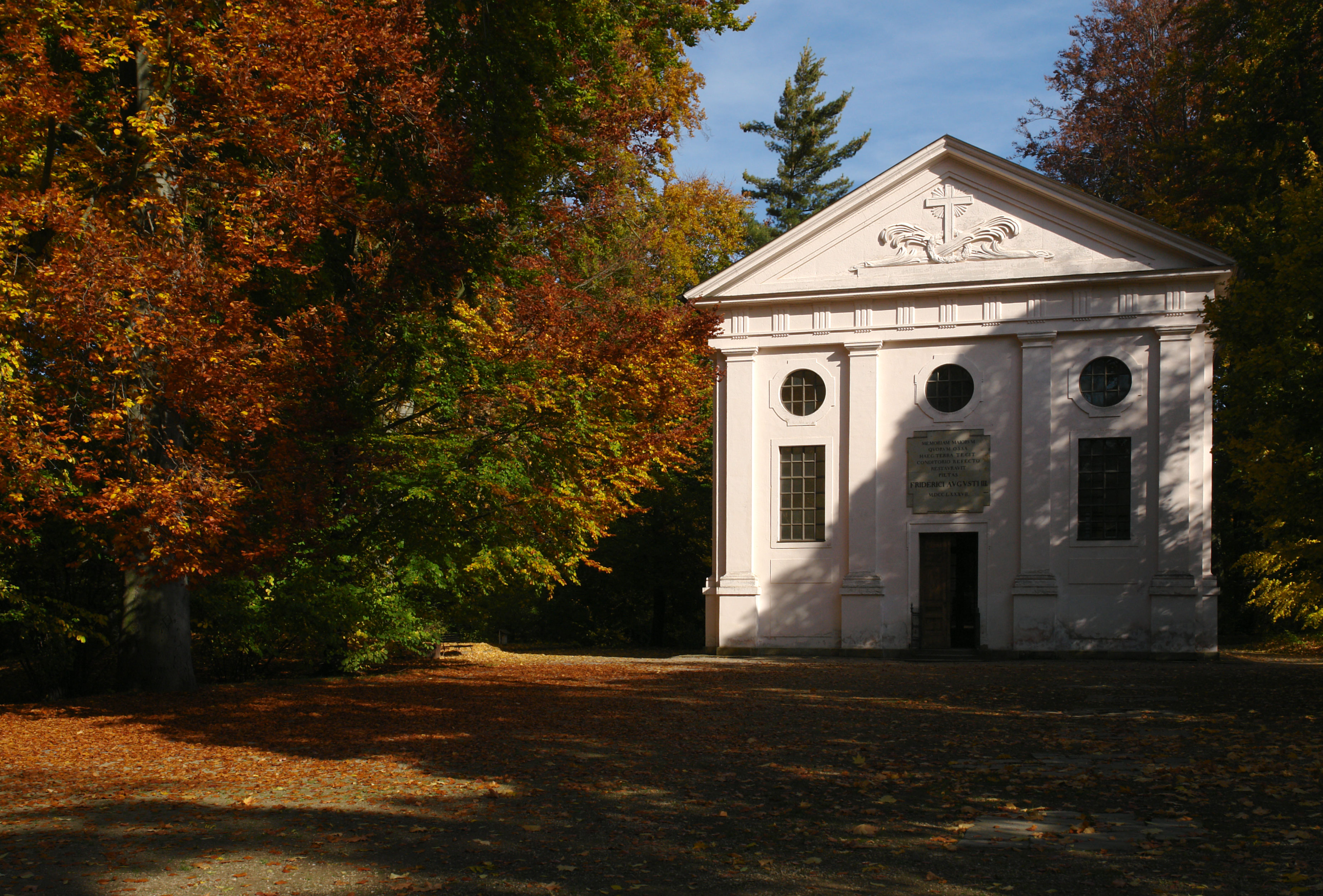
Mausoleum with the tombs of the Wettins

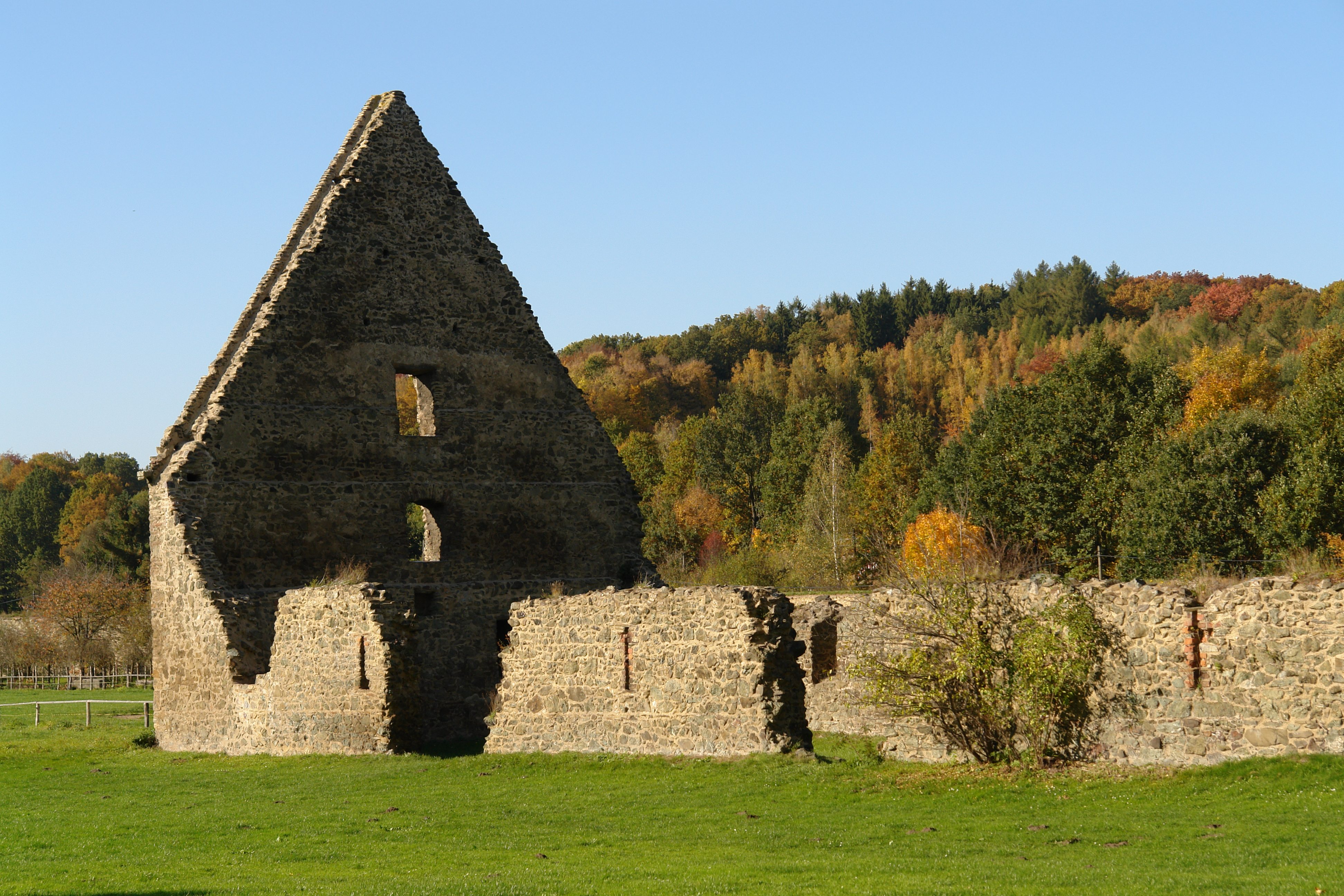
Former grainstore

Altzella Abbey, also Altzelle Abbey (German: Kloster Altzella or Altzelle, previously Cella or Cella Sanctae Mariae), is a former Cistercian monastery near Nossen in Saxony, Germany. The former abbey contains the tombs of the Wettin margraves of Meissen from 1190 to 1381.

The premises and gardens, surrounded by the precinct wall of the former monastery, and known as the Klosterpark Altzella, are now maintained by the Schloss Nossen/Kloster Altzella Administration, and consist of a Romantic park, ruins and restored buildings, used for various cultural and religious functions, such as Corpus Christi processions. It also hosts conferences and private functions.

== History ==
In 1162 Emperor Frederick I acquired 800 Hufen of cleared land from a monastery founded by Otto II, Margrave of Meissen, some of which was exchanged after the discovery of silver in 1168. In the following years, in accordance with the wishes of the founder, Hedwig of Brandenburg, wife of Otto of Meissen, the Cistercian Order undertook the establishment of an abbey on this land, into which in 1175 the first abbot with a community of twelve monks moved from Pforta Abbey (near Naumburg). The new foundation was known as Cella or Zelle Abbey (Kloster Cella or Zelle). Construction of the abbey church began at this time. An intense period of construction is evidenced between 1180 and 1230, when the conventual buildings and the Romanesque portal were built. The church was dedicated in 1198, a Brick Gothic building with three aisles and a transept. The west front shows Northern Italian influences.

In 1217 supervision of the Abbey of the Holy Cross (Kloster Heilig Kreuz) in Meissen, a Benedictine nunnery, was entrusted to the abbot of Zelle. In 1268 the abbey founded a daughter house near Guben, Neuzelle Abbey (Cella Nova), after which the name Cella Vetus, Altzelle or Altzella gradually came into use to distinguish the older house.

As early as 1190, when Otto of Meissen died and was entombed here, the abbey served as the burial place of the Wettins, for which purpose the Andreaskapelle ("St Andrew's Chapel") was later built, between 1339 and 1349. Both Frederick II, Margrave of Meissen, and his son Frederick III were buried there.

Under the abbots Vinzenz von Gruner and the humanist Martin von Lochau (abbot 1501 –1522) the abbey enjoyed its most flourishing period. In 1436 the abbey bought Nossen Castle (Schloss Nossen) with contents and appurtenances for 4,200 Gulden. The castle itself was in poor condition and was restructured to serve as the abbot's residence. The upper storey of the lay brothers' building was converted into a library in 1506.

In 1540 Henry IV, Duke of Saxony, ordered the secularisation of the abbey. Under Augustus, Elector of Saxony, and no later than 1557, large parts of the buildings, which were in poor condition, were demolished and the materials reused elsewhere. Only the lay brothers' building remained, later used for storing grain. Between 1676 and 1787 the Electors of Saxony disinterred the remains of their ancestors and had them re-buried in a memorial chapel, the present-day mausoleum. In about 1800 a Romantically landscaped park was established to form a picturesque setting for the building and the surrounding ruins.

== Bibliography ==
- Eduard Beyer: Cistercienser-Stift und Kloster Alt-Zelle in dem Bisthum Meißen. Dresden 1855 (Googlebooks)
- Susanne Geck: Zwischen Klostermauer und Klausur. Neue Erkenntnisse zur Bebauung von Altzella. in: Arbeits- und Forschungsberichte zur sächsischen Bodendenkmalpflege 45, 2003, pp. 383–442.
- Susanne Geck/Thomas Westphalen: Forschungen zum Zisterzienserkloster Altzella. In: 750 Jahre Kloster Marienstern. Halle (Saale) 1998, pp. 223–230.
- Tom Graber (ed.): Urkundenbuch des Zisterzienserklosters Altzelle. Vol. 1. 1162-1249 [Codex diplomaticus Saxoniae, Hauptteil 2, Bd. 19]. Hannover 2006. ISBN 3-7752-1901-3
- Tom Graber/Martina Schattkowsky (eds.): Die Zisterzienser und ihre Bibliotheken. Buchbesitz und Schriftgebrauch des Klosters Altzelle im europäischen Vergleich. Leipzig 2008. ISBN 3-86583-325-X
- Peter Landau: Der Entstehungsort des Sachsenspiegels: Eike von Repgow, Altzelle und die Anglo-normannische Kanonistik. In: Deutsches Archiv für Erforschung des Mittelalters, 61(2005), 1, pp. 73–101 (Googlebooks)
- Heinrich Magirius: Klosterpark Altzella. Reihe Sachsens schönste Schlösser, Burgen und Gärten 7, Leipzig 2000, ISBN 3-361-00525-6
- Heinrich Magirius: Die Baugeschichte des Klosters Altzella. Abhandlungen der Sächsischen Akademie der Wissenschaften zu Leipzig, Berlin 1962
- Martina Schattkowsky: Das Zisterzienserkloster Altzella 1162–1540. Studien zur Organisation und Verwaltung des klösterlichen Grundbesitzes, Studien zur katholischen Bistums- und Klostergeschichte, vol. 27, Leipzig 1985
- Martina Schattkowsky: Zur Bedeutung der Grangienwirtschaft für das Zisterzienserkloster Altzella in der Mark Meißen (1162–1540). in: Jahrbuch für Geschichte des Feudalismus 10, Berlin 1986
- Martina Schattkowsky / André Thieme (eds.): Zisterzienserabtei in Mitteldeutschland und Hauskloster der Wettiner. Wissenschaftliche Tagung anlässlich der 825. Wiederkehr des Initium des Klosters Altzelle 5.–6. Mai 2000. Schriften zur sächsischen Landesgeschichte 3, Leipzig 2002, ISBN 3-935693-55-9.
- Altzella – Benediktinerkloster, Stiftskirche und Grablege der Wettiner in: Helga Wäß: Form und Wahrnehmung mitteldeutscher Gedächtnisskulptur im 14. Jahrhundert: Band 1: Ein Beitrag zu mittelalterlichen Grabmonumenten, Epitaphen und Kuriosa: Ein Beitrag zu mittelalterlichen Grabmonumenten, Epitaphen und Kuriosa in Sachsen, Sachsen-Anhalt, Thüringen, Nord-Hessen, Ost-Westfalen und Südniedersachsen in two volumes, Vol. 2: Katalog ausgewählter Objekte vom Hohen Mittelalter bis zum Anfang des 15. Jahrhunderts, Bristol u. a. 2006, Altzella, pp. 26 ff. and Kat. Nr. 4–19, with many illustrations of the tombstones. ISBN 3-86504-159-0
- Harald Winkel: Herrschaft und Memoria. Die Wettiner und ihre Hausklöster im Mittelalter. Leipzig 2010. ISBN 3-86583-439-6
- Schumann, August (1830). "Kloster-Zelle". Vollständiges Staats-, Post- und Zeitungslexikon von Sachsen (in German). Vol. 17. Zwickau. p. 413.
