= Vladislaus III of Bohemia =

Duke of Bohemia (c. 1160 – 1222)

Vladislaus III
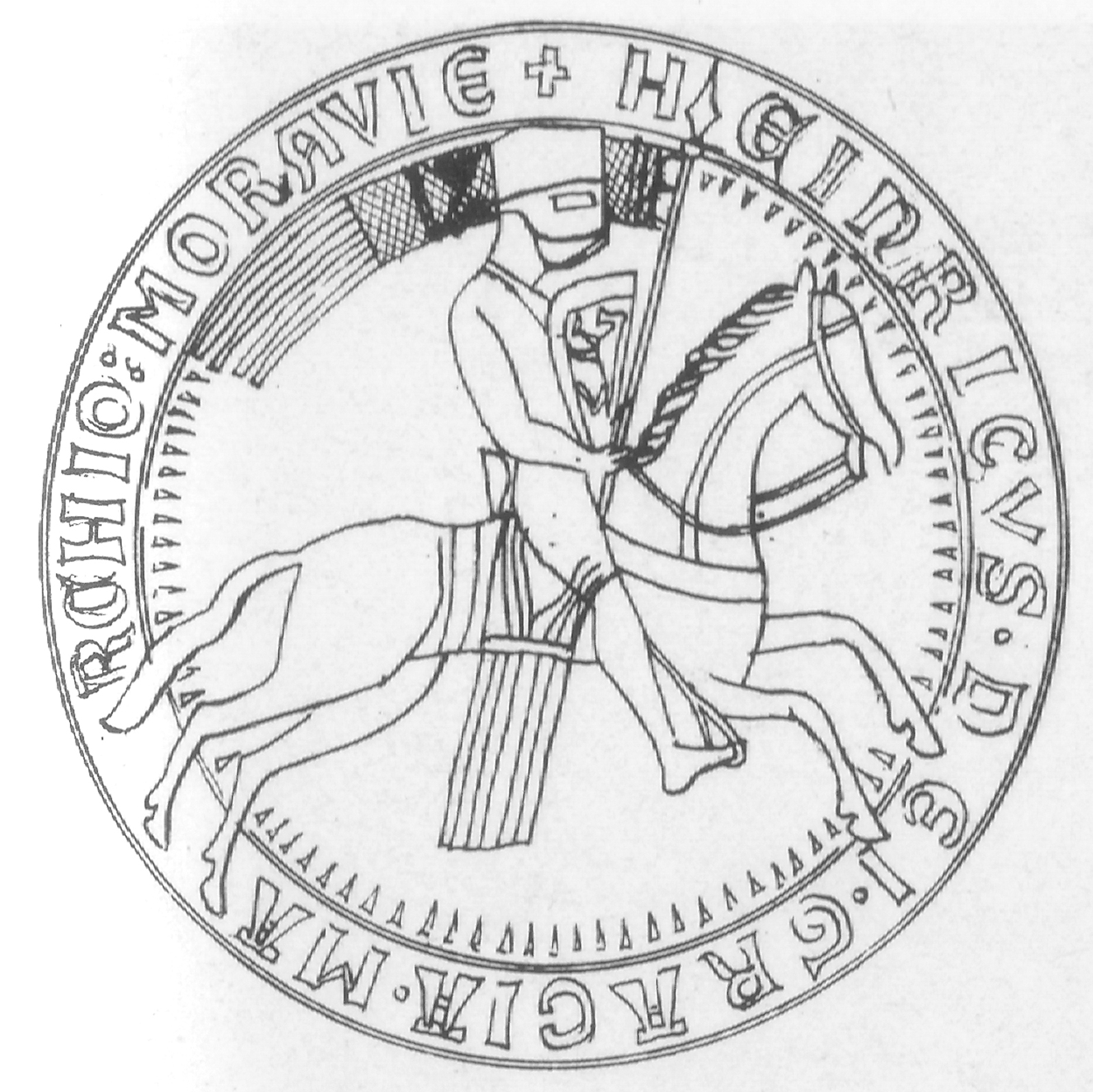
- Seal of Margrave Vladislaus Henry

Duke of Bohemia
- Reign: 22 June – 6 December 1197
- Predecessor: Bretislaus III
- Successor: Ottokar I
- Born: c. 1160
- Died: 12 August 1222 (aged 61–62); Znojmo, Moravia
- Burial: Velehrad Abbey
- Spouse: Heilwida
- Dynasty: Přemyslid
- Father: Vladislaus II, Duke of Bohemia
- Mother: Judith of Thuringia
- Religion: Roman Catholicism

Vladislaus Henry (Czech: Vladislav Jindřich; c. 1160 – 12 August 1222), a member of the Přemyslid dynasty, was elected Duke of Bohemia (as "Vladislaus III") in 1197 and Margrave of Moravia from 1197 until his death. He only served as duke during the year 1197 and was indeed the last ruler of Bohemia to hold that title. It was his brother Ottokar I, whose forces overthrew him, who finally achieved the elevation of the Duchy of Bohemia to the status of a kingdom starting in 1198.

== Early life ==
Vladislaus Henry was the second son of Duke Vladislaus II from his second marriage with Judith of Thuringia, thereby the younger brother of Ottokar I. He grew up during a frivolous time, for the complex personal relationship his father had with the emperor, Frederick Barbarossa, was leading to a tragic termination. During the late 12th century struggles within the Přemyslid dynasty, he supported his older brother Ottokar when he seized the Bohemian duchy in 1192. In turn, Ottokar appointed Vladislaus, Prince of Brno and Znojmo since 1191, a margrave of Moravia with the consent of Emperor Henry VI. However, the two never paid the demanded sum and so were again deposed in June 1193 by a decision of the Imperial Diet at Worms, which appointed their cousin, the Prague bishop Henry Bretislaus, as duke. Vladislaus was summoned to Prague Castle, where he had to spend the following years suspiciously eyed by Duke Bretislaus.

== Reign ==
After the death of Emperor Henry VI and Bretislaus in 1197, Vladislaus was released and elected duke on 22 June 1197, with his brother in attendance. Faced with an uprising in favour of Ottokar, Vladislaus abdicated a few months later, on 6 December. The brothers then very nearly came to war, but, their armies encamped facing each other, the two met and negotiated a solution whereby Ottokar took the Bohemian throne–though without imperial approval–and compensated Vladislaus with the hereditary margravial title of near-autonomous Moravia. By his repudiation of the throne, Vladislaus helped to bring an end to the destructive dynastic wars of the Přemyslids, which had lasted for over twenty-five years from the death of his father. His status as a Prince of the Holy Roman Empire was acknowledged in the 1212 Golden Bull of Sicily.

Vladislaus held Moravia until his death twenty five years thence, in close co-operation with his brother. He reinforced his rule, when he had the rivalling claimant Prince Spytihněv III of Brno blinded and installed his own confessor, Daniel Milík, as Bishop of Prague, the first investiture by a reigning prince in Bohemia. Daniel played a vital role in the reconciliation between Vladislaus and Ottokar; despite several protests to the Roman Curia, he held the see until 1214 without receiving imperial nomination. In 1205, Vladislaus founded the Cistercian abbey of Velehrad as a family monastery and burial ground of the Moravian margraves.

Vladislaus was married with one Heilwida (Hedwig), of unknown origin. He died without issue at his court in Znojmo, whereafter the Moravian margraviate fell back to King Ottokar I, who enfeoffed it to his younger son Vladislaus II. Vladislaus was buried at Velehrad Abbey.

== Sources ==
- Wihoda, Martin (2015). Vladislaus Henry: The Formation of Moravian Identity. BRILL. ISBN 978-9004303836.

Vladislaus III of Bohemia Přemyslid dynasty Born: c. 1136 Died: 9 September 1191
Preceded by Bretislaus III	Duke of Bohemia; 1197	Succeeded by Ottokar I
Vacant Title last held by Conrad II	Margrave of Moravia; 1197–1222	Succeeded by Vladislaus II
