= Jutta of Thuringia =

- Born: 1184
- Died: 6 August 1235; Schleusingen
- Noble family: Ludovingians
- Spouses: Dietrich I, Margrave of Meissen; Poppo VII of Henneberg
- Issue Detail: Henry the Illustrious; Herman I of Henneberg
- Father: Hermann I, Landgrave of Thuringia
- Mother: Sophia of Sommerschenburg

Jutta of Thuringia (1184 – 6 August 1235) was the eldest daughter of Landgrave Hermann I of Thuringia and his first wife, Sophia of Sommerschenburg, a daughter of Fredrick II of Sommerschenburg.

Before 1197, she married Margrave Dietrich I of Meissen.

After her husband's death in 1221, she had a dispute with her brother, Landgrave Louis IV of Thuringia, who was very eager to act as regent and guardian for her three-year-old son Landgrave Henry III.

In 1223, she married her second husband, Count Poppo VII of Henneberg.

Jutta of Thuringia died on 6 August 1235 in Schleusingen.

== Marriages and issue ==
Children from her marriage to Dietrich I of Meissen:

1. Hedwig (d. 1249) married Count Dietrich V of Cleves (1185–1260)
2. Otto (died before 1215)
3. Sophia (d. 1280) married Count Henry of Henneberg-Schleusingen (d. 1262)
4. Jutta
5. Henry the Illustrious (1218–1288) Margrave of Meissen

Children from her marriage with Poppo VII of Henneberg:

1. Herman I of Henneberg (1224–1290)

== Sources ==
- Ancelet-Hustache, Jeanne (1963). Gold Tried by Fire: St. Elizabeth of Hungary. Franciscan Herald Press.
- Holladay, Joan A. (2019). Visualizing Ancestry in the High and Late Middle Ages. Cambridge University Press.
- Lyon, Jonathan R. (2013). Princely Brothers and Sisters: The Sibling Bond in German Politics, 1100-1250. Cornell University Press.
- Rasmussen, Ann Marie (1997). Mothers and Daughters in Medieval German Literature. Syracuse University Press.
