= Vladislaus II of Moravia =

Vladislaus II (Czech: Vladislav II.; 1207 – 18 February 1227 or 1228) was the margrave of Moravia from 1222 to his death. He was member of the Přemyslid dynasty, son of King Ottokar I of Bohemia and his second wife, Constance of Hungary.

== Literature ==
- Novotný, Václav. České dějiny I./III. Čechy královské za Přemysla I. a Václava I. Prague : Jan Laichter, 1928. 1085 p.
- Vaníček, Vratislav. Velké dějiny zemí Koruny české II. 1197-1250. Prague : Paseka, 2000. 582 p. ISBN 80-7185-273-2.
- Žemlička, Josef. Počátky Čech královských 1198-1253. Prague : Nakladatelství Lidové noviny, 2002. 964 p. ISBN 80-7106-140-9.
- Žemlička, Josef. Přemysl Otakar I. Panovník, stát a česká společnost na prahu vrcholného feudalismu. Prague : Nakladatelství Svoboda, 1990. 361 p. ISBN 80-205-0099-5.
- Žemlička, Josef. Století posledních Přemyslovců. Prague : Melantrich, 1998. 412 p. ISBN 80-7023-281-1.

Vladislaus II of Moravia Přemyslid dynasty Born: 1207 Died: 18 February 1227/28
Preceded by Vladislaus I	Margrave of Moravia; 1222–1227/28	Succeeded by Přemysl
