= Golden Bull of Sicily =

1212 decree by Holy Roman Emperor Frederick II affirming Ottokar I as king of Bohemia

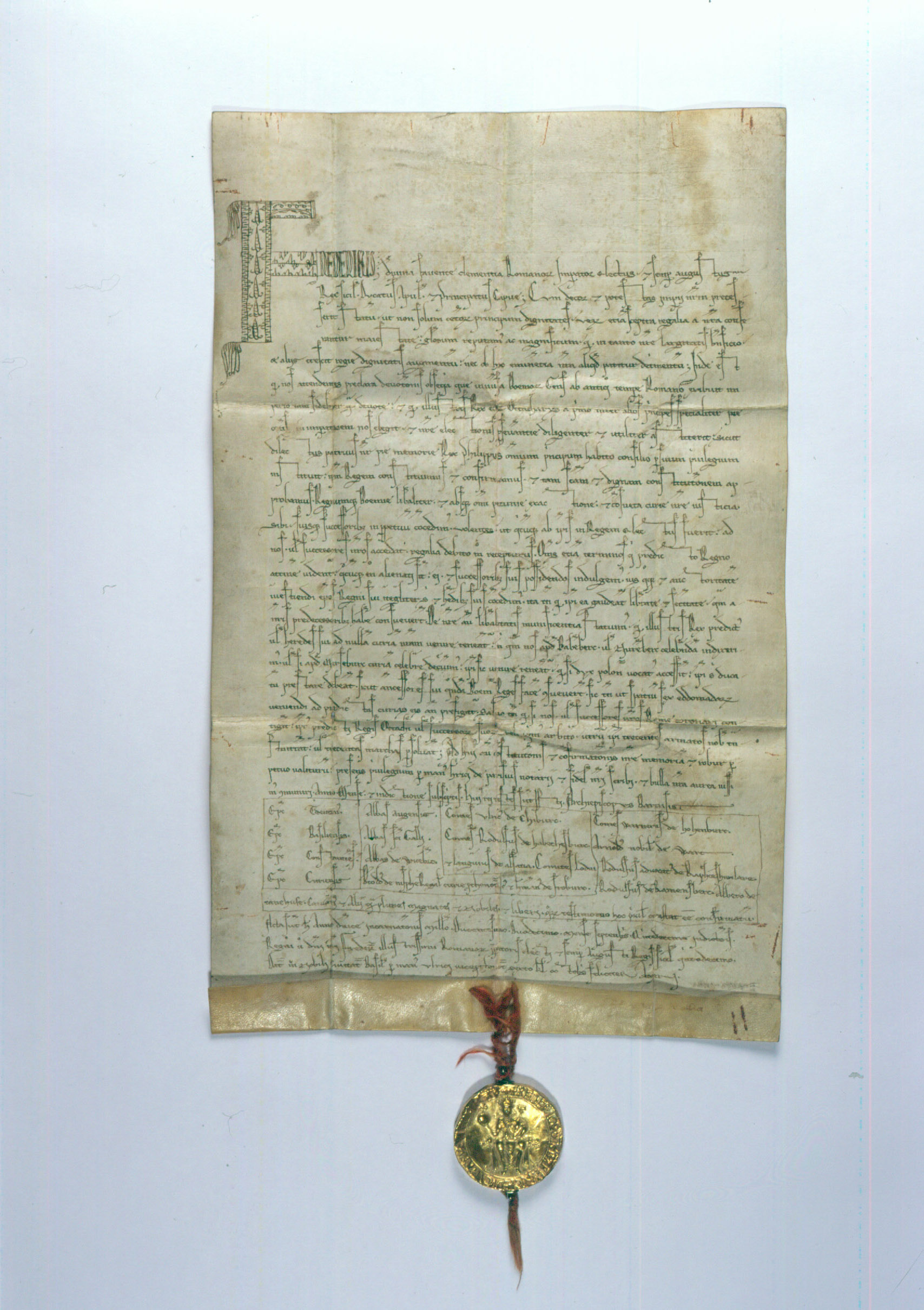
- Created: 26 September 1212; Basel
- Location: National Archives, Prague
- Signatories: Frederick II, Holy Roman Emperor and King of Sicily
- Purpose: Confirmation of the hereditary royal title held by Ottokar I of Bohemia

The Golden Bull of Sicily (Czech: Zlatá bula sicilská; Latin: Bulla Aurea Siciliæ) was a decree issued by the King of Sicily and future Emperor Frederick II in Basel on 26 September 1212 that confirmed the royal title obtained by Ottokar I of Bohemia in 1198, declaring him and his heirs kings of Bohemia. The kingship signified the exceptional status of Bohemia within the Holy Roman Empire.

Ottokar's Přemyslid ancestor Vratislaus II had already been elevated to kingship by Emperor Henry IV in 1085 at the diet in Mainz. He was crowned at Prague by Archbishop Egilbert of Trier the next year, the title however was not hereditary and upon his death in 1092, his brother Conrad I succeeded him again as duke. In 1158 Vratislaus' grandson Vladislaus II achieved kingship again, bestowed by Emperor Frederick Barbarossa, whom he had accompanied on his Italian campaign against Milan, but failed to secure the succession of his eldest son Frederick.

In September 1198 Frederick's younger half-brother Ottokar I made use of the rivalry among Otto IV from the House of Welf and the Hohenstaufen duke Philip of Swabia, youngest son of Emperor Frederick Barbarossa, who both had been elected King of the Romans. He received the hereditary royal title from Philip for his support and, maneuvering between both sides, achieved the acknowledgement by Otto IV as well as by Pope Innocent III. After the assassination of Philip and the papal ban imposed on Otto IV in 1210, Ottokar again switched sides, when he and several princes in 1211 convened at Nuremberg and elected the young Hohenstaufen scion Frederick II alium imperatorem ("Other Emperor"). Frederick, then king of Sicily, left for his coronation in Germany, reaching Basel in September 1212. Here he issued the Golden Bull that confirmed the kingship of Ottokar I and his heirs in Bohemia.

According to the Golden Bull of Sicily, the estates of Bohemia and Moravia were an autonomous and indivisible constituent of the Holy Roman Empire. The king of Bohemia was no longer subject to appointment by the emperor, and was only required to attend Reichstag diets close to the Bohemian border. Although a subject of the Holy Roman Empire, the Bohemian king was to be the premier prince-elector (Kurfürst) of the Empire and to furnish all subsequent emperors with a bodyguard of 300 knights when they went to Rome for their coronation. By this act Frederick II also declared that he and the Empire will give the investiture for Bohemia only to a ruler approved by the people of the country.

When in 1346 King Charles IV united the rule over Bohemia and Germany in his hands, he established the Crown of Bohemia, which remained beyond the Empire's suzerainty and were not considered Imperial States.

As part of the 800th anniversary of the document's signature, the document was put on public display at the National Archive for four days in September 2012.

== See also ==
- Golden Bull of 1356
- History of the Lands of the Bohemian Crown (Middle Ages)

== Sources ==
- Merinsky, Zdenek; Meznik, Jaroslav (1998). "The making of the Czech state: Bohemia and Moravia from the tenth to the fourteenth centuries". In Teich, Mikulas (ed.). Bohemia in History. Cambridge University Press.
- Pleszczynski, Andrzej (2011). The Birth of a Stereotype: Polish Rulers and their Country in German Writings c. 1000 A.D. Brill.
