= Ostsiedlung =

Early and High Middle Age German migration movement to the East

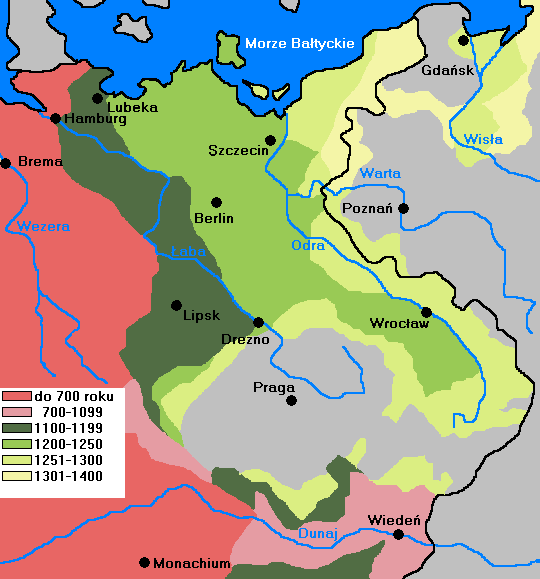
Stages of German eastern settlement in pink and four shades of green; the black line represents Holy Roman Empire borders in 1348

Ostsiedlung (German pronunciation: [ˈɔstˌziːdlʊŋ], lit. 'East settlement') is the term for the early medieval and high medieval migration of ethnic Germans and Germanization of the areas populated by Slavic, Baltic and Uralic peoples; the most settled area is sometimes known today as Germania Slavica. Germanization efforts included eastern parts of Francia, East Francia, and the Holy Roman Empire and beyond; and the consequences for settlement development and social structures in the areas of settlement. Other regions were also settled, though not as heavily. The Ostsiedlung encompassed multiple modern and historical regions, primarily Germany east of the Saale and Elbe rivers, the states of Lower Austria and Styria in Austria, Poland and the Czech Republic, but also in other parts of Central and Eastern Europe.

The majority of Ostsiedlung settlers settled individually at various stages. Many settlers were encouraged and invited by the local princes and regional lords, who sometimes even expelled previously settled people to make room for German settlers. (Note: "The German settlement was preceded in some areas by military conquest and the ejection of the indigenous population. Elsewhere, however, it was the native princes who invited in settlers and even expelled part of the indigenous population to make way for the newcomers.") Germanization also took place, particularly in Prussia, with an estimated 80% of German-speaking East Prussians having Baltic or Slavic paternal origins in 1910.

Smaller groups of migrants first moved to the east during the early Middle Ages. Larger treks of settlers, which included scholars, monks, missionaries, craftsmen and artisans, often invited, in numbers unverifiable, first moved eastwards during the mid-12th century. The military territorial conquests and punitive expeditions of the Ottonian and Salian emperors during the 11th and 12th centuries do not form part of the Ostsiedlung, as these actions did not result in noteworthy settlement establishment east of the Elbe and Saale rivers. The Ostsiedlung is considered to have been a purely Medieval event as it ended in the beginning of the 14th century. The legal, cultural, linguistic, religious and economic changes caused by the movement had a profound influence on the history of Eastern Central Europe between the Baltic Sea and the Carpathians until the 20th century.

In the 20th century, accounts of the Ostsiedlung were heavily exploited by German nationalists, most notoriously the Nazis, to press the territorial claims of Germany and to demonstrate supposed German superiority over non-Germanic peoples, whose cultural, urban and scientific achievements in that era were undermined, rejected, or presented as German. After World War I (1914–1918), the fact that Germany and Austria lost part of their territories in the East appeared as a counterpoint to Ostsiedlung because some of the Germans in the East became foreign citizens when their homes were no longer part of Germany and Austria. The Germans in the East outside Germany and Austria were partially forced to leave and the regions that Germany and Austria lost in the East were dominated by non-German peoples.

In the aftermath of World War II (1944–1950), Ostsiedlung was reversed east of the Oder river. Germans were driven out and deported to a reduced postwar Germany, leading to the loss of their language and culture in most affected areas. This included the German-dominated lands which Germany lost after this war where German populations had settled during the Ostsiedlung. Notable exceptions remained in parts of Eastern Austria and particularly in Eastern Germany west of the Oder.

== Early medieval Central Europe ==
During the 4th and 5th centuries, in what is known as the Migration Period, Germanic peoples seized control of the decaying Western Roman Empire in the South and established new kingdoms within it. Meanwhile, formerly Germanic areas in Eastern Europe and present-day Eastern Germany, were settled by Slavs.

=== Under Carolingian rule ===
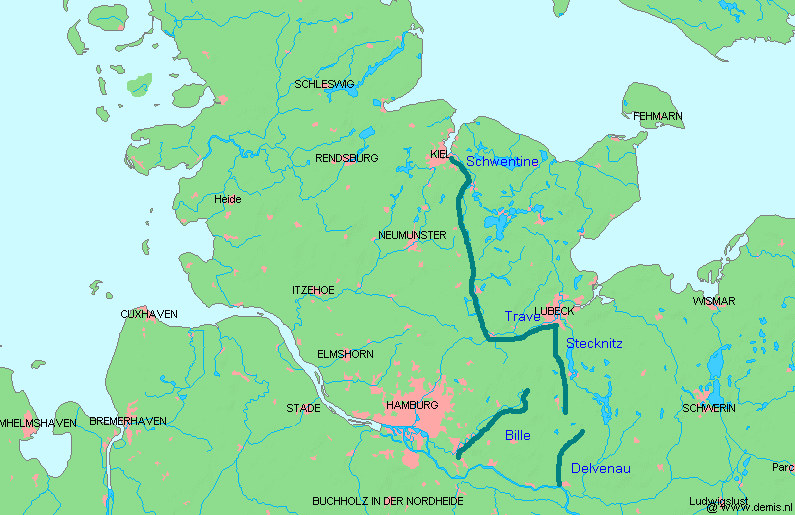
The Limes Saxoniae border between the Saxons and the Slavic Obotrites, established about 810

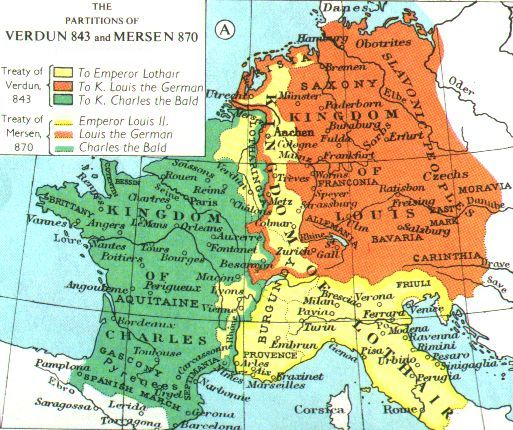
The division of the Carolingian Empire, Treaty of Verdun, 843

Charlemagne, ruler of the Carolingian Empire of Francia, which was founded by Franks (a Germanic people), under whom most of Western and Central continental Europe had been united during the 8th and 9th centuries, created numerous border territories, so called marches (German: Marken), where a substantial portion of the Ostsiedlung would later take place. The territories (from north to south):

- the Danish March (south of the Danevirke and Kovirke fortifications, between the Eider and Eckernförde), against the Danes and Jutes
- the Saxon Eastern March or Nordalbingen March between the Eider and Elbe in what is now Holstein against the Obotrites
- the Thuringian or Sorbian March on the Saale, against the Sorbs dwelling behind the limes sorabicus
- the Franconian march in what is now Upper Franconia, against the Czechs
- the Avar March between the Enns and the Vienna Woods (the later Austrian March), against the Avars
- the March of Pannonia east of Vienna (divided into Upper and Lower)
- the Carantanian march
- the Friulian march

This was the earliest recorded and planned "eastern policy" under Charlemagne, who wanted to protect the eastern border of the Frankish Empire, and also wanted to solidify his position in the east by declaring war on the Obotrites and Wilzes in the North, as well as on the Sorbs (east of Thuringia) and Czech tribal princes. However, since the goal wasn't to establish an ethnic and linguistic boundary between the Slavs and Germanic tribes, Slavic settlement continued in Thuringia and Northern Bavaria, with individual Slavs even making it to the Rhine Basin.

The tribes that populated these marches were generally unreliable allies of the Empire, and successor kings led numerous, yet not always successful, military campaigns to maintain their authority.

In 843, the Carolingian Empire was partitioned into three independent kingdoms as a result of dissent among Charlemagne's three grandsons over the continuation of the custom of partible inheritance or the introduction of primogeniture.

=== East Francia and Holy Roman Empire ===
Louis the German inherited the eastern territories, East Francia, that included all lands east of the Rhine river and to the north of Italy, which roughly corresponded with the territories of the German stem duchies, that formed a federation under the first king Henry the Fowler (919 to 936). The Slavs living within the reach of East Francia (since 962 C.E. the Holy Roman Empire), collectively called Wends or "Elbe Slavs", seldom formed larger political entities. They rather constituted various small tribes, settling as far west as to a line from the Eastern Alps and Bohemia to the Saale and Elbe rivers. As the East Frankish kingdom expanded, various Wendish tribes, that were conquered or allied with the Eastern Franks, such as the Obotrites, aided the Franks in defeating the West Germanic Saxons. The Carolingian tradition of setting up marches at the periphery of the empire would be continued by the East Frankish and Holy Roman Empire's kings during the 11th and 12th centuries.

Under the rule of King Louis the German and Arnulf of Carinthia, the first groups of civilian Catholic settlers were led by Franks and Bavarii to the lands of Pannonia (present-day Burgenland, Hungary, Slovakia and Slovenia).

In a series of punitive actions, large territories in the northeast between the Elbe, Saale, Naab rivers in the west and the Oder, Bober, Kwisa and Vltava rivers in the east were conquered (see also: Battle on the Raxa), and border marches were established in these areas. Fortifications were occupied and new castles built, reinforced by military units to exert military control and collect tributes. Christianization was limited to the establishment of mission dioceses such as Lübeck, Brandenburg or Havelberg. The development of a parish church system only took place after the settlement of German colonists, beginning in the 2nd half of the 12th century. Control over areas that had already been conquered was repeatedly lost. The Slavic revolt of 983 and an uprising of the Obotrites in 1066 had particularly serious consequences.

=== Slavic revolt of 983 ===
In 983, the Polabian Slavs in the Billung and Northern Marches, stretching from the Elbe river to the Baltic Sea succeeded in a rebellion against the political rule and Christian mission of the recently established Holy Roman Empire. In spite of their new-won independence, the Obotrites, Rani, Liutizian and Hevelli tribes were soon faced with internal struggles and warfare as well as raids from the newly constituted and expanding Piast dynasty (the early Polish) state from the east, Denmark from the north and the Empire from the west, eager to reestablish her marches. The area remained under rule of the Polabian tribes and uncolonized and unchristianized into the 12th century.

=== Eastern marches of East Francia and Holy Roman Empire ===
The territories (from north to south):

- the Billung March on the Baltic Sea, stretching approximately from Groswin to Schleswig
- Marca Geronis (march of Gero), a precursor of the Saxon Eastern March, later divided into smaller marches (the Northern March, which later was reestablished as Margraviate of Brandenburg; the March of Lusatia and the Margravate of Meissen in what is now Saxony; the March of Zeitz; the March of Merseburg; the Milzener March around Bautzen)
- Austrian March (marcha Orientalis, the "Eastern March" or "Bavarian Eastern March" (German: Ostmark) in what is now lower Austria)
- the Carantania or March of Styria
- the Drau March (Maribor and Ptuj)
- the Sann March (Celje)
- the Krain or Carniola march, also Windic March and White Carniola (White March), in what is now Slovenia

== Eastern Saxon Marches ==
The Sorbian March east of the Saale river was established in the 9th century. King Otto I designated a larger area – the Saxon Eastern March – in 937, that encompassed the territory between the Elbe, the Oder and the Peene rivers. Governed by Margrave Gero, it is also referred to as Marca Geronis. After Gero's death in 965, the march was divided in smaller sectors: Northern March, Lusatian March, Margraviate of Meissen, and March of Zeitz. The march was populated by various West Slavic tribes, the largest being Polabian Slavs tribes in the north and Sorbian tribes in the south.

The Margravate of Meissen and Transylvania were populated by German settlers, beginning in the 12th century. From the end of the 12th century onwards, monasteries and cities were established in Pomerania, Brandenburg, Silesia, Bohemia, Moravia and eastern Austria. In the Baltics, the Teutonic Order founded a crusader state in the beginning of the 13th century.

== Northeastern Germany and Holstein ==
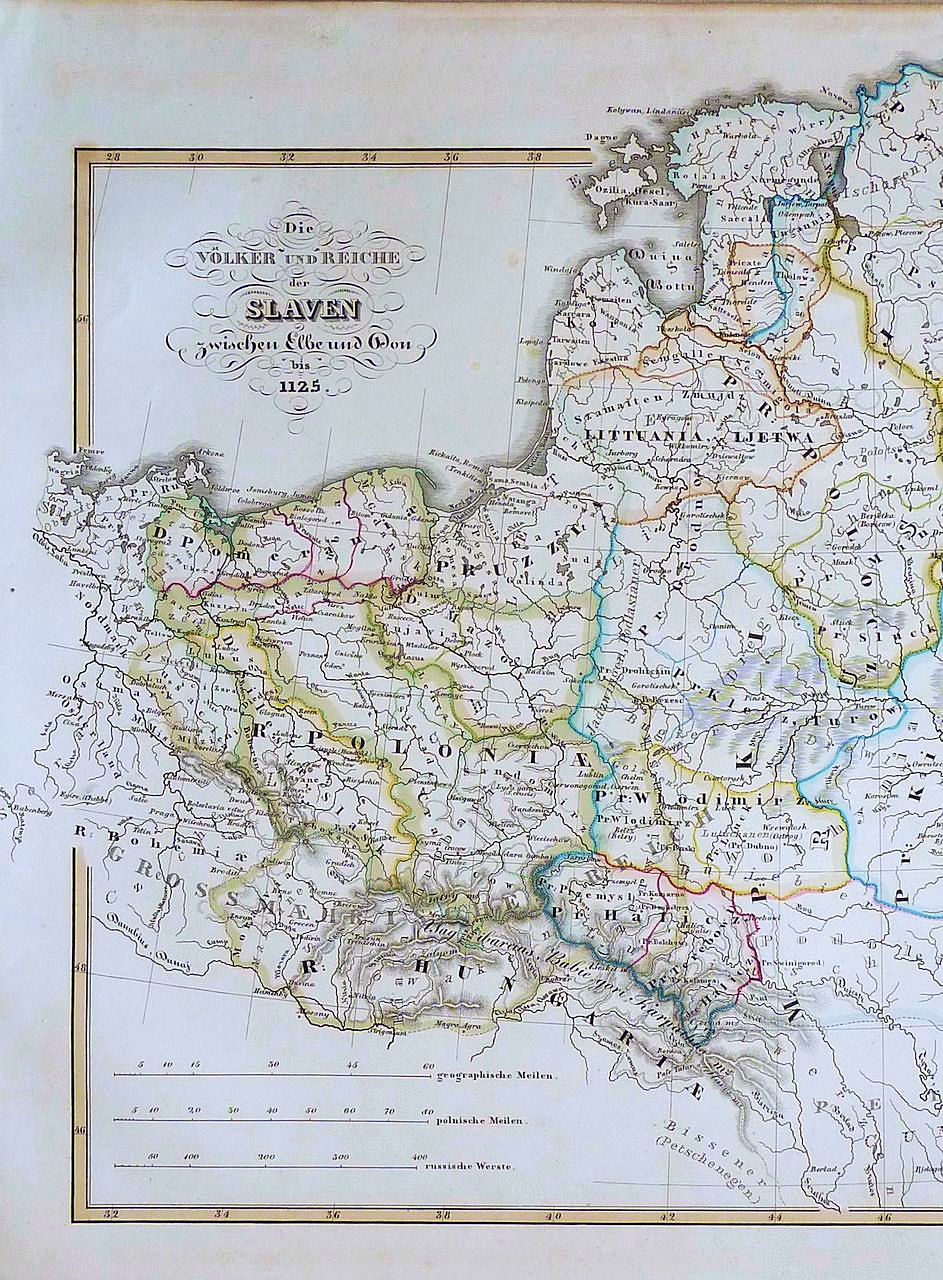
West-Slavic peoples in Europe until 1125 (yellow borders). Prussia (identified as Pruzzia) has not been a Slavic, but Baltic land.

=== Background ===
A call for a crusade against the Wends in 1108, probably coming from a Flemish clerk in the circles of the archbishop of Magdeburg, which included the prospect of profitable land gains for new settlers, had no noticeable effect and resulted in neither a military campaign nor a movement of settlers into the area.

Although the first settlers had already arrived in 1124, being mostly of Flemish and Dutch origin, they settled south of the Eider river, followed by the conquest of the land of the Wagri in 1139, the founding of Lübeck in 1143 and the call by Count Adolf II of Schauenburg to settle in Eastern Holstein, and Pomerania in the same year.

Weakened by ongoing internal conflicts and constant warfare, the independent Wendish territories finally lost the capacity to provide effective military resistance. From 1119 to 1123, Pomerania invaded and subdued the northeastern parts of the Lutici lands. According to Kantzow, in 1124 and 1128, Wartislaw I, Duke of Pomerania, at that time a vassal of Poland, invited bishop Otto of Bamberg to Christianize the Pomeranians and Liutizians of his duchy. In 1147, as a campaign of the Northern Crusades, the Wendish Crusade was mounted in the Duchy of Saxony to retake the marches lost in 983. The crusaders also headed for Pomeranian Demmin and Szczecin, despite these areas having already been successfully Christianized. The Crusade caused widespread devastation and slaughter.

=== Settlement ===
This created ideal conditions for German settlement; some of the most prominent supporters of settlement included William IV who had purchased small amounts of land on the frontier of Pomerania, and Wichmann von Seeburg. In 1152, large numbers of Flemish and Dutch people were introduced to the unoccupied and uncultivated marshlands just east of Magdeburg near the Havel. They founded the cities of Fläming and Jüterbog. Henry the Lion also settled Mecklenburg with a large number of Flemish people. The formation of the Hanseatic League, which allowed further German settlement in coastal towns due to it being the dominant trade republic in the Baltic and North seas.

After the Wendish crusade, Albert the Bear was able to establish and expand the Margraviate of Brandenburg in 1157 on approximately the territory of the former Northern March, which since 983 had been controlled by the Hevelli and Lutici tribes. The Bishopric of Havelberg, that had been occupied by revolting Lutici tribes, was reestablished to Christianize the Wends.

In 1164, after Saxon duke Henry the Lion finally defeated rebellious Obotrites and Pomeranian dukes in the Battle of Verchen, the Pomeranian duchies of Demmin and Stettin became Saxon fiefs, as well as the Obodrite territories, which became Mecklenburg, named after the Obotrites' residential capital, Mecklenburg Castle. After Henry the Lion lost his internal struggle with Emperor Frederick I, Mecklenburg and Pomerania became fiefs of the Holy Roman Empire in 1181, although the latter briefly as it passed under Danish suzerainty in 1185, and then under Imperial again only in the 13th century.

== Bohemia ==
=== Background ===
German influence in Bohemia began when Duke Spytihněv I freed himself from Moravian vassalage and instead paid homage to the East Frankish King Arnulf of Carinthia at the Imperial Diet (Reichstag) in Regensburg in 895. In 973, when the Bishopric of Prague was created, it was made subject to the Archbishopric of Mainz, which increased German influence. In the 11th century, Bretislav I led a campaign against Poland, reconquering Silesia and transferring the relics of Saint Adalbert to Prague, hoping to have Prague elevated to archbishopric status. This resulted in a military conflict with the German King Henry III, and in the end, Bretislav had to renounce his conquests in Poland and recognize Henry as his sovereign. On the epoch of the war of investiture in Germany, Henry IV decisively fixed German-Bohemian relations by playing off the Polish-Bohemian enmity. In 1080, Vratislav II, fighting under the banner of the Emperor, captured the golden lance of the papal counter-king, Rudolf of Swabia, at the battle of Flarchheim. Bohemia's reward for this loyalty came six years later, in 1086, when Henry IV elevated the Duke to the rank of king.

=== Settlement ===
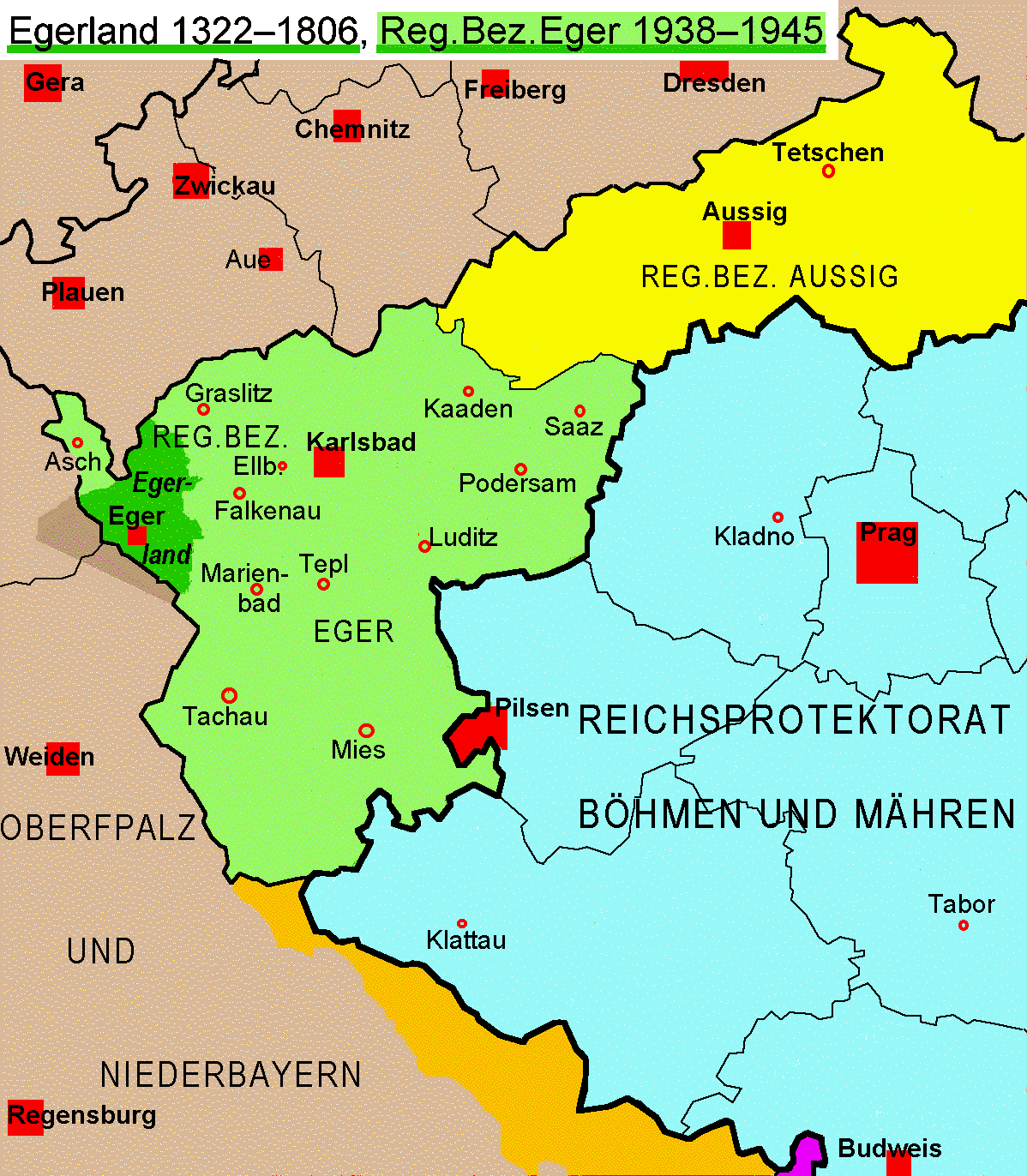
Egerland, which was settled by Germans during the Ostsiedlung and remained predominately German until 1945

All of this laid the perfect conditions for German settlement and dominance of Bohemia. German settlers, mainly traders, miners, farmers and monks settled the country. The trade fairs of Prague attracted many merchants from all over Europe, with many including the Germans settling in Prague, and even making up almost a quarter of all people in Prague. Bretislav II granted them important privileges, notably the right of self-government under magistrates of their own election, and the right of living under German law. During the late 12th and early 13th century, German settlement of the mountainous borderland (known as the Sudetenland) began, caused by the successful settlement of modern-day Northeastern Germany. The mountainous Eger Valley was settled first, partially due to its southern edges coming under the control of Diepold III who was an ally of Holy Roman Emperor Frederick Barbarossa. Furthermore, the Monastery of Waldsassen owned extensive land in the Eger Valley.

The first German villages were Penerit and Neudorf, both founded in 1196. Bavarians and Austrians settled the southern edge, East Franks the middle edge, and Saxon miners the northern edge, notably the Erzgebirge. Unlike in Mecklenburg, Pomerania, Brandenburg, and Silesia, the German settlement was not as great, nor were many Czechs assimilated like Eastern Germany. As German influence grew, with greater numbers of Settlers arriving each year, Soběslav II felt it was necessary to protect the Czechs from Germany, asking Henry II, Duke of Austria to renounce his claims to certain Bohemian lands; this was refused, and in the war that followed he was defeated.

This laid the conditions for a period of political unrest under Soběslav's successors Frederick and Conrad II. This allowed for greater settlement during the 13th century, where numerous Czech towns received so many German settlers they were practically Germanized and became majority German. Resulting from the German influence on the nobility, many castle and village names were Germanized, such as Zvíkov Castle to Burg Klingenberg. Under the reign of Vladislaus II, various military orders, the most prominent of which, the Knights Hospitaller, were even allowed to bring German settlers into Bohemian lands and settle them.

During this time, German settlers were exempt from the local Župan Laws, which included various duties such as the upkeep of local infrastructure. In 1219, Litoměřice (German: Leitmeritz), was the first German town to be given the privileges of the Magdeburg Laws in Bohemia. During the 13th–14th century, as many as 1 out of every 6th German settlers went to Bohemia; while this is lower than in Upper Saxony, Lusatia, and Lower Silesia, it's still a substantial number.

=== End ===
German settlement slowed during the late 14th and early 15th centuries due to various factors, including the Black Plague in Germany and the Hussite Wars. Consequently, Bohemia was never fully Germanized and Czech culture survived, eventually flourishing during the Czech National Revival. In the 20th century, following the occupation of Czechoslovakia and the establishment of the Protectorate of Bohemia and Moravia (with the Sudetenland having already been annexed), Nazi Germany attempted to Germanize the Czech population as part of the Final Solution of the Czech Question. This process was reversed after the Nazi defeat in World War II. The subsequent Beneš decrees ensured that Germans were expelled from Czech lands, including the Sudetenland. As such, the Ostsiedlung in Bohemia was ultimately reversed after 1945.

== Prussia and the Baltics ==
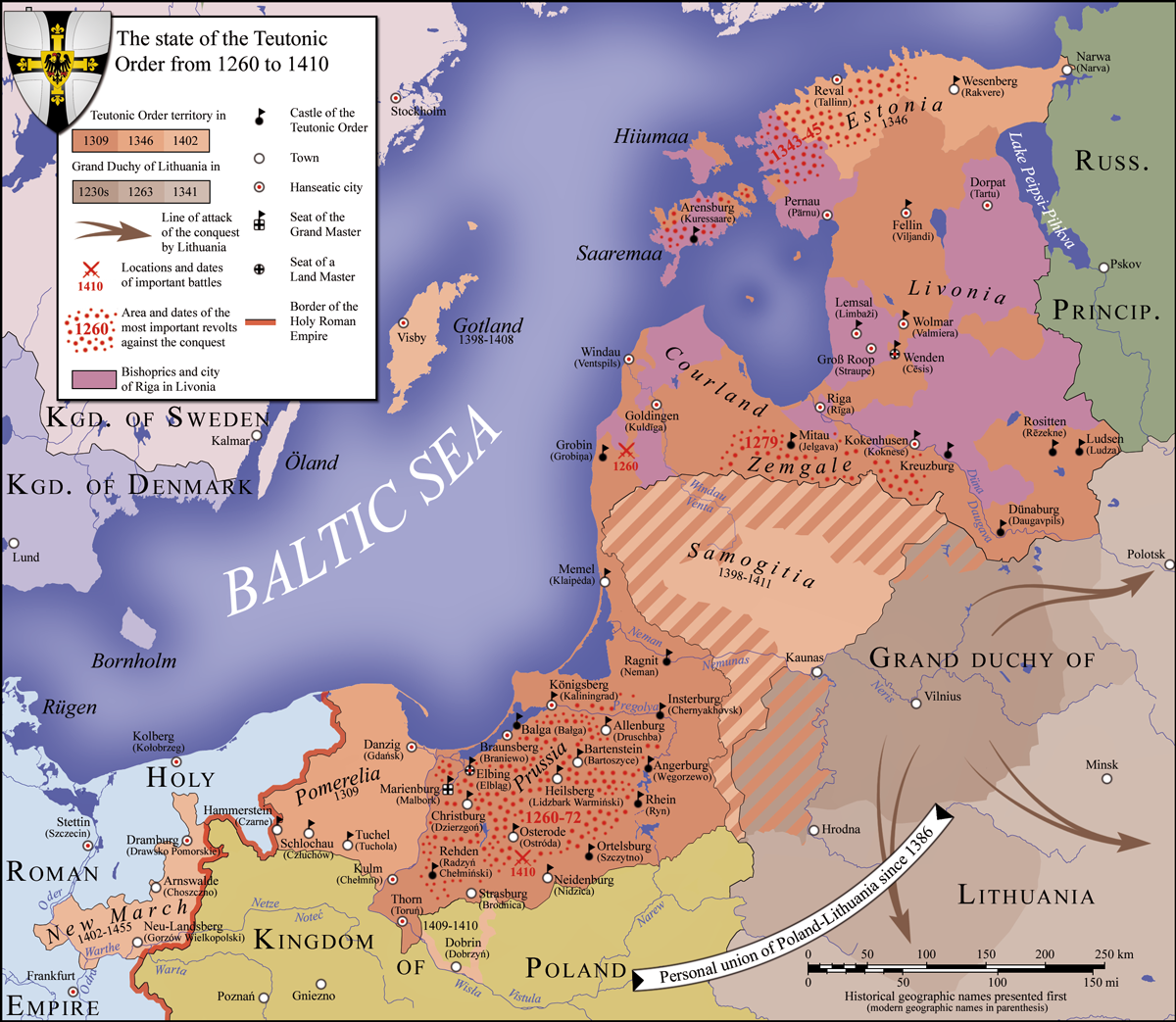
Lands of the Teutonic Order in 1410

The Teutonic State was formed in the aftermath of the Livonian Crusade, Prussian Crusade and in general the Northern Crusades in the territories of Prussia, Pomerelia and Livonia. It was established on February 2, 1207 as a principality of the Holy Roman Empire and proclaimed by Pope Innocent III in 1215 as a subject to the Holy See.

The Teutonic State established a comprehensive administrative structure, and modernized the old traditional tribal structure of the region. An integral part of the Order other than converting Pagans to Christianity was also to encourage Germans to settle the sparsely populated area. Most German settlers primarily went to urban cities, such as Graudenz (Grudziądz), Elbing (Elbląg), and Riga. The settlers also established numerous rural settlements, known as Vorwerke in German. Most of the settlers came from the Rhineland region. The Teutonic Order established numerous castles and other holdings near populated places such as Königsberg to consolidate the conquered lands. While East Prussia was heavily settled and Germanized, Livonia still had a very small German population, because there were no attempts to settle inland. The Germans in Livonia were mainly employees of the Teutonic Order there for administrative purposes, or merchants of the Hanseatic League who settled coastal towns.

== Transylvania ==
While Hungary was never conquered by the Holy Roman Empire and was never in focus of German settlement, it still had a sizable German population. During the 11th century, Stephen I of Hungary invited German priests, abbots, and churchmen to found monasteries and promote the conversion of Hungary. Eventually these Germans' descendants started to fill other occupations, becoming merchants, clerks, and farmers, etc. and were granted the status of free peasants. In 1149, Géza II invited German settlers to Southern Transylvania. Written records call them "Flamands", "Teutons", and "Latins". The term "Saxons" appeared in 1206, and became the official term for local Germans in 1231. The term represented legal status rather than nationality. The Transylvanian Saxons have diverse origins, their pottery, art, and liturgy were not uniform. In the 12th and 13th centuries, more Germans arrived in Hungary, living in dispersed villages known as Königsboden. By the mid-13th century, their importance in trade (especially in Pozsony, Pest and Nagyszombat) and gold and silver mining (especially in Beszterce and Radna) grew significant.

When Stephen I married Gisela of Bavaria, many German knights came to Hungary, joining its military. They were often rewarded with large estates and entry into the nobility. In 1224, Andrew II signed a charter laying out the duties and rights of the Germans in the kingdom. The king defined their duties such as the payment of tax, military service, and housing of the king and his officials. In exchange, they were able to elect their priests and officials independently and their merchants were exempt from customs duties. Their markets were also not taxed. No outsider was allowed to receive villages or estates in German land where only the monarch and the Count of Hermannstadt had jurisdiction.

== Social and demographic background ==
Political and military events were greatly influenced by a massive population increase throughout Europe in the High Middle Ages. From the 11th to the 13th centuries, the population in the kingdom of Germany increased from about four to twelve million inhabitants. During this time, the High Medieval Landesausbau (inland settlement) took place, when arable land was largely expanded at the expense of forested areas. Although new land was won and numerous settlements created, demands could not be absorbed. Another factor was a surplus of offspring of the nobility who were not entitled to inheritance, but after the success of the first crusade, took their chances of acquiring new lands in the peripheral regions of the Empire.

There is no doubt that there were "rather numerous German settlers" in Eastern Central Europe who were responsible for bringing German law in the earliest stages of the colonization. Other settlers included Walloons, Jews, Dutch, Flemish, and later Poles, especially in the territory of modern Ukraine.

The Walsers migrated from the territory of present-day Switzerland to areas that had formerly been inhabited by Romans. The Walser settlers left their homes in Valais and founded villages in the uplands of the Alp valleys (in the north of Italy and in the Grisons).

== Technical and agricultural development ==
The Medieval Warm Period, which began in the 11th century resulted in higher average temperatures in Central Europe. Additional technical progress in agriculture, for example through the construction of mills, Three-field farming and increased cultivation of grain (graining) led to general population increase.

The new settlers not only brought their customs and language with them, but also new technical skills and equipment that were adapted within a few decades, especially in agriculture and crafts. These included:

The amount of cultivated land increased as large forested areas were cleared. The extent of land increase differed by region. In Silesia, it had doubled (16% of the total area) by the beginning of the 11th century, 30% in the 16th century and the highest increase rates in the 14th century, the total area of arable land increased seven – to twentyfold in many Silesian regions during the Ostsiedlung.

Parallel to agricultural innovations new forms of farm layout and settlement structuring (division and classification of land) were introduced. Farmland was divided into Hufen, (English hides) and larger villages replaced the previously dominant type of small villages consisting of four to eight farms as a complete transformation of the previous settlement structure occurred. The cultural landscape of East Central Europe formed by the medieval settlement processes essentially prevails until today.

=== Dutch settlers and hydraulic engineering ===
Flemish and Dutch settlers were among the first to immigrate to Mecklenburg at the beginning of the 12th century. In the following years, they moved further east to Pomerania and Silesia and in the south to Hungary, motivated by the lack of settlement areas in their already largely developed home areas and several flood disasters and famines.

Experienced and skilled hydraulic engineers, they were in high demand at the settlements of the as yet undeveloped areas east of the Elbe. The land was drained by creating a network-like structure of smaller drainage ditches that drained the water in main ditches. Roads connecting the settlers' individual farms ran along these main trenches.

Dutch settlers were recruited by the local rulers in large numbers, especially during the second half of the 12th century. In 1159/60, for example, Albert the Bear granted Dutch settlers the right to take possession of former Slavic settlements. The preacher Helmold of Bosau reported on this in his Slavic chronicle: "Finally, when the Slavs were gradually dispersing, he (Albrecht) sent to Utrecht and the Rhine region, and also to those who live by the ocean, who under the power of the sea had suffered, the Dutch, Zealanders and Flemings, where he attracted a lot of people and let them live in the castles and villages of the Slavs."

=== Agricultural implements ===
Three-field system with ridge and furrow fields (furlongs)

The Slavs used ploughs and agricultural implements before the arrival of German settlers. The oldest meaningful reference to this can be found in a Slavic chronicle, in which the use of a plough as an areal measurement is mentioned. Nevertheless, heavier and more capable ploughs were brought by the settlers. (Note: "The Slavonic peoples of Central and Eastern Europe were not ignorant of agriculture, as is sometimes maintained. The Germans, however, plainly understood the principles of cereal exploitation and they probably also introduced to the regions of settlement the 'heavy' plough or Pflug and the system of annual three-field rotation.")

In 12th and 13th century documents, the Ard without a mouldboard is mentioned. Ard tear the soil open, spreading it to both sides without turning it and are therefore particularly suitable for light and sandy subsoil. In the mid-13th century, the three-field system was introduced east of the Elbe. This new cultivation method required the use of the heavy mouldboard plough that digs up the earth deeply and turns it around in a single operation. (Note: "The Slavonic peoples of Central and Eastern Europe were not ignorant of agriculture, as is sometimes maintained. The Germans, however, plainly understood the principles of cereal exploitation and they probably also introduced to the regions of settlement the 'heavy' plough or Pflug and the system of annual three-field rotation.")

The different modes of operation of the two devices also had an impact on the shape and size of the cultivation areas. The fields worked with the ard had about the same field length and width and a square base. Long fields with a rectangular base were much more suitable for the mouldboard plough, as the heavy implements had to be turned less often. Planting and cultivation of oats and rye was promoted, and soon these cereals became the most important type of grain. Farmers who used mouldboard ploughs were required to pay double tax fees.

=== Pottery ===
Potters were among the first group of artisans who also settled in the rural areas. Typical Slavic ceramics were flat-bottom vessels. With the influx of western settlers, new vessel shapes such as rounded jars were introduced, including hard-fired processes which improved ceramic quality. This type of ceramics, known as Hard Grayware, became widespread east of the Elbe by the end of the 12th century. It was manufactured extensively in Pomerania by the 13th century, when more advanced manufacturing methods, such as the tunnel kiln, enabled the mass production of ceramic household goods. The demand for household goods such as pots, jugs and bowls - which had previously been made of wood - increased steadily and promoted the development of new markets.

During the 13th century, glazed ceramics were introduced and the import of stoneware increased. The transfer of technology and knowledge affected the way of life of old and new settlers in a variety of ways and, in addition to innovations in agriculture and handicrafts, also included other areas, such as weapons technology, documents and coins.

=== Architecture ===
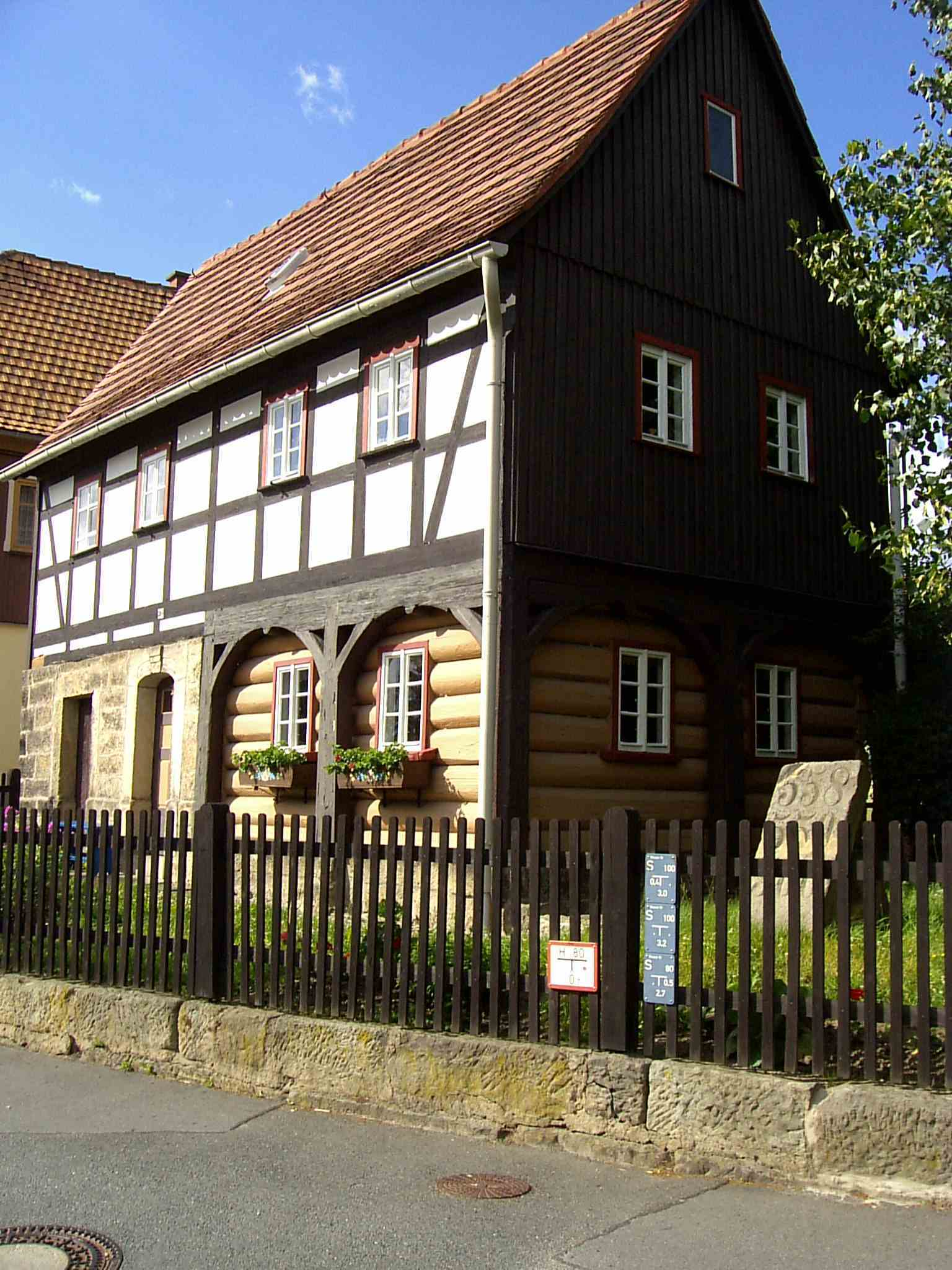
Timber-framed house in Schöna

The Slavic population (Sorbs), who lived east of the Elbe, primarily built log houses, which had proven suitable for the regional climates and wood was plentiful in the continental regions. The German settlers, mainly from Franconia and Thuringia, who advanced into the area in the 13th century, brought with them the half-timbering style, which was already known to the Germanic peoples, as a wood-saving, solid and stable construction method that allowed multistory buildings. A combination of the two construction methods was difficult because the horizontally stacked wood of the log room expands differently in height than the vertical posts of the framework. The result was the new type of half-timbered house with a timber frame around the ground floor block, capable to support a second floor, which was made of half-timber (Upper Lusatian house). Today the so-called "Umgebindeland" includes the Upper Lusation houses in the region of Lower Silesia and Lusatia.

== Population and settlement ==
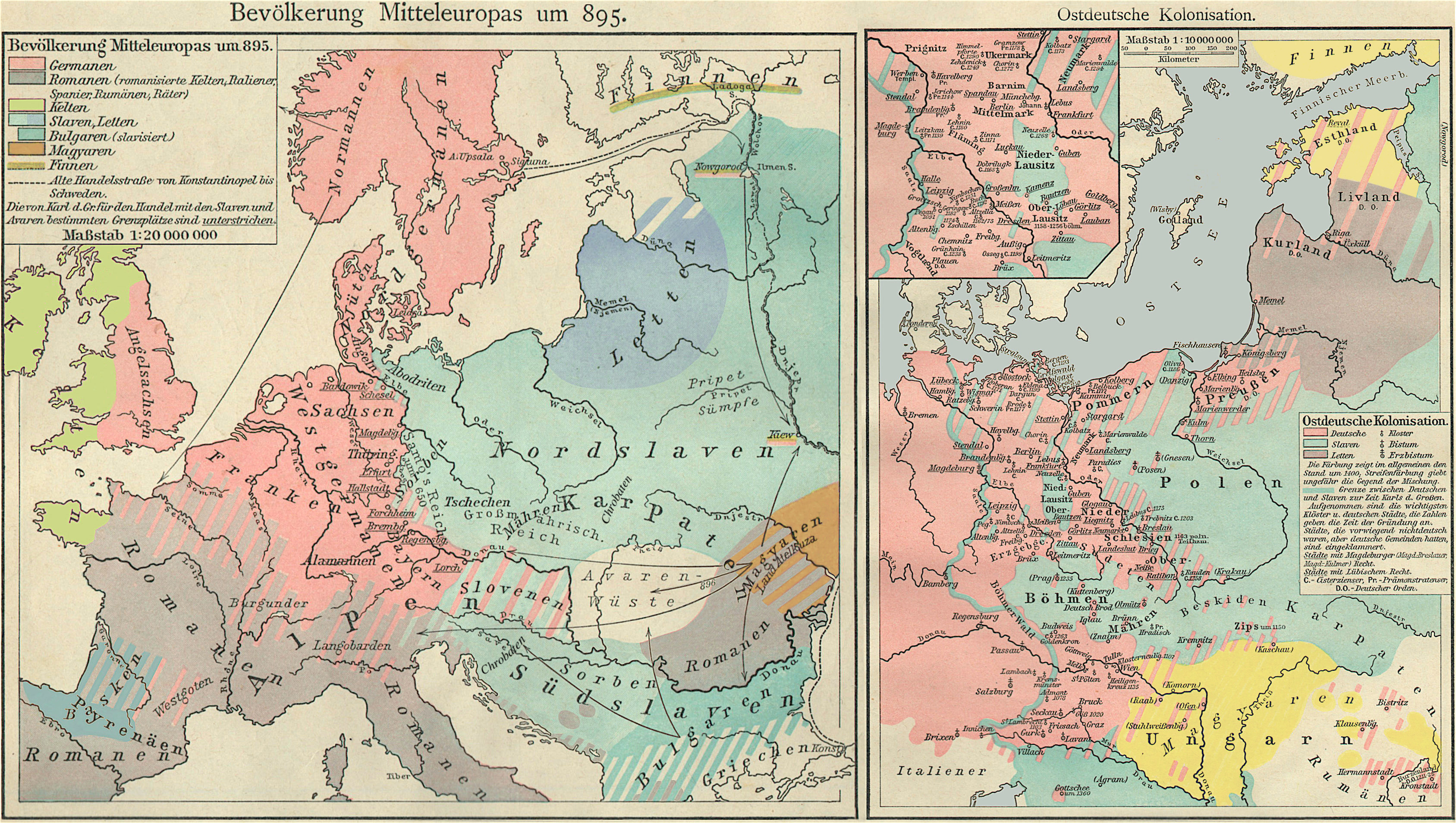
German eastward expansion 895–1400

The Ostsiedlung followed an immediate rapid population growth throughout Central and Eastern Europe. During the 12th and 13th centuries, the population density increased considerably. The increase was due to the influx of settlers on the one hand and an increase in Slavic populations after the settlement on the other hand. Settlement was the primary reason for the increase e.g. in the areas east of the Oder, the Duchy of Pomerania, western Greater Poland, Silesia, Austria, Moravia, Prussia and Transylvania, while in the larger part of Central and Eastern Europe indigenous populations were responsible for the growth. Author Piskorski wrote that "insofar as it is possible to draw conclusions from the less than rich medieval source material, it appears that at least in some East Central European territories the population increased significantly. It is however possible to contest to what extent this was a direct result of migration and how far it was due to increased agricultural productivity and the gathering pace of urbanization." In contrast to Western Europe, this increased population was largely spared by the 14th-century Black Death pandemic.

With the German settlers new systems of taxation arrived. While the existing Wendish tithe was a fixed tax depending on village size, the German tithe depended on the actual crop yield. Thus higher taxes were collected from the settlers than from the Wends, although settlers were partly exempted from tax payments during the first years after settlement establishment.

=== Urban development and city foundations ===
Examples of Ostsiedlung towns

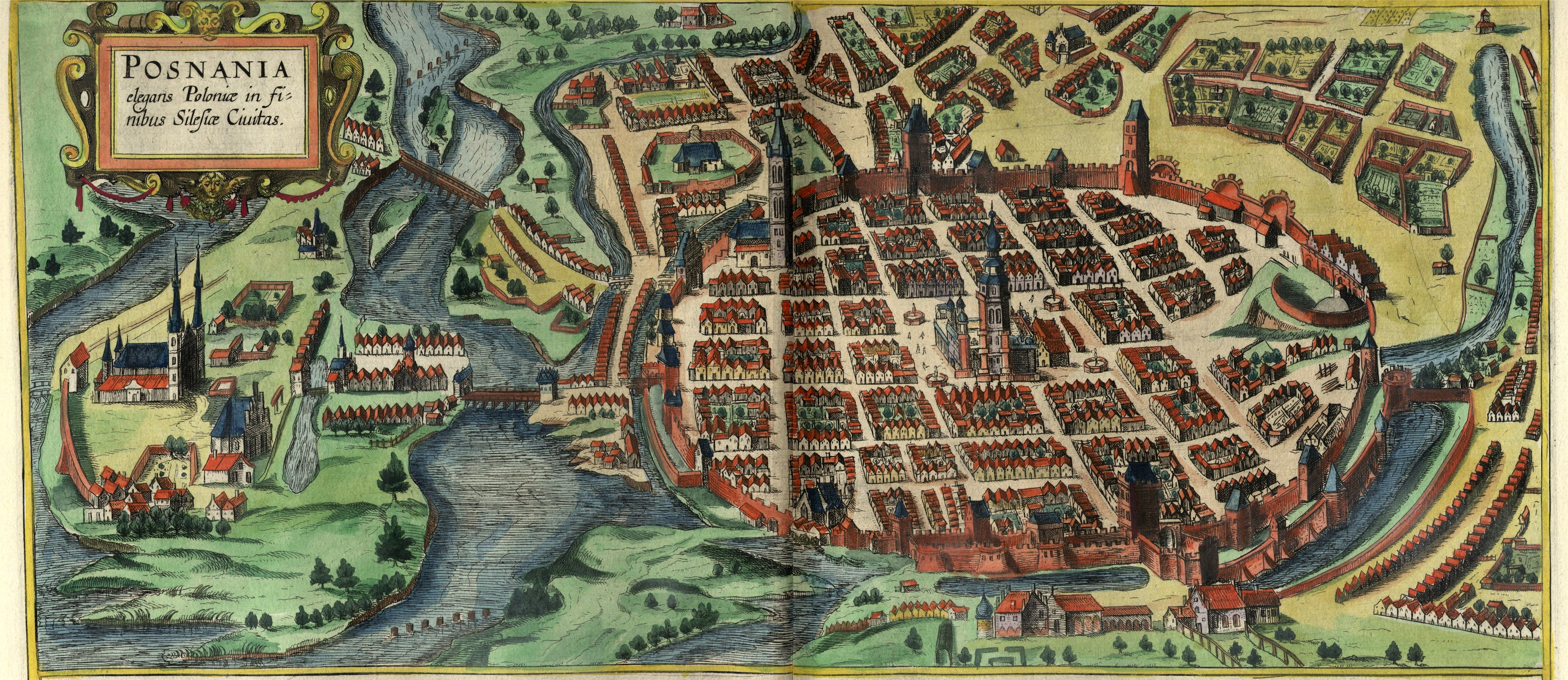
Poznań (German: Posen), an example of an Ostsiedlung town attached to a preexisting castrum (castle with a suburbium). The castrum was located on the island with the cathedral, the Ostsiedlung town with its rectangular street grid was built on the river's bank. The Germans and Poles lived separately in the same city.

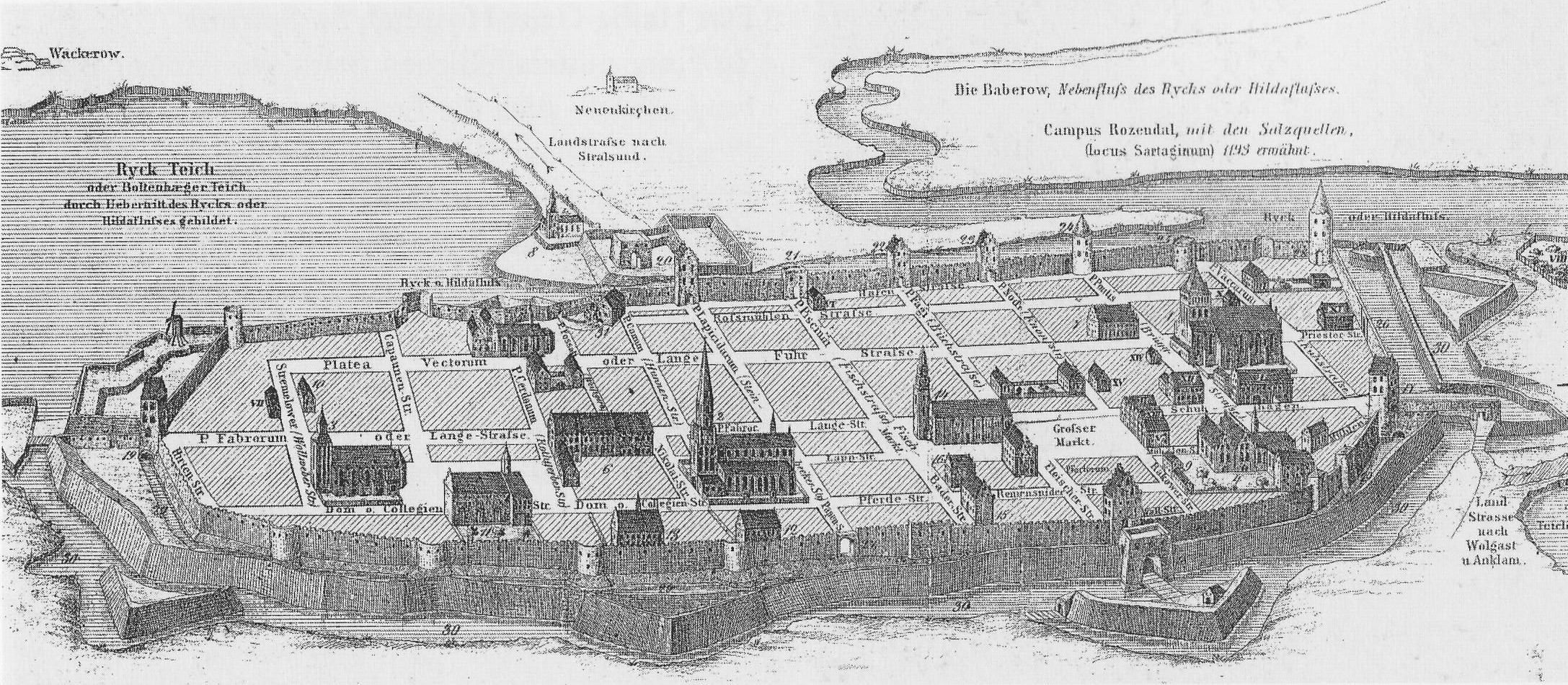
Greifswald in medieval Pomerania is an example of an Ostsiedlung town built in a previously unsettled area. Locators organized the settlement and set up rectangular blocks in an oval area with a central market.

The development of Germania Slavica was also associated with the establishment of towns. There already existed Slavic castle towns, in which merchant quarters formed suburbs at fortified strongholds (grads). Wendish-Scandinavian merchants founded manufacturing and trading settlements (emporia) at the Baltic coast. Large cities included Szczecin (Stettin) which reached 9,000 inhabitants, Kraków and Wrocław (Breslau), major cities and centers of power of medieval Poland. However, they experienced substantial growth since the end of the 12th century through new settlers and expansion (locatio civitatis). The foundation of a bishopric, for example in Havelberg, would lead to the development of a town, although cities were also founded out of nowhere, such as Neubrandenburg. Characteristic of the founding cities are geometrical or rasterized floor plans with main streets, intersecting axes and a central market place. Different settlement phases are reflected in twin cities names such as New town or Old town.

The towns established during the Ostsiedlung were Free Towns (civitates liberae) or called "New Towns" by contemporaries. The rapid increase in the number of towns led to an "urbanization of East Central Europe". The new towns differed from their predecessors in:

- The introduction of German town law, resulting in far-reaching administrative and judicial rights for the towns. The townspeople were personally free, enjoyed far-reaching property rights and were subject to the town's own jurisdiction only. The privileges granted to the towns were copied, sometimes with minor changes, from the legal charters of the (Lübeck Law in 33 towns at the southern coast of the Baltic Sea), the Magdeburg Law in Brandenburg, areas of modern Saxony, Lusatia, Silesia, northern Bohemia, northern Moravia and the Teutonic Order state, the Nuremberg Law in southwestern Bohemia, the Brünn Law (Brno) in Moravia, based on the charter of Vienna), the Iglau Law (Jihlava) in Bohemian and Moravian mining areas. Besides these basic town laws, several adapted town charters.
- The introduction of permanent markets. As previously, markets were held only periodically; townspeople were now free to trade and marketplaces became a central feature of the new towns.
- Layout: The new towns were planned towns as their layout was usually rectangular.

==== City laws and grants ====
The granting of city rights played an important role in attracting German settlers. Town charters privileged the new residents and existing suburban settlements with a market and were rebuilt or expanded. Even small settlements inhabited by native people would eventually be granted these new rights. Regardless of existing suburban settlements, locators were commissioned to establish completely new cities, as the goal was to attract as many people as possible in order to create new, flourishing population centers.

==== Expansion of the German city laws ====
Among the many different German city laws, the Magdeburg law and the Lübeck law played the greatest role in the new settlements as they served, often in more or less modified form, as models for most cities. Other city rights that were of regional importance include the Nuremberg law, the Mecklenburg law and the Iglau law. The Lübeck law of 1188 served in the 13th and 14th centuries as the model for around 100 cities in the entire Baltic Sea trading area. Around 350,000 people lived under Lübeck law in the early 15th century. The Magdeburg law, which has its origins in the privileges granted by Archbishop Wichmann of Magdeburg, first spread into Brandenburg, Saxony and Lusatia. Laws based on the Magdeburg model (for example the Kulm/Chełmno law and Neumarkt/Środa law) were introduced in Poland, including Silesia, the State of the Teutonic Order, Bohemia and Moravia and beyond.

=== Religious changes ===
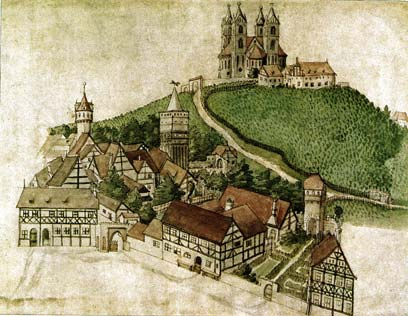
St. Mary of Brandenburg, built on top of the pagan Triglav sanctuary, by Zacharias Garcaeus, 1588

The pagan Wends had been the target of Christianization attempts before the beginning of the Ostsiedlung, since the government of emperor Otto I and the establishment of dioceses east of the Elbe. The Slav uprising of 983 put an end to these efforts for almost 200 years. In contrast to the Czechs and Poles, who had been Christianized before the turn of the millennium, the conversion attempts of the Elbe Slavs were initially accompanied by violence. The arrival of new settlers from around 1150 on led to a civil Christianization of the areas between the Elbe and Oder. The new settlers first built wooden and later field stone parish churches in their villages. Some places of worship, such as the St. Mary in Brandenburg, and the Lehnin Abbey, were built on pagan shrines. The Cistercians, who had been assigned a prominent role by church authorities, combined the spread of faith and settlement development. Their monasteries with extensive international connections played a vital role in the development of the communities.

=== Settlers ===
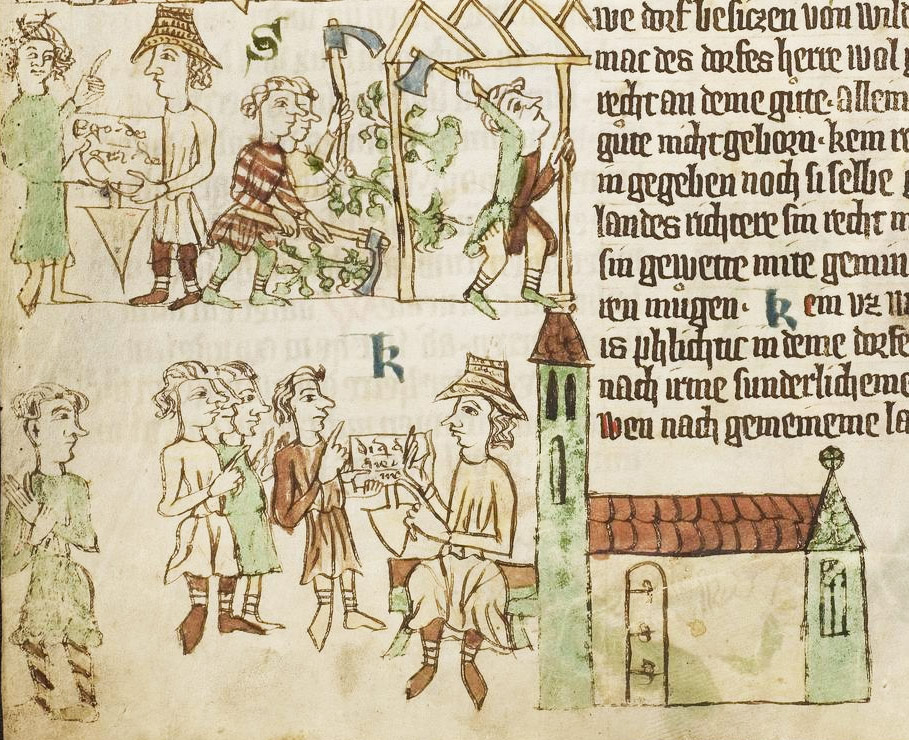
Sachsenspiegel depicting the Ostsiedlung. A Lokator receives the foundation charter from the landlord and acts as village judge. Settlers clear forests and build houses.

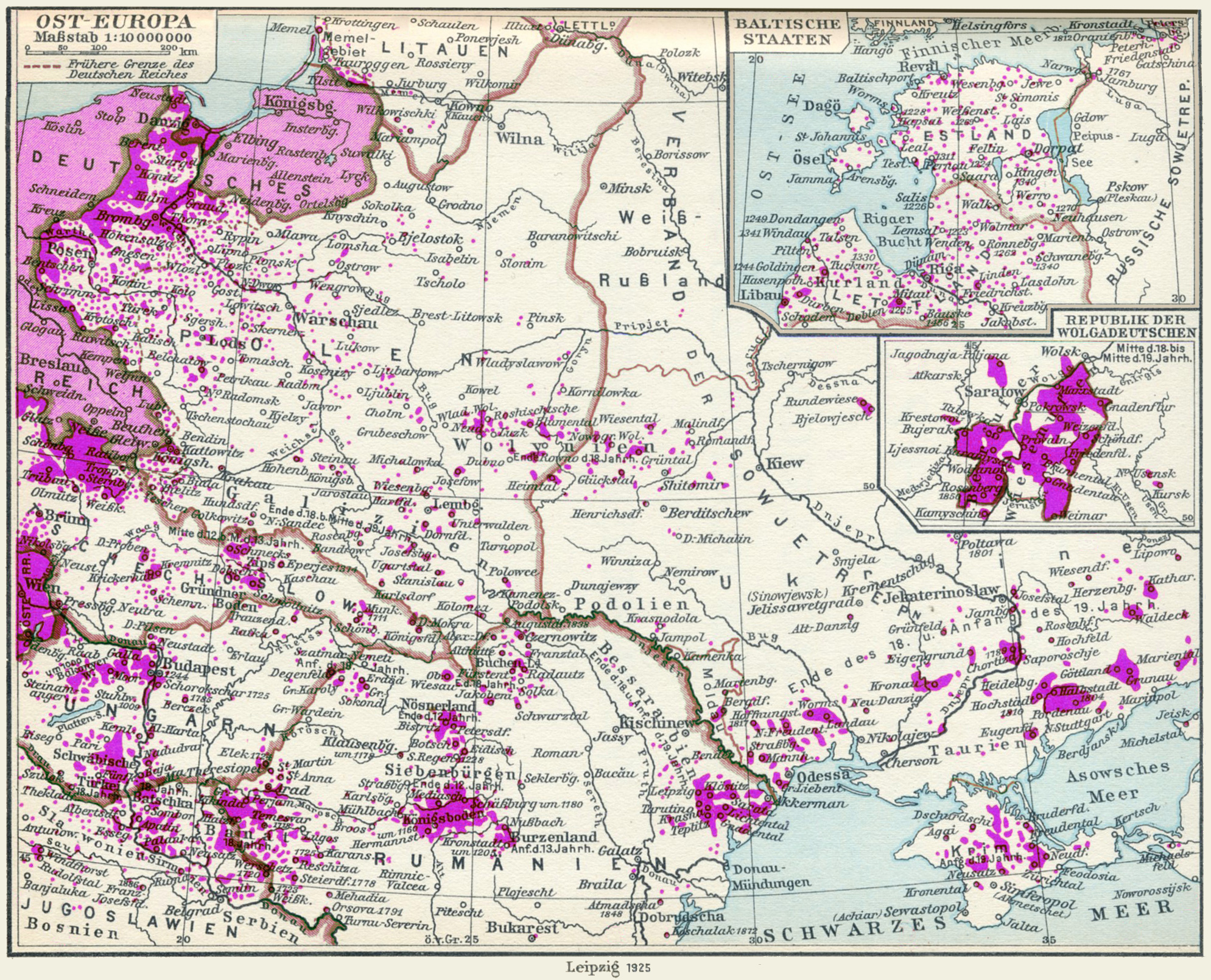
Ethnic Germans in Central/Eastern Europe, 1925

The majority of the settlers were Germans of the Holy Roman Empire. Significant numbers of Dutch settlers participated, particularly in the early 12th century in the area surrounding the Middle Elbe River. To a lesser extent Danes, Scots or local Wends and (French-speaking) Walloons participated as well. Among the settlers were landless children of noble families who could not inherit property.

Besides the marches, adjacent to the Empire, Germans settled in areas farther east, such as the Carpathians, Transylvania, and along the Gulf of Riga. Settlers were invited by local secular rulers, such as dukes, counts, margraves, princes and (only in a few cases due to the weakening central power) the king. The sovereigns in East Central Europe owned large territories, of which only small portions were arable, which generated very little income. The lords offered considerable privileges to new settlers from the Empire. Starting in the border marks, the princes invited people from the Empire by granting them land ownership and improved legal status, binding duties and the inheritance of the farm. The landowners eventually benefited from these rather generous conditions for the farmers, and generated income from the land that had previously been fallow.

Most sovereigns transferred the specific recruitment of settlers, the distribution of the land and the establishment of the settlements to so-called Lokators (allocator of land). These men, who usually came from the lower nobility or the urban bourgeoisie, organized the settlement trains, that included advertising, equipment and transport, land clearing and preparation of the settlements. Locator contracts settled rights and obligations of the locators and the new settlers.

Towns were founded and granted German town law. The agricultural, legal, administrative, and technical methods of the immigrants, as well as their successful Christianization of the native inhabitants, led to a gradual transformation of the settlement areas, as Slavic communities adopted German culture. German cultural and linguistic influence lasted in some of these areas right up to the present day.

In the mid 14th century, the migration process slowed considerably as a result of the Black Death. The population probably decreased by that time and economically marginal settlements were left, in particular at the coast of Pomerania and Western Prussia. Only a century later, local Slavic leaders of Pomerania, Western Prussia and Silesia invited German settlers again.

== Assimilation ==
Settlement was the pretext for assimilation processes that lasted centuries. Assimilation occurred in both directions – depending on the region and the majority population, Slavic and German settlers mutually assimilated each other.

=== Germans ===
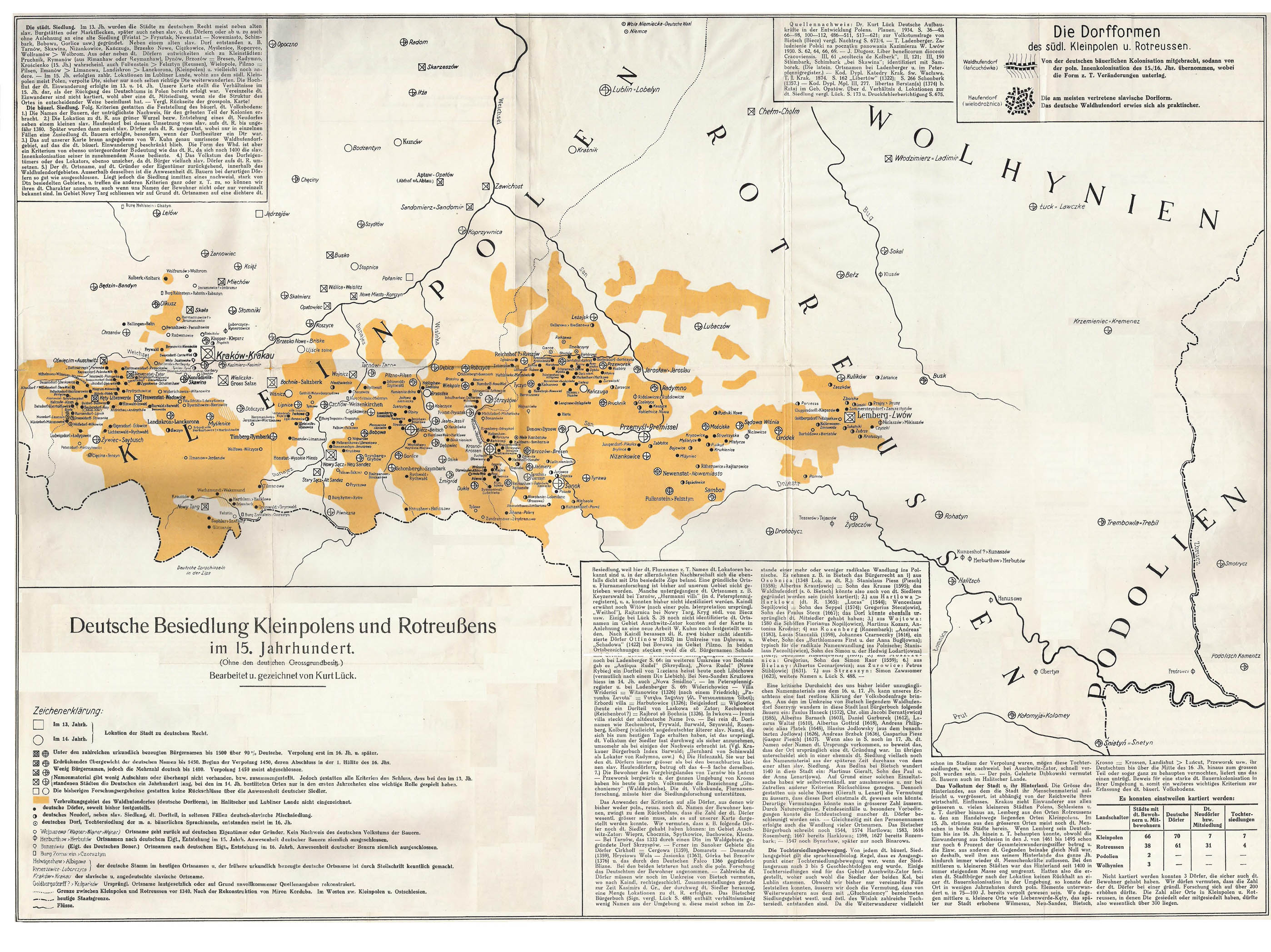
Subcarpathian (Małopolska) Germans in the 15th century

The Polonization process of German settlers in Kraków and Poznań lasted about two centuries. The community could only continue its isolated position with a continuation of newcomers from German lands. The Sorbs also assimilated German settlers, yet at the same time, small Sorbic communities were themselves assimilated by the surrounding German-speaking population. Many Central and Eastern European towns developed into multi-ethnic melting pots.

=== Treatment, involvement and traces of the Wends ===
Although Slavic population density was generally not very high compared to the Empire and had, as a result of the extensive warfare during the 10th to 12th centuries, even further declined, some settlement centers maintained their Wendish populations to varying degrees, resisting assimilation for a long time.

In the territories of Pomerania and Silesia, German migrants did not settle in the old Slavic/Polish villages and set up new ones on grounds allotted to them by the Slavic/Polish dukes and the monastic clergy. In the marches west of the Oder, the Wends were occasionally driven out and the villages rebuilt by settlers. The new villages would nevertheless keep their former Slavic names. In the case of the village Böbelin in Mecklenburg, the evicted Wendish inhabitants repeatedly invaded their former village, hindering a resettlement.

In the Sorbian March the situation was again different as the area and in particular Upper Lusatia is situated close to Bohemia, ruled by a Slavic dynasty, a loyal and powerful duchy of the Empire. In this environment, German feudal lords often cooperated with the Slavic inhabitants. Wiprecht of Groitzsch, a prominent figure during the early German migration period only acquired local power through the marriage to a Slavic noblewoman and the support of the Bohemian king. German-Slavic relations were generally good, while relations between Slavic-governed Bohemia and Slavic-governed Poland were marred by constant struggle.

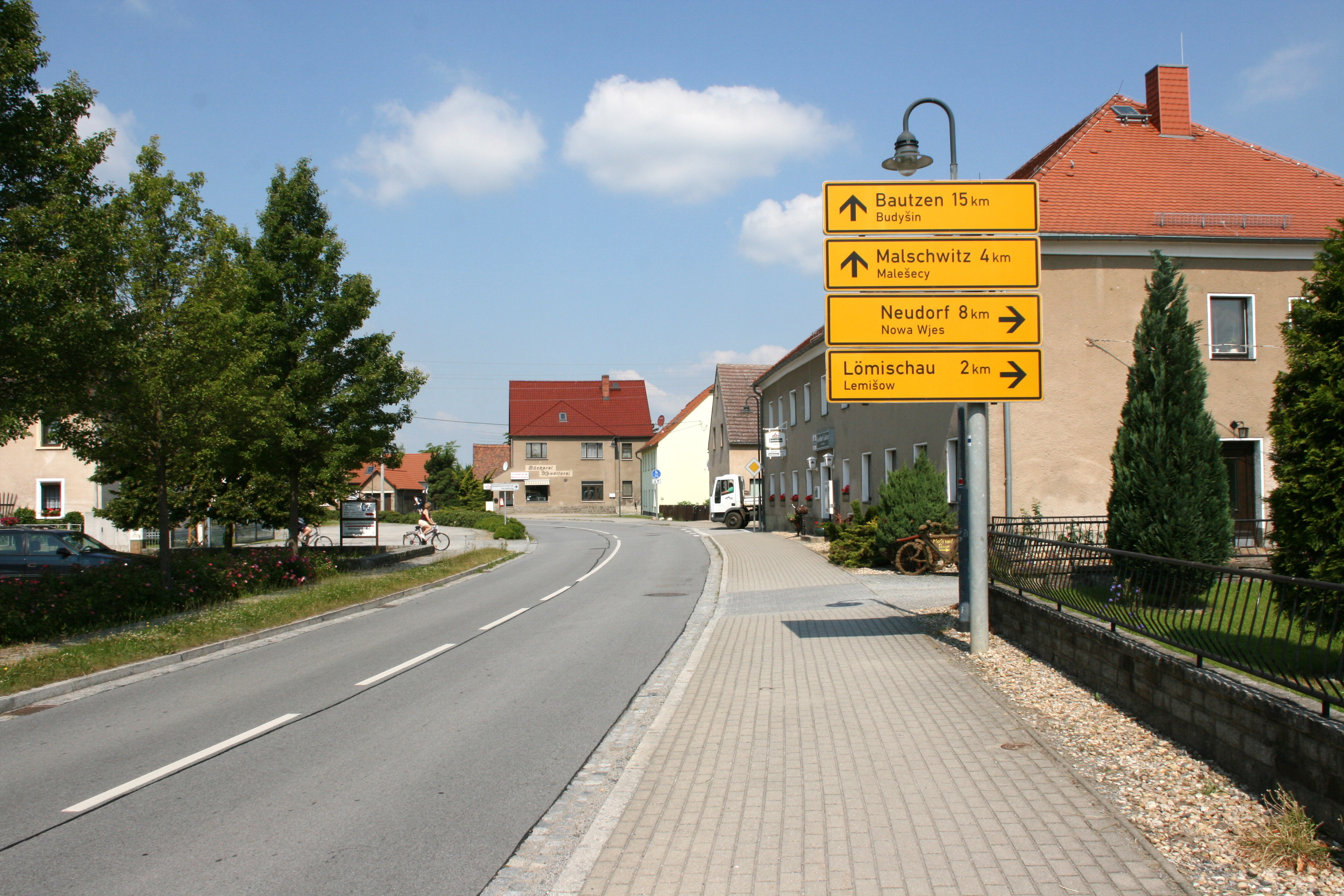
Bilingual German-Sorbian road signs in Saxony, Germany

Discrimination against the Wends was not a part of the general concept of the Ostsiedlung. Rather, the Wends were subject to a low taxation mode and thus not as profitable as new settlers. Even though the majority of the settlers were Germans (Franks and Bavarians in the South, and Saxons and Flemings in the North), Wends and other tribes also participated in the settlement. New settlers were not chosen just because of their ethnicity, a concept unknown in the Middle Ages, but because of their manpower and agricultural and technical know-how.

Most of the Wends were gradually assimilated. However, in isolated rural areas where Wends constituted a substantial part of the population, they continued their culture. These were the Drevani Polabians of the Wendland east of the Lüneburg Heath, the Jabelheide Drevani of southern Mecklenburg, the Slovincians and Kashubs of Eastern Pomerania, and the Sorbs of Lusatia. Lusatia was inhabited by a large population of Sorbs until the end of the 19th century as linguistic assimilation occurred in a relatively short time.

=== Language exchange ===
The Ostsiedlung caused the adoption of loan words, foreign words and loan translations among the German and the Slavic languages. Direct contact between Germans and Slavs caused direct language exchange of language elements due to the bilingualism of people or the spatial proximity of the speakers of the respective language. Remote contact took place during trade travels or political embassies.

The oldest adoption of naming units dates back to Proto-Germanic and Proto-Slavic. The original Slavic word *kъnędzъ can be found in almost all Slavic languages. German was mainly used to convey words in Slavic languages that related to handicraft, politics, agriculture and nutrition. This includes Old High German cihla, Middle High German ziegala, ziegel (brick), that resulted from the sound shift of the Latin tegula. An example of borrowing from Slavic into Germanic usage is the word for border. In Middle High German called Grenize, which is a borrowing of the old Czech word granicĕ or the Polish word granica. City names are also affected by language exchange, sound shifting and the Slavic second palatalization. The city of Regensburg is called Řezno in Czech and *Rezъno in Proto-Slavic. Due to the intensive language contact, idioms were also transmitted. Two examples from Czech and Polish are na vlastní pěst / na własną rękę ('on your own') or ozbrojený po zuby / uzbrojony po zęby ('armed to the teeth'), in Hungarian saját szakállára ('one's own beard') and állig felfegyverzett ('armed to the chin'), with different wording, but with the same meaning.

Category	English	German	Polish	Czech	Slovak	Hungarian
Administration	mayor	Bürgermeister	burmistrz	purkmistr	richtár (Note: from German Richter (lit. 'judge')) / burgmajster	polgármester
Administration	margrave	Markgraf	margrabia	markrabě	markgróf	őrgróf
Craft	brick	Ziegel	cegła	cihla	tehla	tégla
Food	pretzel	Brezel	precel	preclík	praclík	perec
Food	oil	Öl	olej	olej	olej	olaj
Agriculture	mill	Mühle	młyn	mlýn	mlyn	malom (mahlen)
Trade	(cart-)load	Fuhre	fura	fůra	fúra	furik
Music	flute	Flöte	flet	flétna	flauta	flóta

=== Names of localities and settlements ===
As Slavic and Wendish locality names were widely adopted, they represent, in adapted and further developed form, a very high proportion of East German toponyms and place names. These are recognizable at word endings, such as -ow (Germanized -au, as in Spandau), -vitz or -witz and sometimes -in. Newly created villages were given German names that ended, for example, with -dorf or -hagen in the North, and -rode or -hain in the South. The name of the settler's place of origin (example: Lichtervelde in Flanders) could also become part of the place name. If a German settlement was founded alongside a Wendish settlement, the name of the Wendendorf could also be adopted for the German village, the distinction was then made through additions (for example: Klein- or Wendisch- / Windisch- for Wendendorf, Groß- or Deutsch- for German).

In German-speaking areas most inherited surnames were formed only after the Ostsiedlung period, and many German surnames are in fact Germanized Wendish placenames.

The former ethnic variety of German (Deutsch-) and Slavic (Wendisch-, Böhmisch-, Polnisch-) toponyms was discontinued by the Eastern European republics after World War II. Villages and towns were renamed in Slavic only. Memory of the history of German settlement was no longer appreciated.

=== Family Names ===
It's estimated that approximately 25% of all German family names are of Slavic origin, most of these are Polish.

For most to least common
Name	Origin and meaning
Nowak	Slavic, now-/nov- 'new' (German: Neu) + -ak means "New settlers" (German: Neuansiedler
Noack	Sorbian, nowy 'new' (German: Neu) + -ak means "New settlers" (German: Neuansiedler)
Kretschmer	Czech, krčmář means "Publican"
Mielke	Slavic, nickname with mil- "love, dear" (German: Lieb, Teuer) + -ek
Stenzel	Polish nickname Stanisław
Kaminski	Polish, settlement name- kamień "Stone" (German: Stein) + -ski
Wieczorek	Polish, wieczor "evening" (German: Abend) + -ek
Kowalski	Polish, settlement name or kowal "Blacksmith" (German: Schmied) + -ski
Grabowski	Polish, settlement name + -ski
Jankowski	Polish, settlement or the nickname Janek + -ow + -ski

== End of migration ==
There is no clear cause nor a definite end point in time of the Ostsiedlung. However, a slowdown in the settlement movement can be observed after the year 1300 and in the 14th century only a few new settlements with the participation of German-speaking settlers were founded. An explanation for the end of the Ostsiedlung must include various factors without being able to clearly weigh or differentiate between them. The deterioration of the climate from around 1300 as the beginning of the "Little Ice Age", the agricultural crisis that began in the mid 14th century. In the wake of the demographic slump caused by the 1347 Plague, profound devastation processes have taken place. If a clear connection could be established here, the end of the Ostsiedlung would be understood as part of the crisis of the 14th century.

== Use in 20th century nationalism ==
In the 19th century, the recognition of Germanization of Slavic and eastern lands coincided with the rise of nationalism. In Germany and some Slavic countries (most notably Poland), the Ostsiedlung was perceived in nationalist circles as a prelude to contemporary expansionism and Germanization efforts, the slogan used for this perception was Drang nach Osten (Drive or Push to the East).

== Legacy ==
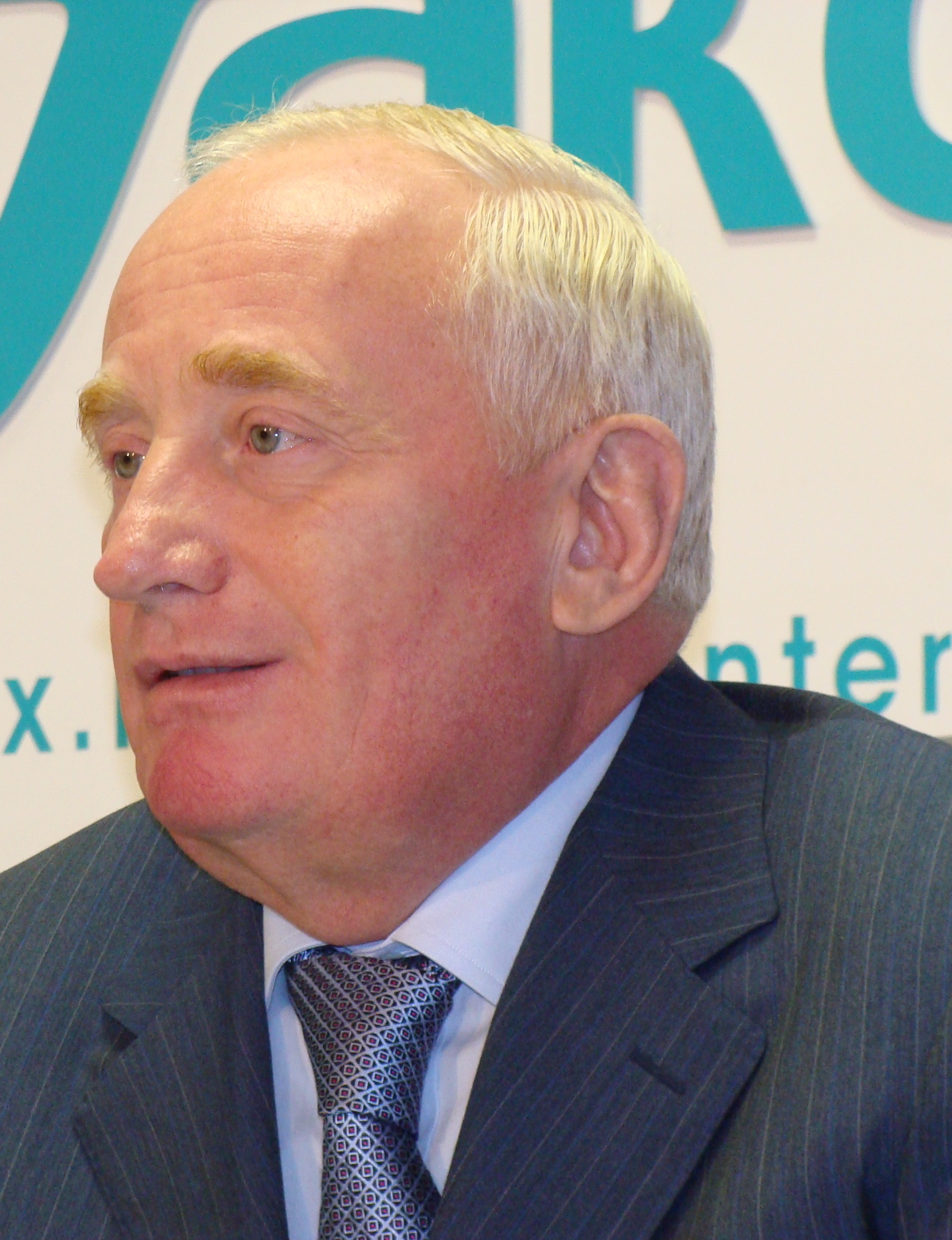
Viktor Kress, former governor of the Tomsk Oblast, Russia, is an ethnic German

The 20th century wars and nationalist policies severely altered the ethnic and cultural composition of Central and Eastern Europe. After World War I, Germans in reconstituted Poland were set under pressure to leave the Polish Corridor, the eastern part of Upper Silesia and Poznań. During World War II, the Nazis initiated the Nazi-Soviet population transfers, wiping out the old settlement areas of the Baltic Germans, the Germans in Bessarabia and others, to resettle them in the future territories in occupied Poland.

During World War II, the Generalplan Ost was launched with the aim of exterminating or enslaving Poles and other Slavs, according to the Nazis' Lebensraum concept. In order to press the territorial claims of Germany and to demonstrate supposed German superiority over non-Germanic peoples, the latter's cultural, urban and scientific achievements in that era were undermined, rejected, or presented as German. While further realization of this mega plan, aiming at a total reconstitution of Central and Eastern Europe as a German colony, was prevented by the war's turn, the beginning of the expulsion of 2 million Poles and settlement of Volksdeutsche in the annexed territories yet was implied by 1944.

The Potsdam Conference – the meeting between the leaders of the United States, Great Britain, and the Soviet Union – sanctioned the expulsion of Germans from Czechoslovakia, Poland and Hungary. With the Red Army's advance and Nazi Germany's defeat in 1945, the ethnic make-up of Central and Eastern and East Central Europe was radically changed, as nearly all Germans were expelled not only from all Soviet conquered German settlement areas across Central and Eastern Europe, but also from former territories of the Reich east of the Oder-Neisse line, especially the provinces of Silesia, East Prussia, East Brandenburg, and Pomerania. The Soviet-established People's Republic of Poland annexed the majority of the lands, while the northern half of East Prussia was taken by the Soviets, becoming the Kaliningrad Oblast, an exclave of the Russian SFSR. The former German settlement areas were resettled by ethnic citizens of the respective succeeding state (Czechs in the former Sudetenland and Poles in Silesia and Pomerania). However, some areas that were settled and Germanized in the course of the Ostsiedlung still form the northeastern part of modern Germany, such as the Bundesländer of Mecklenburg-Vorpommern, Brandenburg, Saxony and east of the limes Saxoniae in Holstein (part of Schleswig-Holstein).

The areas that were settled in the Middle Ages and later came to constitute the Eastern provinces of the German Empire and Austria were inhabited by an estimated 30 million Germans at beginning of 20th century. The westward withdrawal of political boundaries of Germany, first in 1919, but substantially in 1945, was followed by the removal of some 15 million people to resettle within borders of present-day Germany. Only the areas that were settled as far back as the 12th (and partially 13th) century remained German in language and culture and stayed part of post-1945 Eastern Germany and Austria.

== See also ==
- Lebensraum
- Generalplan Ost
- Cultural assimilation
- German diaspora
- Zipser Willkür
- Transylvanian Saxon University
- Drang nach Osten
- Limes Saxoniae
- Barbarian invasions
- Wends
- Wendish Crusade
- Northern Crusades
- Medieval demography
- German exonyms
- Germanization
- Germanization of Poles during Partitions
- History of Germans in Russia and the Soviet Union
- Historical migration
- Josephine colonization
- Population transfer in the Soviet Union
- Polonization
- Pre-modern human migration
- Heim ins Reich

== Bibliography ==
- Bartlett, Robert (1998). Die Geburt Europas aus dem Geist der Gewalt. Eroberung, Kolonisation und kultureller Wandel von 950 bis 1350 ( = [English original :] The Making of Europe : conquest, colonization, and cultural change 950–1350) (in German). Knaur München. ISBN 3-426-60639-9.
- Kleineberg, A; Marx, Chr; Knobloch, E.; Lelgemann, D. (2010). Germania und die Insel Thule. Die Entschlüsselung von Ptolemaios' 'Atlas der Oikumene' (in German). WBG. ISBN 978-3-534-23757-9.
- Gründer, Horst; Johanek, Peter (2001). Kolonialstädte, europäische Enklaven oder Schmelztiegel der Kulturen?: Europäische Enklaven oder Schmelztiegel der Kulturen? (in German). LIT Verlag Münster. ISBN 3-8258-3601-0.
- Reuber, Paul; Strüver, Anke; Wolkersdorfer, Günter (2005). Politische Geographien Europas – Annäherungen an ein umstrittenes Konstrukt: Annäherungen an ein umstrittenes Konstrukt (in German). LIT Verlag Münster. ISBN 3-8258-6523-1.
- Demurger, Alain; Kaiser, Wolfgang (2003). Die Ritter des Herrn: Geschichte der Geistlichen Ritterorden (in German). C.H.Beck. ISBN 3-406-50282-2.
- Herbers, Klaus; Jaspert, Nikolas, eds. (2007). Grenzräume und Grenzüberschreitungen im Vergleich: Der Osten und der Westen des mittelalterlichen Lateineuropa (in German). De Gruyter. ISBN 978-3-05-004155-1.
- "Die Slawen in Deutschland. Geschichte und Kultur der slawischen Stämme westlich von Oder und Neiße : Joachim Herrmann, Autorenkollektiv: Amazon.de: Bücher". amazon.de (in German). June 23, 2023.
- Knefelkamp, Ulrich, ed. (2001). Zisterzienser: Norm, Kultur, Reform – 900 Jahre Zisterzienser (in German). Springer. ISBN 3-540-64816-X.
- Minahan, James (2000). "Germans". One Europe, Many Nations: A Historical Dictionary of European National Groups. Greenwood Publishing Group. ISBN 0-313-30984-1.
- Schich, Winfried (2007). Wirtschaft und Kulturlandschaft: Gesammelte Beiträge 1977 bis 1999 zur Geschichte der Zisterzienser und der 'Germania Slavica'. Bibliothek der brandenburgischen und preussischen Geschichte (in German). Vol. 12. BWV Verlag. ISBN 978-3-8305-0378-1.
- Rösener, Werner (1988). Agrarwirtschaft, Agrarverfassung und ländliche Gesellschaft im Mittelalter (in German). Oldenbourg. ISBN 3-486-55024-1.
- Schulman, Jana K. (2002). The Rise of the Medieval World, 500–1300: A Biographical Dictionary. Greenwood Press.
- Sommerfeld, Wilhelm von (2005) [1896]. Geschichte der Germanisierung des Herzogtums Pommern oder Slavien bis zum Ablauf des 13. Jahrhunderts (in German). Adamant Media Corporation. ISBN 1-4212-3832-2. (unabridged facsimile of the edition published by Duncker & Humblot, Leipzig 1896)
- Szabo, Franz A. J. (2008). Ingrao, Charles W. (ed.). The Germans and the East. Purdue University Press. ISBN 978-1-55753-443-9.
- Bartlett, Roger; Schönwälder, Karen, eds. (1999). The German Lands and Eastern Europe. London: Palgrave Macmillan UK. doi:10.1007/978-1-349-27094-1. ISBN 978-1-349-27096-5.
- Szende, Katalin (May 9, 2019). "Iure Theutonico? German settlers and legal frameworks for immigration to Hungary in an East-Central European perspective". Journal of Medieval History. 45 (3). Routledge: 360–379. doi:10.1080/03044181.2019.1612195. hdl:20.500.14018/13997. ISSN 0304-4181.
- Kowalski, Mariusz (2020). "The Early Mediaeval Slav-German border (Limes Sorabicus) in the light of research into Y-chromosome polymorphism in contemporary and historical German populations". researchgate.net. Geographia Polonica.
