= Gunther, Margrave of Merseburg =

German noble

Gunther (German: Günther; around 930-949 - 13 July 982) was the Margrave of Merseburg from 965 until his death, upon which the march of Merseburg was united to that of Meissen.

Gunther was a scion of the Ekkeharding noble family first recorded around Naumburg, which may be affiliated with the Ottonian dynasty. In 962, he was already regarded as a margrave in the newly created Diocese of Magdeburg, alongside Count Wigger of Bilstein and Wigbert.

He was appointed to the newly created Merseburger march by Emperor Otto I following the death of Margrave Gero the Great in 965, after which the Marca Geronis was split in several smaller parts. The establishment of the march was followed by the Merseburg diocese under Bishop Boso in 968.

Gunther supported Duke Henry II the Quarrelsome of Bavaria in his revolt against Emperor Otto II and was therefore deposed as margrave and banished in 976, while his march fell to Thietmar of Meissen. Gunther nevertheless became reconciled with Otto II and after Thietmar's death in 979 was reinstalled as margrave.

He joined Otto's campaign in Calabria in 982 and died there in the Battle of Stilo against the Saracens. He was succeeded by Rikdag, who then united the marches of Meissen, Merseburg and Zeitz under his rule.

According to chronicler Thietmar of Merseburg, Gunther may have been married to Dobrawa, daughter of Duke Boleslaus the Cruel of Bohemia, who would go on to be the wife of Duke Mieszko I of Poland from 965. He left three sons: Eckard I, who succeededed Rikdag as Margrave of Meissen in 985; Gunzelin of Kuckenburg, who followed his brother in 1002, and Bruno, who defended Meissen against the troops of duke Bolesław I Chrobry of Poland in 1009.

== Sources ==
- Reuter, Timothy (1991). Germany in the Early Middle Ages 800–1056. Longman.
- Warner, David, ed. (2001). Ottonian Germany: The Chronicon of Thietmar of Merseburg. Manchester University Press.

Preceded by new creation	Margrave of Merseburg; 965–976	Succeeded by Thietmar
Preceded by Thietmar	Margrave of Merseburg; 979–982	Succeeded by Rikdag
