= Gero =

German nobleman (c. 900 – 965)

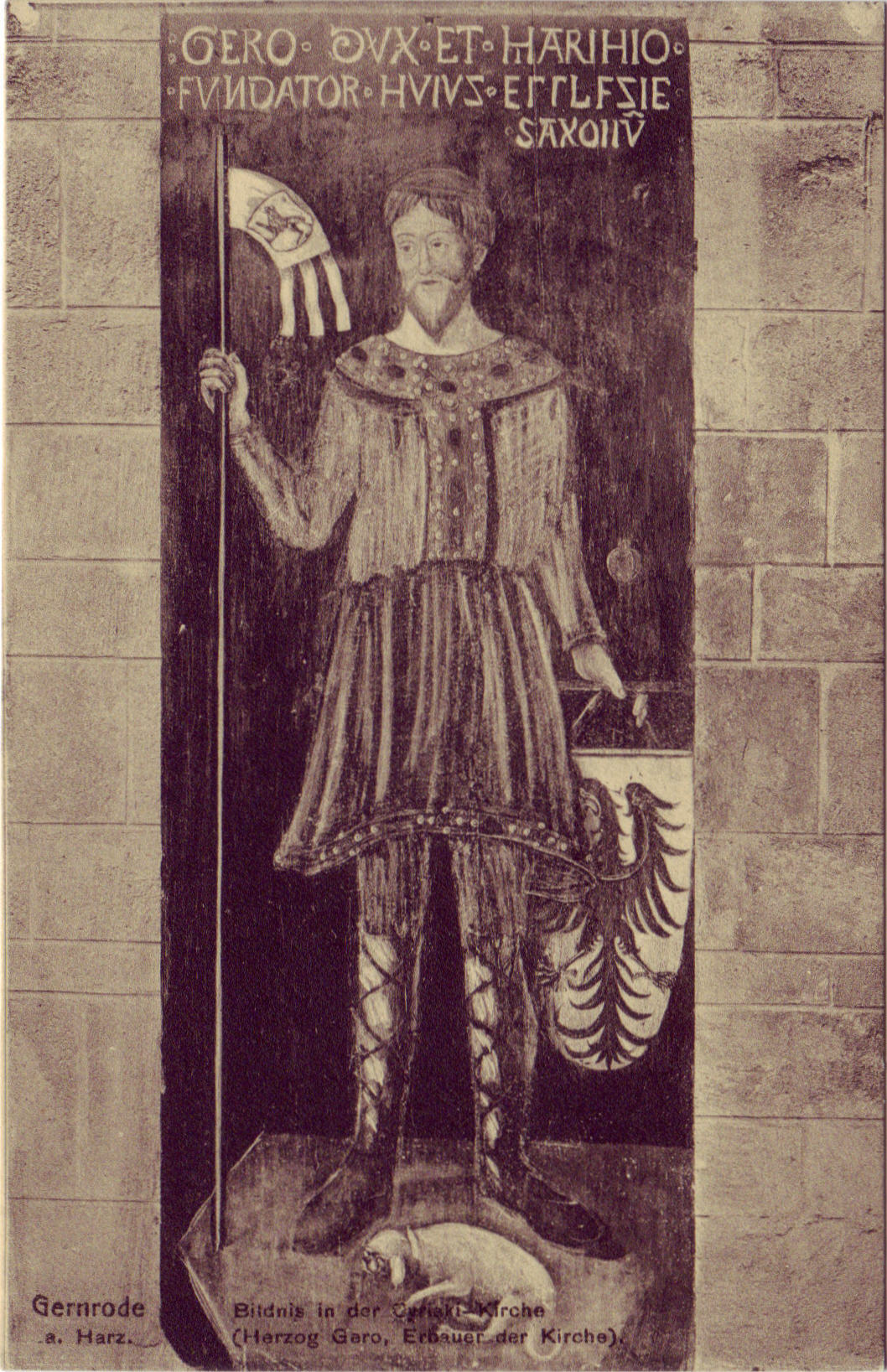
14th-century wall painting depicting Gero in the church he founded at Gernrode

Gero I (c. 900 – 20 May 965), sometimes called the Great (Latin: magnus), was a prominent German noble from the Duchy of Saxony in the East Francia, who held several offices during the reign of king and later emperor Otto I (936–973). As one of the most notable counts in northern regions of Otto's realm, Gero was appointed as king's representative (legate) in the Saxon duchy. He was also appointed as margrave (Latin: marchio), thus ranking above other counts. The nature and scope of his jurisdiction as margrave was indicated in several sources, such as the Thietmar's Chronicle from the beginning of the 11th century, that mentions Gero as Margrave of the East (Latin: Gero Orientalium marchio). Since various sources provide data on Gero's continuous and frequent involvement in German expansion towards the lands of Polabian Slavs, that lied to the east of Saxon and Thuringian lands, traditional historiography regarded Gero as margrave over the subdued Slavic regions, thus coining the term March of Gero (Latin: Marca Geronis). Newer scholarly analyses have shown that some charters that contain data on Gero's march (frontier region) should be considered as later forgeries, thus leading modern researchers to question or reject various traditional views regarding the nature and effective scope of such a frontier province in the middle of the 10th century.

In traditional historiography, it was assumed that Gero's march was initially centred on Merseburg, in the present German state of Saxony-Anhalt, and gradually expanded into a vast territory, encompassing almost all lands of Polabian Slavs, thus viewing Gero as leader of early German Ostsiedlung (settlement of the East).

== Succession and early conflicts ==
Gero was the son of Count Thietmar, tutor of Henry the Fowler. Some scholars assume that he was appointed by king Otto I to succeed his brother, Siegfried, as count and margrave in the district fronting the Wends on the lower Saale in 937. His appointment frustrated Thankmar, the king's half-brother and Siegfried's cousin, and together with Eberhard of Franconia and Wichmann the Elder, he revolted against the king (938). Thankmar was dead within a year and his accomplices came to terms with Otto. Gero kept his march.

During the insurrection of his opponents, Gero had been prosecuting a losing war against the Slavs in 937–938. The losses his troops sustained could not be made up for by the produce of the land nor by tribute, since the Slavs refused to pay. As an important marcher lord, Gero's command included milites ad manum Geronis presidis conscripti, that is, a "military following," "warband of vassals or companions," or "specially chosen group of fighters" differentiated from the rest of the army (exercitus). These men formed the elite of Gero's troops.

== Campaigns against Slavs ==
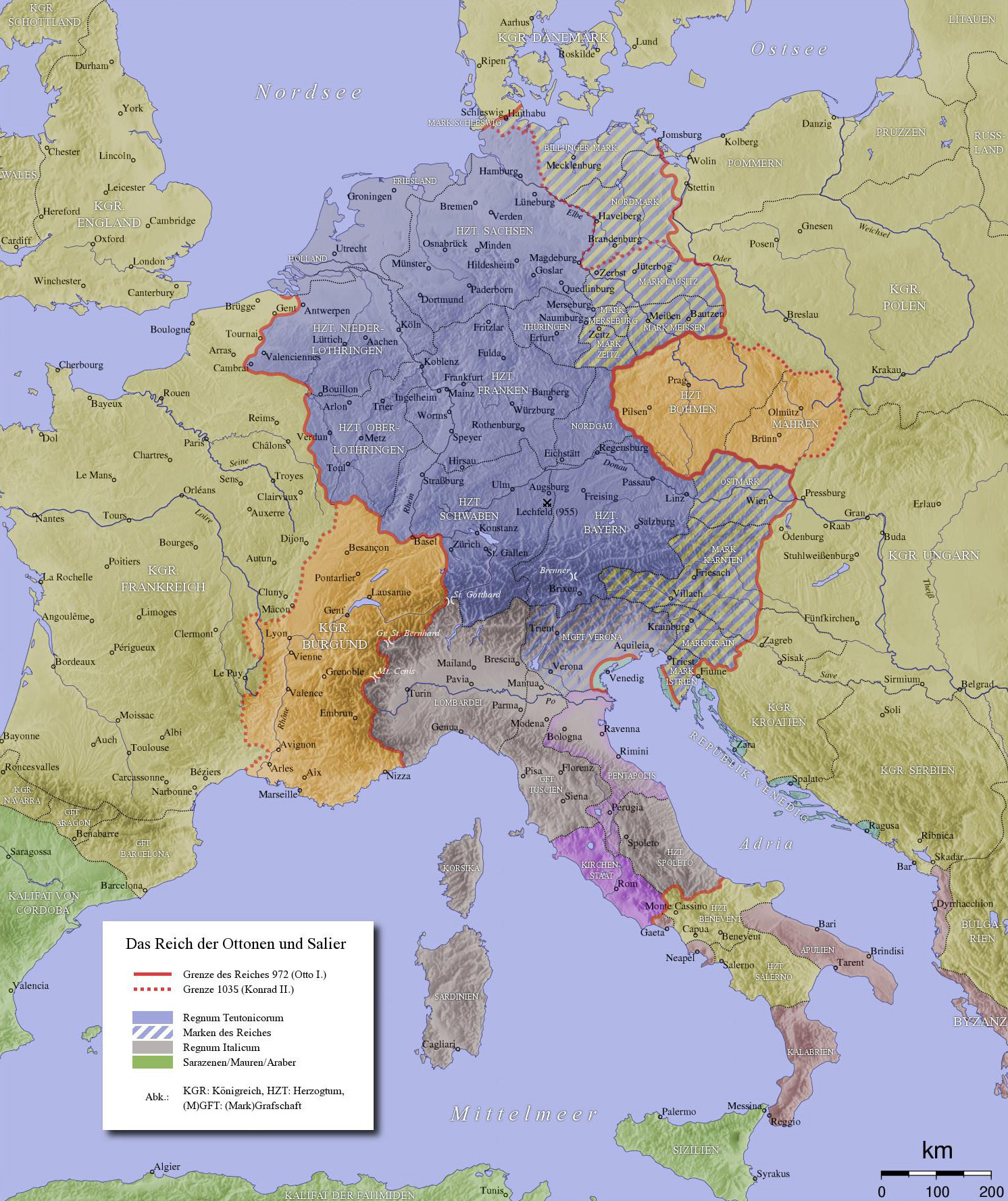
The marca Geronis (hatched) corresponds to the southern three quarters of the Saxon marches: Nordmark, Lausitz, Merseburg, Meissen and Zeitz.

In 939, an Obodrite attack left a Saxon army routed and its margravial leader dead. Gero in revenge invited thirty Slav chieftains to a banquet whereat he killed all but one, who managed to escape by accident. In response, the Stodorani revolted against German overlordship and chased the Germans across the Elbe, but Gero was able to reverse this before Otto's arrival in Magdeburg later in the year. He subsequently bribed Tugumir, a baptised Slav prince, to betray his countrymen and make his people subject to Germany. Soon after, the Obodrites and the Wilzes made submission.

In 954, while Gero was away, the Ukrani (or Ucri) revolted, but Gero returned with Conrad the Red and pacified them.

In 955, some Saxon counts rebelled and were banished by Duke Herman. They found refuge in Swetlastrana, a Slav town, location unknown (maybe current Berlin-Lichtenberg), where the Obodrite chiefs Nakon and Stoinegin (or Stojgnev) resided. There Herman besieged them until an agreement was reached, but an ensuing skirmish spoiled the peace. The Obodrites, Wilzes, Chrepienyani, Redarii and Dolenzi then banded together to oppose the coming army of Gero, the king, and Liudolf, Duke of Swabia. After negotiations failed because of the Germans' harsh terms, the Slavs were defeated in battle on the Drosa.

Gero participated in general Saxon campaigns against the Slavs in 957, 959, and 960, as well as campaigning against the Wends and forcing Mieszko I of the Polans to pay tribute, grant land lien, and recognise German sovereignty during Otto's absence in Italy (962–963). Lusatia, according to Widukind, was subjected "to the last degree of servitude". Gero was responsible for subjecting the Liutizi and Milzini (or Milciani) and extending German suzerainty over the whole territory between the Elbe and the Bober. In these lands, the native Slavic populace was reduced to serfdom and "tribute-paying peoples" were converted into "census-paying peasants".

== Relationship with Church and family ==
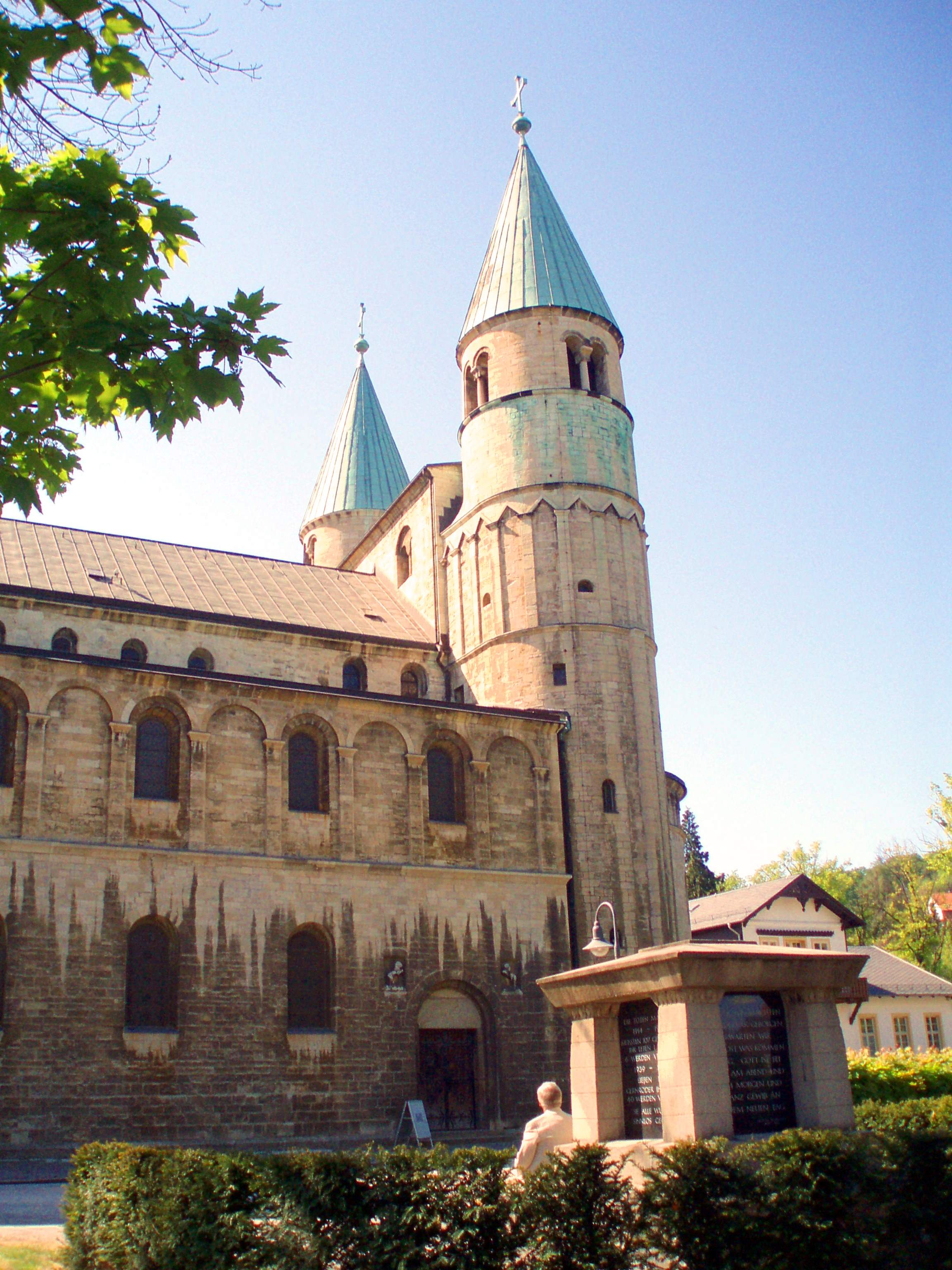
The church of St. Cyriakus at Gernrode

Gero had a close relationship to Otto I. Otto was godfather to Gero's eldest son, Siegfried, and he granted Siegfried the villae of Egeln and Westeregeln in the Schwabengau in 941. As an act of devotion, Gero made a pilgrimage to Rome in 959 after Siegfried's death. In Siegfried's name, in 960, he also founded a Romanesque collegiate church, St Cyriakus, and the abbey of Gernrode, in a forest named after him, Geronisrode (Gernrode), and left a large part of his great wealth to it on his death. The church and abbey were dedicated to St. Cyriacus, and the abbey was a convent, housing nuns and canonesses.

Gero's second son, Gero II, had already died at that point. The name of Gero's wife has to be hypothesised from libri memoriales: it was either Judith (Iudita) or Thietsuuind (Thietswind).

== Death and division of territory ==
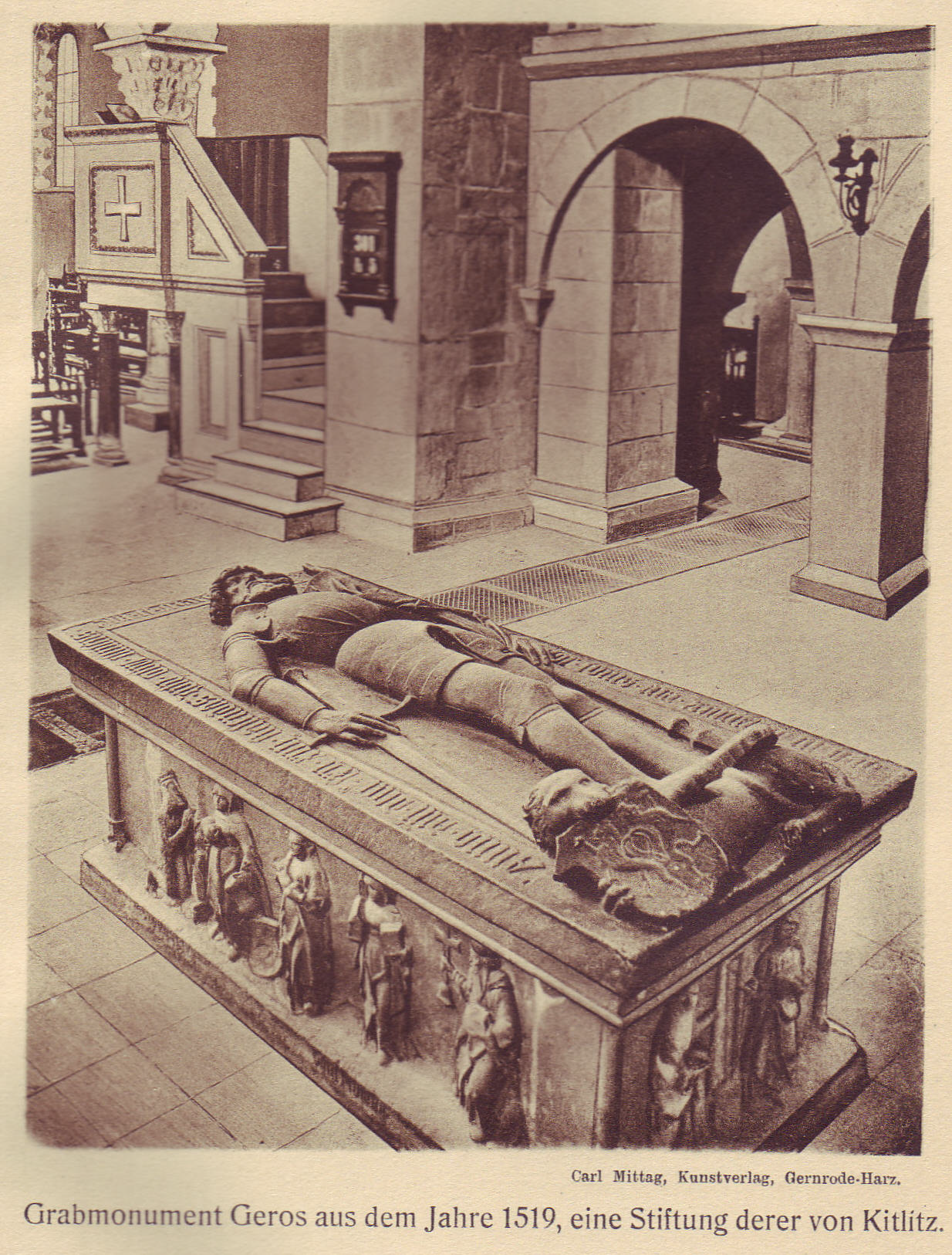
The tomb of Gero the Great.

At his death, Gero's march extended as far as the Neisse river. He was not popular with the Saxon nobility of his day, because he had a strong sense of moral rectitude and was of low birth. Nonetheless, he became celebrated in the Nibelungenlied as the marcgrâve Gêre, though it has been disputed whether he was ever officially accorded that title. Gero's tomb can still be seen in Gernrode today. A decorative painting was added to it c. 1350. It depicts Gero standing over a vanquished Wend.

After his death, the huge territory he had conquered was divided by Emperor Otto II into several different marches: the Northern March (under Dietrich of Haldensleben), the Eastern March (under Odo I), the March of Meissen (under Wigbert), the March of Merseburg (under Günther) and the March of Zeitz (under Wigger I). Later the Northern March was subdivided into the marches of Landsberg, Lusatia and Brandenburg.

The division of Gero's "super-march" probably had something to do with its immense size and the political consideration of trying to please many without making enemies. The subdivisions into which it was divided, however, were natural. As early as 963, Lusatia—and even upper and lower Lusatia—and the Ostmark were distinguishable as governable provinces within Gero's march.

The primary chronicle sources for Gero's life are those of Widukind of Corvey and Thietmar of Merseburg, on which most of the work in the secondary sources is based.

== See also ==
- Saint Cyriakus, Gernrode

== Sources ==
- Bernhardt, John W. Itinerant Kingship and Royal Monasteries in Early Medieval Germany, c. 936–1075. Cambridge: Cambridge University Press, 1993.
- Dvornik, F. "The First Wave of the Drang Nach Osten." Cambridge Historical Journal, Vol. 7, No. 3. (1943), pp 129–145.
- Howorth, H. H. "The Spread of the Slaves. Part III. The Northern Serbs or Sorabians and the Obodriti." The Journal of the Anthropological Institute of Great Britain and Ireland, Vol. 9. (1880), pp 181–232.
- Jakubowska, Bogna. "Salve Me Ex Ore Leonis." Artibus et Historiae, Vol. 12, No. 23. (1991), pp. 53–65.
- Leyser, Karl. "Ottonian Government." The English Historical Review, Vol. 96, No. 381. (Oct. 1981), pp 721–753.
- Lang, Henry Joseph. "The Fall of the Monarchy of Mieszko II, Lambert." Speculum, Vol. 49, No. 4. (Oct. 1974), pp 623–639.
- Leyser, Karl. "Henry I and the Beginnings of the Saxon Empire." The English Historical Review, Vol. 83, No. 326. (Jan. 1968), pp 1–32.
- Reuter, Timothy (2013) [1991]. Germany in the Early Middle Ages c. 800–1056. London and New York: Routledge.
- Schölkopf Ruth, Genealogie Mittelalter: Mittelalterliche Genealogie im Deutschen Reich bis zum Ende der Staufer. "Die sächsischen Grafen 919–1024."
- Stieldorf, Andrea (2026) [2012]. Marken und Markgrafen: Studien zur Grenzsicherung durch die fränkisch-deutschen Herrscher (2nd ed.). Wiesbaden: Harrassowitz Verlag.
- Thompson, James Westfall. Feudal Germany, Volume II. New York: Frederick Ungar Publishing Co., 1928.
- "Gero (Markgraf)." Allgemeine Deutsche Biographie, by the Historischen Kommission of the Bayrischen Akademie der Wissenschaften, Band 9, Seite 38. (retrieved 29 May 2007, 15:09 UTC)
