= Barony of Bilstein =

The Barony of Bilstein (German: Herrschaft Bilstein) was a dynastic lordship with extensive estates in the region of the present German states of Hesse and Thuringia and a territory of the Holy Roman Empire.

== History ==
=== Wigger counts ===
The barony probably began with Count Wigger I. He is recorded to have had extensive comital rights and estates in the Germarmark march on the middle Werra (the area of Frieda and Eschwege), at Hainich (Bad Langensalza, Schlotheim, Mühlhausen and Oberdorla) and in the Obereichsfeld from 967 to 981 AD. The fragmented estates of Count Wigger extended via Dornburg an der Saale as far as the area of Zeitz, where he is mentioned from 965 to 981 as the March of Zeitz. Along with the Ekkehardiner, the counts of Kevernburg, the counts of Schwarzburg and counts of Weimar, the Wiggers were a powerful comital family in Thuringia in the 10th through 12th centuries.

=== Counts of Bilstein ===
Starting in about 1130 AD, the Wiggers' descendants named themselves after their family seat, Bilstein Castle, which is located in the Höllental valley west of Albungen, today a village in the borough of Eschwege. This castle is estimated to have been built by them around 1100 AD. In this period they came into military conflict with the counts of Northeim, who around 1105/1110 AD had defeated Count Rugger (Rüdiger) I of Bilstein and destroyed the first, weakly fortified Bielstein Castle. Count Rugger's successor, Rugger II of Bilstein, asserted himself with the construction of the new Bilstein Castle and began to develop the woods around the castle on the Hoher Meißner, as "clearing demesne." For this purpose he also founded Germerode Abbey, which became the family abbey of the dynasty. The descriptive family name, the Bilsteiners, was later appended to the early members of the house.

=== Burgraves ===
In the 12th century, the ruling dynasty of the Ludovingians needed to place all responsibility for the management of the castle of Wartburg, particularly its security and the improvement of the fortifications, into the hands of an authorised representative. This person held the office of Burgrave of the Wartburg. With the appointment of the counts of Wartburg, who appear at the same time in the 13th century as the burgraves of Brandenburg at the neighbouring Brandenburg Castle, a sideline of the counts of Bilstein were elevated to high status, although they were not related by blood to the Ludowingian family.

=== Decline and end ===
In 1301, Count Otto II of Bilstein, with the consent of his wife, Catharina, sold the Bilstein fief and subsequently also his allodial estate to Landgrave Henry I of Hesse. With his death in 1306 the comital line came to an end.

=== Links to other aristocratic families ===
There is evidence that the counts of Bilstein were related to the lords of Bilstein in Westphalia.

According to the Reinhardsbrunn Chronicle by monk, Johannes Caput, from Ilfeld Abbey an Elger of Bilstein on the Werra built the Ilburg and called himself the Count of Ilfeld. In 1162 a nobleman of Ilfeld married Lutrude of Hohnstein and called himself thereafter Ilfeld-Hohnstein and, from 1182, just von Hohnstein.

== Bearers of the name ==
- Wigger I (962), Margrave of the Germarmark (around Mühlhausen)
- Wigger II
- Rugger I (1071), had comital rights in Martinfeld (near Heiligenstadt)
- Rugger II, Count of Bilstein, founded Germerode Abbey
- Otto II of Bilstein was the last male member of the family line. In 1301 he sold the Bilstein fief and, subsequently, also his allodial estate to Landgrave Henry I of Hesse and died in 1306.

== Literature ==
- Karl Kollmann (1980), Historische Gesellschaft des Werratals (ed.), Die Grafen Wigger und die Grafen von Bilstein (in German), Bischhausen/Eschwege
- Gustav Eisentraut (1902), Verein für Hessische Geschichte und Landeskunde (ed.), Der Bilstein im Höllental bei Albungen (und benachbarte Befestigungen) (in German), vol. 14
