= Rikdag =

Margrave of Meissen from 979 to 985

- Margrave of Meissen
- Reign: 979–985
- Died: c. 985
- Buried: Gerbstedt Abbey
- Spouse: ?
- Father: Volkmar I, Count of the Harzgau (?)
- Mother: ?

Rikdag, also called Ricdag, Riddag, or Rihdag (died 985), was Margrave of Meissen from 979 until his death. In 982, he also acquired the marches of Merseburg and Zeitz. After the Great Slav Rising in 983, he temporarily reunited all of the southern marca Geronis under his command. His march included the territory of the Chutizi and Dolomici tribes.

== Life ==
Rikdag possibly is a progenitor of the House of Wettin, the son of Volkmar I (d. before 961), a Saxon count in the Harzgau. He is mentioned as an agnatic relative of Theodoric I of Wettin, who was raised at the Meissen court, however, the exact circumstances of their family relationship are not known.

Ricdag's daughter, Oda or Hunilda, married Boleslaus I the Brave, who later became the King of Poland. However, this marriage alliance was cut short by the interests of power politics.

Rikdag was documented as a count in the Schwabengau region of Eastphalia. In 979 he followed Margrave Thietmar in the Margraviate of Meissen and in 982 was enfeoffed with the Merseburg and Zeitz marches, succeeding both Margrave Gunther and Margrave Wigger I.

In 983, following word of the defeat of Emperor Otto II at the Battle of Stilo against the Kalbid Emirate of Sicily, the Slavic tribes bordering eastern Saxony rebelled. The episcopal seats of Havelberg and Brandenburg were destroyed and the March of Zeitz devastated. Ricdag and Dietrich of the Nordmark joined with the troops of Gisilher, Archbishop of Magdeburg and the Bishop of Halberstadt and defeated the Slavs at Belkesheim, near Stendal, on this map, you will see the region (heim) called from latin Belesem which from Latin to german can be translated as "Belkes", so the "Belkesheim" is not a name of an actual village or town, but rather the name of the entire region (heim) where the battle took place, likely a vast meadow on the outskirts of Stendal.

In 985, Ricdag and his sister, Eilsuit, founded the nunnery of Gerbstedt, in which he was buried and she was first abbess. Ricdag's and Dietrich's deaths in that same year were a severe setback on the middle border. By an unnamed wife, Ricdag, beside the aforementioned Oda, left a son and another daughter: Charles (died 28 April 1014), who was count in the Schwabengau in 992 and who was unjustly deprived of his benefices because of false accusations, and Gerburga (died 30 October 1022), who was later abbess of Quedlinburg.

Preceded by Thietmar	Margrave of Meissen; 979–985	Succeeded by Eckard I
Preceded by Gunther	Margrave of Merseburg; 982–985	Succeeded by Eckard I
Preceded by Wigger I	Margrave of Zeitz; 982–985	Succeeded by Eckard I
