= Wigger I =

Count of the Holy Roman Empire (925–981)

- Baron of Bilstein
- Tenure: 967 – 981
- Successor: Wigger II
- Born: Wigger von Zeitz; 925; Zeitz, Thuringia, Holy Roman Empire
- Died: 981 (aged 55–56)
- Noble family: House of Bilstein
- Father: Siegfried I

Wigger I von Zeitz (925 – 981) was the father of a line of counts ruling from Bilstein Castle, west of Albungen (today part of Eschwege) to the Werra. The counts of Bilstein played a prominent role in Thuringia from 967 to 1301 and were third after the Ekkehardinger and Weimar-Orlamünde in terms of power and influence.

== Life and death ==
Wigger was probably the second son of Siegfried, Count of Merseburg, and thus a nephew of Gero the Great. On his uncle's death in 965, he was granted the March of Zeitz. For a time he was also the Margrave of Merseburg and possibly the March of Meissen. He had extensive estates — Langensalza, Mühlhausen, Schlotheim, Frieda, Dornburg an der Saale, and Eschwege — and comital authority in the Eichsfeld and the middle Werra. He was count of the Germar-Mark (east of Mühlhausen), Weitagau, and Ducharingau (area of Zeitz and Naumburg). He was also the advocate (vogt) of the Diocese of Zeitz.

He was a faithful follower of the Ottonians. He participated in their wars on the Slavic peoples to the east and was created count in the Plisnagau and the Puonzowagau. He and his brother Dedi founded the convent of Drübeck near Wernigerode. In 981, Wigger gave his propriety interests in the convent to Otto II.

Wigger died in 981 and was succeeded in the Germarmark and the Watergau by his son Wigger II. His march was bestowed on Ricdag and the remainder of his possessions went to Eckard I of Meissen.

== Sources ==
- Bernhardt, John W. Itinerant Kingship and Royal Monasteries in Early Medieval Germany, c.936–1075. Cambridge: Cambridge University Press, 1993.
