= Saxon Eastern March =

Border March in the Holy Roman Empire

Saxon Eastern March Sächsische Ostmark
- March of the Holy Roman Empire
- 965–1128
- Territories of the Saxon Eastern March (Lusatia, Meissen, Merseburg, and Zeitz) after the 983 Great Slav Rising
- History
  - Established: 965
  - Disestablished: 1128

The Saxon Eastern March (German: Sächsische Ostmark) is a historiographical term, derived from titles and offices of various German frontier counts, who were appointed margraves (Latin: marchio) in eastern frontier regions, adjacent to the Duchy of Saxony, within the Holy Roman Empire, from the 10th until the 12th century. The scope and nature of their jurisdictions as margraves was indicated in several sources, such as the Thietmar's Chronicle from the beginning of the 11th century, that mentions a prominent Saxon noble Gero (d. 965) as Margrave of the East (Latin: Gero Orientalium marchio). Based on such and similar sources, the term eastern march (Latin: marchia orientalis) was used by early scholars to create a descriptive term Saxon Eastern March, in order to designate a frontier region (march) on eastern Saxon borders, encompassing various lands of Polabian Slavs, subdued to German kings. Newer scholarly analyses have shown that some charters that contain data on marches in those regions should be considered as later forgeries, thus leading modern researchers to question or reject various traditional views regarding the evolution and effective existence of various frontier provinces, as described in older historiography.

The term Saxon Eastern March was modeled on the similar term Bavarian Eastern March, designating a historical march that was situated on the eastern border of the Duchy of Bavaria: the Bavarian marchia Orientalis (documented as Ostarrîchi in 996), corresponding to later Austria.

== History ==
The Saxon Ostmark initially referred to the vast Marca Geronis ('Gero's March'), established about 939 under the rule of King Otto I in the settlement area of the Polabian Slavs (Sorbs), beyond the Saxon Eastern border on the Elbe and Saale rivers. The conquered territories were governed by the Eastphalian legate Gero, count in the Nordthüringgau, who was vested with the Carolingian title of margrave. It was his task to collect tributes and to overcome revolts or rebellions in the frontier areas, later partly superseded by Otto's Saxon deputy Hermann Billung. In 963, Gero in late age waged another military campaign against the Slavic Lusatian (Lusici) tribes, up to the border with the Polish lands ruled by Mieszko I.

After Gero had died without heirs in 965, the tributary lands were divided and re-organised by the establishment of the Northern March around Brandenburg, stretching between the Elbe and Oder rivers, as well as the creation of the March of Lusatia, the March of Meissen, the March of Merseburg and the March of Zeitz in the south. The rule over the Northern March was again lost in the Great Slav Rising of 983.

Thereupon, the Saxon Eastern March consisted of the territory between the Saale in the west and the Bóbr in the east. Emperor Otto I invested the Saxon count Odo (Hodo), one of Gero's relatives, with the title of margrave of the March of Lusatia, an area roughly corresponding to the modern region of Lower Lusatia, which became the heartland of the remaining Saxon Eastern March.

During the German-Polish War from 1002 to 1018, Odo's successor Gero II lost the eastern part of the march to Bolesław I of Poland. Nevertheless, Bolesław's son Mieszko II had to return the conquered territory to Emperor Conrad II in 1031. In 1046, Dedi I from the Saxon House of Wettin inherited the march. His son and successor Henry I was, in addition, granted the March of Meissen by Emperor Henry IV in 1089. Both marches remained under Wettin administration and later became the nucleus of the Saxon Electorate.

While the Margraviate of Landsberg and the County of Brehna split off from the march, further parts in the west were claimed by the Ascanian Dukes of Saxe-Wittenberg and the Counts of Anhalt. The remaining areas were united with the Wettin margraviate of Meissen in 1123. The last time that the Ostmark and Lusatia appear separate is when Henry of Groitzsch received the former in 1128 and the latter in 1131. Henry, however, did not prevail, and by 1136, the march had fallen back to the Wettin margrave Conrad of Meissen. During the various divisions of the Wettin lands, the territory was split up several times; most of it belonged to the Ernestine duchies.

The term Osterland (terra orientalis) is still used today to describe the historic region east of the Saale in the present-day states of Thuringia, Saxony and Saxony-Anhalt, which was once at the centre of the march. While the borders of the Ostmark changed frequently, in modern times, the term is generally understood to mean the area between the Saale and Mulde rivers.

== List of margraves ==
- Odo I, 965–993
- Gero II, 993–1015
- Thietmar, 1015–1030
- Odo II, 1030–1032
- Bolesław the Brave, 1002–1025
- Mieszko Lambert, 1025–1031
- Dedi I, 1046–1075
- Dedi II, fl. 1069
- Henry I, 1075–1103
- Henry II, 1103–1123
- Wiprecht, 1123–1124
- Albert, 1123–1128
- Henry III, 1128–1135

Hereafter better known as margraves of Lusatia.

== Sources ==
- Reuter, Timothy (2013) [1991]. Germany in the Early Middle Ages c. 800–1056. London and New York: Routledge.
- Stieldorf, Andrea (2026) [2012]. Marken und Markgrafen: Studien zur Grenzsicherung durch die fränkisch-deutschen Herrscher (2nd ed.). Wiesbaden: Harrassowitz Verlag.
- Thompson, James Westfall. Feudal Germany, Volume II. New York: Frederick Ungar Publishing Co., 1928.
- At Meyers Konversationslexikon, 1888
- At Zeidlers Universal-Lexicon, vol. 25, p. 1163-1164
