= March of Merseburg =

Territorial scope of the March Merseburg (red) as proposed by the traditional 19th century historiography

The March of Merseburg (German: Mark Merseburg) is a historiographical term, devised by early modern scholars, who were assuming that a distinctive march (frontier province), encompassing the territory of the Bishopric of Merseburg and centered at the Saxon city of Merseburg (Upper Sorbian: Mjezybor), was created sometime around 968 by German king and emperor Otto I (936-973). Newer scholarly analyses have shown that primary sources do not mention a distinctive march under such name at that time, also noting that copies of some charters that contain data on those regions should be considered as interpolated or even forged, thus leading modern researchers to question or reject traditional views regarding the nature and territorial scope of a distinctive march centered on Merseburg, as described in older historiography.

During the 10th and 11th centuries, Merseburg was one of the most important German cities in frontier regions towards the Polabian Slavs, with a fortified castle and a Königspfalz (royal residence). Since the city belonged to the region Hassegau in Eastphalia, within the Duchy of Saxony, that territory was previously governed by local counts, such as Siegfried (d. 937), who was also the royal governor of the entire Duchy of Saxony during the last years of reign of king Henry I (919-936), and also at the beginning of the reign of king Otto I (936-973). At that time, Merseburg was a frontier city on the very border towards the neighboring Slavs, and thus in traditional historiography Siegfried is sometimes also mentioned as the margrave of Merseburg, but that title is not attributed to him in primary sources, such as contemporary royal charters, and thus is used in literature conditionally, in order to emphasize the frontier character of Siegfried's post.

== Traditional views ==
According to 19th century German scholars, March of Merseburg was a short-lived march of the Holy Roman Empire. It comprised the lands of the Polabian Slavs beyond the margravial residence at Merseburg on the Saale river. Like the neighbouring marches of Meissen and Zeitz, the Merseburg march was created by Emperor Otto I by 968, in the division of the vast Marca Geronis east of the Elbe and Saale rivers, following the death of Margrave Gero in 965.

The first and only margrave at Merseburg was Gunther who had rendered services accompanying Otto on his Italian campaigns. However, when Gunther participated in the revolt of Duke Henry II of Bavaria, he was deposed as margrave in 976 and lost his territory to Margrave Thietmar of Meissen. Shortly before his death in the 982 Battle of Stilo, Gunther reconciled with Emperor Otto II and his march was restored. Upon Gunther's death, Merseburg was reunited with the marches of Meissen and Zeitz under the rule of Margrave Rikdag of Meissen, who thus temporarily reunited all of the southern Marca Geronis save the Saxon Eastern March.

== See also ==
- Polabian Slavs
- Sorbs (tribe)
- Slavic revolt of 983

== Sources ==
- Bernhardt, John W. (1993). Itinerant Kingship and Royal Monasteries in Early Medieval Germany, c. 936-1075. Cambridge: Cambridge University Press.
- Bachrach, Bernard S.; Bachrach, David S., eds. (2014). Widukind of Corvey: Deeds of the Saxons. Washington: The Catholic University of America Press.
- Stieldorf, Andrea (2026) [2012]. Marken und Markgrafen: Studien zur Grenzsicherung durch die fränkisch-deutschen Herrscher (2nd ed.). Wiesbaden: Harrassowitz Verlag.
- Warner, David A., ed. (2001). Ottonian Germany: The Chronicon of Thietmar of Merseburg. Manchester and New York: Manchester University Press.
