= Marca Geronis =

Border region in the tenth century

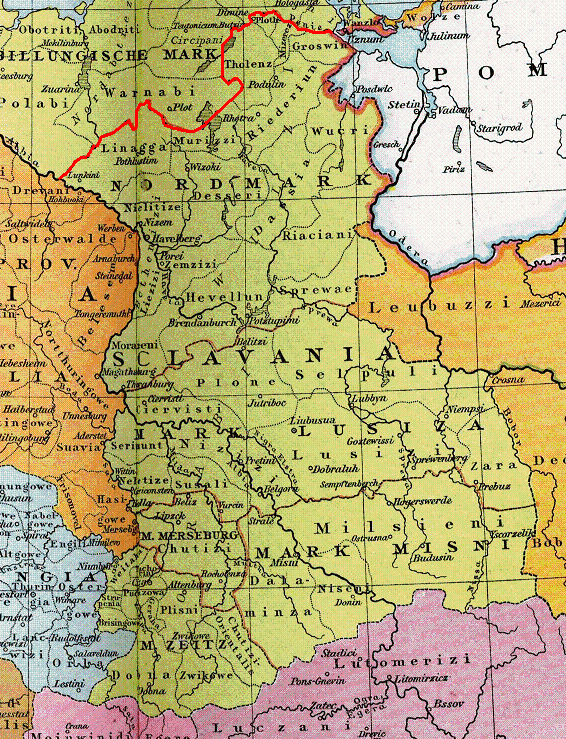
The scope of territorial jurisdiction of Gero I (green regions, up to the red line), as held in traditional historiography

The Marca Geronis or March of Gero is a historiographical term, derived from titles and offices of early medieval military commanders and governors of various German frontier jurisdictions in lands of Polabian Slavs. In primary sources, such as the Thietmar's Chronicle, the term was used in relation to count Gero II (d. 1015), whose frontier province (march) was mentioned as the count Gero’s march (Latin: Geronis marcham comitis; German: Mark des Grafen Gero). In later historiography, the same term was borrowed and reapplied as a descriptive designation for an earlier frontier jurisdiction of count Gero I (d. 965), a prominent noble from the Duchy of Saxony, who was appointed margrave (Latin: marchio) by king and emperor Otto I (936-973). The nature and scope of his jurisdiction as a margrave is indicated in several sources, such as the 11th century Thietmar's Chronicle, that mentions Gero I as Margrave of the East (Latin: Gero Orientalium marchio; German: Markgraf Gero von der Ostmark).

Various sources contain data on frequent and continuous involvement of margrave Gero I in German expansion towards the east, into the lands of Polabian Slavs, and thus in traditional (early modern) historiography he was regarded not only as frontier commander, but also as an effective provincial governor in the subdued Slavic regions, thus applying the term March of Gero for his province too. Newer scholarly analyses have shown that copies of some charters that contain data on early German marches in Slavic regions should be considered as interpolated or even forged, thus leading modern researches to question or reject various traditional views regarding the scope and effective existence of some frontier jurisdictions, as described in older historiography.

Among complexities involved in ascertaining the territoriality of the march over which Gero I ruled is the nature of the margravial title and office in tenth-century Saxony, and Germany in general, since it may have signified territorial governance, or a military command over a frontier region, with additional duties regarding the collecting of tributes from dependent peoples and tribes, as attested by activities of Gero I, but on the other hand may have been just an honorific title for especially powerful counts.

== Traditional views ==
According to traditional historiographical views, composed during the early modern period, the march of Gero I was a vast frontier region in the middle of the tenth century. Some historians have assumed that it was created even earlier, for count Thietmar in the 920s and passed consecutively to his two sons, Siegfried and Gero I. In those views, on Gero's death in 965, his vast march was divided into several different marches: the Nordmark, Ostmark, Meissen, Zeitz, and Merseburg.

Because Siegfried's and Gero's comital seat was Merseburg, it has sometimes been called the March of Merseburg. However, there was also a Merseburger march which grew out of it after 965. Because the central diocese in his march was Magdeburg, it was sometimes called the March of Magdeburg. Other historians prefer to call it the Saxon Eastern March or Saxon Ostmark, but these terms are also applied to another march which grew out of it in 965. Because the Marca Geronis was created simultaneously with the March of Billung to the north, it is sometimes said to be the southern half of the Ostmark. Some historians even call it the "March of Meissen." Within the span of one page, James Westfall Thompson refers to it as both the "Sorben Mark" and the "Thuringian March".

== Sources ==
- Bachrach, David S. (2020). "The Eastern Campaigns of King Henry II of Germany, 1003–17". Journal of Medieval Military History. 18: 1–36.
- Dvornik, F. "The First Wave of the Drang Nach Osten." Cambridge Historical Journal, Vol. 7, No. 3. (1943), pp 129–145.
- Howorth, H. H. "The Spread of the Slaves. Part III. The Northern Serbs or Sorabians and the Obodriti." The Journal of the Anthropological Institute of Great Britain and Ireland, Vol. 9. (1880), pp 181–232.
- Jakubowska, Bogna. "Salve Me Ex Ore Leonis." Artibus et Historiae, Vol. 12, No. 23. (1991), pp. 53–65.
- Lang, Henry Joseph. "The Fall of the Monarchy of Mieszko II, Lambert." Speculum, Vol. 49, No. 4. (Oct., 1974), pp 623–639.
- Leyser, Karl. "Ottonian Government." The English Historical Review, Vol. 96, No. 381. (Oct., 1981), pp 721–753.
- Leyser, Karl. "Henry I and the Beginnings of the Saxon Empire." The English Historical Review, Vol. 83, No. 326. (Jan., 1968), pp 1–32.
- Pech, Edmund (2015). "Milzener, Lusizer und Glomaci-Daleminzer: Kontroversen zur frühen Geschichte der Sorben". Lětopis: Zeitschrift für sorbische Sprache, Geschichte und Kultur: Časopis za rěč, stawizny a kulturu Łužiskich Serbow. 62 (2): 119–132.
- Reuter, Timothy (2013) [1991]. Germany in the Early Middle Ages c. 800–1056. London and New York: Routledge.
- Stieldorf, Andrea (2026) [2012]. Marken und Markgrafen: Studien zur Grenzsicherung durch die fränkisch-deutschen Herrscher (2nd ed.). Wiesbaden: Harrassowitz Verlag.
- Thompson, James Westfall. Feudal Germany, Volume II. New York: Frederick Ungar Publishing Co., 1928.
- Trillmich, Werner, ed. (1957). Thietmar von Merseburg: Chronik. Darmstadt: Wissenschaftliche Buchgesellschaf.
- Warner, David A., ed. (2001). Ottonian Germany: The Chronicon of Thietmar of Merseburg. Manchester and New York: Manchester University Press.
