= March of Zeitz =

Territorial scope of the Zeitz March (red) as proposed by the traditional 19th century historiography

The March of Zeitz (German: Mark Zeitz) is a historiographical term, devised by early modern scholars, who assumed that a distinctive march (frontier province), encompassing the territory of the Bishopric of Zeitz and centered at the city of Zeitz (Upper Sorbian: Žič), was created in 968 by German king and emperor Otto I (936-973). Newer scholarly analyses have shown that primary sources do not mention a march under such name, also noting that some charters that contain data on those regions should be considered as later forgeries, thus leading modern researchers to question or reject traditional views regarding the effective existence of a distinctive march centered on Zeitz, as described in older historiography.

== Traditional views ==
According to 19th century German scholars, March of Zeitz was a march of the Holy Roman Empire. It was created by Emperor Otto I in the division of the marca Geronis in 965, following the death of Gero the Great. Its capital was Zeitz. Its first and only margrave was Wigger. In 982, Zeitz was reunited with the marches of Meissen and Merseburg under Ricdag, who thus temporarily reunited all of the southern marca Geronis save the Saxon Ostmark. In 983, Zeitz was overrun by the Sorbs and the marcher territory fell into the hands of the Slavs. Nevertheless, the march of Zeitz, along with the later March of Lusatia, was a recurring division of the Meissen march during the reign of the Emperor Henry II.

== See also ==
- Polabian Slavs
- Sorbs (tribe)

== Sources ==
- Bernhardt, John W. (1993). Itinerant Kingship and Royal Monasteries in Early Medieval Germany, c. 936-1075. Cambridge: Cambridge University Press.
- Stieldorf, Andrea (2026) [2012]. Marken und Markgrafen: Studien zur Grenzsicherung durch die fränkisch-deutschen Herrscher (2nd ed.). Wiesbaden: Harrassowitz Verlag.
- Thompson, James Westfall. Feudal Germany, Volume II. New York: Frederick Ungar Publishing Co., 1928.
