= Siegfried, Count of Merseburg =

Count and Margrave of Merseburg (died 937)

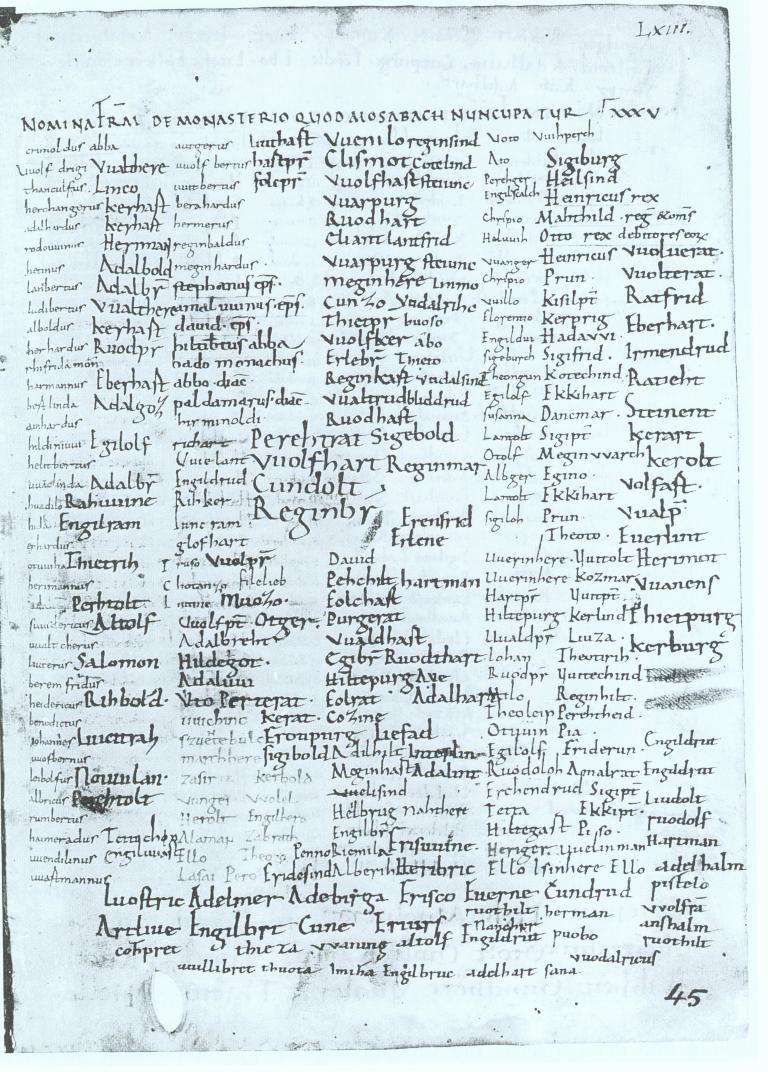
An 929 entry of Siegfried as "Sigifrid" in the listings of the Ottonian royal family and their cousins and prominent contemporaries, in the Reichenau Abbey manuscript (Zurich, Central Library, Rh. hist. 27, p. 63)

Siegfried (died 3 December 937) was a prominent German noble from the Duchy of Saxony in the East Francia, who was the Count of Merseburg in Eastphalia, from an unknown date before 934 until his death.

Since Merseburg was at that time a frontier city towards the Polabian Slavs, in traditional historiography Siegfried is sometimes also mentioned as the margrave of Merseburg, but that title is not attributed to him in primary sources, such as contemporary royal charters and diplomas, and thus is used in literature conditionally, in order to emphasize the frontier character of Siegfried's post.

Siegfried was probably the son of Thietmar, the tutor of Henry I of Germany. He was made procurator of the Duchy of Saxony in 936. Otto I put his younger brother Henry under the "protective custory" of Siegfried (or perhaps in Bavaria) during his coronation festivities. At that time, Siegfried was "second after the king," according to Widukind of Corvey.

When Siegfried died, his march was disputed between Thankmar, his cousin (through their mothers) and the king's brother, and Gero, his own brother and the king's appointee.

Siegfried's first wife was Ermenburg (Irminburg), daughter of Otto I, Duke of Saxony, and Hathui. His second wife (936) was Guthia (Guhtiu), who as a widow became the foundress and first abbess of Gröningen.

== Sources ==
- Bernhardt, John W. (1993). Itinerant Kingship and Royal Monasteries in Early Medieval Germany, c. 936–1075. Cambridge: Cambridge University Press.
- Reuter, Timothy (2013) [1991]. Germany in the Early Middle Ages c. 800–1056 (2nd ed.). London and New York: Routledge.
- Stieldorf, Andrea (2026) [2012]. Marken und Markgrafen: Studien zur Grenzsicherung durch die fränkisch-deutschen Herrscher (2nd ed.). Wiesbaden: Harrassowitz Verlag.
