= James Westfall Thompson =

American historian (1869–1941)

James Westfall Thompson (1869–1941) was an American historian specializing in the history of medieval and early modern Europe, particularly of the Holy Roman Empire and France. He also made noteworthy contributions to the history of literacy, libraries and the book trade in the Middle Ages.

== Biography ==
Born to a Dutch Reformed minister's family in Pella, Iowa, Thompson received an undergraduate degree from Rutgers University in 1892 and a PhD in history from the newly founded University of Chicago in 1895. Thompson remained at Chicago as a professor of history until 1933, when he left for the University of California, Berkeley. He remained at Berkeley until his death in 1941.

Thompson was one of the most prolific academics of his generation and wrote on a wide range of subjects, from the French Revolution to the economic structures of the Carolingian Empire to the history of espionage in early modern Europe. Some of his most important scholarly contributions came from his research on literacy and book collecting. His 1939 book The Literacy of the Laity in the Middle Ages remains a classic study of the subject. Thompson's two-volume study of the social and economic history of medieval Germany, Feudal Germany, appropriated elements of Frederick Jackson Turner's famous Frontier Thesis and applied them to the colonization of Slavic central Europe by German settlers in the Middle Ages.

Thompson served as president of the American Historical Association in 1941, but died before completing his term. His planned presidential address to the Association's annual meeting on the origins of critical historical scholarship in eighteenth-century France was edited by his students and published posthumously in the 1942 edition of the American Historical Review.

He is the namesake of the University of Chicago's Thompson Residence Hall, located in Pierce Tower.

Thompson was married to Anna Hawes Wilmarth (1873–1935) in 1897. They had a son, Wilmarth, and an adopted daughter, Frances. They divorced in 1909. Anna later married Harold L. Ickes.

== Bibliography ==
- The editando of the French monarchy under Louis VI., le Gros, 1108–1137. Chicago, University of Chicago Press, 1895.
- The wars of religion in France, 1559–1576; the Huguenots, Catherine de' Medici and Philip II, by James Westfall Thompson. Chicago, The University of Chicago press, 1909.
- The Frankfort book fair; the Francofordiense emporium of Henri Estienne, ed. with historical introduction, original Latin text with English translation on opposite pages and notes, by James Westfall Thompson. Chicago, Caxton Club, 1911; Reprint, Amsterdam, G. Th. van Heusden, 1969.
- Russian diplomacy and the war, by James Westfall Thompson. Pub. under the auspices of the Germanistic society of Chicago: Chicago? 1915.
- The French revolution from 1789 to 1815, by François Auguste Marie Mignet. Edited, with additional chapter on the hundred days, by James Westfall Thompson. New York: Collier, c. 1916.
- The lost oracles; a masque, by James Westfall Thompson. Chicago, W. M. Mill, c1921.
- Feudal Germany, by James Westfall Thompson. 2 vols. Chicago, The University of Chicago press, 1928; Reprint, New York: F. Ungar Pub., 1962.
- Economic and social history of the Middle Ages (300–1300), by James Westfall Thompson. New York, London, The Century Co., c1928.
- The Middle Ages, 300–1500, by James Westfall Thompson. 2 vols. New York, A. A. Knopf, 1931; 2d ed. New York: Cooper Square Publishers, 1972.
- The living past; politics-society-trade-art. Chicago: Thomas S. Rockwell Company, 1931.
- Byways in bookland, by James Westfall Thompson. Berkeley: The Book arts clubof the University of California, 1935.
- The dissolution of the Carolingian fisc in the ninth century, by James Westfall Thompson. Berkeley: University of California Press, 1935.
- Secret diplomacy; a record of espionage and double-dealing: 1500–1815, by J. W. Thompson & S.K. Padover; with 18 illustrations. London, Jarrolds, limited, 1937.
- The importance of libraries in the preservation of culture, by James Westfall Thompson. Baltimore: Enoch Pratt free library of Baltimore, 1937.
- An introduction to medieval Europe, 300–1500, by James Westfall Thompson ... & Edgar Nathaniel Johnson. New York: W. W. Norton & company, inc., c1937.
- European civilization; a political, social and cultural history, by James Westfall Thompson, Franklin Charles Palm, and John J. Van Nostrand. New York: D. Van Nostrand Company, inc., 1939.
- The literacy of the laity in the Middle Ages, by James Westfall Thompson. New York: Burt Franklin, 1960.
- A history of historical writing, by James Westfall Thompson with the collaboration of Bernard J. Holm. 2 vols. Gloucester, Mass.: P. Smith, 1967.
- The letters and documents of Armand de Gontaut, baron de Biron, marshal of France (1524–1592), collected by Sidney Hellman Ehrman, edited, with an introduction by James Westfall Thompson. 2 vols. New York: AMS Press, 1979.
- Medieval and historiographical essays in honor of James Westfall Thompson, edited by James Lea Cate and Eugene N. Anderson. Port Washington, N.Y.: Kennikat Press, 1966, c1938.
