= Oda of Meissen =

Saxon countess

Duchess consort of the Polans
- Tenure: 1018 – 17 June 1025

Queen consort of Poland
- Tenure: 18 April 1025 – 17 June 1025
- Born: c. 996
- Died: 31 October or 13 November aft. 1025
- Spouse: Bolesław I the Brave
- Issue: Matylda of Poland
- Dynasty: Ekkehardiner dynasty (by birth); Piast dynasty (by marriage)
- Father: Eckard I, Margrave of Meissen
- Mother: Swanehilde of Saxony

Oda of Meissen, also named Ode, Old High German form for Uta or Ute (Polish: Oda Miśnieńska, German: Oda von Meißen; born c. 996 – died 31 October or 13 November after 1025), was a Saxon countess and member of the Ekkehardiner dynasty. She married Piast Duke Bolesław I the Brave (who later became in the first King of Poland) as his fourth and last wife.

The Ekkehardiner dynasty were under Otto III, Holy Roman Emperor, amongst the most influential princes of the Holy Roman Empire. After Otto III's death, they tried to maintain their position as ruling Margraves of Meissen with his successor Henry II. To do this, they sought a close relationship with the neighboring Polish ruler Bolesław I the Brave, the most powerful friend and ally of the Holy Roman Empire. After the outbreak of the conflict between Henry II and Bolesław I from 1002, they only took part in the campaigns against the Polish ruler. When the Peace of Bautzen ended the conflict in 1018, Oda's marriage to Bolesław I served to consolidate the agreement.

== Life ==
=== Origin and family ===
Oda's exact year and place of birth are unknown. Being the youngest child of Eckard I, Margrave of Meissen by his wife Suanhilde (in turn daughter of Hermann Billung, Margrave of Saxony), Oda belonged to one of the most distinguished and influential families of Saxony. Not least because of this reputation, her father Eckard I ran in the 1002 German royal election against the later King Henry II. Her eldest brother Herman eventually succeeded his father in 1009 as Margrave of Meissen and was succeeded by his younger brother Eckard II in 1038. Oda's other two brothers held high ecclesiastical offices: Gunther was since 1024 Archbishop of Salzburg and Eilward from 1016 was Bishop of Meissen. Oda two sisters were Liutgard (wife of Margrave Werner, Margrave of the Nordmark) and Matilda (wife of Dietrich II, Margrave of Lower Lusatia).

The Ekkehardiner family already maintained close ties with the Piast dynasty before Oda's marriage. Eckard I's brother Gunzelin was some way closely related to Bolesław I (either uterine half-brother or brother-in-law). Eckard I's son Herman I married with Bolesław I's daughter Regelinda in 1002; after Oda married Bolesław I in 1018 she became the stepmother-in-law of her own brother.

=== Marriage with Bolesław I ===
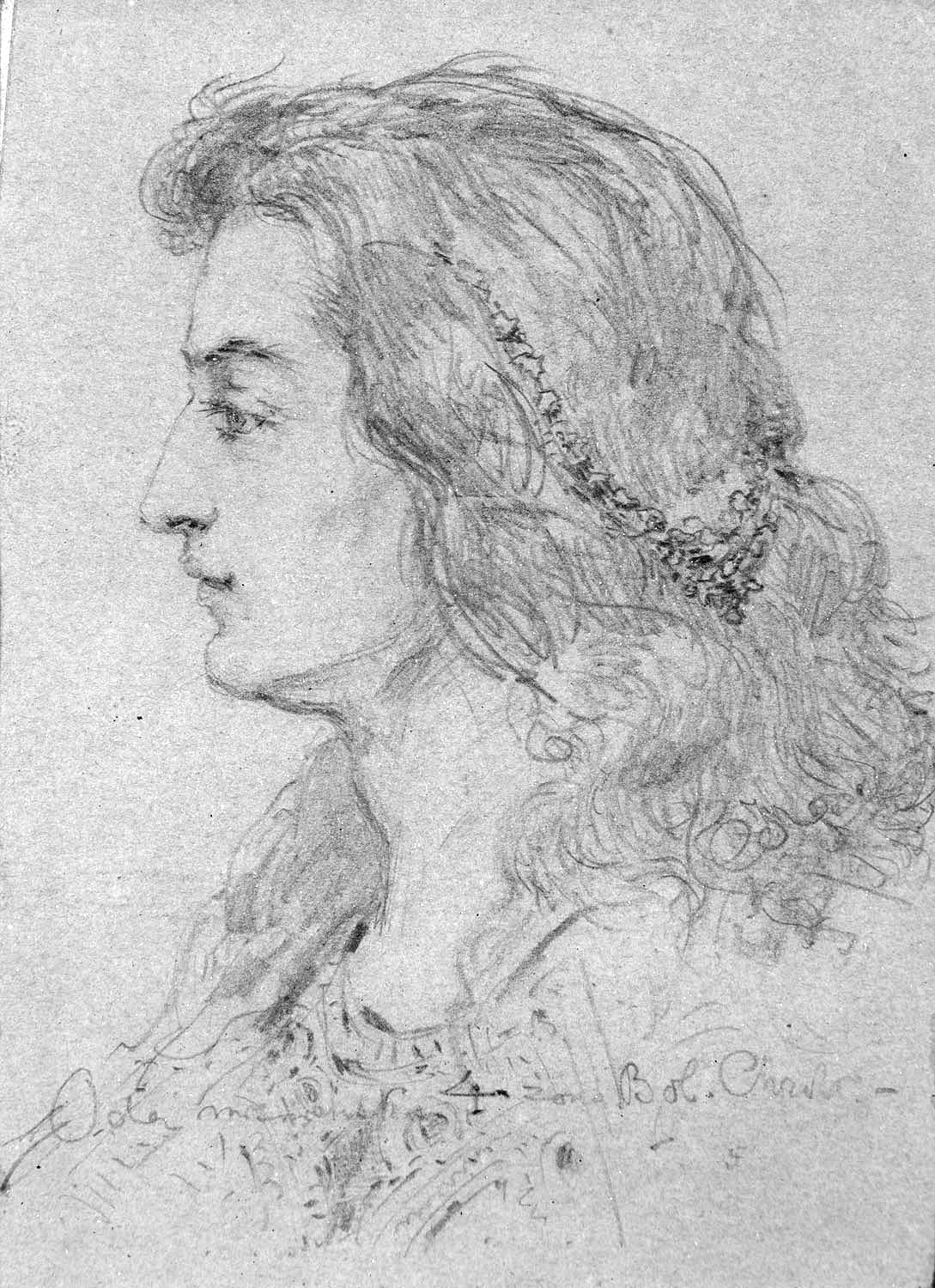
Sketch of Oda of Meissen by Jan Matejko

Since the death of his third wife Emnilda in 1017, Bolesław I began to look a suitable new consort, and he turned his attention to the Holy Roman Empire. On 30 January 1018 the Peace of Bautzen was signed between Emperor Henry II and the Polish ruler; during the preliminary negotiations of this treaty in Ortenburg Castle, was decided that the widower Bolesław I would reinforced his dynastic bonds with the German nobility through a marriage. The chosen bride was the much younger Oda, whose eldest brother Margrave Herman I of Meissen gave his consent as the head of the Ekkehardiner family. Accompanied by her brother and Bolesław I's son Otto, Oda traveled to Cziczani (also spelled Sciciani, at the site of either modern Groß-Seitschen or Zinnitz or Zützen) Castle, the residence of the Piasts in Lower Lusatia. There, she was received with a sea of lights when she arrived at night by Bolesław I and a large crowd. The marriage is believed to be celebrated in simple secular rite followed (at best with a subordinate ecclesiastical contribution, especially since the church only began to be interested in the institute of marriage at this point in time) four days later after the formal signing of the peace treaty, on 3 February 1018 or a few days later.

In his chronicle, written between 1012 and 1018, Thietmar of Merseburg provides the only contemporary report of the wedding celebrations. According to his comments, he criticizes the marriage and paints a gloomy picture of Oda's future: he says that "from now she has lived outside the law of matrimony and thus in a manner unworthy for a noble lady like her", because the wedding was celebrated into against the rules of the Church and without its consent during Lent. The following remarks by Thietmar seem to confirm his prediction. In connection with the victory over Yaroslav the Wise, Grand Prince of Kiev, he describes Bolesław I as an "old bastard" (antiquus fornicator), who made Yaroslav's captive sister, Predslava, his concubine, regardless of his wife and against any law. It is doubtful whether conclusions can be drawn about the marriage with Oda from this. According to the Polish historian Andrzej Pleszczyński, Bolesław I's behavior cannot be measured against today's moral standards. In doing so, he had fulfilled archaic expectations of a victorious ruler, which at that time were much more deeply rooted in his domains than Christian values.

According to older interpretations of Thietmar's Chronicle, his criticism is also directed against Oda. The phrase sine matronali consuetudine whom he wrote about her, should be translated as "without virginity". Oda thus led a dissolute way of life prior to her wedding and not as it would have been worthy of such a respected marriage. German historian Robert Holtzmann comments on Thietmar's reports, which he also understands, as a kind of "bitter irony".

In addition to the significance for Oda's personal fate, the marriage of Bolesław I had a political dimension. The union was concluded as a part of the Peace of Bautzen signed between Emperor Henry II and the Polish. With this treaty, their almost two decades-long disputes about rank, honor and reputation, but also about territorial claims over the March of Lusatia, the Milceni land and the adjacent Sorbian Meissen finished. On Henry II's campaigns against Bolesław I, Oda's family was part of a "Polish-friendly alliance party", alongside the powerful Billunger dynasty, who only hesitantly involved. The marriage renewed the traditional friendship between Piast and Ekkehardiner dynasties after the daughter of Bolesław I, Regelinda, who was married with Oda's brother Margrave Herman I of Meissen, died in 1016. In addition, Bolesław I's prestigious marriage with Oda, a high-ranked noble German lady, restored his honor and was an expression of his victory. In the Peace of Bautzen, Bolesław I was as the clear winner, as he was able to maintain his sovereignty over the March of Lusatia and the Milceni land, to which he was entitled because of his third marriage to Emnilda, a daughter of the Lusatian prince Dobromir, just as claimed as the Ekkehardiner family. And finally, there are no more attacks by Bolesław I on the neighboring Margraviate of Meissen, ruled by Oda's brother Herman I.

=== Later life ===
Oda and Bolesław I's marriage only produced one known child, a daughter, Matylda (died c. 1036) —named after her maternal aunt the Margravine of Lower Lusatia—who was betrothed on 18 May 1035 with Otto of Schweinfurt, Margrave of the Nordgau; however, the marriage never took place because the betrothal contract was broken by the Council of Tribur in 1036, presumably on the grounds of consanguinity. Nothing is known about Oda's further life. Considerations that she returned to the ancestral seat of the Ekkehardiner dynasty in Naumburg with her daughter in the turmoil after Bolesław I's death on 17 June 1025, can not be substantiated by contemporary written sources. The year of her death is also not recorded. In the necrology of the Church of St. Michaelis, Lüneburg, entries for a Ode com, i.e. a Countess Oda (Ode comitessa), are recorded on 31 October and 13 November. German Historian Gerd Althoff came to the conclusion that one of the two is dedicated to Oda's memory, because Bolesław I and many members of the Ekkehardiner dynasty were also included in the necrology.

== Reception ==
In the German-speaking area, Oda of Meissen has not received much attention. Historical accounts mention her at best as a very marginal figure in connection with the Peace of Bautzen, as the wife of Bolesław I or as a member of the Ekkehardiner dynasty. An exception to this is a consideration by German historian Ferdinand Wachter in the first half of the 19th century, according to which among the painted statue donators of Naumburg Cathedral made in the 13th century could not represent Eckard II's wife Uta von Ballenstedt, but his sister Oda of Meissen. In particular, the crown of the sandstone figure, which is only inscribed with the name "Uta", was also recently challenged by the art historian Michael Imhof, who had doubts about an identification of the founder figure as Uta of Ballenstedt, although he suspected that instead of Oda of Meissen was her sister-in-law and stepdaughter Regelinda of Poland the one portrayed there. In the opinion of Kerstin Merkel, the person portrayed must have been perceived by contemporaries as a godless woman, because she wore her coat like a man.

Polish historians considered Oda of Meissen to be the first Queen consort of Poland until the 19th century. The reason for this assumption was a note by the Polish historiographer Jan Długosz in his 15th century Annales seu cronicae incliti Regni Poloniae (Annals or Chronicles of the Famous Kingdom of Poland). In it he reports in accordance with contemporary Saxon annals, Bolesław I was crowned King on 18 April 1025 after the death of his adversary Henry II. In addition, Długosz indicates, however, that together with Bolesław I an unnamed Queen was crowned, in whom subsequent generations suspected was Oda of Meissen. In the meantime, however, the equation of the nameless crowned queen with Oda of Meissen is just as baseless as the underlying note by Jan Długosz. The scientific examination of the works of Jan Długosz has shown that he often supplemented the sources used by him with events that, in his opinion, must have taken place.

== Bibliography ==
- Jasiński, Kazimierz (2004). Rodowód pierwszych Piastów. (= Poznańskie Towarzystwo Przyjaciół Nauk. Wznowienia (in Portuguese). Vol. 19. Poznań. ISBN 83-7063-409-5.
- Ludat, Herbert (1971). An Elbe und Oder um das Jahr 1000. Skizzen zur Politik des Ottonenreiches und der slavischen Mächte in Mitteleuropa (in German). Böhlau, Köln and others. ISBN 3-412-07271-0.
- Pleszczyński, Andrzej (2011). The Birth of a Stereotype. Polish Rulers and their Country in German Writings c. 1000 A.D. (= East Central and Eastern Europe in the Middle Ages, 450–1450. vol 15). Leiden and others: Brill. ISBN 978-90-04-18554-8.
- Reuter, Timothy (1991). Germany in the early Middle Ages, 800-1056. Routledge; 1st edition. ISBN 978-0-582-49034-5.
- Rupp, Gabriele (1996). Die Ekkehardiner, Markgrafen von Meissen und ihre Beziehung zum Reich und zu den Piasten (in German). Lang, Frankfurt am Main and others. ISBN 3-631-49868-3.

Oda of Meissen Ekkehardiner dynasty Born: ca. 996 Died: aft. 1025
Royal titles
Preceded by Emnilda of Lusatia as duchess	Duchess consort of the Polans; Queen consort from 18 April 1025; 1018 – 17 June 1025	Succeeded by Richeza of Lotharingia as queen
