= Swanehilde of Saxony =

Margravine of Meissen

Swanehilde of Saxony (also Suanehild, Suanhild, Swanhild, Schwanhild or Billung, born between 945 and 955, died 26 November 1014) was Margravine of Meissen (r. 970-979 and before 1000–1014).

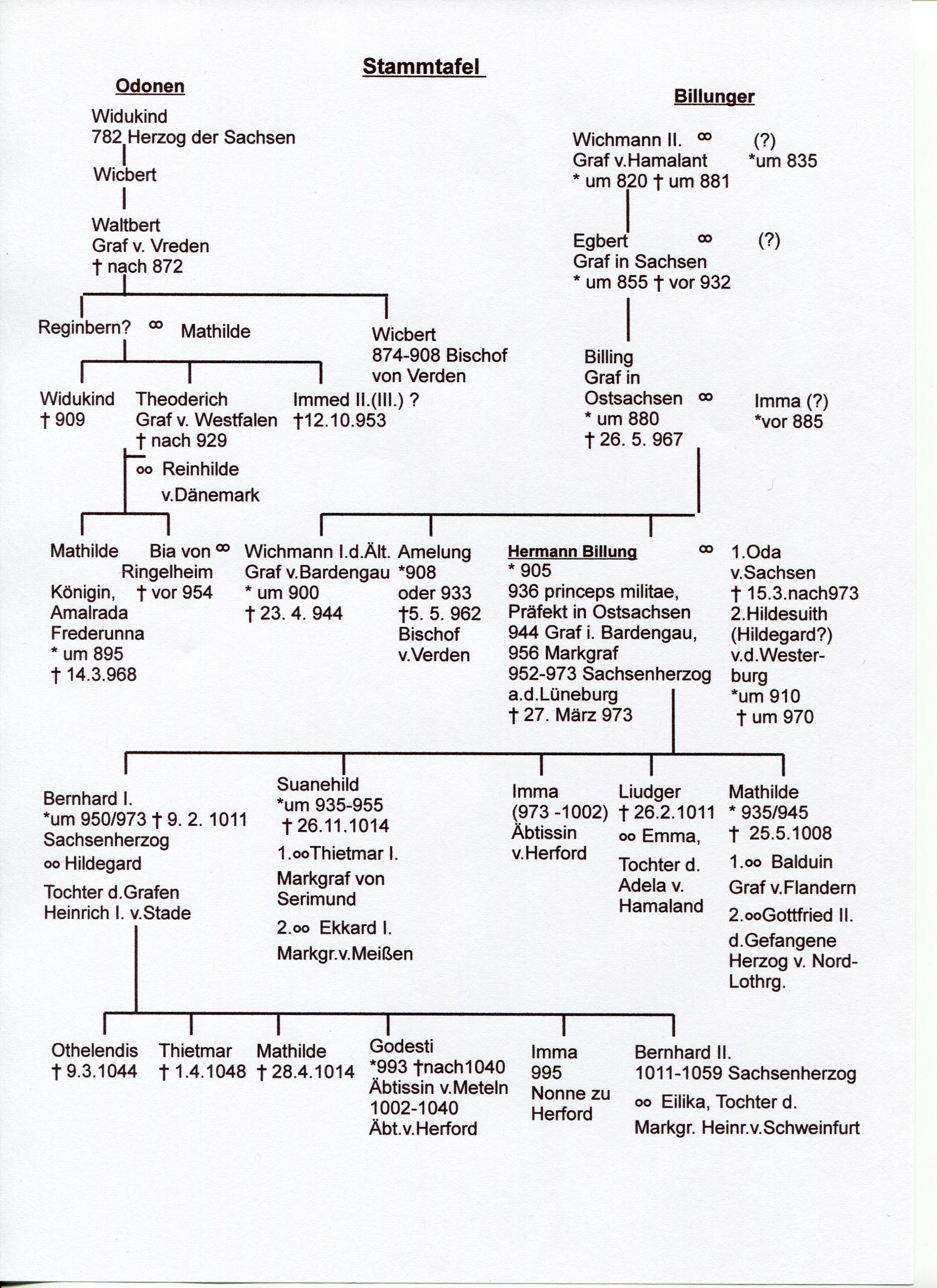
Family tree of Hermann Billung, including Swanhilde ('Suanhild') of Saxony

== Life ==
Swanehilde was born between 945 and 955 as a daughter of Herman, Duke of Saxony, Margrave of the Billung March and Oda.

In 970, she married Thietmar I (died 979) Margrave of Meissen. They had the following issue:

- Gero II (970/975 - 1015), Graf im Hassegau and Markgraf der Lausitz who died in battle against the Poles.

After Thietmar's death she remarried Ekkehard I who was murdered on 30 April 1002 in Pöhlde. They had seven children:

1. Liutgard (d. 1012), married Margrave Werner of the Northern March
2. Herman I, Margrave of Meissen (d. 1038), married Regelinda, daughter of King Bolesław I Chrobry of Poland
3. Eckard II, Margrave of Meissen (d. 24 January 1046), married Uta, sister of Count Esico of Ballenstedt
4. Gunther (d. 1025), Archbishop of Salzburg
5. Eilward (d. 1023), Bishop of Meissen
6. Matilda, married Dietrich II, Margrave of Lower Lusatia
7. Oda (d. after 1018), married King Bolesław I Chrobry of Poland.

Swanehilde died on 26 November 1014. She was buried in the monastery of Jena and reburied after 1028 in the Church of St. George in Naumburg.
