= Regelinda =

989-1014 medieval noble woman

- Margravine of Meissen
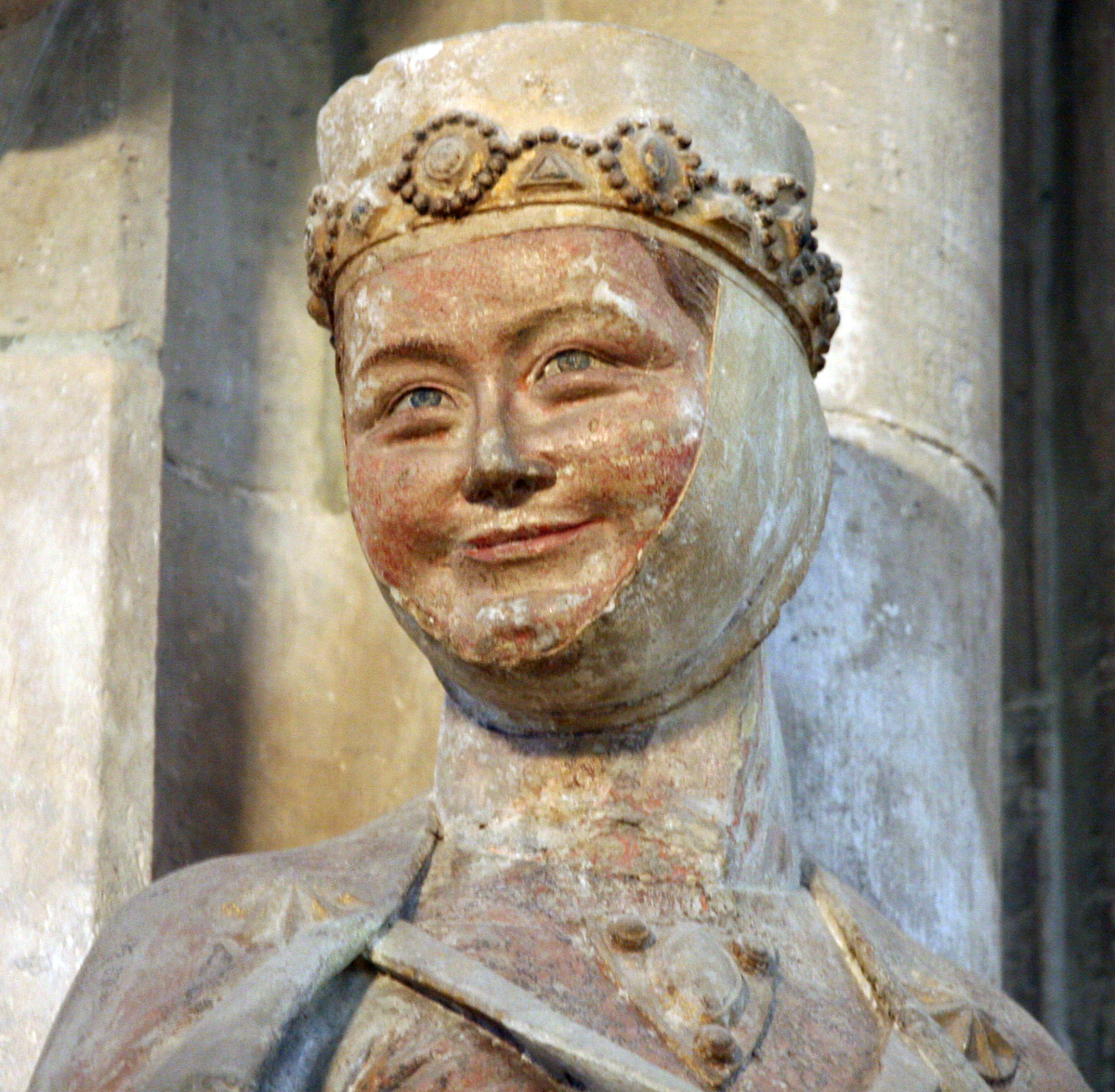
- The 13th-century Naumburg Cathedral statue depicting Regelinda
- Born: c. 989
- Died: 21 March 1014 or 1016
- Noble family: Piast
- Spouse: Herman I, Margrave of Meissen
- Father: Bolesław the Brave
- Mother: Emnilda

Regelinda (German: Reg(e)lindis; c. 989 - 21 March c. 1014/16), also known as the "Smiling Polish woman", was a Polish princess from the Piast dynasty and Margravine of Meissen from 1009 until her death by her marriage to Herman I.

== Life ==
She was the daughter of the Polish King Bolesław I the Brave from his third marriage with Emnilda, daughter of Dobromir, a Slavic prince (according to some modern historians in Lusatia).

Regelinda was married to Herman I shortly after his father Margrave Eckard I of Meissen was killed on April 30, 1002. While Duke Bolesław had occupied the March of Lusatia and the Milceni lands, the marriage brought the Polish Piasts and the Ekkardiner margraves closer. The new king Henry II of Meissen named Herman's uncle Gunzelin Eckard's successor, however, in 1009, deposed him and installed Herman as Margrave of Meissen with Regelinda as his margravine consort. The alliance with the Polish ruler was renewed after the 1018 Peace of Bautzen, when Bolesław married Herman's sister Oda.

The margravine is better known for the 13th century statue erected in Naumburg Cathedral by the Naumburg Master, which shows a "smiling Polish woman" (Polish: śmiejąca się Polka, German: Lächelnde Polin). It is part of a semicircle of twelve donor portraits in the west choir, among them Herman's brother Margrave Eckard II and his wife Uta, although there is some research which questions her identification.

Her exact year of death is unknown. She died in around 1014 or 1016, but it is also speculated that she could have lived until 1030.
