= Eckard I of Meissen =

Margrave of Meissen from 985 to 1002

Eckard I
- Margrave of Meissen
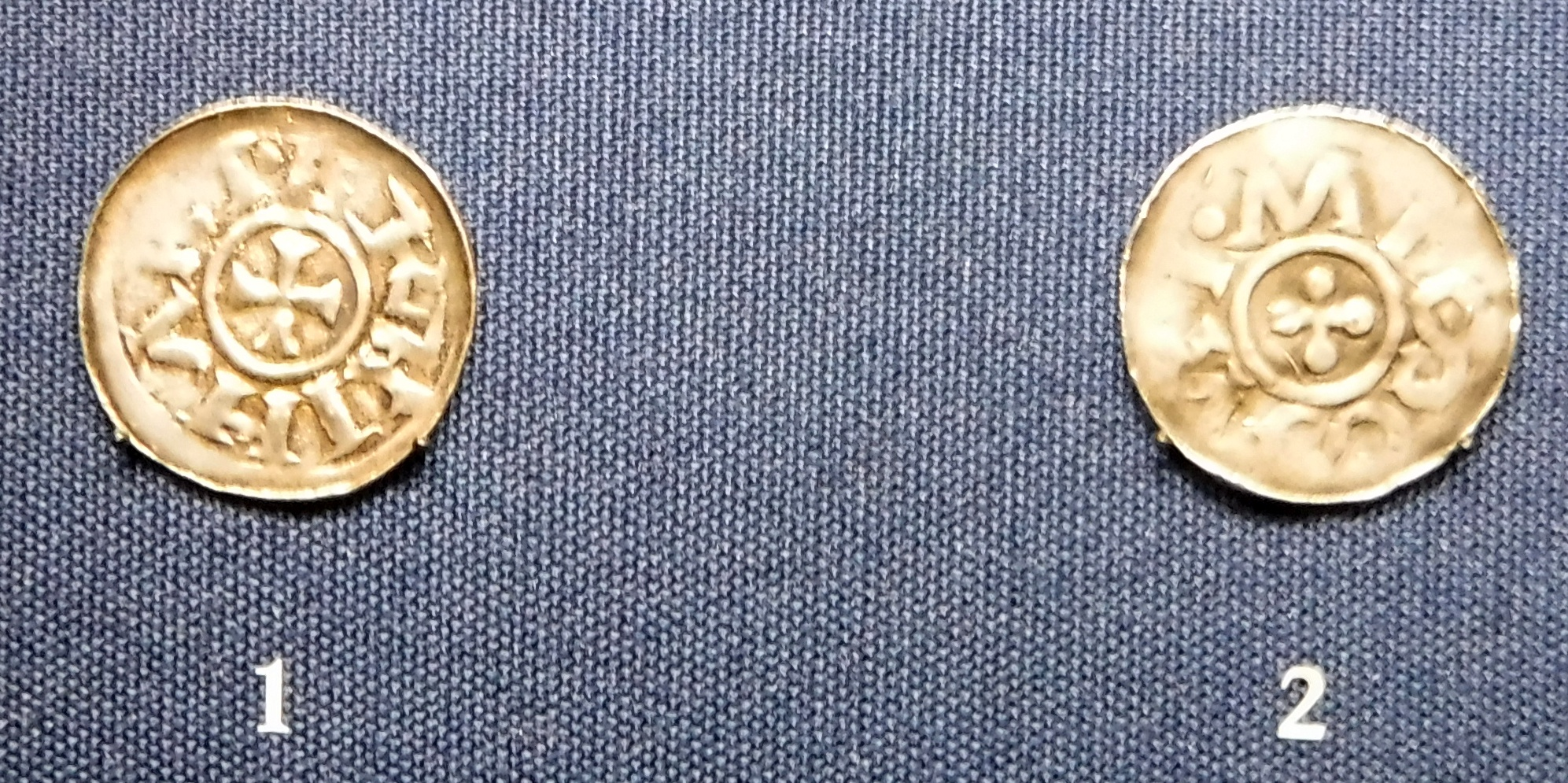
- Coins minted during the reign of Eckard I
- Reign: 985–1002
- Born: c. 960
- Died: 30 April 1002; Pöhlde Abbey
- Buried: Gerbstedt Abbey
- Noble family: Ekkehardiner
- Spouse: Schwanehilde (Suanhild)
- Father: Gunther of Merseburg

Eckard I (Ekkehard; (Note: Rarely Ekkard or Eckhard. Contemporary Latin variants to his name include Ekkihardus, Eggihardus, Eggihartus, Heckihardus, Egihhartus, and Ekgihardus.) c. 960 – 30 April 1002) was Margrave of Meissen from 985 until his death. He was the first margrave of the Ekkehardinger family that ruled over Meissen until the extinction of the line in 1046.

Eckard was one of the candidates for the German throne in the 1002 German royal election. Eckard was at that time the most obvious Saxon candidate, but the nobles were opposed to him. (Note: Thietmar of Merseburg records how one Saxon had taunted Eckard, saying, "Can't you see that your cart is missing its fourth wheel?" which may refer to either Eckard's seeming lack of hereditary right, although he was related distantly to the Ottonians, or to his apparent lack of self-control.) Eckard received enough support to commandeer the closing banquet of the Werla assembly and dine in state with Duke Bernard I of Saxony and Bishop Arnulf of Halberstadt. He was subsequently honoured as royalty by Bishop Bernward when he arrived at Hildesheim. Within days, however, Eckard was assassinated by agents of his Saxon opposition in Pöhlde.

== Life ==
Eckard was of noble east Thuringian stock, the eldest son of Margrave Gunther of Merseburg (d. 982). He followed his father into exile from 976 to 979 and took part in the 982 Battle of Stilo against the Emirate of Sicily, where Gunther was killed. Back in Germany, Eckard upon the death of Emperor Otto II in 983 supported his minor son King Otto III of Germany. At the Hoftag diet of Rohr in June 984, he together with Archbishop Willigis of Mainz and several German princes enforced the release of the four-year-old king by his rivaling cousin Duke Henry II of Bavaria.

In 985 Otto III appointed him to succeed Margrave Rikdag in Meissen, following severe Saxon setbacks against the Slavic Lutici tribes during the Great Slav Rising. Eckard remained a vital support for the king and his mother Empress Theophanu. His military responsibilities consisted primarily of securing the Milceni lands as well as the containment of the neighbouring Polish and Bohemia duchies. Duke Boleslaus II of Bohemia had allied with Duke Henry and had taken the occasion to occupy the Albrechtsburg residence, he nevertheless had to withdraw by 987, after Eckard's forces had prevailed. According to the chronicles of Thietmar of Merseburg, he was later elected Duke of Thuringia by the magnates of the region, an event which has been taken as evidence of the principle of tribal ducal election.

When Boleslaus II allied with the Lutici and entered into war with Mieszko I of Poland in 990, Margrave Eckard led the united German-Polish forces against Bohemia. Margrave Eckard had to restore Thiadric, Bishop of Prague to his see after his expulsion by Boleslaus II of Bohemia. In 996 he accompanied Otto III on his campaign to Rome, where the king was crowned Holy Roman Emperor by Pope Gregory V. Two years later, Eckard's forces helped to suppress the revolt of Crescentius the Younger in 998 by storming Castel Sant'Angelo. Eckard was high in the favour of Otto III, who rewarded him handsomely by converting many of his benefices (fiefs) into proprietas (allods).

When in January 1002 Otto III died without issue and the German princes met at Frohse (today part of Schönebeck) to elect a new king, Eckard even aimed at the German crown, because the late emperor's Ottonian relative Henry of Bavaria, son of rebellious Duke Henry II, who was the preeminent candidate, met with strong opposition. Eckard was at that time the most obvious Saxon candidate, but the nobles were opposed to him. (Note: Thietmar of Merseburg records how one Saxon had taunted Eckard, saying, "Can't you see that your cart is missing its fourth wheel?" which may refer to either Eckard's seeming lack of hereditary right, although he was related distantly to the Ottonians, or to his apparent lack of self-control.) They only agreed to meet again at the Kaiserpfalz of Werla and to support no candidate before then. The Werla meeting took place in April and Henry, through his cousins, Abbess Sophia I of Gandersheim and Adelheid I of Quedlinburg, the sisters of deceased Otto III, succeeded in having his election confirmed, at least in part by hereditary right. Nevertheless, Eckard received enough support to commandeer the closing banquet of the Werla assembly and dine in state with Duke Bernard I of Saxony and Bishop Arnulf of Halberstadt. He was subsequently honoured as royalty by Bishop Bernward when he arrived at Hildesheim. Within days, however, he had been assassinated by agents of his Saxon opposition in Pöhlde. Among these rivals were Count Henry III of Stade, his brother Udo, and Count Siegfried II of Northeim.

Eckard was initially buried at his family's castle in Kleinjena near Naumburg, but his remains were transferred to the Benedictine monastery of Saint George in Naumburg in 1028. He was remembered by Bishop Thietmar of Merseburg as decus regni, solatium patriae, comes suis, terror inimicis et per omnia perfectissimus. Meissen fell into dispute on his death. Duke Bolesław I Chrobry of the Polans, who had supported Eckard for the throne, laid claim to it as his relative by marriage. Henry, now king, allotted to Bolesław the March of Lusatia (which had been attached to Meissen), but Meissen itself was granted to Gunzelin, Eckard's younger brother.

== Marriage and children ==
Eckard left behind his wife Schwanehilde (Suanhild), daughter of Hermann Billung, regent of Saxony. She died on 26 November 1014, having given him seven children, though he was her second husband, she being the widow of Margrave Thietmar, Margrave of Meissen:

1. Liutgard (d. 1012), married Margrave Werner of the Northern March
2. Herman I, Margrave of Meissen (d. 1038), married Regelinda, daughter of King Bolesław I Chrobry of Poland
3. Eckard II, Margrave of Meissen (d. 24 January 1046), married Uta, sister of Count Esico of Ballenstedt
4. Gunther (d. 1025), Archbishop of Salzburg
5. Eilward (d. 1023), Bishop of Meissen
6. Matilda, married Dietrich II, Margrave of Lower Lusatia
7. Oda (d. after 1018), married King Bolesław I Chrobry of Poland

== Sources ==
- Bernhardt, John W. (1993). Itinerant Kingship and Royal Monasteries in Early Medieval Germany, c. 936–1075. Cambridge: Cambridge University Press. ISBN 9780521394895.
- Pleszczynski, Andrzej (2011). The Birth of a Stereotype: Polish Rulers and Their Country in German Writings c. 1000 A.D. Brill.123
- Reuter, Timothy (1991). Germany in the Early Middle Ages 800–1056 (3rd ed.). New York, NY: Longman. ISBN 9780582081567.
- Thompson, James Westfall (1928). Feudal Germany, Volume II. New York, NY: Frederick Ungar Publishing Co.
- Warner, David, ed. (2001). Ottonian Germany: The Chronicon of Thietmar of Merseburg. Manchester University Press.
- Sarah Greer. 2018. The Disastrous Feast at Werla: Political Relationships and Insult in the Succession Contest of 1002. German History.

Preceded by Rikdag	Margrave of Meissen; 985–1002	Succeeded by Gunzelin
