= Naumburg Master =

Name given to an anonymous medieval sculptor

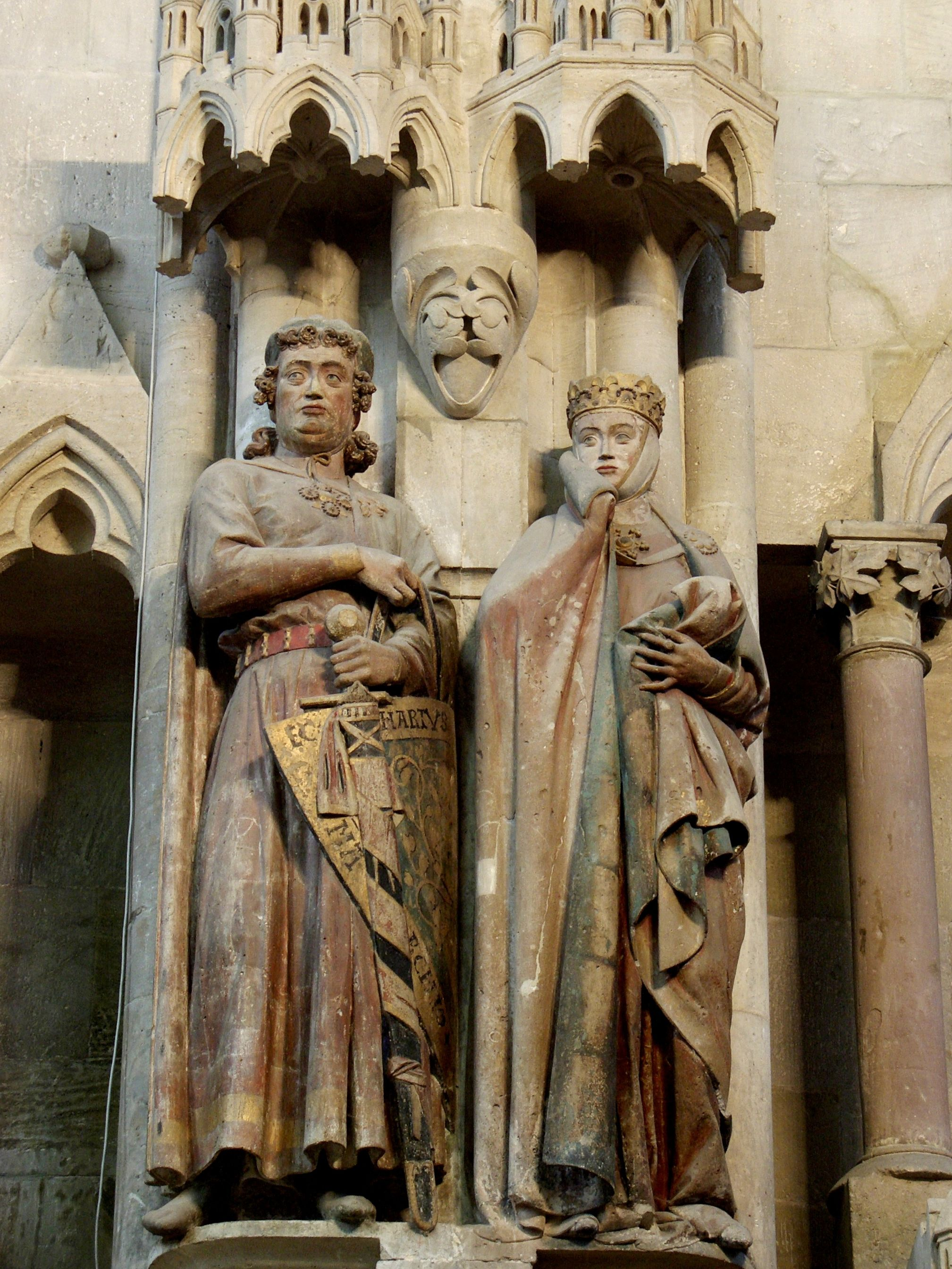
Statues by the Master: Margrave Eckard II and Uta, Naumburg Cathedral

The Naumburg Master (a notname; German: Naumburger Meister or Meister von Naumburg) was an anonymous medieval stone sculptor. Their works date to the middle of the 13th century, were executed over a career of more than thirty years, and are counted among the most important artworks of the European Middle Ages.

The Naumburg Master very likely learned their craft in northern France in the heyday of the High Gothic style. They were active in the towns of Noyon, Amiens, and Reims around 1225, and later possibly came to Metz in the Holy Roman Empire. Around 1230 they worked on Mainz Cathedral, where they created the fragmentary rood screen, including a sandstone relief of Saint Martin that became known as the Bassenheim Horseman.

Afterwards they traveled east along the Via Regia to the episcopal see of Naumburg, where the rebuilding of Naumburg Cathedral had started around 1210 and the Gothic west choir was added from about 1245–1250. Construction was likely finished by 1257, including the twelve monumental donor portraits that are considered their masterpieces, and it is from thence that their notname derives. Made of Grillenburg Sandstone, some of the sculptures are identified by name while others could not be assigned with certainty. The portraits of the main benefactors Margrave Eckard II of Meissen and his consort Uta von Ballenstedt as well as Margrave Herman I and his spouse Regelinda stand on both sides of the choir entrance.

Considering their characteristic style, the Naumburg Master is also identified as the creator of the founder figures in Meissen Cathedral and of the tomb slab of one knight Hermann von Hagen, the relative of a Naumburg canon, in Merseburg Cathedral. Their art shaped the work of numerous masons all over Central Germany. They were thus a decisive conveyor and pioneer of the ground-breaking innovations in architecture and sculpture of the late Hohenstaufen period in the 13th century.
