= Dietrich II of Lower Lusatia =

Margrave of Lusatia

Dietrich II
- Margrave of Lusatia
- Born: c. 970
- Died: 19 November 1034
- Noble family: Wettin
- Spouse: Mathilda of Meissen
- Issue: Thimo the Brave, Count of Wettin
- Father: Dedo I, Count of Wettin
- Mother: Thietburga of Haldensleben

Dietrich II, Margrave of Lower Lusatia (also known as Theodoric II; c. 989 – 19 November 1034) was the first Margrave of Lower Lusatia from the House of Wettin, ruling from 1032 until his death.

== Life ==
Dietrich was the only son of Count Dedo I, Count of Wettin and his wife Thietburga, a daughter of Count Dietrich of Haldensleben, the first margrave of the Northern March. Dietrich II thereby was a grandson of the Wettin progenitor Theodoric I.

At Christmas 1009, after his father was killed in a fierce struggle with Margrave Werner of the Northern March, Dietrich was vested with the County of Wettin in the Saxon Hassegau by King Henry II of Germany at Pöhlde. From 1015, he also appeared as a and count in the neighbouring Schwabengau. Upon the death of his uncle Frederick I, who had died without male issue in 1017, Dietrich inherited Eilenburg and Brehna. In 1018, Dietrich II and his brother-in-law, Margrave Herman I of Meissen acted as witnesses when the Peace of Bautzen was concluded between Emperor Henry II and the Polish ruler Bolesław I the Brave, ending a lengthy German–Polish War.

From 1029, Emperor Conrad II again waged war against Poland. Bolesław's son and successor Mieszko II lost Lusatia and finally had to renounce his claims in the 1033 Treaty of Merseburg. According to the Annalista Saxo chronicles, Dietrich played a key role in the emperor's campaign and in turn could succeed the Lusatian margrave Odo II in 1032. However, Dietrich earned the hatred of his brother-in-law Eckard II of Meissen and was killed by his henchmen, whereby Eckard became his successor in Lusatia.

Dietrich II's possessions were divided among his sons. As Count of Eilenburg, he was succeeded by his eldest son Dedi, who also became Margrave of Lusatia upon the death of Margrave Eckard II of Meissen in 1046.

== Marriage and issue ==
Dietrich married Mathilda, daughter of Margrave Eckard I of Meissen. They had seven children:

- Dedi (c. 1004–1075), the eldest son, who succeeded his father as Margrave of Lusatia
- Frederick (c. 1020–1084), elected Bishop of Münster in 1063
- Thimo (c. 1034 – c. 1101), Count of Wettin
- Gero (c. 1020–1089), Count of Brehna
- Konrad (d. 1040), Count of Camburg
- Rikdag
- Ida (also called Hidda), married Duke Spytihněv II of Bohemia

== Sources ==
- Loud, Graham A.; Schenk, Jochen, eds. (2017). The Origins of the German Principalities, 1100-1350: Essays by German Historians. Routledge.
- Thieme, André (2017). "The Rise of the Wettins". In Loud, Graham A.; Schenk, Jochen (eds.). The Origins of the German Principalities, 1100-1350: Essays by German Historians. Routledge.

Dietrich II of Lower Lusatia House of Wettin Born: c. 990 Died: 19 November 1034
Preceded by Odo II	Margrave of Lusatia; 1032–1034	Succeeded by Eckard II
