= Gunzelin, Margrave of Meissen =

Gunzelin of Kuckenburg (c. 965 – after 1017) was Margrave of Meissen from 1002 until 1009.

He was the second son of Margrave Gunther of Merseburg (c. 949 – 982), thereby the younger brother of Margrave Eckard I of Meissen.

His mother is speculated to be Doubravka of Bohemia, Duchess consort of Poland, as Gunzelin is called 'brother' [frater] to her son Bolesław I the Brave by chronicler Thietmar of Merseburg. This interpretation was disputed by Oswald Balzer and led to view that Bolesław was his brother-in-law; however, Michael Morys-Twarowski argues that Thietmar was using frater to describe only biological brother and the word used by him to refer someone's brother-in-law was gener.

Gunzelin held allods around Kuckenburg Castle (in present-day Obhausen) near Querfurt.

After the death of his father at the 982 Battle of Stilo, his elder brother was enfeoffed with the Margraviate of Meissen by King Otto III. In 1002, following Eckard's failed attempt at the throne in the German royal election and his subsequent assassination, Bolesław occupied Meissen, but the new king, Henry II forced him to leave it and accept the March of Lusatia with the adjacent Milceni lands instead. Lusatia was thus detached from Meissen, which was bestowed on Gunzelin at Bolesław' demand.

In Autumn 1004, Gunzelin took part in Henry's successful siege of Bautzen (Budusin), which had been occupied by the Poles in 1002. It is reported by Bishop Thietmar of Merseburg that the castle would have been razed if not for Gunzelin's insistence that the Poles be allowed to depart freely and the castle preserved. The retreating Poles, however, devastated parts of his march. Gunzelin thereafter resided in Budusin.

Gunzelin feuded with his nephews, Herman and Eckard II, in what was one of 11th-century Germany's ugliest civil wars. The feud concerned "the insult and humiliation entailed in taking and destroying a fortified residence." It also concerned the allegation that Gunzelin had sold captured Wends to the Jews as slaves. The slave trade in Slavs was a large issue in northeastern Germany at the time. Sometimes even fellow Germans were enslaved. Most slaves were the product of capture in war. The Church, however, largely opposed the slave trade: Thietmar railed against the "barbaric" practice the Saxons had shown of dividing up families in order to sell them.

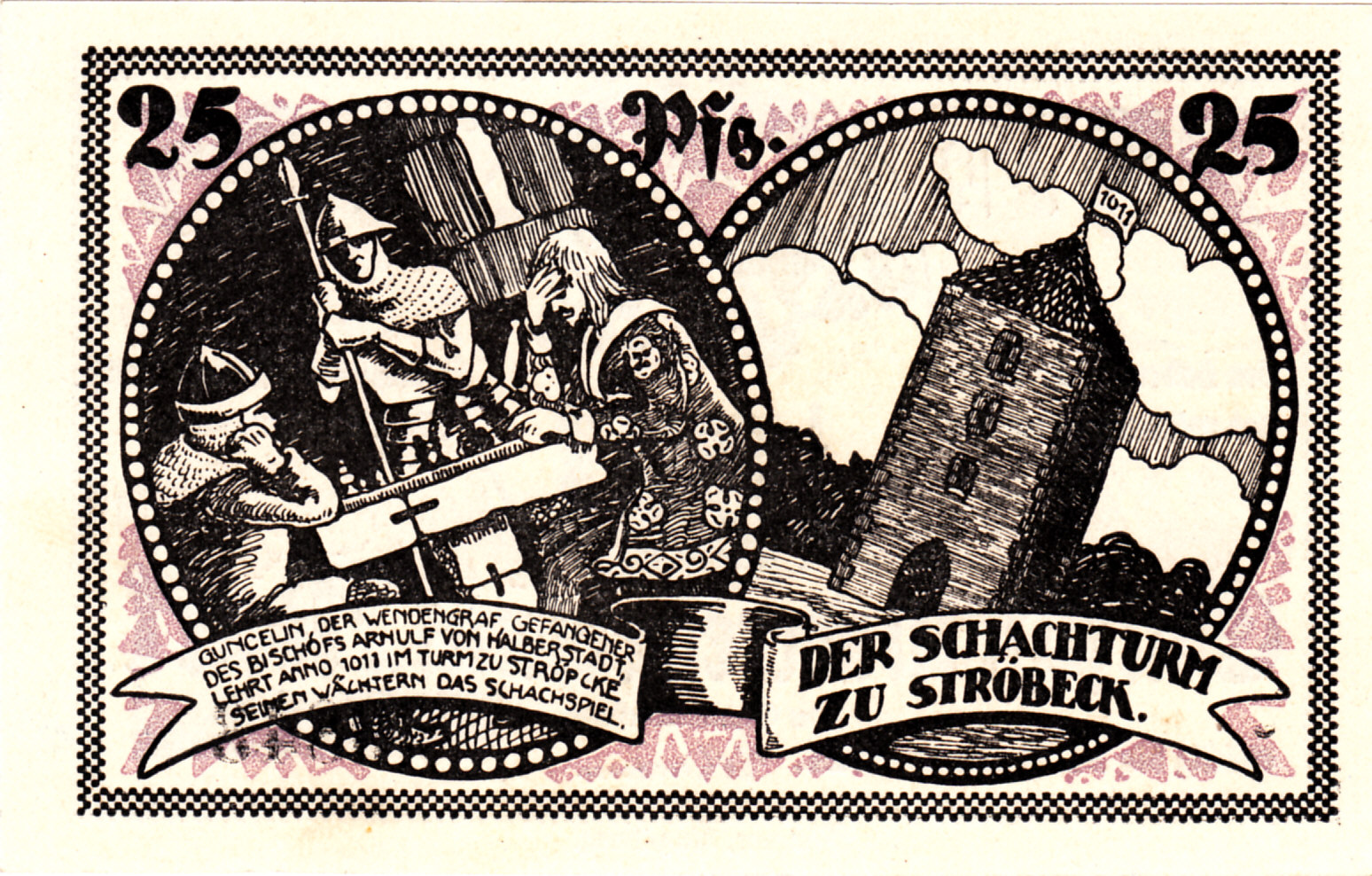
Gunzelin teaches his guards chess, 1921 Notgeld note

Gunzelin and Bolesław maintained friendly relations until 1009, when the former was deposed by King Henry on suspicion of an alliance with Bolesław against him. The margrave had travelled to Merseburg for a Fürstentag, where on June 5 he was arrested and handed over to the safekeeping of Bishop Arnulf of Halberstadt. His margraviate was bestowed on his nephew Herman; while Gunzelin himself was imprisoned for eight years in the farming village of Ströbeck near Drübeck Abbey in the Saxon Harzgau. According to legend, Gunzelin spent his imprisonment playing chess and teaching it to his guards. Other sources name Bamberg as his place of detention. Released in 1017, he died soon thereafter.

== Sources ==
- Reuter, Timothy. Germany in the Early Middle Ages 800–1056. New York: Longman, 1991.
- Thompson, James Westfall (1928). Feudal Germany, Volume II. New York: Frederick Ungar Publishing.
- "Gunzelin." Allgemeine Deutsche Biographie, by the Historischen Kommission of the Bayrischen Akademie der Wissenschaften, Band 10, Seite 181. (retrieved 5 June 2007, 20:49 UTC)

== Notes ==
Gunzelin, Margrave of Meissen Ekkeharding dynasty Born: c. 965 Died: after 1017
Preceded by Eckard I	Margrave of Meissen; 1002–1009	Succeeded by Herman I
