= Uta von Ballenstedt =

11th-century German noblewoman

- Margravine of Meissen
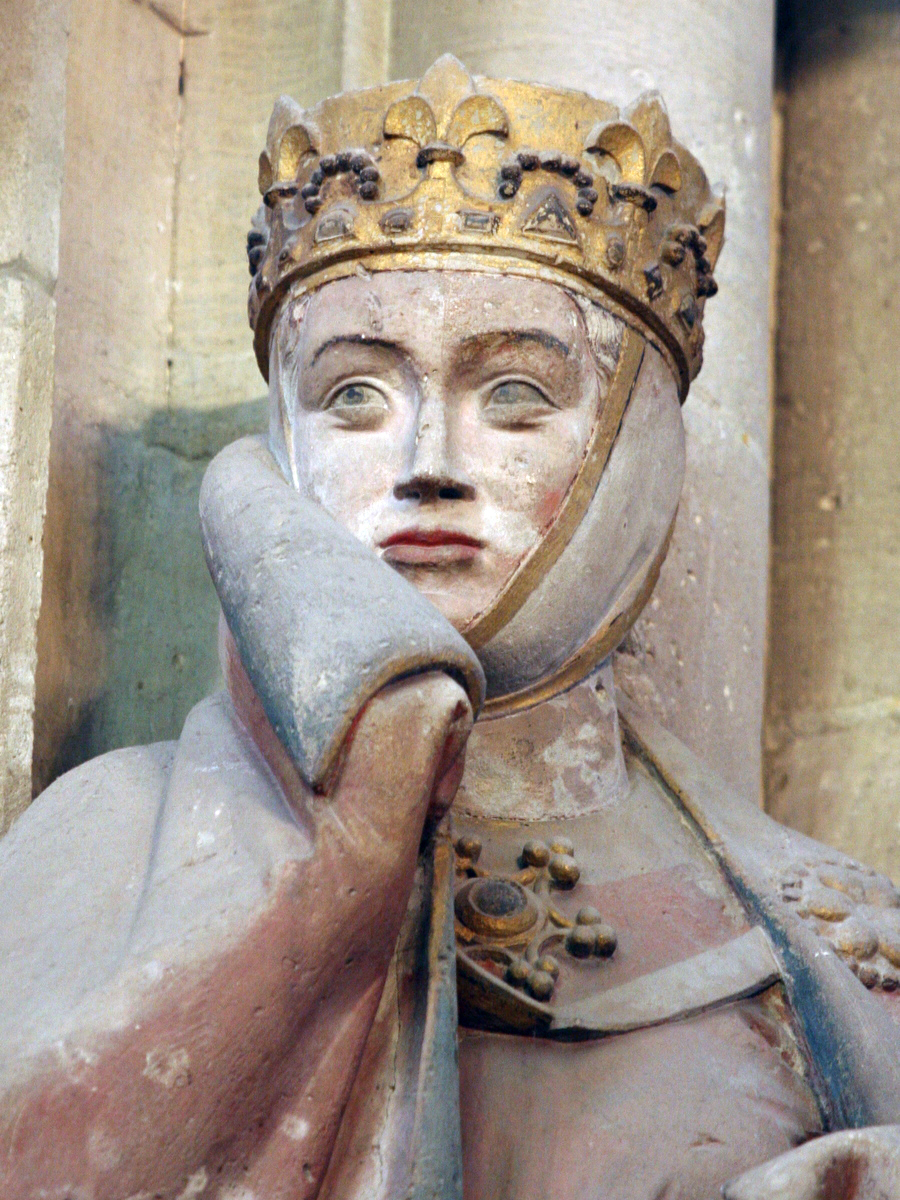
- Naumburg Cathedral portrait
- Born: c. 1000; Ballenstedt, Saxony
- Died: 23 October before 1046
- Noble family: House of Ascania
- Spouse: Eckard II, Margrave of Meissen
- Issue: Adelaide of Meissen
- Father: Adalbert I of Ballenstedt (?)
- Mother: Hidda (?)

Uta von Ballenstedt (c. 1000 — 23 October before 1046), a member of the House of Ascania, was Margravine of Meissen from 1038 until 1046, by marriage to Margrave Eckard II. She is also called Uta of Naumburg as the subject of a famous donor portrait by the Naumburg Master.

== Life ==
Little is known of Uta's descent. She was probably the sister of the Saxon count Esico of Ballenstedt, who became the progenitor of the Ascanian dynasty. One Count Adalbert of Ballenstedt and Hidda, a daughter of the Lusatian margrave Odo I (965-993), are commonly reckoned as their parents, however, these names are not recorded in contemporary sources.

According to 13th century Naumburg chronicles, Uta's father married her off to Eckard II in around 1026, the younger brother of Margrave Herman I of Meissen — presumably for political reasons, in order to further promote the rise of the Ascanian dynasty. Eckard, a loyal supporter of the Salian king Henry III, succeeded his brother-in-law Theoderic II as Margrave of Lusatia and in 1038 also assumed the rule in Meissen upon the death of his elder brother. However, his marriage with Uta remained without issue, resulting in the extinction of the Ekkeharding dynasty.

When Uta died, her husband donated large parts of her dowry to the convent of Gernrode in Uta's home country, where her sister Hazecha had been appointed abbess by King Henry III in 1044. The remaining estates fell to Empress Agnes of Poitou.

== Portrait ==
Uta was among the donors of Naumburg Cathedral, therefore a painted statue was erected in her honour in the 13th century. The Early Gothic west choir was built with an elevated gallery portraying the founders. The life-sized representation of a group of 12 people of the high nobility that were neither emperor nor king is unique in art history. Similar to the Bamberg Horseman, the individual depiction, part of a semicircle of twelve donor portraits, is today generally considered a masterpiece of Gothic art.

From the early 20th century onwards, the idealised picture of Uta with the distinctive collar upturned was published in numerous art history and travel guides, becoming an icon of the "genuine" German character and culture — often contrasted with the Naumburg statue of Margravine Regelinda as the stereotypical "smiling Polish woman". Her portrait was appropriated by the Nazi regime as a counter-image to so-called "degenerate art"; it appeared as an "Aryan" role model in Fritz Hippler's film The Eternal Jew and as a SS cult object in World War II propaganda.

The statue possibly inspired the character of the Evil Queen in Disney's 1937 animated film Snow White and the Seven Dwarfs. When Umberto Eco was asked with which women from European art he would most like to spend the evening, he replied: "In first place, ahead of all others, with Uta von Naumburg."
