= Eckard II of Meissen =

Margrave of Meissen and Lusatia

Eckard II
- Margrave of Meissen
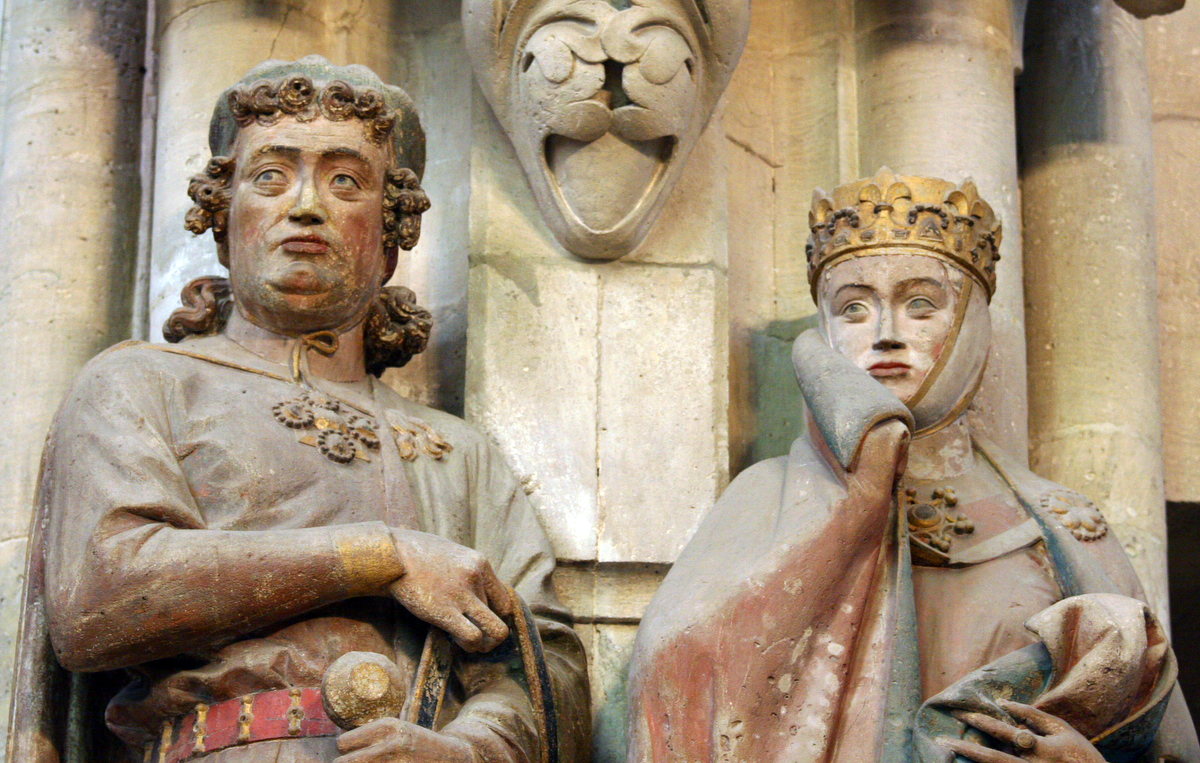
- Donor portraits of Eckard and his wife Uta, Naumburg Cathedral
- Born: c. 985
- Died: 24 January 1046
- Noble family: Ekkeharding dynasty
- Spouse: Uta von Ballenstedt
- Father: Eckard I, Margrave of Meissen
- Mother: Suanhild of Billung

Eckard II (German: Ekkehard; c. 985 – 24 January 1046) was Margrave of Lusatia (as Eckard I) from 1034 and Margrave of Meissen from 1038 until his death. He was the last of his dynasty, with his death the line of Ekkeharding margraves descending from Eckard I of Meissen (d. 1002) became extinct.

== Life ==
He was a younger son of Margrave Eckard I of Meissen and his wife Swanehilde. Eckard was a count in the Gau Chutizi east of Merseburg as well as in the burgward of Teuchern. Upon the assassination of his father in 1002, Eckard II and his elder brother Herman I ruled over the Ekkeharding allodial lands, while the Meissen margravial title first passed to their uncle Gunzelin feuding with his nephews until his deposition in 1009. During the German–Polish War around the Lusatian and Milceni lands, the brothers were able to maintain the rule over the Meissen lands until fighting ended with the 1018 Peace of Bautzen.

About 1026, Eckard married Uta von Ballenstedt, sister of the Saxon count Esico of Ballenstedt, progenitor of the noble House of Ascania. The marriage remained childless. With the consent of Emperor Conrad II, he and his brother Herman had the seat of the Bishopric of Zeitz relocated to Naumburg Cathedral in 1028–29.

In 1034 Eckard II became Margrave of Lusatia (Lower Lusatia) after his followers had slain the Wettin margrave Theoderic II, husband of Eckard's sister Matilda. Four years later he succeeded his brother Herman as Margrave of Meissen.

As guardian of the German eastern frontiers against Poland and Bohemia, he was often serving Emperor Conrad II and his successor King Henry III against these menaces, including the "Bohemian Achilles", Duke Bretislaus I. In 1039 Bretislaus, allied with King Peter of Hungary, who was at the same time raiding the Bavarian Avar March, made great gains in Poland, plundering Kraków and Gniezno, where he took along the relics of Saint Adalbert of Prague. In turn, King Henry III launched a campaign against him, together with his loyalest and most trusted allies, Archbishop Bardo of Mainz and Margrave Eckard. The Saxon forces led by the Meissen margrave took part in both of the king's expedition's, in 1040 and 1041: the first unsuccessful, the latter a victory which forced Duke Bretislaus to submit and conclude a peace treaty.

Margrave Eckard remained one of Henry's closest advisors until his death during a Saxon epidemic of 1046. He bequeathed his exceptional wealth and his margravial titles and lands to King Henry, who bestowed the margraviate on the Thuringian count William IV of Weimar.

He and his wife Uta von Ballenstedt were immortalized by their famous donor portraits by the Naumburg Master in the Naumburg Cathedral.

== Sources ==
- Gwatkin, H.M., Whitney, J. P. (ed) et al. The Cambridge Medieval History: Volume III. Cambridge University Press, 1926.

Eckard II of Meissen Ekkeharding dynasty Born: c. 985 Died: 24 January 1046
Preceded by Theodoric II	Margrave of Lusatia; 1034–1046	Succeeded by Dedi I
Preceded by Herman I	Margrave of Meissen; 1038–1046	Succeeded by William
