= Herman I of Meissen =

Herman I
- Margrave of Meissen
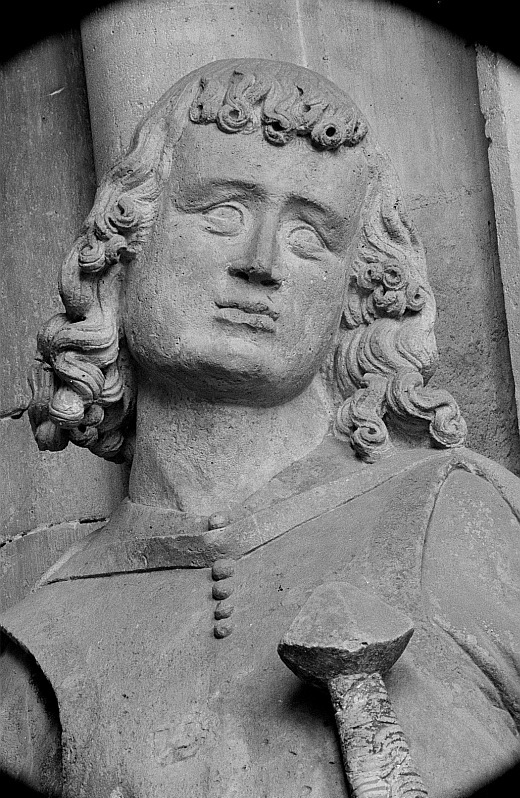
- Donor portrait at Naumburg Cathedral
- Born: c. 980
- Died: 1 November 1038
- Noble family: Ekkeharding
- Spouse: Regelinda
- Father: Eckard I, Margrave of Meissen
- Mother: Suanhild of Billung

Herman I (German: Hermann; c. 980 – 1 November 1038) was Margrave of Meissen from 1009 until his death.

== Life ==
He was the eldest son of Margrave Eckard I of Meissen and his wife Swanehilde, a daughter of Margrave Hermann Billung. On 30 April 1002 his father was murdered at the Kaiserpfalz of Pöhlde, after he had raised claims to the German throne in the royal election. The new king Henry II passed the Margraviate of Meissen to Herman's uncle Gunzelin, while he and his brother had to retire to their allods.

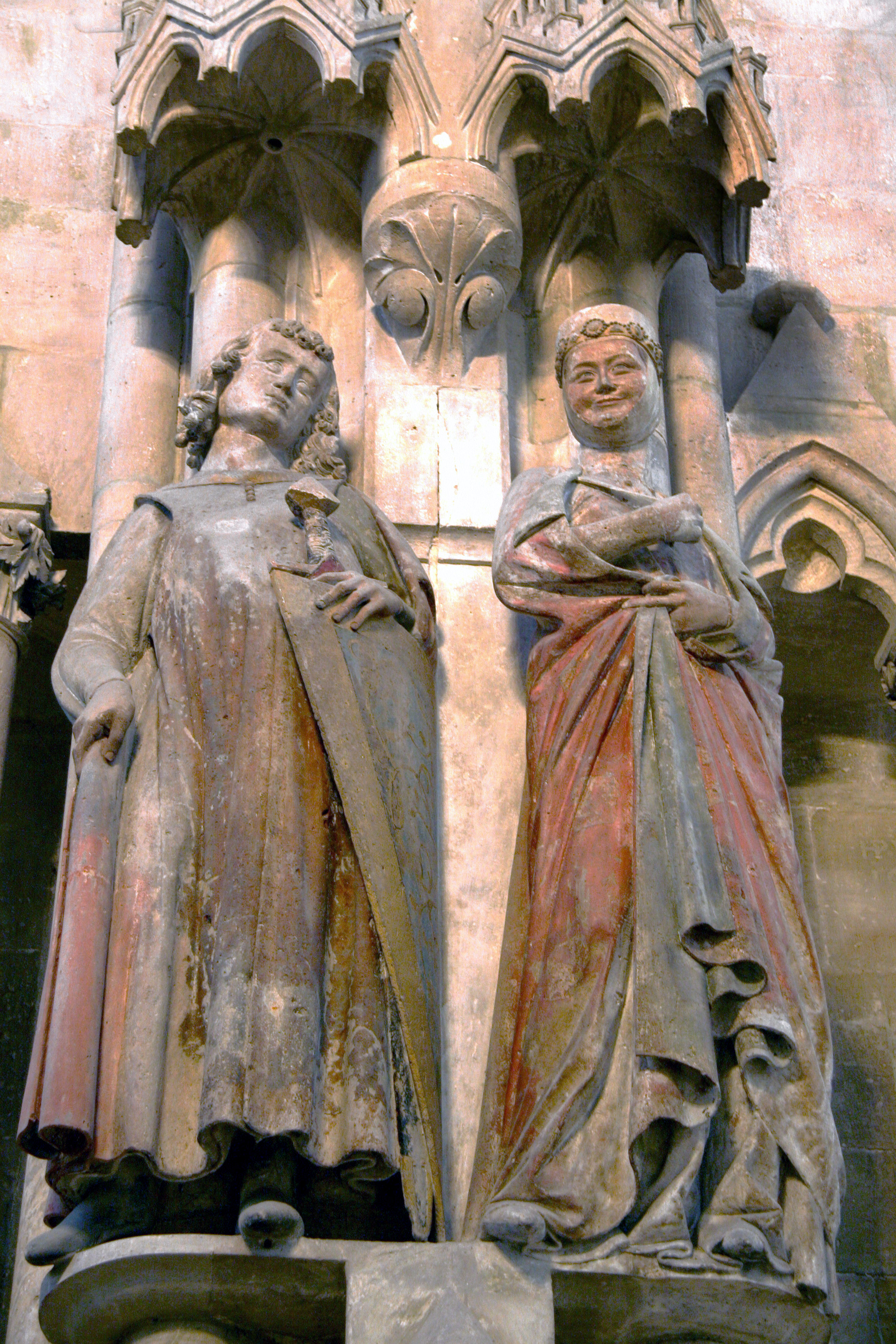
Herman and Reglinda

In the summer of 1002, Herman married Regelinda, a daughter of the Polish king Bolesław I the Brave. While Bolesław, who had supported the candidacy of Margrave Eckard I, occupied the eastern March of Lusatia and the adjacent Milceni lands (later Upper Lusatia) in the south, the matrimonial alliance with the Polish Piast dynasty added to Herman's gain in power. During the ongoing German–Polish War in 1007, he was created count of Bautzen (Budusin). He and his younger brother Eckard II feuded with their uncle Gunzelin in what was one of 11th-century Germany's ugliest civil wars. The feud concerned "the insult and humiliation entailed in taking and destroying a fortified residence."

The tide turned when Margrave Gunzelin began to deal with the Polish forces and at the instigation of King Henry II was deposed and arrested at a princely council in Merseburg in August 1009. His nephew Herman was selected to replace him; he was on better terms with the king than Gunzelin was, though even his brother, Eckard II, was too friendly towards the Poles for Henry's liking (1013). Herman himself did not participate in the 1015 campaign of King Henry against Bolesław, whereby his stepbrother, the Lusatian margrave Gero II was killed. In 1018, he witnessed the conclusion of the Peace of Bautzen.

Margrave Herman became a loyal supporter of King Henry's Salian successor Conrad II. In 1029, he was appointed count in the Saxon Hassegau and the adjacent Gau Chutizi in the March of Merseburg. He sent his forces against the Polish king Mieszko II Lambert to reconquer the Polish-occupied territories, sealed by the 1033 Treaty of Merseburg. Herman also fought against the Thuringian count William III of Weimar, and quarrelled with Bishop Thietmar of Merseburg. In his later years, he left the rule to his younger brother Eckard II, who succeeded Herman upon his death in 1038.

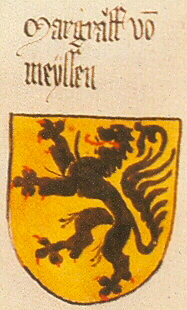
Coat of arms of the Margraves of Meissen, Ingeram Codex (1459)

Coat of arms of the former Meißen district

== Sources ==
- Reuter, Timothy. Germany in the Early Middle Ages 800–1056. New York: Longman, 1991.

== Notes ==
Herman I of Meissen Ekkeharding dynasty Born: c. 980 Died: 1 November 1038
Preceded by Gunzelin	Margrave of Meissen; 1009–1038	Succeeded by Eckard II
