= Milceni =

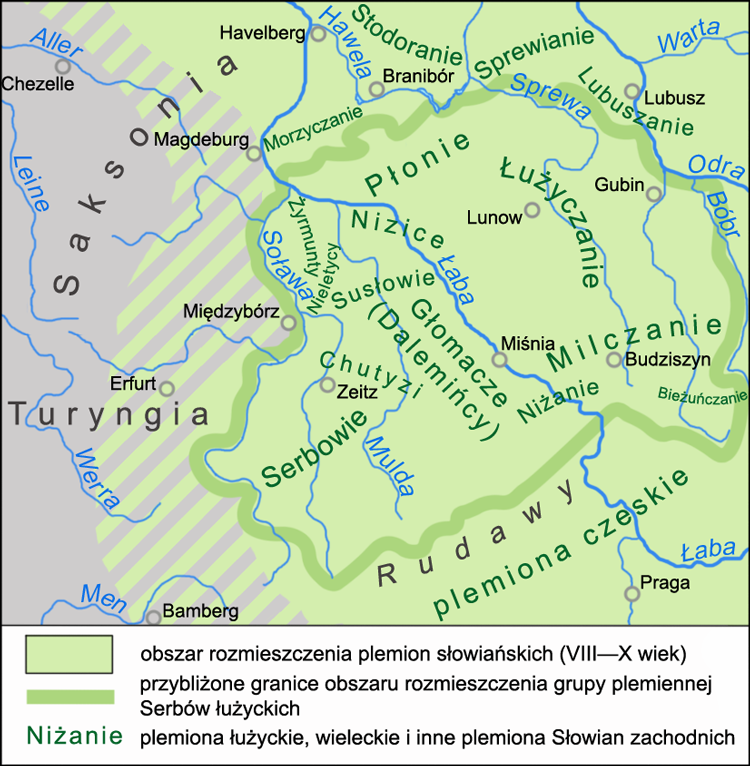
Milchans and other Sorbian tribes during the early medieval period

The Milceni or Milzeni, also known in anglicized form as Milchans (Upper Sorbian: Milčenjo; Lower Sorbian: Milcany; Czech: Milčané; Polish: Milczanie; German: Milzener) (Note: 850 Milzane; 968 Milczane; 971 Milzane; 992 (?) in terram Milze et a fine Milze recte intra Oddere; 1007 in pago Milzani; 1012/18 Milzienos; 1000-1004 Milzini, Milzieni, in Miizaniam, Miizine, Milzanie; 1003 Sclavos Miikianos; 1012/18 Milcini, Milzientos, Miltizieni, Milzeni, Milcieni, Milzini, Milzienos; 1071 in pago Milsca; 1086 Milcianorum; 1091 in regione Milce; 1125 Milcianorum; 1165 in pago Milzana.) were a West Slavic tribe, that lived in medieval Milzavia (Latin: Milzavia marchia), a historical region encompassing upper basins of Neisse, Spree and Black Elster rivers, in present-day Lusatia, divided since 1945 between modern Germany and Poland. They were a Sorbian tribe, belonging to the wider group of Polabian Slavs. During the 10th and 11th centuries, their tribal polity was gradually and successively conquered by Germany, Poland and Bohemia. In periods of German rule, their region initially belonged to the March of Meissen, and later to the Land of Bautzen, known since the 15th century as Upper Lusatia. Modern descendants of the Milceni are the Upper Sorbian-speaking Sorbs of the Free State of Saxony, in Germany.

== Etymology ==
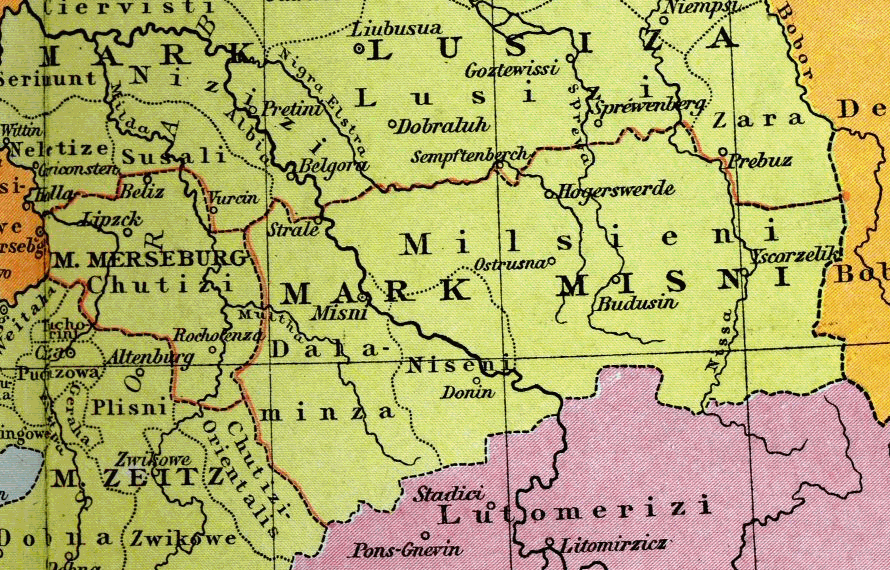
Milsieni lands in the March of Meissen, according to Gustav Droysen (1886)

Pavel Jozef Šafárik derived their name from Lithuanian language milżinas (giant, behemoth, colossus). Mikołaj Rudnicki considered it derives from personal names Milobud and Miloslav. Stanisław Urbańczyk reconstructed the ethnonym as Mělъčane, meaning inhabitants of an assumed river called *Mělъcъ or *Mělъča, with similar argumentation by E. Eichler and H. Walther, possibly as an older name of upper Spree. However, that hypothesis ignores consonant "z" and suffix "-jane", which would reject a form of Milčane, and suggest derivation of Milzane/Milzeni < *Milъt-jane < *Milit-jane from Latin milites (possibly also the case with the Miloxi's name mentioned by Bavarian Geographer). Predrag Komatina derived from Slavic adjective "*milъ" (sweet). Some scholars considered common origin with early Slavic tribe of Milingoi/Melingoi in the Eastern Balkans.

In some publications in English, their name is anglicized as 'Milchans.

== History ==
The exact borders of their settlement area are disputed. It is generally accepted that their fielded land had fruitful loess soil and had dimensions of approximately 50 km from east to west and 20 km from north to south. The northern border was in swampy and partially infertile terrain, while the southern border formed part of the Lausitzer Bergland. The hills of Burkau near Kamenz formed a natural boundary for the Milceni in the west, while their territory bordered that of the Besunzane in the east. The boundaries of the tribe have also been given as the Pulsnitz River in the west and the Kwisa River in the east.

They were first mentioned as Milzane in the middle of the 9th century AD by the Bavarian Geographer as having 30 civitates. In 992 the Dagome iudex records that "in terram Milze et a fine Milze intra Oddere" was bordering Civitas Schinesghe which was Polish realm of king Mieszko I.

German king Henry the Fowler (919-936), defeated the Slavic tribe in 932 and demanded conversion to Christianity, although this was only partially successful. King and emperor Otto I (936-973) defeated the Lusatians in 963 and placed them under the rule of Margrave Gero. The Milceni were subjugated by Margrave Ekkehard I of Meissen ca. 990 and had their territory incorporated into the Holy Roman Empire, but already in 1002, those regions were captured by the Polish duke Bolesław I the Brave, who seized Bautzen (Upper Sorbian: Budyšin) and all lands up to the river Elbe, also taking the neighboring Meissen (Upper Sorbian: Mišno) with all territories up to White Elster river.

Lands of Milceni remained under Polish rule until 1031-1031, when they were recaptured by Germans and reincorporated into the March of Meissen. Enfeoffed to Duke Vratislaus II of Bohemia in 1076, their estates later became known as Land Budissin. The Milceni were still mentioned in the 12th century, both as pago Milzana, and Song of Roland ("the second of big-headed men from Misnes– along the vertebrae all down their backs these men have tufted bristles, just like hogs"). During the 10th–12th centuries, the region of Bautzen was known in written sources (e.g. Thietmar of Merseburg) as Gau Milsca, and in Polish it was known as Milsko until the 15th century.

Since th 15th century, the region became known as Upper Lusatia, in relation to the neighboring Lusatia proper, known since then as Lower Lusatia.

== Society ==
Recent archaeological research shows that in the Milzeni's area exist fortifications and castles of large size, some with additional castles and so on, showing a central authority of power, meanwhile, this is exactly lacking in the nearby area of the tribe of Lusici/Lusatians in Lower Lusatia, revealing no tribal seat and authority there. The network of castles in both Lusatia was probably built as defensive effort prior to the Henry's military campaign.

One of such fortifications was Liubusua Castle mentioned regarding the 932 events by Thietmar of Merserburg, according to whom it needed 3,000 defenders, and north of it was an even larger and older fortification in ruins which could hold 10,000 people. Until the 20th century they couldn't be located, some argued location in Lower Lusatia, but the historical description did not match that area. Recent discoveries identified the Liubusa location at Schlossberg near old village Löbsal 12 km north of Meissen, and north of Schlossberg/Löbsal is largest castle complex in Saxony, the Goldkuppe. This was also supported by toponomastic research, being located on the border between Milceni and Glomatians tribal area.

There's lack of information about the princes of Milceni and Lusici, possibly of Milzeni being certain venerabilis senior Dobremirus married to Saxon count's daughter and father of Emnilda (wife of Bolesław I the Brave), mentioned by Thietmar of Merserburg.

== See also ==
- List of Medieval Slavic tribes

== Sources ==
- Bachrach, David S. (2020). "The Eastern Campaigns of King Henry II of Germany, 1003–17". Journal of Medieval Military History. 18: 1–36.
- Bak, János M.; Rychterová, Pavlína, eds. (2020). Cosmae Pragensis Chronica Bohemorum: Cosmas of Prague, The Chronicle of the Czechs. Budapest-New York: Central European University Press.
- Havlíková, Lubomíra (2016). "What was the location of Serbia mentioned in the Cosmas Chronicle of the Czechs?". Споменица др тибора Живковића. Београд: Историјски институт. pp. 185–191.
- Kmietowicz, Frank A. (1976). Ancient Slavs. Stevens Point: Worzalla Publishing Company.
- Коматина, Предраг (2019). "Рани јужнословенски етноними и питање порекла и постанка јужнословенских племена" [Early South Slavic Ethnonyms and the Issue of Origin and Genesis of the South Slavic Tribes]. Наслеђе и стварање: Свети Ћирило - Свети Сава: 869-1219-2019 (in Serbian). Vol. 1. Београд: Институт за српски језик. pp. 3–28.
- Коматина, Предраг (2020). "Славянские этнонимы «баварского географа»: Историко-лингвистический анализ" [Slavic ethnonyms in the Bavarian Geographer: A historiographic linguistic analysis]. Studia Slavica et Balcanica Petropolitana (in Russian). 27 (1): 127–128.
- Kunstmann, Heinrich (1987). Beiträge zur Geschichte der Besiedlung Nord- und Mitteldeutschlands mit Balkanslaven. München: Otto Sagner.
- Pech, Edmund (2015). "Milzener, Lusizer und Glomaci-Daleminzer: Kontroversen zur frühen Geschichte der Sorben" [Milceni, Luzici and Glomaci-Daleminci: Controversies concerning the early History of the Sorbs]. LĚTOPIS. Zeitschrift für sorbische Sprache, Geschichte und Kultur: Časopis za rěč, stawizny a kulturu Łužiskich Serbow (in German). 62 (2): 119–132.
- Stieldorf, Andrea (2026) [2012]. Marken und Markgrafen: Studien zur Grenzsicherung durch die fränkisch-deutschen Herrscher (2nd ed.). Wiesbaden: Harrassowitz Verlag.
- Trillmich, Werner, ed. (1957). Thietmar von Merseburg: Chronik. Darmstadt: Wissenschaftliche Buchgesellschaf.
- Warner, David A., ed. (2001). Ottonian Germany: The Chronicon of Thietmar of Merseburg. Manchester and New York: Manchester University Press.
