= Adalbert, Count of Ballenstedt =

Earliest known ancestor of the House of Ascania

Adalbert of Ballenstedt
- Born: c. 970
- Died: c. 1005 {aged 34-35}
- Noble family: House of Ascania
- Spouse: Hidda (?)
- Issue: Esico of Ballenstedt

Adalbert von Ballenstedt c. 970, (name uncertain, but possibly Adalbert), was Count of Ballenstedt, Vogt of the Nienburg Abbey, and the provost of Hagenrode. He is the earliest known ancestor of the House of Ascania.

== Life ==
The details of "Adalbert's" life are unclear. Even his name is not known; it is believed to be "Adalbert", his grandson's name. It is known that he was the father of Esico, the first to be called "Ascanian," from his marriage with Hidda, daughter of Odo I, Margrave of the Saxon Ostmark. Hodo was related to Margrave Christian of Thuringia from the Gau Serimunt, from whom, through the descendants of Esico, possessions in this area and the bailiwick of Nienburg and Frose possibly originated.

The Sachsenspiegel reported that Adalbert's ancestors came with the immigration of Swabian tribes around 568 into the area on the Lower Harz known as the Schwabengau, and have settled there.

Other children of Adalbert may have been:

- Uta von Ballenstedt, known as "Uta von Naumburg", later married to Eckard II, Margrave of Meissen
- Dietrich, later provost of Ballenstedt
- Ludolf, later monk at the Imperial Abbey of Corvey
- Hazecha, later abbess of Gernrode Abbey

== Literature ==
- Helmut Assing: Die frühen Askanier und ihre Frauen. Kulturstiftung Bernburg, Bernburg 2002, ISBN 3-9805532-9-9. S. 6
- Andreas Thiele: Erzählende genealogische Stammtafeln zur europäischen Geschichte. Band 1: Deutsche Kaiser-, Königs-, Herzogs- und Grafenhäuser. Teilband 1. R. G. Fischer, Frankfurt am Main 1991, ISBN 3-89406-460-9. Tafel 172
- Hermann Wäschke: Anhaltische Geschichte. Band 1: Geschichte Anhalts von den Anfängen bis zum Ausgang des Mittelalters. Otto Schulze, Cöthen 1912. S. 68
