= Thietmar I =

Thietmar I, Dietmar I or Ditmar I may refer to:

- Dietmar I (archbishop of Salzburg) (died 907)
- Thietmar, Count of Merseburg (died 932), sometimes numbered Thietmar I
- Thietmar, Margrave of Meissen (died 979), sometimes numbered Thietmar I
- Ditmar I (abbot of Corvey) (r. 983–1001)
- Dietmar I, bishop of Verden (r. 1031–1034)
- Dietmar I, abbot of Niederaltaich Abbey (r. 1049–1055)
- Thietmar I, abbot of Helmarshausen Abbey (fl. 1058–1068)
- Dietmar I, abbot of Metten Abbey (r. 1057–1078)
- Dietmar I, abbot of Seitenstetten Abbey (r. 1210–1223)
