= Esico of Ballenstedt =

11th-century progenitor of the House of Ascania

- Died: c. 1060
- Noble family: House of Ascania
- Spouse: Matilda of Swabia
- Issue: Adalbert II, Count of Ballenstedt
- Father: Adalbert, Count of Ballenstedt (?)
- Mother: Hidda (?)

Esico of Ballenstedt (died around 1060) is the progenitor of the House of Ascania, (i.e., the oldest known member of his dynasty). Esico was the count of Ballenstedt (r. 1036-1060), and his possessions became the nucleus of the later Principality of Anhalt.

== Life ==
=== Parents and siblings ===
Esico is also known as Esiko and Hesicho. His father is sometimes assumed to have been one Adalbert of Ballenstedt, who had married Hidda, a daughter of Margrave Odo I of the Saxon Eastern March, but there is no hard evidence for this. Thereby, Esico would have been a brother of Uta von Ballenstedt, the consort of Margrave Eckard II of Meissen, and of Hazecha, abbess of Gernrode. He may have also had a brother named Dietrich.

=== Career ===
Little is known about him, but he is assumed to have been count of the Saxon Schwabengau, Harzgau and Nordthüringgau with his seat at Ballenstedt Castle.

Esico was first mentioned in a 1036 deed issued by Emperor Conrad II, and then until eight further charters issued up to 1059. He is also referred to in the 13th century chronicle, the Annalista Saxo, as Esicus de Ballenstide. He is assumed to have inherited large properties in the Saxon Eastern March from his maternal grandfather Margrave Odo I. He was the count of Ballenstedt from at least about 1036 until his death in about 1060.

In about 1043, he likely founded a collegiate church dedicated to Pancras of Rome and Abundius near his castle, castle Ballenstedt. He was among the founders of Naumburg Cathedral, of which his sister, Uta was a major donor. It is occasionally stated that Esico built the first buildings of Anhalt Castle in 1050, but other sources consider that castle to have been built by Esico's grandson, Otto, Count of Ballenstedt, in about 1123.

When Uta and Eckard died childless in 1045 and 1046 respectively, their property was to revert to Henry III, Holy Roman Emperor, but Esico ensured that major parts of their inheritance were given to the control of the Gernrode Abby, where their sister, Hazecha, had been abbess since 1043.

Esico's possessions became the nucleus of the later Principality of Anhalt.

=== Marriage and Children ===
Esico was married to a woman named Matilda. Following an entry in the Annalista Saxo, Esico is sometimes said to have married Matilda of Swabia, daughter of Herman II of Swabia, and sister-in-law of Emperor Conrad II, around 1026. This is possible, as Matilda's second husband, Frederick of Bar, is thought to have died c.1026 (although he may have lived until 1033). Alternatively, his wife may have been Matilda of Werl.

With his wife, Esico had three children:

- Adalbert II, Count of Ballenstedt, who succeeded Esico as count of Ballenstedt.
- Adelaide of Ballenstadt, wife of Thiemo of Schraplau.
- Otto

== Sources ==
- Schlenker, Gerlinde, Kloster Ballenstedt - das Hauskloster der aelteren Grafen von Anhalt, in Harz-Zeitschrift für den Harz-Verein für Geschichte und Altertumskunde e.V., Lukas Verlag (2012)
- Feicker, Bernd, Das Vorwek des Reichsstiftes Gernrode und das Kuechengut der Blankenburger, in Harz-Zeitschrift für den Harz-Verein für Geschichte und Altertumskunde e.V., Lukas Verlag (2012)
- W. Mohr, Geschichte des Herzogtums Lothringen, vol. 1 (1974).
- Annalista Saxo, in Die Reichschronik des Annalista Saxo, ed. K. Nass, MGH SS 37 (Munich, 2006), accessible online at: Monumenta Germaniae Historica.
- Helmut Assing, Die frühen Askanier und ihre Frauen. Kulturstiftung Bernburg 2002.
- Lutz Partenheimer, Albrecht der Bär. Gründer der Mark Brandenburg und des Fürstentums Anhalt. Böhlau, Köln, Weimar, Wien 2001. ISBN 3-412-06301-0.
- W. Trillmich, Kaiser Konrad II. und seine Zeit (Bonn, 1991).
- A. Thiele, Erzählende genealogische Stammtafeln zur europäischen Geschichte, vol. I, Teilband 1 Deutsche Kaiser-, Königs-, Herzogs- und Grafenhäuser I.
