= Thankmarsfelde =

Former monastery in Harz Mountains, Germany

Thankmarsfelde was a former Benedictine monastery in the Harz Mountains of Germany, south of Ballenstedt.

It was founded and endowed by Archbishop Gero of Cologne and his brother, Margrave Thietmar on 29 August 970 in the church in Thankmarsfelde. The monastery was moved to Nienburg Abbey in 975 with the aim of bringing the Christian faith to the Sorb population in Gau Serimuntt. The founding of the monastery was confirmed by Pope John XIII on 25 December 971.
