= Thietmar, Count of Merseburg =

German noble (d. 932)

Thietmar (I) (also Thiatmar, Dietmar, or Thiommar) (died 1 June 932), Count and Margrave, was the military tutor (vir disciplinae militaris peritissmus) of Henry the Fowler while he was the heir and then duke of the Duchy of Saxony. He probably kept a small body of elite retainers (though he once feigned at having thirty legions behind him) armed with the latest in military technology and well-supplied with expensive horses. His armored cavalry played a decisive role in winning the Battle of Lenzen on 4 September 929, securing German domination along the Elbe river against West Slavic peoples.

He married Hildegard, the maternal aunt of Hatheburg of Merseburg, first wife of Henry the Fowler. Thietmar's wife left him two sons, Siegfried, Count of Merseburg, and Gero the Great. His daughter, Hidda, married Christian of Thuringia and was the mother of Thietmar, Margrave of Meissen, Archbishop Gero of Cologne and Odo I, Margrave of the Saxon Ostmark.

== Sources ==
- Leyser, Karl. "Henry I and the Beginnings of the Saxon Empire." The English Historical Review, Vol. 83, No. 326. (Jan., 1968), pp. 1–32.
