= University and State Library Darmstadt =

German academic library (2004–)

- Universitäts- und Landesbibliothek Darmstadt
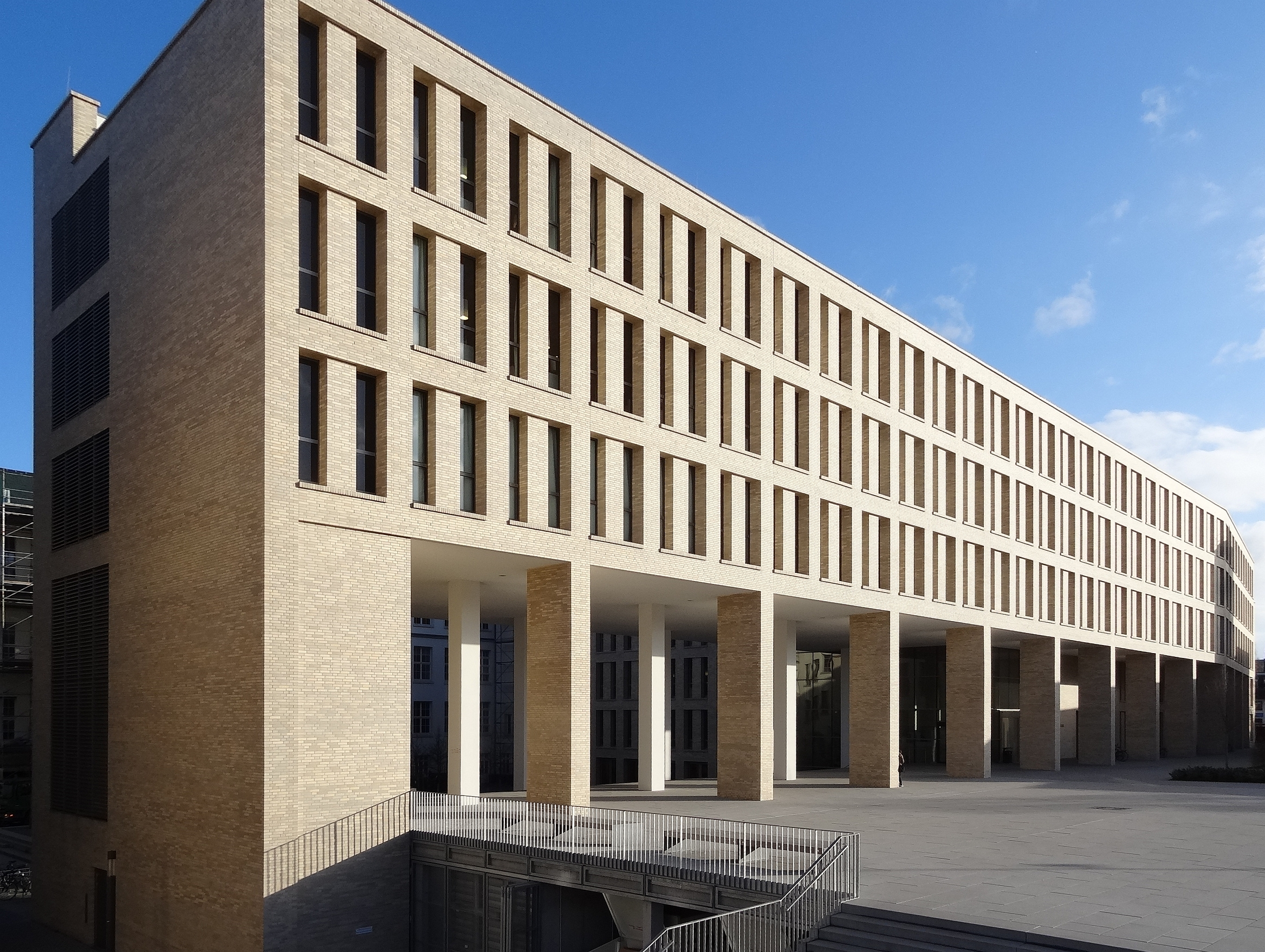
- ULB Darmstadt in 2015
- 49°52′36″N 8°39′27″E
- Location: Magdalenenstraße 8, 64289 Darmstadt, Germany
- Established: 1567; 459 years ago, 2000 integration TU Darmstadt
- Branches: 2 (Schloss, Lichtwiese)

Collection
- Size: 4.7 million publications (2021)
- Legal deposit: Yes, southern Hesse and the Giessen region.

Access and use
- Access requirements: Open
- Circulation: 302,200 books (2023)
- Population served: Members of the TU Darmstadt and the population of Darmstadt and southern Hesse
- Members: 11,228 (2023, active)

Other information
- Director: Thomas Stäcker
- Employees: 103.66 FTE (2021)
- Public transit access: Tram, bus: Schloss
- Website: Official website

The University and State Library Darmstadt (German: Universitäts- und Landesbibliothek Darmstadt (ULB)) supplies literature and information for members of the Technische Universität Darmstadt and the population of Darmstadt and southern Hesse. Its purposes include education, research, and teaching. As of 2021, the library has a stock of 4,756,277 publications with an annual circulation of 302,200; ULB has 220,000 visitors and employs a staff of 103.66 FTE. The ULB offers learning rooms and spaces for over 1000 people at three locations. Director is Thomas Stäcker. ULB Darmstadt is member of the Hessisches Bibliotheksinformationssystem (hebis).

== History ==
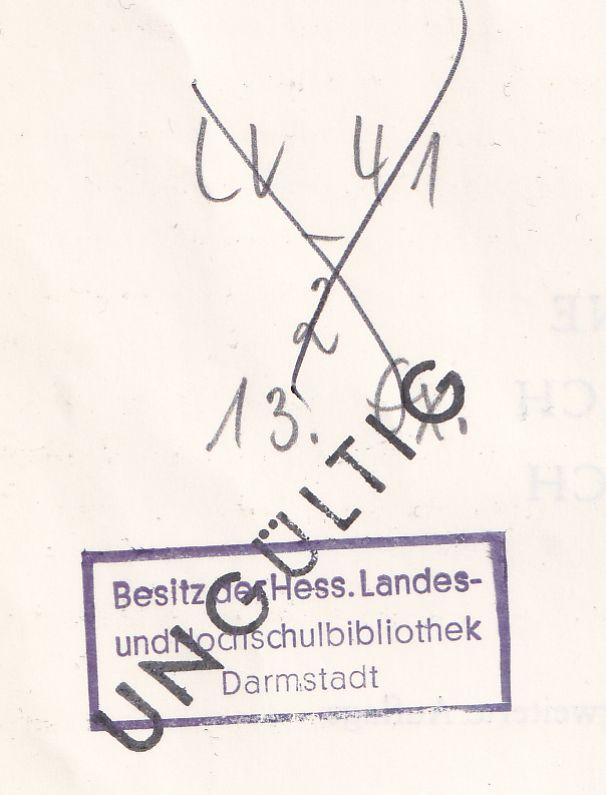
Hessische Hochschul- und Landesbibliothek book stamp

The library's basis was the book collection of George I, Landgrave of Hesse-Darmstadt in 1567, the year the landgrave moved to Darmstadt. In 1595, the collection comprised c. 750 works. The Darmstädter Hofbibliothek was located in the Residential Palace Darmstadt (Schloss). Louis VI, Landgrave of Hesse-Darmstadt acquired the library of the Hanau Privy Councilor Johann Michael Moscherosch (1601–1669) with c. 2300 books, which was placed in the Glockenbau (bell building), part of the Schloss. The first librarian Johann Balthasar Moscherosch took office in 1692. Louis I, Grand Duke of Hesse (1753–1830), with his passion for collecting, promoted the library (1789: 16,000 volumes). During secularization in 1803, libraries of the Benedictines in Seligenstadt, the Dominicans in Wimpfen, the Capuchins in Bensheim and Dieburg and the Carmelites in Hirschhorn were brought to Darmstadt. A substantial addition in 1805 was the collection of Cologne's Baron von Hüpsch (1750–1805). In 1834, under Louis II, Grand Duke of Hesse, the library moved to the new Baroque part (De-la-Fosse-Bau) of the Schloss. It was the ninth largest library of the German empire in 1902, grown to 564,000 volumes in 1914 and named Hessische Landesbibliothek in 1920. In the During the fire night (Brandnacht) on 11 to 12 September 1944 the library in the Schloss was partly destroyed and the majority of the books were burned. In 1948, the institution was merged with the former Technische Hochschule library to the Hessische Hochschul- und Landesbibliothek.

After its integration into the Technische Universität Darmstadt in 2000, it received its new name in 2004. In 2012, ULB Darmstadt moved to a new building.

== Collections ==
- Baron von Hüpsch Collection
- Keyserling estate
- Hitda Codex
- Prayer book of Stephan Lochner
- Gero Codex (Note: Documents inscribed in the UNESCO Memory of the World Register.)
- Golden Bull of 1356, Cologne edition
- Manuscripts by Christoph Graupner

== Gallery ==
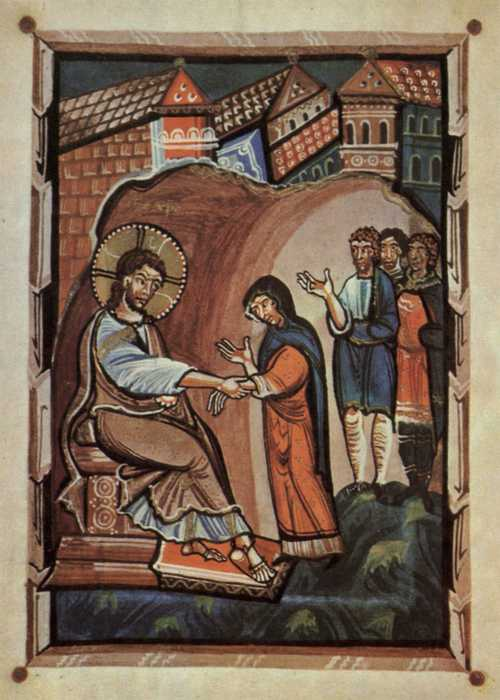
Healing Saint Peter's Mother-in-law, from an 11th-century manuscript from the Abbes Hitda von Meschede (Hitda Codex)

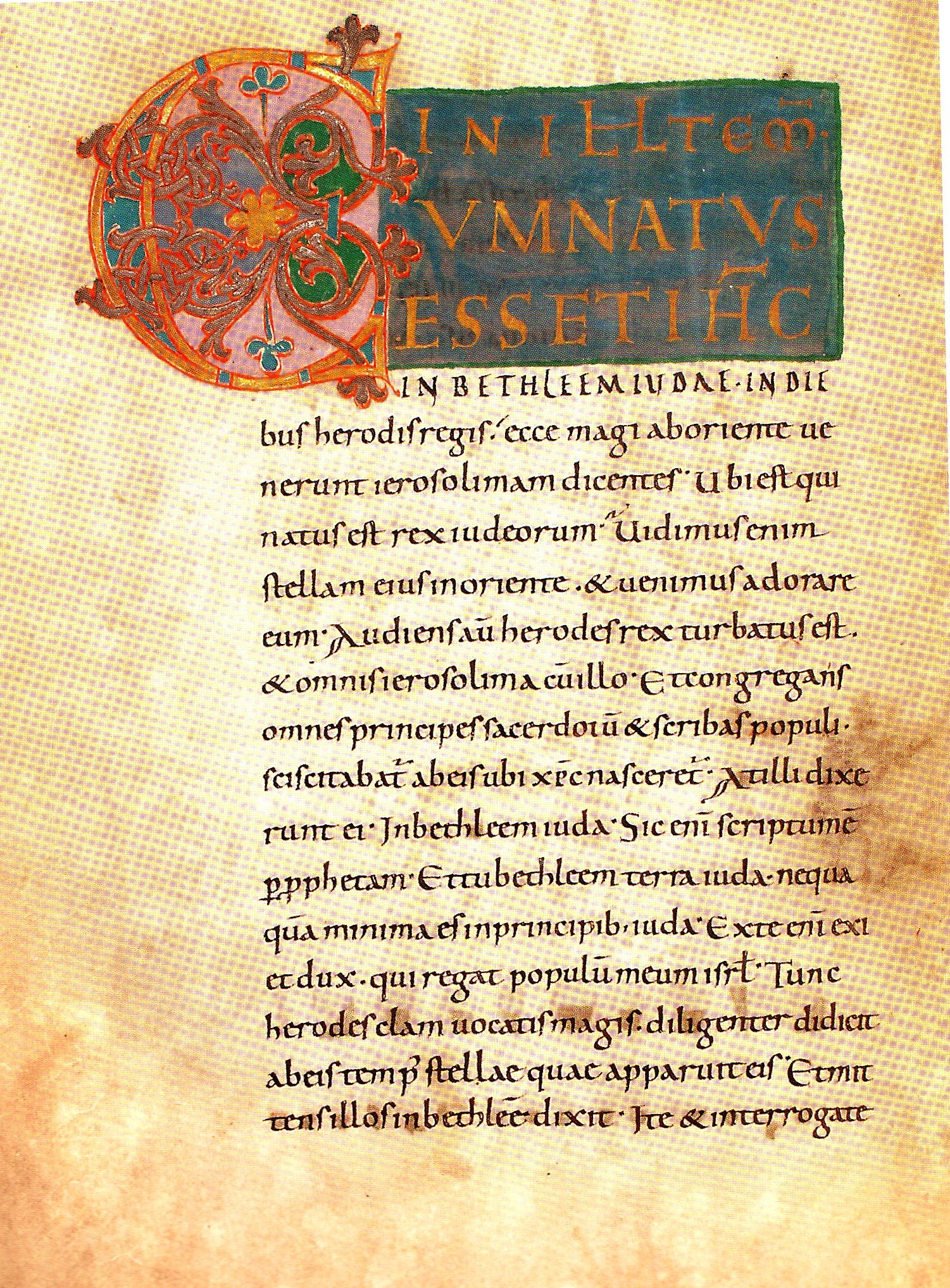
Text of Gero Codex

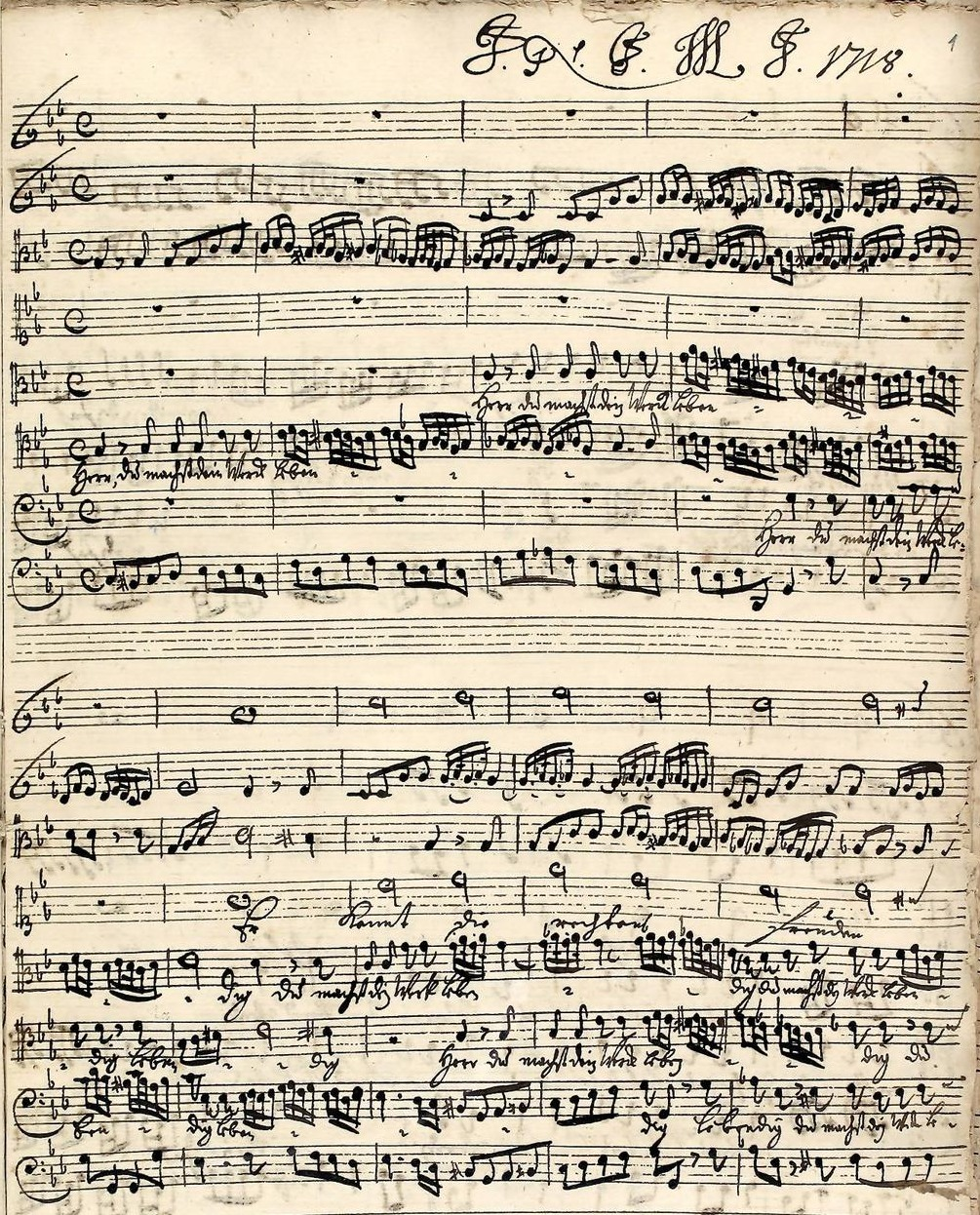
The first page of the score of Christoph Graupner's cantata Herr du machst dein Werk lebendig (GWV 1113/18)

== Main building ==
- City Centre (Stadtmitte), Magdalenenstraße 8, 64289 Darmstadt (ISIL DE-17)

The building, designed by the architecture firm Bär, Stadelmann, Stöcker Architekten BDA, opened on 12 November 2012.

== Branches ==
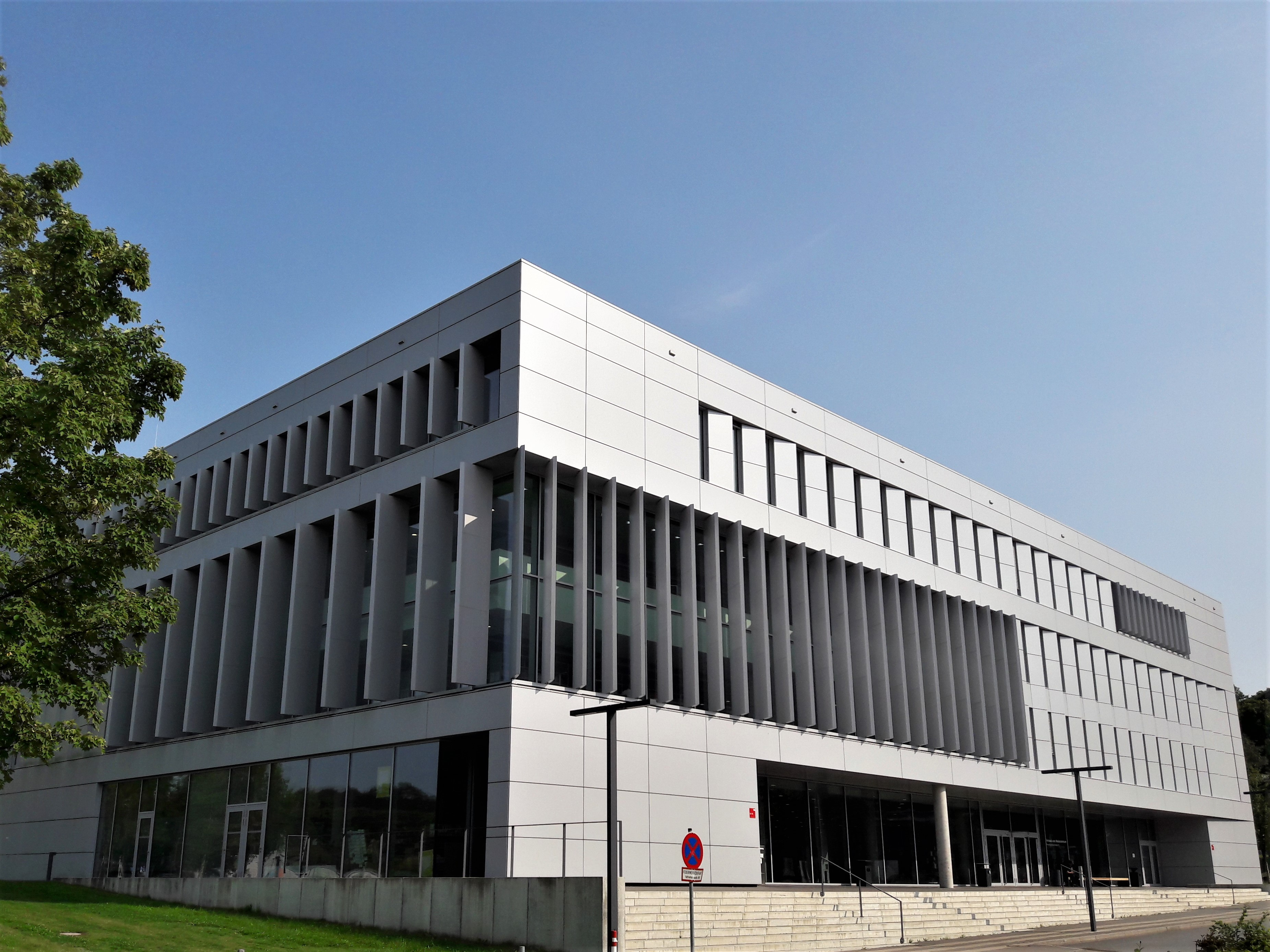
Lecture Halls and Library Building at Lichtwiese Campus

Sources:

- Lichtwiese, Franziska-Braun-Straße 10, 64287 Darmstadt (ISIL DE-17-2) (opened 27 May 2013)
- Residential Palace Darmstadt (Schloss), Residenzschloss 1, 64289 Darmstadt (focus on humanities)

== Map ==
University and State Library Darmstadt
University and State Library Darmstadt
1 Library City Centre (Main)
2 Library Lichtwiese (Branch)
3 Library Schloss (Branch)

== See also ==
- Technische Universität Darmstadt
