= Hazecha of Ballenstedt =

Abbess of Gernrode from 1044 to 1063

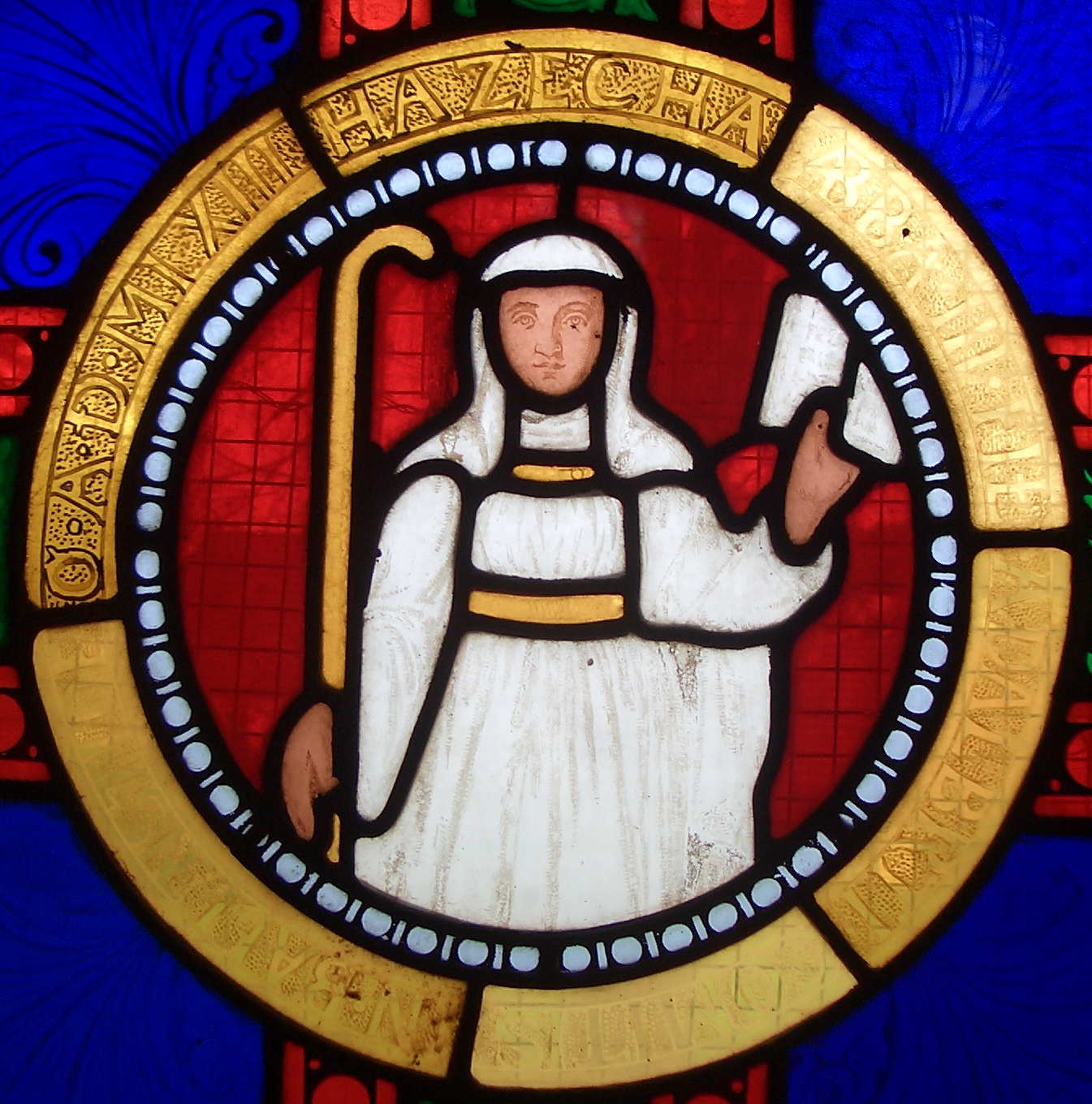
- Stained glass image of Abbess Hazecha of Gernrode

Abbess of Gernrode
- Reign: 1044 – 1063
- Predecessor: Adelaide I of Gernrode
- Successor: Hedwig II of Gernrode
- Died: 1063; Gernrode Abbey
- Noble family: House of Ascania
- Father: Adalbert of Ballenstedt?
- Mother: Hidda?

Hazecha of Ballenstedt (died 1063) was a member of the House of Ascania, and the third abbess of Gernrode (r.1044-1063).

== Life ==
Hazecha was a member of the House of Ascania. Her parents are sometimes said to have been Adalbert of Ballenstedt and Hidda, daughter of Margrave Odo I of the Saxon Eastern March, although there is no direct evidence for this. If so, Hazecha had at least two siblings: Esico of Ballenstedt, Uta von Ballenstedt, who married Margrave Eckhard II of Meissen. She may have also had two other brothers, Ludolf, who became a monk at Corvey, and Dietrich, provost of Ballenstedt. Esico’s great-grandson, Albert the Bear, is the first documented advocate of the abbey of Gernrode. From this point onwards, until the dissolution of the abbey, members of the Askanier dynasty held the advocacy of Gernrode.

Hazecha was the successor of Abbess Adelaide I. Under her rule, the abbey increased its possessions through many donations.

According to the 'Annals of Gernrode' (Annales Gernrodensis), written by the chronicler Andreas Popperodt in the sixteenth century, Hazecha was abbess of Gernrode for nineteen years. She is, however, only attested as abbess in two imperial diplomas from February 1044 and February 1046.

Hazecha’s brother-in-law, Eckhard II of Meissen, also made a large donation to Gernrode before his death, because his marriage to Hazecha’s sister, Uta, had remained childless. Eckhard’s donation was confirmed by Henry III in February 1046. The donation included property in Gundersleve, in Westerhausen, where Gernrode already had possessions, and in Wendhusen, now in the district of Thale, as well as abandoned villages near Wegeleben, in Mordorf and Richbrechtigerode, both near Blankenburg, and Egihardingerode and Dorbonrod, whose modern locations are unknown.
