= Hitda Codex =

The Hitda Codex is an eleventh-century codex containing an evangeliary, a selection of passages from the Gospels, commissioned by Hitda, abbess of Meschede in about 1020. It is held at University and State Library Darmstadt. Hitda is depicted in the book's dedication miniature presenting the codex to the convent's patron, Saint Walburga. St. Walburga stands on a pedestal in the center of the composition, and has a golden halo surrounding her head. Behind the two women is the monastery that Hitda oversees, which fills the entire background.

The illuminations are highlights of the Cologne school in the later phases of the Ottonian Renaissance. The Hitda Codex contains the only surviving Life of Christ cycle of illuminations produced in Cologne from this period. The cycle's cultural context has been replicated by Henry Mayr-Harting.

== Gallery ==
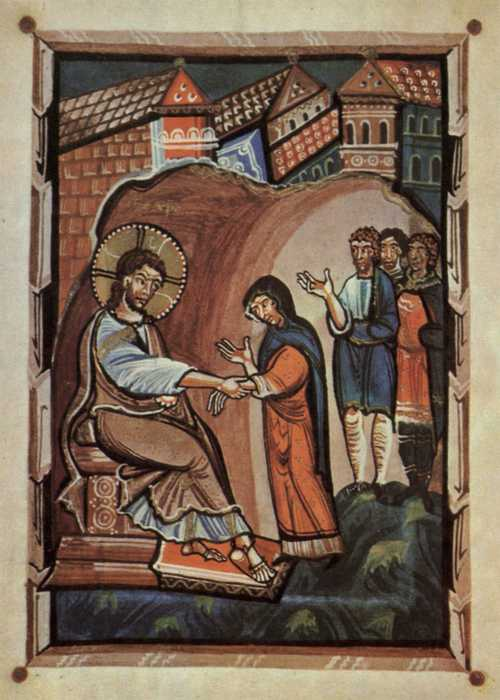
The Healing of St Peter's mother-in-law

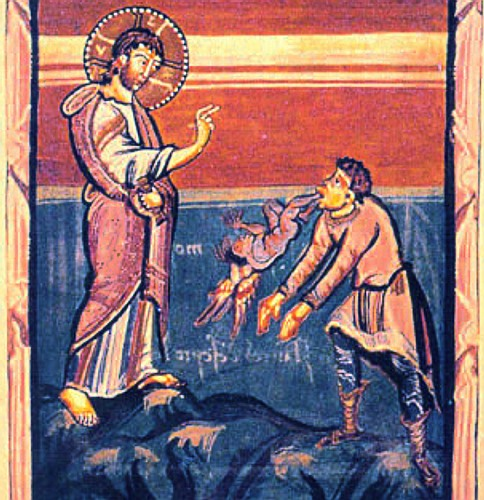
Healing of the demon-possessed

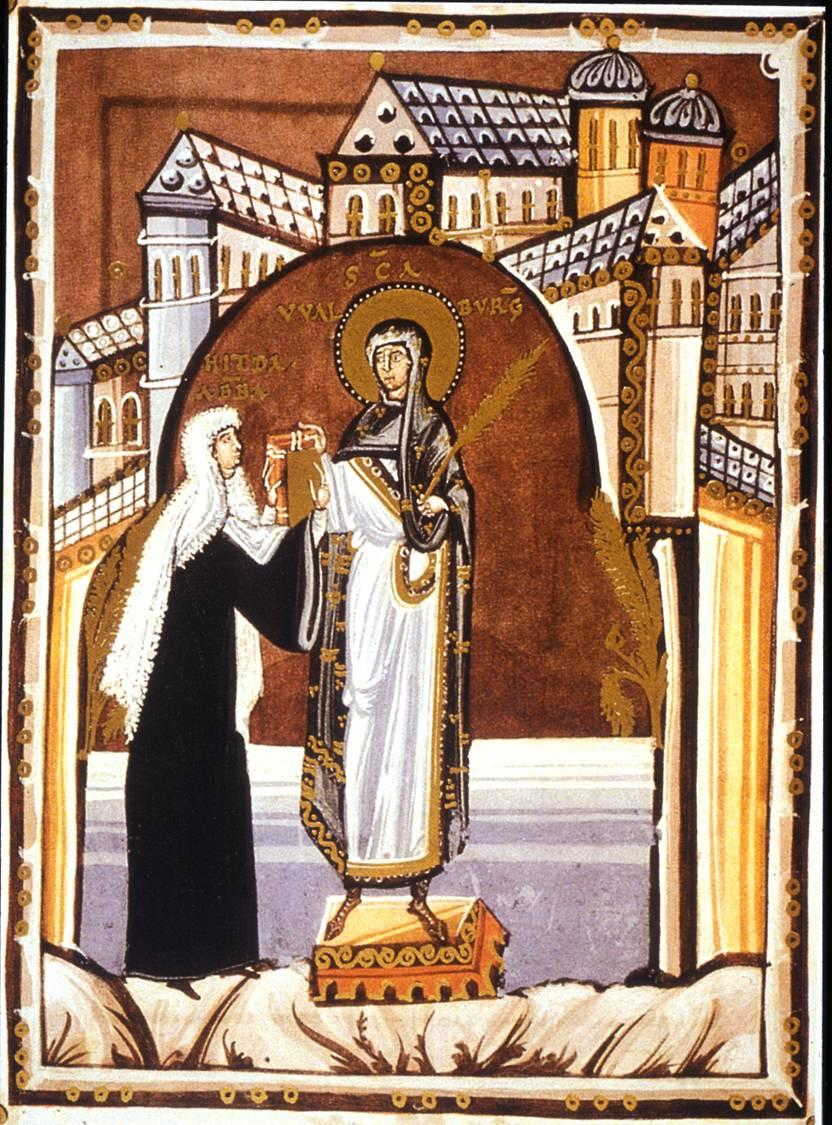
Dedication miniature

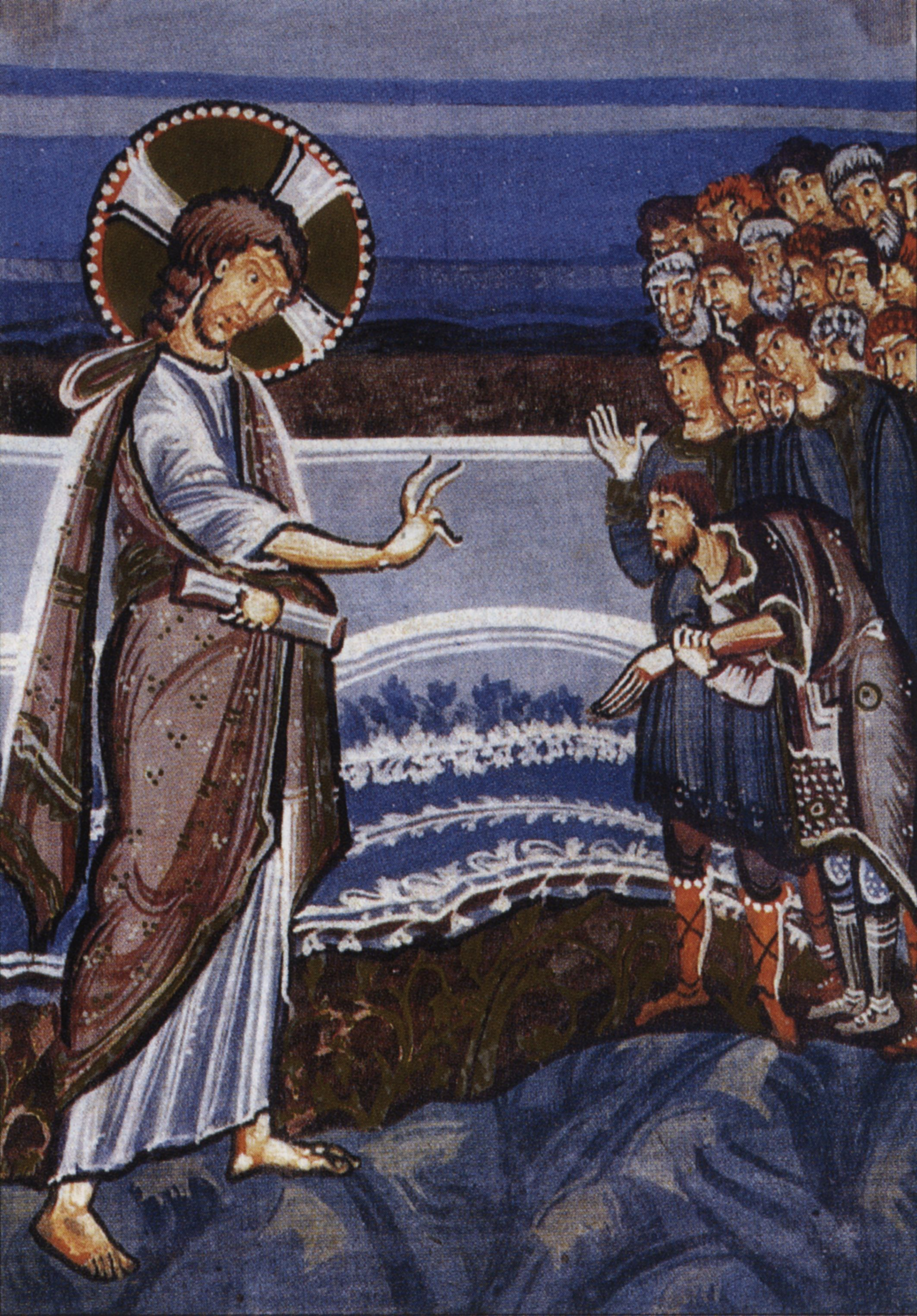
Healing of a man with a withered hand

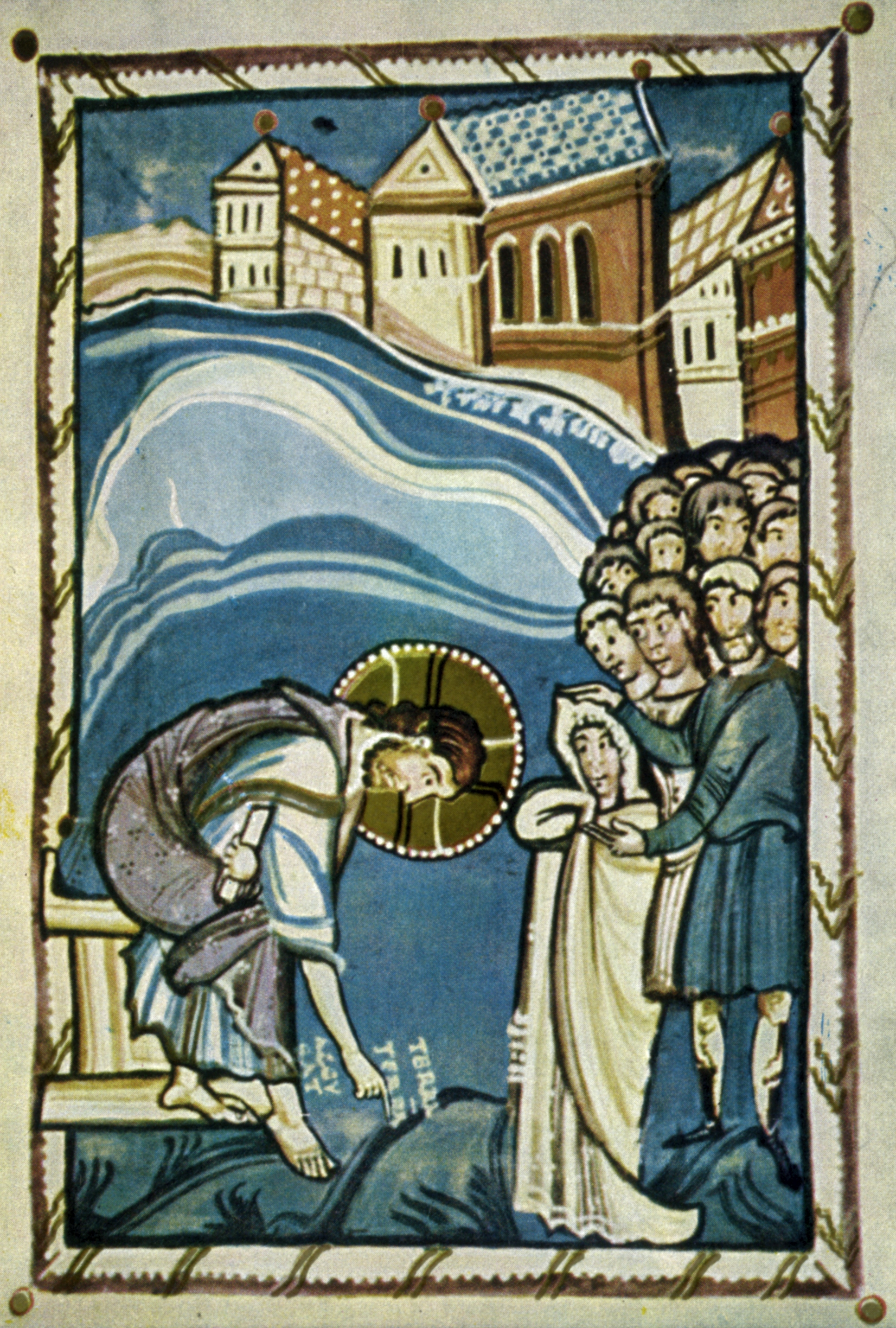
Jesus and the woman taken in adultery

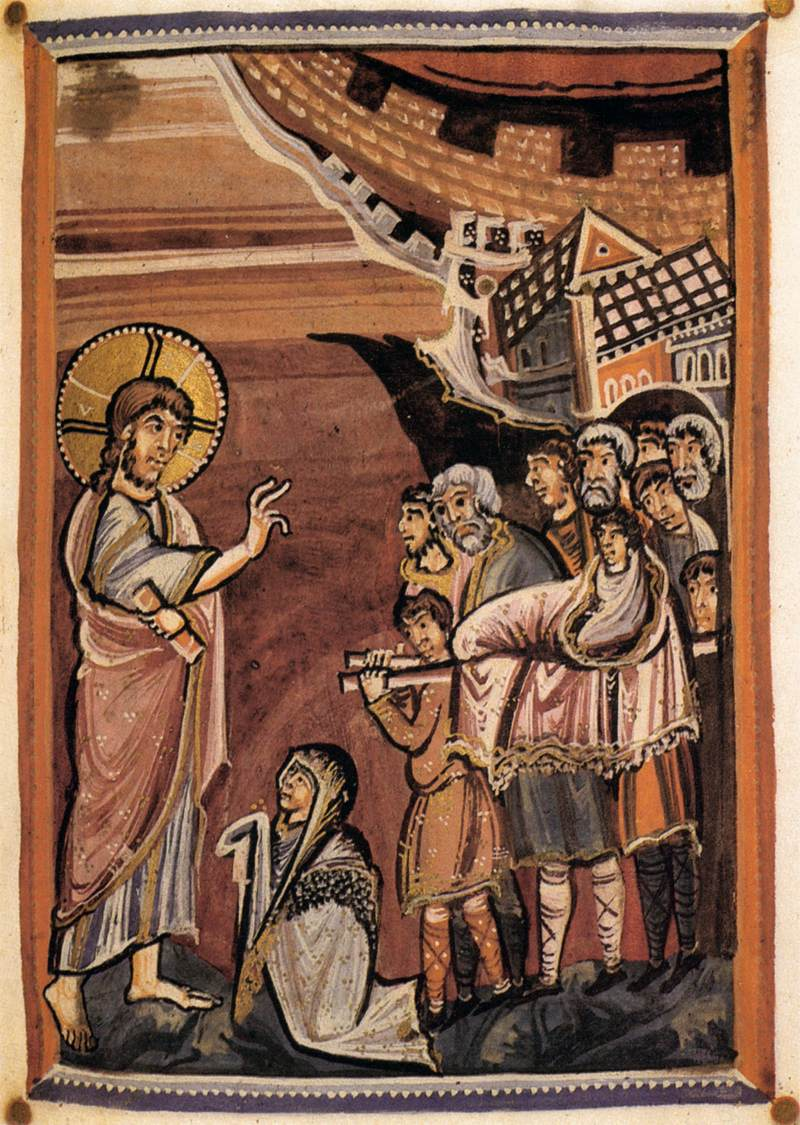
Raising of the son of the widow of Nain

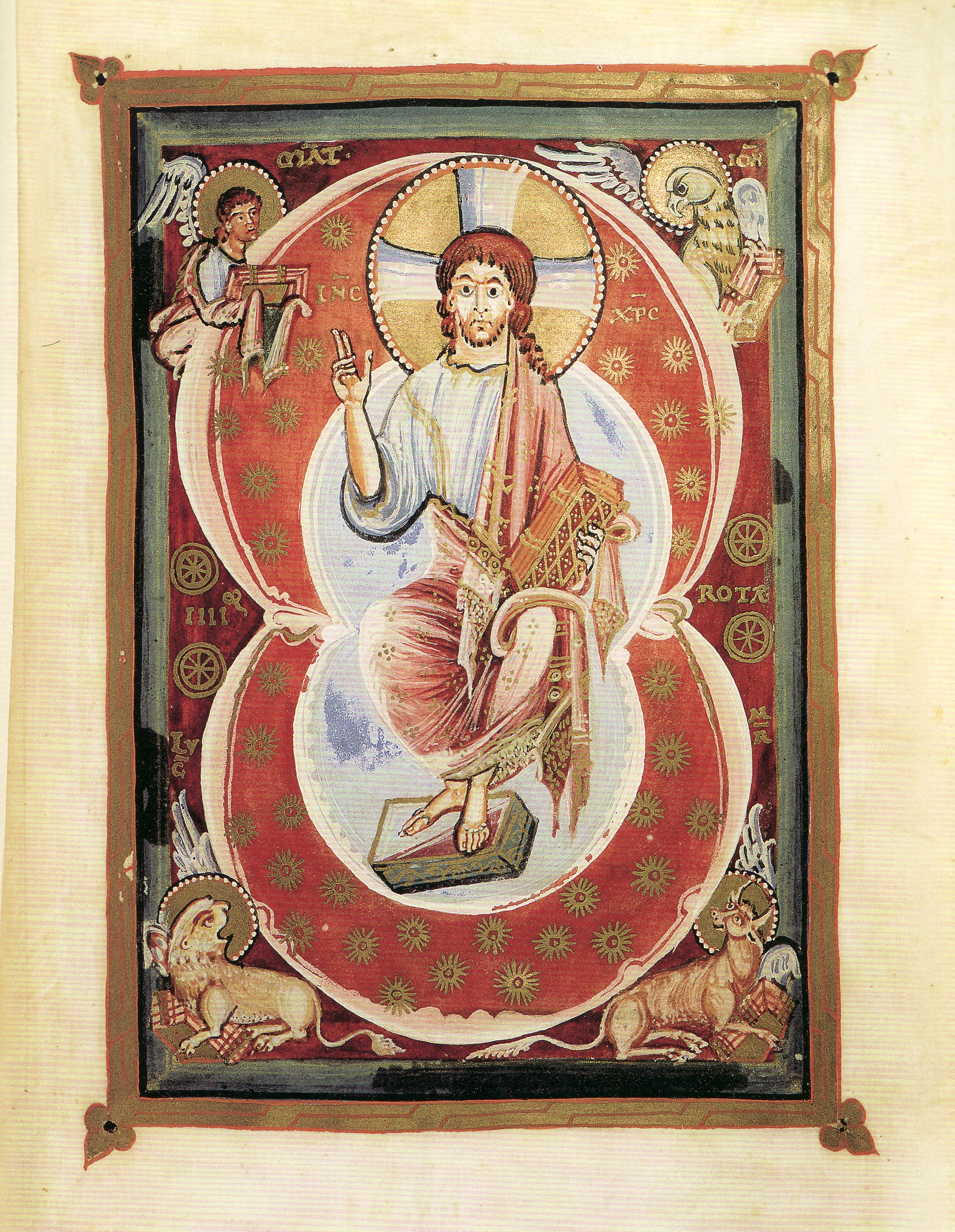
Christ in Majesty

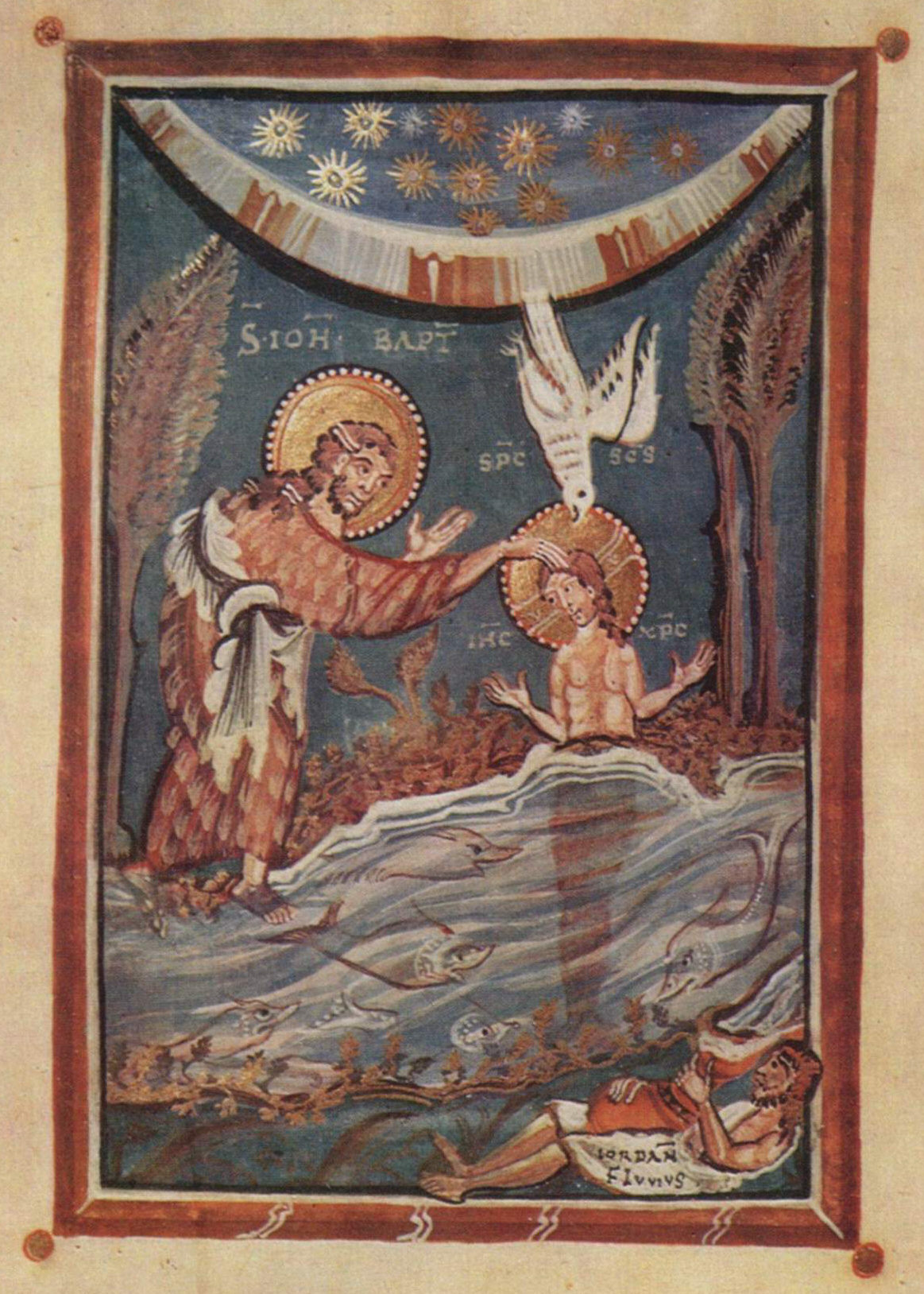
Baptism of Christ

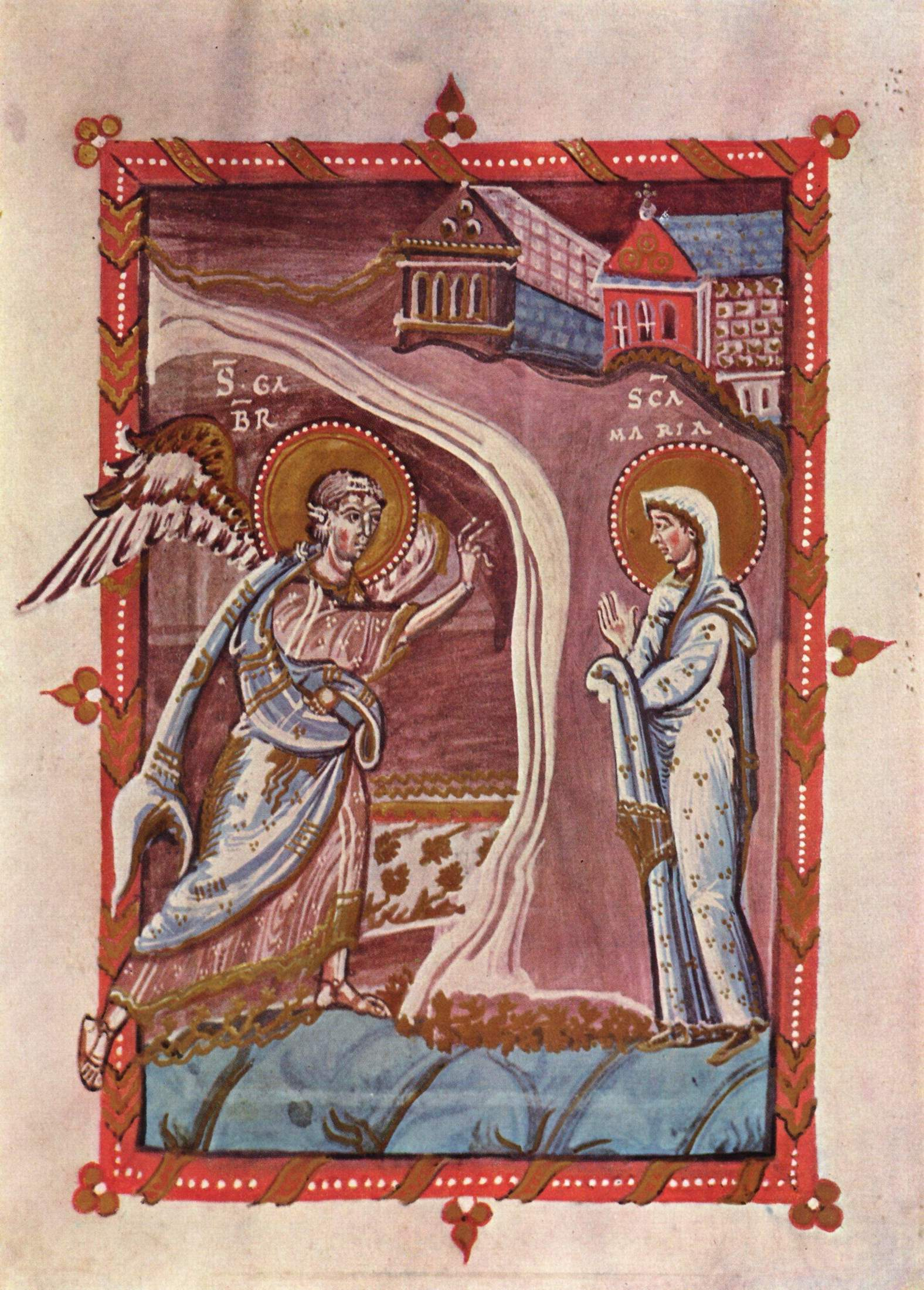
Annunciation

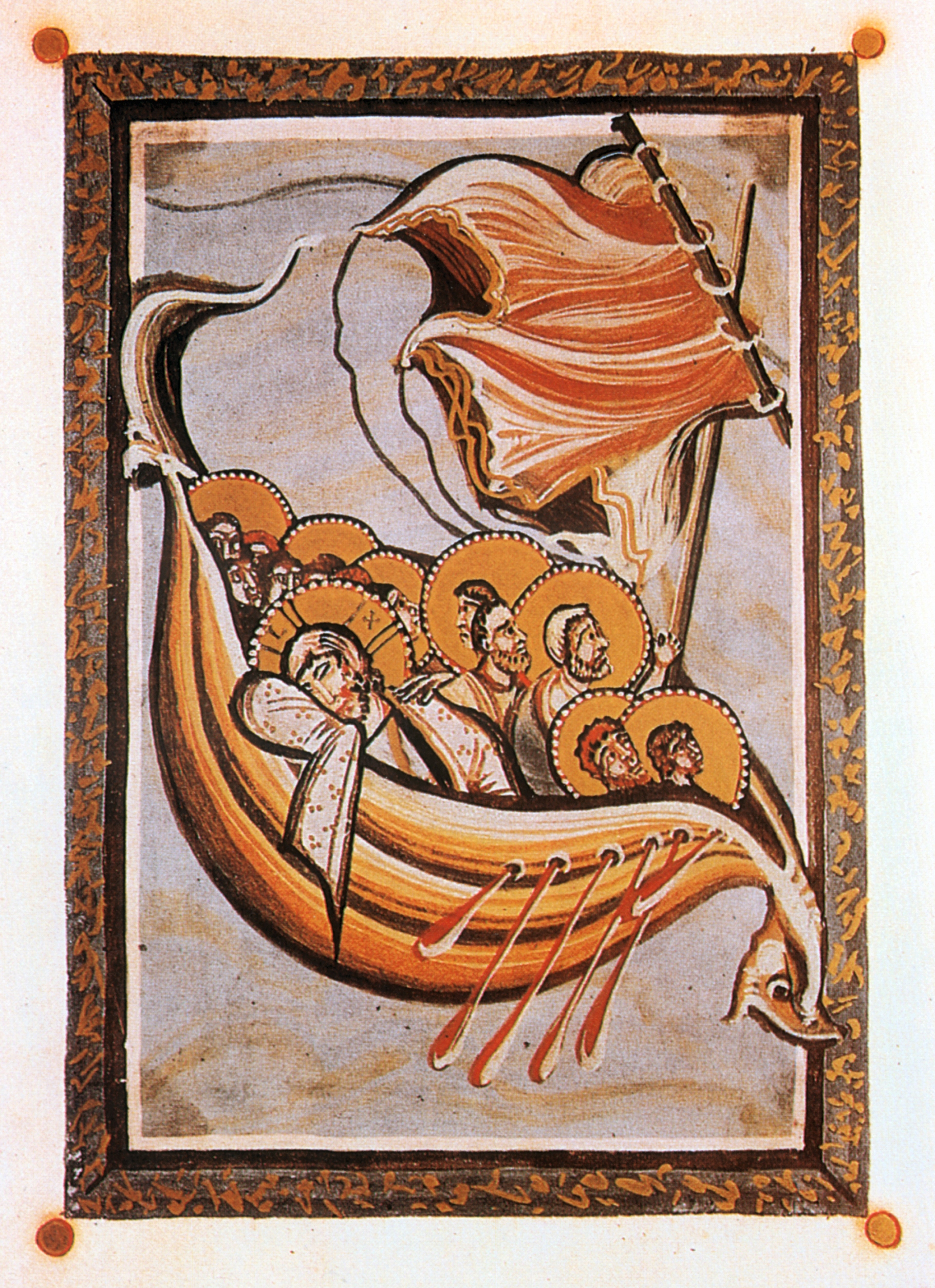
Calming the storm
