= Gero Codex =

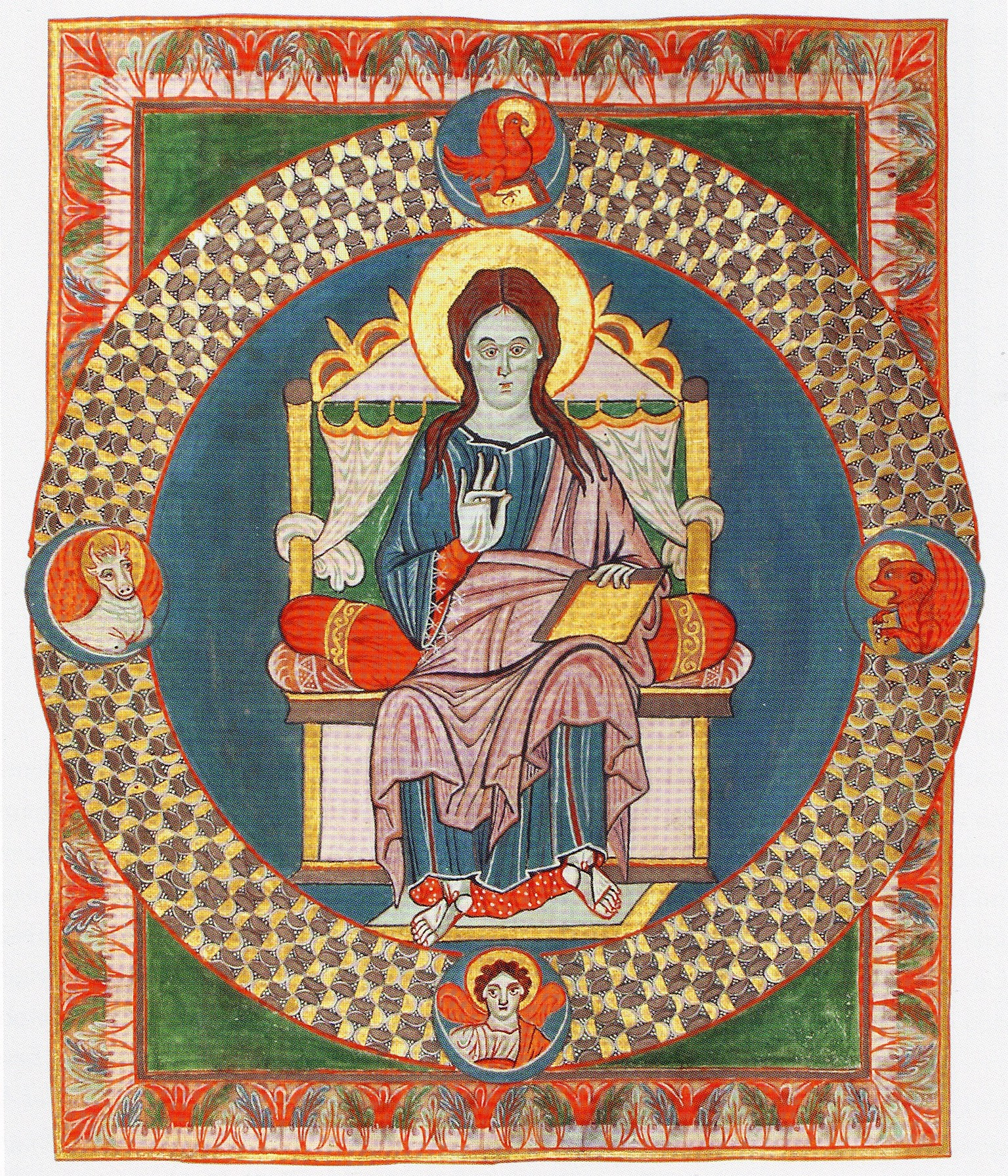
Christ in Majesty with Evangelists surrounding

The Gero Codex or Gero-Codex is an Ottonian illuminated manuscript probably produced at Reichenau Abbey in Germany between 950 and 970. It is one of the first and most splendid of the Eburnant group of early Ottonian manuscripts.

It contains miniatures of the four evangelists, the monk-scribe Anno handing it to Gero (probably of Cologne) and Gero handing it to Saint Peter.

The manuscripts illuminations bear similarities with those of the ninth-century Lorsch Gospels, particularly the Christ in Majesty which is copied from a Carolingian model. It is closely related to the contemporaneous Petershausen Sacramentary, which borrows from the Gero Codex's Christ in Majesty and Ecclesia (personification of the church), and the Hornbach Sacramentary, which was probably produced at the same scriptorium.

It is held at University and State Library Darmstadt (Cod. 1948).

== Gallery ==
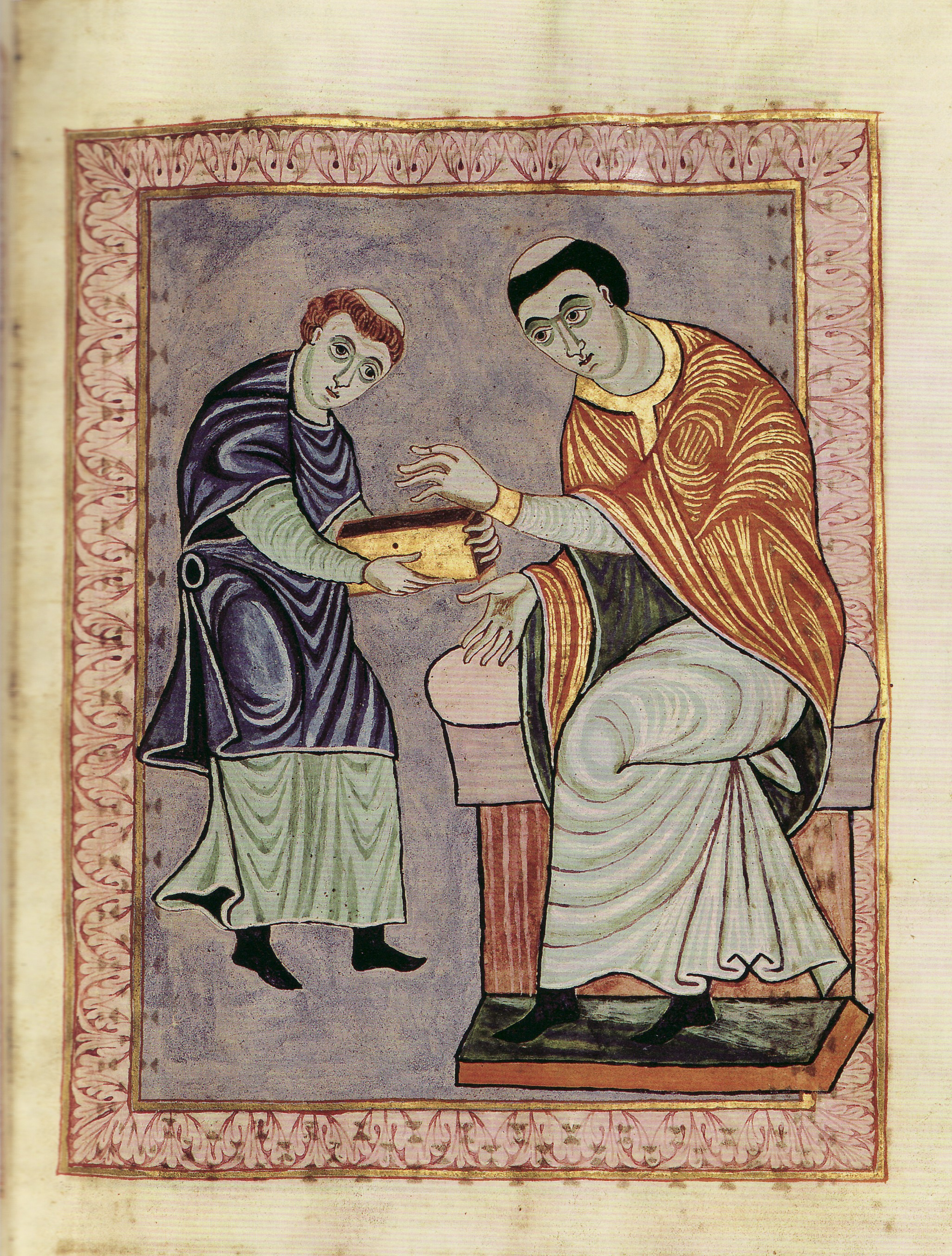
Dedicatory miniature of Anno and Gero, folio 7v

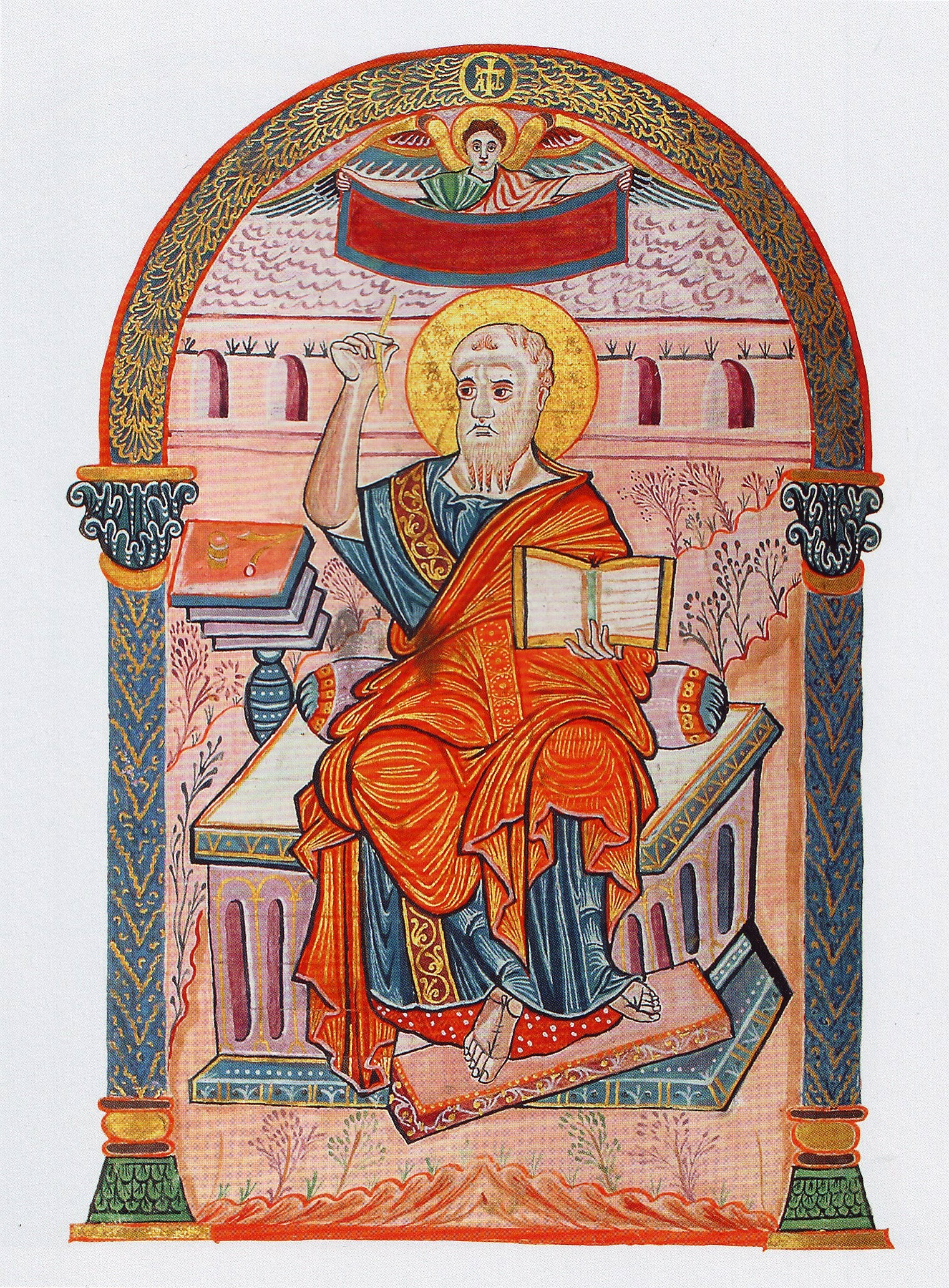
Matthew

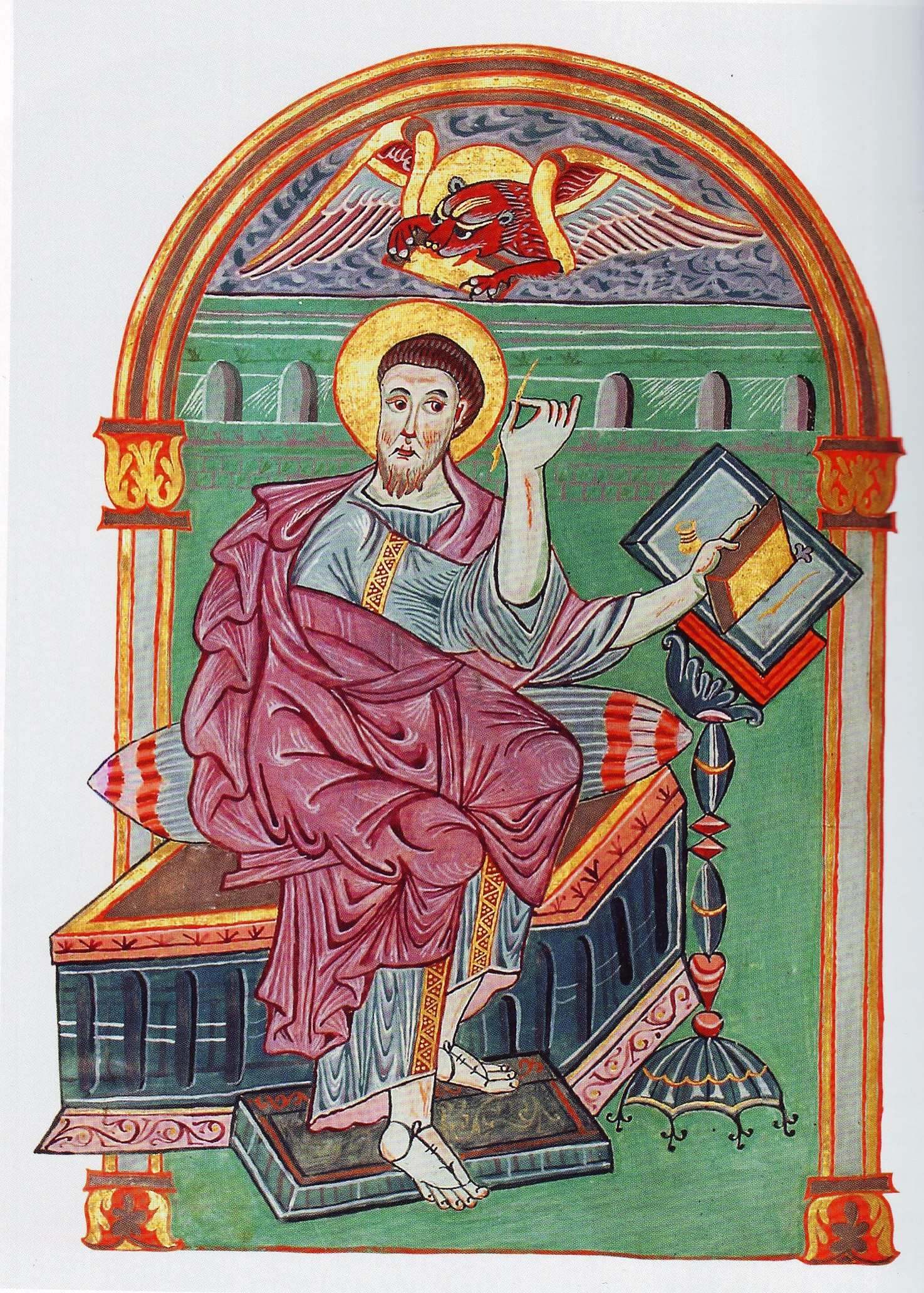
Mark

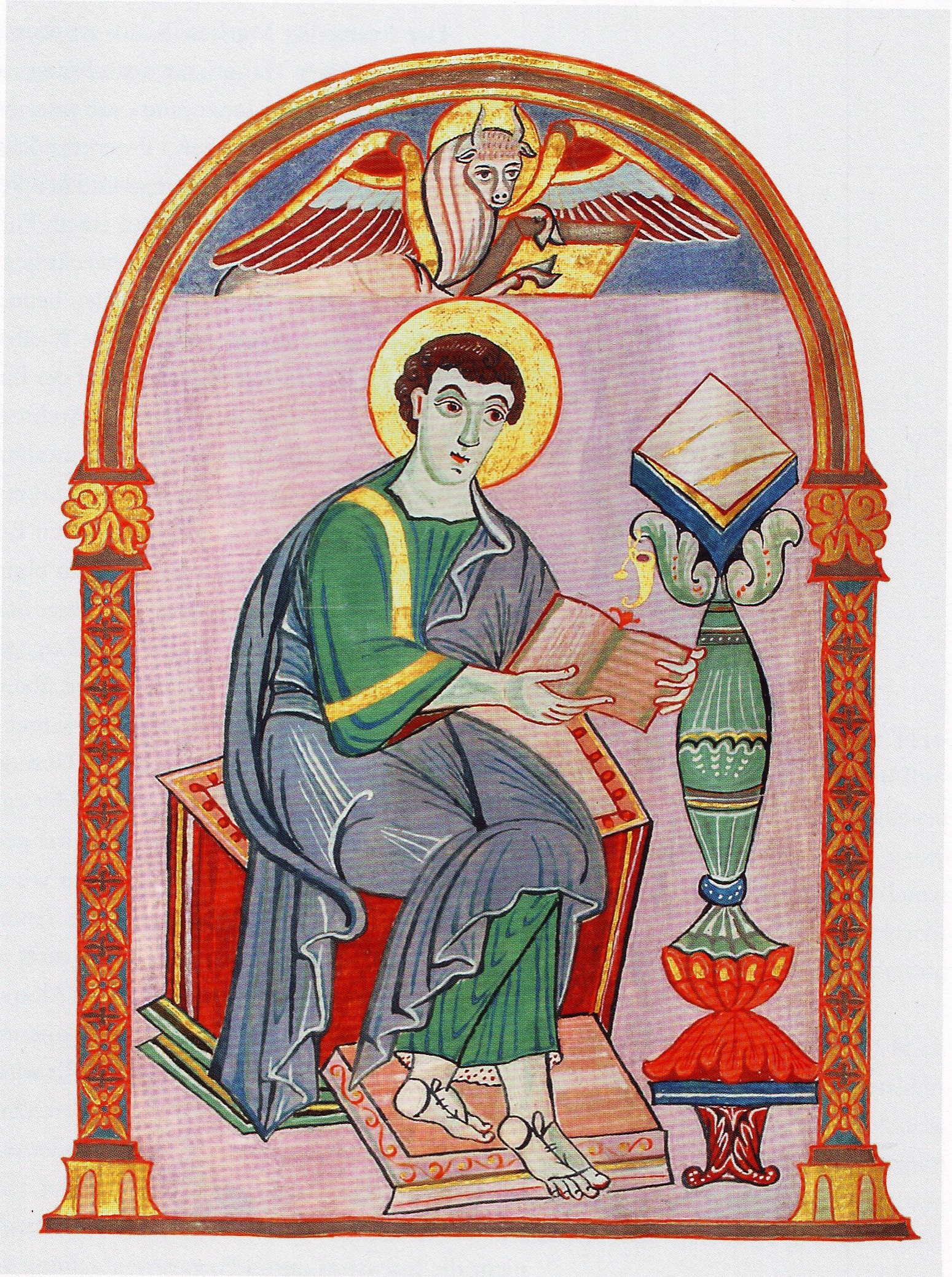
Luke

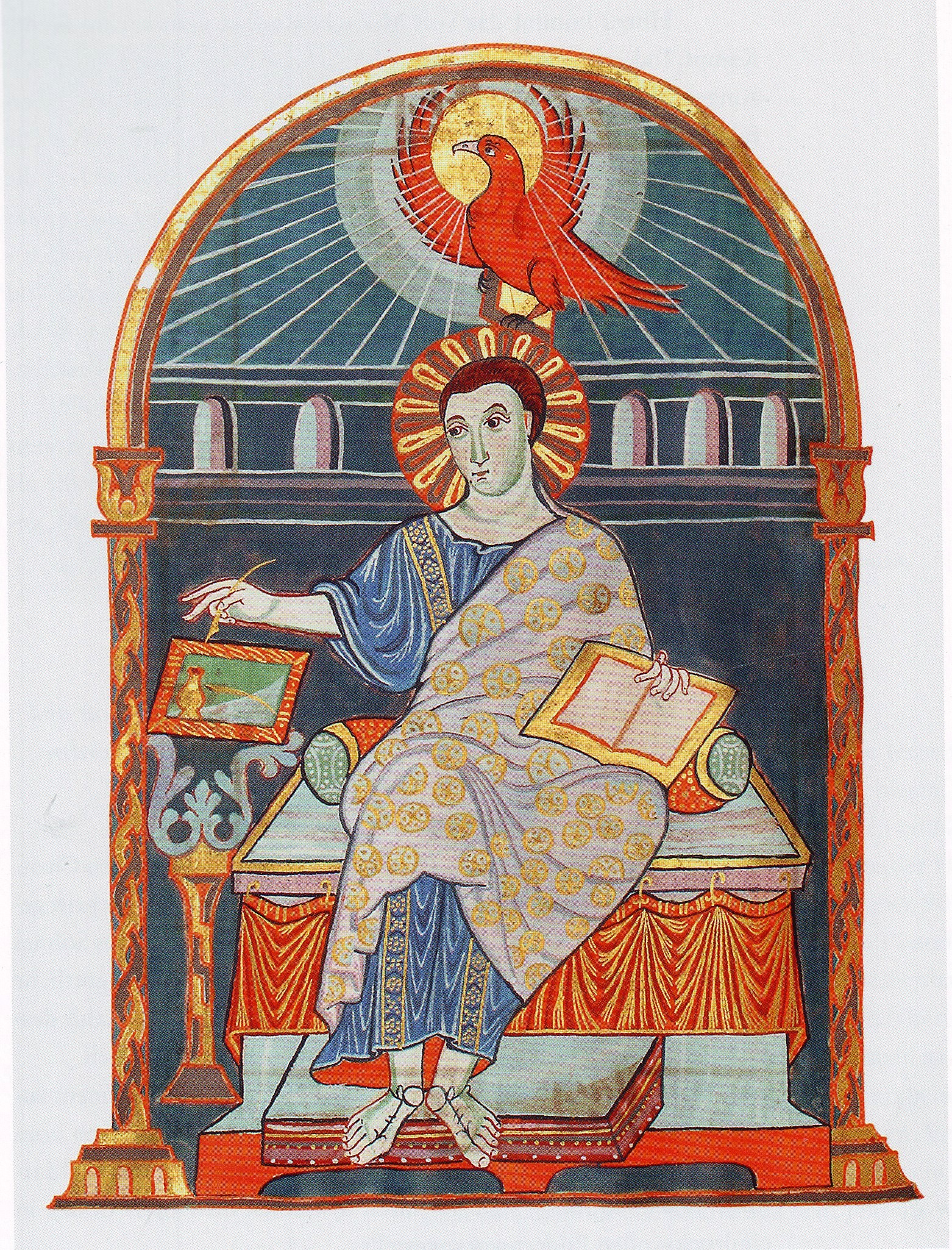
John

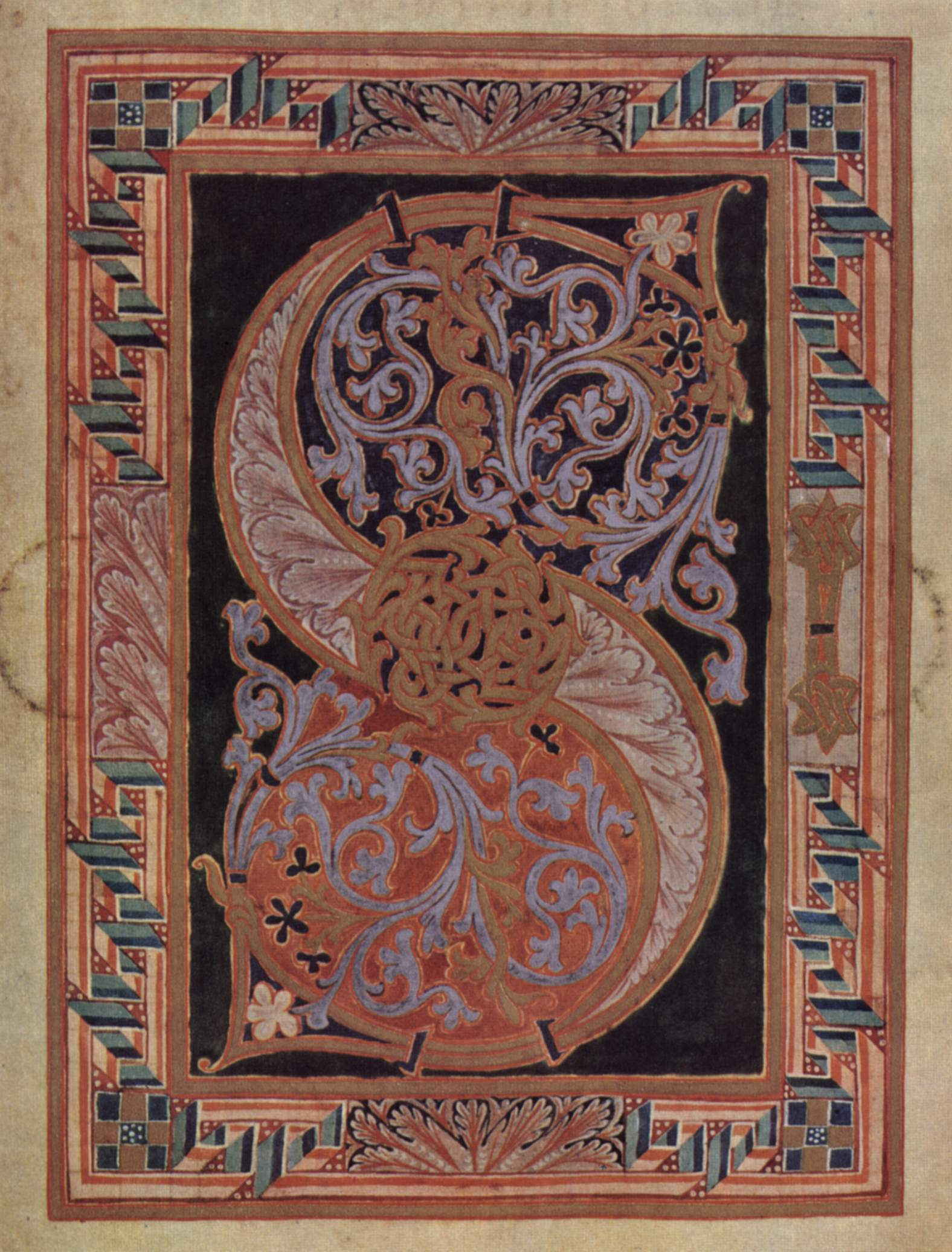
An initial "S"

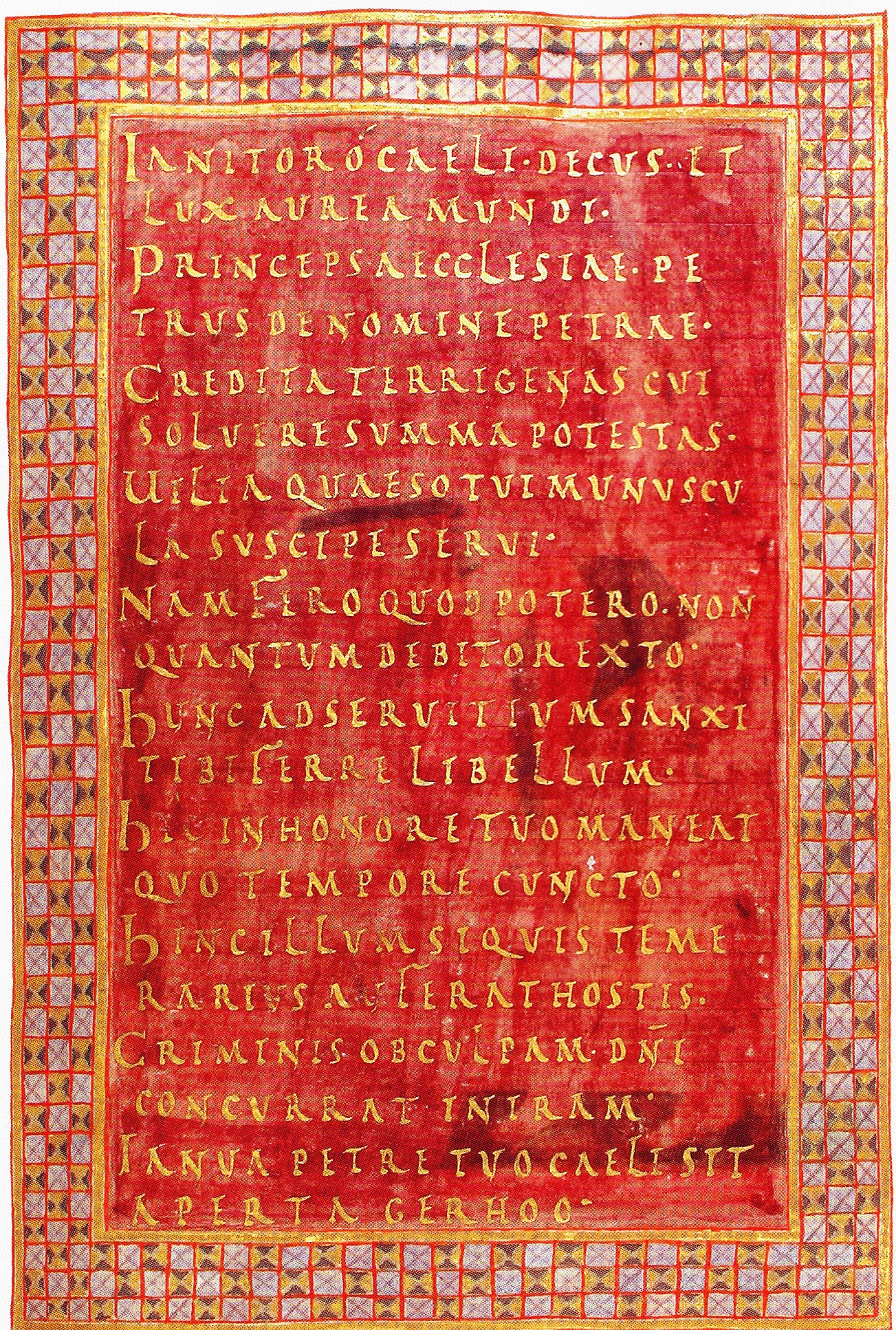

== Bibliography ==
- Dodwell, Charles Reginald (1993). The Pictorial Arts of the West, 800-1200. Yale University Press. pp. 134–. ISBN 978-0-300-06493-3.
- (in German) Michael Gosmann, Peter Michael Kleine, Kathrin Ueberholz: Der Gero-Codex kehrt zurück. Das gemalte Buch von Wedinghausen. Dokumentationsband über die Ausstellung des Gero-Codex im Kloster Wedinghausen vom 24. Oktober 2009 bis 17. Januar 2010. Stadtarchiv, Arnsberg 2010, ISBN 978-3-928394-26-0
