= Christian of Thuringia =

Saxon Count

Christian (died c. 950) was count in the Saxon Nordthüringgau and Schwabengau from 937. He also ruled in the neighbouring Gau Serimunt of the Marca Geronis from 945.

Like Margrave Gero the Great (c. 900 – 965), he was probably a relative of the Billung dynasty. Christian was married to Gero's sister Hidda, a pious woman who died about 970 in Jerusalem during a pilgrimage. According to the Annalista Saxo he received estates in Serimunt from the hands of King Otto I for his services. He was buried beside Magdeburg Cathedral.

His first son Thietmar succeeded his father in Schwabengau und Serimunt; upon the death of his uncle Gero he received large parts of the Marca Geronis and became Margrave of Meissen in 976. Christian's second son Gero was Archbishop of Cologne from 969 to 976.
