= Adolf von Hüpsch =

German writer, collector and charlatan

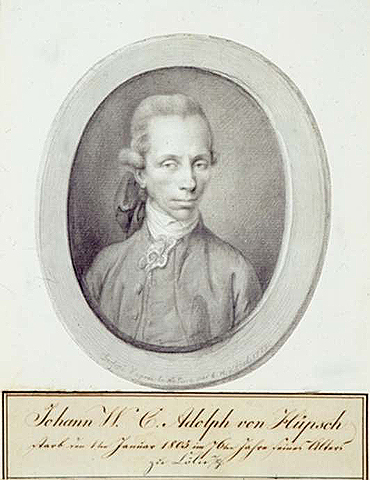
Chalk drawing by Emst Heinrich d'Abel, 1779

Johann Wilhelm Carl Adolph von Honvlez-Ardenn Hüpsch Lontzen or Baron Hupsch (31 August 1730 – 1 January 1805) was a German writer, collector and charlatan who titled himself as a baron. He was an indiscriminate collector of objects including those of natural history specimens, art, clothing, weaponry and antiquities. He also claimed to have invented a machine to destroy ants and control other insects in 1777.

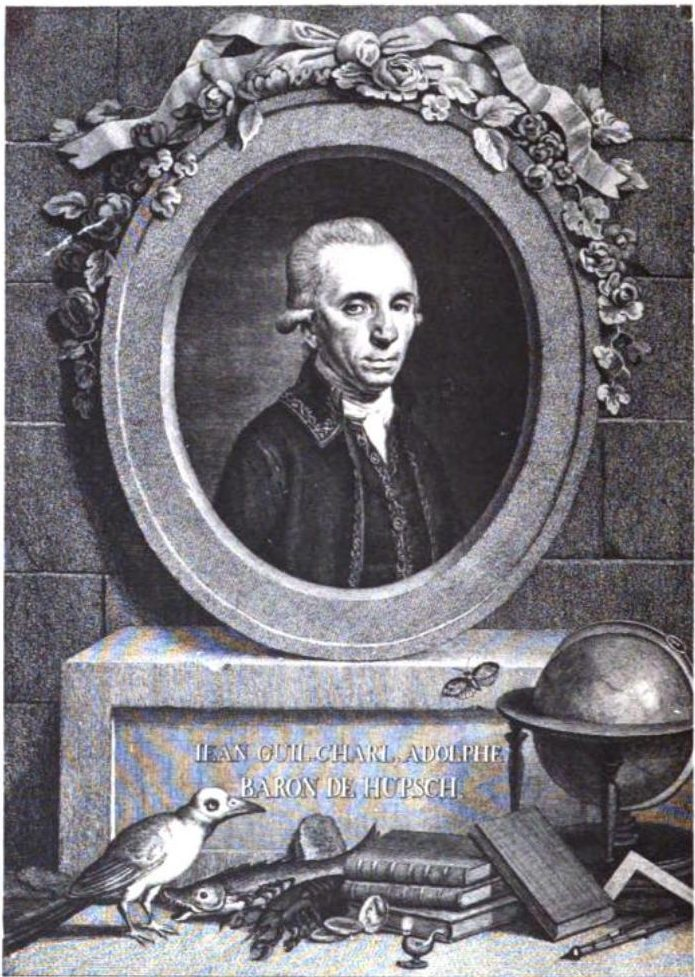

Hüpsch was born Jean Guilleaume Fiacre, the son of a court official Gerard Honvlez (d. 1746) and Anna Maria Kesler in Vielsalm (now in Belgium). He studied at the Marianum in Aachen and the Tricoronatum Gymnasium in Cologne (1749–50) before studying law, medicine, and natural sciences in Cologne. In 1755 he took the title and surname from his grandmother von Hupsch from Lontzen. He published various books on geophenomenology (1764), natural history of lower Germany (1781) and on ancient inscriptions in 1801. He gradually enhanced his name and titles and called himself Johann Wilhelm Carl Adolph Freiherr von Hüpsch, Herr zu Lotzen, zu Krickelhausen und auf der Motte claiming a pedigree back to the Roman family of Aemilianus. He made money selling patent medicines and from 1768 lived in the Lützeroder farm. He filled his home with collections and his housekeeper Mechtild Happertz (1725–1805) gave tours of his cabinet to visitors. In his will, he appointed the collector Ludwig X, Landgrave of Hesse-Darmstadt as his heir. Ludwig had purchased the mineral collection of Hüpsch in 1802. Many of his collections are now in the Hessisches Landesmuseum Darmstadt.

In 1775 Hüpsch was elected an honorary member of the Bavarian Academy of Sciences and in 1790 to the American Academy of Arts and Sciences.
