= Gero (archbishop of Cologne) =

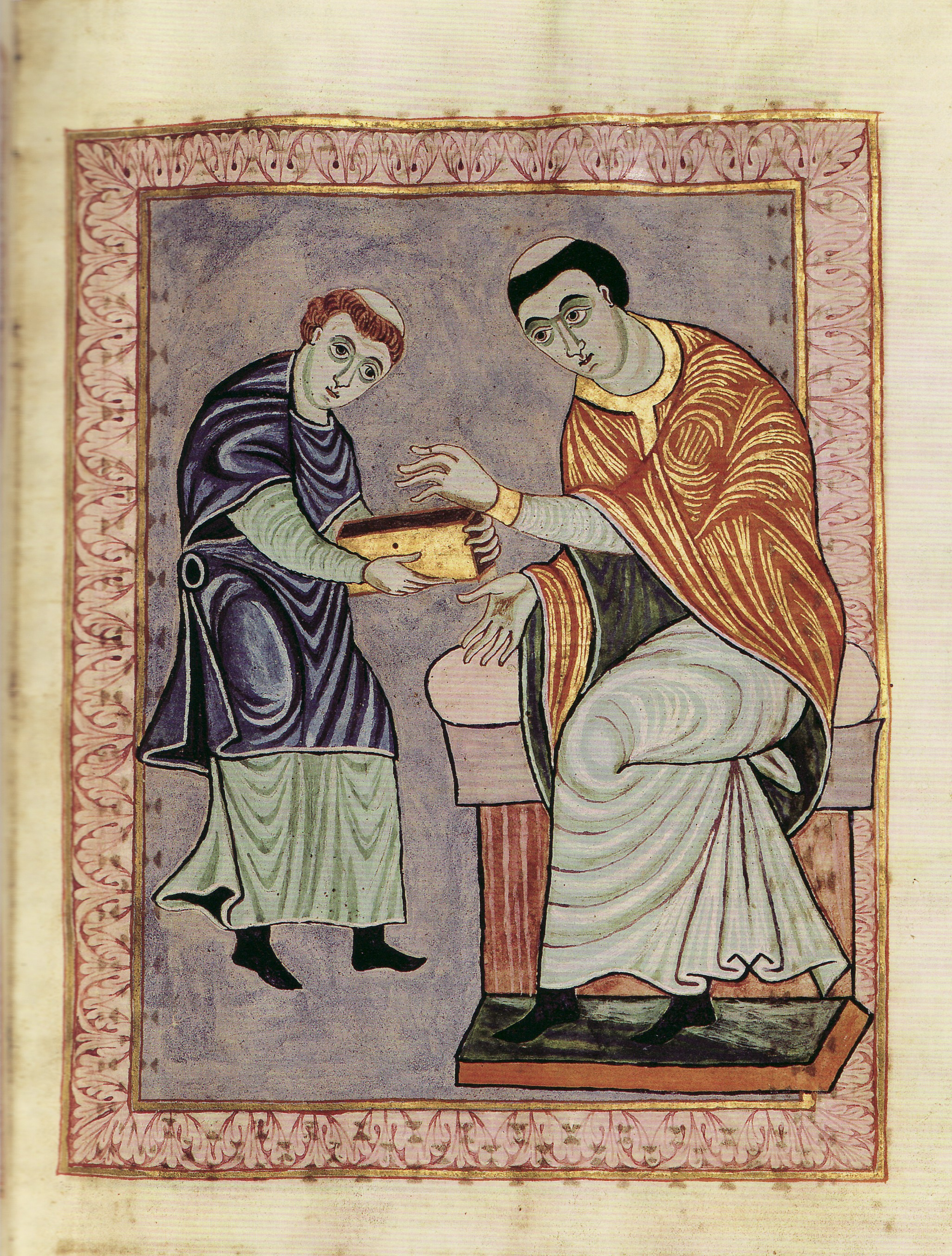
Gero (r.) receives the Gero Codex, Reichenau Abbey, c. 969

Gero (c. 900 – 29 June 976) was Archbishop of Cologne from 969 until his death.

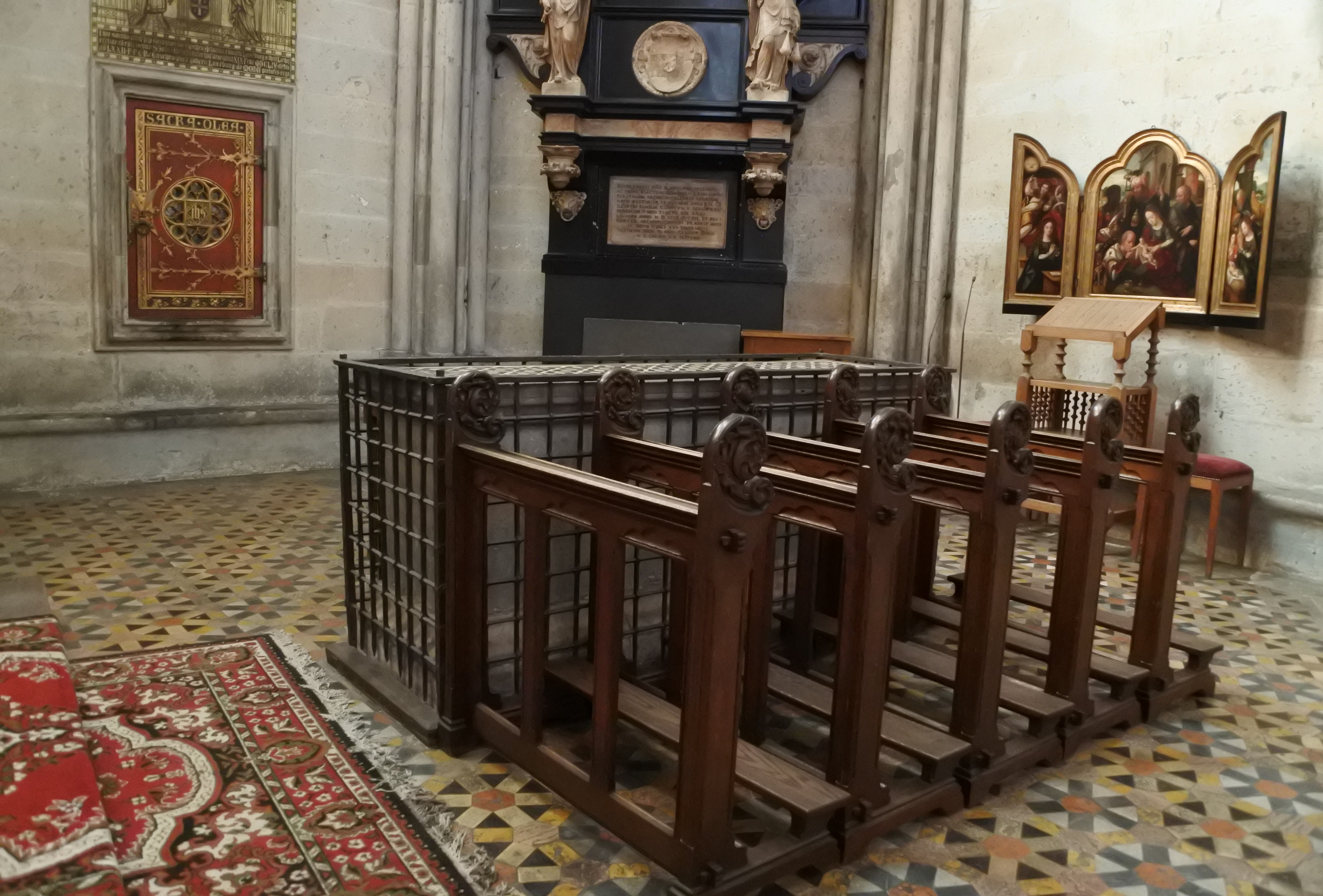
Tomb of Archbishop Gero at the Cologne Cathedral (centre, next to the wooden kneelers)

Gero originated from Saxony, probably a son of the Billung count Christian (d. 950), who ruled in the Eastphalian Nordthüringgau and Schwabengau as well as over the adjacent lands of Serimunt in the Marca Geronis. He and his brother Margrave Thietmar of Meissen were the sons of Christian's marriage with Hidda, sister of Margrave Gero the Great.

In 969, Gero was elected Archbishop of Cologne by the cathedral chapter. According to the medieval chronicler Bishop Thietmar of Merseburg, he at first met with opposition from the Emperor Otto the Great. In late 971, he was an ambassador to the Byzantine court in Constantinople, in order to arrange the marriage of Otto's heir, Otto II, to the Byzantine princess Theophanu in April 972 in Rome. On that journey he also brought back some relics of Saint Pantaleon for the dedication of the new St. Pantaleon's Church in Cologne. In 972 he attended a synod at Ingelheim, and the next year was present at the emperor's funeral.

On 29 August 970, he and his brother Thietmar donated part of their inheritance for the foundation of a monastery at Thankmarsfelde. By 975 (probably in 971), this became a royal monastery and was moved (in 975) to Nienburg, a site in the founders' familial lands, where it would serve as a missionary base for work amongst the Polabian Slavs. In 974, Gero established the monastery of Gladbach at the site of a former church, which had been destroyed during the Hungarian incursions.

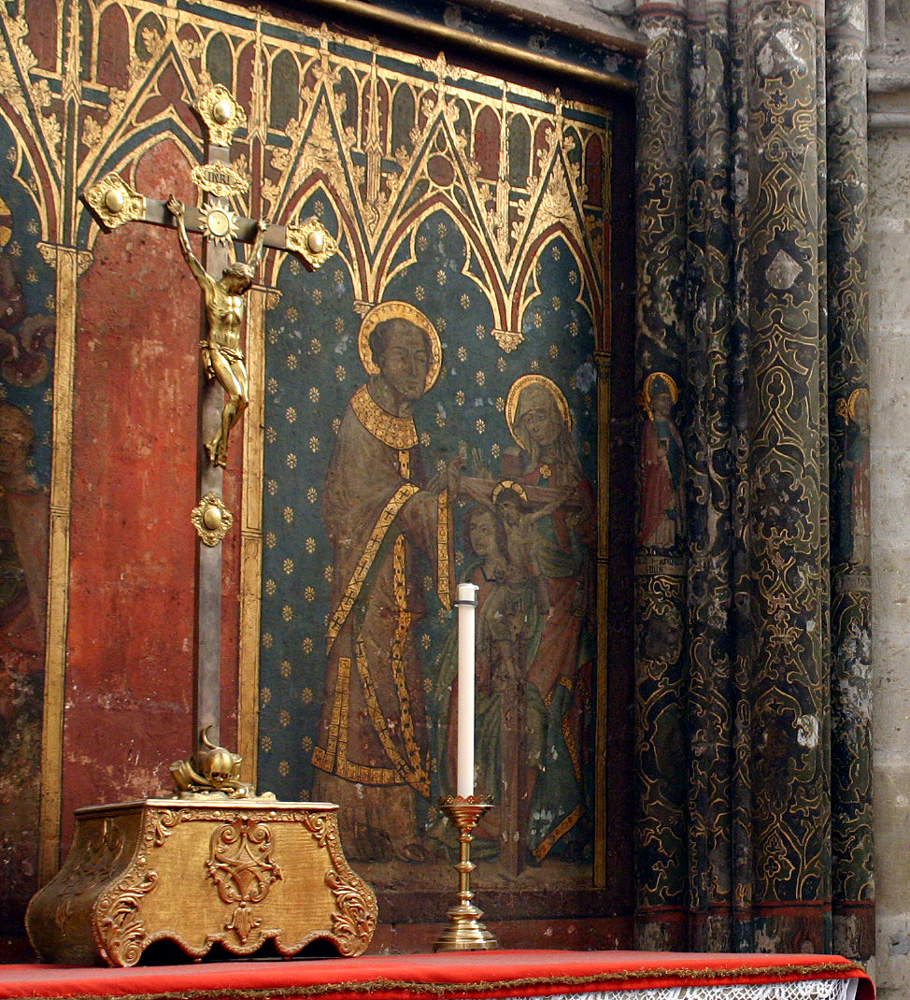
Gero depicted on the wall of Cologne Cathedral

Gero died in 976 and was buried in the Cathedral of Cologne, where he left as his legacy the Romanesque Gero Cross, one of the oldest large crucifixes in Germany and a milestone of Western Christian iconography.

The Gero Codex was probably drawn up in 969 at the behest of Archbishop Gero at the scriptorium of Reichenau Abbey. The pericope contains an evangeliary of the liturgical year to find a use in mass services. An excellent example of Ottonian art, it is today kept at the Darmstadt University of Technology and listed in UNESCO's Memory of the World Programme.

== Notes ==
Preceded by Volkmar	Archbishop of Cologne; 969–976	Succeeded by Warin
