= Schwabengau =

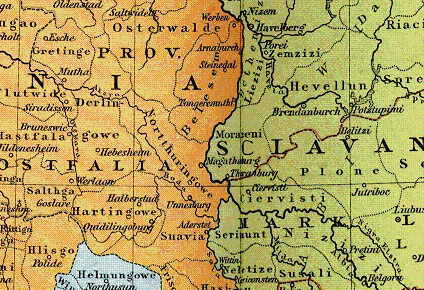
Suavia in eastern Saxony, about 1000

The Schwabengau (modernized name; originally: Suavia, Suevon) was an early medieval shire (Gau) in the Eastphalia region of the medieval Duchy of Saxony. Ruled by the House of Ascania, it became the nucleus of the later Principality of Anhalt, today part of the German state of Saxony-Anhalt.

== Geography ==
The Schwabengau comprised the northeastern Harz region, bordered by the River Bode in the north and west and by the River Saale in the east. The southern border is somewhat south of the River Wipper. Adjacent Saxon shires were: Nordthüringgau in the north, Harzgau with Quedlinburg in the west, as well as Friesenfeld and Hassegau in the south. In the southwest it bordered Helmegau in Thuringia; in the east on Serimunt beyond the Saale, in the Saxon Eastern March. Important settlements in Schwabengau included Aderstedt (Bernburg), Aschersleben, Ballenstedt, Hadmersleben, and Gröningen. Ecclesiastically, the territory belonged to the Roman Catholic Diocese of Halberstadt.

== History ==
The origin of the name the Schwabengau is somewhat mysterious as the region is located far northwards from the territory of the medieval Duchy of Swabia. There are two explanations. First, the name without doubt refers to the ancient Germanic Suebi tribe; since they were located in the Elbe area in the 1st century according to Tacitus' Germania, some of them must have stayed there, and the Schwabengau region was their last remainder. Second, people from Swabia colonized the area that once belonged to the Kingdom of the Thuringii and was conquered by the Frankish Empire in 532. The area was later incorporated into Frankish Austrasia and Swabian settlers entered the region under the reign of King Sigebert I from 561 to 575. Other nearby shires (Friesenfeld and Engelin) are also named after distant Germanic tribes.

In 927 the East Frankish king Henry the Fowler, Saxon duke since 912, installed his confidant Thietmar of Merseburg as count in the Schwabengau; upon his death he was succeeded by his son Siegfried in 932. Schwabengau was ruled by the Margraves of the Saxon Eastern March until the death of Thietmar II in 1030. Esico of Ballenstedt, the progenitor of the Ascanian dynasty, is first documented in 1036, holding large possessions in Schwabengau and adjacent Serimunt.

By the 12th century, the Saxon Schwabengau and neighbouring Serimunt had merged into the County of Ballenstedt, ruled by the Ascanian dynasty which originated in Aschersleben (Ascaria). Upon the deposition of Henry the Lion in 1180, Count Bernhard even assumed the Saxon ducal title. When the Ascanians divided their territories in 1212, the former Schwabengau became the western part of the newly founded state of Anhalt ruled by Duke Bernhard's elder son Henry I and named after Anhalt Castle near Harzgerode. The rough outline of Schwabengau could still be seen in the western borders of the Free State of Anhalt in the mid 20th century.

== Counts ==
Known counts of the Schwabengau include:

- Siegfried, Count of Merseburg (died 937)
- Christian of Thuringia (died 950)
- Thietmar, Margrave of Meissen (died c. 978)
- Rikdag (died 985), Margrave of Meissen from 979
- Charles, his son (died 1014), count in Schwabengau in 992
- Odo I, Margrave of the Saxon Ostmark (died 993)
- Gero II, Margrave of the Saxon Ostmark (died 1015)
- Thietmar, Margrave of the Saxon Ostmark (died 1030)
- Esico of Ballenstedt (died c. 1060), progenitor of the House of Ascania
