= Annalista Saxo =

Medieval German chronicler

The Annalista Saxo ("Saxon annalist") is the anonymous author of an important imperial chronicle, believed to have originated in the mid-12th century at Nienburg Abbey in the Duchy of Saxony.

== General ==
The chronicle of the "Annalista Saxo" is a collection of dates and facts about the medieval German monarchs (Kings of the Romans) and their Carolingian predecessors, beginning in the year 741 and continued until 1142.

The codex was created between 1148 and 1152. The anonymous author had more than 100 sources at his disposal, including some which no longer exist. The entries are arranged chronologically by year.

The identity of the chronicler, sometimes identified with Abbot Arnold of Nienburg (d. 1166), has not been conclusively established. The volume contains 237 parchment pages. The binding is from the 16th century. The book was restored in 1993. The cover is of brown cow's leather, the spine of vellum, and the content includes 16 ornamental initials.

The original of the "Annalista Saxo" is today in the Bibliothèque nationale de France in Paris. It is very fragile and is kept securely; a facsimile is on display. It is unknown how the volume came to be in France.

== Editions ==
- Naß, Klaus, ed. (1996). Die Reichschronik des Annalista Saxo und die sächsische Geschichtsschreibung im 12. Jahrhundert. Hannover: Hahnsche Buchhandlung.
- Naß, Klaus, ed. (2006) [1996]. Die Reichschronik des Annalista Saxo (2nd ed.). Hannover: Hahnsche Buchhandlung.
- Waitz, Georg, ed. (1844). "Annalista Saxo". Monumenta Germaniae Historica: Scriptores. Vol. 6. Hannoverae: Impensis Bibliopolii Aulici Hahniani. pp. 542–777.

== Exsternal links ==
- Georg Waitz, ed. Annalista Saxo, MGH Scriptores 6 (Hannover 1844) pp. 542-777.
