= Odo I of the Saxon Ostmark =

German noble and margarve (c.930–993)

Odo (or Hodo) I (also Huodo or Huoto) (c. 930 – 13 March 993) was margrave in the Saxon Eastern March of the Holy Roman Empire from 965 until his death.

Odo was, if the onomastics are correct, a son (or maybe a nephew) of Christian (d. 950), a Saxon count in the Nordthüringgau and Schwabengau of Eastphalia. Count Christian, probably a scion of the Billung dynasty, had married Hidda (d. 970), a sister of Gero, margrave of the vast marca Geronis in the lands settled by Polabian Slavs. From 945 he also ruled over the adjacent gau of Serimunt beyond the Saale river.

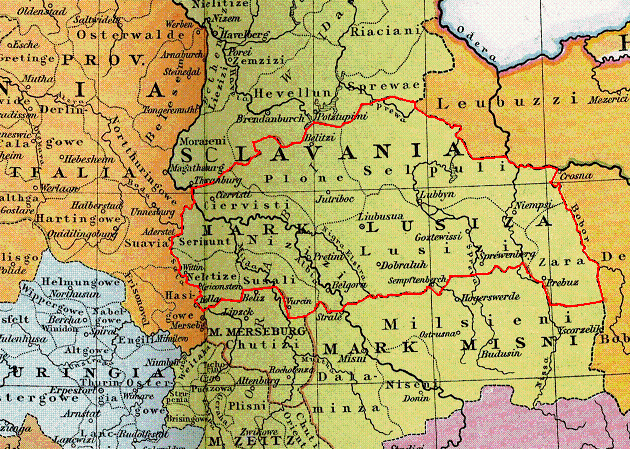
Odo's share (outlined) of the marca Geronis (green), 19th century reconstruction

In 965, Margrave Gero died and his great marca Geronis was divided into five smaller marches. Count Thietmar, a known son of Hidda, and Odo inherited large parts of his march: Odo received the so-called marca Orientalis or Eastern March, stretching from the Gau Serimunt in the west up to the remotest outposts on the Bóbr river in the east, while Thietmar appeared as margrave of southern Meissen after 970. Both are buried at Nienburg Abbey, a foundation of Thietmar and his brother Archbishop Gero of Cologne, which too provides evidence of their probable relationship. As a young man, Margrave Odo had shared the tutorship of Otto's son (later Otto II) with the boy's step-uncle William, Archbishop of Mainz. Archbishop William taught literature and culture; Margrave Odo taught war and legal customs.

Odo spent the first years of his rule subduing the Slavic tribes settling in the eastern parts of the Saxon Ostmark. He held comital rights in the gau of Nizizi, comprising the lands between the Mulde, Elbe and Black Elster rivers, and appeared with the title marchio (margrave) only in 974, though he had held further marcher territories (officially as a county) since 965. In that same year (974), Odo was made Count in the Saxon Nordthüringgau, still rivalling with Margrave Thietmar.

Odo is chiefly known for his quarrels with the Polish duke Mieszko I. The West Slavic Polans had established a state east of the Saxon marches and, aiming to advance into the Pomeranian lands north of the Warta river, had reached an agreement with late Margrave Gero and Emperor Otto I: Mieszko's ducal title was confirmed and the Polans paid a recurring tribute to the emperor, which was collected by Margrave Odo.

The medieval chronicler Thietmar of Merseburg, apparently quite gladly, relates that Odo's reputation with Mieszko was such that the duke of Poland "would not have dared while wearing his fur coat to enter a house where he knew the margrave to be, or to remain seated when the margrave stood up."

When in 972 the Polans again marched for the Baltic trade centre of Wolin, they entered into open conflict with Odo. The margrave, intending to compel Mieszko to pay tribute for the Pomeranian territory between the Oder and Warta rivers, invaded that region. Aged Emperor Otto, engaged in the marriage of his son Otto II with Princess Theophanu at far-off Rome, ordered them to cease until he himself could arbitrate their dispute.

However, Odo attacked Mieszko's forces and was defeated on 24 June at the Battle of Cedynia. The belligerents reconciled at the Imperial Diet in Quedlinburg one year later.

In 983, Odo took part in the attempts to suppress the Great Slav Rising of the Polabian Lutici tribes, but was not able to prevent the loss of the Saxon Northern March. He also failed to succeed Thietmar in the Margraviate of Meissen in 979.

Odo left a son, Siegfried (d. 1030), who became a monk at Nienburg, but left the monastery on his father's death to claim his inheritance. He did however not prevail against Thietmar's son Gero II, who became Margrave of the Saxon Ostmark in 993. Siegfried again appeared as a count from 1015, when he claimed the Saxon Ostmark from Gero's son Thietmar IV and allied with Duke Mieszko II of Poland in the German–Polish War. Thietmar IV prevailed with the support by Emperor Henry II, but lost the eastern parts of his march to Mieszko II in the 1018 Peace of Bautzen.

== Notes ==
=== Sources ===
- Reuter, Timothy (1991). Germany in the Early Middle Ages 800–1056. New York: Longman.
- Thompson, James Westfall (1928). Feudal Germany. Vol. II. New York: Frederick Ungar Publishing Co.

Preceded by Gero	Margrave of the Ostmark; 965–993	Succeeded by Gero II
