= Thietmar, Margrave of Meissen =

Thietmar
- Margrave of Meissen
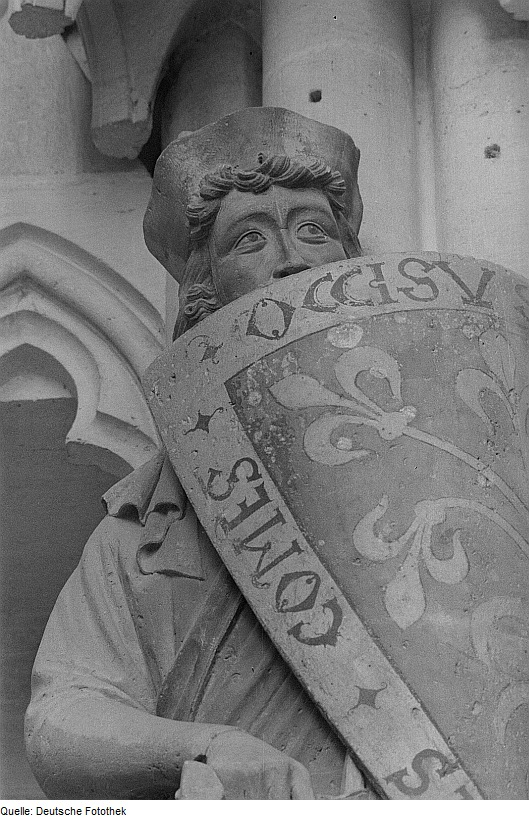
- Donor portrait in Naumburg Cathedral
- Reign: 976–979
- Born: c. 945
- Died: 3 August 979
- Buried: Nienburg Abbey
- Spouse: Suanhilde of Billung
- Issue: Gero II, Margrave of the Saxon Ostmark
- Father: Christian of Thuringia
- Mother: Hidda of Merseburg

Thietmar (II) (c. 945 – 3 August 979) was Margrave of Meissen from about 976 until his death.

== Life ==
Thietmar was the eldest of three brothers, all sons of Margrave Christian, count in the Saxon Eastern March, and his wife Hidda, sister of Margrave Gero the Great. His brothers were Archbishop Gero of Cologne and Margrave Odo of the Saxon Ostmark.

Thietmar strengthened the ties with the mighty Billung dynasty by marrying Swanehilde (d. 1014), daughter of Margrave Hermann Billung, acting Duke of Saxony from 961. The couple had one son: Gero II, who in 993 would succeed Thietmar's brother, Odo, as Margrave of the Saxon Eastern March.

In 951, he was first recorded when he succeeded his father as margrave in the Gau Serimunt. Between 951 and 978, he was also count in the Saxon Schwabengau. After the death of his uncle Gero the Great in 965, Thietmar inherited large parts of whose vast Marca Geronis and upon the death of Margrave Wigbert (before 976) received the Margraviate of Meissen from the hands of Emperor Otto II.

On 29 August 970, Margrave Thietmar and his brother Gero of Cologne founded the abbey of Thankmarsfelde, which between 971 and 975 became a royal monastery. It was moved to Nienburg at the confluence of the Saale and Bode rivers in 975. In the years which followed, Thietmar and Gero made further donations of land to the monastery, where Thietmar is also buried.

Thietmar was succeeded by the Schwabengau count Rikdag. His widow Swanehilde married Rikdag's successor Margrave Eckard I of Meissen.

== Notes ==
=== Sources ===
- Bernhardt, John W. (1993). Itinerant Kingship and Royal Monasteries in Early Medieval Germany, c. 936–1075. Cambridge: Cambridge University Press. ISBN 9780521521833.

Thietmar, Margrave of Meissen Born: c. 925 Died: 3 August 979
Preceded by Wigbert	Margrave of Meissen; 976–979	Succeeded by Rikdag
