= Nienburg Abbey =

Coordinates: 51°50′11″N 11°46′18″E

- Interactive map of Nienburg Abbey

Monastery information
- Order: Benedictine
- Established: 970 (in Thankmarsfelde) transferred in 975

Site
- Location: Nienburg

Nienburg Abbey (German: Kloster Nienburg) was a Benedictine monastery in Nienburg in Saxony-Anhalt, Germany.

== History ==
=== Abbey ===
Nienburg was for centuries on the extreme eastern edge of the settled territory of Germany. With the aim of converting the then Sorbian population of the region to Christianity, the Benedictine abbey that had been founded in 970 in Thankmarsfelde in the Harz Mountains was transferred in 975 to the fortress of Nienburg, originally built by order of Charlemagne. The construction work necessary to convert the building took over 30 years and the newly built abbey church, which is still extant, was eventually dedicated on 8 August 1004 in the presence of Emperor Henry II, who was at the time waging war against the Poles. At the same time the town of Nienburg received the rights of holding a market and of minting coins.

The abbey was declared a Reichskloster by Emperor Otto II and soon became one of the wealthiest monasteries of the region. It owned many estates and villages (including Harzgerode, Niemitsch and Lübben), but they were isolated and scattered between the Harz and the Lausitzer Neisse, and the last threat against the possessions of Nienburg Abbey from rebellious Sorbs was as late as 1115.

In Nienburg Abbey in about 1150 the imperial chronicle of the Annalista Saxo was written.

In the second half of the 12th century the abbey was involved in a regional power struggle in which it eventually lost its independence and in 1166 became a possession of the Archbishops of Magdeburg.

=== Castle ===
As a consequence of the Reformation and the German Peasants' War the abbey was handed over in 1563 to the Princes of Anhalt, who converted the conventual buildings between 1680 and 1690 for use as a castle for the use of their widows.

=== Factory ===
In 1871 the castle was sold to an industrialist, who converted the building for use as a malt factory. In 1996 parts of the building were destroyed by a fire caused by children playing about.

== Church ==
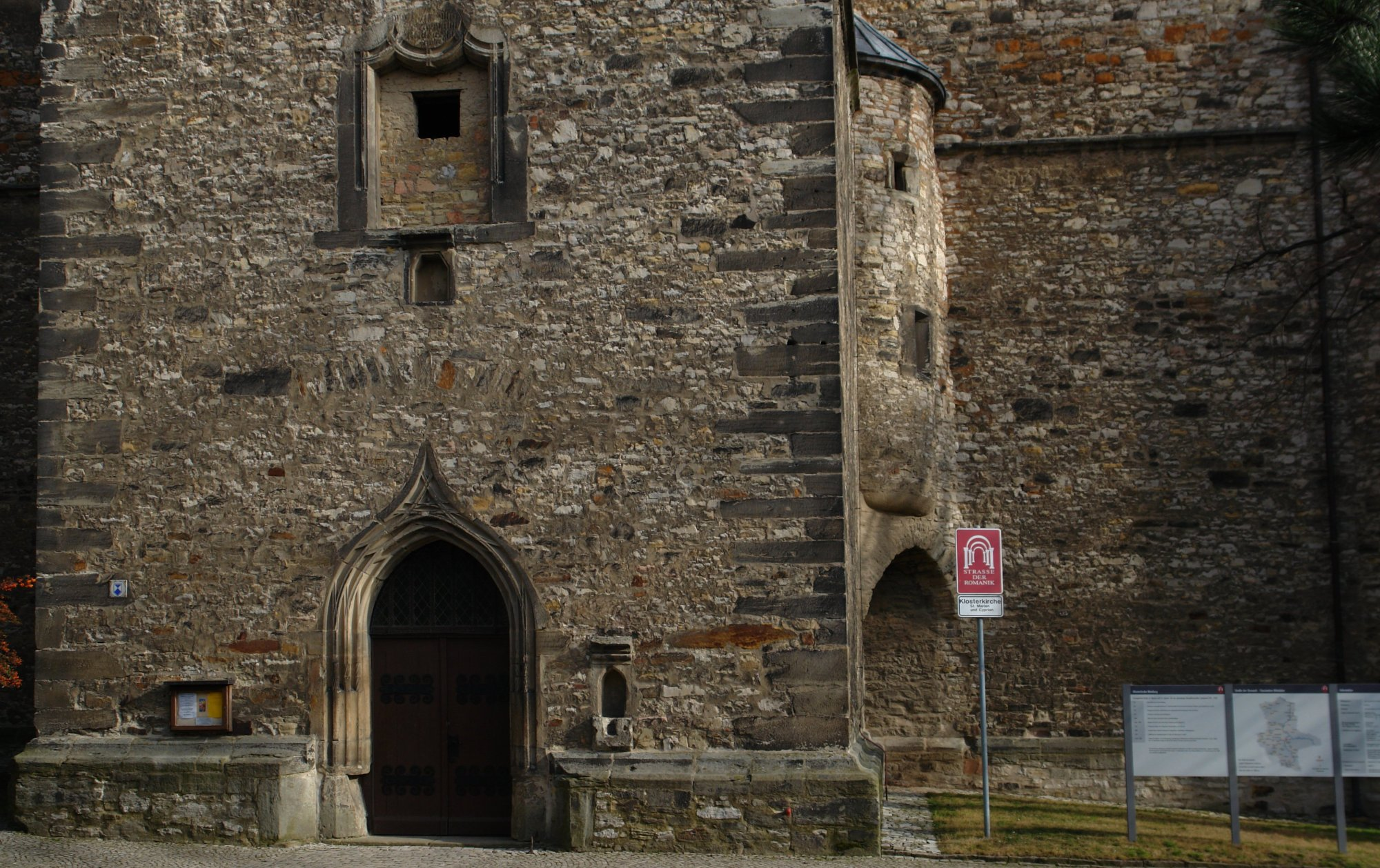
Church portal

The well-preserved 1000-year-old abbey church of Saint Mary and Saint Cyprian, dedicated in 1004, is one of the most significant early Gothic in central Germany. It belongs to the Evangelische Landeskirche Anhalts and is used ecumenically.

== Burials ==
- Gero II, Margrave of the Saxon Ostmark
- Thietmar, Margrave of Meissen
- Bernhard III, Prince of Anhalt-Bernburg
