= Saint Cyriakus, Gernrode =

Saint Cyriakus
- Stiftskirche St. Cyriakus
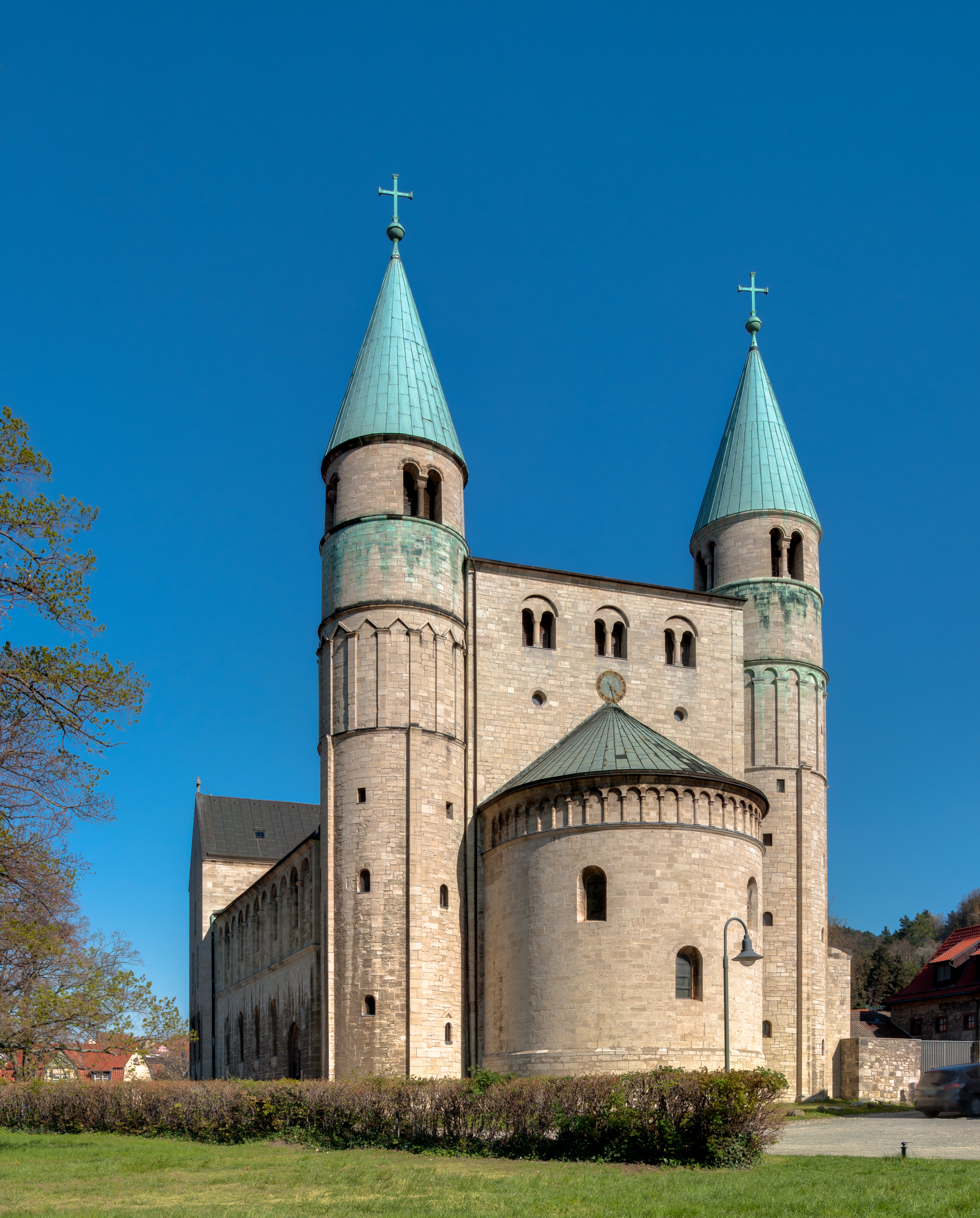
- Saint Cyriakus

- Location within Saxony-Anhalt Location within Germany
- 51°43′28″N 11°08′10″E
- Denomination: Lutheran
- Website: stiftskirche-gernrode.de

History
- Dedication: Cyriacus

Architecture
- Style: Ottonian/ Romanesque
- Groundbreaking: c. 959/960
- Completed: 1014

Administration
- Province: Evangelical Church in Central Germany

Saint Cyriakus (German: Stiftskirche St. Cyriakus, pronounced [ˈʃtɪftsˌkɪʁçə zaŋkt tsyˈʁi̯aːkʊs]) is a medieval church in Gernrode, Saxony-Anhalt, Germany. It is one of the few surviving examples of Ottonian architecture, built in 959/960–965 by Margrave Gero, although it was restored in the 19th century. From its foundation until 1614, Saint Cyriakus was the collegiate church of the Abbey of Gernrode, also founded by Margrave Gero. The church and the abbey became Protestant in the mid-sixteenth century, and the church is now used by the Protestant community of Gernrode.

The church is part of the tourist route "Romanesque Road", as it is an important example of an Ottonian church which inspired later, fully Romanesque, churches and cathedrals.

== History ==
Gero (d. 965) was a follower of Otto I from one of the most powerful families of eastern Saxony. In 937, Otto made Gero Margrave of the Eastern March. Gero, who owned a castle at Gernrode, decided to found a collegiate church and female (lay) convent (Stift) here, in cooperation with his son Siegfried. Construction on the crypt, the eastern apse and the convent started in 959. In 961, the foundation was awarded royal protection. In 963, Pope John XII issued a privilege, which removed the convent from the influence of the Bishop of Halberstadt. Siegfried had died heirless in 959. After Siegfried's death, his widow Hathui had become abbess of the convent. Gero returned from a trip to Rome with a valuable relic of Saint Cyriacus and the church was dedicated to this saint in 963. In 965, Gero died and was buried in front of the already finished eastern choir. A hiatus in construction followed Gero's death and is seen as the likely source of the shift in the church's axis (see map). Hathui ruled the convent for 55 years until her death in 1014.

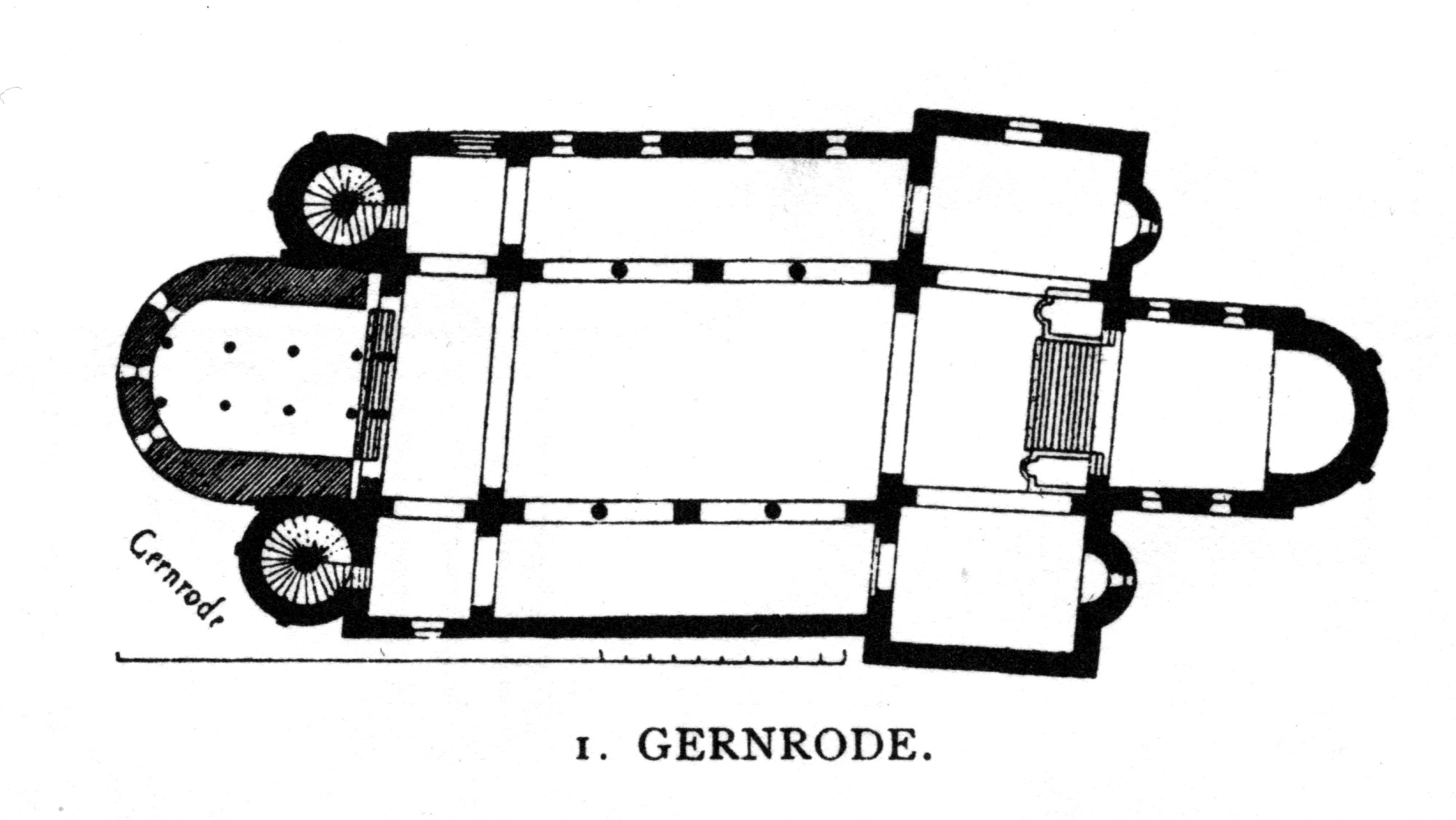
Plan of the church showing the shift in axis between the eastern and western parts

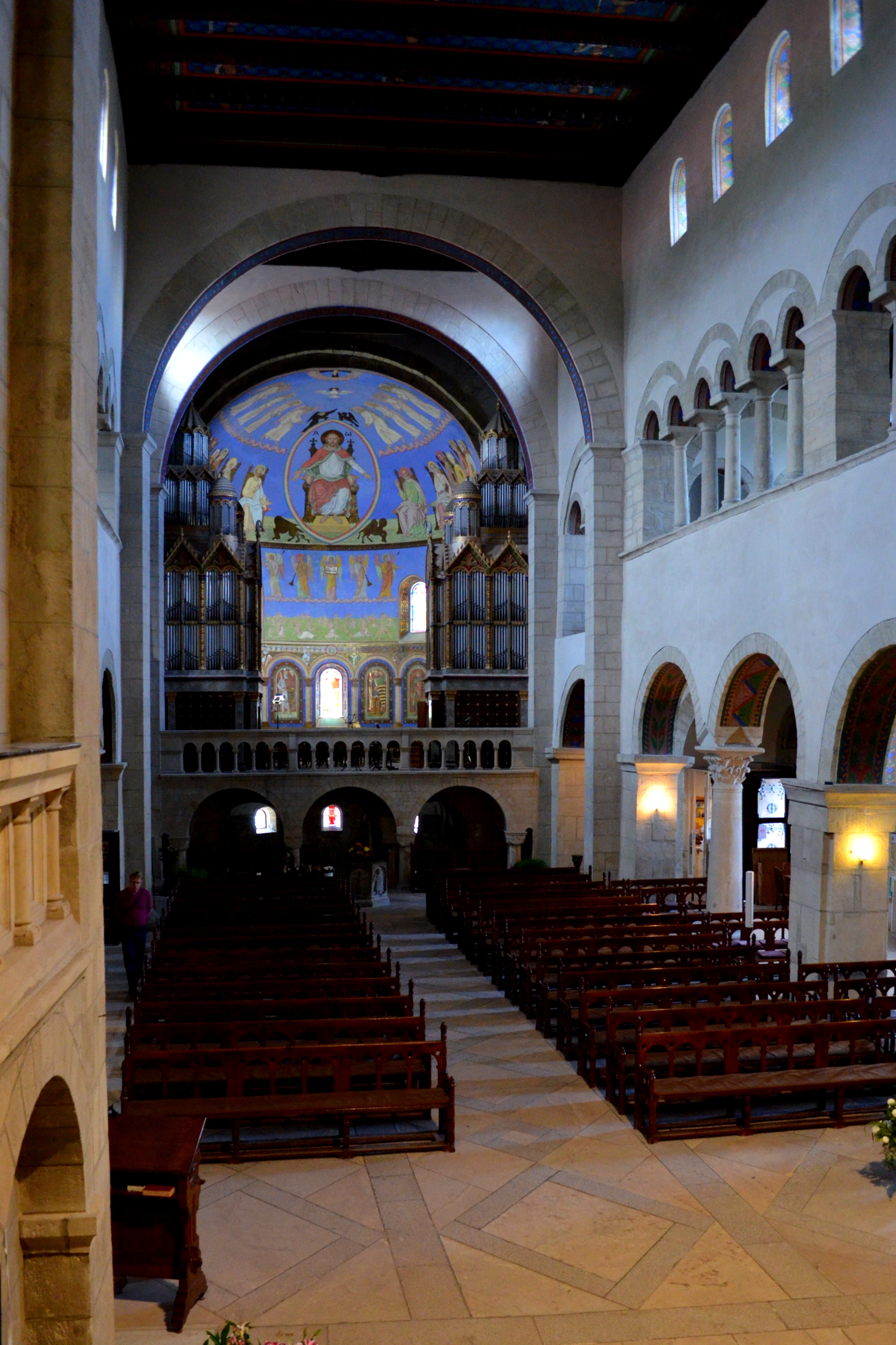
View of the interior

In 999, Emperor Otto III granted the convent Imperial status and in 1004, Empress Kunigunde, wife of Emperor Heinrich II visited the convent. The first stage of construction ended in 1014. That same year, on Hathui's death, Adelheid, daughter of Emperor Otto II succeeded her as abbess. Adelheid held that position until 1044.

Additions to the church in the 11th and 12th centuries include the west crypt (first mentioned in 1149), side galleries, the enlargement of the westwork (1127–1150) and the towers and the two-storey cloisters (1170). In 1188, Emperor Friedrich I Barbarossa held court at Gernrode and gifted the "Barbarossa Bell."

The vaults of the transept were added in the Gothic period.

The last Catholic abbess was Scholastika von Anhalt Dessau (1469–1504). Her successor, Elisabeth von Weida (1504–1576) introduced Reformation in 1521. In 1525, Elisabeth managed to prevent damage to the convent during the German Peasants' War. With its introduction into the Landeskirche, the convent lost its independence and fell under the influence of the local princes.

Abbess Anna von Plauen (1532–1549) founded the first school and supported the convent's role in providing medical care. From 1533, the collegiate church was shared with the parish. When Gernrode was awarded the status of town in 1539, the abbess donated a coat of arms.

The last Stiftsdame (and by default abbess), Sophie Elisabeth, left the abbey in 1614. In 1619, the abbey became a secular domain of the prince. Medieval works of art were removed, the buildings fell into disrepair and parts of the church were used for agriculture.

In 1669, Friedrich von Harzgerode purchased the town and the church. Renovations were carried out in 1754–1756. In 1806, with the end of the Holy Roman Empire, the convent finally lost its Imperial status and immunity and was subsumed by the Duchy of Anhalt-Bernburg. Over the following decades, the convent fell into ruin, the inventory was auctioned off until the purchase, in 1832, by Amtmann Henneberg. He secularized the church and converted the convent into a farming estate.

In the late 1830s, interest in the church and convent resurfaced, with art historian Franz Theodor Kugler publishing a description in 1838 and Ludwig Puttrich calling for its renovation in 1839. At the request of Duke Alexander Carl von Anhalt-Bernburg, architect Ferdinand von Quast then restored the church in 1859–1873.

Further work followed in 1907–1910, when the two towers of the west works were first removed and then rebuilt with strengthened foundations. Between 1960 and 1984, communist East Germany had the court and convent buildings restored. In 1984–1987, the church interior was renovated. Post reunification, in 1992, the roof was sheathed in copper. More work was done in 2003–2004 on the western apse and the Holy Sepulchre.

== Description ==
The central body of the church has a nave and two aisles, surrounded by the eastern transept and the westwork, which is sided by two towers. These elements, typical of the Carolingian architecture, were paired by novelties anticipating the Romanesque style: as the alternation of pillars and columns (a hallmark of numerous later churches in Saxony), the thick walls, the semi-blind arcades in galleries on the nave (similar to a triforium). The capitals of the columns show a variety of elements, with stylized leaves of acanthus and, in one case, human heads.

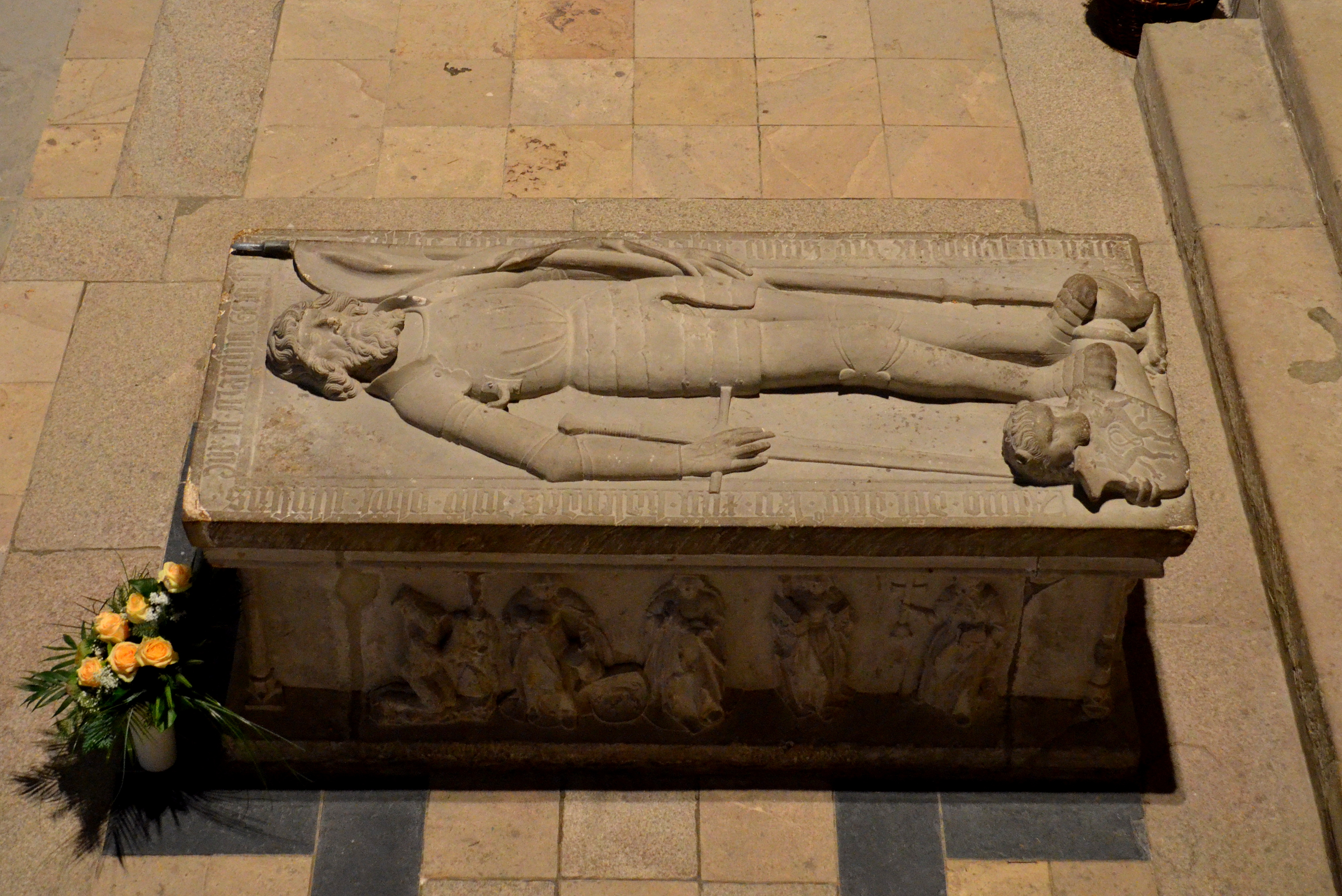
Tomb of Margrave Gero

The tomb of Margrave Gero sits in the crossing before the steps to the choir. It is covered by a sandstone slab, carved into Gero's likeness, showing him in armor with sword and a flag. A lion is at his feet.

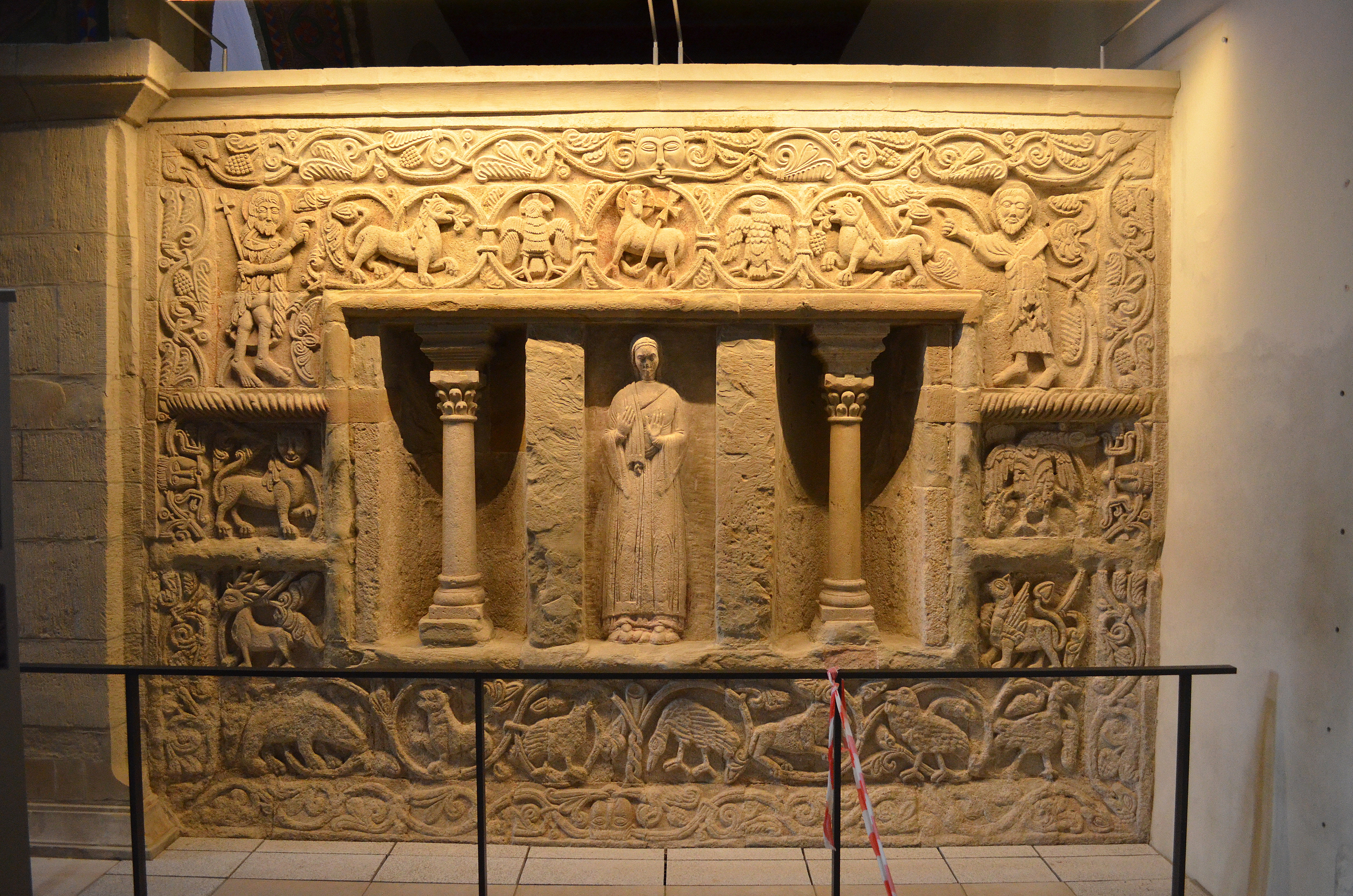
Relief on the western wall of the Holy Sepulchre with a figure of Mary Magdalene

The southern aisle houses a copy of the grave of Christ (a representation of the Holy Sepulchre in Jerusalem), most likely dating to the period 1080 to 1130. It is the oldest of its kind in Germany and also one of the most original, having little in common with the Holy Grave in Jerusalem. The entrance to the structure was moved from the usual east to the north side when the galleries were added in the 12th century. Parts of the outer decorations of the tomb were intentionally destroyed, but it is unclear whether this happened during the 12th-century reconstruction or in the final introduction of Reformation in 1616. The interior and exterior sculptures of the tomb are considered a masterwork of early Romanesque statuary art.

The baptismal font from around 1150 came from a demolished Romanesque church in Alsleben.

The painted ceilings were added during the 19th-century renovation which also lined most of the walls with cut stone panels - the original Ottonian walls featured rough quarry stone masonry.
