= Adelaide of Quedlinburg =

Adelaide of Quedlinburg may refer to:

- Adelaide I, Abbess of Quedlinburg (977–1044/5)
- Adelaide II, Abbess of Quedlinburg (1045–1096)
