= Michaelstein Abbey =

Monastery in Blankenburg, Landkreis Harz, Saxony-Anhalt, Germany

Coordinates: 51°48′22″N 10°54′51″E

Michaelstein Abbey (Kloster Michaelstein) is a former Cistercian monastery, now the home of the Stiftung Kloster Michaelstein - Musikinstitut für Aufführungspraxis ("Michaelstein Abbey Foundation - Music Institute for Performance"), near the town of Blankenburg in the Harz in Sachsen-Anhalt, Germany.

== History ==
In a deed of Emperor Otto I dated 956 giving property to Quedlinburg Abbey is mentioned the cave church dedicated to Saint Michael, also known as the Volkmarskeller (as it is still called) near the Eggeröder spring. The same deed also mentions the cell of the revered anchorite Liutbirg, which traditionally was held to have been sited in or near the cave church. The holiness of the site proved attractive, and a religious community formed round it.

In 1139 Beatrix II, abbess of Quedlinburg, founded a Cistercian monastery here, which was settled in 1146 by monks from Kamp Abbey. A few years later the new monastery was transferred away from the cave church to form Michaelstein Abbey on the present site. The abbey's growing property brought it great wealth, but it never settled any daughter houses of its own.

The monastery was sacked in 1525 by rebellious mobs during the German Peasants' War. The church was ruined beyond repair, and was never rebuilt; religious services were held from then on in the former chapter house. In 1533 the remaining buildings were ransacked and devastated by Wilhelm von Haugwitz. In 1543 the last Roman Catholic abbot resigned, and the abbey and its assets were passed into the hands of the Counts of Blankenburg, who acted as abbots. Under their rule the now Protestant community began a school in 1544.

After the death of the last count in 1599, Blankenburg and its possessions, including Michaelstein Abbey, came to the Duke of Brunswick, who appointed his brother Christian abbot of Michaelstein. He relinquished the position in 1624, after which the Dukes instead appointed Protestant theologians.

From 1629 to 1631 and from 1636 to 1640, during the Thirty Years' War, short-lived communities of Cistercian monks again occupied the monastery.

In 1690 Michaelstein passed into the possession of the Dukes of Brunswick-Lüneburg. Under abbot Eberhard Finen a seminary for Protestant preachers was established in 1717, which operated alongside the school until 1721, when the school was closed, leaving the abbey as a seminary and a Protestant men's collegiate foundation. At this period substantial building works were carried out, including the conversion of part of the west wing into a Baroque church.

In 1808, under French occupation, the abbey was closed down. Thereafter the buildings were used only for farming purposes, largely to accommodate farm workers, and so began many years of deterioration.

== Stiftung Kloster Michaelstein ==
In 1945, as part of the land reforms of the Communist government of East Germany, the abbey estates were split up and redistributed. Some Work on the abbeys buildings took place from 1956, but it was in 1968 that the main restoration scheme began, on the initiative of the Telemann Chamber Orchestra and its director Dr. Eitelfriedrich Thom. In 1977 was founded the culture and research facility that formed the basis of the later Institut für Aufführungspraxis der Musik des 18ten Jahrhunderts ("Institute for the Performance of the Music of the 18th Century").

In 1988 a museum was created, with a collection of predominantly historical musical instruments. In the same year a group was formed from among the musicians of the Telemann Chamber Orchestra who played historical musical instruments as the "Barockensemble des Telemann-Kammerorchesters".

In 1995, for lack of funds, the full Telemann Chamber Orchestra was wound up, but the Baroque Ensemble continued, playing on historical instruments, and took over the name of the Telemann Chamber Orchestra. In 1997 the Institute was changed into the Stiftung Kloster Michaelstein - Musikinstitut für Aufführungspraxis. From 2001 the Landesmusikakademie of Sachsen-Anhalt has also been based here.

From 2000 the orchestra was gradually separated from the Institute and urged towards independence. Some time afterwards there was a split between the musicians: one part continues to play on historical instruments as the "Telemannisches Collegium Musicum", while the other part, under the leadership of the widow of Dr. Eitelfriedrich Thom, continues under the old name as the "Telemann-Kammerorchester", but without any connection to Michaelstein Abbey.

The former monastic buildings, now accommodating both the Foundation (Stiftung) and the Sachsen-Anhalt Music Academy (Landesmusikakademie Sachsen-Anhalt), host various musical events, particularly the series of concerts known as the Michaelsteiner Klosterkonzerte, often featuring the Michaelstein Chamber Choir (Kammerchor Michaelstein) and the Telemanisches Collegium Michaelstein Orchestra. Guided tours of the abbey complex, including the herb- and vegetable gardens, laid out according to historical sources, and of the musical instrument display, are conducted throughout the year. A music library is located in the west wing, and is often accessible to the public. A highlight of the year is the annual Michaelstein Abbey Festival (Michaelsteiner Klosterfest).

In addition the Foundation organises conferences and seminars at a European level and supports ongoing research.

== Other structures ==
In the external wall of the Baroque church created in the west wing of the surviving monastery precinct, are immured the remains of Beatrice of Gandersheim (d. 1061), daughter of Henry III, Holy Roman Emperor, and abbess of Gandersheim and Quedlinburg. Formerly buried at Quedlinburg Abbey, Beatrice's remains were displaced after the church there burnt down in 1070, and were apparently finally laid to rest in Michaelstein in the 1160s.

The nearby Mönchemühle ("monks' mill") on the Goldbach brook was once the monastery's oil mill.

== Garden dreams ==
Michaelstein Abbey and Abbey Gardens are part of the Saxony-Anhalt Garden Dreams project.

== External links / Sources ==
- Kloster Michaelstein website (in German)
- history of the Abbey (in German)
- Kammerchor Michaelstein website (in German)
- www.telemann-michaelstein.de (in German)
- Telemann-Kammerorchester website (in German)
- Gesellschaft der Freunde Michaelstein e.V. (Friends of Michaelstein Abbey) (in German)
