= Beatrice I =

Beatrice I may refer to:

- Beatrice I, Abbess of Quedlinburg (1037–1061)
- Beatrice I, Countess of Burgundy (1143–1184)
