= Bruno of Verden =

Bruno of Verden may refer to:

- Bruno I (bishop of Verden) (r. 962–976)
- Bruno II (bishop of Verden) (r. 1034–1049)
