= Matilda, Abbess of Quedlinburg =

Princess-Abbess of Quedlinburg from 966 to 999

Matilda

Princess-Abbess of Quedlinburg
- Reign: 966–999
- Successor: Adelheid I
- Born: December 955
- Died: February 999 (aged 43); Quedlinburg Abbey
- Burial: Quedlinburg Abbey
- Dynasty: Ottonian
- Father: Otto I, Holy Roman Emperor
- Mother: Adelaide of Italy
- Religion: Roman Catholic

Matilda (December 955 – February 999), also known as Mathilda and Mathilde, was a German regent, and the first Princess-Abbess of Quedlinburg. She served as regent of Germany for her father and brother during his absence in 967, and as regent during the minority of her nephew from 984.

She was the daughter of Otto I, Holy Roman Emperor, and his second wife, Adelaide of Italy.

== Canoness ==
Her grandmother, Saint Matilda, had founded Quedlinburg Abbey in Germany as a house of secular canonesses in 936. In April 966, in a splendid ceremony requested by her father, the eleven-year-old granddaughter and namesake of the foundress was elected suae metropolitanae sibi haereditariae.

== Regency ==
A year after becoming abbess, Matilda was assigned as regent of the kingdom when her father and brother Otto went to Italy. As regent, Matilda held a reforming synod at Dornberg, concerning the church in Germany.

In 968, the monk Widukind of Corvey dedicated to Matilda his opus magnum Die Sachsengeschichte, in which he called her the mistress of all Europe. The book, that described the history of the Saxons' struggle against the Magyars up to the death of Otto I in 973, also served as a kind of manual for ruling, including advices on how to deal with deceit and betrayal.

In 984, she held an imperial diet at her abbey. At the diet, Henry the Wrangler questioned the right of Matilda's nephew to succeed his father. Matilda successfully defeated his claims and secured the election of her nephew as Holy Roman Emperor, therefore "holding the empire together". A contemporary chronicler described her regency as being "without female levity". Matilda succeeded in restoring peace and authority by leading an army against the "barbarians".

In 985, Wallhausen (now in Saxony-Anhalt) became her private property.

In 984, Matilda, her mother, Empress Adelaide, and her sister-in-law, Empress Theophanu, became co-regents for Matilda's young nephew, Otto III.

In 994, she secured market rights, as well as coinage and customs privileges from Otto III to Quedlinburg. From a few huts, Quedlinburg developed into a prosperous city.

In 997, as Otto III increasingly shifted his focus to Italy (she accompanied him there in his first trip), he handed over the rulership of Germany to her, overriding the authority of all bishops and dukes. In seven years, she was the only member of the dynasty to have a presence in Saxony.

In 998, she held a Diet (Hoftag) in Derenburg, heard requests and appointed offices.

In contemporary documents, she was called metropolitana ("overseer of bishops) and mattricia ("matriarch").

== Death ==
She died in February 999 and was succeeded as abbess of Quedlinburg by her niece, Adelaide I.

== Cultural depictions ==
- A poem from the end of the Ottonian era (on a reliquary of the confessor Marsus and the virgin Lugtrudis in Ottonian convent of Essen) and made under the Abbess Theophanu (died 1056) reads:

Hoc opus eximium gemmis auroque decorum
Mathildis vovit, Theophanu quod bene solvit
Regi dans regum Mathildt haec crysea dona
Abbatissa bona; quae rex deposcit in aevum
Spiritus Ottonis pauset caelestibus oris.

Matilda made a votive offering of this excellent work,
Beautiful in its jewels and gold, which Theophanu disposed of;
Good abbess Matilda, giving to the King of Kings these golden gifts,
Which the king everlastingly keeps asking for,
May the spirit of Otto tarry on the celestial shores.

- In 2013, Mitteldeutscher Rundfunk made the documentary Mathilde von Quedlinburg - Vom Mädchen zur Machtfrau (Matilda of Quedlinburg, from young girl to woman of power), or Geschichte Mitteldeutschlands - Mathilde. Die erste Äbtissin Quedlinburgs (Working title).

== Commemoration ==
In 1999, the 1000th Anniversary of her death was commemorated, especially in Quedlinburg with a colloquium and an exhibition.

== Sources and further reading ==
- Gerd Althoff: Gandersheim und Quedlinburg. Ottonische Frauenklöster als Herrschafts- und Überlieferungszentren. In: Frühmittelalterliche Studien, Jahrbuch des Instituts für Frühmittelalterforschung an der Universität Münster. Vol. 25, 1991, S. 123–144
- Gerd Althoff: Mathilde. In: Lexikon des Mittelalters. Band VI, Artemis & Winkler Verlag, München und Zürich, 1993, ISBN 3-7608-8906-9
- Eckhard Freise (1990). "Mathilde". Neue Deutsche Biographie (in German). Vol. 16. Berlin: Duncker & Humblot. pp. 376–378. (full text online).
- Karl Janicke (1884). "Mathilde, Aebtissin von Quedlinburg" . Allgemeine Deutsche Biographie (in German). Vol. 20. Leipzig: Duncker & Humblot. pp. 593–594.
- Gerlinde Schlenker: Äbtissin Mathilde : eine Quedlinburgerin als Reichverweserin vor 1000 Jahren. Stekovics, Halle an der Saale, 1999. ISBN 3-932863-14-3
- Christian Marlow: Augusta und „funkelnder Edelstein“ – Äbtissin Mathilde von Quedlinburg zum 1020. Todesjahr (999 –2019) In: Sachsen-Anhalt Journal 29 (2019), H. 3, S. 14–16
- Jestice, Phyllis G. (12 April 2018). Imperial Ladies of the Ottonian Dynasty: Women and Rule in Tenth-Century Germany. Springer. ISBN 978-3-319-77306-3.
- Jansen, Sharon L. (2002). The Monstrous Regiment of Women: Female Rulers in Early Modern Europe. Palgrave Macmillan.
- McNamara, Jo Ann (1996). Sisters in arms: Catholic nuns through two millennia. Harvard University Press.
- Thietmar (2001). Ottonian Germany: The Chronicon of Thietmar of Merseburg. Translated by Warner, David A. Manchester University Press.
- Wemple, Suzanne F. (1987). "Sanctity and Power: The Dual Pursuit of Early Medieval Women". In Bridenthal, Renate; Koonz, Claudia; Stuard, Susan (eds.). Becoming Visible: Women in European History. Houghton Mifflin Company.
- Yorke, Barbara (2003). Nunneries and the Anglo-Saxon royal houses. Continuum International Publishing Group.
- Schutz, Herbert (2010). The Medieval Empire in Central Europe: Dynastic Continuity in the Post. Cambridge Scholars Publishing.

Regnal titles
Office created	Princess-Abbess of Quedlinburg; 966–999	Succeeded by Adelheid I
