= Volkmarskeller =

Coordinates: 51°47′45″N 10°53′08″E

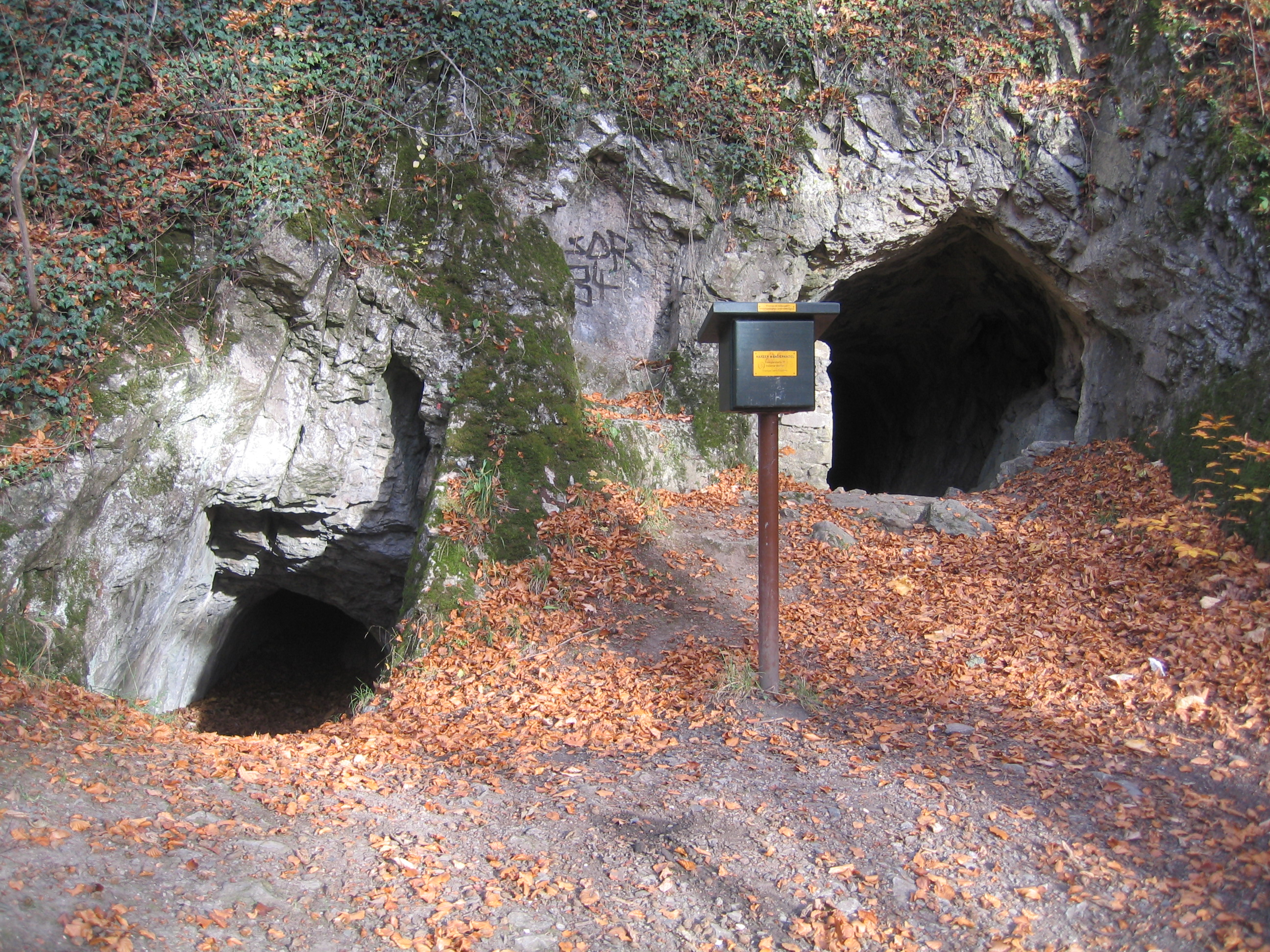
Cave openings at Volkmarskeller in the Harz

Volkmarskeller is the name of a cave that used to have a church next to it in the vicinity of Blankenburg (Harz) in the German state of Saxony-Anhalt.

== History ==
Around the period from 850 to 870, the hermit Liutbirg, who was highly respected by her contemporaries, lived in a retreat. She was a close confidante of bishops Haimo of Halberstadt and Ansgar of Bremen. Until the 1930s, her retreat was believed to have been at Volkmarskeller, until Walther Grosse was able to show that it could have been at Wendhusen Abbey near Thale.

Either way, the church near the cave of Volkmarskeller was dedicated to St. Michael and was gifted in 956 by Otto I to Quedlinburg Abbey. From then on, the cave, which was not far from the imperial hunting lodge of Bodfeld, provided shelter for pious settlers. For example, the death of a certain Bernhardus presbyter solitarius de Laide sancti Michaelis was recorded in 1118. According to the Annales Cistercienses, after several years of preparation that had begun in 1135, the cave and church was officially opened on 28 July 1146 as accommodation for Cistercian monks from Kamp Abbey under Abbot Roger.

In 1146, at the request of the Abbess of Quedlinburg, Beatrix II, Pope Innocent II approved the founding of the abbey and the allocation to the monastery of estates in Marsleben, Groß- and Klein-Ditfurt, Sülten and other places (today mostly abandoned villages near Quedlinburg). These had already been donated to the Quedlinburg Abbey in 1138/39 by Quedlinburg ministerialis, Burchard. In the period from 1151 to 1167, the monastery was moved to Evergodesrode at the lower end of the valley at the present site of Michaelstein Abbey.

The ruined cave dwellings were excavated in 1884-1887 by architect (Baurat) Brinkmann and made accessible.

== Tourism ==
The Volkmarskeller can be visited free of charge. It is located in the upper part of the monastery grounds, just above the trail that leads from Michaelstein Abbey to the hamlet of Eggeröder Brunnen. At the Volkmarskeller is a checkpoint (no. 87) in the Harzer Wandernadel hiking network. The nearest car park is in Eggeröder Brunnen which is about 15 minutes walk away.

Not far away is the former iron ore pit of Volkmar. In 1893, there was an explosion here that was caused by the complications of handling dynamite at temperatures below 7 °C. The Hüttenrode Alpine Club erected a memorial in 2007 to the miners who were killed. This is on the track and trail between Eggeröder Brunnen-Volkmarskeller and Michaelstein Abbey at Blankenburg.
