= Sophia of Saxony =

13th-century German noblewoman and abbess

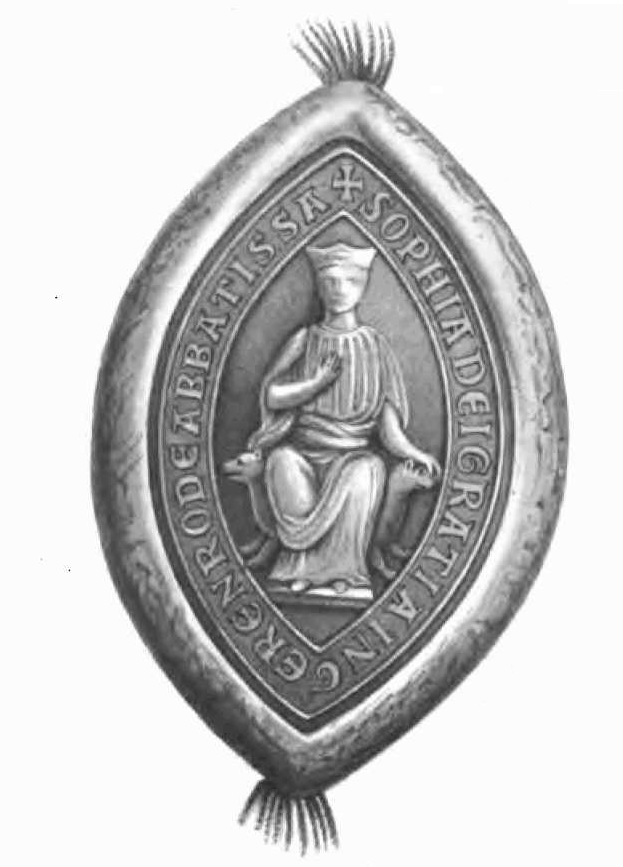
- Seal of Abbess Sophia of Gernrode

Abbess of Gernrode
- Reign: 1220–1244
- Predecessor: Adelaide II
- Successor: Ermengarde I of Gernrode
- Died: 1244; Gernrode Abbey
- Noble family: House of Ascania

Sophia of Saxony (died 1244) was a member of the House of Ascania, and the abbess of Gernrode (r.1220–1244).

== Life ==
Sophia was a member of the House of Ascania. Her parents were Bernard III of Saxony and Judith/Jutta of Poland, daughter of Mieszko III of Poland. Sophia was brought up in the abbey of Gernrode. Sophia's siblings included Albert I of Saxony and Henry I of Anhalt, the latter of whom was the advocate for the abbey of Gernrode.

Sophia succeeded Adelaide II as abbess of Gernrode in late 1220. The first recorded reference to Sophia as abbess is found in a charter issued in 1221.

In order to protect the abbey's wealth from embezzlement or theft, Sophia purchased extensive goods in Rieder. This purchase was confirmed by Sophia's brother, Henry I, in Aschersleben in 1223. A confirmation of all of the abbey's property and rights, issued by Pope Gregory IX in June 1227 also referred to the property in Rieder.

Sophia most likely died on 16 July 1244.

== Literature ==
- Andreas Popperodt: Historia Ecclesiae Gerenrodenses 1560, erste Fassung bei Johann Christoph Bekmann in Accesiones Historia Anhaltinae 1716 als Annales Gernrodensis.
- O. von Heinemann, Geschichte der Abtei und Beschreibung der Stiftskirche zu Gernrode. (H. C. Huch, Quedlinburg 1877).
- H.K. Schulze, Das Stift Gernrode. Unter Verwendung eines Manuskriptes von Reinhold Specht. Mit einem kunstgeschichtlichen Beitrag von Günther W. Vorbrodt. (Mitteldeutsche Forschungen Bd. 38), Böhlau, Köln 1965.
- A. Thiele, "Erzählende genealogische Stammtafeln zur europäischen Geschichte", Band I, Teilband 1 Deutsche Kaiser-, Königs-, Herzogs- und Grafenhäuser I
