= Adelaide I, Abbess of Quedlinburg =

Princess-Abbess of Quedlinburg from 999 to 1044/45

Adelaide I
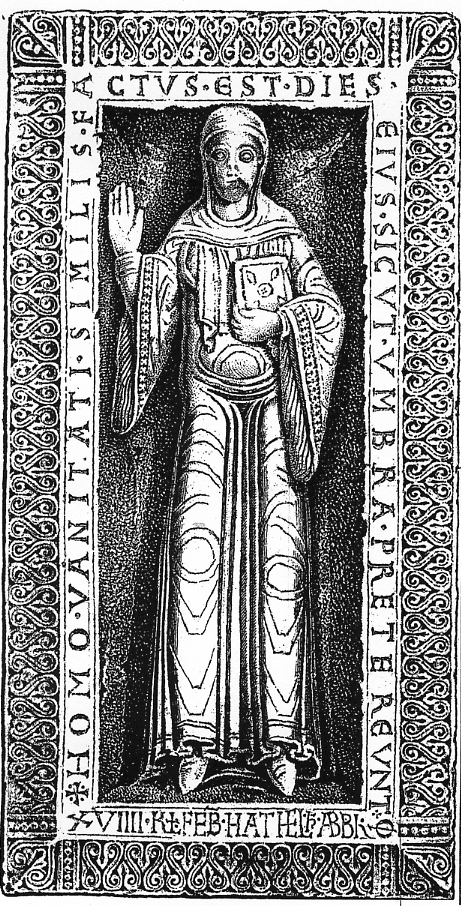
- Tombstone

Princess-abbess of Quedlinburg
- Reign: 999 – 14 January 1044 or 1045
- Predecessor: Matilda
- Successor: Beatrice I
- Born: 973/74
- Died: 14 January 1044 or 1045; Quedlinburg Abbey
- Burial: Quedlinburg Abbey
- Dynasty: Ottonian
- Father: Otto II, Holy Roman Emperor
- Mother: Theophanu
- Religion: Roman Catholic

Adelaide I (German: Adelheid; 973/74 (Note: The birth of a daughter of "Ottoni inperatori et Theophanu auguste...quam nominee matris sue imperatricis insignivit" is recorded in the Annalista Saxo in 977, but this appears incorrect assuming that the approximate birth dates of her sisters Sophie and Mathilde are correct and that Adelheid was her parents' oldest daughter as recorded by Thietmar, who also confirmed that she became a nun at Quedlinburg.) – 14 January 1044 or 1045), a member of the royal Ottonian dynasty was the second Princess-abbess of Quedlinburg from 999, and Abbess of Gernrode from 1014, and Abbess of Gandersheim from 1039 until her death, as well as a highly influential kingmaker of medieval Germany.

== Early life ==
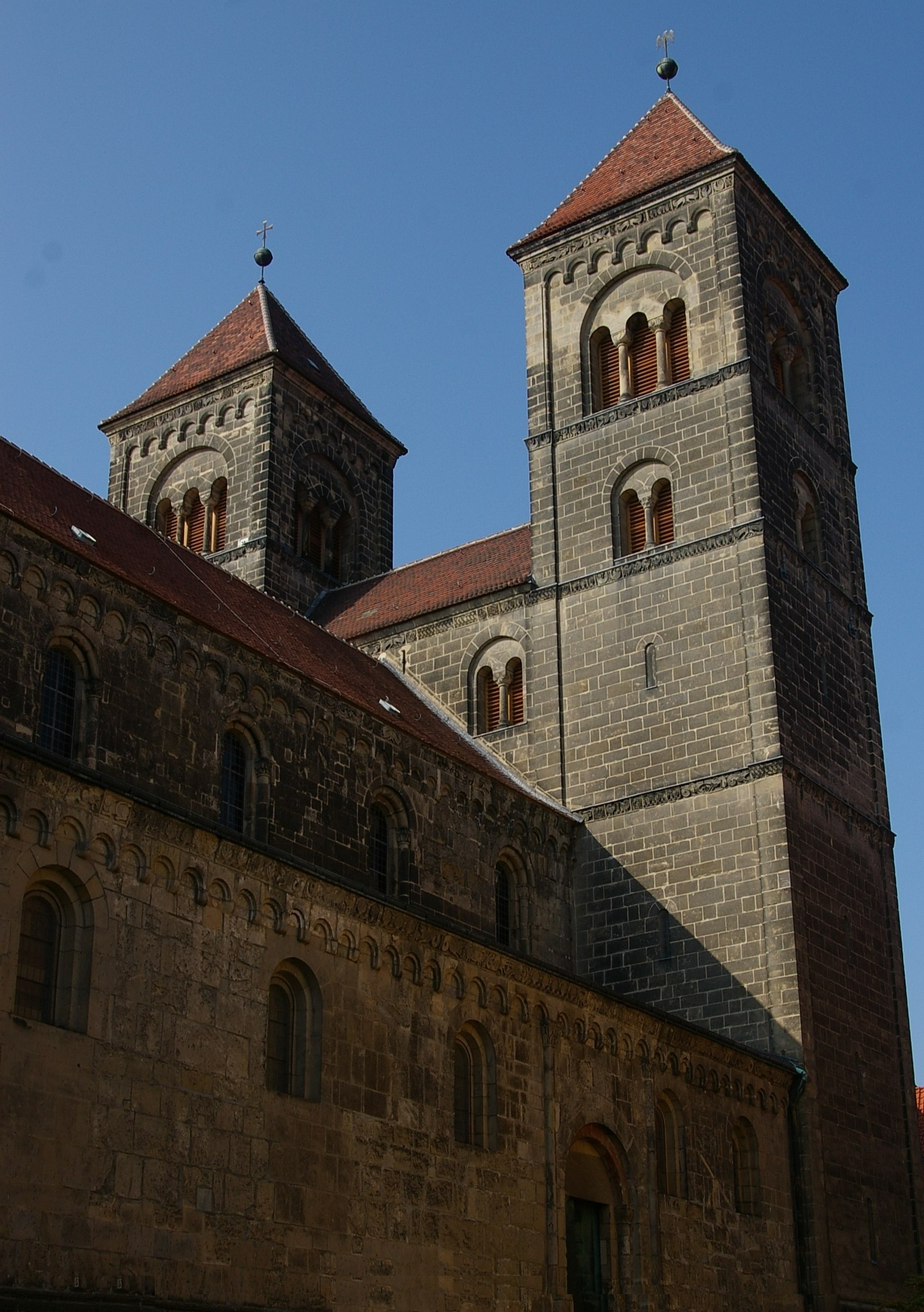
St Servatius Church, Quedlinburg

Named after her paternal grandmother, Queen Adelaide of Italy, Adelaide was the eldest daughter of Emperor Otto II and his consort Theophanu. She was educated in Quedlinburg Abbey by her paternal aunt, Abbess Matilda. While Matilda and Theophanu stayed at the Italian court of Pavia in 984, the young girl was abducted by the forces of her quarrelling uncle Duke Henry II of Bavaria in 984 and held in custody by his henchman, the Billung count Egbert the One-Eyed. Soon after, however, she was released by loyal Saxon troops.

In October 995 Adelaide became a canoness in Quedlinburg. When Abbess Matilda died on 7 February 999, she was elected her successor and consecrated on Michaelmas (September 28) by Bishop Arnulf of Halberstadt.

== Influencing the royal and imperial elections ==
In the German royal election of 1002 after the death of her brother Emperor Otto III, Adelaide and her sister Abbess Sophia of Gandersheim acted as true kingmakers, having rejected Margrave Eckard I of Meissen (who discounted their influence) as candidate for kingship. Interestingly enough, Adelaide had a previous encounter with Eckard I. When she was captured by her uncle, Henry II (as previously mentioned earlier), Eckard was one of the men to free her from her capture. Together with Sophia, Adelaide significantly influenced the election of her cousin Henry II as King of the Romans. Henry vested Quedlinburg Abbey with extended estates and in 1014 entrusted Adelaide with the administration of the convents in Gernrode, Frose and Vreden in Westphalia. He repeatedly celebrated important feasts at Quedlinburg and in 1021 attended the consecration of the St Servatius Collegiate Church together with Archbishop Gero of Magdeburg.

The princess-abbess and her sister would play the same role in the election of Henry's Salian successor King Conrad II in 1027. Nonetheless, when Sophia died on 27 January 1039, Conrad II at first denied Adelaide's request to succeed her as abbess of Gandersheim. Upon his death later in that year, King Henry III eventually granted her the right to rule Gandersheim too.

== Death ==
Adelaide died either on 14 January 1044 or on 14 January 1045 and was succeeded by her kinswoman, Beatrice of Franconia. She is buried in Quedlinburg Abbey. A lifesized tomb marker preserves the conventional image of Adelaide. She is represented as a holy woman by her monastic habit and Gospel book. In fact, the image depicts what Adelaide represented rather than Adelaide herself.

== Sources ==
- Bernhardt, John W. (2002). Itinerant Kingship and Royal Monasteries in Early Medieval Germany, C.936-1075. Cambridge University Press. ISBN 0-521-52183-1.
- McKitterick, Rosamond (1999). The Frankish Kingdoms under the Carolingians. Pearson Education Limited.
- Mitchell, Linda Elizabeth (1999). Women in medieval western European culture. Taylor & Francis. ISBN 0-8153-2461-8.
- Wolfram, Herwig (2006). Conrad II, 990-1039: emperor of three kingdoms. Translated by Kaiser, Denise Adele. Penn State Press. ISBN 0-271-02738-X.

Regnal titles
Preceded by Matilda	Princess-Abbess of Quedlinburg; 999 – 1044/45	Succeeded by Beatrice I
Preceded by Sophia I	Abbess of Gandersheim; 1039 – 1044/45	Succeeded by Beatrice I
Preceded by Hathui	Abbess of Gernrode; 1014 – 1044/45	Succeeded by Hazecha
