= Gernrode Abbey =

Monastery in Germany

Coordinates: 51°43′27″N 11°08′09″E

Imperial Abbey of Gernrode Stift Gernrode
- 959–1614
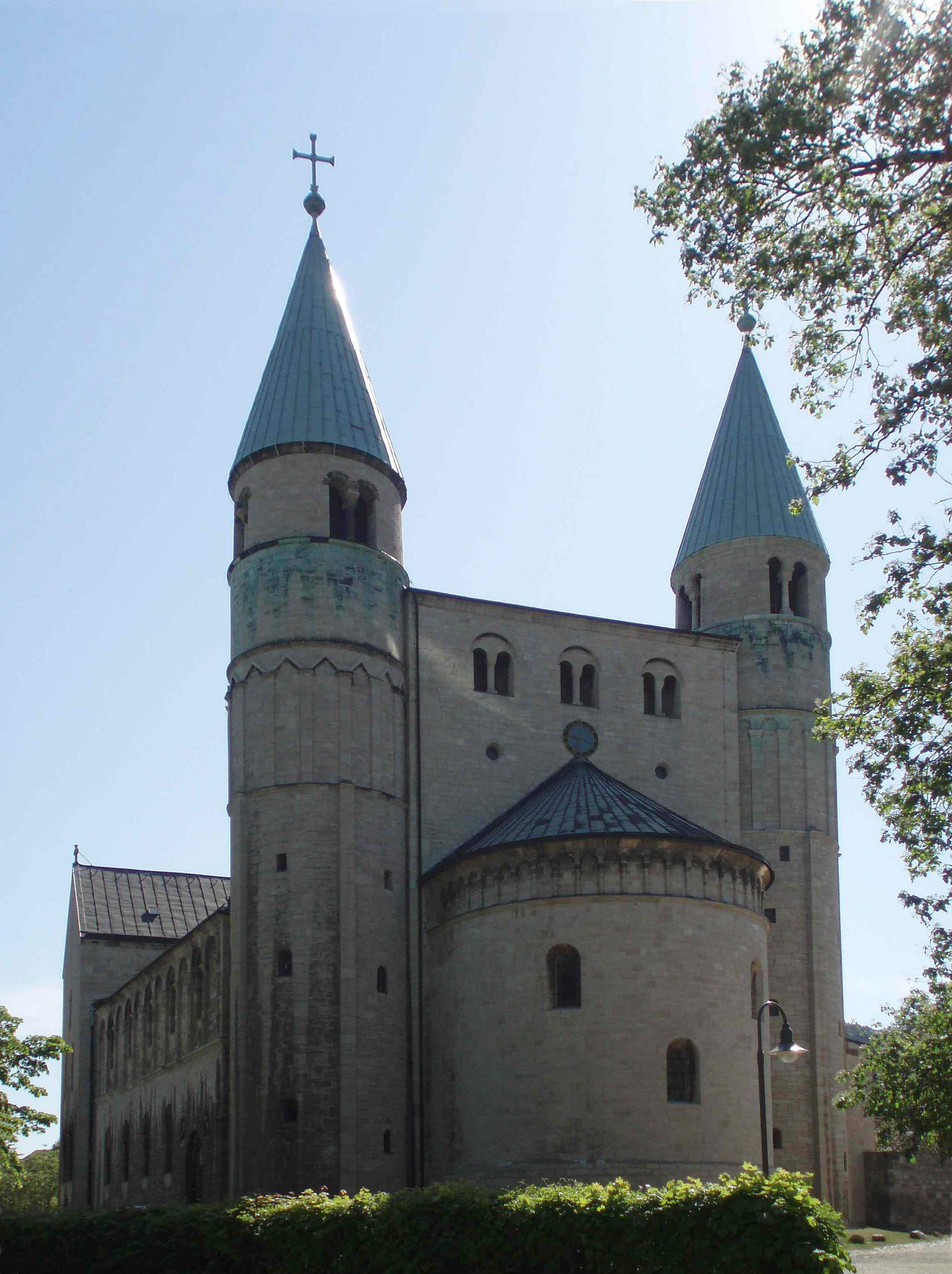
- The abbey church of Gernrode
- Status: Imperial Abbey
- Capital: Gernrode Abbey
- Government: Elective principality
- Historical era: Middle Ages, Early modern
  - Abbey founded: 959
  - Upper Saxon Circle: 1500
  - Turned Protestant: sixteenth century
  - Disestablished: 1614
  - Incorporated into Anhalt-Bernburg: 1816

Gernrode Abbey (German: Stift Gernrode) was a house of secular canonesses (Frauenstift) in Gernrode in what is now Saxony-Anhalt, Germany. Gernrode was founded in 959 and was disestablished in the seventeenth century. In the Middle Ages the abbey was an Imperial abbey, which had the status of imperial immediacy (German: Reichunmittelbarkeit), and an Imperial State. In the early modern period, the abbey was part of the Upper Saxon Circle.

== Foundation ==
In 959 Gero, margrave of the Saxon Eastern March, founded the abbey of Gernrode, at his castle of Geronisroth, in what is now the city of Gernrode, which is located on the north-eastern edge of the Harz mountains. Since Gero's sons, Siegfried and Gero, had died without heirs, he donated all of his personal property to the abbey after his death. The first abbess of Gernrode was Hathui, the widow of Gero's son. Hathui was a member of the Billung dynasty and was a niece of Queen Matilda. The abbey was intended as a burial place and memorial site for Gero.

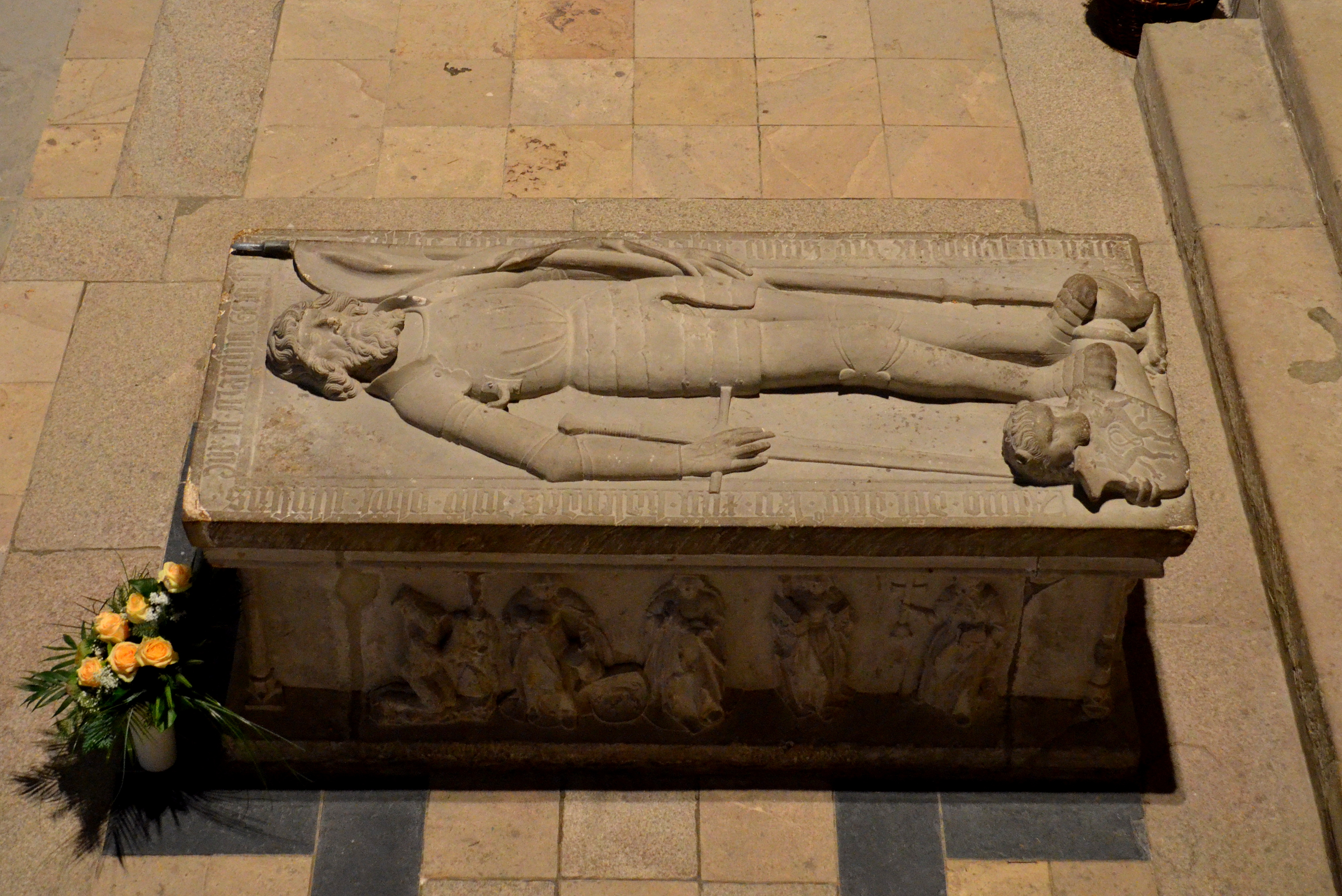
Tomb of Margrave Gero

In July 961, Emperor Otto I, a cousin of Abbess Hathui, granted Gernrode immunity and placed the abbey under imperial protection. The abbey was also granted the right of free election of its abbesses and advocates by means of a charter issued by emperor Otto III in 999. The abbey was also placed under papal protection at this time. The abbey was originally dedicated to the Virgin Mary and St Peter. Yet, on a journey to Rome, Gero acquired relics of Cyriakus. The abbey and its collegiate church, Saint Cyriakus, Gernrode, were thus re-dedicated to Cyriakus, and became a centre for his cult.

== Gernrode in the Middle Ages ==
The earliest documented advocates of the abbey, from the twelfth-century onwards, were members of the House of Ascania, starting probably with Albert the Bear. The second abbess of Gernrode was Adelaide I (r.1014-1044), daughter of Otto II. Adelaide was already abbess of Quedlinburg (r.999-1044), and at this time, Gernrode was closely connected with the abbey of Quedlinburg. In Ottonian times, Gernrode had a similar status to the abbeys of Quedlinburg, Gandersheim, Essen and Vreden. Gernrode was part of a prayer confraternity with Gandersheim and Vreden. Yyet, from the eleventh century onwards, Gernrode lost some of its royal connections, as the Askanier dynasty increased their control over the abbey. There were far fewer royal visits to Gernrode than other female abbeys. In the eleventh and twelfth centuries, only Empress Cunigunde, Emperor Henry V, and Emperor Frederick Barbarossa visited Gernrode. After Frederick Barbarossa held an imperial assembly at Gernrode in 1188, there were no further royal visits to Gernrode. In 1357 Emperor Charles IV issued an imperial diploma confirming Gernrode's rights.

== Convent ==
From its foundation, the abbesses and provosts of Gernrode came from members of noble German dynasties, including the Billung, Askanier, and the House of Wettin. There were initially places for 24 noblewomen at Gernrode, plus another 12 at Frose. In addition to the nuns, Gernrode also possessed canonesses, who were connected with the altars of the church of St Cyriakus in Gernrode. The canonesses of Gernrode came primarily from the geographical area between Plettenberg in modern North Rhine-Westphalia, and Löbau in eastern Saxony. Together, the nuns and canonesses of Gernrode and Frose made up the convent. The members of the convent jointly elected the abbess, in the presence of the advocate. Like the abbesses of Quedlinburg, Gandersheim, Essen and Vreden, the abbesses of Gernrode were imperial princes, who each had their own seat at imperial assemblies.

== Possessions ==
Gernrode was richly endowed with allodial property by its founder, Gero. It also received donations from Emperor Otto I. Other Ottonian and Salian emperors, and also Margrave Eckbert II of Meissen and Abbess Hedwig of Seeburg also made donations of property to Gernrode. A false document, purporting to be from the founder, Gero, but actually written in 1207, confirmed that Gernrode possessed 24 villages, 21 churches, and 400 hides of property, scattered in various locations.

== Gernrode in the Late Middle Ages and Early Modern Period ==
Over time, and particularly from the thirteenth century onwards, Gernrode lost its former influence. Various factors played a role in this, including mismanagement by abbesses, the general economic situation, and particularly the politics of the archbishops of Magdeburg and the bishops of Halberstadt. Until 1381 the abbesses of Gernrode succeeded in enforcing their exemption from the bishopric of Halberstadt. In the fifteenth and sixteenth centuries, members of the House of Anhalt (descended from the Askanier) tried to incorporate the abbey into their own domains. The abbesses of Gernrode tried to protect the abbey by securing confirmations of their rights from various emperors, including Sigismund, Frederick III, Charles V, Maximilian II and Rudolf II.

In connection with the Peasants War in 1525 there was an unsuccessful revolt by the serfs of Gernrode against the increased levies imposed by Abbess Elizabeth of Weida (r.1504-1532). By 1544 the possessions of the abbey consisted only of the town of Gernrode and 5 villages. By the early seventeenth century the abbey's possessions covered around two square miles.

The Reformation began during the abbacy of Elizabeth of Weida, and from 1545 Protestant worship was introduced at Gernrode. The abbey was turned into a Protestant convent. The abbess retained the status of imperial prince and continued to have a seat both at imperial assemblies and in the council of the Upper Saxon Circle.

Between 1610 and 1614, members of the House of Anhalt incorporated the remaining possessions of Gernrode into their own domains. The last abbess of Gernrode, Sophie Elisabeth, left the abbey in 1614 in order to marry. The princes of Anhalt refused to appoint a new abbess and completed the incorporation of Gernrode into their territory.

== List of Abbesses of Gernrode ==
=== 959 to 1300 ===
- Hathui (r.959-1014)
- Adelaide I (r.1014-1044)
- Hazecha (r.1044-1063)
- Hedwig II (of Stade) (r.1063-1118)
- Hedwig III (of Seeburg) (r.1118-1152)
- unknown (1152–1205)
- Richinza (r.1205-1206)
- Adelaide II (r.1206-1220)
- Sophia of Saxony (r.1220-1244)
- Ermengarde I (r.1244-1248)
- Oda (r.1248-1260?)
- Gertrude I (of Anhalt) (r.1260-1275?)
- Mechtild (of Braunschweig-Lüneberg) (r.1275-1297)

=== 1300 to 1614 ===
- Ermengarde II (of Ummendorf) (r.1297-1307)
- Hedwig IV (r.1307-1316)
- Gertrude II (of Boventhen) (r.1316-1324)
- Jutta (of Oesede) (r.1324-1334)
- Gertrude III (of Everstein) (r.1334-1344)
- Gertrude IV (of Hessen) (r.1344-1348)
- Adelaide III (of Anhalt) (r.1348-1374)
- Adelaide IV (of Walde) (r.1374-1400)
- Bertradis (of Snaudit) (r.1400-1425)
- Agnes (of Landsberg) (r.1425-1445/51)
- Mechtild II (of Anhalt) (r.1445/51-1463)
- Margarethe (of Merwitz) (r.1463-1469)
- Scholastica (of Anhalt) (r.1469-1504)
- Elizabeth (of Weida) (r.1504-1532)
- Anna I (of Plauen) (r.1532-1548)
- Anna II (of Kittlitz) (r.1548-1558)
- Elizabeth II (of Gleichen) (r.1558-1564)
- Elizabeth III (of Anhalt) (r.1565-1570)
- Anna Maria (of Anhalt) (r.1570-1577)
- Sybilla (of Anhalt) (r.1577-1581)
- Agnes Hedwig (of Anhalt) (r.1581-1586)
- Dorothea Maria (of Anhalt) (r.1586-1593)
- Sophie Elisabeth (r.1593-1614)
