= Adelaide II of Büren =

German nun

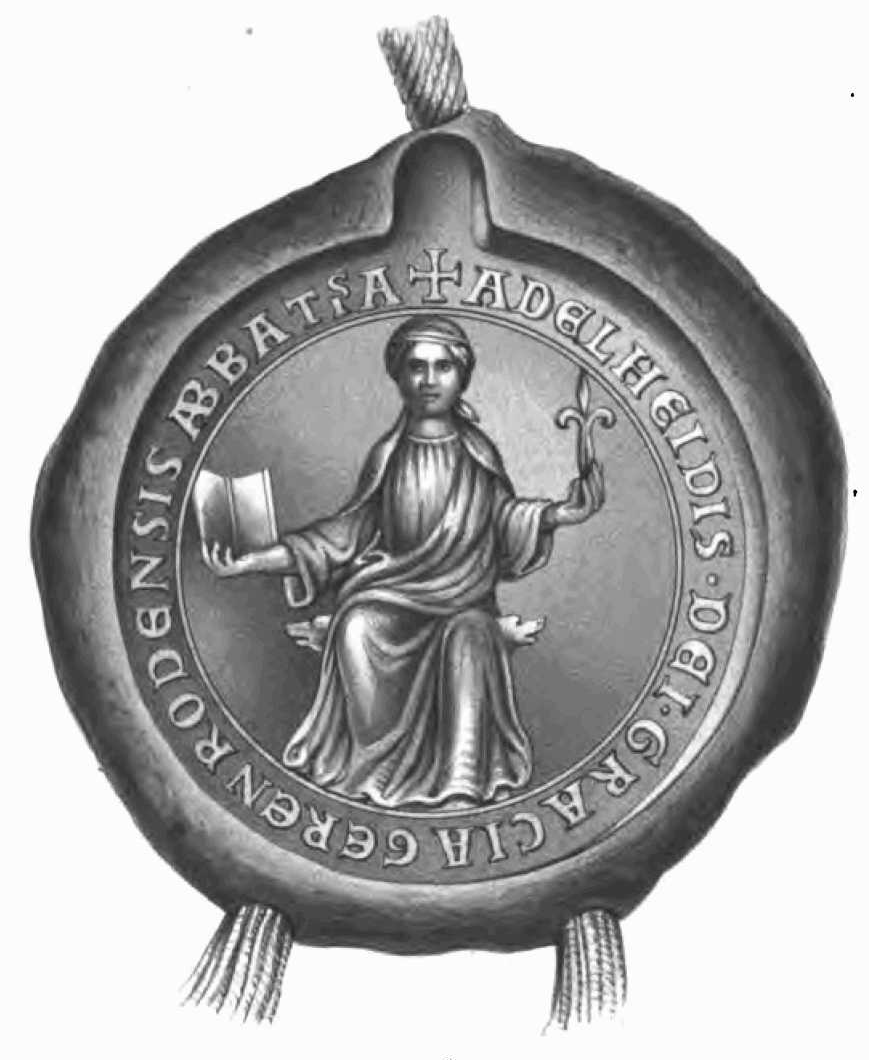
- Seal of Abbess Adelaide II of Gernrode

Abbess of Gernrode
- Reign: 1206–1220
- Predecessor: Richinza
- Successor: Sophia
- Died: 3 November 1220; Gernrode Abbey

Adelaide II of Büren (also Adelheid II. von Büren; † 3 November 1220) was the abbess of Gernrode Abbey (r. 1207–1220).

== Life ==
Adelaide II was a member of the von Büren dynasty, a noble family which owned property in Büren, Wünnenberg and Wewelsburg. Adelaide was probably elected abbess of Gernrode abbey in early 1207. She is named as abbess in a papal diploma issued in August 1207. During her time as abbess, there was conflict about the appointment of a seneschal between two Ministeriales of the abbey: the brothers Arnold and Frederick of Gernrode. The conflict was settled by Bishop Frederick of Halberstadt on 10 August 1220.

Adelaide died on 3 November, probably 1220.
