= Hathui, Abbess of Gernrode =

Abbess of Gernrode from 959 to 1014

Hathui (also Hadwig and Hedwig) (born c. 939; died 4 July 1014) was a member of the Saxon House of Billung and the first abbess of Gernrode.

== Family ==
Hathui was the daughter of Wichmann the Elder, of the House of Billung, and an unknown woman. Because Thietmar of Merseburg called Hauthi the niece (neptis) of Queen Matilda, Hathui's mother has sometimes been identified as one of Matilda's sisters, Bia or Frederuna. Hathui had at least two brothers: Wichmann the Younger and Eckbert. Bruno, Bishop of Verden may also have been Hathui's brother. Hathui was a cousin of Emperor Otto I.

== Marriage ==
In 952, when she was about thirteen years old, Hathui married Siegfried, son of Margrave Gero of the Saxon Eastern March, who stood high in Otto I's favour. Siegfried died only a few years later, on 24 June 959. The couple had no surviving children.

== Abbess of Gernrode and Vreden ==
After Siegfried's death, Hathui became a nun and, at the request of her father-in-law, Gero, abbess of Gero's new foundation of Gernrode. Gero's second son, Gero, also died in 959, leaving him without heirs; he then donated the bulk of his property to Gernrode. Hathui was consecrated in 962 by Bishop Bernard of Halberstadt. She remained abbess of Gernrode until her death 55 years later. Hathui was also abbess of Vreden, where she shared the office of advocate with her nephew, Wichmann III, son of Eckbert.

== Legend ==
Hathui is said to have cared for and healed the sick at the ‘Sacred Pool’ (Heiliger Teich) south of Gernrode. After her death in 1014 the water of the pool is said to have turned first blood-red, then bright green, before returning to its normal colour.

== Literature ==
- C. Warnke, 'Das Kanonissenstift St. Cyriacus zu Gernrode im Spannungsfeld zwischen Hochadel, Kaiser, Bischof und Papst von der Gründung 961 bis zum Ende des Investiturstreits 1122,' in I. Crusius, ed., Studien zum Kanonissenstift (= Veröffentlichungen des Max-Planck-Instituts für Geschichte. Bd. 167 = Studien zur Germania Sacra. Bd. 24). (Vandenhoeck & Ruprecht, Göttingen 2001), ISBN 3-525-35326-X, S. 201–274
- Reuter, Timothy. Germany in the Early Middle Ages 800–1056. New York: Longman, 1991.
- W. Glocker, Die Verwandten der Ottonen und ihre Bedeutung in der Politik.
- O. von Heinemann, Geschichte der Abtei und Beschreibung der Stiftskirche zu Gernrode (H. C. Huch, Quedlinburg 1877).
- M. Giese, ed., Die Annales Quedlinburgenses, MGH Script. rer. Germ., 72 (Hannover, 2004).
- Thietmar of Merseburg, Chronicon, ed. R. Holtzmann MGH SS NS 9 (Berlin, 1935).
- R. Kellermann and G. Kellermann, 'Heiliger Teich', in Chronik der Stadt Gernrode, Gernroder Kulturverein Andreas Popperodt e.V. 2013.
