= Oda of Meinersen =

German Roman Catholic abbess

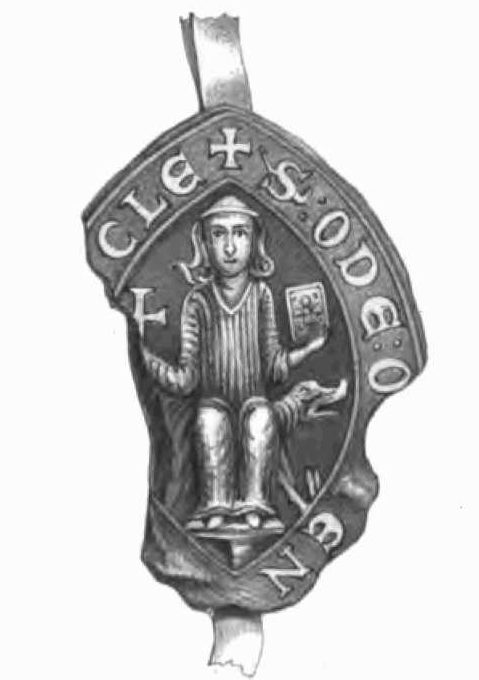
- Seal of Abbess Oda of Gernrode

Abbess of Gernrode
- Reign: 1248 – 1260
- Predecessor: Ermengarde I of Gernrode
- Successor: Gertrude I of Gernrode
- Died: c.1260 Gernrode Abbey

Oda of Meinersen (b. before 1228; d. c.1260) was the abbess of Gernrode (r.1248-1260).

== Life ==
Oda was a member of a noble dynasty from Lower Saxony, the Meinersen. Oda's parents are unknown, but her brother, Burchard, was the vicedominus of the bishops of Halberstadt between 1227 and 1269.

Oda is only mentioned in documents issued in 1248 and 1249. She was abbess of Gernrode by 30 June 1248, on which date she is named in a charter issued by Archbishop Wilbrand of Magdeburg, which records the payment of interest to the Apostolic Camera.

A charter issued in 1249 dealt with the settlement of a dispute between Oda and the convent of Gernrode about the sale of two golden tablets. The tablets had been donated to the convent by Henry I of Anhalt. The charter was witnessed by three members of the convent, including the provost, Gertrude I of Anhalt, who was Henry I's daughter, and would succeed Oda as abbess of Gernrode after 1260.

== Literature ==
- Andreas Popperodt: Historia Ecclesiae Gerenrodenses 1560, erste Fassung bei Johann Christoph Bekmann in Accesiones Historia Anhaltinae 1716 als Annales Gernrodensis.
- O. von Heinemann, Geschichte der Abtei und Beschreibung der Stiftskirche zu Gernrode. (H. C. Huch, Quedlinburg 1877).
- H.K. Schulze, Das Stift Gernrode. Unter Verwendung eines Manuskriptes von Reinhold Specht. Mit einem kunstgeschichtlichen Beitrag von Günther W. Vorbrodt. (Mitteldeutsche Forschungen Bd. 38), Böhlau, Köln 1965.
- H. Hartung: Zur Vergangenheit von Gernrode (Carl Mittag, Gernrode 1912).
- P. Przybilla, et al., Die Edelherren von Meinersen: Genealogie, Herrschaft und Besitz vom 12. bis zum 14. Jahrhundert (Hahnsche, 2007).
