= Wichmann the Elder =

Brother of Amelung

- Died: 23 April 944
- Noble family: Billung
- Issue: Wichmann II; Bruno, Bishop of Verden; Egbert the One-Eyed; Hathui, Abbess of Gernrode

Wichmann I the Elder (also spelled Wigmann or Wichman) (died 23 April 944) was a member of the Saxon House of Billung. He was a brother of Amelung, Bishop of Verden, and Herman, Duke of Saxony.

== Biography ==
In 938, Wichmann rebelled because his younger brother Herman had been given military command of the northern reaches of the Duchy of Saxony. He believed that he had a better claim to the office by virtue of his seniority and his Königsnähe (closeness to the king), because he was related by marriage to the queen dowager Matilda. He was joined by Eberhard of Franconia, and Thankmar, the half-brother of King Otto I. The revolt was soon suppressed. Thankmar died the same year he and Eberhard came to terms. Wichmann allied with some Slavs and made war against his former compatriots. He reconciled to Otto in 941.

== Personal life ==
Wichmann married Frederuna (or Fridaruna), daughter of Dietrich of Ringelheim. She became a nun after her husband's death and died on 18 January 971. She left him at least three sons and a daughter:

- Wichmann II
- Bruno, Bishop of Verden
- Egbert the One-Eyed
- Hathui, married Siegfried, son of Gero the Great, possibly mother of Gero, Count of Alsleben.

Wichmann and Frederuna may have been the parents of Dietrich, Margrave of the Nordmark.

== Sources ==
- Reuter, Timothy (6 June 2014). Germany in the Early Middle Ages c. 800-1056. Taylor & Francis. p. 1. ISBN 978-1-317-87238-2.
- Thompson, James Westfall. Feudal Germany, Volume II. New York: Frederick Ungar Publishing Co., 1928.
- Bernhardt, John W. Itinerant Kingship and Royal Monasteries in Early Medieval Germany, c. 936–1075. Cambridge: Cambridge University Press, 1993.
