= Adelaide II, Abbess of Quedlinburg =

Princess-Abbess of Quedlinburg from 1063 to 1096

Adelaide II
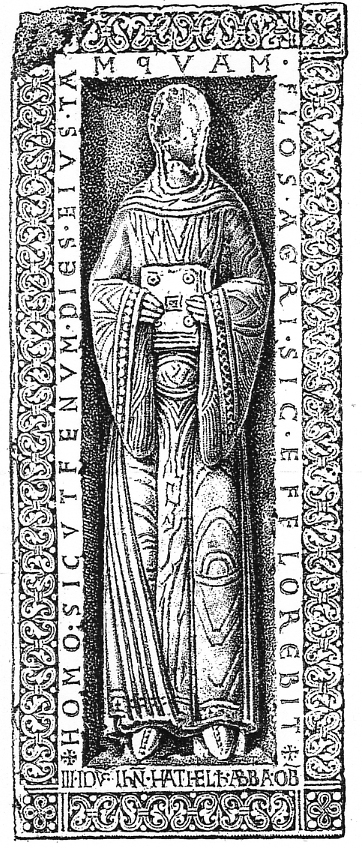
- Tombstone of Princess Adelaide II

Princess-Abbess of Quedlinburg
- Reign: 1063 – 11 January 1096
- Predecessor: Beatrix I
- Successor: Eilica
- Born: 1045; Goslar (?), Saxony
- Died: 11 January 1096 (aged 50–51); Quedlinburg, Saxony
- Burial: Quedlinburg Abbey
- House: Salian dynasty
- Father: Henry III, Holy Roman Emperor
- Mother: Agnes of Poitou
- Religion: Roman Catholic

Adelaide II (German: Adelheid; 1045–1096) was a member of the Salian dynasty and powerful abbess of Gandersheim and Quedlinburg from 1063 to 1096. As daughter of Henry III, sister of Henry IV, and half-sister to Beatrice I, she had an important role in the German monarch and the religious revolution, the Investiture Controversy.

== Family ==
Adelaide was born about September/October 1045, presumably at the Imperial Palace of Goslar, as the first child of King Henry III of Germany (1016–1056) from his second marriage with the French princess Agnes of Poitou (c.1025–1077), a daughter of Duke William V of Aquitaine. Henry had vainly hoped for a male heir to the throne; unsettled, the royal couple headed for their coronation by Pope Clement II in Rome the following year. Not until 1050, a son, Henry IV, was born, to the great relief of his parents. Adelaide's father died in 1056, leaving their minor son and his siblings under the regency of the dowager empress.

== Early Life and Abbacy ==
Within the Salian Dynasty, the women, including Adelaide II, were educated, literate, and extremely rich. Each of these factors aided in the power that these women wielded.

From Adelaide II's early life, there is context given by a twelfth-century document written by someone called Annalista Saxo. He wrote that Adelaide was living at the monastery of Gandersheim where her half-sister, Beatrice, was abbess, as most of the imperial princesses had done to that point because they could be safe and educated at Gandersheim and prepared for the future role in the Church. Her succession of Quedlinburg and Gandersheim followed the death of Beatrice I, bringing Adelaide to power in the abbess role.

In the Annalista Saxo, there are accounts which discuss Adelaide's decision to become a nun, offering some more clues about her early life. Adelaide grew up and felt the call to become a nun when she was persuaded to take vows by a man named Ekkhard, a canon of the church of Saint Stephen in Halberstad, and Bishop Burchard II of Halberstadt. She became a canoness at Gandersheim where she eventually succeeded Beatrice as abbess.

Before Adelaide II, the role of abbess appeared to be a hereditary position for females within the dynasty to proceed one another in the abbey. Whereas Beatrice was imposed on the community as abbess by her father, Adelaide was elected abbess of Gandersheim in 1063, after Beatrice died. Two years later, she became abbess of Quedlinburg in 1063.

During Adelaide II's time in the Abbey, she proved to be powerful in many ways, even though women's roles in the abbey were heavily brushed over. A document survived that states Adelaide negotiated with Duke Magnus of Saxony to protect a piece of property, owned by the monastery of Quedlingburg, from the "infestation of bad men", which most likely meant some plundering or abuse of tenants or both happened and Adelaide sought to drive them away by allying with a powerful noble. The nuns agreed to make a substantial payment of livestock and various goods once a year in exchange for protection.

Most historians refer to the position as princess-abbess because women like Adelaide never surrendered their role as a princess of the realm. Germany was ruled by a king but there was also a representative body of the kingdom's nobles called the imperial diet. At the meetings of the imperial diet, the nobility (usually called the princes and princess-abbesses of the kingdom) voted on proposed laws. There are several princess-abbesses who had an individual vote at these meetings, and both Gandersheim and Quedlingburg did.

Adelaide II and her family were directly involved with the secular abuse of power within the monarchy. Adelaide's position as abbess of Quedlinburg and Gandersheim fell under the influence of St. Benedictine. This exclusive position was traditionally elected by the community. However, a precedent set in 937 by Emperor Otto I later afforded them the right to elect their abbess from among their own. The Salian Dynasty appeared to take hold of this opportunity, as they had appointed Beatrice I directly. Although mentioned before, Adelaide II was elected by the community. While Adelaide II found her role within this abuse of secular power, she eventually defied her family's expectations and sided with the church. While at first Adelaide II opposed her family's position and sided with Pope Gregory VII, she was devoted to her role as abbess and spiritual foundations, asserting herself a powerful figure within this church and state reform.

== Involvement In The Investiture Controversy ==
Well before 1076, tension had been building up, concerning the power, influence, and leadership between church and state within Western Europe. This tension began as a grassroots reform, a bottom-up approach, as seen through the abuses of church members and monasteries as well as the oppression of peasants. The rise of feudalism, private lordship, and attacks against the Church led to an informal alliance between peasantry and the clergy as they fought to protect basic freedoms.

While this papacy reform began at the bottom, this did not dismiss that there was trouble in Rome. The harbinger of these issues began with the Council of Sutri (1046), where Pope Benedict IX (1032-44) had initially stepped down from his role, allowing for Gregory VI (1045-46) to succeed, but later demanded his position back. King Henry III steps in to resolve the infighting by appointing someone of his own choosing: his cousin, known as both Bishop Bruno of Toul and Pope Leo IX. As a result of the Council of Sutri, Pope Leo IX became the first semi-reformist Pope, asserting that papal authority was distinct from lay authority, which came as a surprise to Henry IV and the monarchy.

At the Synod at Rome (1059), Pope Nicholas II asserted the College of Cardinals was the only institution empowered to appoint the Pope. By limiting the involvement of papal decisions to the Church, the German kingdom perceived this as a direct attack against their authority. Nicholas II went further by condemning lay investiture, challenging the power of noble men and women and questioning the validity of state-inserted bishops.

The Investiture Controversy began in 1076, between Pope Gregory VII (the most radical Pope seen yet) and Henry IV. Pope Gregory began the conflict with his writing and distribution of the Dictatus Papae, which consisted of a list of powers allotted to the Pope, under his control. When Henry IV attempted to appoint the Archbishop of Milan in 1076, Pope Gregory refused this appointment. Both leaders entered into a period of denouncing one another, until Pope Gregory VII excommunicated Henry IV in 1076. This ultimately led to the Saxon Rebellion in 1077.

The Saxon Rebellion held space for many of Germany's nobles to turn against Henry IV. Here, Adelaide II, used Quedlinburg as a prominent venue within the rebellion. Adelaide II and Henry IV, her brother, had a history of tension, which led to her siding against him within this conflict. In the past, rumors held that Henry IV had his sister disgraced by one of his companions, and this resulted in a strain between the two. Adelaide II took this chance to work against Henry IV, and was not a supporter of his interests. Therefore, Adelaide II went against her family, the Salian Dynasty, and sided with the church to reform the influence of the power between secular spiritual leaders. This speaks to her devotion to her role as abbess.

Quedlinburg stuck out to be a prominent venue within the Saxon Rebellion, and in 1085, a Synod took place there in Quedlinburg, Germany, and was led by Gregory's legate. Here they discussed Henry's excommunication, and the ramification and consequences of the decision, therefore leading to further conversation about what was next. The council ultimately held this Synod in support of the papacy.

== Scholarship and Analysis of Women in the 11th Century ==
To set precedence, older sources do not mention the role of women in the 11th century. They tend to be very looked over with their roles. “The Church in Western Europe from the Tenth to Early Twelfth Century” by Gerd Tellenbach was published in the 1930's. This piece of scholarship focuses on the church and the Investiture Controversy and just focuses on the pope and the king with women being in the background or there was no mention. This source takes a pro-papacy position. “The Investiture Controversy: Church and Monarchy from the Ninth to the Twelfth Century” by Uta-Renate Blumenthal was published in the 1980's. Even though this book came out decades later than Tellenbach’s book, there is still a lack of women mentioned and still only focuses on the conflict between the pope and king while overlooking women. This is a representation of how women in the 11th century were overlooked within scholarship. Although, Adelaide II was very significant and unlike many other abbesses seen during this time. She was incredibly involved within German politics, and the Investiture Controversy. Therefore, to uncover more on Adelaide II, the role of abbess women within the 11th century can be more understood and acknowledge their rightful position in society. Not until the late 20th-21st century, women within the 11th century were overlooked and not accurately reported on.

When looking at Adelaide II’s experience as an unrecognized source of influence, Matilda of Tuscany’s role during the rise of Gregorian Reform offers even more insight to the lives of women and social practices within the Church. Similar to Adelaide II, Matilda’s kinship to Henry IV, as second cousins, and her the Investiture Controversy lends another angle to women’s political agency in the eleventh century. In Fiona Griffith’s 2008 analysis on the pastoral care of women, there are a number of instances in which male reformers, including Pope Gregory VII, displayed considerable acts of chivalry. Gregory regarded Matilda as a devoted follower and loyal friend, even to the extent that he was criticized for his compassion. Anti-reformists targeted Gregory’s affiliation with Matilda, claiming that the foundation of the Church was now subject to “a new senate of women.” While adversaries of Reform pushed toward the suppression of women, Gregory invited their spiritual contributions and political allyship. As a mentor figure, Gregory heavily supported Matilda in his charge, explaining how he had “no more confidence in any prince of this world" than he did with her mother, a canoness named Beatrice. As seen from their correspondence, reform on the ground permeated into much of these women’s lives, especially those in connection with the Salian Dynasty. Extending outside of Adelaide II and Henry IV, it is noted that Gregory kept a strong tie to Henry’s mother, Queen Agnes, even after her death. In his letter to the Germans 1076 A.D., Gregory stated that his efforts to compromise with Henry and restore his soul were partly “out of reverence for his father and mother.” Throughout the duration of the Investiture Controversy, the shadow of these Salian women were omnipresent in the outcome of Reform. Later, Matilda’s role as countess and mediator at the Synod of Worms in 1076 would reflect a significant amount of militaristic and political influence, testifying to the agency of women within the conflict. This is particularly true when considering their personal opposition and political action against Henry, asserting their place in the midst of the Controversy. The parallels between Adelaide II and Matilda offer a mirror into the range of power that these Salian women utilized in eleventh century geopolitics.

== Death ==
Adelaide II died on January 11, 1096 at the age of 51. She would be succeeded by her niece Agnes, who was the daughter of her sister Judith. Adelaide II is buried next to her predecessors Adelaide I and her half-sister Beatrice in the Collegiate Church.

Adelaide II, Abbess of Quedlinburg Salian dynasty Born: 1045 Died: 11 January 1096
Regnal titles
Preceded by Beatrice I	Princess-Abbess of Quedlinburg; 1063 – 11 January 1096	Succeeded by Eilica
Preceded by Beatrice I	Abbess of Gandersheim; 1061 – 11 January 1096	Succeeded by Adelheid III
