= Beatrice I, Abbess of Quedlinburg =

Princess-Abbess of Quedlinburg from 1044 to 1061

Beatrice I
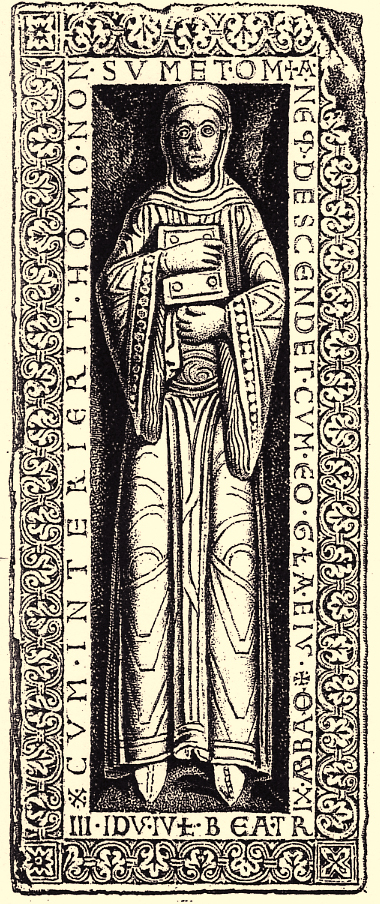

Princess-Abbess of Quedlinburg
- Reign: 24 June 1045 – 13 July 1061
- Predecessor: Adelheid I
- Successor: Adelheid II
- Born: 1037
- Died: 13 July 1061 (aged 23–24)
- Burial: Quedlinburg Abbey, Michaelstein Abbey (?)
- House: Salian Dynasty (by birth)
- Father: Henry III, Holy Roman Emperor
- Mother: Gunhilda of Denmark
- Religion: Roman Catholic

Beatrice I, also known as Beatrice of Franconia (German: Beatrix von Franken; 1037 – 13 July 1061), was Abbess of Gandersheim Abbey from 1043 and Princess-Abbess of Quedlinburg Abbey from 1044 until her death.

Beatrix was born in Italy towards the end of 1037 as the only child of the Holy Roman Emperor Henry III and his first wife, Gunhilda of Denmark, who died about six months after Beatrice's birth.

== Reign as princess-abbess ==
=== Consecration ===
On 14 January 1044, after the death of her kinswoman, Abbess Adelaide I, Beatrice was installed as Abbess of Gandersheim Abbey by her father, overriding the right of the canonesses to elect their own head. She was additionally consecrated Abbess of Quedlinburg on 24 June 1044 in Merseburg Cathedral, also succeeding Adelaide I, and a little later was created abbess of Stift Vreden.

=== Conflicts ===
In Gandersheim, she was at the centre of a long-running conflict with the canonesses, who accused her of subinfeudating estates of the abbey that were intended for the direct support of the community, and thereby bringing them into financial hardship. Three popes were involved in this affair, which went on for years: Leo IX decided initially in favour of the canonesses; Victor II reversed the decision in favour of the abbess. Finally, Stephen IX set out a compromise, at the end of 1057, which was apparently that the prebendal estates of the community were to be reserved for its upkeep, but that the abbess had the right to manage freely the remaining estates and her own properties as she saw fit.

Even this solution held only until the death of Beatrice; under her successor, her half-sister Adelaide II, the conflict broke out all over again.

== Death ==
Beatrice died on 13 July 1061. She was buried in the abbey church of Quedlinburg but her remains must have been removed elsewhere after the disastrous fire of 1070. A lead casket, which almost certainly contains the bones of Beatrice, has been preserved in Michaelstein Abbey since about 1161. In the crypt of the rebuilt church at Quedlinburg a tablet from the time of its rededication in 1129 serves as Beatrice's memorial.

== Sources ==
- Black-Veldtrup, Mechthild, 1995: Kaiserin Agnes (1043-1077): Quellenkritische Studien. Cologne: Böhlau
- Boshof, Egon, 2000: Die Salier. Stuttgart: Kohlhammer Verlag
- Kronenberg, Kurt, 1981: Die Äbtissinen des Reichsstifts Gandersheim. Bad Gandersheim: Verlag Gandersheimer Tageblatt
- Vogtherr, Thomas, 2002: Die salischen Äbtissinnen des Reichsstifts Quedlinburg, in: Von sacerdotium und regnum, pp. 405–420. Cologne: Böhlau ISBN 3-412-16401-1

== External links / Sources ==
- genealogie-mittelalter.de: Beatrix I (in German)
- Image of Beatrice

Regnal titles
Preceded by Adelheid I	Princess-Abbess of Quedlinburg; 24 June 1045 – 13 July 1061	Succeeded by Adelheid II
Preceded by Adelheid I	Abbess of Gandersheim; 14 January 1044 – 13 July 1061	Succeeded by Adelheid II
