= Quedlinburg Abbey =

Former abbey in Quedlinburg, Saxony-Anhalt, Germany

Coordinates: 51°47′09″N 11°08′13″E

UNESCO World Heritage Site
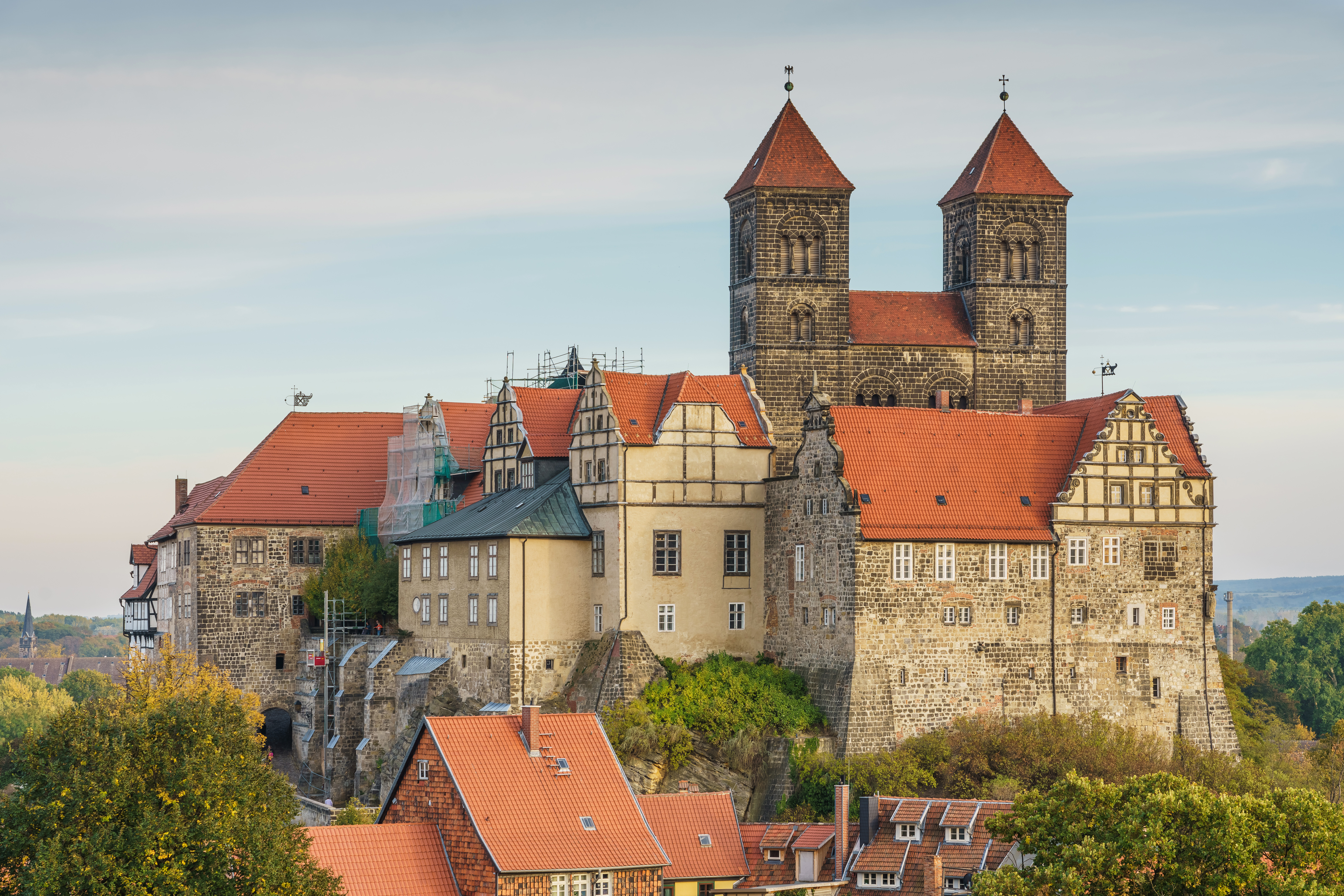
- Interactive map of Quedlinburg Abbey
- Official name: Collegiate Church, Castle, and Old Town of Quedlinburg
- Criteria: Cultural: iv
- Reference: 535
- Inscription: 1994 (18th Session)
- Area: 90 ha (220 acres)
- Buffer zone: 270 ha (670 acres)

Quedlinburg Abbey (German: Stift Quedlinburg or Reichsstift Quedlinburg) is a former abbey of secular canonesses (Frauenstift) in Quedlinburg, Saxony-Anhalt, Germany. It was founded in 936 on the initiative of Saint Matilda, the widow of the East Frankish King Henry the Fowler, as his memorial. For many centuries it and its abbesses enjoyed great prestige and influence. Quedlinburg Abbey was an Imperial Estate and one of the approximately forty self-ruling Imperial Abbeys of the Holy Roman Empire. It was disestablished in 1802/3. The church, known as Stiftskirche St Servatius, is now used by the Lutheran Evangelical Church in Germany.

The castle, abbey, church, and surrounding buildings are exceptionally well preserved and are masterpieces of Romanesque architecture. As a result, and because of their historical importance, the buildings were inscribed on the UNESCO World Heritage List in 1994.

== History ==
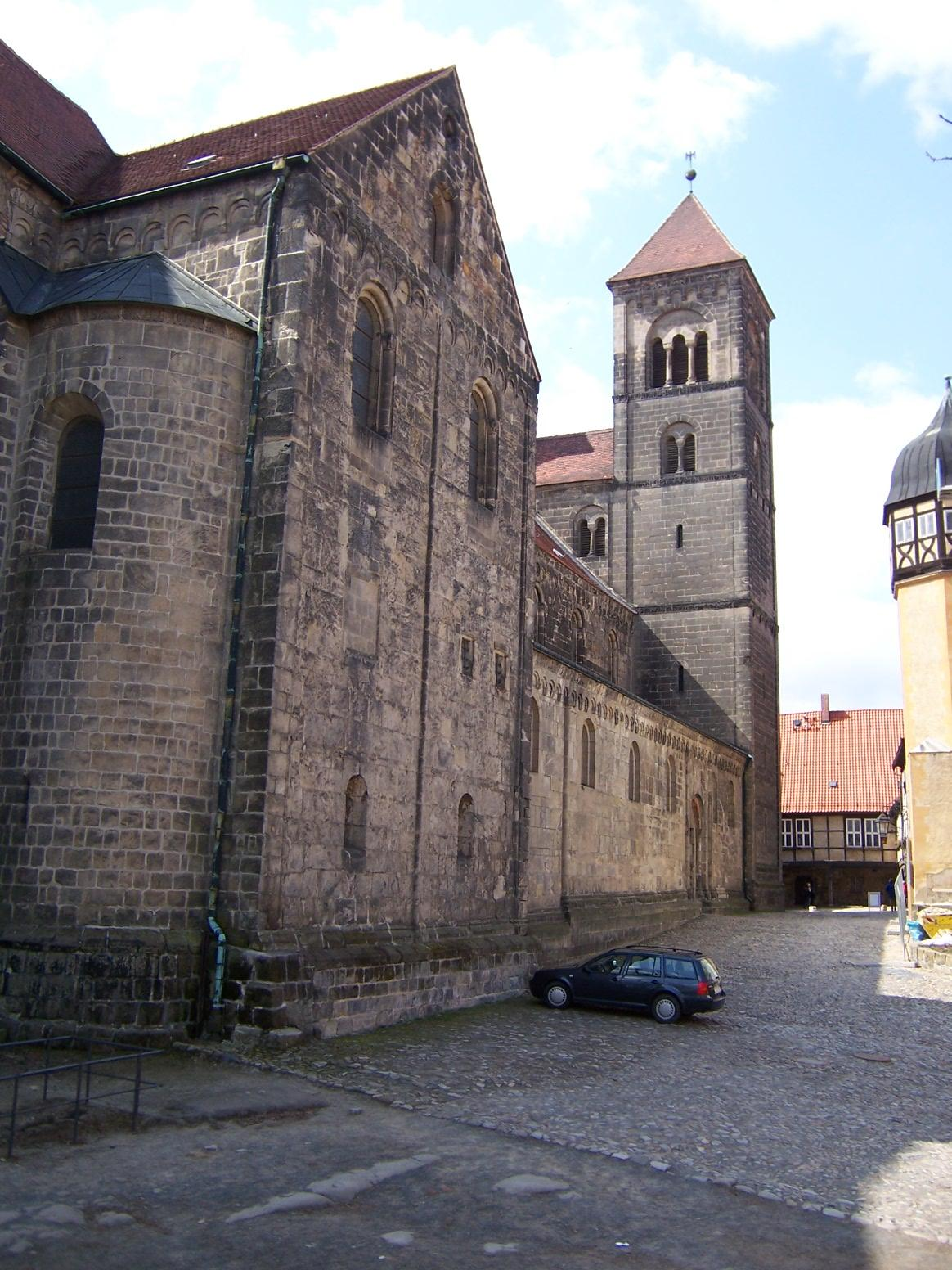
Former collegiate church of St. Servatius in Quedlinburg, now a Lutheran church

Quedlinburg Abbey was founded on the castle hill of Quedlinburg in the present Saxony-Anhalt in 936 by King Otto I, at the request of his mother Queen Mathilda, later canonised as Saint Mathilda, in honour of her late husband, Otto's father, King Henry the Fowler, and as his memorial. Henry was buried here, as was Mathilda herself. In the early and high Middle Ages, next to the abbey there was an imperial palace in Quedlinburg (a Kaiserpfalz), which was often used by the Holy Roman Emperor for Easter celebrations.

The later "Kaiserlich freie weltliche Reichsstift Quedlinburg" ("Free secular Imperial abbey of Quedlinburg"), as its full style was until its dissolution in 1802, consisted of a proprietary church of the Imperial family to which was attached a college of secular canonesses (Stiftsdamen), a community of the unmarried daughters of the greater nobility and royalty leading a godly life. The greatest and most prominent foundations of this sort were Essen Abbey, Gandersheim Abbey, Gernrode Abbey, and Herford Abbey, in the last of which the young Queen Mathilda had been brought up by her grandmother, the abbess. Through the efforts of Queen Mathilda, Quedlinburg Abbey became one of the scholastic centers of Western Europe.

Thanks to its Imperial connections the new foundation attracted rich endowments and was soon a wealthy and thriving community. Ecclesiastically, the abbess was exempt from the jurisdiction of her diocesan, the Bishop of Halberstadt, and subject to no superior except the Pope. The Bishops of Halberstadt were constantly engaged in a dispute with the abbesses, as they claimed to have spiritual jurisdiction over the abbey.

The abbess, as head of an Imperial Abbey, had a seat and voice at the Imperial Diet. She sat on the Bench of the Prelates of the Rhineland of the Ecclesiastical Bench of the College of Ruling Princes.

During the Reformation the abbey became Protestant, under Abbess Anna II (Countess of Stolberg). In the course of the German Mediatisation of 1802 and 1803 the Imperial Abbey was secularized and its territory, properties and subjects were absorbed by the Kingdom of Prussia as the Principality of Quedlinburg. Between 1807 and 1813 it belonged to the short-lived French puppet state Kingdom of Westphalia.

== Endowments ==
=== Lands ===
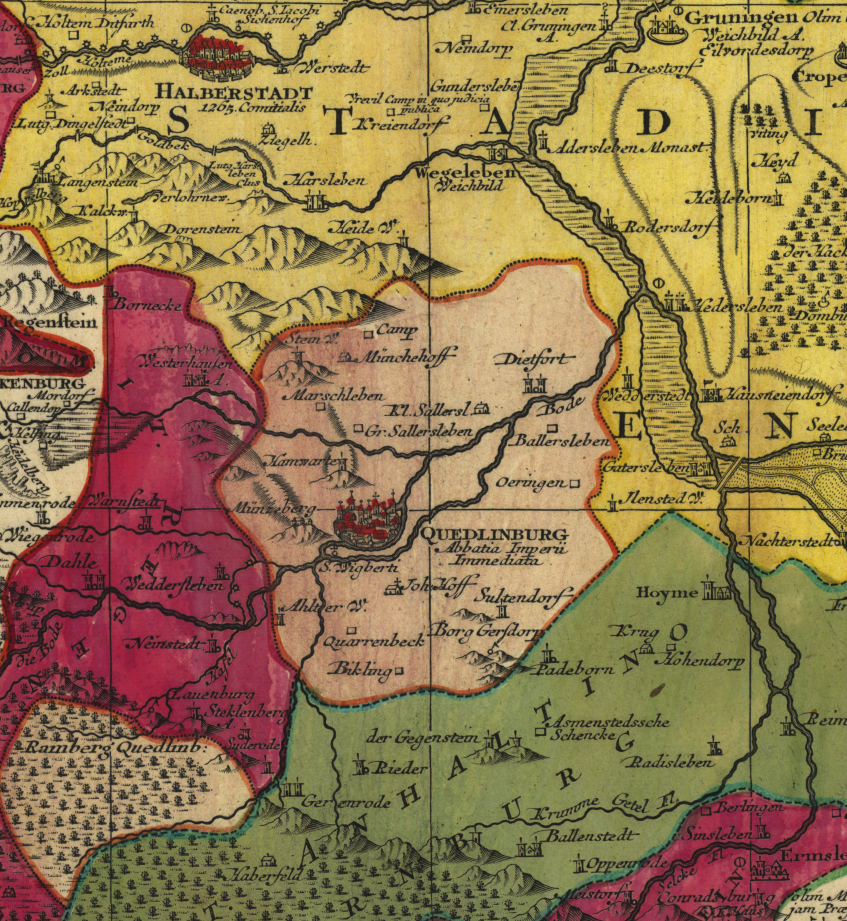
Territory of Quedlinburg Abbey c. 1750

In the first decades after the foundation the community was favoured by numerous gifts of land, particularly from the Imperial family. All later clearances (i.e., of previously uncultivated land) in the immediate vicinity were also theirs, but in addition they acquired far more distant possessions, such as Soltau, 170 kilometres away, given by Otto I in 936.

Among other property the abbey also received the following:

- In 956 the church of Saint Michael next to the cave of Volkmarskeller (near Blankenburg am Harz) was granted them by Otto I (later refounded by abbess Beatrix II as Michaelstein Abbey)
- In 974 the locality of Duderstadt in south-eastern Lower Saxony was acquired, which the abbey owned for 262 years. The village of Breitenfeld bei Duderstadt belonged to the abbey until its dissolution.
- On 3 July 993 a deed of gift was executed by Emperor Otto III granting ownership of Potsdam, of which place this is the first documentary evidence. The deed marks a turning point in the struggle to win back territory east of the Elbe, from which the East Frankish lordship had been driven back by the Slav Uprising of 983.
- In 999 the provincia of Gera came into the hands of the abbey. In 1209 the abbess appointed the Vögte of Weida as administrators of the territory.
- The gifts of Emperor Otto I: 936, 25 estates; 937, two estates; 944, one estate; 946, two estates; 954, one estate; 956, 11 estates; 961, 7 estates.
- The gifts of Emperor Otto II: 974, estates places; 979, one estate; 985, five estates.
- The gifts of Emperor Otto III: 992, three estates; 993, two estates; 995, four estates; 999, one estate.
- Later acquisitions totalled more than 150 estates.

=== Treasury ===
The abbey also received numerous gifts of precious books, manuscripts and liturgical items, which were stored in the treasury. The Deutsche UNESCO-Kommission describes the treasure as "the most valuable medieval church treasure" next to Aachen and Halberstadt.

At the end of World War II a number of the most valuable items were stolen by an American soldier, Joe Tom Meador, including the reliquary of Saint Servatius, from the time of Charles the Bald; the 9th century Samuhel Evangeliary (Samuhel Evangeliar); the printed St. Wipert's Evangeliary (Evangelistar aus St Wiperti) of 1513; and a liturgical ivory comb. The stolen items reappeared in 1987 and after much litigation were returned to the church in 1993.

The most famous illuminated manuscript associated with the town, the 5th-century Quedlinburg Itala fragment, once in the church, had been moved to a museum in Berlin and was not stolen. The Quedlinburg Itala fragment (Berlin, Staatsbibliothek Preussischer Kulturbesitz, Cod. theol. lat. fol. 485) is a fragment of six folios from a large 5th-century illuminated manuscript of an Old Latin Itala translation of parts of 1 Samuel of the Old Testament. It was probably produced in Rome in the 420s or 430s. It is the oldest surviving illustrated biblical manuscript and has been in the Berlin State Library since 1875-76. The pages are approximately 305 x 205 mm large.

The fragments were found from 1865 onwards (two in 1865, two in 1867, one in 1887) re-used in the bindings of different books that had been bound in the 17th century in the town of Quedlinburg, home of Quedlinburg Abbey, a large Imperial monastery, where the manuscript may well have spent much of its life.

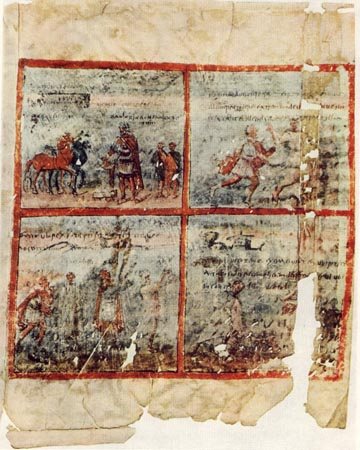
Quedlinburg Itala 1 Kings Chap 15

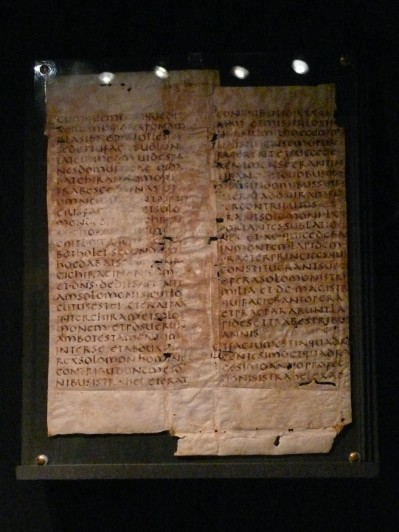
Quedlinburg Itala fragment illustrated text Chapter 15 of 1 Samuel

== Annals ==
The abbey is also known as the home of the Annals of Quedlinburg (Latin: Annales Quedlinburgenses, German: Quedlinburger Annalen), begun in 1008 and finished in 1030 in the abbey, quite possibly by a female writer.

Quedlinburg was well suited for gathering information on current political affairs, given its connections to the Imperial family and the proximity of Magdeburg, an Imperial centre. The "Annals" are mostly concerned with the history of the Holy Roman Empire.

== Abbesses ==
See List of princess-abbesses of Quedlinburg.

== Church buildings ==
St. Servatius
- Collegiate Church of St. Servatius
- Stiftskirche St. Servatii Quedlinburg
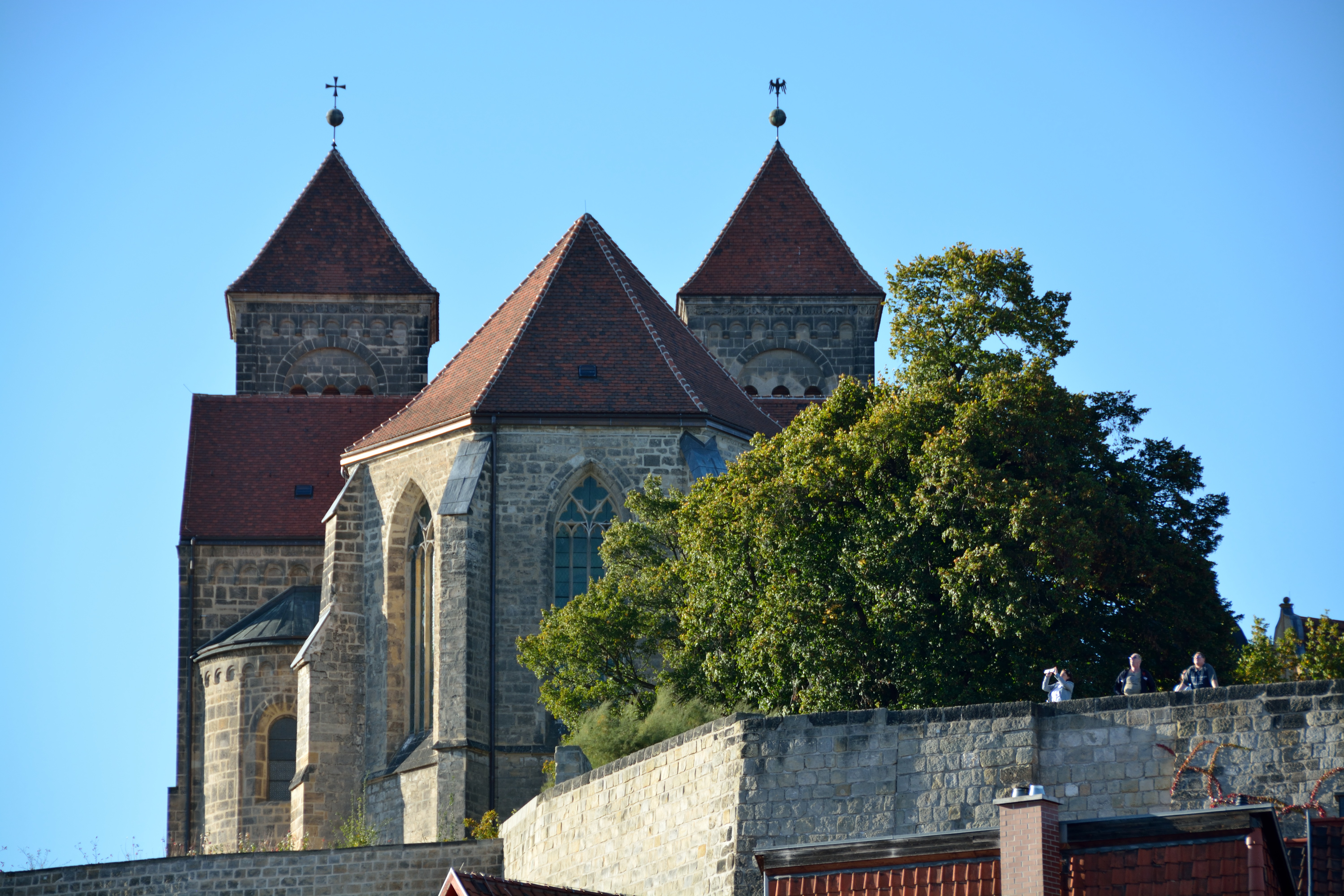

- Location within Germany
- Location: Quedlinburg
- Country: Germany
- Denomination: Lutheran
- Website: Website of the congregation

History
- Founded: 1070 (current building)
- Founder(s): Otto I Queen Mathilda
- Consecrated: 1129 (current building)

Architecture
- Heritage designation: UNESCO World Heritage Site
- Style: Romanesque

The collegiate church or Stiftskirche St. Servatius, is sometimes colloquially referred to in German as Quedlinburger Dom (Quedlinburg Cathedral), although it was never the seat of a bishop. It is dedicated to Saint Servatius of Tongeren and Saint Denis and is a significant Romanesque building.

=== Building history ===
Construction of the three-nave basilica on the remains of three predecessor buildings began sometime before 997 and finished in 1021. The immediate predecessor building where Henry I was initially buried in 936 in front of the main altar had been a small three-aisled church with narrow side aisles. In 961 the remains of St Servatius were brought from Maastricht to Quedlinburg.

The basilica was consecrated in 997. A fire in 1070 caused severe damage. The building was rebuilt in its previous form, and was rededicated in 1129 in the presence of Lothar III. The church contains the architectural feature known as the niedersächsischer Stützenwechsel.

Later alterations included a new choir (c. 1320), the southern wall of the transept (1571) and the southern wall of the nave (1708).

Significant renovation work was done in 1863-82. The western towers were rebuilt. The pulpit was also added at that time and the crypt was given a new front. In 1936-9 changes were made to the choir to make it better suited as a Nazi shrine (also see below under burials). The Gothic structure was internally "returned" to Romanesque style. The church was rededicated in 1945 and restoration work on some part of the church has since been ongoing to this day.

=== Today ===
It is used by the Lutheran Evangelical Church in Germany.

Since 1994, the church has been a World Heritage Site designated by UNESCO. It is also a designated stop on the tourist route Romanesque Road.

=== Burials ===
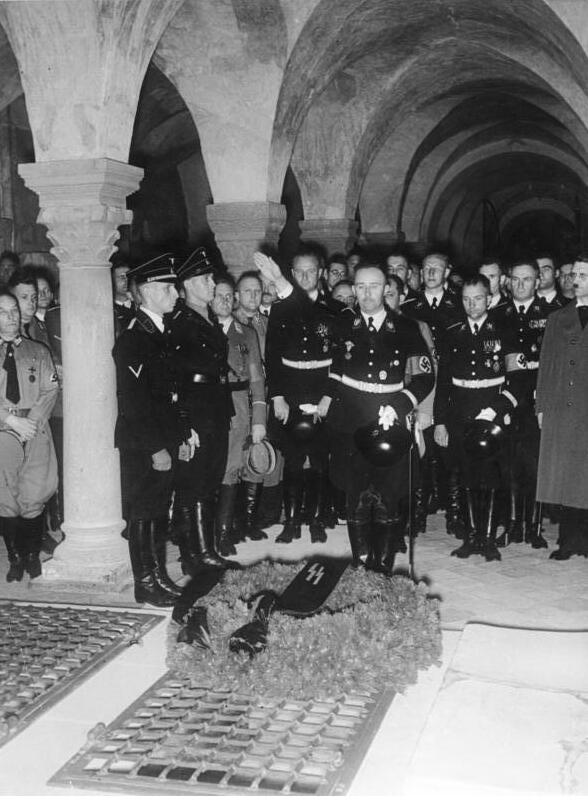
Heinrich Himmler and other senior SS staff in the crypt, 2 July 1938

The graves of Heinrich der Vogler (Henry the Fowler), King of East Francia and his wife Mathilda are located in the crypt of the church. Heinrich's grave only contains a battered empty stone coffin; the whereabouts of the king's remains and time and circumstances of their disappearance are unknown. Under the Nazis, Heinrich Himmler, the Reichsführer SS, came to Quedlinburg several times to hold a ceremony in the crypt on the anniversary of the King's death, 2 July. This started in 1936, 1,000 years after Henry died. Himmler considered him to be the "first German King" and declared his tomb a site of pilgrimage for Germans. During archaeological excavations, the remains of the king were allegedly found and, in 1937, reinterred in a new sarcophagus. After the war, this sarcophagus and its content, a rather clumsy fake, were removed; remains are on display in the museum.

Other burials:

- Adelaide I, Abbess of Quedlinburg
- Beatrice I, Abbess of Quedlinburg
- Adelaide II, Abbess of Quedlinburg

== Sources ==
- Kremer, Marita, 1924. Die Personal- und Amtsdaten der Äbtissinen des Stifts Quedlinburg bis zum Jahre 1574. Leipzig (= Phil. Diss. Univ. Leipzig 1924).
- Wilberg, Max, 1906, repr. 1987. Regententabellen: Eine Zusammenstellung der Herrscher von Ländern aller Erdteile bis zum Beginn des 20. Jahrhunderts. Original edition Frankfurt/Oder, reproduced in facsimile by Transpress VEB Verlag für Vehrkehrswesen, Berlin. ISBN 3-344-00094-2
