= Egbert the One-Eyed =

German count (c.932–994)

- Born: c. 932
- Died: 4 April 994
- Noble family: Billung
- Issue: Wichmann III; Ekbert in Derlingau; Amelung in Padergau
- Father: Wichmann the Elder
- Mother: Frederuna von Westfalen

Egbert the One-Eyed (German: Ekbert der Einäugige) (died 4 April 994) was the second son of Wichmann the Elder and the younger brother of Wichmann the Younger. He was thus of the elder line of the Billung family. His nickname derives from the fact that he lost an eye in battle, an injury for which he blamed Otto I and which partly explains his involvement in many insurrections. He was the count of Hastfalagau.

He sided with Liudolf, Duke of Swabia, in his rebellion in 953–954. He and his brother instigated the Obodrites to war in 955 while Otto was waging war on the Magyars. They escaped judgement in the German campaign that followed. In 978, he was put on trial as an accomplice to the revolt of Henry II, Duke of Bavaria, in the War of the Three Henries and exiled. Egbert assisted Henry in the kidnapping of Otto III and imprisoned Otto's sister Adelaide in his castle at Ala. Through all this, Egbert maintained a very high standing in the kingdom toward the end of his life.
