= Saint Liutberga =

- Miniature of Liutberga from a manuscript copy of her Vita created in the late 15th-century for Abbot Andreas Lang of Michelsberg
- Hometown: Salzburg, Prince-Archbishopric of Salzburg
- Died: c. 870 AD
- Feast: February 28

Saint Liutberga (died c. 870), also spelled Liutbirg and Liutbirga, was an influential nun in Saxony in the 9th century, who ended her life as an anchoress in Windenhausen (or Wendhusen). Her life provides important evidence for female experiences of religion in the ninth-century Carolingian Empire, and also gives some insight into the background of Ottonian convents like Gandersheim and Quedlinburg. A ninth-century saint, Liutberga provided an unexpected new model of holiness, that of the executive housekeeper. St. Liutberga's feast is February 28.

== Life ==
The author of the Vita Liutbergae was a monk of Halberstadt who claimed to have been a personal acquaintance, though the surviving manuscript evidence is late.

Liutberga was first noticed for her talent and intelligence by Gisla. Gisla, eldest daughter of the Saxon count, Hesse, was the widow of Unwan. She had a young son. and had to travel a great deal to supervise his estates and her own. She must have had some previous knowledge of Liutberga's potential for she removed the young woman from a convent and trained her to be her assistant.

Liutberga was initially from Salzburg. Gisla took her into her home and raised her as a daughter, as Gisla told her son Bernhard on her deathbed. Because Gisla funded churches and conducted business in many places, Liutberga travelled with her. Throughout their travels Liutberga was honest, wise, a hard worker, generous in almsgiving, pious and cared for the sick and the dying. Skilled in those diverse arts that pertain to woman's work, and so merciful she was called mother of the poor. During the day Liutberga oversaw her patroness's household and estates, while at night she retired to pray.

Upon her death, Gisla left her inheritance to her son Bernhard, urging him to help restore the church, care for his sisters, and care for Liutberga like a sister. Liutberga lived for a while with Bernhard and cared for his home and family, but she always found time to attend church and she kept vigils all night.

When she grew old she was allowed to retire to the convent of Wendhausen, which had been founded by one of Gisla's widowed daughters. Even there she received many aristocratic visitors from the surrounding area as they wanted her advice and brought their daughters to learn some of her specialised domestic skills. Her career was in fact that of ‘a professional housekeeper and teacher of domestic science’.

She fasted, prayed and helped anyone who came to her in need. Abbots and Bishops took notice and respected her virtues and trusted her to train young women in religion as well as sewing and textile work. She is also said to have had the ability to accurately predict the future. She died around the year 870, an extremely religious and well-respected woman and was given an honored burial in the church.

== Sources ==
- "Online partial translation of Liutberga's Life".
- Valerie L. Garver, 'Learned women? Liutberga and the instruction of Carolingian women', in Lay Intellectuals in the Carolingian World, ed. Nelson and Wormald (Cambridge, 2007)
- Jo Ann McNamara (1996). Sisters in arms: Catholic nuns through two millennia. Harvard University Press. ISBN 067480984X, ISBN 978-0-674-80984-0.
- Anchoress and Abbess in Ninth-century Saxony: The Lives of Liutbirga of Wendhausen and Hathumoda of Gandersheim, translated by F.Paxton (Catholic University of America Press, 2009)
