= Bruno I (bishop of Verden) =

Son of Wichmann the Elder and Frederuna

Bruno (920 – 26 January 976), son of Wichmann the Elder and his wife Frederuna, niece of Queen Matilda, wife of Henry the Fowler, served as a Bishop of Verden.

Bruno was appointed to succeed Bishop Amelung, brother of Hermann Billung, in 962. Bruno is best known for his refusal to allow the burial in the church of Hermann due to his excommunication. Bruno received immunity for the diocese from Emperor Otto I.

According to Thietmar of Merseburg, Hermann's son Bernard, while transporting his father's body to Lüneburg, encountered Bruno and tearfully asked that his father be granted absolution and permitted burial at the church. Bruno refused.

Bruno was held in high regard by the emperor, who had designated him successor to Amelung. Because stone was not available, Amelung had erected and consecrated a magnificent wooden church, surpassing all others in size and quality. Archaeological evidence confirms the description of this church.

As Bruno grew old, Emperor Otto II asked that his chaplain Herman, brother of Folkmar (Volkmar), Archbishop of Cologne, be designated as assistant and heir. Bruno respectfully declined, citing his age and mental condition.
