= Thuringia =

State in Germany

Free State of Thuringia Freistaat Thüringen (German)
- State
- Flag Coat of arms

- Coordinates: 50°51′40″N 11°3′7″E
- Country: Germany
- Capital (and largest city): Erfurt

Government
  - Body: Landtag of Thuringia
  - Minister-President: Mario Voigt (CDU)
  - Governing parties: CDU / Thüringen.Gerecht / SPD
  - Bundesrat votes: 4 (of 69)
  - Bundestag seats: 18 (of 630) (as of 2025)

Area
  - Total: 16,202.37 km^{2} (6,255.77 sq mi)

Population (2023-12-31)
  - Total: 2,122,335
  - Density: 130.9892/km^{2} (339.2604/sq mi)
- Demonym: Thuringian

GDP
  - Total: €80.639 billion (2025)
  - Per capita: €38,394 (2025)
- Time zone: UTC+1 (CET)
  - Summer (DST): UTC+2 (CEST)
- ISO 3166 code: DE-TH
- NUTS Region: DEG
- HDI (2022): 0.928 very high · 13th of 16
- Website: thueringen.de

Map

Thuringia (/θəˈrɪndʒiə/; German: Thüringen [ˈtyːʁɪŋən] officially the Free State of Thuringia, Freistaat Thüringen [ˈfʁaɪʃtaːt ˈtyːʁɪŋən]) is a landlocked state in Germany, indeed the country's centermost state. With 2.1 million people, it is the 12th-largest of Germany's 16 states by population, and with 16,171 square kilometers (6,244 sq mi) the 11th-largest in area.

Erfurt is the capital and largest city. Other cities include Jena, Gera and Weimar. Thuringia is bordered by Bavaria, Hesse, Lower Saxony, Saxony, and Saxony-Anhalt. It has been known as "the green heart of Germany" (das grüne Herz Deutschlands) from the late 19th century due to its broad, dense forest. Most of Thuringia is in the Saale drainage basin, a left-bank tributary of the Elbe.

The Frankish Duchy of Thuringia was established around 631 AD by King Dagobert I. The modern state was established in 1920 by the Weimar Republic through a merger of the Ernestine duchies, save for Saxe-Coburg. After World War II, Thuringia came under the Soviet occupation zone in Allied-occupied Germany, and its borders were reformed, to become contiguous. Thuringia became part of the German Democratic Republic in 1949, but was dissolved in 1952 during administrative reforms, and divided into the Districts of Erfurt, Suhl and Gera. Thuringia was re-established in 1990 following German reunification, slightly re-drawn, and became one of the new states of the Federal Republic of Germany.

Thuringia is home to the Rennsteig, Germany's best-known hiking trail. Its winter resort of Oberhof makes it a well-equipped winter sports destination – half of Germany's 136 Winter Olympic gold medals had been won by Thuringian athletes as of 2014. Thuringia was favoured by or was the birthplace of three key intellectuals and leaders in the arts: Johann Sebastian Bach, Johann Wolfgang von Goethe, and Friedrich Schiller. The state is home to the University of Jena, the Ilmenau University of Technology, the University of Erfurt, Bauhaus University of Weimar and the Schmalkalden University of Applied Sciences.

== Etymology and symbols ==
The name Thuringia or Thüringen derives from the Germanic tribe Thuringii, who emerged during the Migration Period. Their origin is largely unknown. An older theory claims that they were successors of the Hermunduri, but later research rejected the idea. Other historians argue that the Thuringians were allies of the Huns, came to central Europe together with them, and lived before in what is Galicia today. Publius Flavius Vegetius Renatus first mentioned the Thuringii around 400; during that period, the Thuringii were famous for their excellent horses.

The Thuringian Realm existed until after 531. The Landgraviate of Thuringia was the largest state in the region, persisting between 1131 and 1247. Afterwards the state known as Thuringia ceased to exist; nevertheless the term commonly described the region between the Harz mountains in the north, the White Elster river in the east, the Franconian Forest in the south and the Werra river in the west. After the Treaty of Leipzig, Thuringia had its own dynasty again, the Ernestine Wettins. Their various lands formed the State of Thuringia, founded in 1920, together with some other small principalities. The Prussian territories around Erfurt, Mühlhausen and Nordhausen joined Thuringia in 1945.

The coat of arms of Thuringia shows the lion of the Ludowingian Landgraves of 12th-century origin. The eight stars around it represent the eight former states which formed Thuringia. The flag of Thuringia is a white-red bicolor, derived from the white and red stripes of the Ludowingian lion. The coat of arms and flag of Hesse are quite similar to the Thuringian ones, since they are also derived from the Ludowingian symbols.

During the 15th century, additional coat of arms for the Count Palatine of Thuringia (German: Pfalzgraf von Thüringen) was created in order to strengthen positions of Thuringian landgraves from the House of Wettin in regions between their Thuringian and Saxon domains, thus leading to the inclusion of Thuringian-palatine symbols into the Wettin coats of arms.

Symbols of Thuringia in popular culture are the Thüringer Rostbratwurst and the Thuringian Forest, because a large amount of the territory is forested.

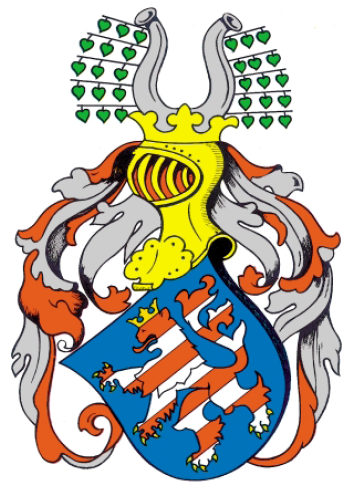
Coat of arms of the Landgraviate of Thuringia (1265)

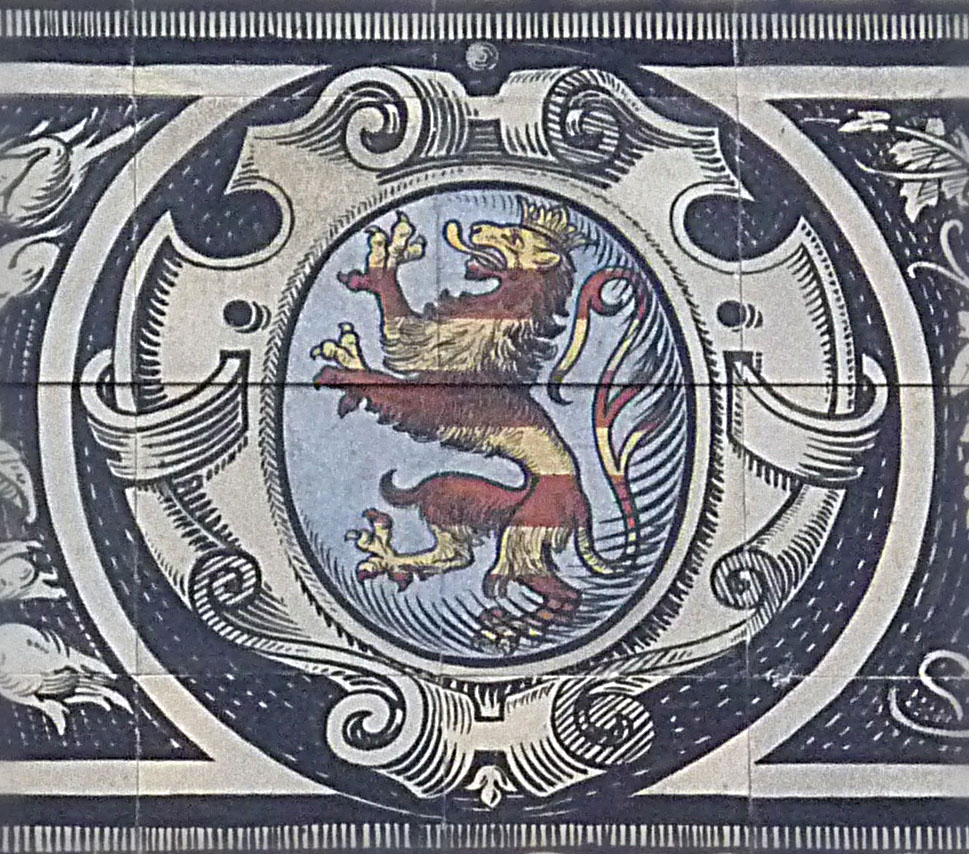
Thuringian landgravian lion, depicted in the Fürstenzug

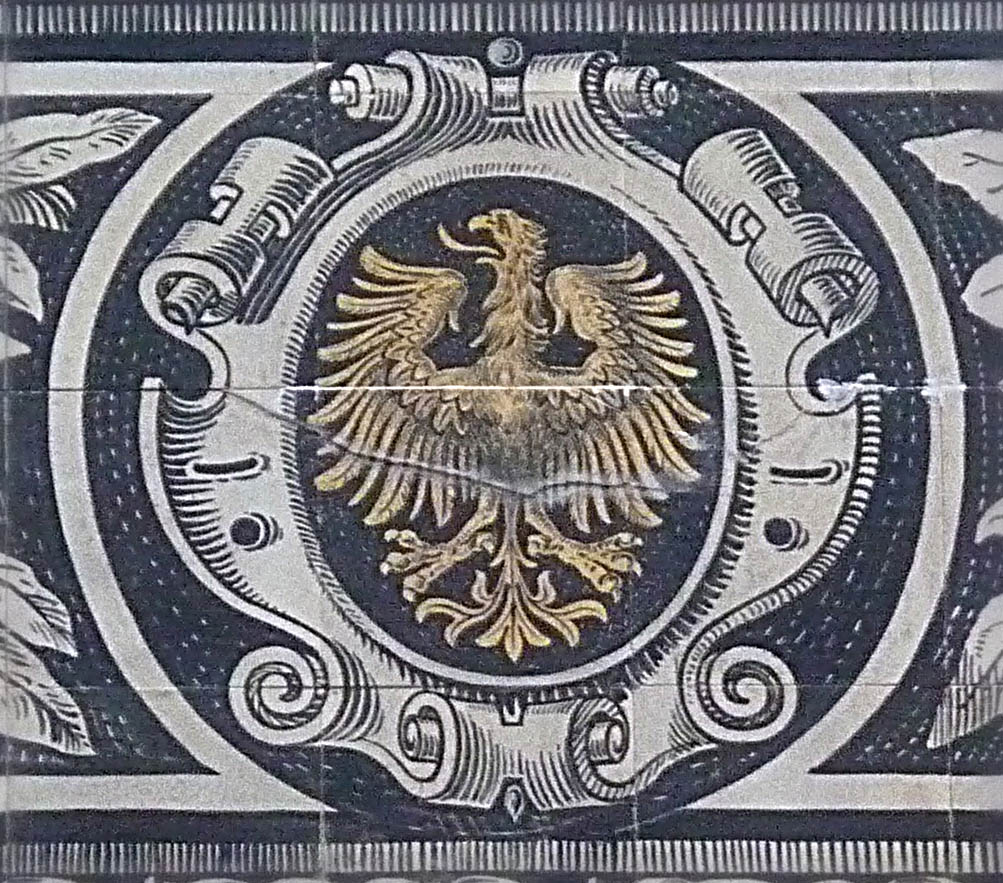
Thuringian palatine eagle, depicted in the Fürstenzug

== History ==
Thuringia (blue) and neighboring regions in the 11th century

Named after the Thuringi, a Germanic tribe that occupied the region around AD 300, Thuringia came under Frankish domination in the 6th century. The first documented duke of Thuringia was a local noble named Radulf I, who was appointed by the king Dagobert I in the early 630s. At that time, the Franks were in conflict with the Slavic tribal alliance that included Thuringian neighbors, the Sorbs. Duke Radulf was able to secure the Thuringian borders along the river Saale from Slavic incursions, but he later (641/642) rebelled against Dagobert's successor, king Sigebert III, and even declared himself king (rex) of Thuringia, concluding treaties with Slavs and other peoples.

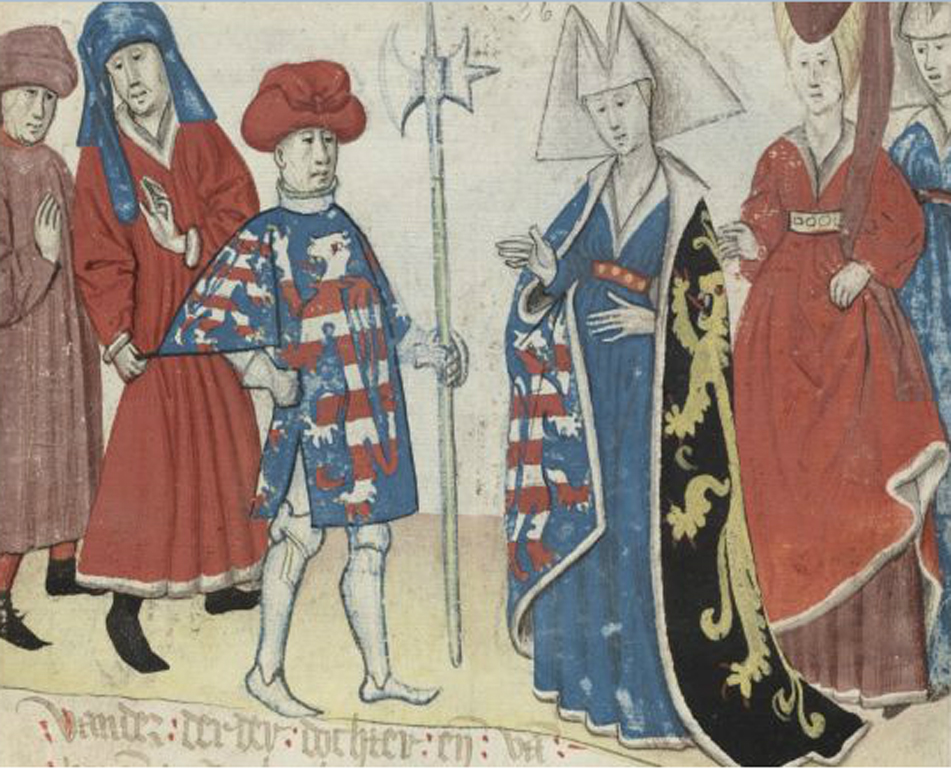
Marriage of the Thuringian landgrave Henry Raspe and Beatrice of Brabant

Later Thuringian dukes were subjects of Frankish rulers, and by the middle of the 9th century, within the Carolingian Empire and its East Frankish Realm (after the 843 Treaty of Verdun), eastern borders of Thuringia were organized as the Limes Sorabicus, and placed under duke Thachulf.

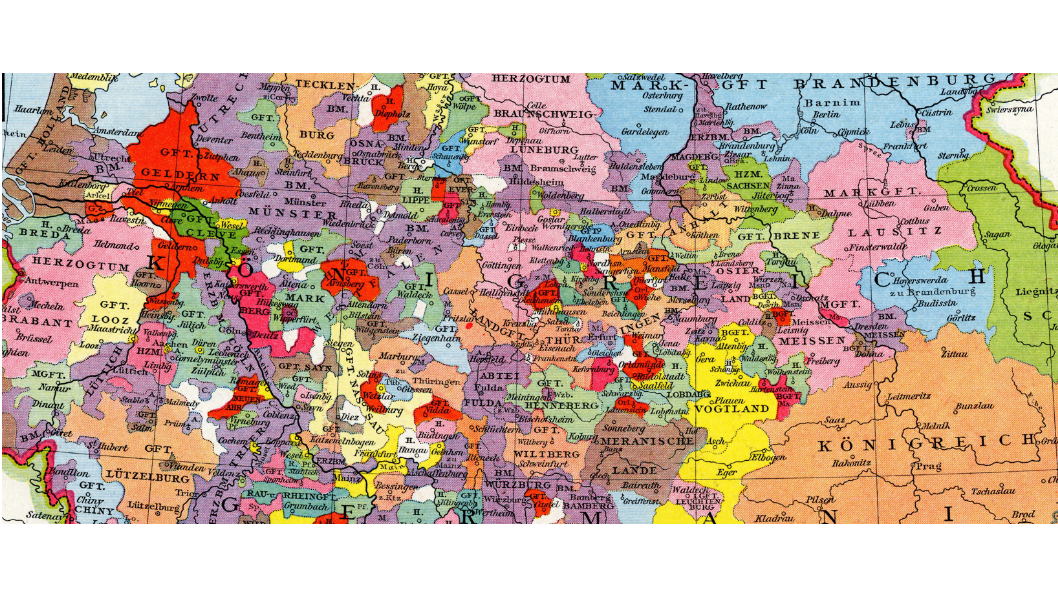
Feudal fragmentation of Thuringia and neighboring regions in the 13th century

Within the Holy Roman Empire, Thuringia became a landgraviate in 1130, and by that time several Thuringian counties were also merged or divided (counties of Weimar, Orlamünde and others), leading to frequent recompositions and ultimately to fragmentation of Thuringian domains. In 1246, Thuringian landgrave Henry Raspe (d. 1247) was proclaimed King of the Romans, but failed to secure the throne. After the extinction of the reigning Ludowingian line of counts and landgraves in 1247 and the War of the Thuringian Succession (1247–1264), the western half became independent under the name of "Hesse", never to reunite with Thuringia again. The remaining Landgraviate of Thuringia came under the rule of the Wettin dynasty of the neighboring Margraviate of Meissen and the Palatinate of Saxony.

In 1423, the Wettins also acquired the Electorate of Saxony, and during the course of the 15th century they also claimed to hold the Palatinate of Thuringia (German: Pfalzgrafschaft Thüringen), a newly coined designation, created in order to strengthen Wettin positions in regions between their Thuringian and Saxon domains. With the division of the house of Wettin in 1485 (Treaty of Leipzig), southern and central parts of Thuringia went to the senior Ernestine branch of the family, while northern parts went to the junior Albertine branch.

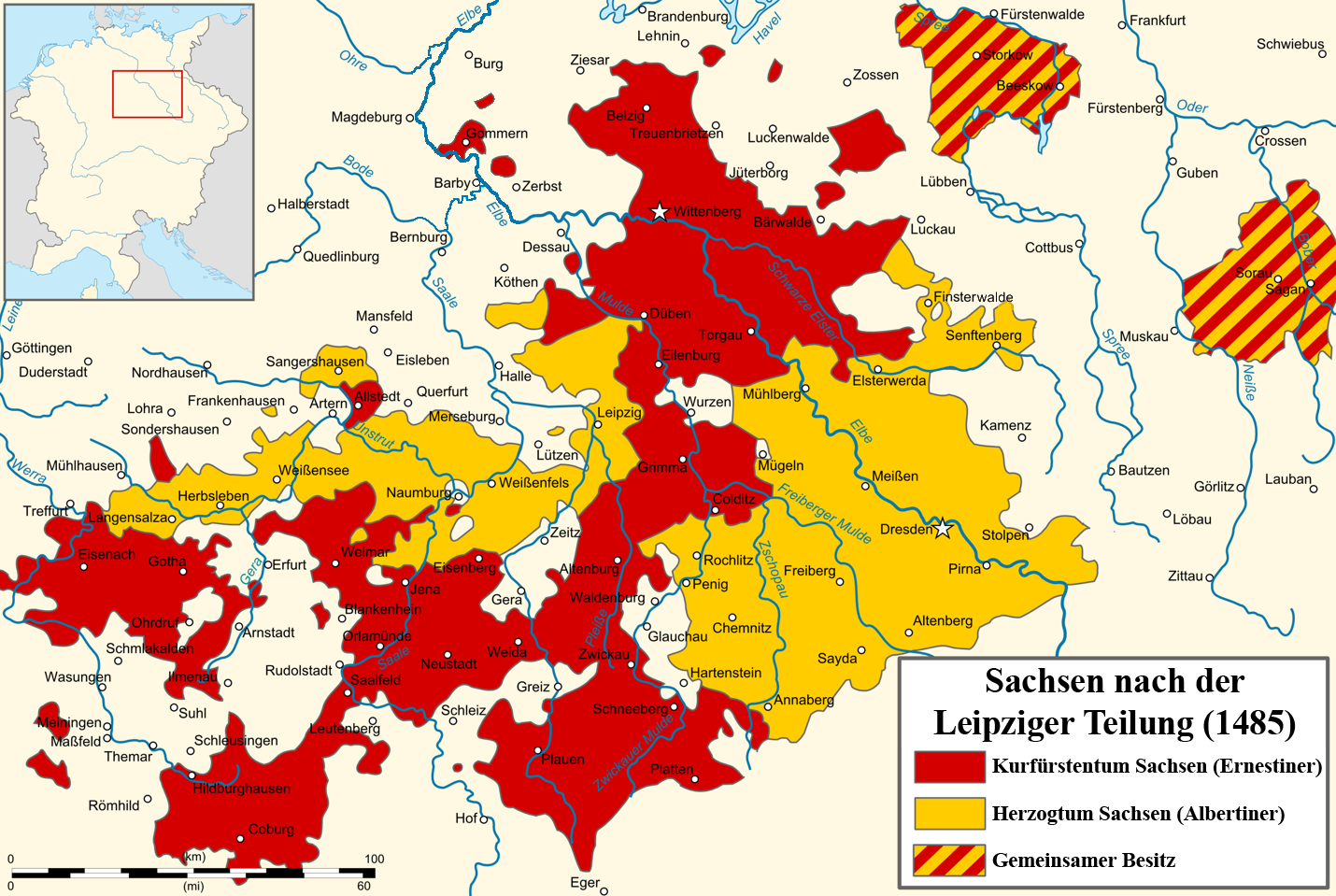
Ernestine (red) and Albertine (yellow) domains upon the Treaty of Leipzig (1485)

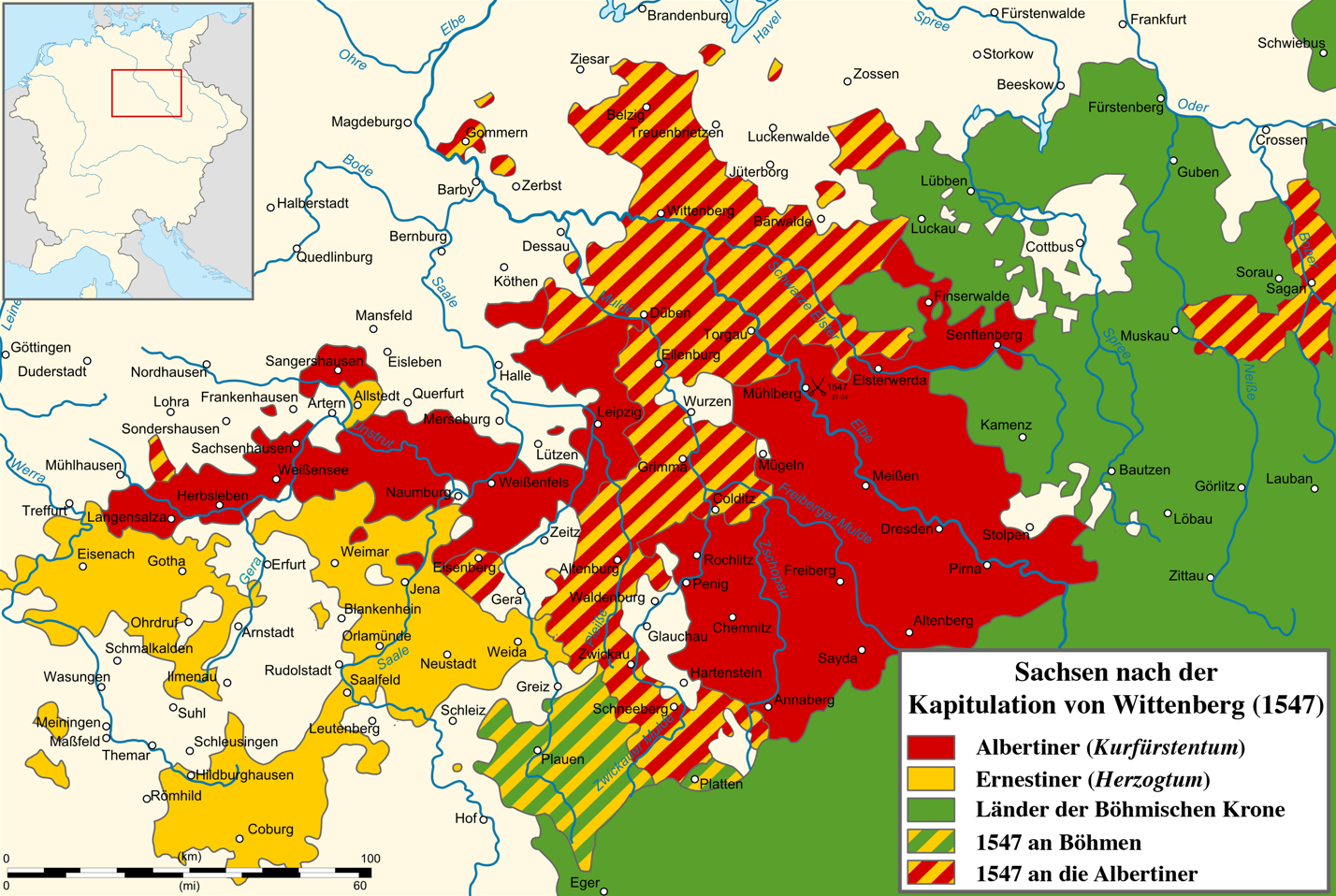
Ernestine (yellow) and Albertine (red) domains upon the Capitulation of Wittenberg (1547)

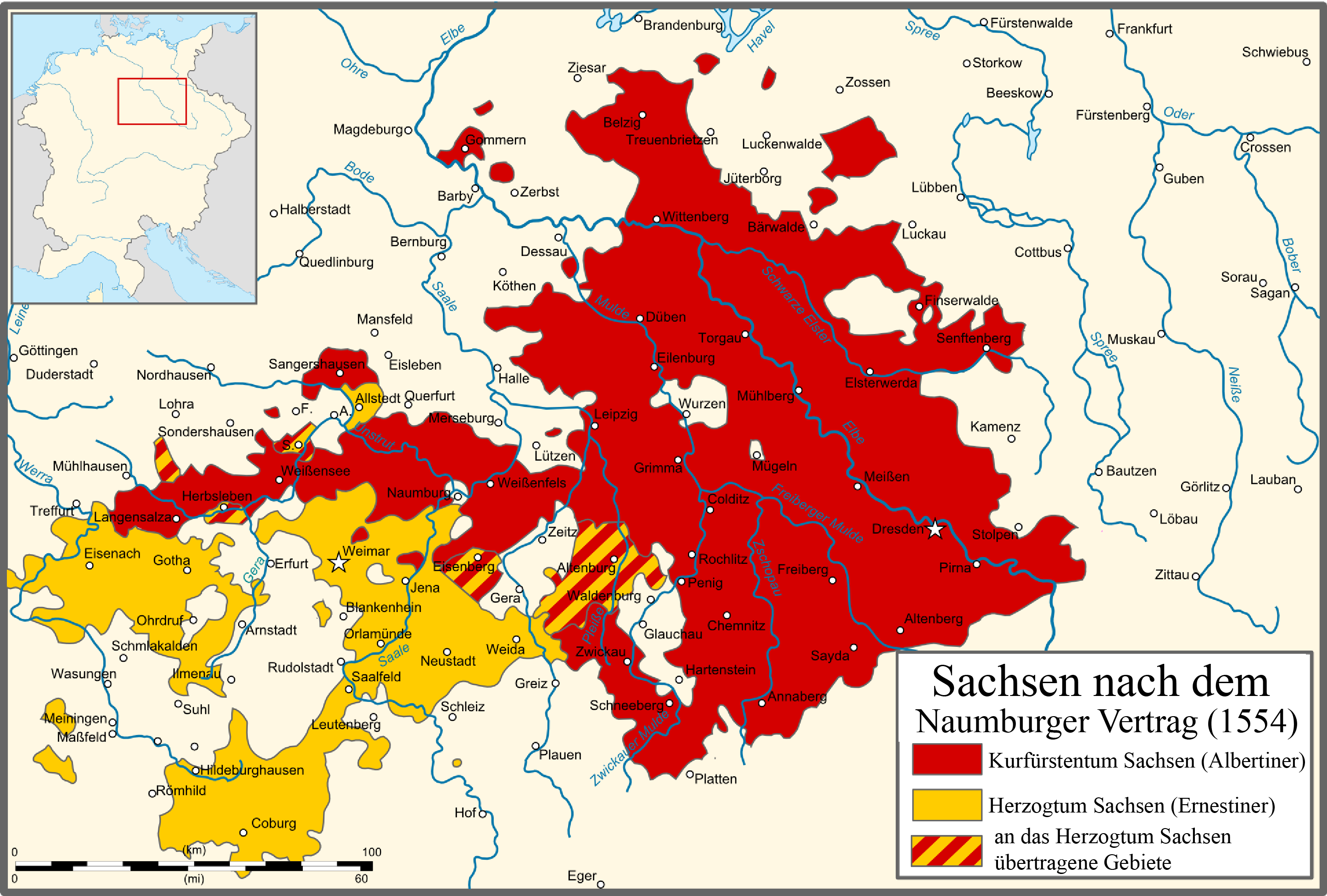
Ernestine (yellow) and Albertine (red) domains upon the Treaty of Naumburg (1554)

=== Early modern period ===
Map of the Thuringian States in 1680

Map of the Thuringian States in 1910

Thuringia generally accepted the Protestant Reformation, and Roman Catholicism was suppressed as early as 1520; priests who remained loyal to it were driven away and churches and monasteries were largely destroyed, especially during the German Peasants' War of 1525. In Mühlhausen and elsewhere, the Anabaptists found many adherents. Thomas Müntzer, a leader of some non-peaceful groups of this sect, was active in this city. Within the borders of modern Thuringia the Roman Catholic faith only survived in the Eichsfeld district, which was ruled by the Archbishop of Mainz, and to a small degree in Erfurt and its immediate vicinity.

In 1547, under the Capitulation of Wittenberg, the Ernestines lost the Saxon Electorate, but kept most of their Thuringian domains. According to the Saxon tradition of dividing inheritance amongst male heirs, the remaining Ernestine domains in Thuringia were subsequently subdivided into a number of smaller states. These were the "Ernestine duchies", also known as the Saxon duchies, since their rulers derived their ducal titles from the Saxon ducal traditions. Ernestine states that emerged in Thuringia were, among others: Saxe-Weimar, Saxe-Eisenach, Saxe-Jena, Saxe-Meiningen, Saxe-Altenburg, Saxe-Coburg, and Saxe-Gotha.

The modern German black-red-gold tricolour flag's first appearance anywhere in a German-ethnicity sovereign state, within what today comprises Germany, occurred in 1778 as the state flag of the Principality of Reuss-Greiz, a defunct principality within the modern state's borders.

Some reordering of the Thuringian states occurred during the German Mediatisation from 1795 to 1814, and the territory was included within the Napoleonic Confederation of the Rhine organized in 1806. The 1815 Congress of Vienna confirmed these changes and the Thuringian states' inclusion in the German Confederation; the Kingdom of Prussia also acquired some Thuringian territory and administered it within the Province of Saxony. The Thuringian duchies which became part of the German Empire in 1871 during the Prussian-led unification of Germany were Saxe-Weimar-Eisenach, Saxe-Meiningen, Saxe-Altenburg, Saxe-Coburg-Gotha, Schwarzburg-Sondershausen, Schwarzburg-Rudolstadt and the two principalities of Reuss Elder Line and Reuss Younger Line.

=== Free State of Thuringia ===
In 1920, after World War I, these small states merged into one state, called the State of Thuringia (Land Thüringen); only Saxe-Coburg voted to join Bavaria instead. Weimar became the new capital. The coat of arms of this new state was simpler than those of its predecessors. The Landtag of the newly established state first convened in 1920 in Weimar. Its deputies were elected for three years according to proportional representation, with a minimum voting age of 21. Between 1920 and 1932, under the Weimar Republic, six Landtag elections were held.

Thuringia was one of the states where the Nazi Party first gained real political power during the Weimar Republic. Wilhelm Frick was appointed Minister of the Interior in the state coalition government after the Nazi Party won six deputies to the Thuringian Landtag in the December 1929 election. In this position, he removed from the Thuringian police force anyone he suspected of being a republican and replaced them with men who were favourable towards the Nazis. He also ensured that, whenever an important position came up within Thuringia, a Nazi was given that post. Following the Nazi seizure of power in Berlin, the Landtag was formally abolished as a result of the "Law on the Reconstruction of the Reich" of 30 January 1934, which replaced the German federal system with a unitary state. Thuringia was the location of the Buchenwald concentration camp with multiple subcamps.

After being controlled briefly by the US following the end of the Second World War, from July 1945 the state of Thuringia came under the Soviet occupation zone and was expanded to include parts of Prussian Saxony, such as the areas around Erfurt, Mühlhausen, and Nordhausen. Erfurt became the new capital of Thuringia. Ostheim, an exclave of Landkreis Eisenach, was ceded to Bavaria.

In 1952, the German Democratic Republic dissolved its states, and created districts (Bezirke) instead. The three districts that shared the former territory of Thuringia were Erfurt, Gera and Suhl. Altenburg Kreis was part of Leipzig Bezirk.

The present Free State of Thuringia was recreated with slightly altered borders during German reunification in 1990.

== Geography ==
=== Topography ===
From the northwest going clockwise; Thuringia borders on the German states of Lower Saxony, Saxony-Anhalt, Saxony, Bavaria and Hesse.

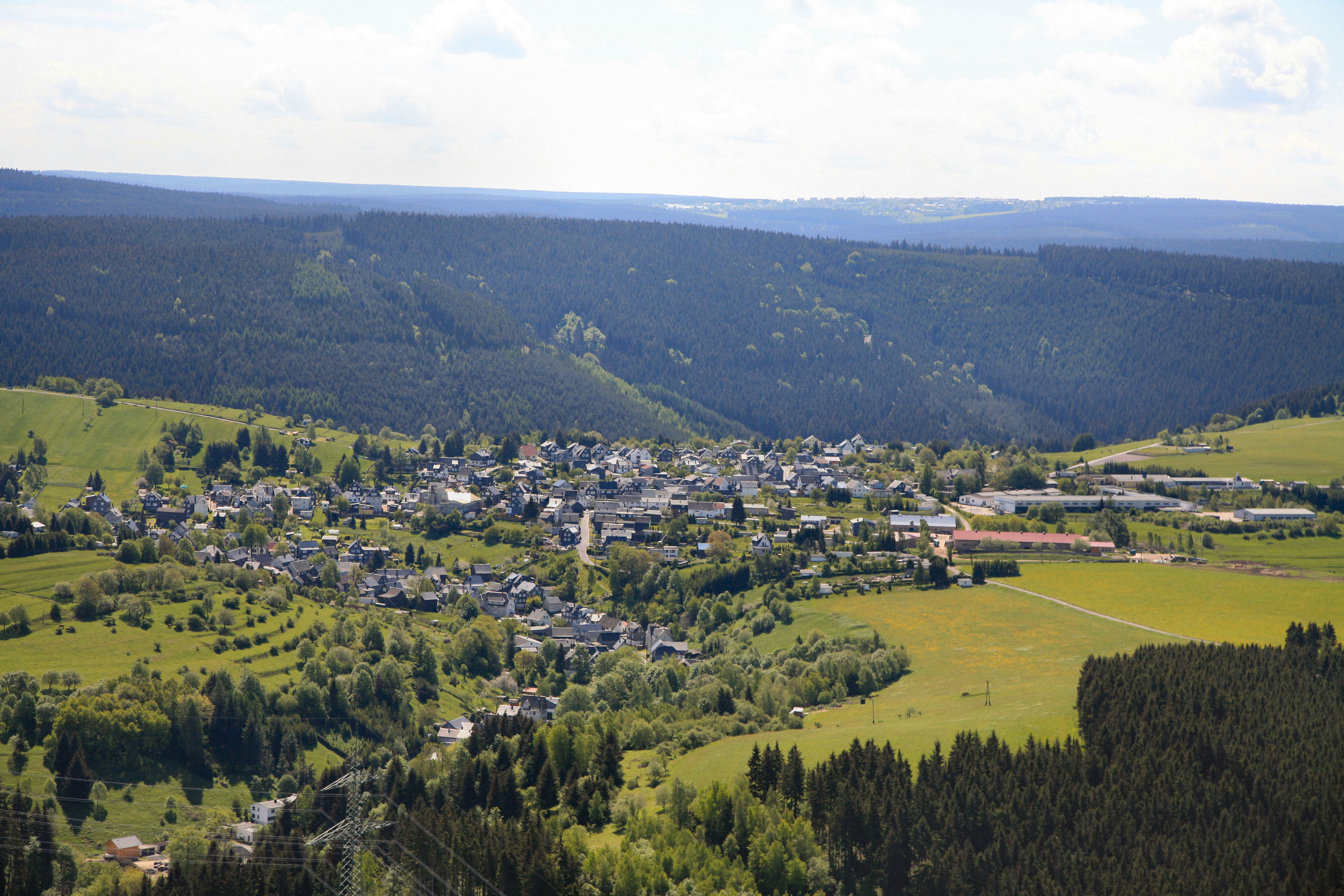
Meuselbach-Schwarzmühle at the Thuringian Highland

The landscapes of Thuringia are quite diverse. The far north is occupied by the Harz mountains, followed by the Goldene Aue, a fertile floodplain around Nordhausen with the Helme as most important river. The north-west includes the Eichsfeld, a hilly and sometimes forested region, where the Leine river emanates. The central and northern part of Thuringia is defined by the 3,000 km^{2} (1,200 sq mi) wide Thuringian Basin, a very fertile and flat area around the Unstrut river and completely surrounded by the following hill chains (clockwise from the north-west): Dün, Hainleite, Windleite, Kyffhäuser, Hohe Schrecke, Schmücke, Finne, Ettersberg, Steigerwald, Thuringian Forest, Hörselberge and Hainich. Within the Basin the smaller hill chains Fahner Höhe and Heilinger Höhen. South of the Thuringian Basin is the state's largest mountain range, marked by the Thuringian Forest in the north-west, the Thuringian Highland in the middle and the Franconian Forest in the south-east. Most of this range is forested and the Großer Beerberg (983 m) is Thuringia's highest mountain. To the south-west, the Forest is followed up by Werra river valley, dividing it from the Rhön Mountains in the west and the Grabfeld plain in the south. Eastern Thuringia, commonly described as the area east of Saale and Loquitz valley, is marked by a hilly landscape, rising slowly from the flat north to the mountainous south. The Saale in the west and the White Elster in the east are the two big rivers running from south to north and forming densely settled valleys in this area. Between them lies the flat and forested Holzland in the north, the flat and fertile Orlasenke in the middle and the Vogtland, a hilly but in most parts non-forested region in the south. The far eastern region (east of White Elster) is the Osterland or Altenburger Land along Pleiße river, a flat, fertile and densely settled agricultural area.

There are two large rivers in Thuringia. The Saale, a tributary of the Elbe, with its tributaries the Unstrut, Ilm and White Elster, drains the most part of Thuringia. The Werra – the headwater of the Weser – drains the south-west and west of the state. Furthermore, some small areas on the southern border are drained by tributaries of the Main, itself a tributary of the Rhine. There are no large natural lakes in Thuringia, but it does have some of Germany's biggest dams, including the Bleiloch Dam and the Hohenwarte Dam on the River Saale, as well as the Leibis-Lichte Dam and the Goldisthal Pumped Storage Station in the Thuringian Highlands. Thuringia is Germany's only state with no connection to navigable waterways.

The geographic centre of the Federal Republic is in Thuringia, within the municipality of Vogtei next to Mühlhausen. The centre of Thuringia is eight kilometres south of the capital's Cathedral, in the municipality of Rockhausen.

=== Climate ===
Thuringia's climate is temperate with humid westerly winds predominating. Increasingly as one moves from the north-west to the south-east, the climate shows continental features: winters can be cold for long periods, and summers can become warm. Dry periods are often recorded, especially within the Thuringian Basin, leeward to mountains in all directions. It is Germany's driest area, with annual precipitation of only 400 to 500 mm.

Artern, in the north-east, is warm and dry, with a mean annual temperature of 8.5 °C and mean precipitation of 450 mm; contrast this with wet, cool Oberhof, in the Thuringian Forest, where temperature averages only 4.4 °C and mean annual precipitation reaches 1300 mm.

Climate data for Erfurt–Weimar Airport, 1991–2020 normals, extremes 1951–present
Month	Jan	Feb	Mar	Apr	May	Jun	Jul	Aug	Sep	Oct	Nov	Dec	Year
Record high °C (°F)	15.8 (60.4)	19.0 (66.2)	24.2 (75.6)	29.6 (85.3)	31.4 (88.5)	37.9 (100.2)	37.6 (99.7)	36.3 (97.3)	32.2 (90.0)	26.6 (79.9)	20.8 (69.4)	17.4 (63.3)	37.9 (100.2)
Mean maximum °C (°F)	10.5 (50.9)	12.3 (54.1)	17.3 (63.1)	22.6 (72.7)	26.5 (79.7)	29.8 (85.6)	31.5 (88.7)	31.5 (88.7)	26.2 (79.2)	21.2 (70.2)	14.9 (58.8)	11.4 (52.5)	33.4 (92.1)
Mean daily maximum °C (°F)	2.7 (36.9)	4.1 (39.4)	8.4 (47.1)	13.8 (56.8)	17.7 (63.9)	21.1 (70.0)	23.6 (74.5)	23.6 (74.5)	18.7 (65.7)	13.1 (55.6)	7.2 (45.0)	3.6 (38.5)	13.1 (55.6)
Daily mean °C (°F)	0.2 (32.4)	0.9 (33.6)	4.3 (39.7)	8.8 (47.8)	12.9 (55.2)	16.1 (61.0)	18.3 (64.9)	18.1 (64.6)	13.8 (56.8)	9.1 (48.4)	4.4 (39.9)	1.2 (34.2)	9.0 (48.2)
Mean daily minimum °C (°F)	−2.5 (27.5)	−2.3 (27.9)	0.3 (32.5)	3.5 (38.3)	7.4 (45.3)	10.8 (51.4)	12.8 (55.0)	12.7 (54.9)	9.1 (48.4)	5.4 (41.7)	1.6 (34.9)	−1.4 (29.5)	4.8 (40.6)
Mean minimum °C (°F)	−12.4 (9.7)	−10.7 (12.7)	−5.9 (21.4)	−3.2 (26.2)	1.0 (33.8)	5.1 (41.2)	7.8 (46.0)	6.8 (44.2)	3.1 (37.6)	−1.4 (29.5)	−5.4 (22.3)	−10.1 (13.8)	−14.8 (5.4)
Record low °C (°F)	−25.0 (−13.0)	−24.6 (−12.3)	−20.2 (−4.4)	−10.4 (13.3)	−2.9 (26.8)	0.0 (32.0)	3.3 (37.9)	3.7 (38.7)	−0.6 (30.9)	−7.6 (18.3)	−18.6 (−1.5)	−23.5 (−10.3)	−25.0 (−13.0)
Average precipitation mm (inches)	25.0 (0.98)	22.9 (0.90)	36.3 (1.43)	34.2 (1.35)	63.9 (2.52)	55.7 (2.19)	80.8 (3.18)	58.7 (2.31)	45.8 (1.80)	37.6 (1.48)	41.1 (1.62)	32.6 (1.28)	534.7 (21.05)
Average extreme snow depth cm (inches)	7.4 (2.9)	6.6 (2.6)	4.3 (1.7)	0.8 (0.3)	0 (0)	0 (0)	0 (0)	0 (0)	0 (0)	0.4 (0.2)	1.7 (0.7)	6.7 (2.6)	13.1 (5.2)
Average precipitation days (≥ 0.1 mm)	15.0	13.1	14.8	11.8	13.8	13.2	14.9	13.0	12.0	13.9	14.3	15.3	165.0
Average snowy days (≥ 1.0 cm)	11.7	9.5	4.3	0.3	0	0	0	0	0	0.2	2.0	7.3	35.4
Average relative humidity (%)	85.7	82.4	77.7	70.7	72.1	72.4	70.1	69.2	76.2	82.8	87.0	87.2	77.8
Mean monthly sunshine hours	59.7	80.6	128.7	184.8	211.9	219.8	224.7	210.4	159.3	112.4	60.7	47.0	1,706.5
Source 1: NOAA
Source 2: Deutscher Wetterdienst / SKlima.de

=== Nature and environment ===
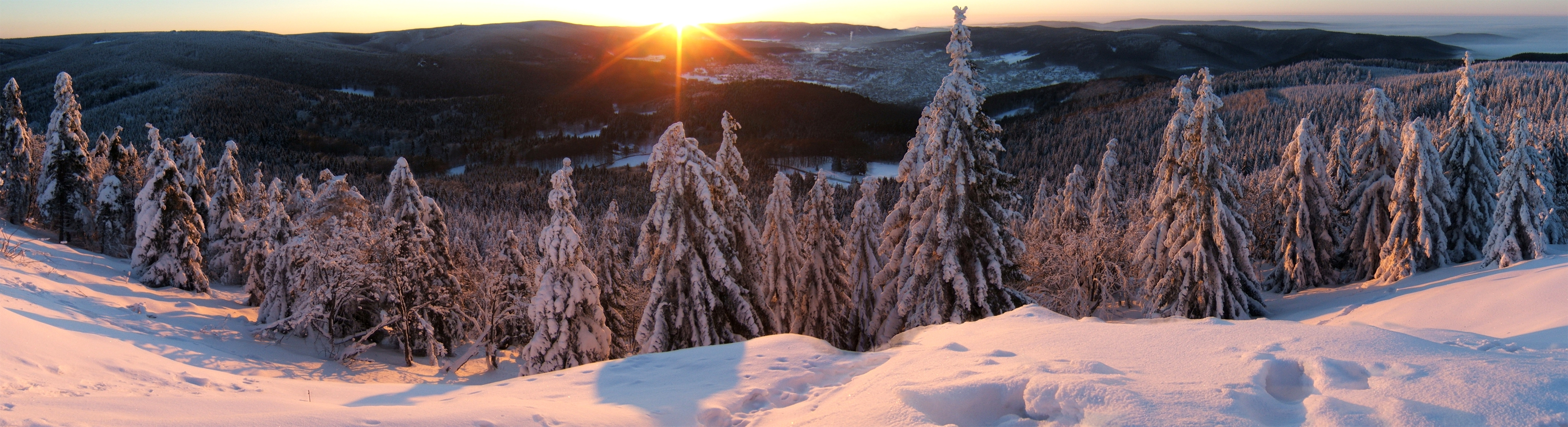
Thuringian Forest in winter

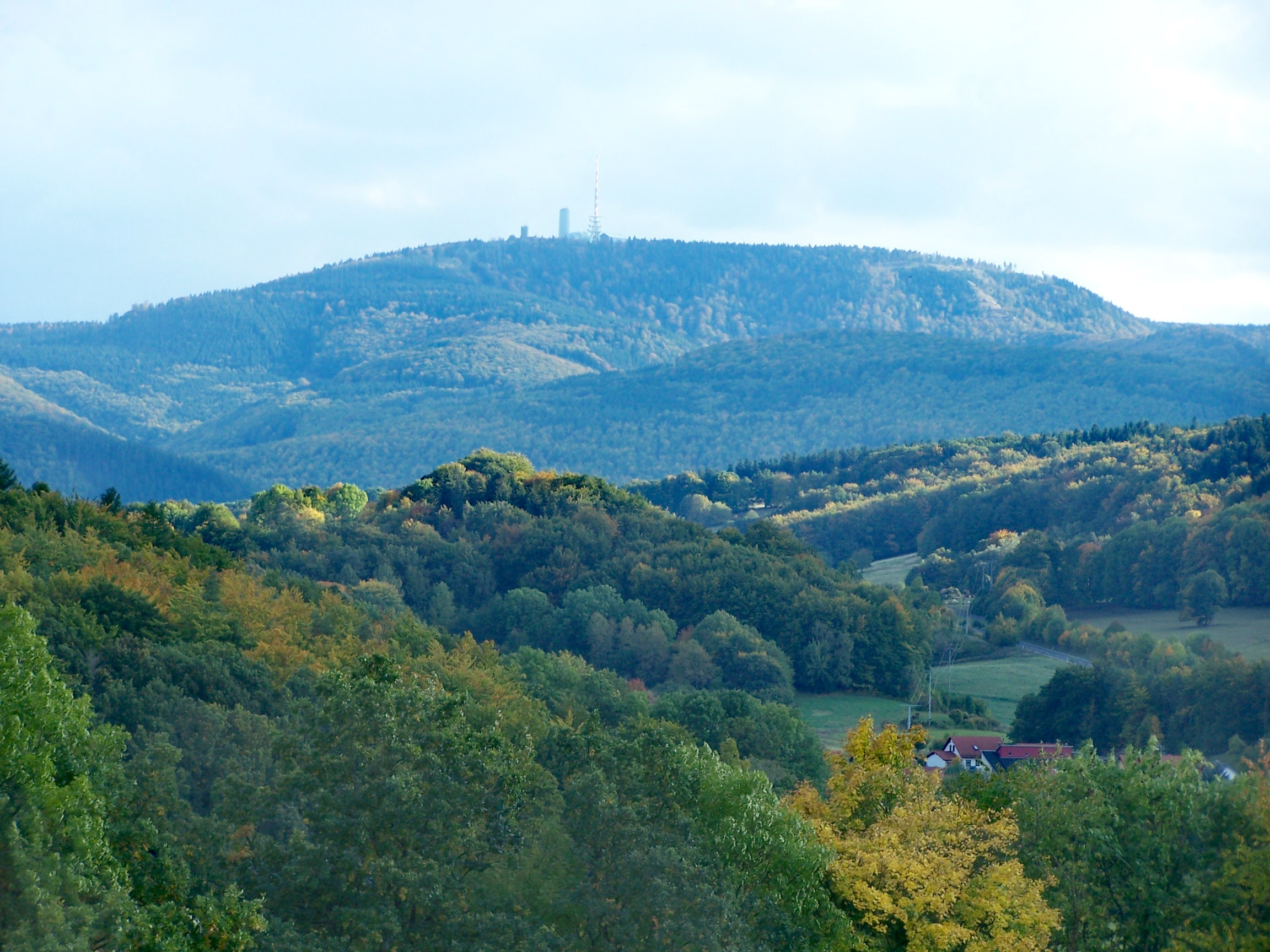
Großer Inselsberg

Due to many centuries of intensive settlement, most of the area is shaped by human influence. The original natural vegetation of Thuringia is forest with beech as its predominant species, as can still be found in the Hainich mountains today. In the uplands, a mixture of beech and spruce would be natural. However, most of the plains have been cleared and are in intensive agricultural use while most of the forests are planted with spruce and pine. Since 1990, Thuringia's forests have been managed aiming for a more natural and tough vegetation more resilient to climate change as well as diseases and vermin. In comparison to the forest, agriculture is still quite conventional and dominated by large structures and monocultures. Problems here are caused especially by increasingly prolonged dry periods during the summer months.

Environmental damage in Thuringia has been reduced to a large extent after 1990. The condition of forests, rivers and air was improved by modernizing factories, houses (decline of coal heating) and cars, and contaminated areas such as the former Uranium surface mines around Ronneburg have been remediated. Today's environmental problems are the salination of the Werra river, caused by discharges of K+S salt mines around Unterbreizbach and overfertilisation in agriculture, damaging the soil and small rivers.

Environment and nature protection has been of growing importance and attention since 1990. Large areas, especially within the forested mountains, are protected as natural reserves, including Thuringia's first national park within the Hainich mountains, founded in 1997, the Rhön Biosphere Reserve, the Thuringian Forest Nature Park and the South Harz Nature Park.

== Demographics ==
=== Demographic history ===
During the Middle Ages, Thuringia was at the border between Germanic and Slavic territories, marked by the Saale river. The main Slavic tribe in what is now Thuringia were the Sorbs proper, who unified all tribes in what is now southern half of Eastern Germany. The Ostsiedlung movement led to the assimilation of Slavic people between the 11th and the 13th century under German rule. The population growth increased during the 18th century and stayed high until World War I, before it slowed within the 20th century and changed to a decline since 1990. Since the beginning of Urbanisation around 1840, the Thuringian cities have higher growth rates resp. smaller rates of decline than rural areas (many villages lost half of their population since 1950, whereas the biggest cities (Erfurt and Jena) kept growing).

Historical population

Year	Pop.	±%
1834	1,172,375	—
1864	1,435,115	+22.4%
1890	1,737,544	+21.1%
1910	2,160,692	+24.4%
1950	2,932,242	+35.7%
1960	2,737,865	−6.6%

Year	Pop.	±%
1970	2,759,084	+0.8%
1980	2,730,368	−1.0%
1988	2,723,268	−0.3%
2001	2,411,387	−11.5%
2011	2,188,589	−9.2%
2022	2,110,396	−3.6%

Source: Thüringer Landesamt für Statistik

The 1981 census projected that Thuringia's population would reach 2,221,222 by 2011. The population counted in the 2011 census was 2,181,603, which is about 1.78% less.

Significant foreign resident populations
Nationality	Population (31 December 2022)	Population (31 December 2023)
Ukraine	32,150	34,180
Syria	16,435	22,055
Poland	14,255	14,780
Romania	13,475	14,195
Afghanistan	6,250	10,950
Russia	4,340	5,305
Turkey	4,130	5,260
Bulgaria	5,320	5,240
Iraq	-	4,715
Vietnam	7,385	4,040

=== Current population ===
The current population is 2,120,237 (31 December 2020) with an annual rate of decrease of about 0.5%, which varies widely between the local regions. In 2012, 905,000 Thuringians lived in a municipality with more than 20,000 inhabitants, this is an urbanization rate of 42% which continues to rise.

In July 2013, there were 41,000 non-Germans by citizenship living in Thuringia (1.9% of the population − among the smallest proportions of any state in Germany). Nevertheless, the number rose from 33,000 in July 2011, an increase of 24% in only two years. About 4% of the population are migrants (including persons that already received German citizenship). The biggest groups of foreigners by citizenship are (as of 2012): Russians (3,100), Poles (3,000), Turks (2,100) and Ukrainians (2,000). The number of foreigners varies between regions: the college towns Erfurt, Jena, Weimar and Ilmenau have the highest rates, whereas there are almost no migrants living in the most rural smaller municipalities.

The Thuringian population has a significant sex ratio gap, caused by the emigration of young women, especially in rural areas. Overall, there are 115 to 120 men per 100 women in the 25–40 age group ("family founders") which has negative consequences for the birth ratio. Furthermore, the population is getting older and older with some rural municipalities recording more than 30% of over-65s (pensioners). This is a problem for the regional labour market, as there are twice as many people leaving as entering the job market annually.

=== Natural and spatial tendencies ===
The birth rate was about 1.8 children per women in the 1970s and 1980s, shrinking to 0.8 in 1994 during the economic crisis after the reunification and rose again to more than 1.4 children in 2010, which is a higher level than in West Germany. Nevertheless, there are only 17,000 births compared to 27,000 deaths per year, so that the annual natural change of the Thuringian population is about −0.45%. In 2015 there were 17,934 births, the highest number since 1990.

Migration plays an important role in Thuringia. The internal migration shows a strong tendency from rural areas towards the big cities. From 2008 to 2012, there was a net migration from Thuringia to Erfurt of +6,700 persons (33 per 1000 inhabitants), +1,800 to Gera (19 per 1000), +1,400 to Jena (14 per 1000), +1,400 to Eisenach (33 per 1000) and +1,300 to Weimar (21 per 1000). Between Thuringia and the other German states, the balance is negative: In 2012, Thuringia lost 6,500 persons to other federal states, the most to Bavaria, Saxony, Hesse and Berlin. Only with Saxony-Anhalt and Brandenburg the balance is positive. The international migration is fluctuating heavily. In 2009, the balance was +700, in 2010 +1,800, in 2011 +2,700 and in 2012 +4,800. The most important countries of origin of the Thuringia migrants from 2008 to 2012 were Poland (+1,700), Romania (+1,200), Afghanistan (+1,100) and Serbia/Montenegro/Kosovo (+1,000), whereas the balance was negative with Switzerland (−2,800) and Austria (−900).

=== Cities, towns and villages ===
Of the approximately 850 municipalities of Thuringia, 126 are classed as towns (within a district) or cities (forming their own urban district). Most of the towns are small with a population of less than 10,000; only the ten biggest ones have a population greater than 30,000. The first towns emerged during the 12th century, whereas the latest ones received town status only in the 20th century. Today, all municipalities within districts are equal in law, whether they are towns or villages. Independent cities (i.e. urban districts) have greater powers (the same as any district) than towns within a district.

Rank	City	District	Pop. 31 December 2020	Change*	CoA	Image
1	Erfurt	independent	213,692	+0.68		Erfurt: St. Severus' Church and Cathedral
2	Jena	independent	110,731	+0.47		Jena: City centre and Carl Zeiss' high-rises
3	Gera	independent	92,126	−0.55		Gera: Untermhaus district, St. Mary's Church and White Elster river
4	Weimar	independent	65,098	+0.35		Weimar: City centre
5	Gotha	Gotha	45,273	−0.05		Gotha: Friedenstein Castle
6	Nordhausen	Nordhausen	40,969	−0.35		Nordhausen: City centre
7	Eisenach	Wartburgkreis	41,970	−0.12		Eisenach: Wartburg castle
8	Suhl	independent	36,395	−1.68		Suhl: City centre
9	Mühlhausen	Unstrut-Hainich-Kreis	35,799	−0.38		Mühlhausen: City wall at Frauentor gate
10	Altenburg	Altenburger Land	31,101	−1.27		Altenburg: City centre with the Red Spires

* Average annual change in percent within the last three years (13 December 2009 to 31 December 2012), adjusted from incorporations and the 2011 Census results.

=== Religion ===
Religion in Thuringia - 2025
Religion	Percent
None or other	76.0%
EKD Protestants	17.1%
Roman Catholics	6.9%

Since the Protestant Reformation, the most prominent Christian denomination in Thuringia has been Lutheranism. During the GDR period, church membership was discouraged and has continued shrinking since the reunification in 1990. Today over two thirds of the population is non-religious. The Protestant Church in Germany has had the largest number of members in the state, adhered to by 17.1% of the population in 2025. Members of the Catholic Church formed 6.9% of the population, while 76.0% of Thuringians were non-religious or adhere to other faiths. The highest Protestant concentrations are in the small villages of southern and western Thuringia, whereas the bigger cities are even more non-religious (up to 88% in Gera). Catholic regions are Eichsfeld in the northwest and parts of the Rhön Mountains around Geisa in the southwest. Protestant church membership is shrinking rapidly, whereas the Catholic Church is somewhat more stable because of Catholic migration from Poland, Southern Europe and West Germany. Other religions play no significant role in Thuringia. There are only a few thousand Muslims (largely migrants) and about 750 Jews (mostly migrants from Russia) living in Thuringia. Furthermore, there are some Orthodox communities of Eastern European migrants and some traditional Protestant Free churches in Thuringia without any societal influence.

The Protestant parishes of Thuringia belong to the Evangelical Church in Central Germany or to the Evangelical Church of Hesse Electorate-Waldeck (Schmalkalden region). Catholic dioceses are Erfurt (most of Thuringia), Dresden-Meissen (eastern parts) and Fulda (Rhön around Geisa in the very west).

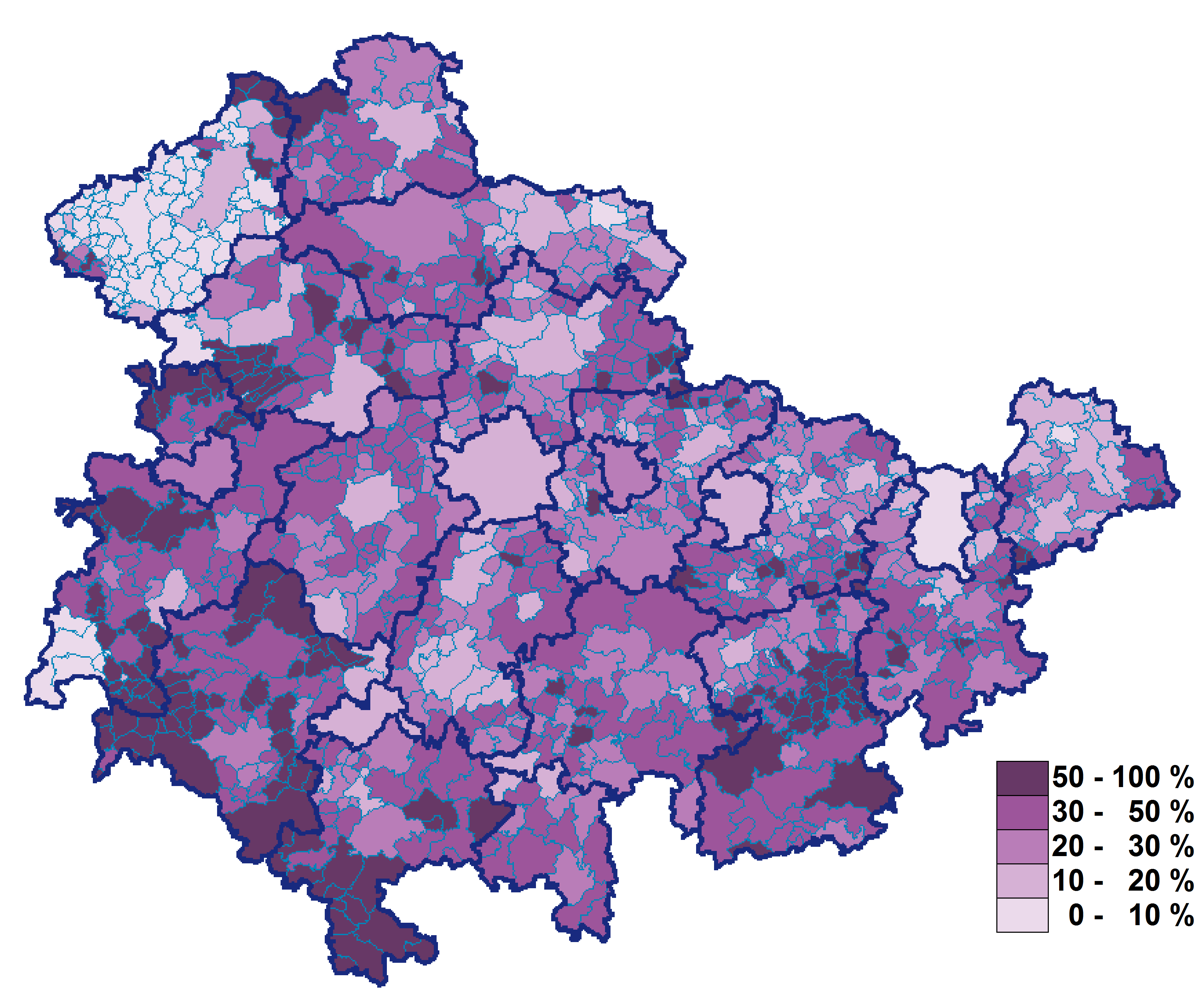
EKD Protestant membership in 2011 (municipalities)

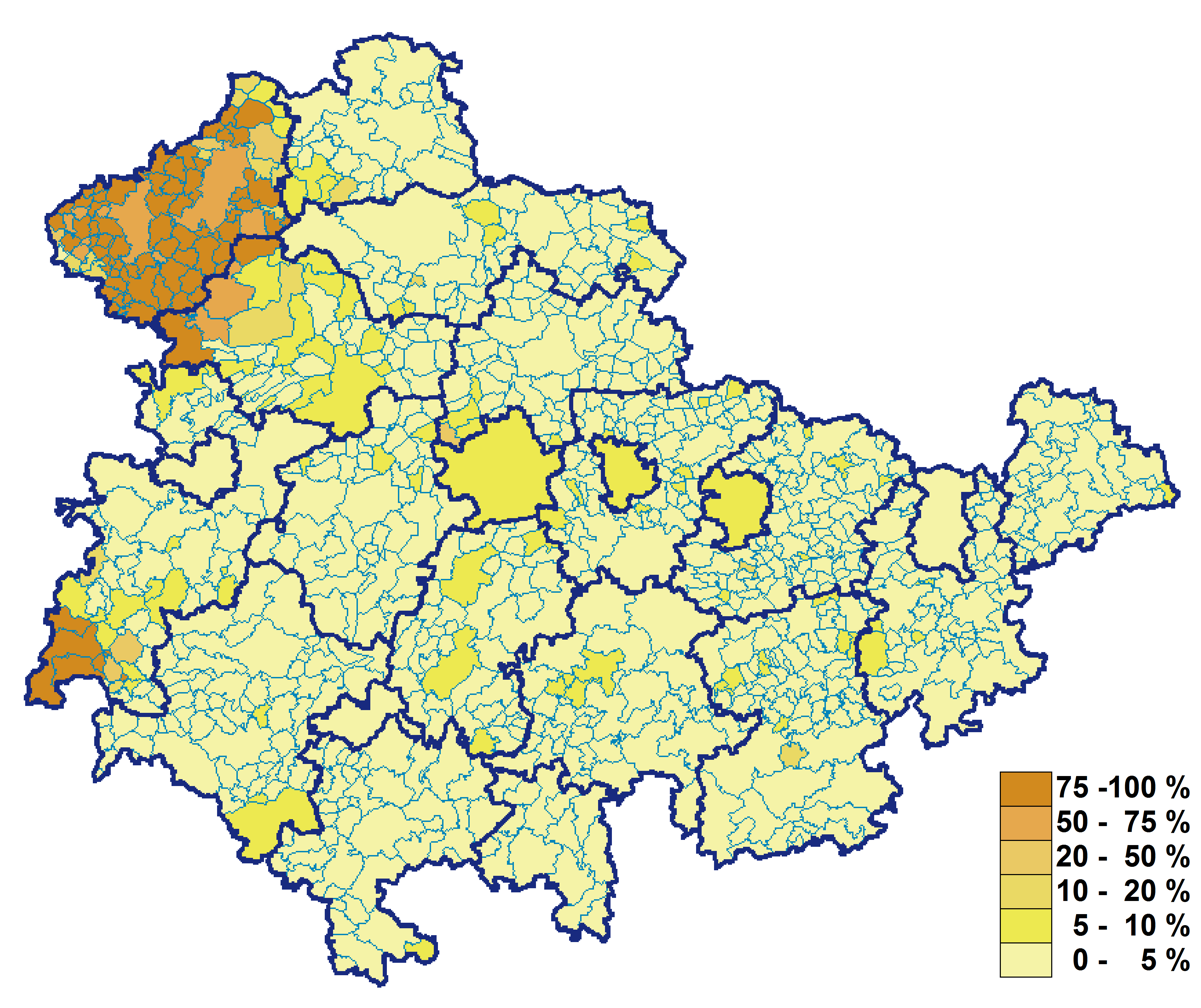
Catholic membership in 2011 (municipalities)

== Politics ==
=== National ===
Thuringia is a stronghold for the far-right Alternative for Germany (AfD), the party emerged as the largest in Thuringia in the 2021 national elections. In 2017 the party got 22.7%, in 2021 they got 24.0%, and in 2025 they surged to 38.6%.

=== State ===
Thuringia is notable for being the first state in Germany where the modern successor to the Socialist Unity Party (SED), the party that ruled former East Germany until 1989, The Left (Die Linke), and the new far-right Alternative for Germany (AfD) have achieved first place finishes in a state election. Die Linke in 2019, and the AfD in 2024.

==== September 2024 state election ====
The Alternative for Germany (AfD) became the largest party with 33% of the vote (and 36% of the seats), its best ever performance and the first time it placed first in a state election in Germany. The incumbent governing coalition suffered dramatic losses; the Left had split up, with new Sahra Wagenknecht Alliance (BSW) becoming the more popular part, while the remaining Left lost more than half of its support and fell to fourth place on 13%. The 130+ year old SPD, which until 2025 ruled Germany under Chancellor Olaf Scholz, recorded its worst result in any postwar state election, barely passing the electoral threshold of 5%. The other two parties of the traffic light coalition in Berlin, Greens and the Free Democratic Party (FDP), did not pass the threshold and lost all of their seats, which contributed to the break-up of that coalition on November 6th. The Christian Democratic Union (CDU) recorded small gains and came second with 24%. The newly-founded Sahra Wagenknecht Alliance BSW debuted in third place at 16%.

The AfD in Thuringia became the first far-right party in Germany since World War II to win a state election. However, they were left out of the governing coalition, which is made up of the CDU, the BSW and the SPD, with the Left offering "constructive opposition" (basically they offer some input on the coalition's agenda and provide necessary votes).

Party	Party-list			Constituency			Total seats	+/–
Party	Votes	%	Seats	Votes	%	Seats	Total seats	+/–
Alternative for Germany (AfD)	396,704	32.84	3	408,011	34.33	29	32	+10
Christian Democratic Union (CDU)	285,141	23.61	12	397,927	33.48	11	23	+2
Bündnis Sahra Wagenknecht (BSW)	190,448	15.77	15	28,478	2.40	0	15	+15
The Left (Die Linke)	157,641	13.05	8	180,207	15.16	4	12	–17
Social Democratic Party (SPD)	73,088	6.05	6	92,510	7.78	0	6	–2
Alliance 90/The Greens (Grüne)	38,289	3.17	0	19,092	1.61	0	0	–5
Free Voters (FW)	15,371	1.27	0	33,405	2.81	0	0	–
Free Democratic Party (FDP)	13,582	1.12	0	18,706	1.57	0	0	–5
Action Party for Animal Welfare (APfT)	12,113	1.00	0				0	–
Values Union (WU)	6,780	0.56	0	4,192	0.35	0	0	–
Family Party (Familie)	5,722	0.47	0				0	–
Bündnis Deutschland (BD)	5,508	0.46	0				0	–
Pirate Party Germany (Piraten)	3,718	0.31	0	449	0.04	0	0	–
Ecological Democratic Party (ÖDP)	2,389	0.20	0	2,196	0.18	0	0	–
Marxist–Leninist Party of Germany (MLPD)	1,342	0.11	0	617	0.05	0	0	–
Other			0	2,696	0.23	0	0	–
Total	1,207,836	100.00	44	1,188,486	100.00	44	88	–2
Valid votes	1,207,836	99.15		1,188,486	97.56			
Invalid/blank votes	10,354	0.85		29,704	2.44			
Total votes	1,218,190	100.00		1,218,190	100.00			
Registered voters/turnout	1,655,343	73.59		1,655,343	73.59			
Source: Results

=== Local government ===
Thuringia is divided into 17 districts (Landkreise):

- Altenburger Land
- Eichsfeld
- Gotha
- Greiz
- Hildburghausen
- Ilm-Kreis
- Kyffhäuserkreis
- Nordhausen
- Saale-Holzland-Kreis
- Saale-Orla-Kreis
- Saalfeld-Rudolstadt
- Schmalkalden-Meiningen
- Sömmerda
- Sonneberg
- Unstrut-Hainich-Kreis
- Wartburgkreis
- Weimarer Land

Districts of Thuringia

Furthermore, there are five urban districts:

- Erfurt (EF)
- Gera (G)
- Jena (J)
- Suhl (SHL)
- Weimar (WE)

== Economy ==
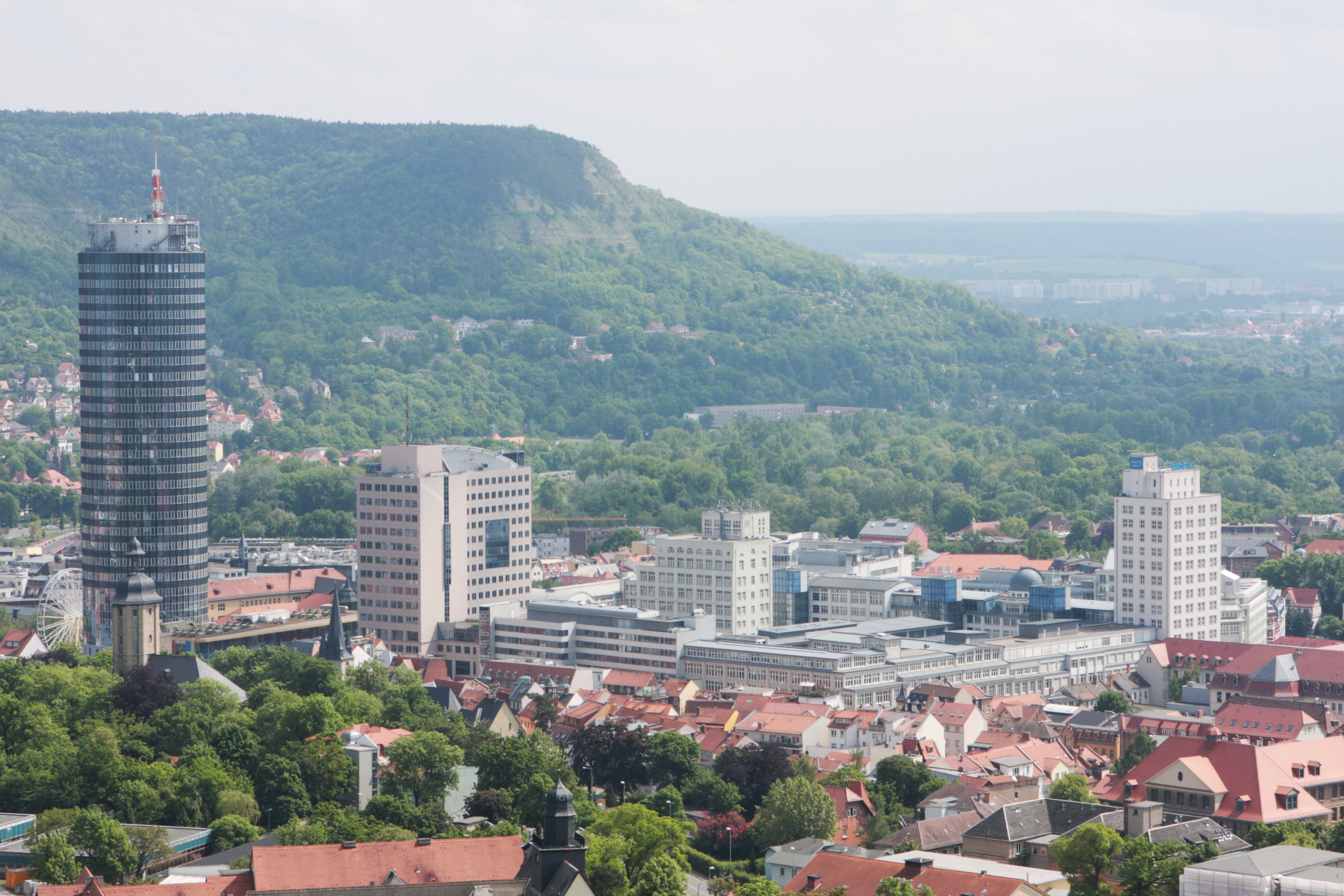
The Jen Tower is a symbol of eastern Germany's economy. According to the 2019 study by Forschungsinstitut Prognos, Jena is one of the most dynamic regions in Germany. It ranks at number 29 of all 401 German regions.

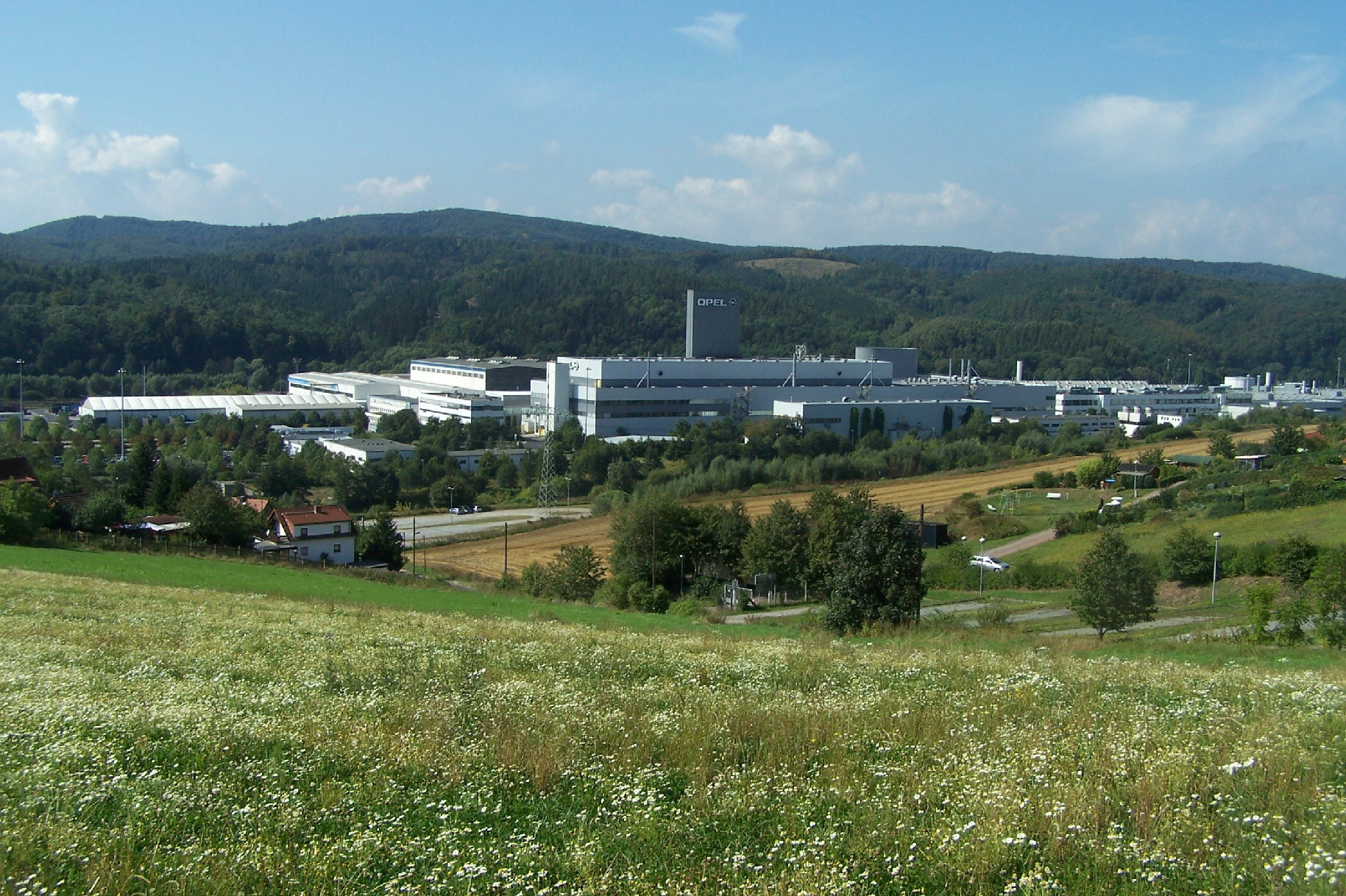
Opel Eisenach manufacturing

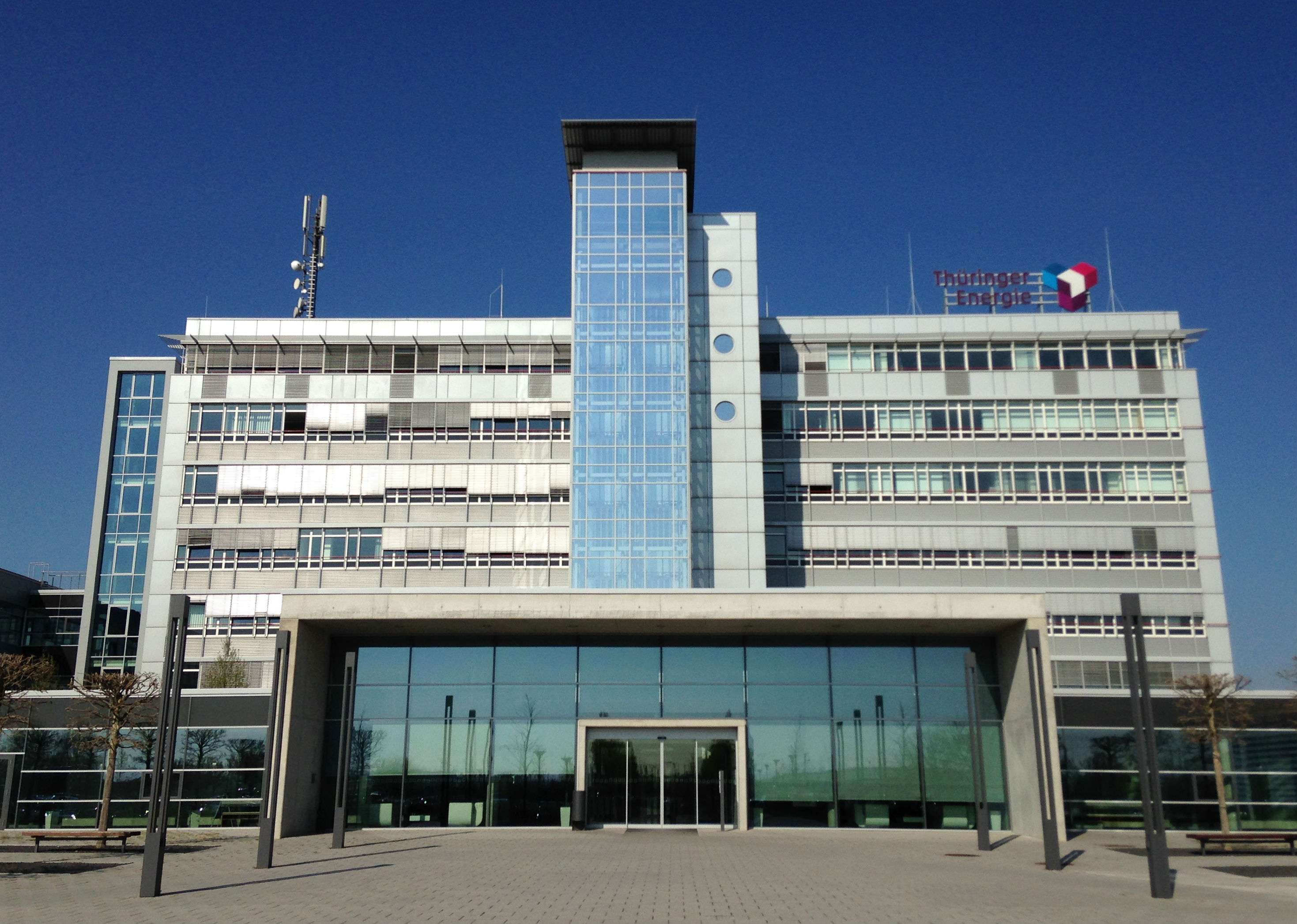
TEAG Thüringer Energie AG in Erfurt, the largest electric utility company in Thuringia

Thuringia's economy is marked by the economic transition that happened after the German reunification and led to the closure of most of the factories within the Land. The unemployment rate reached a peak in 2005. Since that year, the economy has seen an upturn and the general economic situation has improved.

=== Agriculture and forestry ===
Agriculture and forestry have declined in importance over the decades. Nevertheless, they are more important than in most other areas of Germany, especially within rural regions. 54% of Thuringia's territory is in agricultural use. The fertile basins such as the large Thuringian Basin or the smaller Goldene Aue, Orlasenke and Osterland are in intensive use for growing cereals, vegetables, fruits and energy crops. Important products are apples, strawberries, cherries and plums in the fruit sector, cabbage, potatoes, cauliflower, tomatoes (grown in greenhouses), onions, cucumbers and asparagus in the vegetable sector, as well as maize, rapeseed, wheat, barley and sugar beets in the crop sector.

Meat production and processing is also an important activity, with pigs, cattle, chickens and turkeys in focus. Furthermore, there are many milk and cheese producers, as well as laying hens. Trout and carp are traditionally bred in aquaculture in many villages.

Most agricultural enterprises are large cooperatives, founded as Landwirtschaftliche Produktionsgenossenschaft during the GDR period, and meat producers are part of multinational companies. Traditional private peasant agriculture is an exception, as is organic farming.

Thuringia's only wine-growing district is around Bad Sulza north of Weimar and Jena along the Ilm and Saale valley. Its production is marketed as Saale-Unstrut wines.

Forestry plays an important role in Thuringia because 32% of the Thuringian territory is forested. The most common trees are spruce, pine and beech. There are many wood and pulp-paper factories near the forested areas.

=== Industry and mining ===
Like most other regions of central and southern Germany, Thuringia has a significant industrial sector reaching back to the mid-19th-century industrialisation. The economic transition after the German reunification in 1990 led to the closure of most large-scale factories and companies, leaving small and medium-sized ones to dominate the manufacturing sector. Well-known industrial centres are Jena (a world centre for optical instruments with companies like Carl Zeiss, Schott and Jenoptik) and Eisenach, where BMW started its car production in the 1920s and an Opel factory is based today. The most important industrial branches today are engineering and metalworking, vehicle production and food industries. Especially the small and mid-sized towns in central and southwestern Thuringia (e.g. Arnstadt, Schmalkalden and Ohrdruf) are highly industrialised, whereas there are fewer industrial companies in the northern and eastern parts of the Land. Traditional industries like production of glass, porcelain and toys collapsed during the economic crises between 1930 and 1990.

Mining was important in Thuringia since the later Middle Ages, especially within the mining towns of the Thuringian Forest such as Schmalkalden, Suhl and Ilmenau. Following the industrial revolution, the old iron, copper and silver mines declined because the competition from imported metal was too strong. On the other hand, the late 19th century brought new types of mines to Thuringia: the lignite surface mining around Meuselwitz near Altenburg in the east of the Land started in the 1870s, and two potash mining districts were established around 1900. These are the Südharzrevier in the north of the state, between Bischofferode in the west and Roßleben in the east with Sondershausen at its centre, and the Werrarevier on the Hessian border around Vacha and Bad Salzungen in the west. Together, they accounted for a significant part of the world's potash production in the mid-20th century. After the reunification, the Südharzrevier was abandoned, whereas K+S took over the mines in the Werrarevier. Between 1950 and 1990, uranium mining was also important to cover the Soviet Union's need for this metal. The centre was Ronneburg near Gera in eastern Thuringia and the operating company Wismut was under direct Soviet control.

=== General economic parameters ===
The GDP of Thuringia is below the national average, in line with the other former East German Lands. Until 2004, Thuringia was one of the weakest regions within the European Union. The accession of several new countries, the crisis in southern Europe and the sustained economic growth in Germany since 2005 has brought the Thuringian GDP close to the EU average since then. The high economic subsidies granted by the federal government and the EU after 1990 are being reduced gradually and will end around 2020.

The unemployment rate reached its peak of 17.1% in 2005. Since then, it has decreased to 5.3% in 2019, which is only slightly above the national average. The decrease is caused on the one hand by the emergence of new jobs and on the other by a marked decrease in the working-age population, caused by emigration and low birth rates for decades. The wages in Thuringia are low compared to rich bordering Lands like Hesse and Bavaria. Therefore, many Thuringians are working in other German Lands and even in Austria and Switzerland as weekly commuters. Nevertheless, the demographic transition in Thuringia leads to a lack of workers in some sectors. External immigration into Thuringia has been encouraged by the government since about 2010 to counter this problem.

The economic progress is quite different between the regions of Thuringia. The big cities along the A4 motorway such as Erfurt, Jena and Eisenach and their surroundings are booming, whereas nearly all the rural regions, especially in the north and east, have little economic impetus and employment, which is a big issue in regional planning. Young people in these areas often have to commute long distances, and many emigrate soon after finishing school.

The unemployment rate stood at 5.9% in 2023 and was higher than the German average.

Unemployment rate by year

- 2000: 15.4%
- 2001: 15.3%
- 2002: 15.9%
- 2003: 16.7%
- 2004: 16.7%
- 2005: 17.1%
- 2006: 15.6%
- 2007: 13.1%
- 2008: 11.2%
- 2009: 11.4%
- 2010: 9.8%
- 2011: 8.8%
- 2012: 8.5%
- 2013: 8.2%
- 2014: 7.8%
- 2015: 7.4%
- 2016: 6.7%
- 2017: 6.1%
- 2018: 5.5%
- 2019: 5.3%
- 2020: 6%
- 2021: 5.6%
- 2022: 5.3%
- 2023: 5.9%

=== Tourism ===
Tourism is an important branch of the economy. Thuringia has a number of well known destinations: Wartburg castle (UNESCO World Heritage Site), Classical Weimar (UNESCO World Heritage Site), Bauhaus Weimar (UNESCO World Heritage Site), Thuringian Forest, Oberhof or Rennsteig (ridge walk). City tourism with the centers of Erfurt, Weimar, Jena, Eisenach and Mühlhausen is experiencing dynamic growth. A total of around 9.2 million overnight stays were booked in 2016, compared to 8.3 million ten years earlier. Around 6% of the bookings were made by foreign guests.

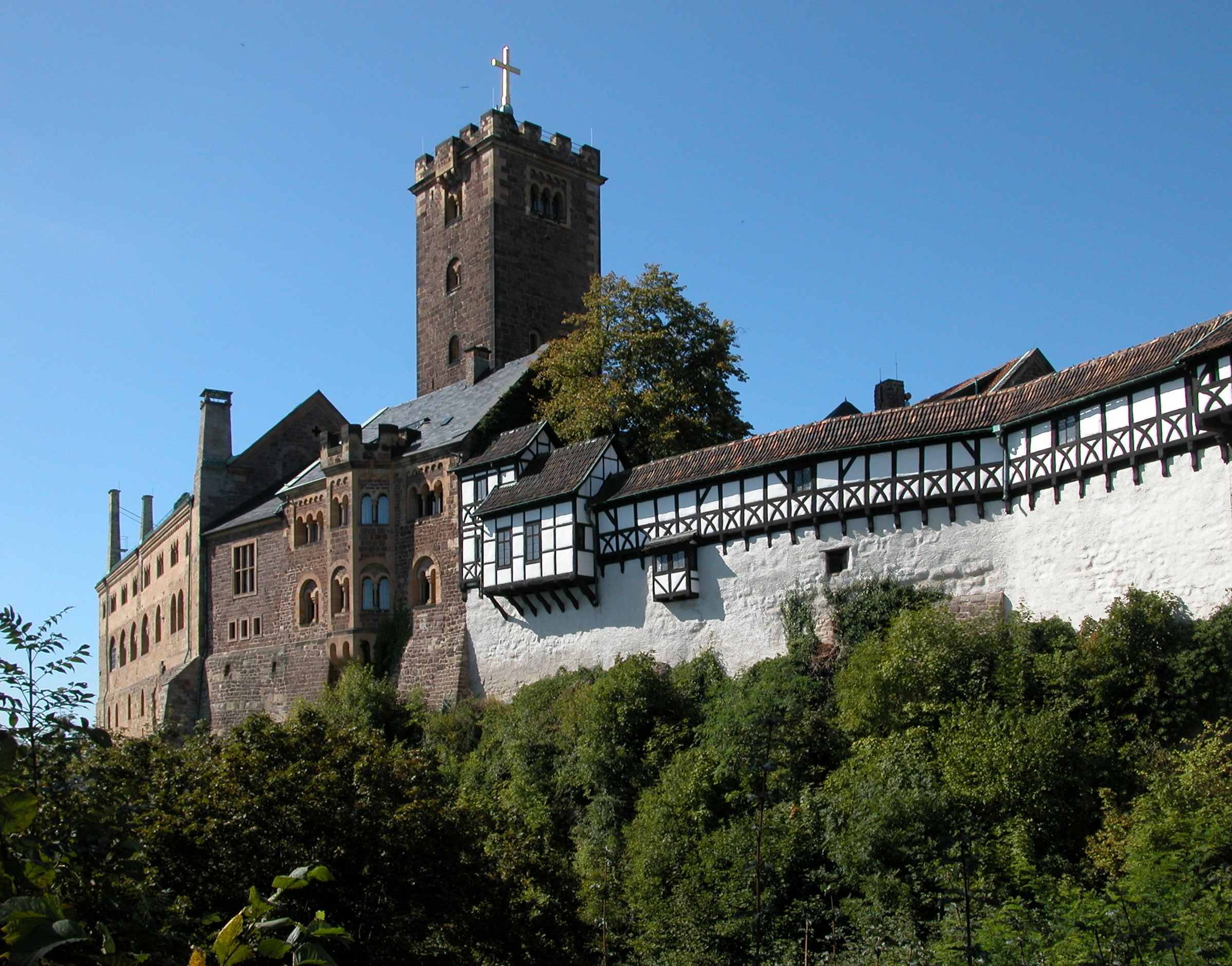
Wartburg

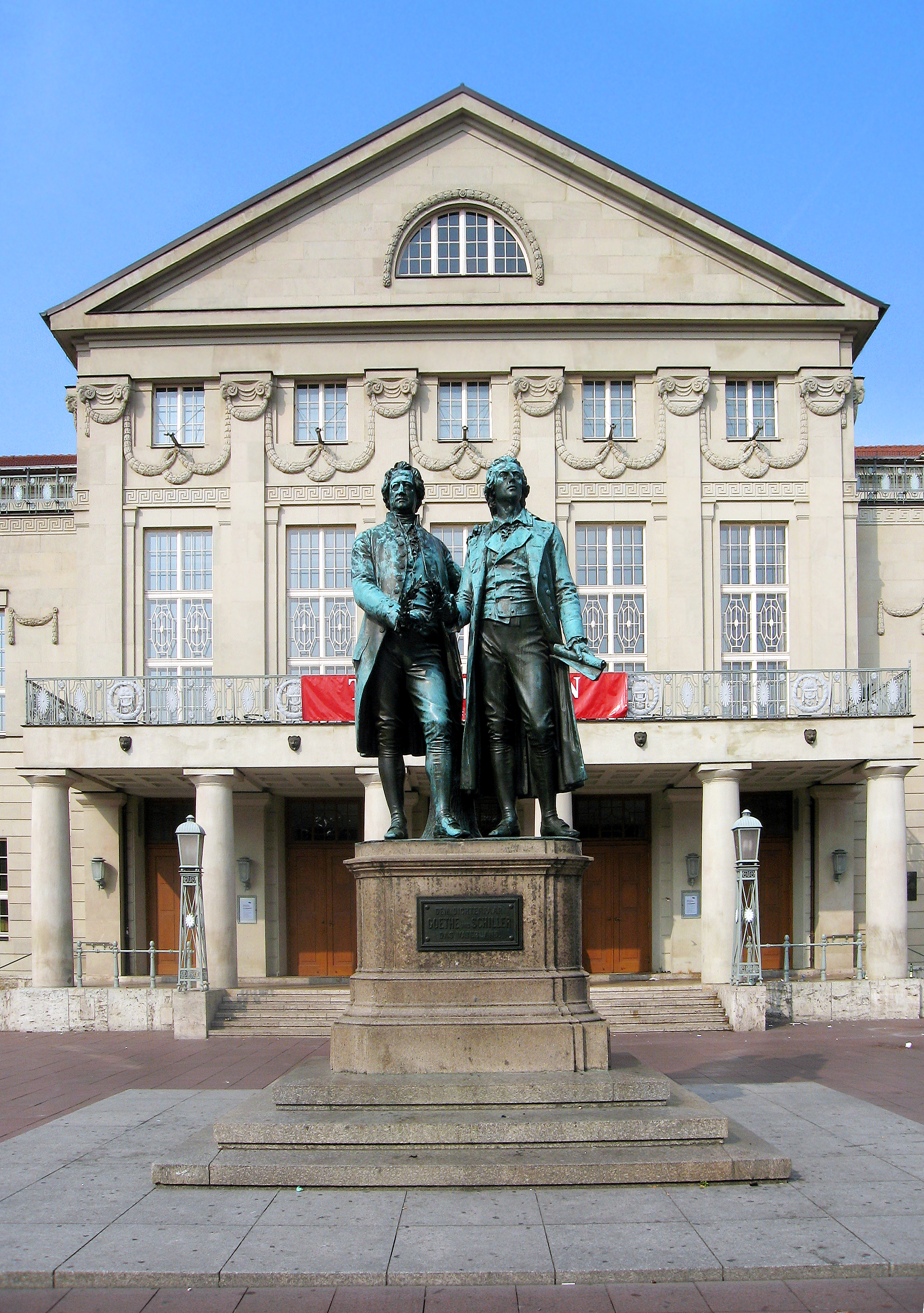
Goethe–Schiller Monument in Weimar

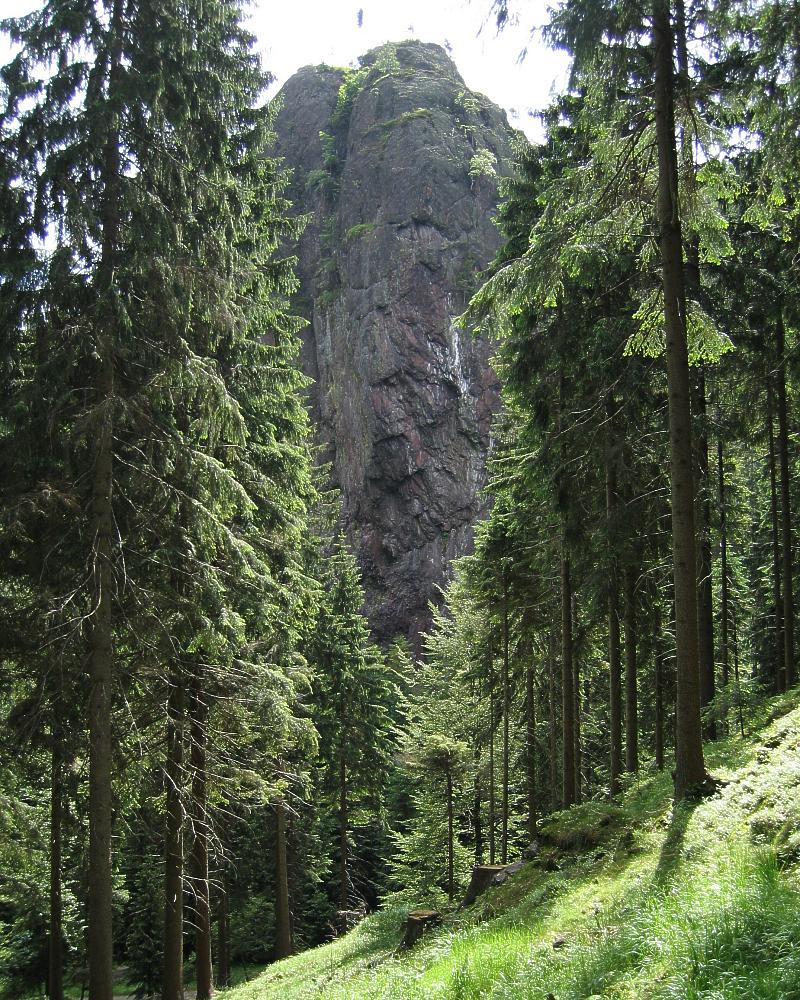
Thuringian Forest

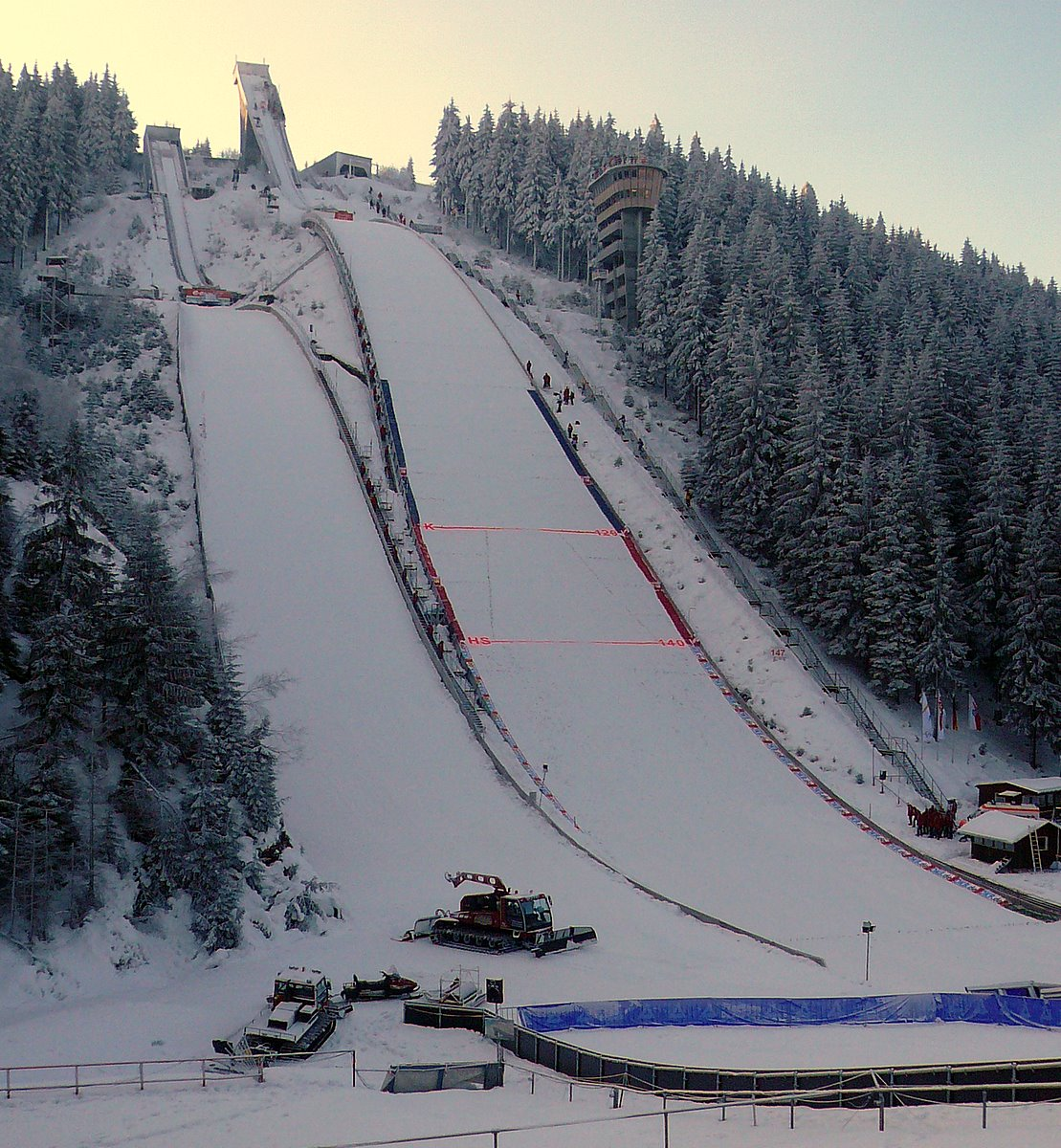
Oberhof

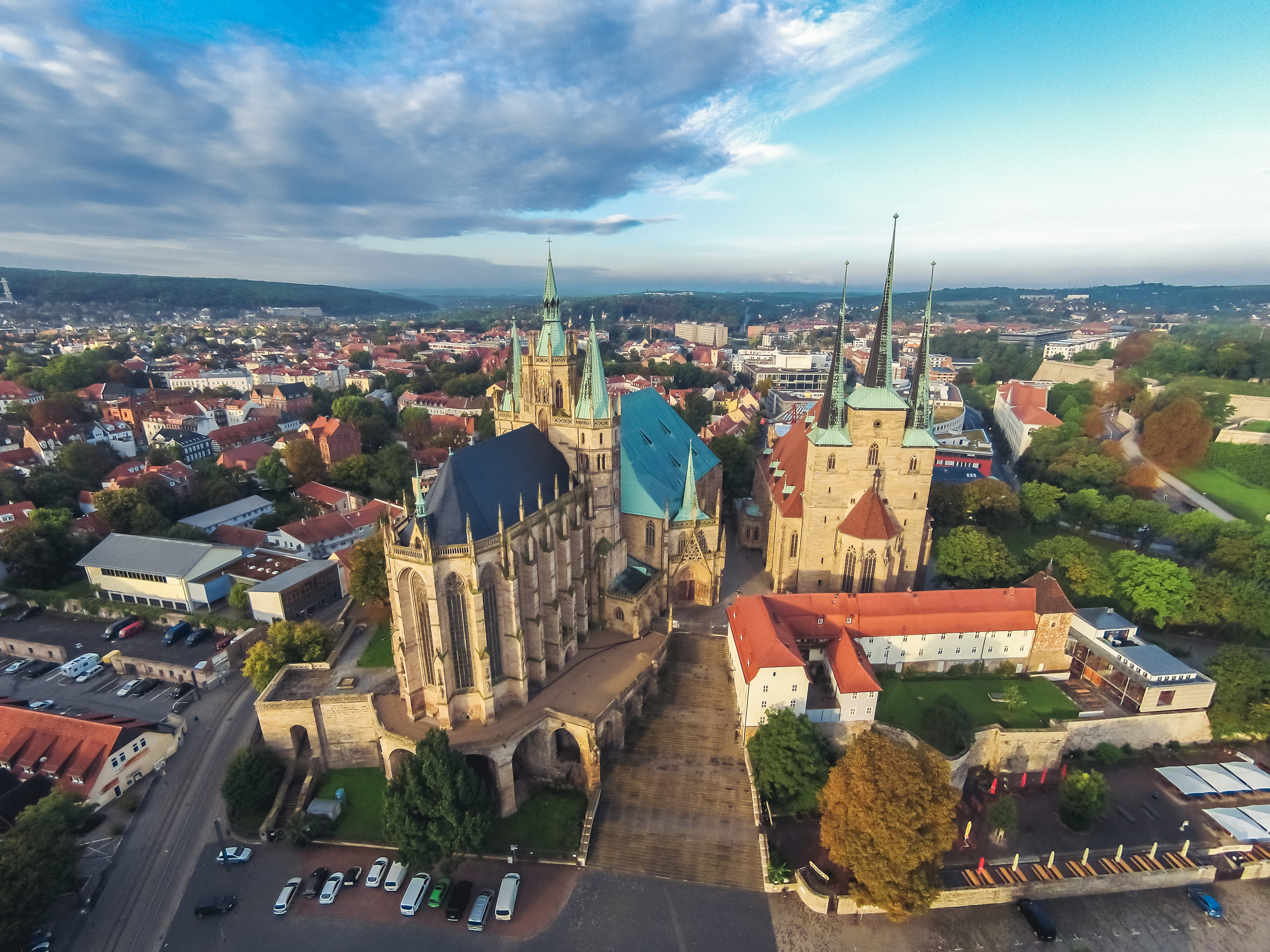
Erfurt skyline

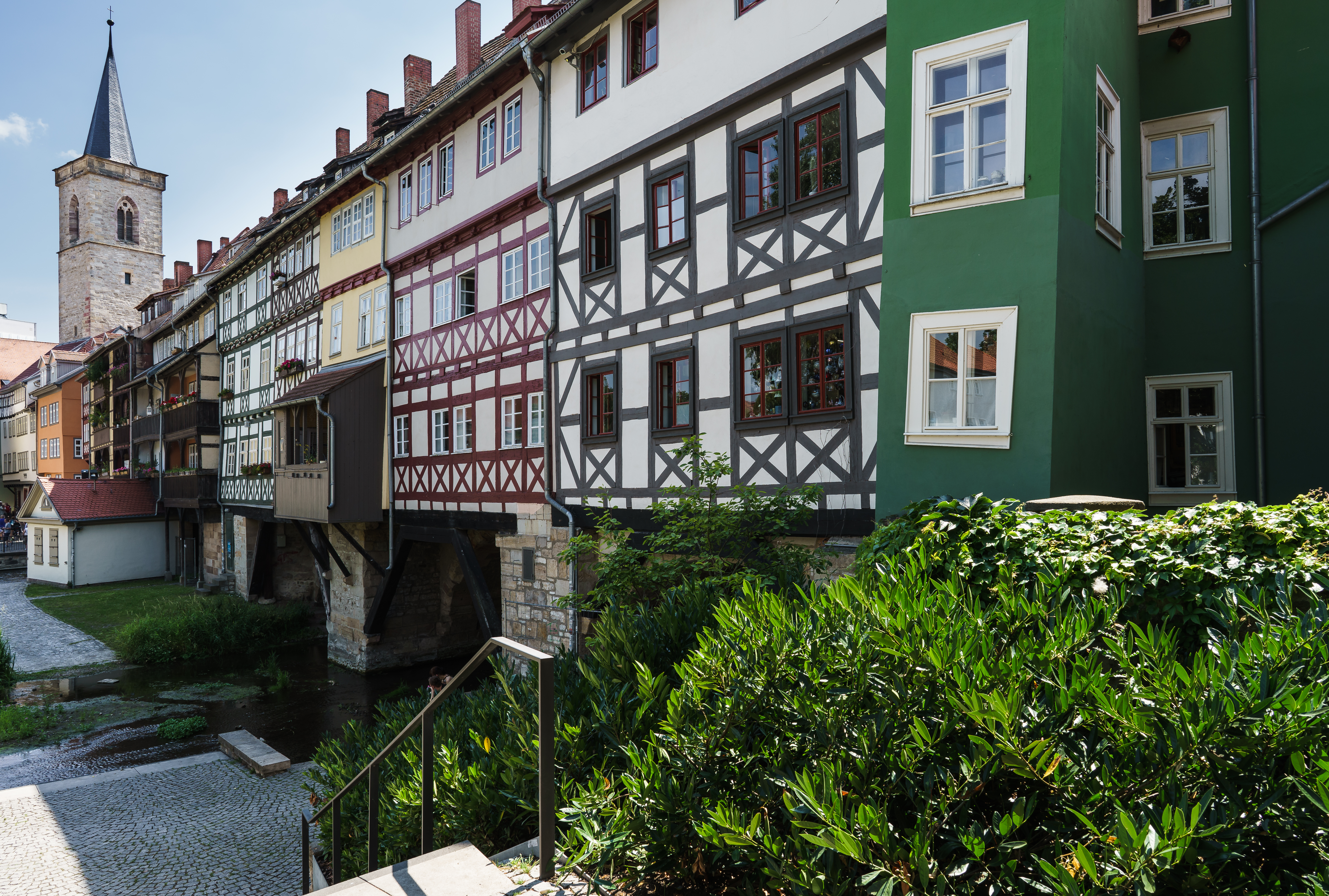
Krämerbrücke in Erfurt

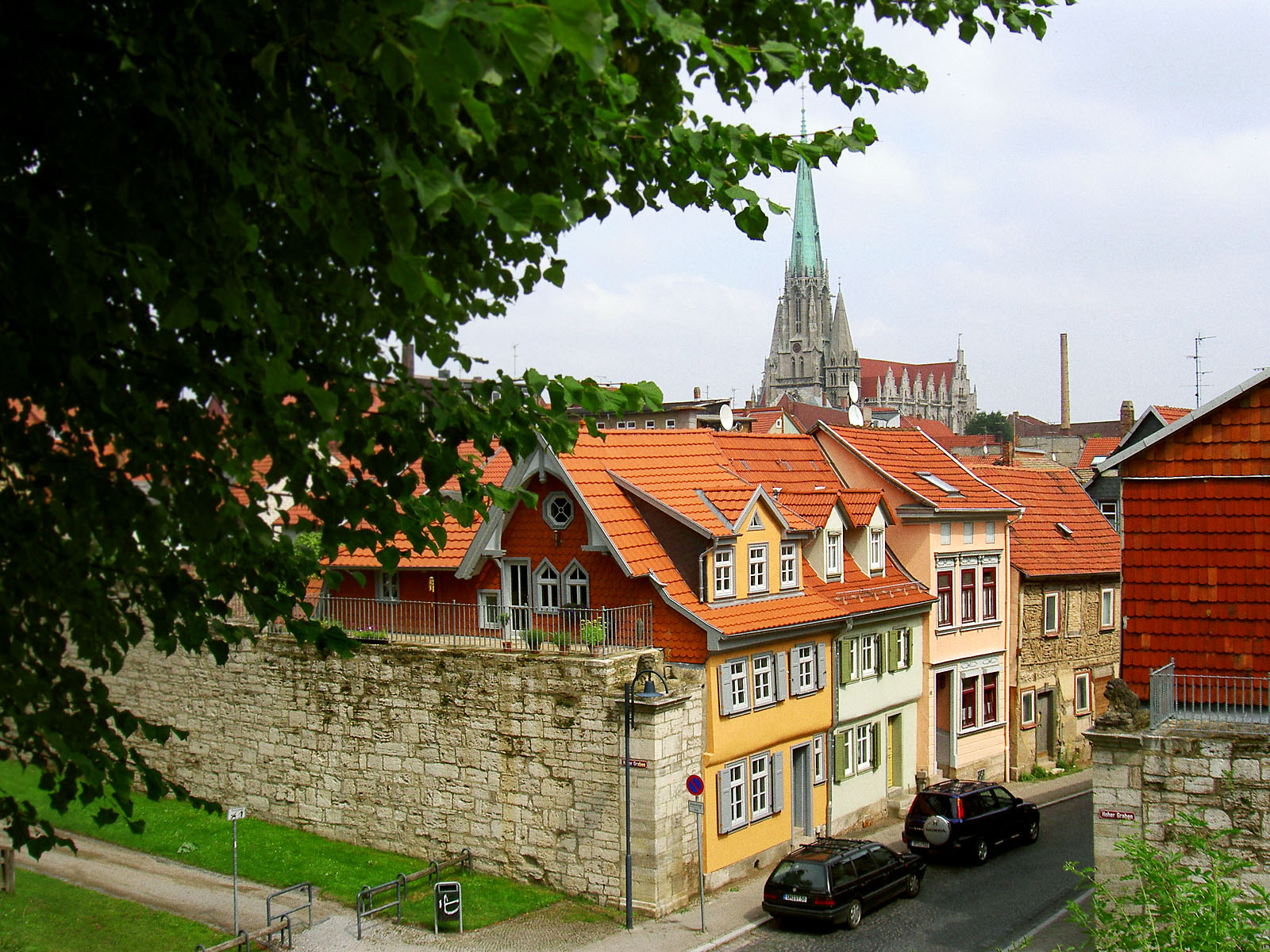
Oldtown of Mühlhausen

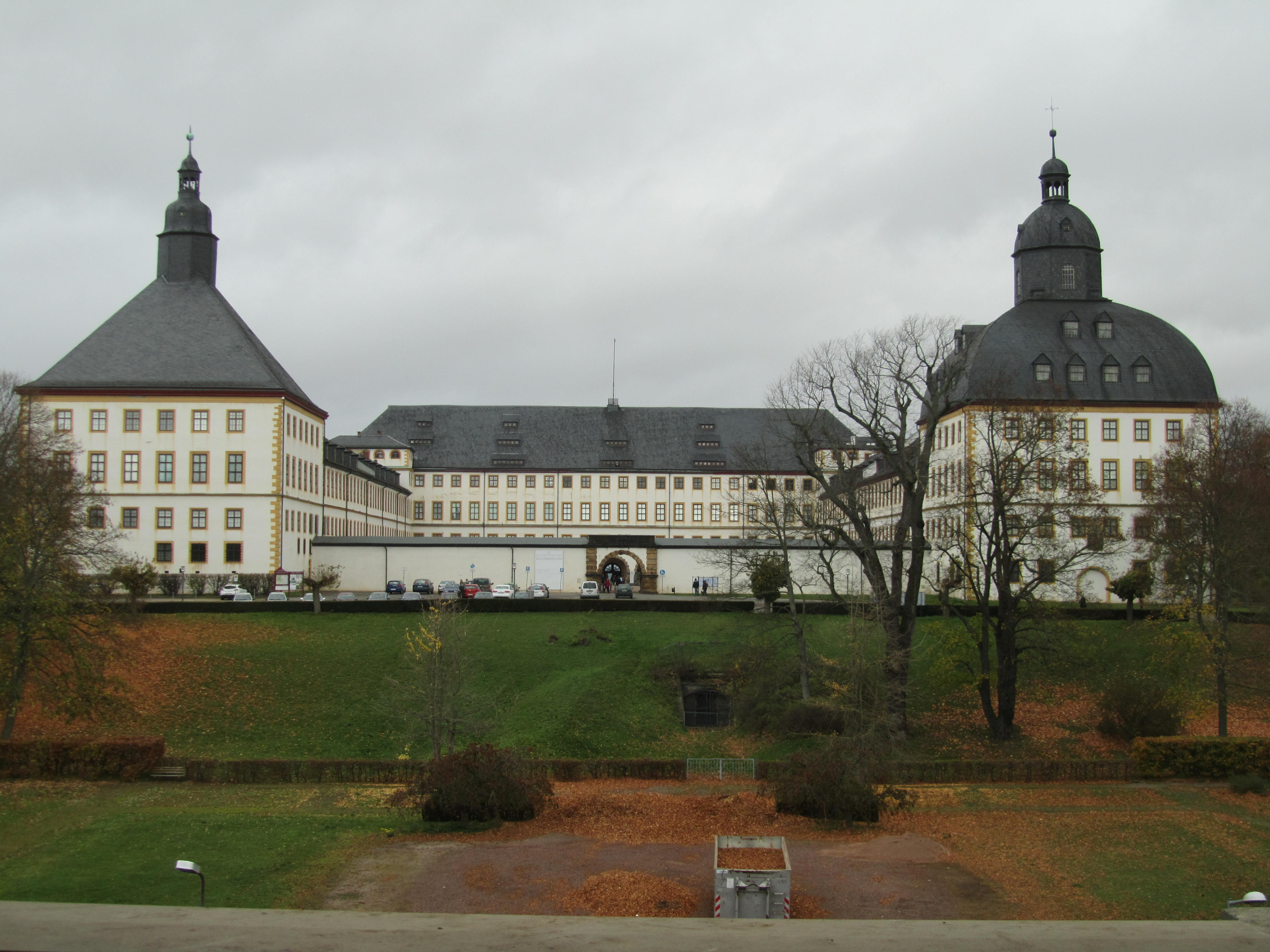
Friedenstein Palace, Gotha

== Infrastructure ==
=== Transport ===
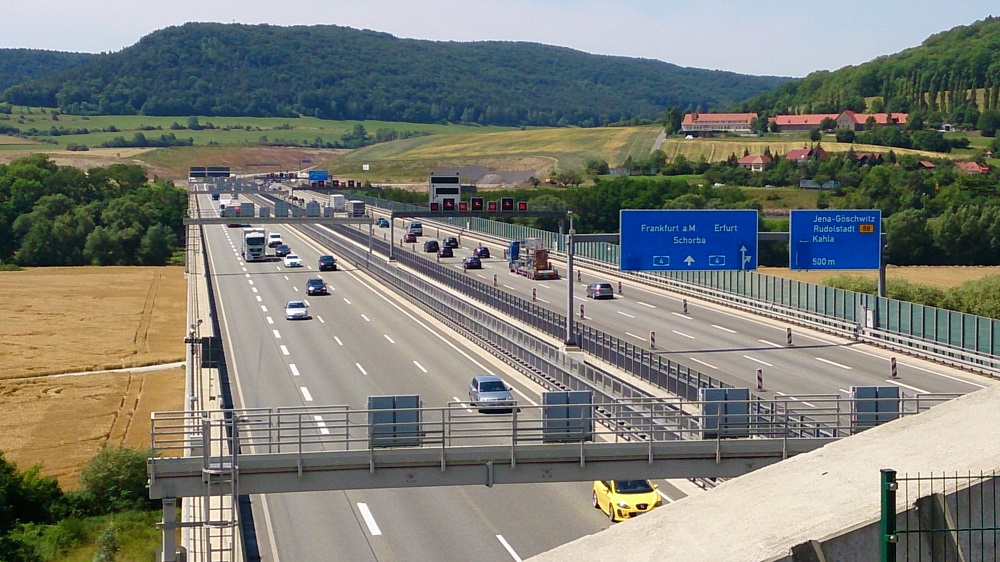
Bundesautobahn 4 near Jena

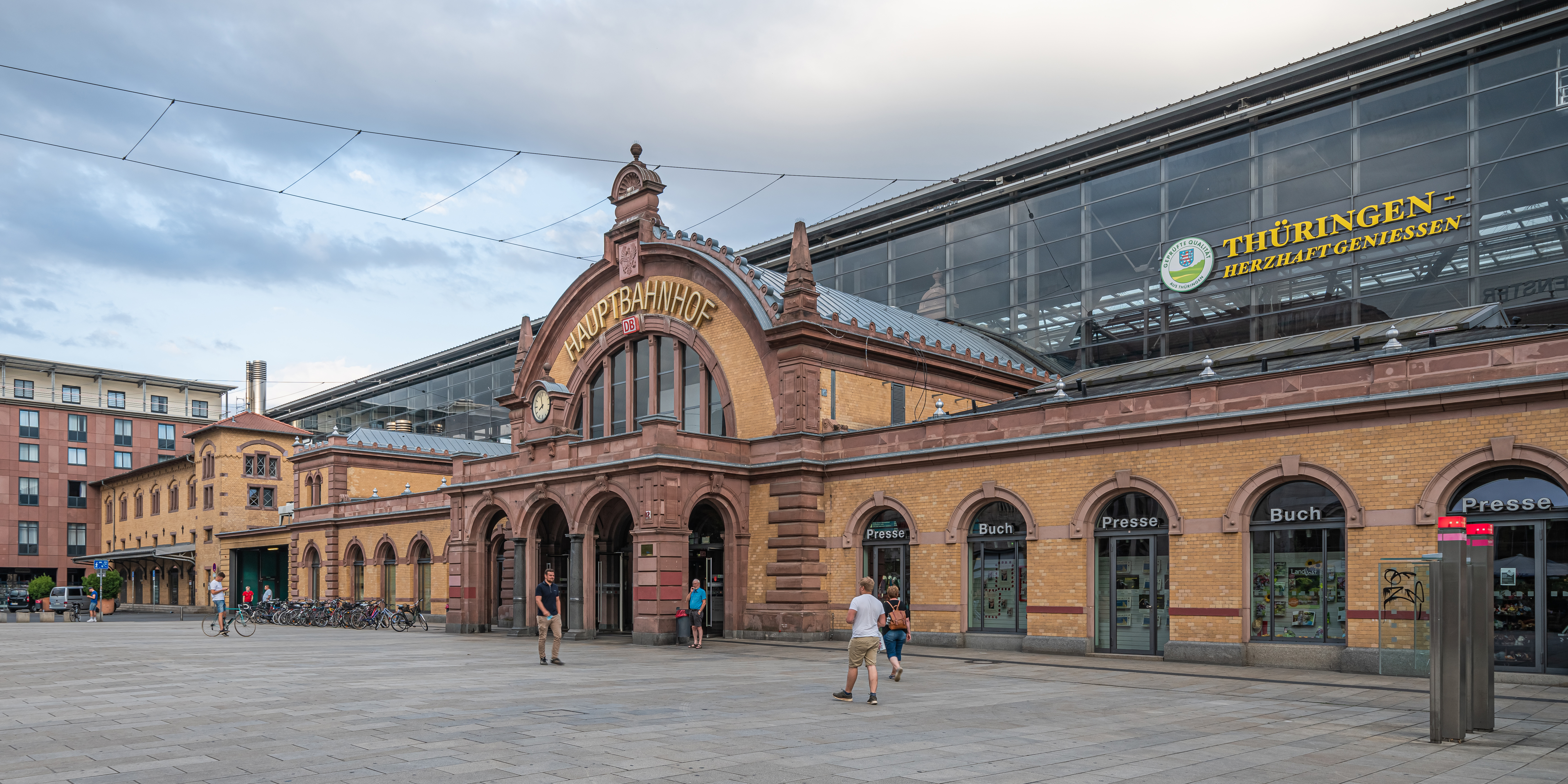
Erfurt Central Station is an important junction on the German rail network.

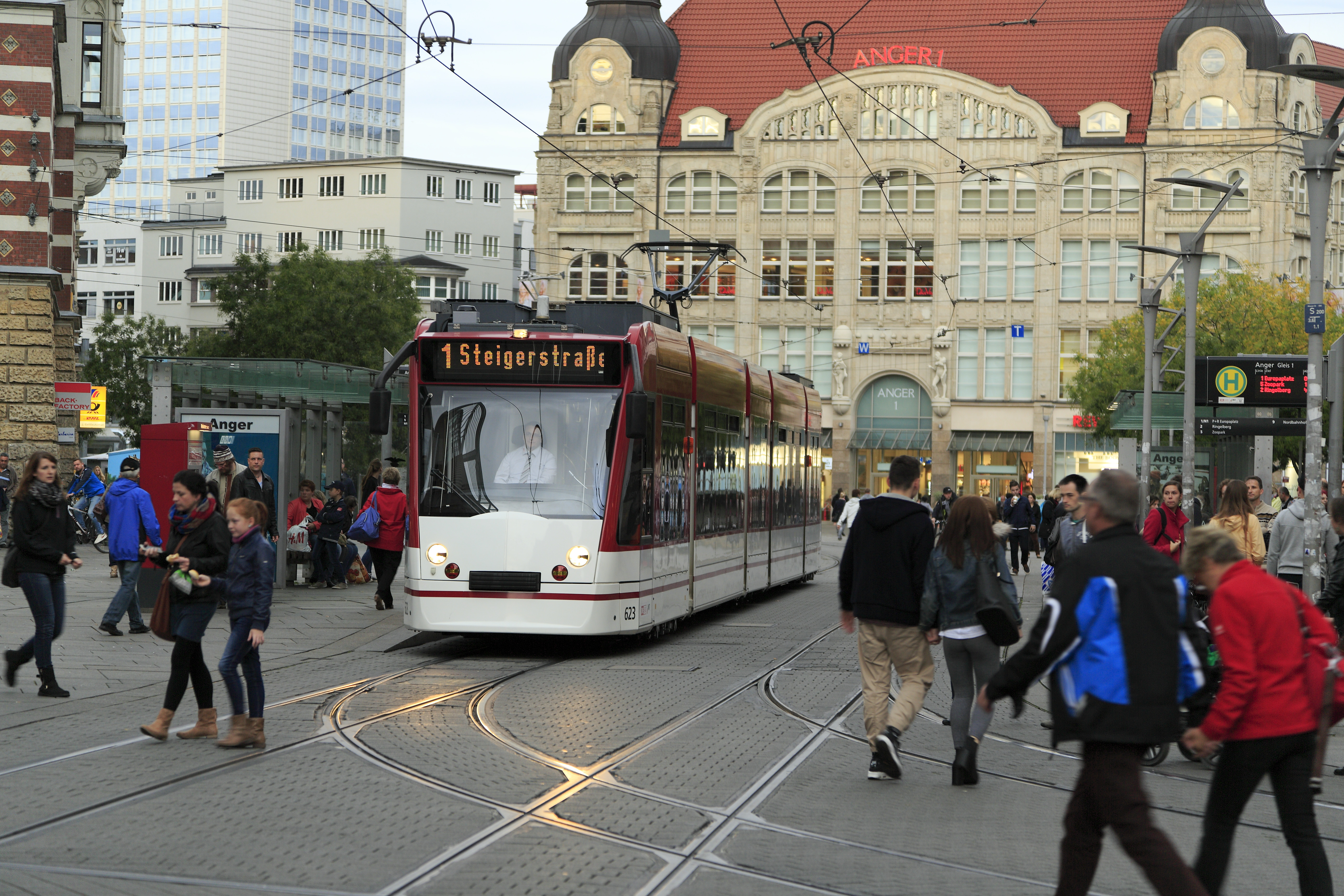
Erfurt Stadtbahn at Anger (city centre)

As Germany's most central state, Thuringia is an important hub of transit traffic. The transportation infrastructure was in very poor condition after the GDR period. Since 1990, many billions of Euros have been invested to improve the condition of roads and railways within Thuringia.

During the 1930s, the first two motorways were built across the Land, the A4 motorway as an important east–west connection in central Germany and the main link between Berlin and south-west Germany, and the A9 motorway as the main north–south route in eastern Germany, connecting Berlin with Munich. The A4 runs from Frankfurt in Hesse via Eisenach, Gotha, Erfurt, Weimar, Jena and Gera to Dresden in Saxony, connecting Thuringia's most important cities. At Hermsdorf junction it is connected with the A9. Both highways were widened from four to six lanes (three each way) after 1990, including some extensive re-routing in the Eisenach and Jena areas. Furthermore, three new motorways were built during the 1990s and 2000s. The A71 crosses the Land in southwest–northeast direction, connecting Würzburg in Bavaria via Meiningen, Suhl, Ilmenau, Arnstadt, Erfurt and Sömmerda with Sangerhausen and Halle in Saxony-Anhalt. The crossing of the Thuringian Forest by the A71 has been one of Germany's most expensive motorway segments with various tunnels (including Germany's longest road tunnel, the Rennsteig Tunnel) and large bridges. The A73 starts at the A71 south of Erfurt in Suhl and runs south towards Nuremberg in Bavaria. The A38 is another west–east connection in the north of Thuringia running from Göttingen in Lower Saxony via Heiligenstadt and Nordhausen to Leipzig in Saxony. Furthermore, there is a dense network of federal highways complementing the motorway network. The upgrading of federal highways is prioritised in the federal trunk road programme 2015 (Bundesverkehrswegeplan 2015). Envisaged projects include upgrades of the B247 from Gotha to Leinefelde to improve Mühlhausen's connection to the national road network, the B19 from Eisenach to Meiningen to improve access to Bad Salzungen and Schmalkalden, and the B88 and B281 for strengthening the Saalfeld/Rudolstadt region.

The first railways in Thuringia had been built in the 1840s and the network of main lines was finished around 1880. By 1920, many branch lines had been built, giving Thuringia one of the densest rail networks in the world before World War II with about 2,500 km of track. Between 1950 and 2000 most of the branch lines were abandoned, reducing Thuringia's network by half compared to 1940. On the other hand, most of the main lines were refurbished after 1990, resulting in improved speed of travel. The most important railway lines at present are the Thuringian Railway, connecting Halle and Leipzig via Weimar, Erfurt, Gotha and Eisenach with Frankfurt and Kassel and the Saal Railway from Halle/Leipzig via Jena and Saalfeld to Nuremberg. The former has an hourly ICE/IC service from Dresden to Frankfurt while the latter is served hourly by ICE trains from Berlin to Munich. In 2017, a new high speed line will be opened, diverting long-distance services from these mid-19th century lines. Both ICE routes will then use the Erfurt–Leipzig/Halle high-speed railway, and the Berlin-Munich route will continue via the Nuremberg–Erfurt high-speed railway. Only the segment west of Erfurt of the Frankfurt-Dresden line will continue to be used by ICE trains after 2017, with an increased line speed of 200 km/h (currently 160 km/h). Erfurt's central station, which was completely rebuilt for this purpose in the 2000s (decade), will be the new connection between both ICE lines. The most important regional railway lines in Thuringia are the Neudietendorf–Ritschenhausen railway from Erfurt to Würzburg and Meiningen, the Weimar–Gera railway from Erfurt to Chemnitz, the Sangerhausen–Erfurt railway from Erfurt to Magdeburg, the Gotha–Leinefelde railway from Erfurt to Göttingen, the Halle–Kassel railway from Halle via Nordhausen to Kassel and the Leipzig–Hof railway from Leipzig via Altenburg to Zwickau and Hof. Most regional and local lines have hourly service, but some run only every other hour.

A few small airports are in Thuringia. In public transport is Erfurt–Weimar Airport, used for charter flights to the Mediterranean and other holiday destinations. In private flights, Leipzig–Altenburg Airport is a further key airport.

International hub airports are Frankfurt Airport, Berlin Brandenburg Airport and Munich Airport in adjacent states.

Thuringia is the only state without barge or ship waterways; its rivers are too small to be navigable to them.

=== Energy and water supply ===
The traditional energy supply of Thuringia is lignite, mined in the bordering Leipzig region. Since 2000, the importance of environmentally unfriendly lignite combustion has declined in favour of renewable energies, which reached an amount of 40% (in 2013), and more clean gas combustion, often carried out as cogeneration in the municipal power stations. The most important forms of renewable energies are wind power and biomass, followed by solar energy and hydroelectricity. Furthermore, Thuringia hosts two big pumped storage stations: the Goldisthal Pumped Storage Station and the Hohenwarte Dam.

The water supply is granted by the big dams, like the Leibis-Lichte Dam, within the Thuringian Forest and the Thuringian Highland, making a drinking water exporter of Thuringia.

=== Health ===
Health care provision in Thuringia improved after 1990, as did the level of general health. Life expectancy rose, nevertheless it is still a bit lower than the German average. This is caused by a relatively unhealthy lifestyle of the Thuringians, especially in high consumption of grains, industrial seed oils, refined carbohydrates and alcohol, which led to significant higher rates of obesity compared to the German average.

Health care in Thuringia is currently undergoing a concentration process. Many smaller hospitals in the rural towns are closing, whereas the bigger ones in centres like Jena and Erfurt get enlarged. Overall, there is an oversupply of hospital beds, caused by rationalisation processes in the German health care system, so that many smaller hospitals generate losses. On the other hand, there is a lack of family doctors, especially in rural regions with increased need of health care provision because of overageing.

== Education ==
In Germany, the educational system is part of the sovereignty of the Länder; therefore each Land has its own school and college system.

=== School system ===
The Thuringian school system was developed after the reunification in 1990, combining some elements of the former GDR school system with the Bavarian school system. Most German school rankings attest that Thuringia has one of the most successful education systems in Germany, resulting in high-quality outcomes.

Early-years education is quite common in Thuringia. Since the 1950s, nearly all children have been using the service, whereas early-years education is less developed in western Germany. Its inventor Friedrich Fröbel lived in Thuringia and founded the world's first Kindergartens there in the 19th century. The Thuringian primary school takes four years and most primary schools are all-day schools offering optional extracurricular activities in the afternoon. At the age of ten, pupils are separated according to aptitude and proceed to either the Gymnasium or the Regelschule. The former leads to the Abitur exam after a further eight years and prepares for higher education, while the latter has a more vocational focus and finishes with exams after five or six years, comparable to the Hauptschule and Realschule found elsewhere in Germany.

Thuringia is home to a K-12 international school in the city of Weimar, Thuringia International School (ThIS). The school was established in the year 2000 and is accredited by the Council of International Schools and authorised to offer the International Baccalaureate PYP, MYP and DP. Students who graduate from the school are able to gain admission to colleges and universities around the world.

== Universities ==
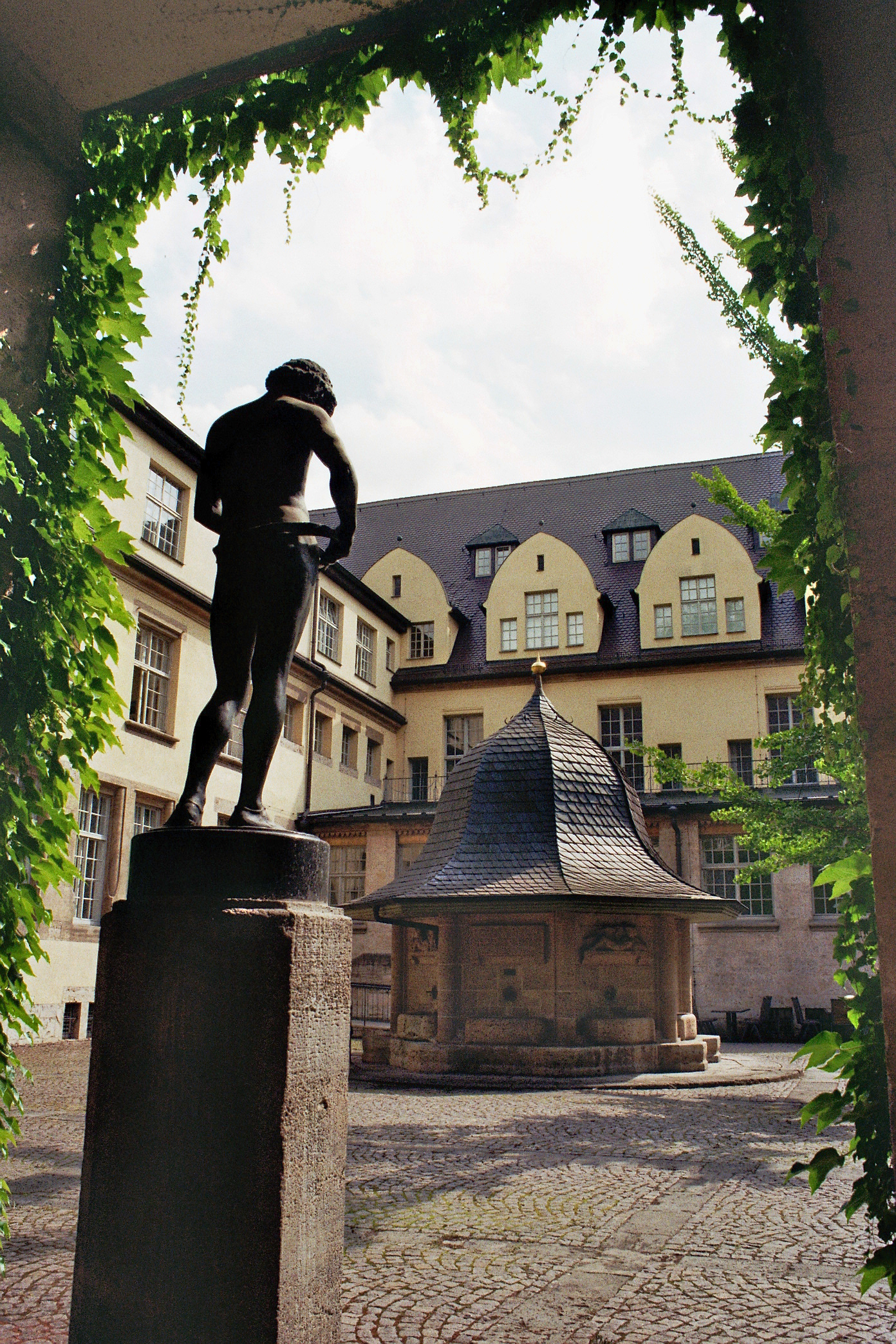
Friedrich Schiller University Jena is the largest university in Thuringia and one of the best in Germany.

The German higher education system comprises two forms of academic institutions: universities and polytechnics (Fachhochschule). The University of Jena is the biggest amongst Thuringia's four universities and offers nearly every discipline. It was founded in 1558, and today has 21,000 students. The second-largest is the Technische Universität Ilmenau with 7,000 students, founded in 1894, which offers many technical disciplines such as engineering and mathematics. The University of Erfurt, founded in 1392, has 5,000 students today and an emphasis on humanities and teacher training. The Bauhaus University Weimar with 4,000 students is Thuringia's smallest university, specialising in creative subjects such as architecture and arts. It was founded in 1860 and came to prominence as Germany's leading art school during the inter-war period, the Bauhaus.

The polytechnics of Thuringia are based in Erfurt (4,500 students), Jena (5,000 students), Nordhausen (2,500 students) and Schmalkalden (3,000 students). In addition, there is a civil service college in Gotha with 500 students, the College of Music "Franz Liszt" in Weimar (800 students) as well as two private colleges, the Adam-Ries-Fachhochschule in Erfurt (500 students) and the SRH College for nursing and allied medical subjects (SRH Fachhochschule für Gesundheit Gera) in Gera (500 students). The most recent institution of higher education in Thuringia is the Duale Hochschule Gera-Eisenach (1400 students), a cooperative state college founded in 2016 through a merger of the colleges (Berufsakademie) in Gera and Eisenach.

=== Research ===
Thuringia's leading research centre is Jena, followed by Ilmenau. Both focus on technology, in particular life sciences and optics at Jena and information technology at Ilmenau. Erfurt is a centre of Germany's horticultural research, whereas Weimar and Gotha with their various archives and libraries are centres of historic and cultural research. Most of the research in Thuringia is publicly funded basic research due to the lack of large companies able to invest significant amounts in applied research, with the notable exception of the optics sector at Jena.

== Personalities ==
- Georg Böhm (1661–1733), composer and organist of the Baroque period, born in Hohenkirchen
- Johann Sebastian Bach (1685–1750), composer and musician of the Baroque period, born in Eisenach
- Franz Liszt (1811–1886), Hungarian composer, virtuoso pianist, conductor, teacher and Franciscan tertiary, lived in Weimar
- Richard Wagner (1813–1883), composer, theatre director, polemicist, and conductor, sojourns in Weimar and Eisenach
- Richard Strauss (1864–1949), composer of the late Romantic and early modern eras, director of the Weimar Court Orchestra (Hofkapellmeister)
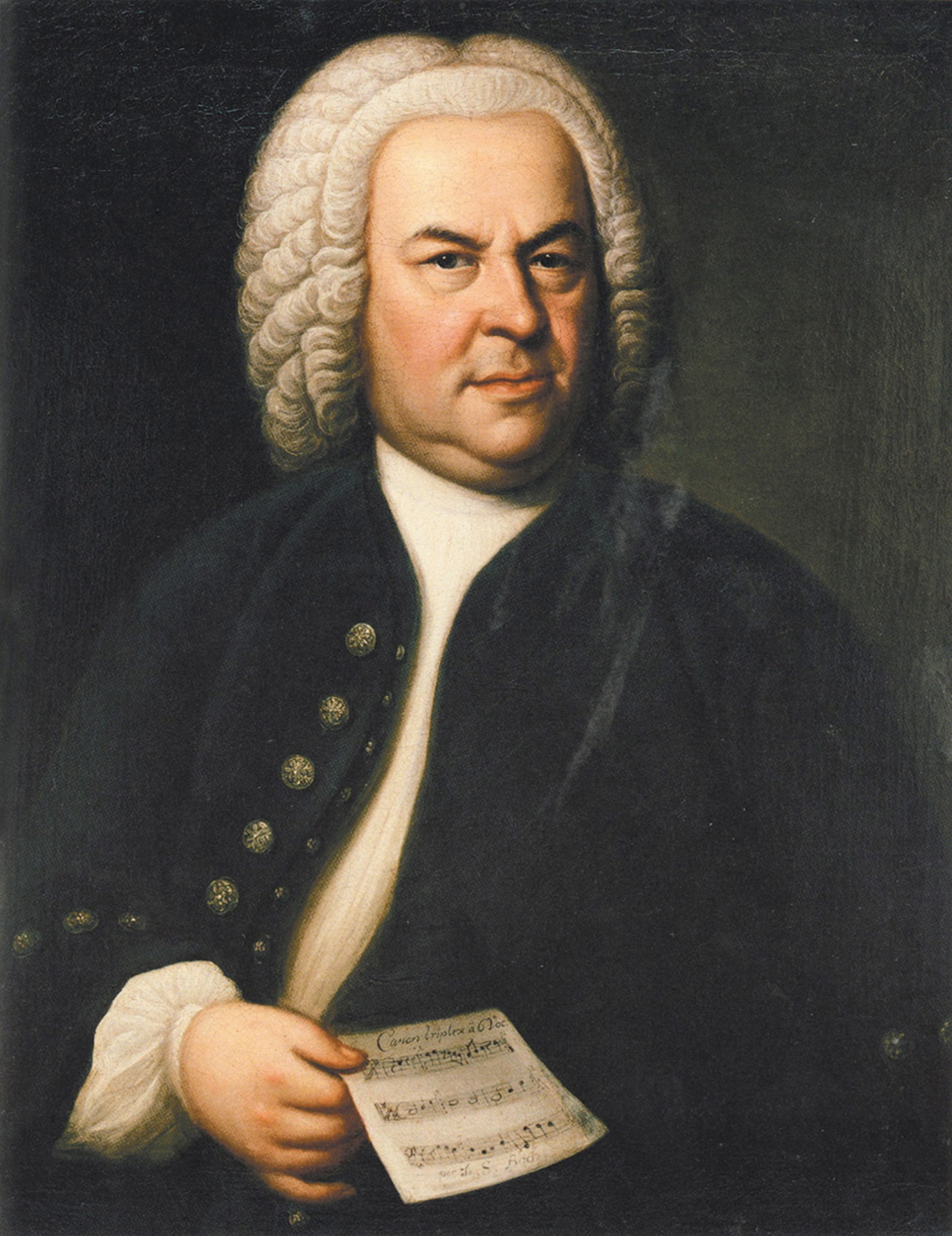
  Johann Sebastian Bach
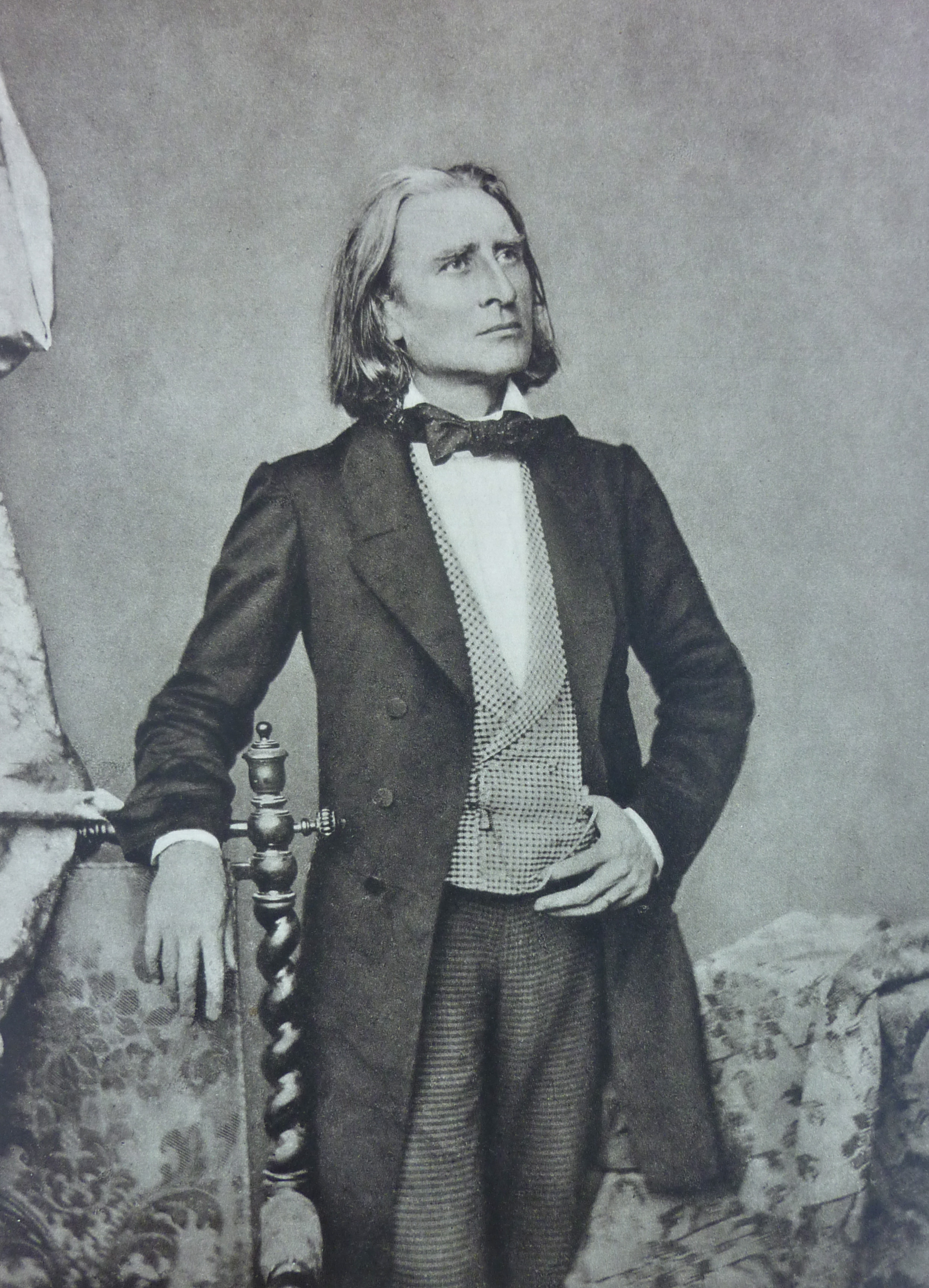
  Franz Liszt
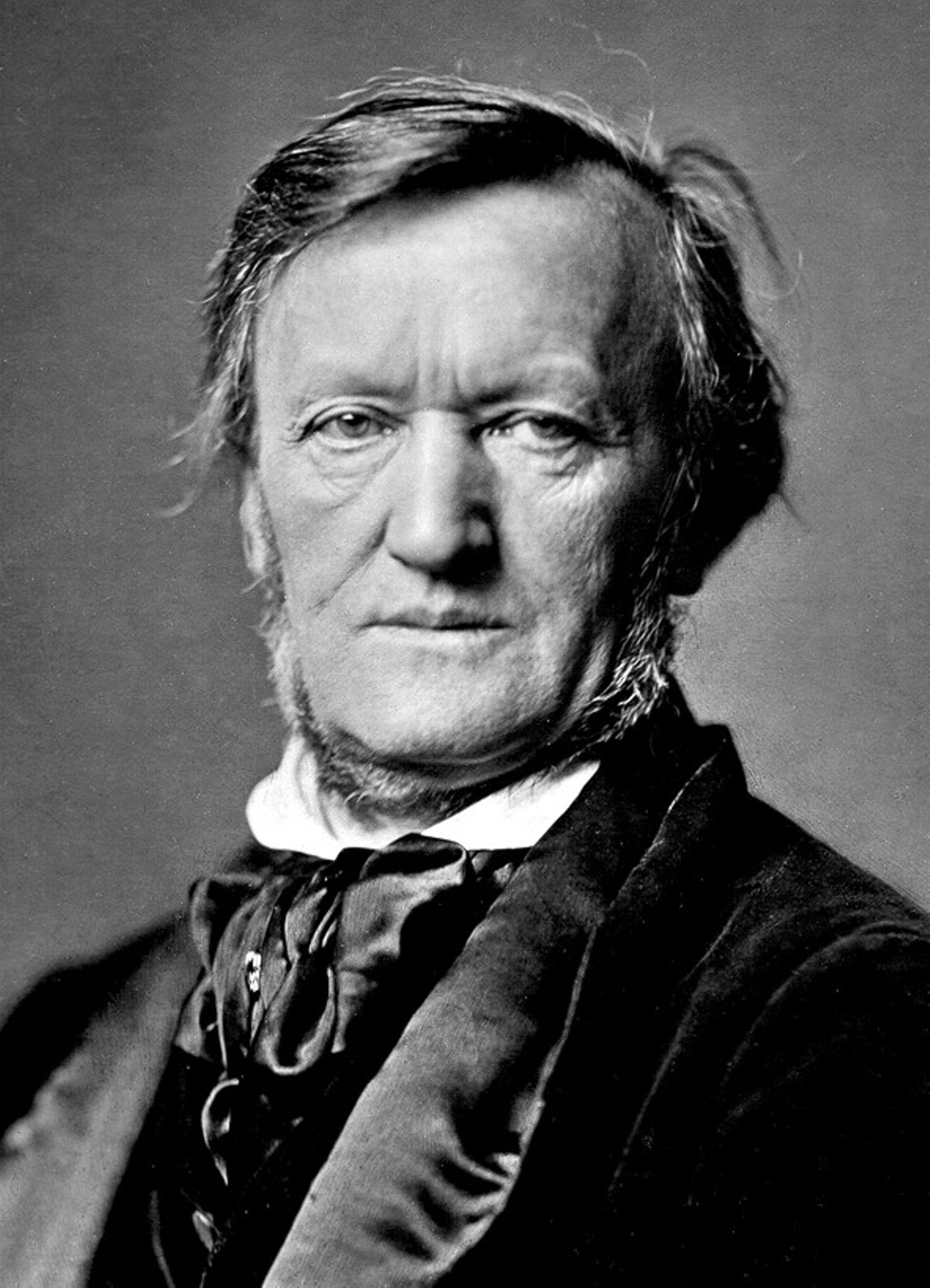
  Richard Wagner
- Martin Luther (1483–1546), friar (Observant Augustinian), Catholic priest, professor of theology and seminal figure of the 16th-century movement in Christianity known later as the Protestant Reformation, educated in Eisenach, translation of the New Testament from Greek into German at Wartburg castle
- Johann Wolfgang von Goethe (1749–1832), writer and statesman, went to live in Weimar
- Friedrich von Schiller (1759–1805), poet, philosopher, historian, and playwright; professor of history at the University of Jena before relocating to Weimar
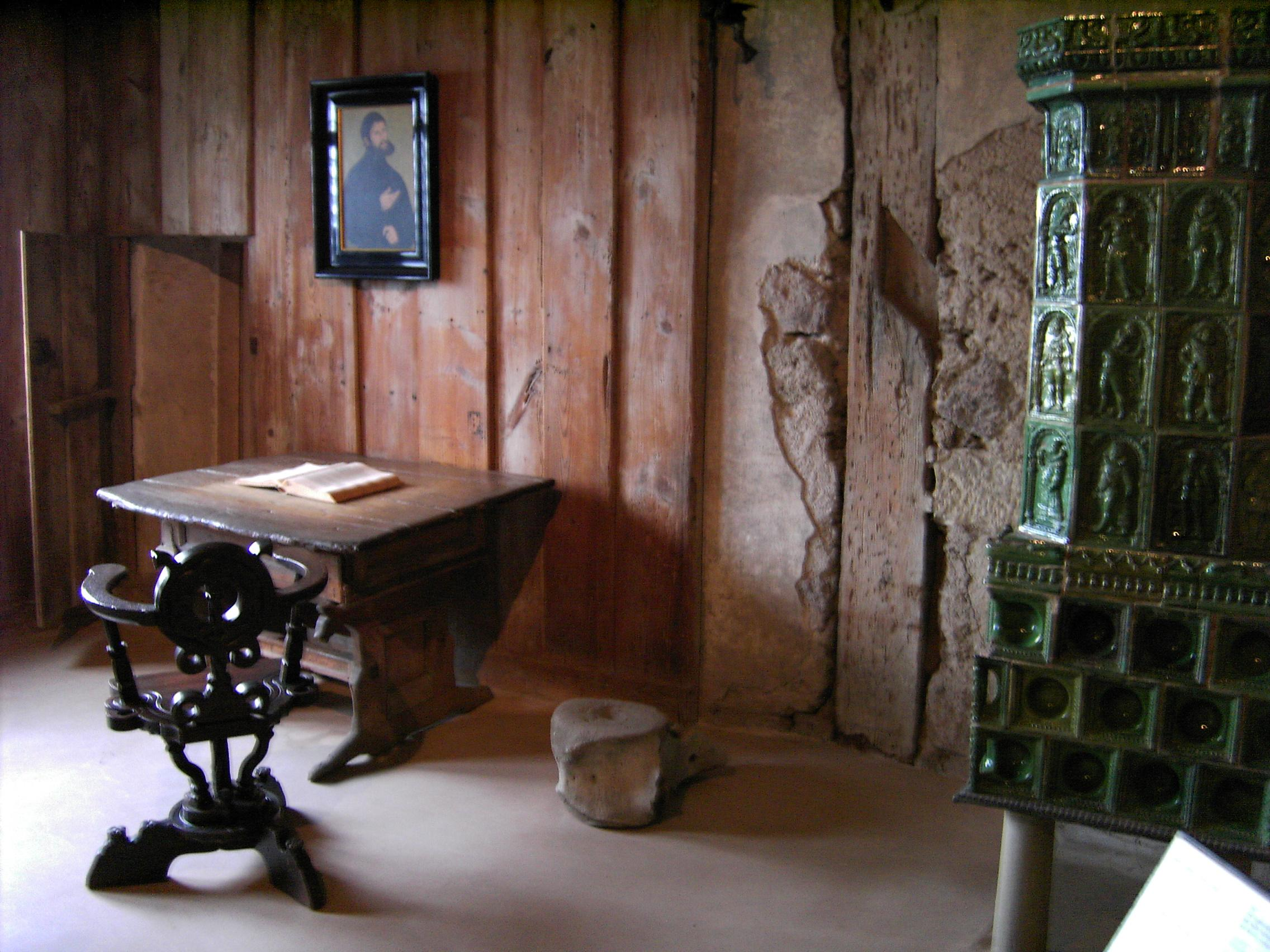
  Chamber of Martin Luther at Wartburg castle
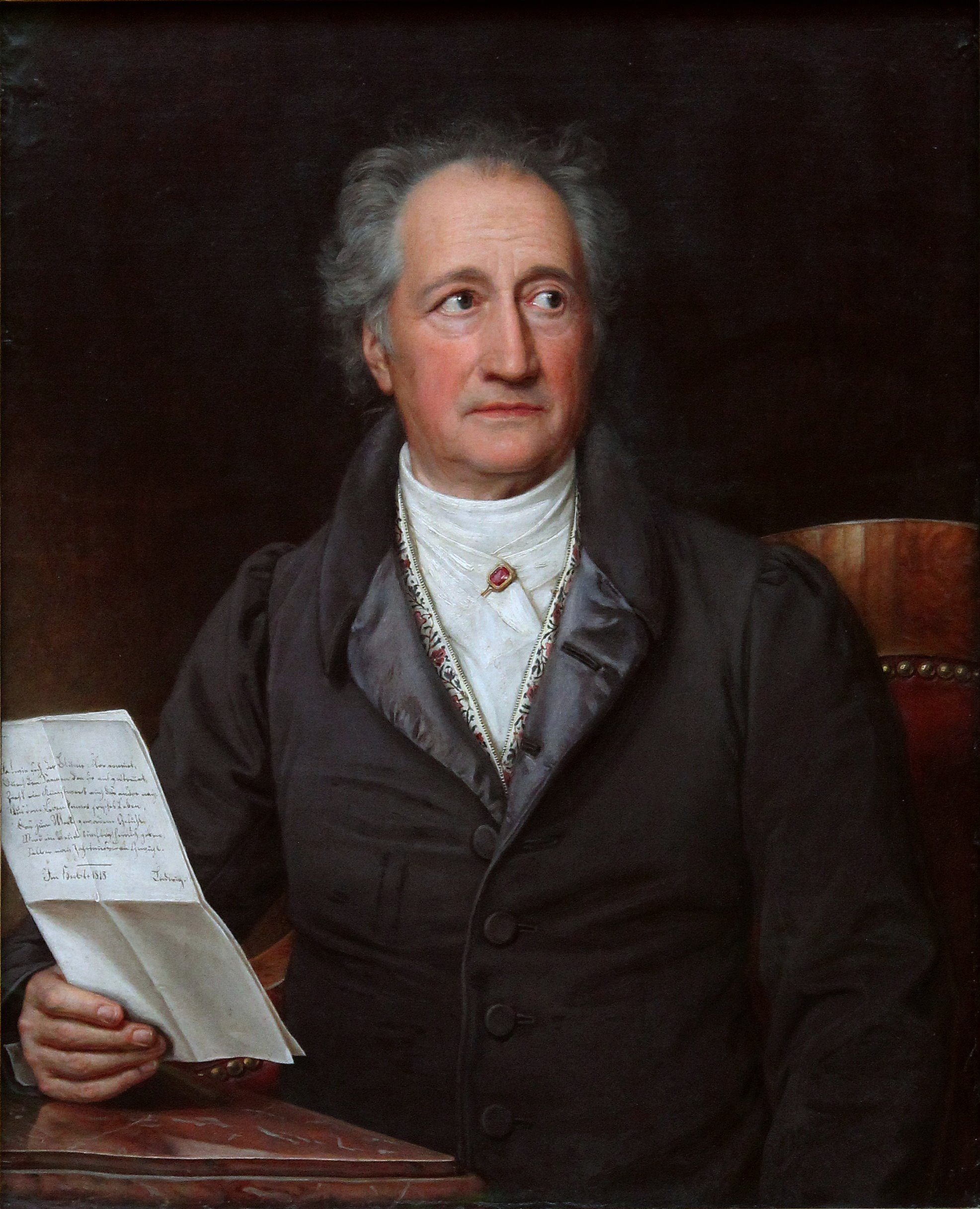
  Johann Wolfgang von Goethe
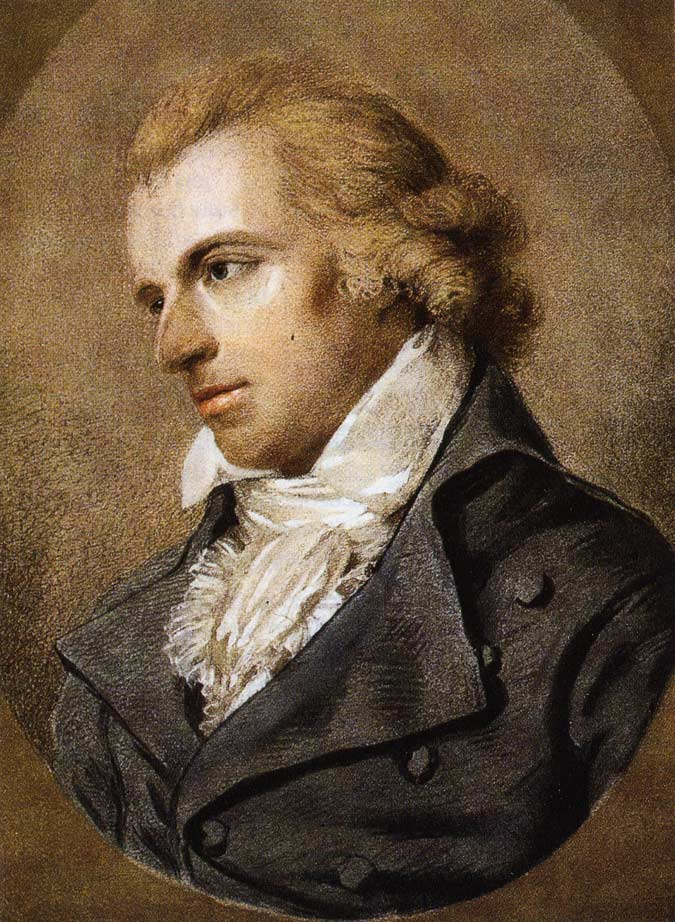
  Friedrich Schiller
- Meister Eckhart O.P. (c. 1260 – c. 1328), theologian, philosopher and mystic, born near Gotha
- Lucas Cranach the Elder (1472–1553), Renaissance painter and printmaker in woodcut and engraving, lived his last years in Weimar
- Johann Gottfried von Herder (1744–1803), philosopher, theologian, poet, and literary critic, introduces the Zeitgeist in Kritische Wälder (1769), served as General Superintendent in Weimar
- Christoph Wilhelm Hufeland (1762–1836), physician, most eminent practical physician of his time in Germany, born in Langensalza
- Napoléon Bonaparte (1769–1821), French military and political leader, twin battle of Jena-Auerstedt, 14 October 1806, met Johann Wolfgang von Goethe at the governor's palace in Erfurt in the presence of Talleyrand, 2 October 1808 ("Vous êtes un homme. Quel âge avez-vous ? – Soixante ans. – Vous êtes bien conservé. Vous avez écrit des tragédies ?") ("Voilà un homme")
- Georg Wilhelm Friedrich Hegel (1770–1831), philosopher, author of the Phenomenology of Spirit, extraordinary Professor at University of Jena
- Carl Zeiss (1816–1888), maker of optical instruments commonly known for the company he founded, Carl Zeiss Jena, born in Weimar
- Karl Marx (1818–1883), philosopher, economist, social scientist, sociologist, historian, journalist, and revolutionary socialist, PhD awarded by University of Jena
- August Schleicher (1821–1868), linguist, he attempted to reconstruct the Proto-Indo-European language
- Johannes Brahms (1833–1897), composer and pianist, frequent sojourns at Meiningen
- Ernst Haeckel (1834–1919), biologist, naturalist, philosopher, physician, professor, and artist, discovered, described, and named thousands of new species, mapped a genealogical tree relating all life forms, coined many terms in biology, including anthropogeny, ecology, phylum, phylogeny, and stem cell, professor at University of Jena
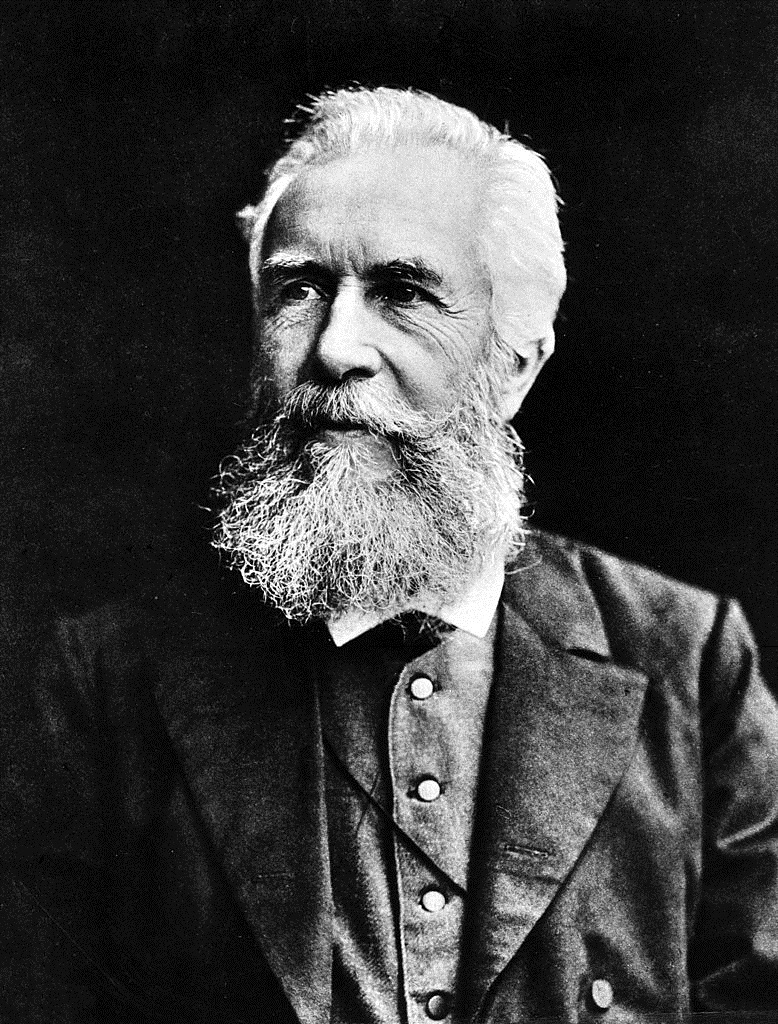
  Ernst Haeckel
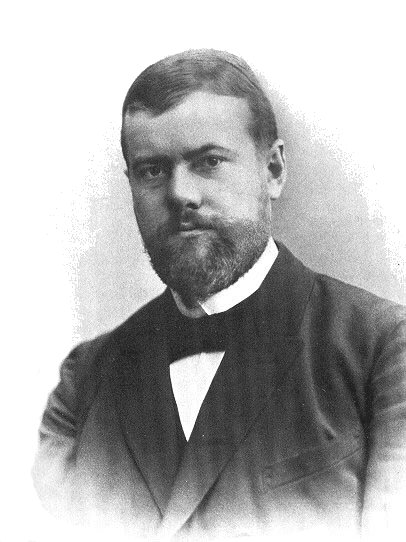
  Max Weber
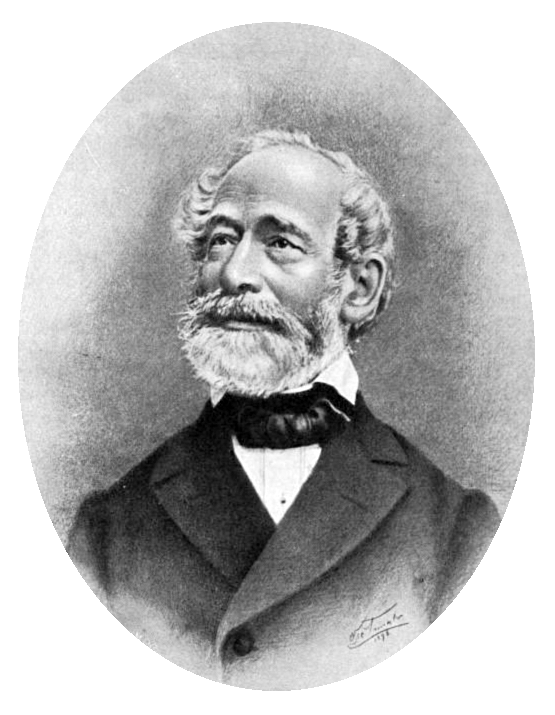
  Carl Zeiss
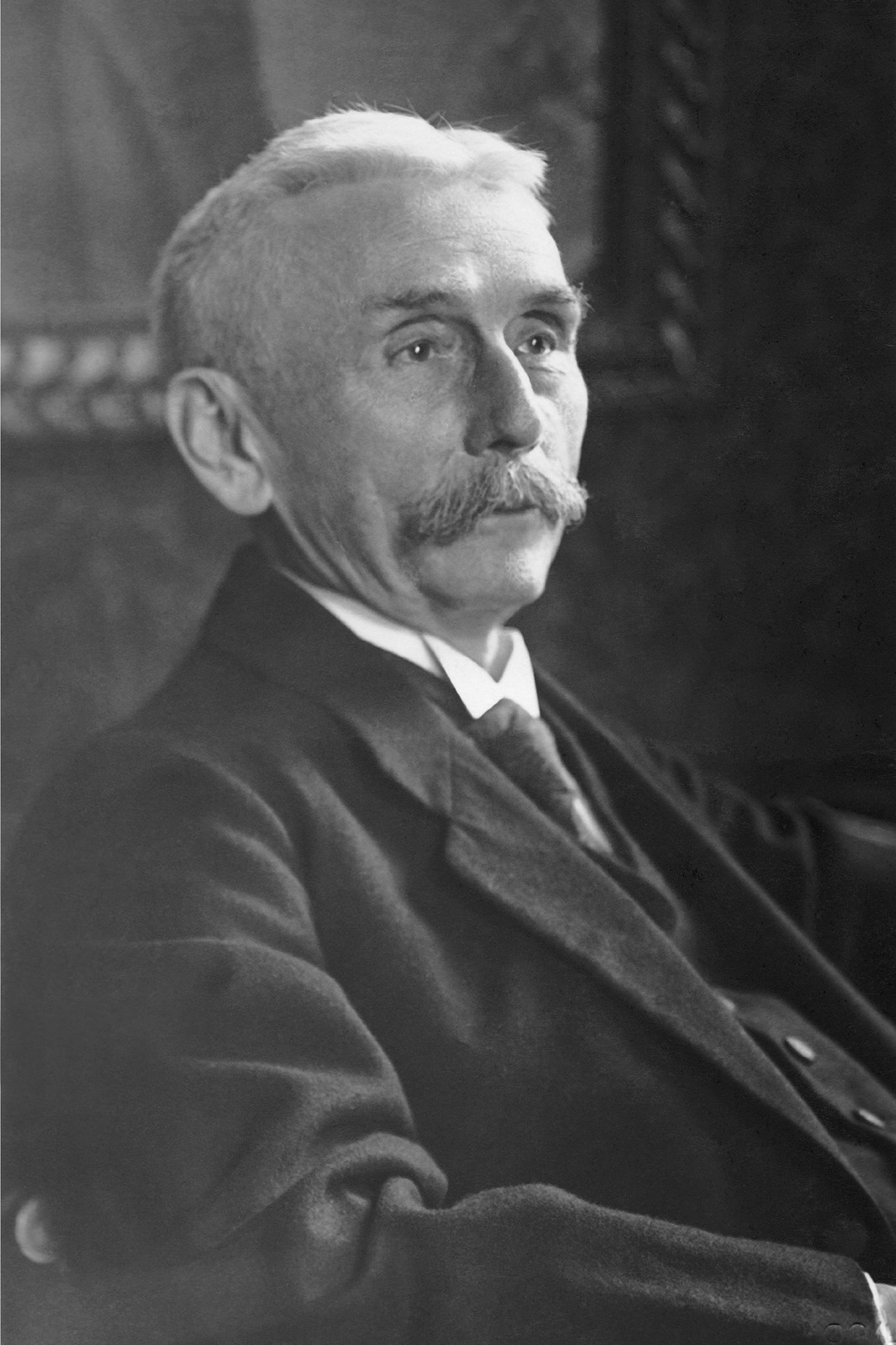
  Otto Schott
- Ernst Abbe (1840–1905), physicist, optical scientist, entrepreneur, and social reformer, laid the foundations of modern optics, co-owner of Carl Zeiss Jena, born in Eisenach
- Friedrich Wilhelm Nietzsche (1844–1900), philologist, philosopher, cultural critic, poet and composer, lived his last years in Weimar
- Gottlob Frege (1848–1925), mathematician, logician, and philosopher, professor at University of Jena
- Otto Schott (1851–1935), chemist, glass technologist, and the inventor of borosilicate glass, founder of Jenaer Glaswerk Schott & Genossen
- Rudolf Steiner (1861–1925), Austrian philosopher, social reformer, architect, and esotericist, worked to establish various practical endeavors, including Waldorf education, biodynamic agriculture, and anthroposophical medicine, invited to work as an editor at the Goethe Matenadaran in Weimar
- Henry van de Velde (1863–1957), Belgian painter, architect and interior designer, established the Weimar Saxon-Grand Ducal Art School, the predecessor of the Bauhaus
- Max Weber (1864–1920), sociologist, philosopher, and political economist, often cited as among the three founding creators of sociology, born in Erfurt
- Richard Strauss (1864–1949), leading German composer of the late Romantic and early modern eras, director of the Weimar Court Orchestra (Hofkapellmeister) 1889–94
- Vassily Kandinsky (1866–1944), influential Russian painter and art theorist, credited with painting the first purely abstract works, Bauhaus master, Weimar
- Lyonel Feininger (1871–1956), German-American painter and leading exponent of Expressionism, also worked as a caricaturist and comic strip artist, Bauhaus master, Weimar
- Léon Blum (1872–1950), French politician, three times Prime Minister of France, imprisoned in Buchenwald
- Paul Klee (1879–1940), Swiss German painter; his highly individual style was influenced by movements in art that included expressionism, cubism, and surrealism, Bauhaus master, Weimar
- Walter Gropius (1883–1969), architect, widely regarded as one of the pioneering masters of modern architecture, founder of the Bauhaus, Weimar
- Ludwig Mies van der Rohe (1886–1969), German-American architect, widely regarded as one of the pioneering masters of modern architecture, joined the Bauhaus, Weimar
- Jean Arp (1886–1966), German-French, or Alsatian, sculptor, painter, poet and abstract artist, studied at the Weimar Saxon-Grand Ducal Art School, the predecessor of the Bauhaus
- Otto Dix (1891–1969), painter and printmaker, noted for his ruthless and harshly realistic depictions of Weimar society and the brutality of war, born in Untermhaus (today Gera)
- Cuno Hoffmeister (1892–1968), German astronomer, observer and discoverer of variable stars, comets and minor planets, founder of Sonneberg Observatory.
- Werner Braune (1909–1951), Nazi SS officer, executed for war crimes
- Uziel Gal (1923–2002), Israeli gun designer, best remembered as the designer and namesake of the Uzi submachine gun, born in Weimar
- Jorge Semprún (1923–2011), Spanish writer and politician, deported to Buchenwald, realization of "Mère blafarde, tendre sœur" for the Kunstfest art festival, Weimar, summer 1995
- Herbert Kroemer (1928-2024), German-American physicist, co-laureate of the Nobel Prize in Physics 2000
- Marcel Kittel (born 1988 in Arnstadt), professional cyclist
- Michael Roth (1936–2019), engineer

== Sources ==
- Blaschke, Karlheinz (2002). "Die Leipziger Teilung der wettinischen Länder von 1485". Beiträge zur Verfassungs- und Verwaltungsgeschichte Sachsens: Ausgewählte Aufsätze von Karlheinz Blaschke. Leipzig: Leipziger Universitätsverlag. pp. 323–335.
- Groß, Reiner (2007). Die Wettiner. Stuttgart: Kohlhammer Verlag.
- Heinze, Erich (1925). "Die Entwicklung der Pfalzgrafschaft Sachsen bis ins 14. Jahrhundert". Sachsen und Anhalt: Jahrbuch der Historischen Kommission für die Provinz Sachsen und für Anhalt. 1: 20–63.
- Reuter, Timothy (1992). The Annals of Fulda. Manchester: Manchester University Press.
- Reuter, Timothy (2013) [1991]. Germany in the Early Middle Ages c. 800–1056. London and New York: Routledge.
- Tebruck, Stefan (2005). "Zwischen Integration und Selbstbehauptung: Thüringen im wettinischen Herrschaftsbereich". Fragen der politischen Integration im mittelalterlichen Europa. Ostfildern: Jan Thorbecke Verlag. pp. 375–412, 589–591.
- Whaley, Joachim (2012a). Germany and the Holy Roman Empire, I: From Maximilian I to the Peace of Westphalia 1493-1648. Vol. 1. New York: Oxford University Press.
- Whaley, Joachim (2012b). Germany and the Holy Roman Empire, II: From the Peace of Westphalia to the Dissolution of the Reich 1648-1806. Vol. 2. New York: Oxford University Press.
- Wilson, Peter H. (2016). Heart of Europe: A History of the Holy Roman Empire. Cambridge: Harvard University Press.
