= Sandersdorf-Brehna =

- Town
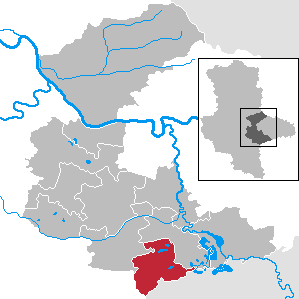
- Location of Sandersdorf-Brehna within Anhalt-Bitterfeld district
- Interactive map of Sandersdorf-Brehna
- Location within Germany Location within Saxony-Anhalt
- Coordinates: 51°37′N 12°14′E
- Country: Germany
- State: Saxony-Anhalt
- District: Anhalt-Bitterfeld

Government
  - Mayor (2021–28): Steffi Syska

Area
  - Total: 81.84 km^{2} (31.60 sq mi)
- Elevation: 90 m (300 ft)

Population (2025-12-31)
  - Total: 14,012
  - Density: 171.2/km^{2} (443.4/sq mi)
- Time zone: UTC+01:00 (CET)
  - Summer (DST): UTC+02:00 (CEST)
- Postal codes: 06792, 06796
- Dialling codes: 03493, 034954
- Vehicle registration: ABI
- Website: www.sandersdorf-brehna.de

Sandersdorf-Brehna (German pronunciation: [ˈzandɐsdɔʁf ˈbʁeːna]) is a town in the district of Anhalt-Bitterfeld, in Saxony-Anhalt, Germany. It is situated southwest of Bitterfeld. The town was formed by the merger of the previously independent town Brehna and the municipalities Glebitzsch, Petersroda, Roitzsch and Sandersdorf, on 1 July 2009.

== Geography ==
The town Sandersdorf-Brehna consists of the following Ortschaften or municipal divisions:

- Brehna
- Glebitzsch
- Heideloh
- Petersroda
- Ramsin
- Renneritz
- Roitzsch
- Zscherndorf

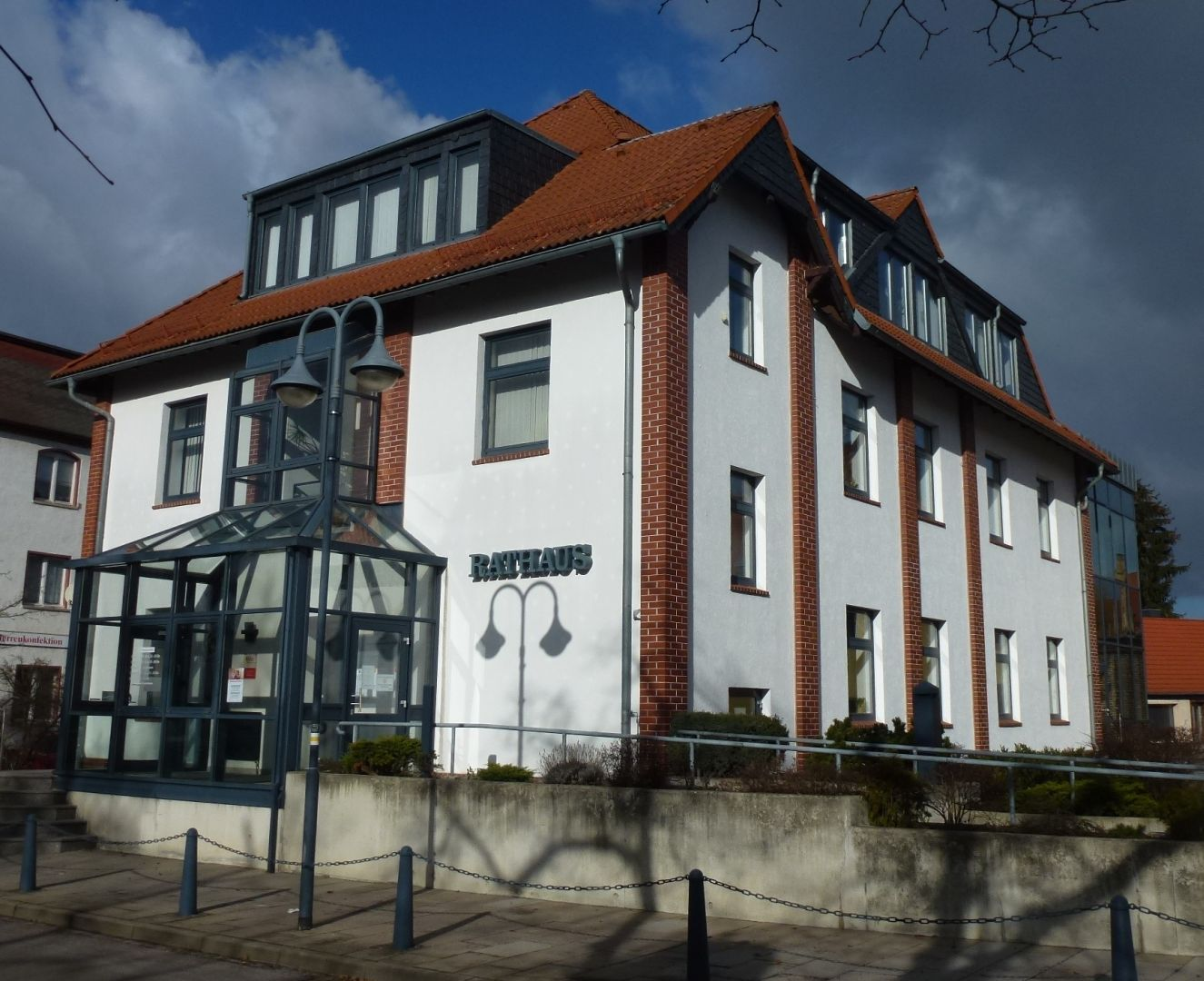
Sandersdorf Town-hall

== Population development ==
| Year | 1880 | 1910 | 1964 | 1985 | 2005 | 2009 | 2013 | 2015 |
| Inhabitants | 1.000 | 2.948 | 5.440 | 8.400 | 9.905 | 9.748 | 14.635 | 14.951 |

=== Local council ===
The local council has 28 members, elections were held in May 2014.

| Party | Seats |
| CDU | 14 |
| Die Linke | 4 |
| SPD | 2 |
| Freie Wähler | 3 |
| Unabhängiges Bündnis | 4 |
| Independent | 1 |
| Total | 28 |

Steffi Syska was elected mayor in October 2021. She succeeded Andy Grabner, who had been re-elected in April 2015 with 91.4% of the votes for a second term.

== Sons and daughters of the town ==
- Johann Gottfried Schnabel (pseudonym: Gisander ; 1692-between 1751 and 1758), author of the Enlightenment
- Arthur Golf (1877–1941), agronomist
- Kurt Waitzmann (1905-1985), film actor and voice actor
- Dieter Engelhardt (born 1938), football player
- Horst Jankhöfer (born 1942), handball player
- Werner Peter (born 1950), footballer
