= Electorate of Saxony =

State of the Holy Roman Empire (1356–1806)

Coordinates: 51°15′N 13°30′E

Electorate of Saxony Kurfürstentum Sachsen (German)
- 1356–1806
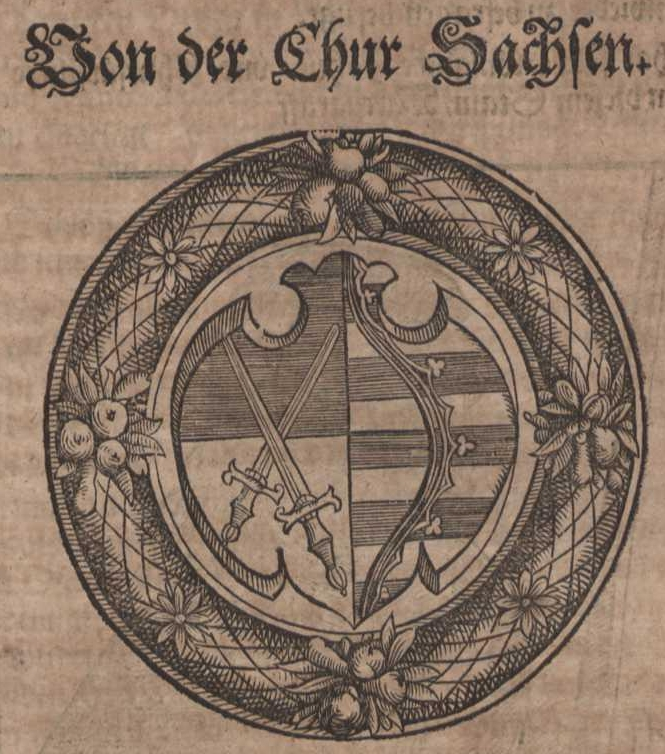
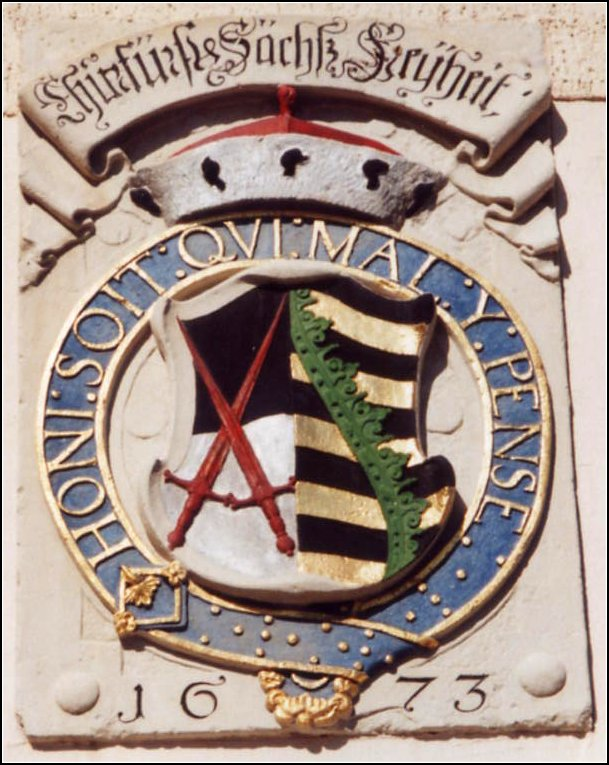
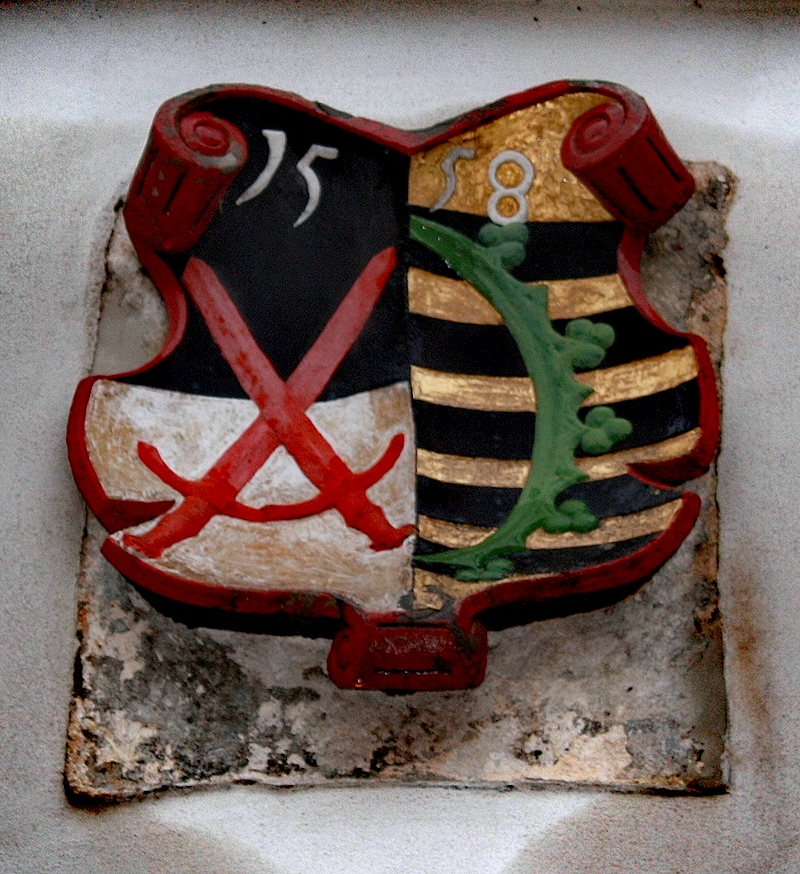
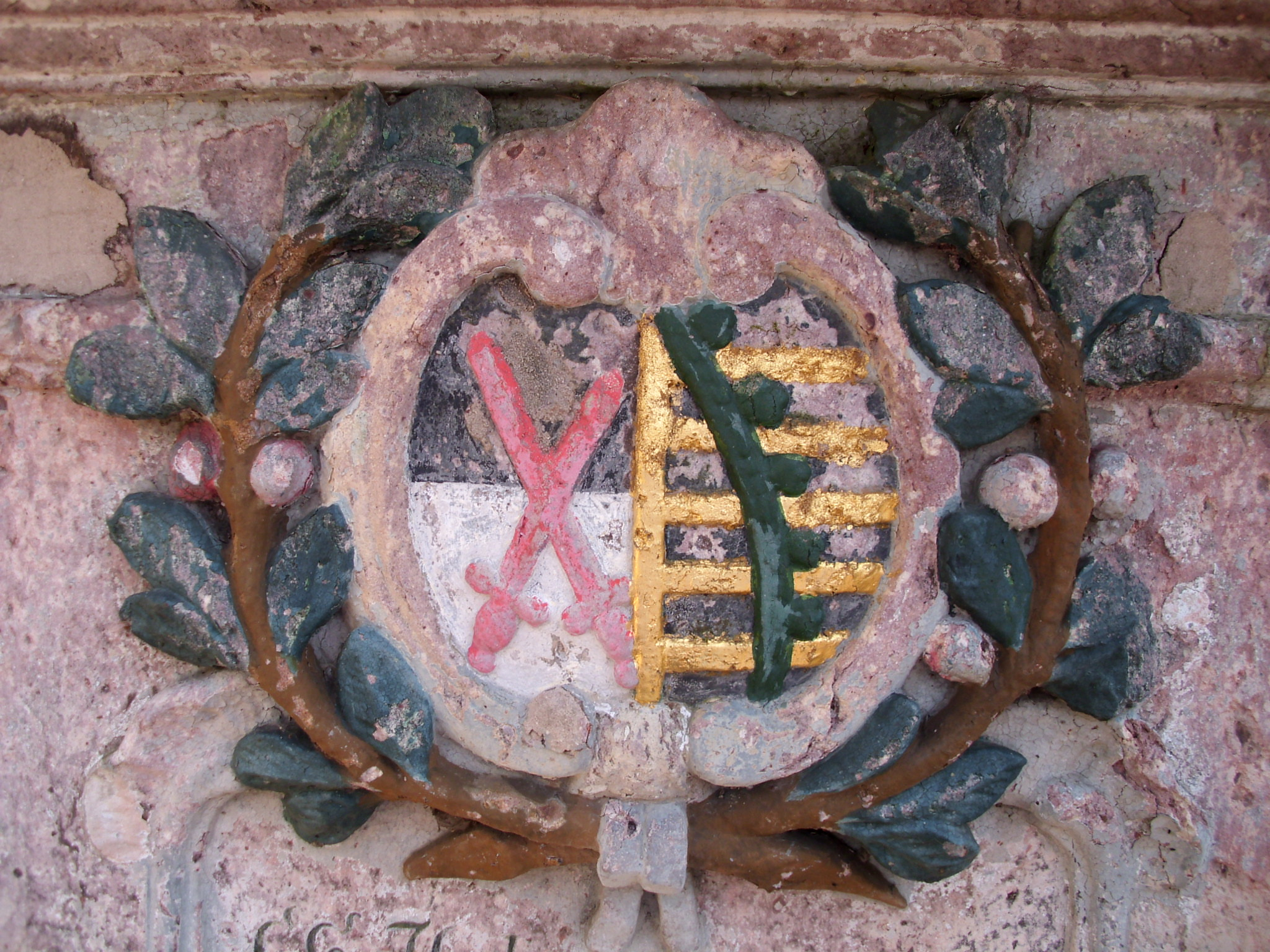
- Top: Electoral flag; Bottom: State flag; Coat of arms (Note: Based on many preserved contemporary depictions: Coat of Arms of Electoral Saxony. In: Theatrum Saxonicum (Volume 1). 1608 A coat of arms of the Elector of Saxony, over the entrance to the Electoral Hall in Stolpen (Saxony state, Germany). Schwarzenberg Castle, 1558 Marienberg, 1773)

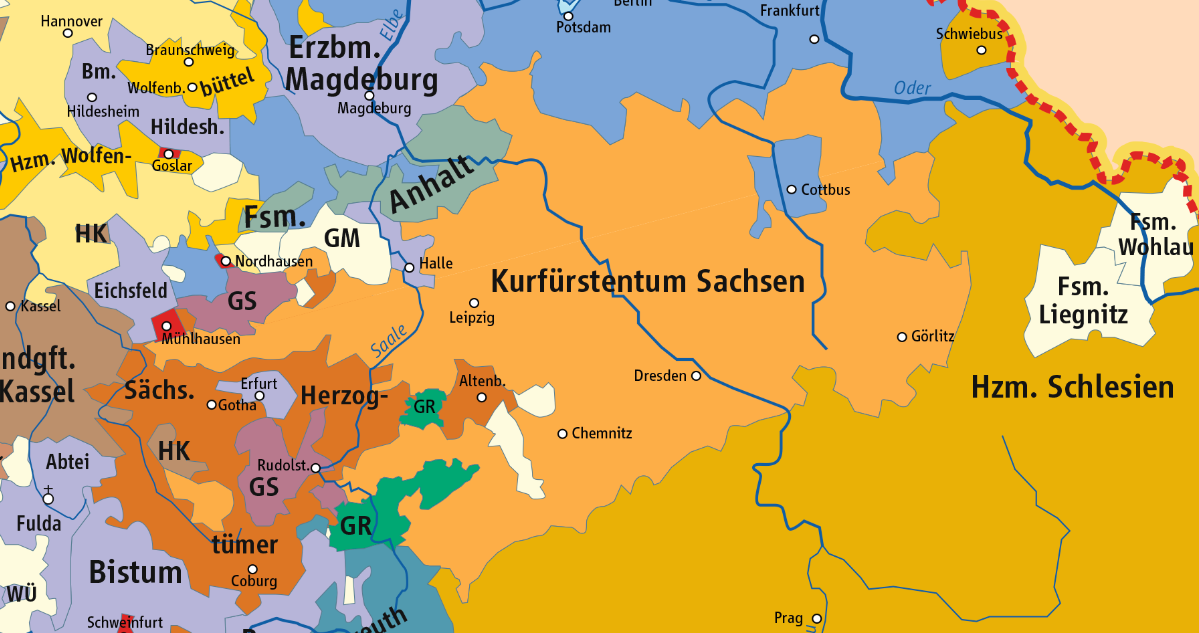
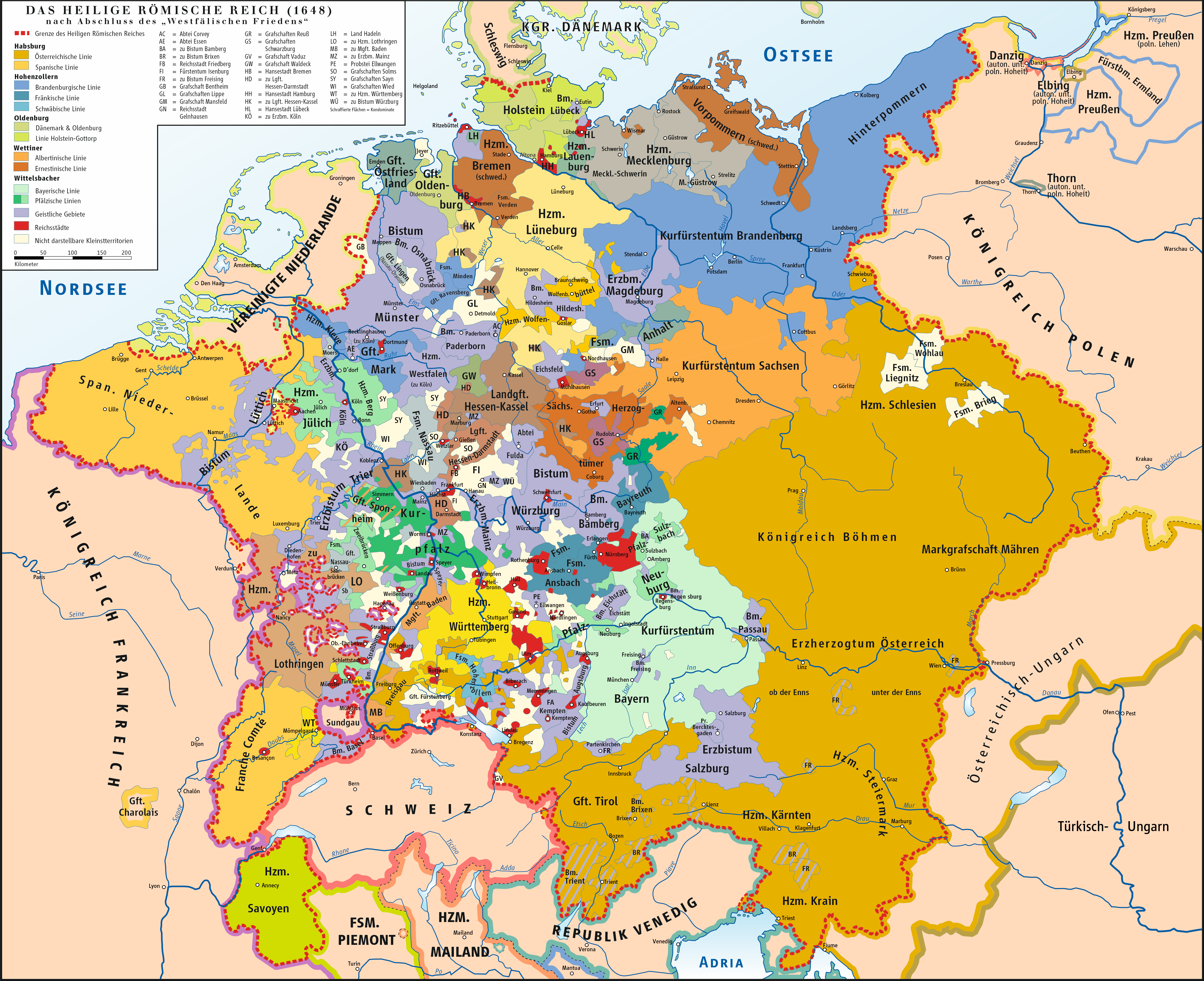
- Electoral Saxony within the Holy Roman Empire at the 1648 Peace of Westphalia The Holy Roman Empire at the 1648 Peace of Westphalia
- Status: State of the Holy Roman Empire and Imperial Electorate; Personal union with Polish–Lithuanian Commonwealth (1697–1706 and 1709–1763)
- Capital: Wittenberg (1356–1547); Dresden (1547–1806)
- Religion: Dominant confession: Roman Catholic (until 1520s), Lutheran (from 1520s); Elector: Roman Catholic until 1525, then Lutheran until 1697, then again Roman Catholic from 1697
- Government: Feudal monarchy
- Prince-Elector
  - 1356: Rudolph I (first)
  - 1419–1422: Albert III (last Ascanian)
  - 1423–1428: Frederick I (first Wettin)
  - 1763–1806: Frederick Augustus III (of Wettin, last)
- Historical era: Early modern Europe
  - Golden Bull: 10 January 1356
  - Merged with Meissen and Thuringia: 6 January 1423
  - Treaty of Leipzig: 26 August 1485
  - Capitulation of Wittenberg: 19 May 1547
  - Acquired Lusatia by Peace of Prague: 15 June 1635
  - Personal union with Poland–Lithuania: 1697–1706 & 1709–63
  - Raised to kingdom: 20 December 1806
Preceded by
| Duchy of Saxe-Wittenberg |
| Margravate of Meissen |
| Duchy of Thuringia |
Succeeded by
| Kingdom of Saxony |
| Duchy of Saxony (1547–1572) |
- Today part of: Germany; Poland

The Electorate of Saxony (Note: Also known as Electoral Saxony (German: Kurfürstentum Sachsen or Kursachsen) was an Electorate of the Holy Roman Empire. Centred on the Duchy of Saxe-Wittenberg with its capital at Dresden, Saxony was one of the most significant states within the empire. Formally known as the Prince-Elector of Saxony, its rulers came first from the House of Ascania from 1356 to 1422, then the House of Wettin until 1806, when it was replaced by the Kingdom of Saxony.

== Establishment of the Saxon Electorate ==
From the end of the 12th, a narrow circle of imperial electors emerged among highest princes, both secular and ecclesiastical, thus gradually excluding other, less powerful nobles from the electoral process. The dukes of Saxony had prominent roles in various imperial elections, and their electoral rights were affirmed both through practice and formal documents. Already before the Golden Bull of 1356, the Electoral College was reduced in practice to seven major princes: the archbishops of Mainz, Trier and Cologne, plus the king of Bohemia, the count palatine of the Rhine, the duke of Saxony, and the margrave of Brandenburg. Tying electoral rights to specific domains took place already in the early 13th century, and solidified from then on. In the case of the Saxon Electorate, the specific territory tied to was the Ascanian Duchy of Saxony, that emerged in 1180.

== Ascanian Electorate of Saxony ==
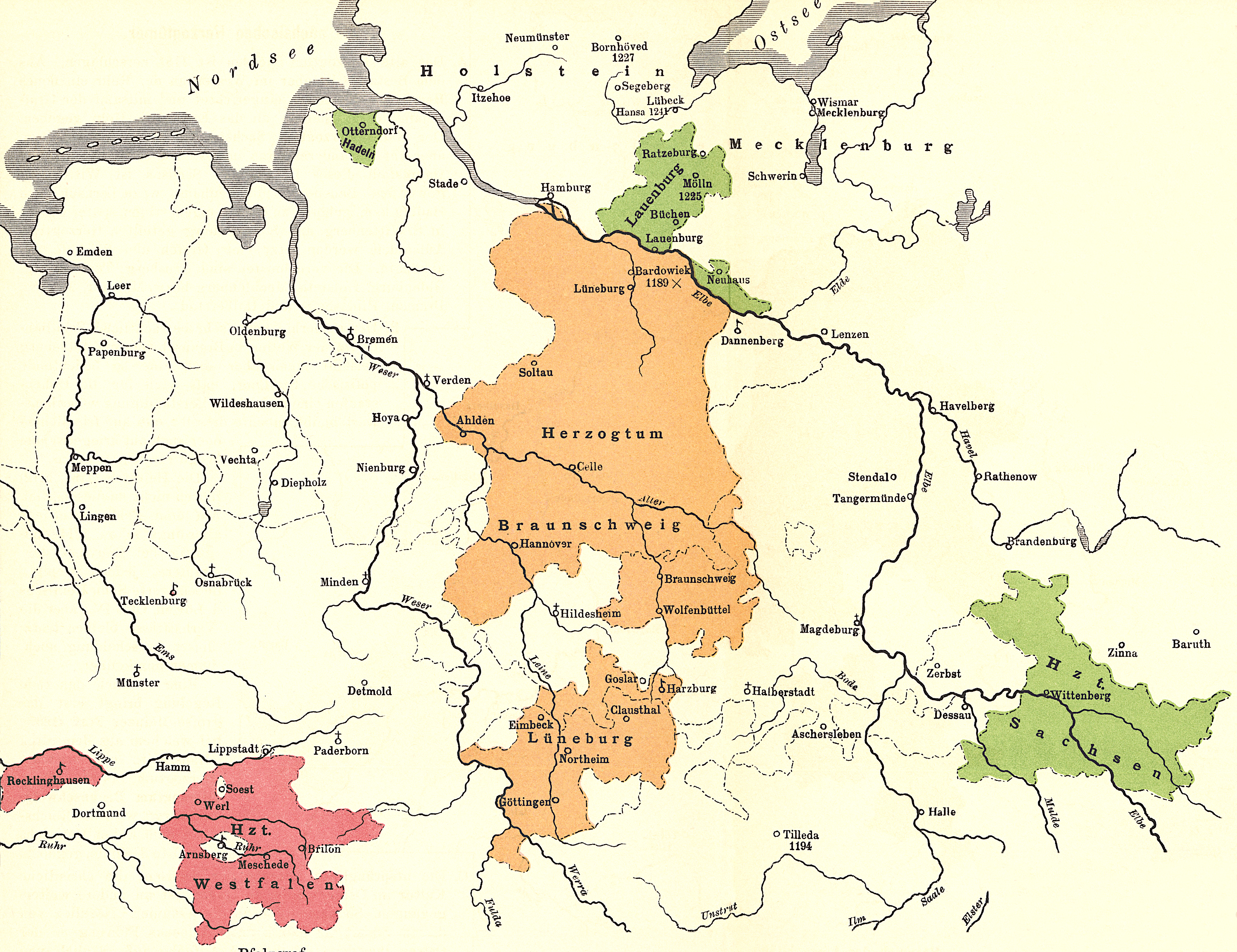
Duchies in Saxon lands (1235): the Ascanian Duchy of Saxony (green), the Welf Duchy of Brunswick-Lüneburg, and the ecclessiastical Duchy of Westphalia

The old Stem Duchy of Saxony of the Early Middle Ages corresponded roughly to the present German State of Lower Saxony. In 1180, the Emperor Frederick Barbarossa deprived the Saxon duke Henry the Lion from the House of Welf of his ducal titles and domains, while also dividing the vast Saxon duchy. The western parts were placed under the Archbishop of Cologne, while the eastern parts were awarded to the House of Ascania, together with the ducal dignity. Thus, the Ascanian count Bernhard III became the new Saxon duke, but his jurisdiction was limited to the eastern regions of the old Stem Duchy of Saxony. Since Bernhard's feudal domains were situated on Saxon eastern frontiers, along the Elbe river, his Duchy of Saxony came to be associated with Ascanian possessions both in eastern Saxony (Eastphalia) and in trans-Elbian regions, around Lauenburg and Wittenberg.

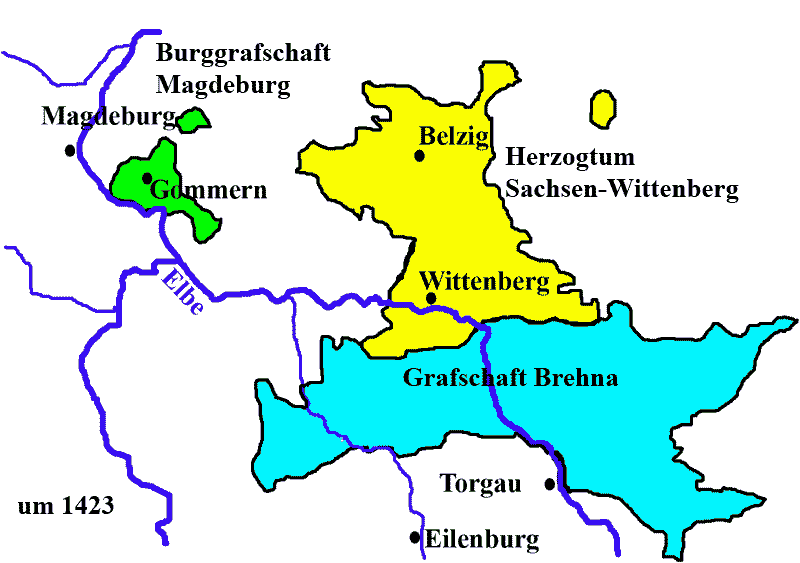
The Ascanian Electorate of Saxony: the Duchy of Saxe-Wittenberg (yellow), with the County of Brehna (blue) and the County of Gommern (green)

Duke Bernhard (d 1212) was succeeded by his younger son Albert I (r. 1212–1260), who inherited the Saxon ducal title and trans-Elbian possessions around Wittenberg and Lauenburg, while Bernhard's older son Henry I inherited all Eastphalian and some trans-Elbian possessions, that became the Principality of Anhalt (1218). Thus, the Saxon ducal domains were reduced to possessions of Albert I around Lauenburg and Wittenberg. After his death in 1260, his sons John I and Albert II (r. 1260–1298) initially ruled together, but in practice started to divide territorial jurisdictions already since 1269, without formal separation. The final division was formalised in 1296, between John's sons and their uncle Albert II, thus creating two distinctive Saxon duchies, the Duchy of Saxe-Lauenburg and the Duchy of Saxe-Wittenberg. Since both were claiming the Saxon electoral dignity, a long dipute emerged between two ducal brances, and lasted until 1356.

The Ascanians of Saxe-Wittenberg, Albert II and Rudolf I (r. 1298–1356) acquired the Burgraviate of Magdeburg and the County of Brehna, and succeeded in asserting themselves as holders to the Saxon electoral privilege, that was not institutionally regulated until 1356 and the Golden Bull, the fundamental law of the Holy Roman Empire that established the procedure for electing the German king by seven prince-electors. Through it Emperor Charles IV permanently granted the electoral privilege to the Duke of Saxony, being the Duke Rudolf I of Saxe-Wittenberg, and decreed the indivisibility of the Saxon ducal territory. The dukes of Saxe-Wittenberg thus rose to a place among the highest-ranking princes of the Empire. In addition to being one of the seven German electorates, Saxe-Wittenberg had possession of the office of arch-marshal of the Holy Roman Empire.

In terms of size, Saxe-Wittenberg remained a rather insignificant territory in the Empire with an area of only about 4,500 to 5,000 square kilometres. There were no large urban centres, but its location along the middle Elbe gave the duchy strategic importance.

== Wettin Electorate of Saxony ==
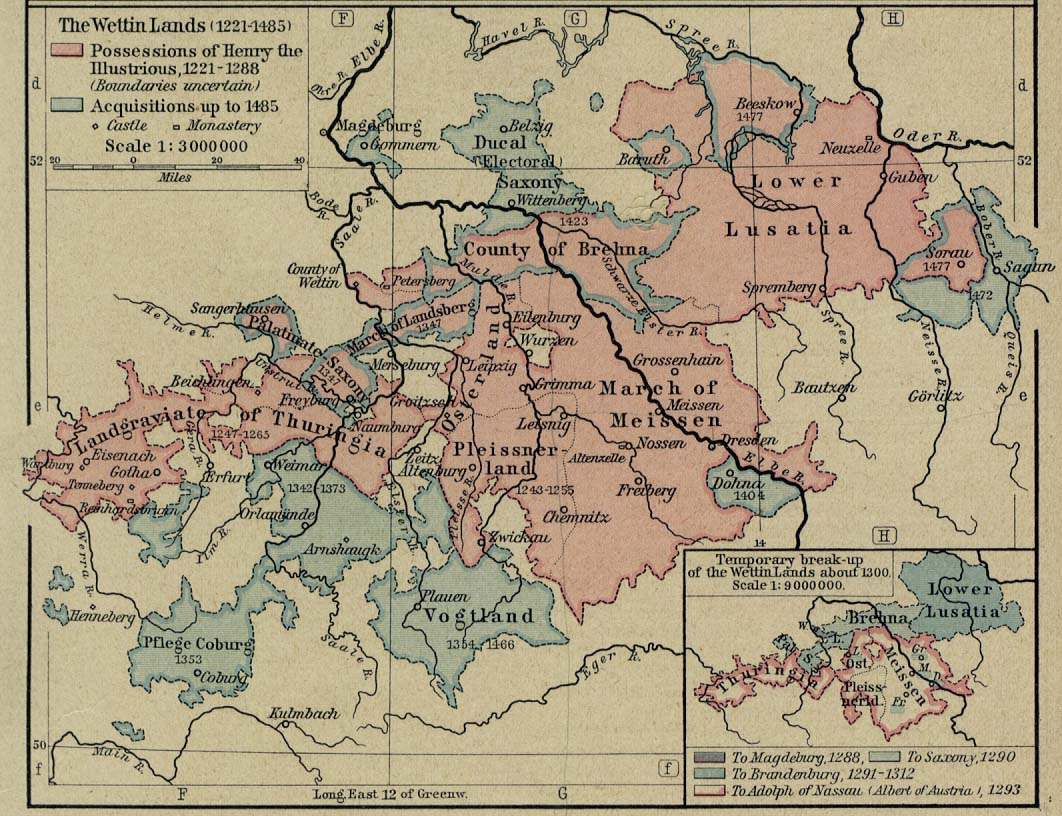
The Electorate of Saxony and other Wettin domains (1423–1485)

In 1422, Elector and Duke Albert III of Saxe-Wittenberg, died without direct male heirs, thus ending the Ascanian-Wittenberg line. His closest male cousin, from the Ascanian-Lauenburg line, was Duke Eric V of Saxe-Lauenburg, who claimed the inheritance. In spite of that, the King Sigismund confiscated the duchy as a vacant imperial fiefdom. In the same time, a major ally of Sigismund, margrave Frederick I of Meissen from the House of Wettin, also claimed the Saxon inheritance. Since Frederick I's support for Sigismund's efforts during the religious Hussite Wars of 1419–1434 was of great importance to the king, he awarded the Saxon inheritance to the Wettin claimant, granting both the Duchy of Saxe-Wittenberg and the Saxon electoral dignity to Frederick I in 1423.

The Wettins, who had been margraves of the March of Lusatia since 1089 and of Meissen since 1125, gained a strategically important area to the north of their territories with Saxe-Wittenberg. It gave them a transportation connection to important northern German cities such as Magdeburg and a stronger integration into the middle Elbe country which was densely populated and important economically. Access to the Elbe made it possible for them to participate in trade with the Hanseatic League, which included several cities along the river. The former colonised land between the Saale and Elbe was connected to the long-settled land in the west through its political upgrade, which occurred at almost the same time that the Hohenzollerns were granted the Electorate of Brandenburg. The Wettins rose to become the leading power in central Germany. Politically, they proved to be committed administrators of the Empire and built up a compact territory, especially through purchases in the 15th century. From the area around Wittenberg the name "Saxony" gradually spread to encompass all the Wettin territories on the upper Elbe.

=== The Saxon Electorate and other Wettin domains ===
Since the ruler's place of residence and his visibility to the people gained in importance in the early phase of the Renaissance, the Wettins created a new seat in the Dresden valley of the Elbe towards the end of the 15th century. Dresden became the permanent residence of the elector, his councilors and administrative officials.

The elector's increased expenses for equipping and maintaining an army and for his own court could no longer be met as before. The solution was to levy new types of taxes, which required the consent of the estates of the realm. The meeting of the estates that Elector Frederick II (r. 1428–1464) organised in 1438 is considered to be the first state parliament (Landtag) in Saxony. The estates were given the right to meet without being summoned by the ruler when there were reforms in taxation. As a result, state parliaments were held more and more frequently, and the Wettin "state of the estates" (Ständestaat) that lasted until the 19th century was formed.

As was common in other German houses, the Wettins regularly divided their possessions among sons and brothers, which often led to intra-family tensions. After the death in 1440 of Frederick IV, Landgrave of Thuringia, the Landgraviate of Thuringia reverted to the Electorate. Disagreements between the landgrave's nephews Elector Frederick II and William III led to the Division of Altenburg of 1445, in which William III received the Thuringian and Franconian parts and Frederick the eastern part of the Electorate.

Disputes over the division led to the Saxon Fratricidal War. After five years of fighting, the situation remained unchanged, although large areas of the country had been devastated. The war was ended with the Peace of Pforta on 27 January 1451. The treaty confirmed the Altenburg partition, temporarily dividing the Wettin domain into an eastern and a western part. The western part of Saxony, which had been ruled by a collateral line of the Wettins since 1382, reverted to the main Wettin line after the death in 1482 of its last representative, Duke William III of Saxony. The unity of the country was then restored.

Of great importance for the development of the country was the agreement reached in 1459 between Elector Frederick II and George of Poděbrady, King of Bohemia, in the Treaty of Eger. It brought about a hereditary settlement and a clear demarcation of the borders between the Kingdom of Bohemia and Saxony.

=== Joint rule of Ernest and Albert ===
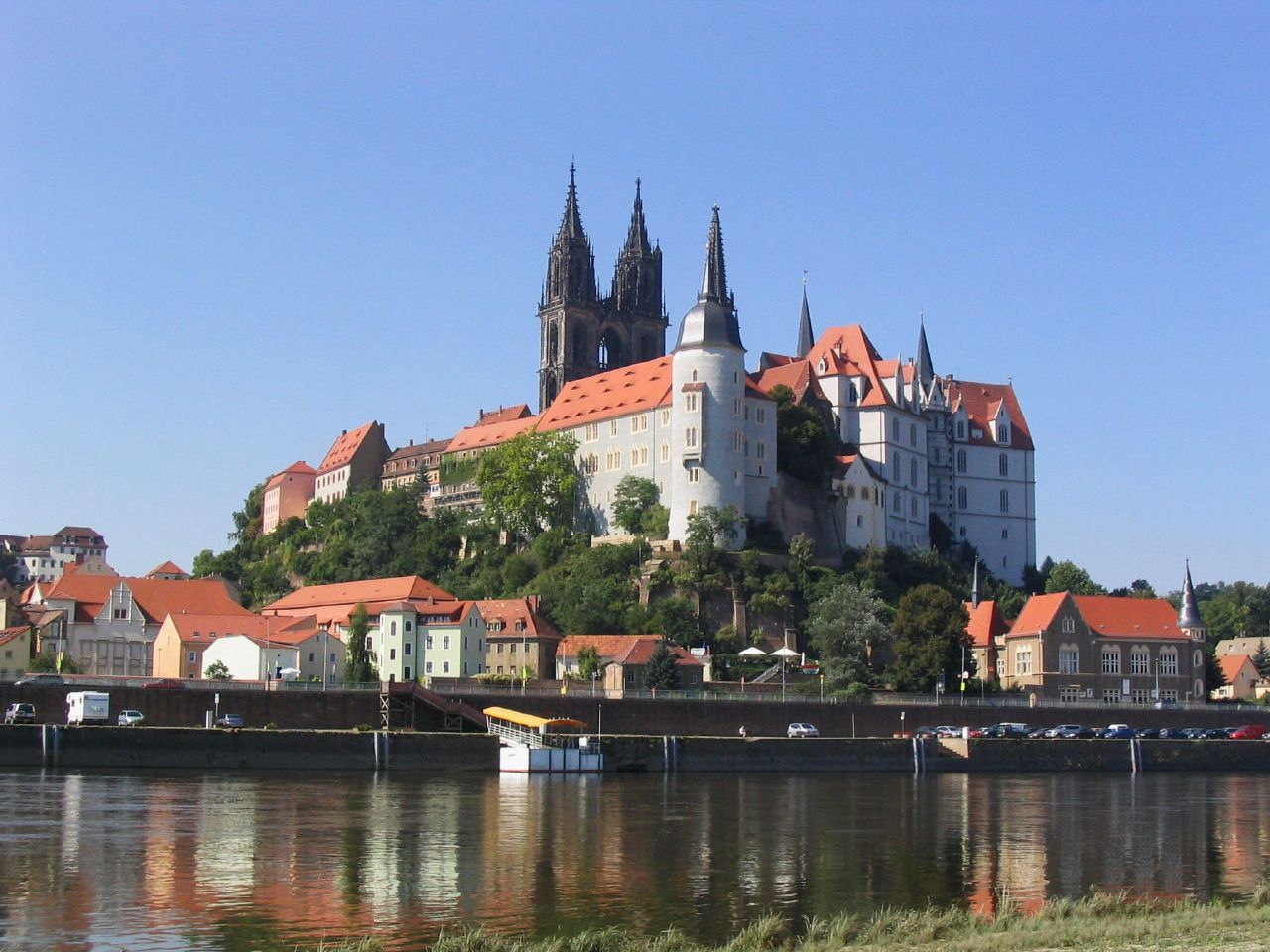
The Albrechtsburg Castle, with the spires of the Meissen Cathedral visible behind it.

When Elector Frederick II died in Leipzig on 7 September 1464, his eldest son Ernest (r. 1464–1486) succeeded him at the age of 23. It marked the beginning of an almost twenty-year period of joint rule with his brother Duke Albert. Initially the two ruled in harmony, favoured by the onset of a long economic upswing and increasing urban development. Agreement on political actions and decisions was ensured by a joint court in Dresden Castle. Together the brothers had the Albrechtsburg Castle built in Meissen on the French model. In their policy, they pursued additional accommodation with Bohemia and provided active military assistance to the Empire against the Ottoman Empire and in the War of the Burgundian Succession.

The period of the joint reign of Ernest and Albert saw extensive silver discoveries in the Ore Mountains that stimulated a sustained economic boom. The mining dividends enabled the Saxon princes to pursue a broad domestic and foreign policy agenda. They purchased lands within the Wettin dominion and expanded their territory to the north and east.

Leipzig became an important economic centre of the Holy Roman Empire after the emperor granted it the right to hold fairs three times a year. At the imperial fairs the electors were able to convert their silver into cash, and with their filled coffers they started an active building program. Due to Leipzig's newly granted market and staple rights, traffic increased on the major trade routes that met in the city, and Leipzig became an important trading centre for the whole of Europe. The customs revenues along the route in turn benefited the electoral treasury. In 1480 the printer Konrad Kachelofen from Nuremberg settled in Leipzig and with his letterpress began the Leipzig tradition of book printing.

In 1483 Elector Ernest and Duke Albert established the Leipzig High Court. It was staffed by nobles and burghers and was the first independent public authority in Electoral Saxony that was detached from the prince and court. An effective local and central administration secured the rule of the electors. Internal order was restored after the unrest and insecurity that robber barons had caused in Germany. Blood feuds were eliminated, the roads were secured from robbery, and an efficient legal system was established. Saxony became culturally, economically, and governmentally advanced compared to the other German states of the time.

After the western part of Saxony reverted to the main Wettin line following the death Duke William III in 1482, Saxony became the second power in the Holy Roman Empire next to the Habsburg domains. The family network of the Wettins expanded to include members who were ecclesiastical dignitaries in Magdeburg, Halberstadt and Mainz, with additional claims to duchies on the lower Rhine.

== Ernestine Electorate of Saxony ==
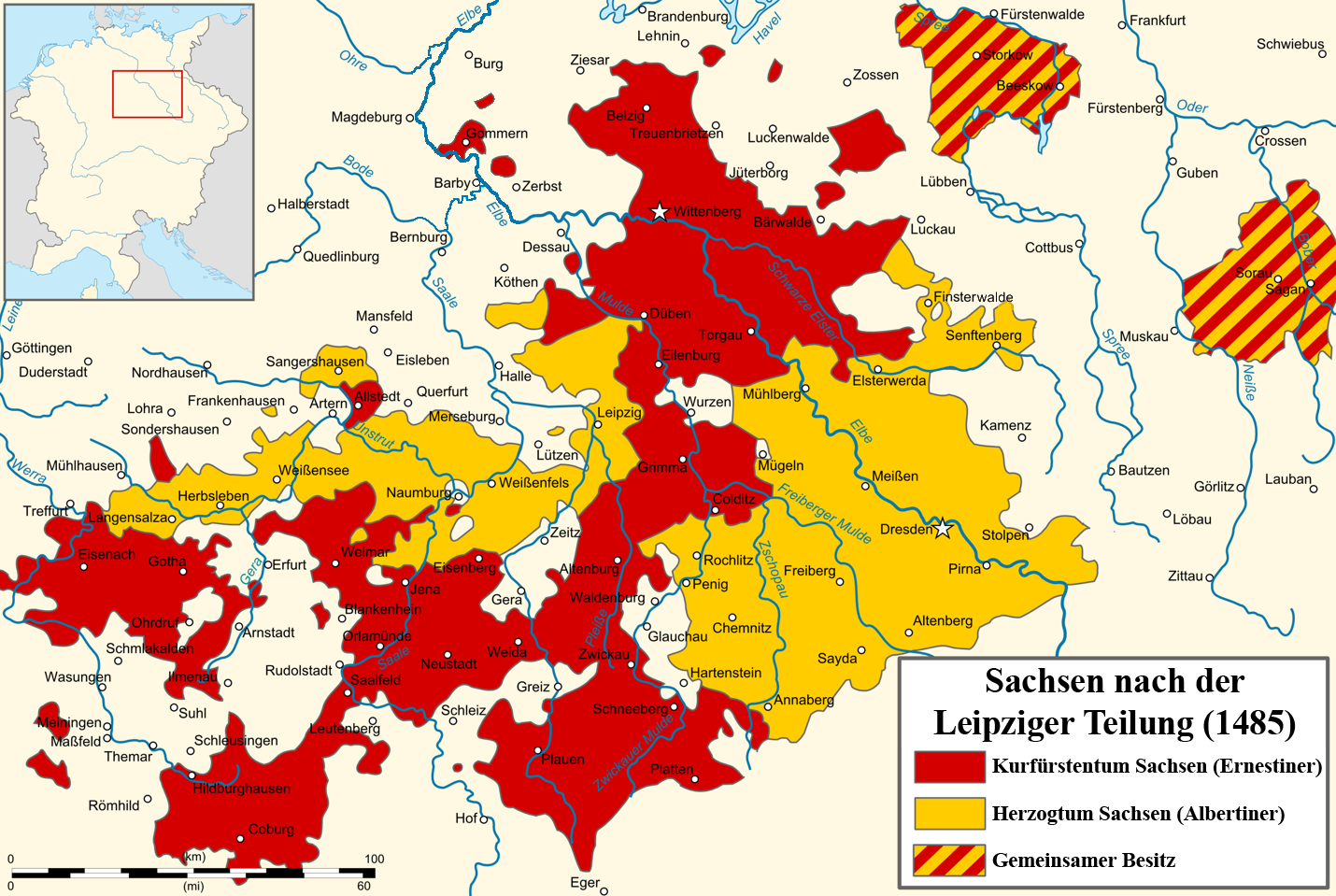
Saxony after the Partition of Leipzig. The Electorate is red, the Duchy yellow, and shared territory is striped.

Tensions that had their origins in family relations increased between the two brothers Ernest and Albert and culminated in the Partition of Leipzig of 11 November 1485. It was not originally intended to be permanent, but in the end it significantly weakened the powerful position of the Electorate of Saxony in the Holy Roman Empire and led to open confrontation.

Ernest had his main focus in the north with his residence at Torgau and held the prestigious electoral district in the north. His territory consisted of 14 exclaves in addition to the main complex. The Ernestines retained the title of elector, which could be transferred to all male members of the family. Albert resided in Dresden as Duke of Saxony and was dominant in the east. He had the strategically better territory because it consisted of only two main areas and four exclaves. The two largest Saxon cities, Leipzig and Dresden, were located in his dominions.

It was within the Ernestine Electorate of Saxony that the major religious movement that transformed the Western Christianity initially occurred. When Martin Luther posted his 95 theses in Wittenberg in 1517, the electoral district and Ernestine possessions of Saxony became the focus of European attention since it was there that the first phase of the Protestant Reformation was anchored. Elector Frederick the Wise (r. 1486–1525) protected Luther, most notably when he sheltered him at the Wartburg castle for ten months in 1521/22 after Luther had refused to recant at the Diet of Worms, but the Albertine duke George the Bearded fought against his ideas and rejected open action against the emperor. It was only after George's death that the Reformation was introduced in the Albertine part of the country. For their part, the Ernestines became involved in the Reformation throughout the Empire, forming with the Schmalkaldic League of Lutheran princes a counterweight to the imperial Catholic side and openly calling for it to be challenged. The religious differences led to the Schmalkaldic War of 1546/47, which was won by the Catholics.

The events of the Peasants' War of 1525 touched Saxon territories only marginally in the Vogtland and the Ore Mountains. The pressure on the peasantry was less in Saxony than in the southwestern areas of the Empire because of Saxony's strong sovereign position and administration which imposed barriers to arbitrary actions by the estate-owning nobility. In 1565, the Jews of Saxony were expelled.

== Albertine Electorate of Saxony ==
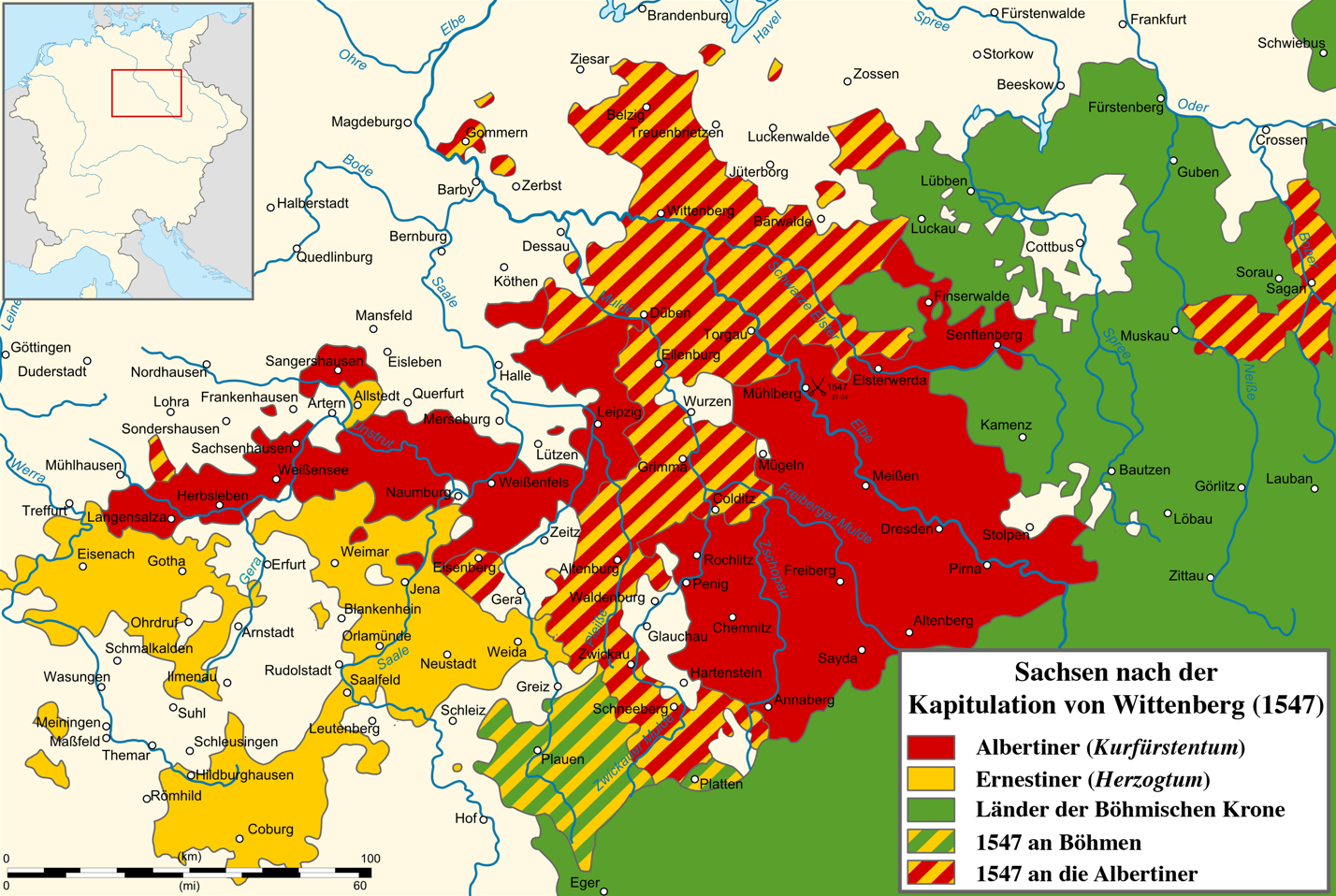
Saxony after the 1547 Capitulation of Wittenberg. Here red is the Electorate and yellow the Duchy.

In the Battle of Mühlberg in the Schmalkaldic War, the Albertine duke Maurice of Saxony, an ally of Emperor Charles V, defeated the Ernestine elector John Frederick I (r. 1532–1547). In the Capitulation of Wittenberg, Maurice (r. 1547–1553) was enfeoffed with the electoral privilege in 1547 and with the Duchy of Saxe-Wittenberg in 1548, but contrary to the emperor's promises, he did not receive all of the Ernestine territories.

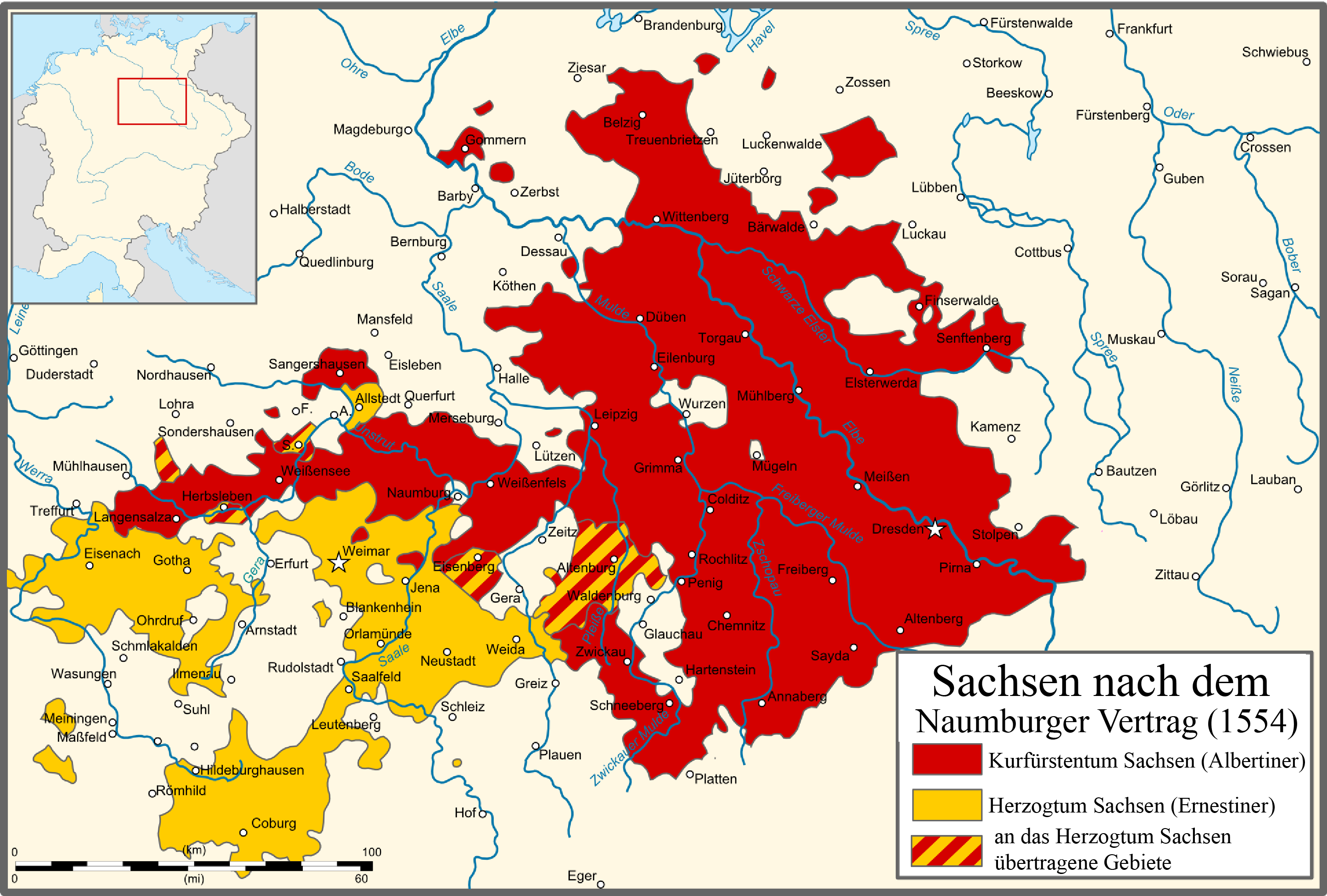
Later redistribution of Wettin lands upon the Treaty of Naumburg (1554): electorate (red) and duchy (yellow)

The Ernestine line lost half of its possessions and retained only Weimar, Jena, Saalfeld, Weida, Gotha, Eisenach and Coburg. The fragmentation of the Ernestine possessions into numerous small states began in 1572. Two main Ernestine lines emerged in 1640, the House of Saxe-Weimar and the House of Saxe-Gotha. While the former had only a few collateral lines which were eventually united to form Saxe-Weimar-Eisenach, the House of Saxe-Gotha counted a great many collateral lines, most of which ruled over their own lands.

It was the Albertine territories that for the most part made up what is now Saxony. Once again it became the second most important German state in the Holy Roman Empire after the Habsburg states, with the ability to play a decisive role in imperial politics. The state along the middle course of the Elbe that Electoral Saxony formed was not, however, fully connected geographically. Elector Maurice and his successor, his brother Augustus (r. 1553–1586), worked to fill in the gaps. On 13 July 1547 the estates of the realm from the old and new territories were convened in Leipzig for two weeks as state parliament.

Elector Maurice succeeded in clearing the way for the recognition of the new faith in the Empire. Under his rule, the Electorate of Saxony more than any other power in the Empire protected the Protestant faith. After the conclusion of the 1555 Peace of Augsburg that allowed rulers within the Empire to choose either Lutheranism or Catholicism, Saxony was firmly on the Habsburg side. Augustus, who had replaced Maurice as elector after he was killed in battle in 1553, saw himself as the leader of the Lutheran imperial states in whose interest the status quo achieved between Protestants and Catholics was to be preserved.

The Ernestine duke John Frederick II continued to claim the electoral privilege that had been revoked from his father. When his ally Wilhelm von Grumbach was placed under an imperial ban, John Frederick refused to act against him, and he too was put under ban a year later. Emperor Ferdinand I entrusted Augustus with the execution of the imperial sentences, and his successful military actions against both Grumbach and John Frederick in 1567 consolidated Electoral Saxony's position in the Empire. The Albertine electoral privilege was never again challenged by the Ernestines.

=== Reformed Protestantism ===
The introduction of Calvinism into Electoral Saxony began under Elector Christian I (r. 1586–1591). In time it prevailed over the orthodox Lutheran party, and the new church order was enforced nationwide. With Christian's death in 1591, the situation changed abruptly. Under a guardianship government established for the underaged Christian II (r. 1591–1611), Calvinist movements in Saxony were opposed with violence. Calvinist supporters were removed from all offices, and in the Leipzig Calvinist storm the houses of wealthy Calvinists were stormed and set on fire.

The growing differences between reformed and orthodox Lutheranism strengthened the influence of the Catholic Counter-Reformation, which was supported by the emperor. Electoral Saxony tried to mediate between the parties in the Empire. In 1608 the Protestant Union was founded as an alliance of the Protestant imperial estates, followed in 1609 by the union of the Catholic imperial estates into the Catholic League.

=== Thirty Years' War ===
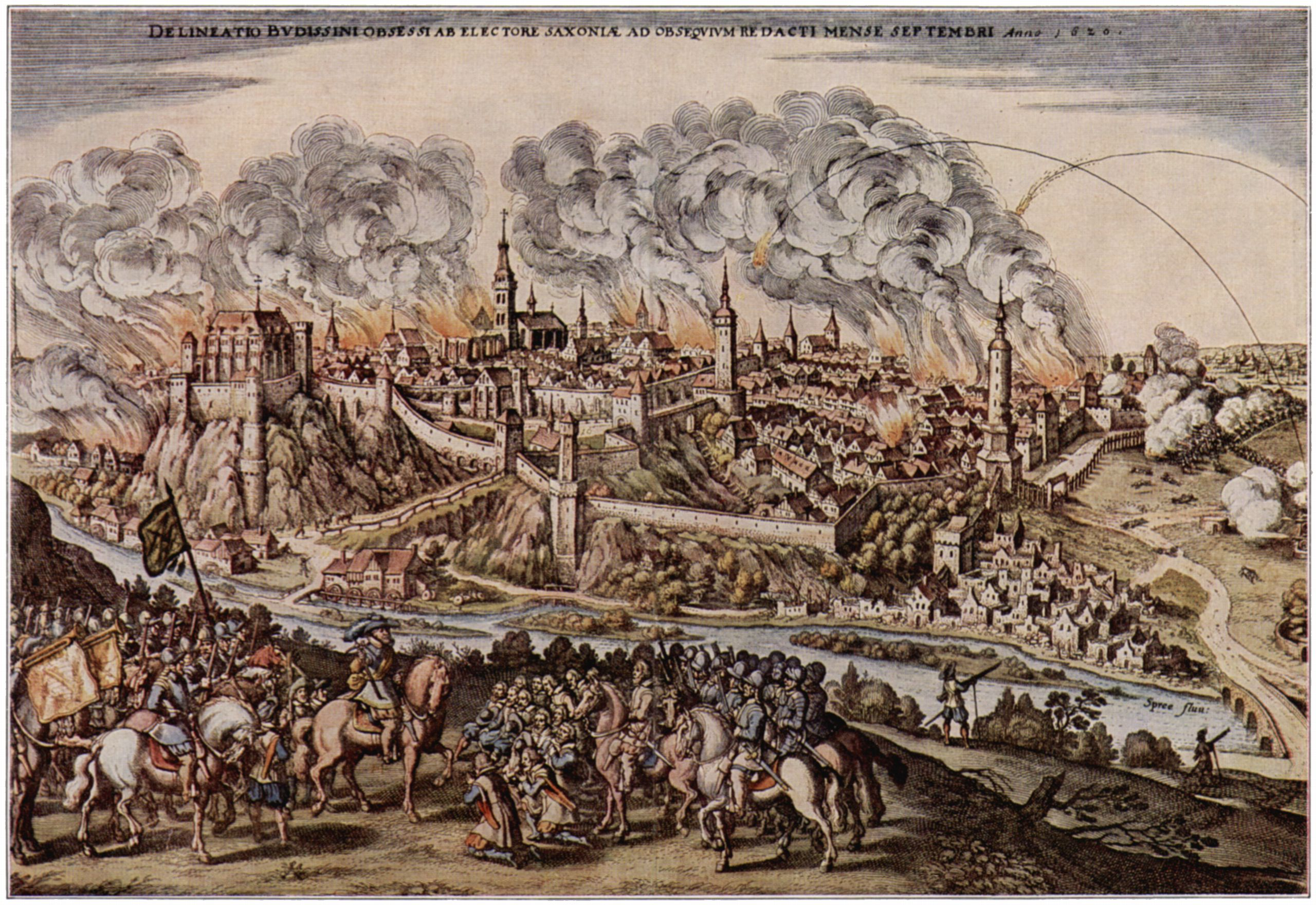
The siege and capture of Bautzen by John George I, Elector of Saxony, in September 1620

The 1618 Defenestration of Prague, in which angry Protestants threw Catholic officials out of a window of Prague Castle, marked the end of a long period of religious peace. Elector John George I (r. 1611–1656) joined the emperor's side with the goal of preserving the status quo of the 1555 Peace of Augsburg. Initially he and the elector of Mainz tried to mediate between Emperor Matthias and the Bohemian estates that were behind the defenestration. After the death of the emperor in March 1619, the Bohemian estates deposed the newly crowned Ferdinand II and elected Frederick V of the Palatinate as their king. John George then agreed with Ferdinand II that Saxony should reconquer the two Bohemian tributary lands of Upper and Lower Lusatia for the emperor. In September 1620 Saxon troops marched into the two Lusatian territories and occupied them without major resistance. Because the emperor could not as agreed reimburse John George for the war costs, he had to give him the two Lusatias as a pledge in 1623.

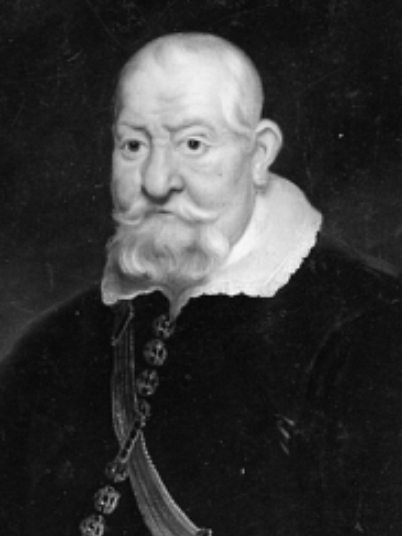
Elector John George I, who led Saxony during the Thirty Years' War

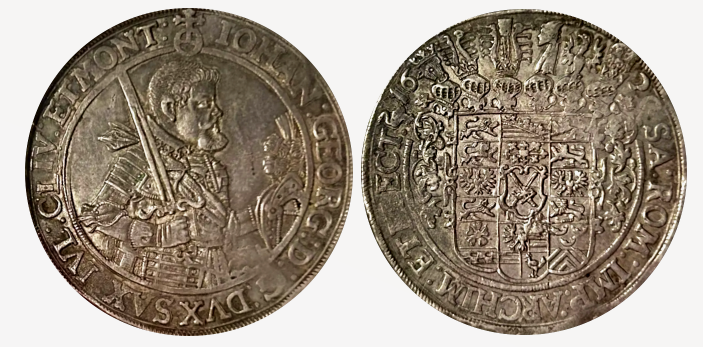
1620 Thaler of John George I

Saxony's relations with the emperor then began to deteriorate, in part because Saxony's neutrality was only minimally respected by the imperial troops led by Albrecht von Wallenstein, who on several occasions led marauding troops into Lusatia. John George also disliked the ruthlessly pursued recatholicisation in Silesia and Bohemia, although he was unable to do anything about it. In 1631 he finally felt compelled to enter the war against the emperor on the side of Protestant Sweden. The decisive factor for the radical change in policy was the military situation – Swedish troops were already on Saxon soil at the time.

The war affected Electoral Saxony especially badly in the west. The Battle of Breitenfeld took place near Leipzig in 1631, as did the Battle of Lützen the following year; both were won by the Protestant side. Leipzig was besieged several times, and its population declined from 17,000 to 14,000. Chemnitz was severely damaged and Freiberg lost its earlier importance. Other urban centres, notably Dresden/Meissen, were spared. Many smaller towns and villages fell victim to massive looting, especially after General Wallenstein gave free hand to his field marshal Heinrich Holk. From August to December 1632 the Croatian light cavalry raided numerous villages, plundering them, maltreating and killing the inhabitants and leaving a swath of destruction in its wake.

In 1635 Saxony concluded the Peace of Prague with the emperor and in an appendix to the treaty the next year gained possession of Lusatia. Saxony's territory increased by about 13,000 square kilometres and almost reached its final borders. The devastation caused by the Thirty Years' War nevertheless continued, as battles against the Swedes went on for more than ten years. Electoral Saxony left the direct fighting provisionally with the armistice of 1645 and permanently through a 1646 treaty with Sweden.

After the conclusion on 23 October 1648 of the Peace of Westphalia that ended the Thirty Years' War, Swedish troops were slow in leaving Electoral Saxony. Only after payment of a stipulated tribute of 276,600 imperial thalers on 30 June 1650 did the last of the Swedes leave Leipzig. Life increasingly returned to normal after the hired mercenaries were also released.

Most of the decrease in Saxony's population due to the war came about indirectly through epidemics and economic factors related to the stagnation of trade, but troop movements and wartime occupations also caused considerable loss in both urban and village populations. According to the historian Karlheinz Blaschke, Saxony's population was reduced by about half as a result of the war. Other authors point out that such a large decrease may have been true in individual regions, but that it cannot be applied to the entire population. The losses were mitigated to a large extent by religious refugees, about 150,000 of whom came to Saxony from Bohemia and Silesia. After the complete devastation of Magdeburg, its importance as a metropolis in the east of the Holy Roman Empire passed to Leipzig and Dresden, as well as to the rising Brandenburg city of Berlin.

When John George II (r. 1656–1680) succeeded his father, Electoral Saxony was still suffering from the economic consequences of the war. It was not until the reign of John George III (r. 1680–1691) that the war damage and dire social welfare situation were overcome. Resettlement of village farms and urban households proved to be the most difficult problem. The first sign of recovery was an increase in tax revenues. Mining, metallurgy, crafts, trade and transportation recovered slowly but steadily. The Saxon estates of the realm had regained influence during the war due to the territorial princes' great need for money. In the second half of the 17th century the electors had to convene the state parliament far more frequently than before, and in 1661 the estates were able to assert their right to self-assembly.

=== Early Baroque ===
John George I took advantage of the peace to put his territories in order. A clause in his will overrode the decree issued by Albert in 1499 which was intended to prevent a division in the inheritance. Small parts of Electoral Saxony were bequeathed to his three sons Augustus, Christian and Maurice. The bequests established independent duchies that created a collateral line of the family. The duchies of Saxe-Zeitz, Saxe-Merseburg, and Saxe-Weissenfels that were created reverted to Electoral Saxony in 1718, 1738, and 1746 respectively. In John George's time, the partitions weakened the electoral state economically, financially and politically, even though from a cultural point of view, new centres with palace buildings, cultural institutions and scientific facilities were established outside Dresden and Leipzig. The collateral lines striving for independence also limited the trend towards absolutist government that was growing in Electoral Saxony.

Like other similarly sized states of the time, Electoral Saxony pursued a foreign policy goal of advancing its own rise in a system of states dominated by rivalries. It remained at the side of the Austrian imperial house until the end of the 17th century. After the death of Emperor Ferdinand III in 1657, John George II was imperial vicar (regent) for more than a year until the election of the Habsburg Leopold I. Saxony took part in the Second Northern War against Sweden (1655–1660) and then the Austro-Turkish War (1663–1664). In the same year it became a member of the League of the Rhine and allowed the French to recruit on Saxon territory and to have its troops pass through it. In 1683 Elector John George III participated in the Battle of Vienna that ended the second Turkish siege of the city and ensured its independence.

=== Absolutism and splendour ===
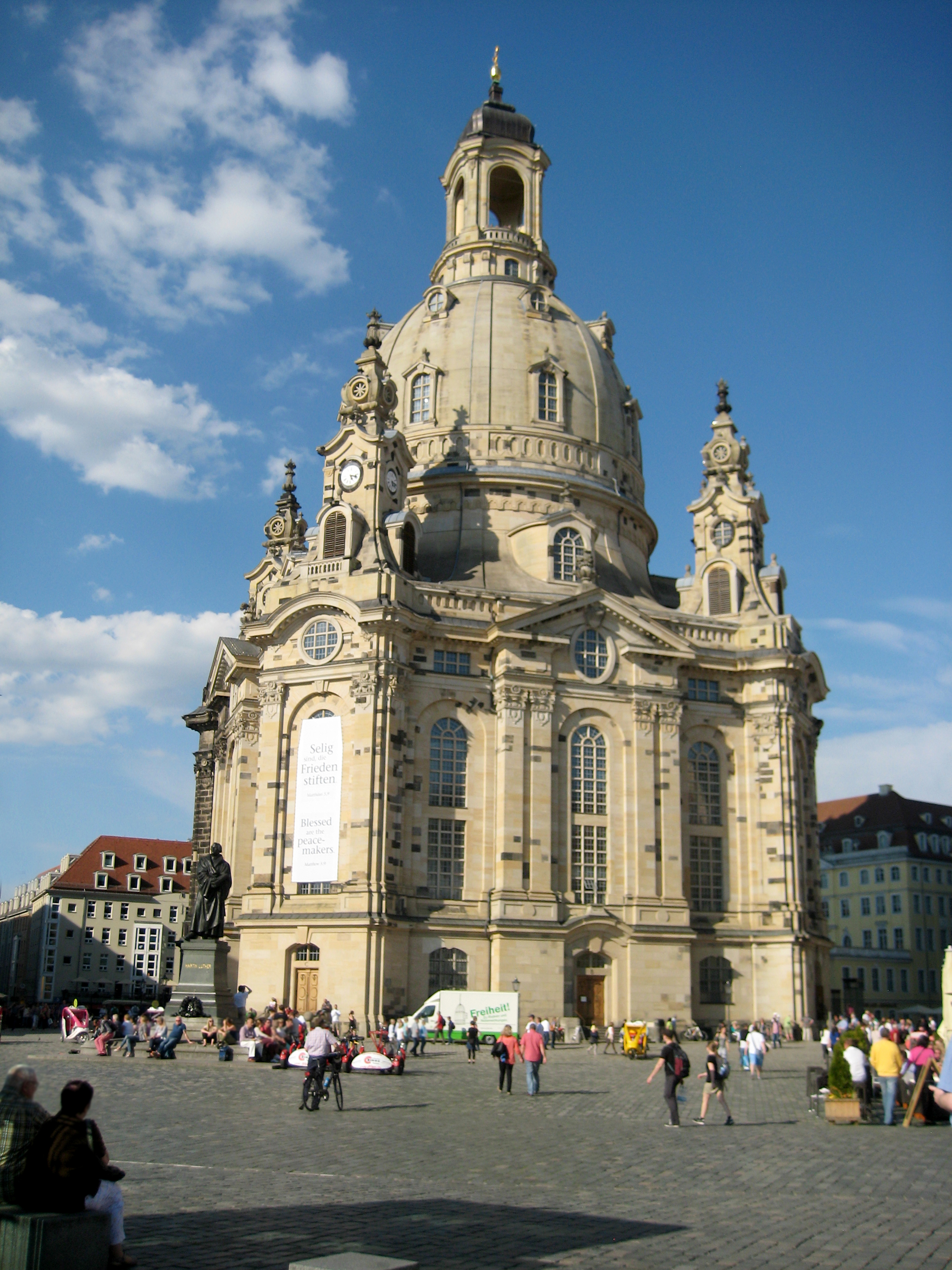
The Frauenkirche in Dresden. It was rebuilt 1994–2005 following its destruction in World War II.

On 27 April 1694 the prince who until then had scarcely made an appearance took over the affairs of state of Saxony as Elector Frederick Augustus I (r. 1694–1733), better known as Augustus II the Strong. Festivities, baroque splendour, art and patronage, as well as lavish grandeur and ostentation characterised both his reign and the period. Augustan Dresden continued to develop into the "Florence on the Elbe". The period saw the building of the Zwinger Palace, the Taschenbergpalais, the Pillnitz Palace, the Moritzburg Castle and the Augustus Bridge. New church buildings included the Protestant Frauenkirche by George Bähr and the Catholic Dresden Cathedral of Gaetano Chiaveri.

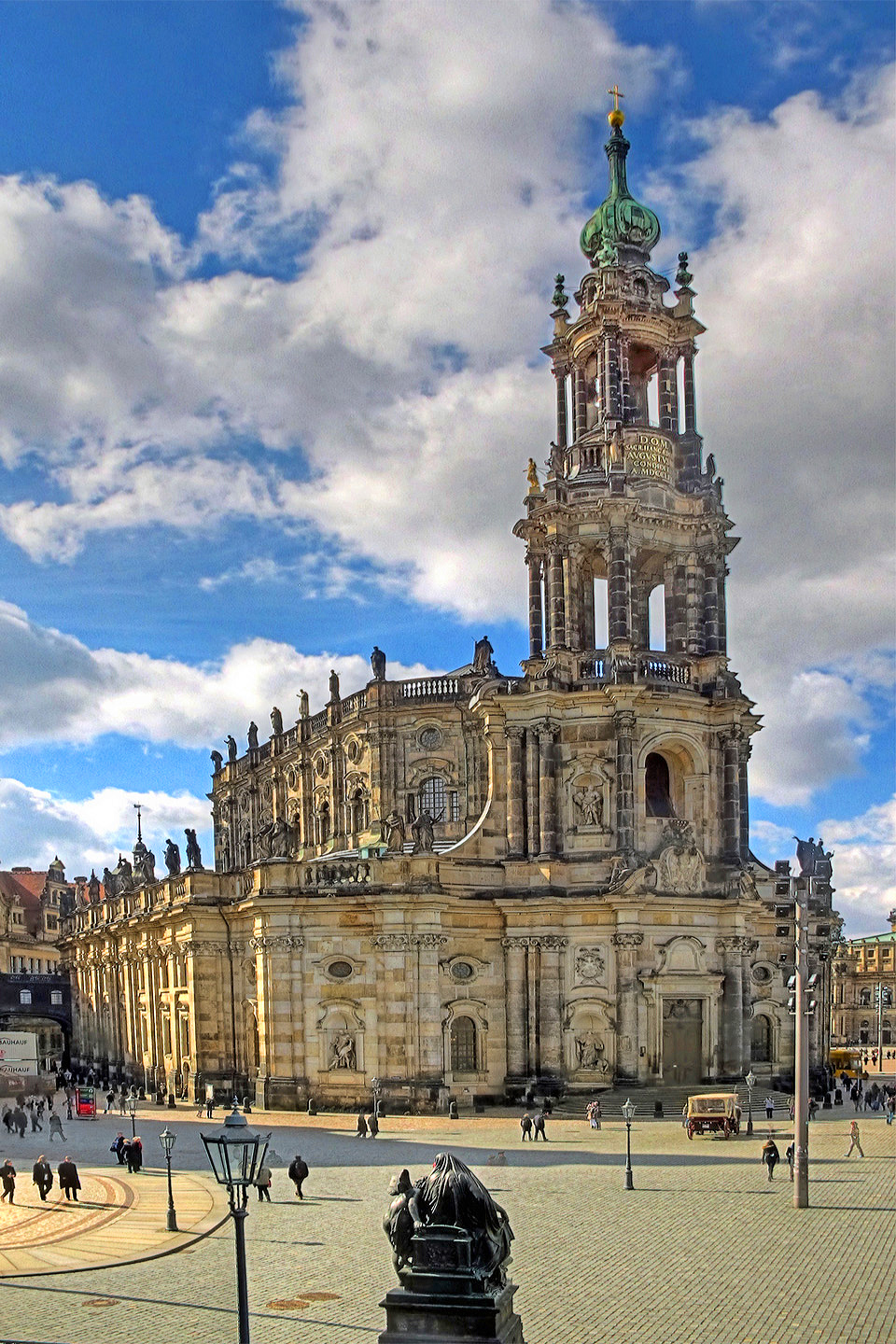
The Dresden Cathedral

The luxurious life at court eventually exceeded the economic capacity of the state and was ultimately financed at the expense of military strength. The financial problems led to the abandonment of important positions in central Germany. Electoral Saxony's overextension favoured the rise of Brandenburg-Prussia to become the second major German and Protestant power in the Empire.

Augustus reduced the influence of the nobility by establishing a centralised body for executive powers with the help of a privy cabinet created in 1706. It had specialised departments and gradually became the supreme central authority over the competing privy council of the territorial princes. Augustus also introduced a transparent accounting system to verify expenditures and a chamber of accounts that effectively organised the tax system. As a result of it and of the military retrenchment, the national debt was limited and manageable in spite of the high expenditures. A true absolutism did not develop in the Electorate. The inherent contradictions between the elector's claim to absolute power, the nobility's will to assert itself, and the aspirations of the burghers proved to be insurmountable.

Because Augustus' son Frederick Augustus II (r. 1733–1763) had no political ambitions, he left the day-to-day political business to his prime minister Heinrich von Brühl. Under Brühl the mismanagement of Saxony's finances increased and budgets became unorganised, resulting in payment defaults and the danger of insolvency.

=== Personal union with Poland ===
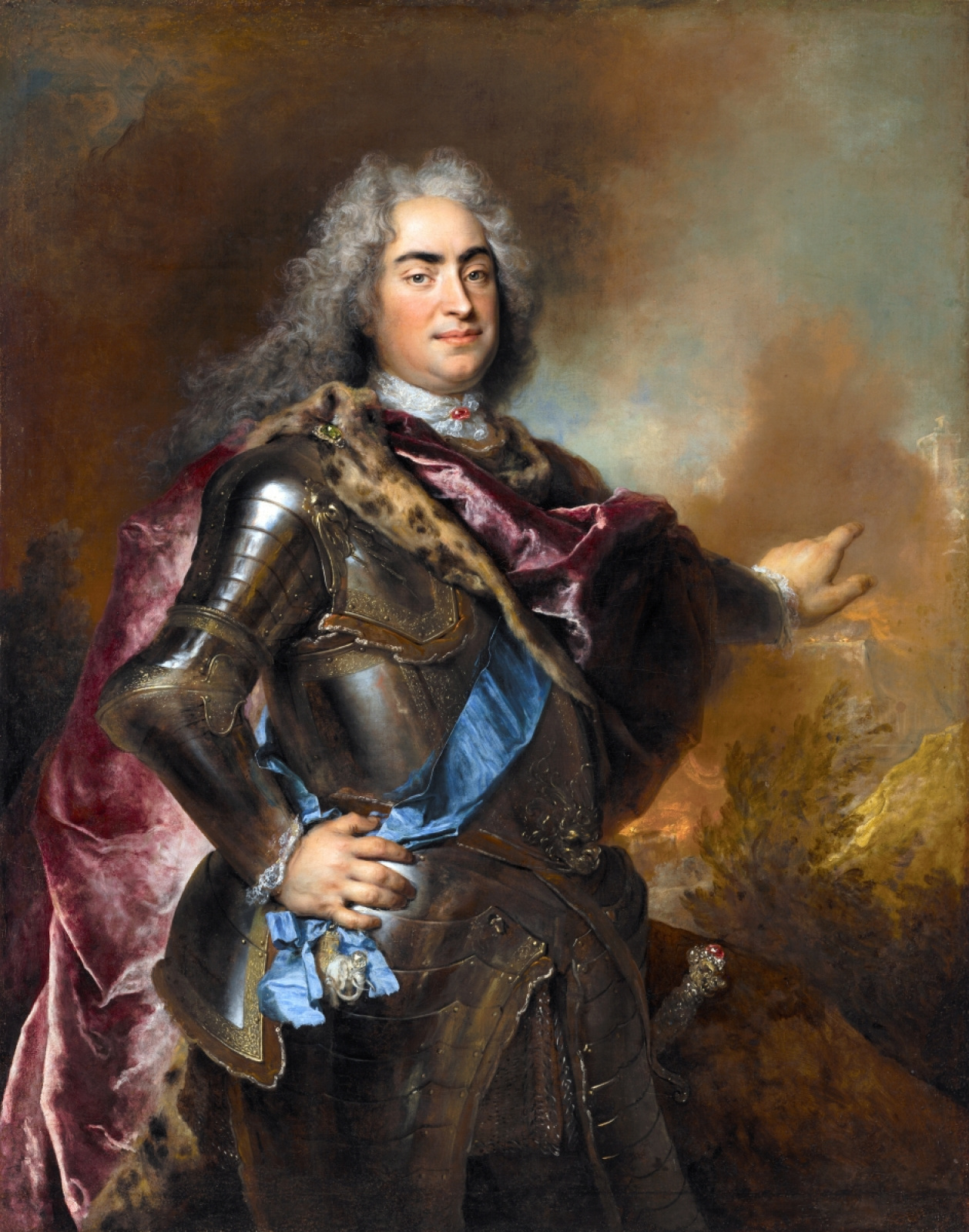
Augustus II the Strong, Elector of Saxony and King of Poland, wearing the Polish Order of the White Eagle

After the death of the Polish king John III Sobieski in 1696, Augustus II the Strong converted to Catholicism and with Habsburg support, military pressure and bribes, won the free election for the kingship in 1697, becoming King Augustus II of Poland and Grand Duke of Lithuania. The political calculation behind a dynastically based personal union with the elective Polish–Lithuanian Commonwealth was rooted in the aspirations for independence among German territorial princes. Saxony's rulers, like the other powerful imperial princes of the time, wanted to escape the central grip of the Holy Roman emperor and raise their own dynastic rank in the European state system.

King Augustus' increased importance in foreign affairs led to secret negotiations with Denmark and Russia that were directed against Sweden and that ultimately resulted in the Great Northern War of 1700–1721. Augustus' power politics failed due to early defeats; the Saxon invasion of Swedish Livonia in 1700 turned into a military fiasco. The Swedes occupied Electoral Saxony in 1706/07 and forced Augustus to temporarily renounce the Polish crown in the Treaty of Altranstädt. The occupation cost Saxony 35 million Reichsthaler. Augustus regained possession of the Polish crown after the Swedes withdrew from Poland in 1709, but he was unable to assert his claim to Swedish Livonia and fell to the rank of a junior partner of Russia.

After Augustus' death in 1733, disputes over his successor resulted in the War of the Polish Succession, which was won by Saxony. The legitimately elected Stanisław Leszczyński was forced to flee, and Elector Frederick Augustus II was elected as Polish King Augustus III.

In 1756, at the beginning of the Seven Years' War, Saxony was invaded by the Kingdom of Prussia and remained under occupation and a part of the theatre of war until 1763. The Prussians debased the Saxon currency, and Augustus III was briefly taken prisoner before being allowed to leave for Poland; he ruled exclusively from Warsaw throughout the war.

After the Treaty of Hubertusburg of 1763 that ended the Third Silesian War (a part of the Seven Years' War), Saxony's position as a European power came to an end. Augustus III and Heinrich von Brühl both died in 1763, and the Saxon-Polish dynastic alliance effectively ended with the Russian-Prussian alliance of 1764. The House of Wettin's official renunciation of the Polish kingship followed in 1765. Elector Frederick Augustus III (r. 1763–1806) rejected a new offer of the royal crown in 1791. Saxony was no longer in a position to play a role among the great powers.

The impact of the Seven Years' War on Saxony was devastating. As a central theatre of battles and troop movements, it suffered significant destruction and many civilian casualties. An estimated 90,000 Saxons died as a result of the fighting. To avoid forced recruitment, many Saxons left the country. Counterfeiting led to economic losses under which the Leipzig Fair and Saxon's credit suffered.

=== Rétablissement and transformation to a kingdom ===
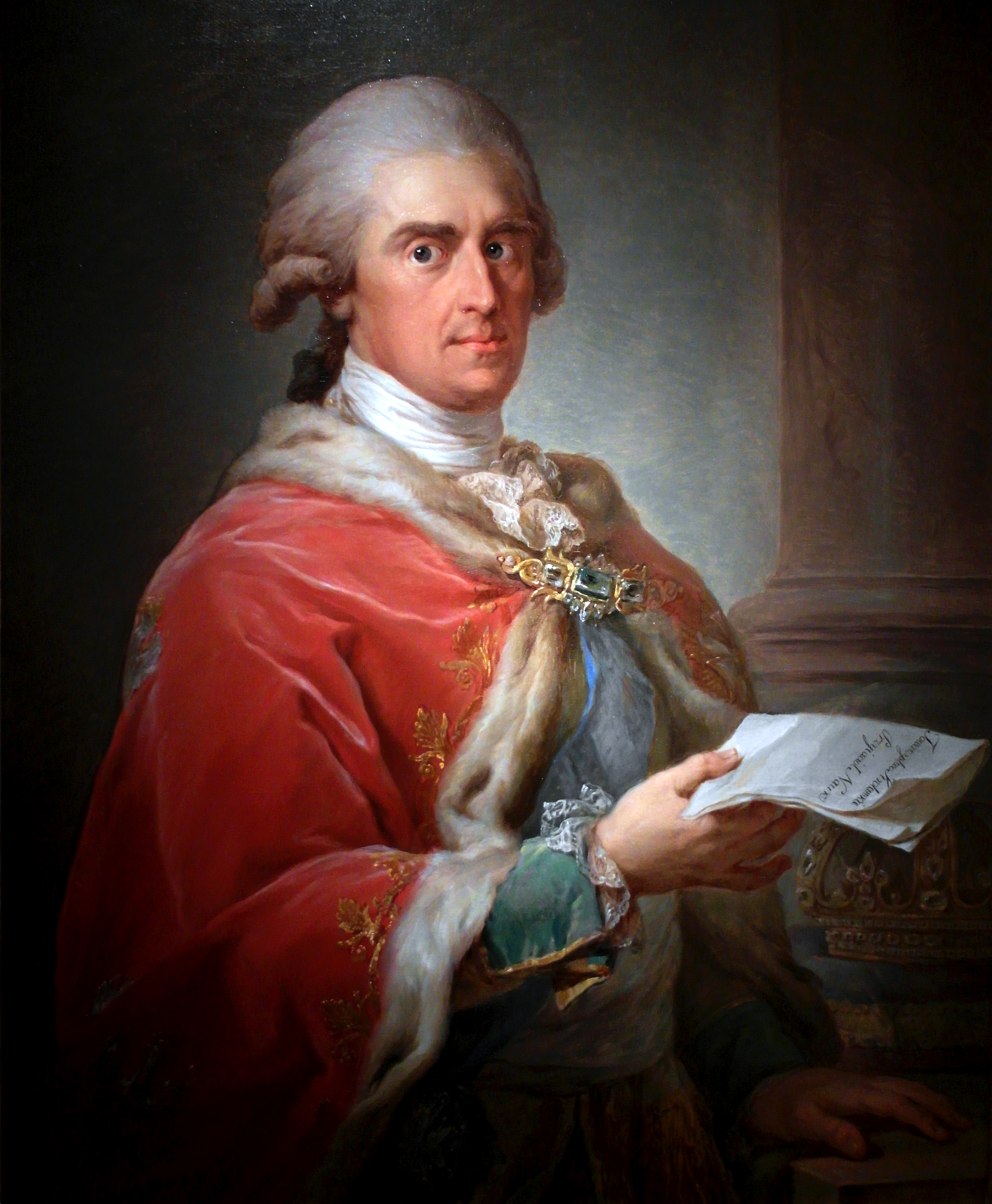
King Frederick Augustus I of Saxony, who as Frederick Augustus III was the last elector of Saxony.

The Electorate stood on the verge of national bankruptcy after the Hubertusburg Peace. The national debt had reached 49 million thalers, about ten times the year's state revenue. Thomas von Fritsch and the restoration commission of which he was president placed the systematic reduction of the national debt at the centre of a Saxon reconstruction program that was called the Rétablissement. Through comprehensive reforms, Saxony not only returned to a budget surplus in 1774 but also achieved at least twenty years of unprecedented economic growth. The Rétablissement went far beyond repairing war damage and became one of the most significant and successful reconstruction efforts in German history.

After taking part in the War of the Bavarian Succession (1778/79), Saxony no longer participated in "haggling over land" (Länderschacher) and merely ended a permanent dispute over the area around Glaucha, which brought the state treasury seven million guilders for further state investment. From 1791 on, Elector Frederick Augustus III entered into shifting coalitions which continued beyond Saxony's elevation to a kingdom in 1806. In 1805 the Electorate of Saxony covered 39,425 square kilometres.

At the outbreak of the War of the Fourth Coalition against Napoleon in 1806, the Electorate of Saxony was allied with Prussia. Saxon soldiers fought against the Napoleonic armies in the Battle of Jena. After their defeat, the Electorate was occupied and 10,000 Bavarian soldiers and a French city commander moved into Dresden. On 11 December 1806 Saxony concluded the Treaty of Poznań with France, which brought it into French dependence. Electoral Saxony was granted some Prussian territories, joined the Confederation of the Rhine, and was obliged to provide troop contingents for the French wars. Elector Frederick Augustus III of Saxony received the title of king, was from that point allowed to call himself King Frederick Augustus I of Saxony, and ruled the Kingdom of Saxony until 1827, after the Holy Roman Empire was dissolved in 1806.

== See also ==
- History of Saxony
- History of Saxony-Anhalt
- History of Lower Saxony

== Bibliography ==
Sources in English:

- Hans-Albrecht Koch. Dresden: Crossroads of Europe. Library of Congress Prof. Koch's Remarks - Dresden: Treasures from the Saxon State Library | Exhibitions - Library of Congress [retrieved 2018.11.27]
- Chancellery of Saxony. Coat of arms of Saxony Information in English language - Coat of Arms Archived 8 March 2021 at the Wayback Machine [retrieved 2018.11.27]
- Caroline Schelling. trans. Doug Scott (2014). "Germany in the Late 18th Century" Supplementary Appendix: Germany in the late 18th Century – Caroline Schelling
- Wilson, Peter H. (2016). Heart of Europe: A History of the Holy Roman Empire. Cambridge: Harvard University Press.

Sources in German:

- Blaschke, Karlheinz (2002). "Die Leipziger Teilung der wettinischen Länder von 1485". Beiträge zur Verfassungs- und Verwaltungsgeschichte Sachsens: Ausgewählte Aufsätze von Karlheinz Blaschke. Leipzig: Leipziger Universitätsverlag. pp. 323–335.
- Groß, Reiner (2007). Die Wettiner. Stuttgart: Kohlhammer Verlag.
- Groß, Reiner (Hrsg.): Landtage in Sachsen 1438–1831. Beiträge auf dem von der Professur Regionalgeschichte Sachsens der Technischen Universität Chemnitz veranstalteten wissenschaftlichen Kolloquium am 25. Februar 2000. Technische Universität Chemnitz, Chemnitz 2000.
- Keller, Katrin: Kleinstädte in Kursachsen. Wandlungen einer Städtelandschaft zwischen Dreißigjährigem Krieg und Industrialisierung. Böhlau, Köln/Weimar/Wien 2001, ISBN 3-412-11300-X.
- Kroll, Frank-Lothar (Hrsg.): Die Herrscher Sachsens. Markgrafen, Kurfürsten, Könige 1089–1918. C.H. Beck, München 2007, ISBN 978-3-406-54773-7.
- Krüger, Nina: Landesherr und Landstände in Kursachsen auf den Ständeversammlungen der zweiten Hälfte des 17. Jahrhunderts. Lang, Frankfurt am Main/Berlin/Bern [u. a.] 2007, ISBN 978-3-631-54598-0.
- Krumwiede, Hans-Walter: Zur Entstehung des landesherrlichen Kirchenregimentes in Kursachsen und Braunschweig-Wolfenbüttel (= Studien zur Kirchengeschichte Niedersachsens. Band 16). Vandenhoeck und Ruprecht, Göttingen 1967.
- Kühne, Heinrich: Die Askanier. Drei Kastanien Verlag, Wittenberg 1999, ISBN 3-933028-14-0.
- Lück, Heiner: Die kursächsische Gerichtsverfassung 1423–1550 (= Forschungen zur deutschen Rechtsgeschichte. Band 17). Böhlau, Köln/Weimar/Wien 1997, ISBN 3-412-12296-3.
- Müller, Frank: Kursachsen und der böhmische Aufstand 1618–1622. Aschendorff, Münster 1997, ISBN 3-402-05674-7.
- Salisch, Marcus: Treue Deserteure: Das kursächsische Militär und der Siebenjährige Krieg (= Militärgeschichtliche Studien. Band 41). Oldenbourg, München 2008, ISBN 3-486-84852-6.
- Schirmer, Uwe: Kursächsische Staatsfinanzen (1456–1656). Strukturen – Verfassung – Funktionseliten (= Quellen und Forschungen zur sächsischen Geschichte. Band 28). Steiner, Stuttgart 2006, ISBN 3-515-08955-1.
- Tebruck, Stefan (2005). "Zwischen Integration und Selbstbehauptung: Thüringen im wettinischen Herrschaftsbereich". Fragen der politischen Integration im mittelalterlichen Europa. Ostfildern: Jan Thorbecke Verlag. pp. 375–412, 589–591..
