= Arthur Golf =

- Born: Richard Arthur Golf; 21 July 1877; Beyersdorf, (Kreis Bitterfeld), Saxony, Germany
- Died: 18 February 1941 (aged 63); Leipzig, Germany
- Education: Breslau; Halle; Bonn
- Occupations: agronomist university dean and professor
- Political party: NSDAP
- Spouse: Margarete Osterland (1888-)
- Children: Ehrhart Golf (1909-1945); Hartwig Golf (1913-1998); Friedegard Golf (1918-)
- Parent(s): Richard Golf; Marie Schmidt

Arthur Golf (21 July 1877 – 18 February 1941) was a German academic agronomist. A principal focus of his teaching and research was on "colonial agriculture": another was "selective breeding", concentrating on sheep. During his later years he was a professor at Leipzig University where between 1933 and 1935, and again during 1936/37, he served as University Rector.

== Life ==
Richard Arthur Golf was born into a Protestant family in Beyersdorf, a rural settlement in the marshy flatlands to the north-east of Halle. His father, Richard Golf, was a "gentleman farmer" ("Rittergutsbesitzer"): several of his remoter ancestors were also landowner-farmers. He successfully concluded his schooling at the Stadtgymnasium (principal secondary school) at Halle in 1896 and went on to work as an agricultural apprentice on at least two working estates in Saxony. During 1897/98 he undertook his military service as a volunteer in an artillery regiment in Breslau (as Wrocław was known at that time). He went on to study agriculture at Breslau and Halle, and then, from 1901, at the Agriculture Academy in Bonn-Poppelsdorf ("Institut für Bodenlehre und Pflanzenbau an der Landwirtschaftsakademie Bonn-Poppeldorf"). In 1901 he obtained his teaching certificate in agriculture.

Golf was much influenced by Ferdinand Wohltmann, a pioneer in the development of "colonial agronomy" as an academic subject. He became an assistant to Wohltmann at the academy in Bonn-Poppeldorf during 1901. During 1902 he participated in a five-month research trip to North America, the purpose of which was to investigate the irrigation-based agriculture there. The North America trip provided the material for his dissertation, and in 1903 he received his doctorate from Martin Luther University of Halle-Wittenberg for a piece of work on the natural underpinnings of the American irrigation-based economy. After that he worked as an assistant to Julius Kühn at the Physiology Laboratory of the Agronomy Institute at Halle. It was also at Halle that Golf received his habilitation (higher academic degree), in 1907, in a piece of work which appears to have built further on the work undertaken on agricultural irrigation in North America.

That same year he was commissioned by the Imperial Colonial Office to undertake an expedition to South and Southwest Africa. This was followed by similar trips to East Africa, Central Asia and Scandinavia (and other places). The core objective was to research the relationship between water management and arable agriculture. One result of these expeditions, which appeared in 1911, was a book on Arable Agronomy in German South West Africa, which dealt with "Trockenfarmen" (farming in dry conditions). After that, in 1912, he was appointed to a permanent extraordinary professorship at Leipzig with a teaching contract that covered colonial and foreign/tropical agronomy.

War broke out at the end of July 1914 which interrupted Golf's academic career. He served on the frontline as a cavalry officer ("Rittmeister"). Just over four years later war ended in defeat for Germany and he returned to civilian life. Like many demobilized officers, Golf strongly opposed the new republican government which was associated with the shame of military defeat and the enforced abdication of The Kaiser. One aspect of the imposed Peace of Versailles that directly affected Golf was the confiscation of German South West Africa and Germany's other colonies outside Europe. "Colonial Agriculture" was no longer an academic discipline with a bright future. Obliged to find himself a supplementary academic speciality, he built up an expertise in selective breeding.

In 1922 Golf was appointed to a full professorship of animal husbandry ("Tierzucht") at Leipzig University in the "Mathematics and Natural Sciences" department of the Faculty of Philosophy, taking on the position that had fallen vacant through the death, the previous summer, of Wilhelm Kirchner. The post was one which Golf would retain till his death in 1941. He headed up, as responsible professor, the "Institute of Animal Husbandry and Dairying" (till 1928 the "Institute of the Dairy Industry and Economy"). To some extent he was able to invoke his earlier expertise in colonial agriculture in support of his new department. Although the scope of his responsibilities was a broad one, his own research centred on the Karakul sheep, a hardy and, it turned out, adaptable breed originally from central Asia which continues to flourish in Namibia, having been introduced by German colonists to what was, till 1919, German South West Africa. The Karakul was introduced to Germany itself during the 1920s and 1930s with 9,758 registed in Germany in 1935 (though by 2013 the number had slumped to fewer than 300). For many years Golf also ran the "Zeitschrift für Schafzucht" ("Journal for Sheep Husbandry"). During the later 1920s and early 1930s Golf was also able to undertake further research expeditions, both to South West Africa, where many farmers of German origin still lived and worked despite the political changes and, during the first part of 1928, to what was at that time Soviet Central Asia. He also produced several pieces of research on problems of milk quality and directed Germany's first experiments involving introducing hormones into pig feed.

The German Colonial Society, founded originally in 1887, continued its activities through and beyond the 1920s. Golf was a committed member of it during the years of political and social instability that dominated the agenda in Germany after 1918. He also became a member in 1920 of the German Popular Protection and Revanchism League ("Deutschvölkische Schutz- und Trutzbund" / DVSTB), a nationalist movement noted, even at the time, for its savage antisemitism. It was among the most prominent of various organisations that emerged as a reaction to the disaster of the First World War along with the unfolding economic, social and political crisis of the early 1920s. Because of the extent to which its beliefs were adopted and then integrated into government policy by the Nazi Party after 1933 the DVSTB acquired a retrospective significance that might well have surprised observers fifteen years earlier, .

Towards the end of the 1920s populist political parties, notably the Communist Party and the Nazi Party, enjoyed growing support across Germany, especially (though by no means exclusively) in the industrial cities, while the more moderate traditional parties, both of the left and of the right, found themselves crowded out to the point at which, by 1932, it would become impossible to form a government in Germany without backing from the extremists. Political polarisation was reflected among students at the universities. Golf was an early admirer of Adolf Hitler and there are suggestions that at Leipzig University he was able to persuade some students to the Nazi cause. He himself joined the Nazi Party in 1932, being the first professor at the university to make the move. For the party he became a Vertrauensdozent (liaison lecturer), identified as a link man between the university and the National Socialist German Students' League ("Nationalsozialistischer Deutscher Studentenbund" / NSDStB).

The Nazis finally took power in January 1933. They lost no time in transforming the country into a one-party dictatorship. As a committed party member Golf suddenly found himself on the inside track with the political establishment. He was appointed Rector of the university between 1933 and 1935. Early in 1935 the Education Minister replaced him due to a perceived absence of vigour in pushing through of party policy (aufgrund "mangelnden Durchsetzungsvermögens"). However Felix Krueger, his successor evidently displayed similar shortcomings, and when Krueger was dismissed, Golf was reinstalled as university Rector for a further winter term, between October 1936 and March 1937. Earlier on he also served as university pro-dean and dean.

After 1937, having reached the age of 60, he withdrew from high office at the university and returned with renewed energy to work on colonial agriculture. Beyond his university offices Golf held various honorary posts and memberships connected with his animal research work. In 1937 he was accepted into the Leopoldina.

The Invasion of Poland in September 1939 marked the return of war, and his energies were devoted increasingly to the simple business of keeping the university's research and teaching activities going. Golf died at Leipzig on 18 February 1941.

== Publications (selection) ==
- Untersuchungen über die natürlichen Grundlagen der nordamerikanischen Bewässerungswirtschaft. Doctoral dissertation. Univ. Halle 1903.
- Die Technik der künstlichen Bewässerung in Nordamerika. Habilitation dissertation. Univ. Halle 1907.
- Ackerbau in Deutsch=Südwestafrika. Das Trockenfarmen und seine Anwendung in D.S.W.A. Wilhelm Süsserott (publisher) Berlin 1911 = Koloniale Abhandlungen Issues 47/50.
- Die Kartoffelbestellung. Berlin 1916 = Arbeiten der Gesellschaft zur Förderung des Baues und der wirtschaftlich zweckmäßigen Verwendung der Kartoffeln Issue 7.
- Die Sowjet-Agrarreform und der Landwirtschaftsbetrieb in Russisch-Mittelasien. E. Chr. Seyfert (publisher) Leipzig 1929 = Arbeiten der Leipziger Oekonomischen Societät.
- Schafzucht. In: Handbuch der Landwirtschaft. Herausgegeben von F. Aereboe, J. Hansen und Th. Roemer. Verlagsbuchhandlung Paul Parey Berlin 1929, vol. 5, pp. 265–335.
- 60 Jahre landwirtschaftliches Institut der Universität Leipzig 1869-1929. Produced by the Landwirtschaftlichen Institut der Universität Leipzig 1930.
