= Glebitzsch =

- Stadtteil of Sandersdorf-Brehna
- Interactive map of Glebitzsch
- Location within Germany Location within Saxony-Anhalt
- Coordinates: 51°36′N 12°12′E
- Country: Germany
- State: Saxony-Anhalt
- District: Anhalt-Bitterfeld
- Town: Sandersdorf-Brehna
- Subdivisions: 2

Area
  - Total: 15.12 km^{2} (5.84 sq mi)
- Elevation: 91 m (299 ft)

Population (2006-12-31)
  - Total: 659
  - Density: 43.6/km^{2} (113/sq mi)
- Time zone: UTC+01:00 (CET)
  - Summer (DST): UTC+02:00 (CEST)
- Postal codes: 06794
- Dialling codes: 034954
- Vehicle registration: ABI

Glebitzsch (German pronunciation: [ˈɡleːbɪtʃ]) is a village and a former municipality in the district of Anhalt-Bitterfeld, in Saxony-Anhalt, Germany. Since 1 July 2009, it is part of the town Sandersdorf-Brehna.
