= Sandersdorf =

Village in Saxony-Anhalt, Germany

- Stadtteil of Sandersdorf-Brehna
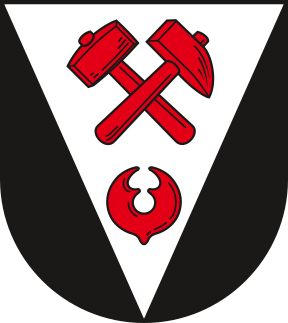
- Coat of arms
- Interactive map of Sandersdorf
- Location within Germany Location within Saxony-Anhalt
- Coordinates: 51°37′11″N 12°14′24″E
- Country: Germany
- State: Saxony-Anhalt
- District: Anhalt-Bitterfeld
- Town: Sandersdorf-Brehna
- Subdivisions: 5

Area
  - Total: 24.09 km^{2} (9.30 sq mi)
- Elevation: 90 m (300 ft)

Population (2006-12-31)
  - Total: 9,552
  - Density: 396.5/km^{2} (1,027/sq mi)
- Time zone: UTC+01:00 (CET)
  - Summer (DST): UTC+02:00 (CEST)
- Postal codes: 06780, 06792, 06794
- Dialling codes: 03493
- Vehicle registration: ABI
- Website: sandersdorf-brehna.de

Sandersdorf (German pronunciation: [ˈzandɐsdɔʁf]) is a village and a former municipality in the district of Anhalt-Bitterfeld, in Saxony-Anhalt, Germany. Since 1 July 2009, it is part of the town Sandersdorf-Brehna. It is situated approximately 5 km west of Bitterfeld, and 27 km northeast of Halle (Saale).

It is the birthplace of German author Johann Gottfried Schnabel.
