= Petersroda =

- Stadtteil of Sandersdorf-Brehna
- Coat of arms
- Interactive map of Petersroda
- Location within Germany Location within Saxony-Anhalt
- Coordinates: 51°34′N 12°17′E
- Country: Germany
- State: Saxony-Anhalt
- District: Anhalt-Bitterfeld
- Town: Sandersdorf-Brehna

Area
  - Total: 6.22 km^{2} (2.40 sq mi)
- Elevation: 92 m (302 ft)

Population (2022)
  - Total: 567
  - Density: 91.2/km^{2} (236/sq mi)
- Time zone: UTC+01:00 (CET)
  - Summer (DST): UTC+02:00 (CEST)
- Postal codes: 06809
- Dialling codes: 034954
- Vehicle registration: ABI

Petersroda (German pronunciation: [peːtɐsˈʁoːda]) is a village and a former municipality in the district of Anhalt-Bitterfeld, in Saxony-Anhalt, Germany. Since 1 July 2009, it is part of the town Sandersdorf-Brehna.
