= Robinsonade =

Literary genre

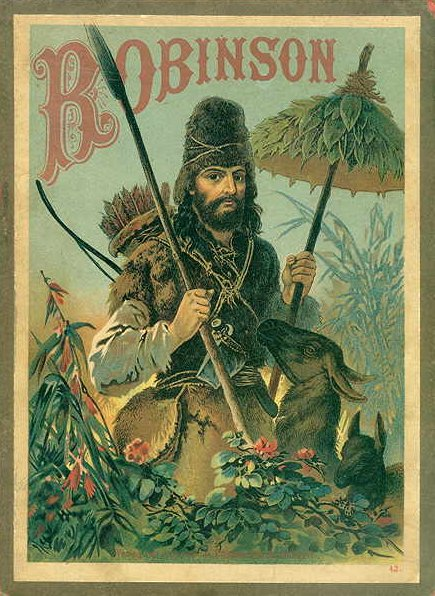
Robinson Crusoe in an 1887 illustration

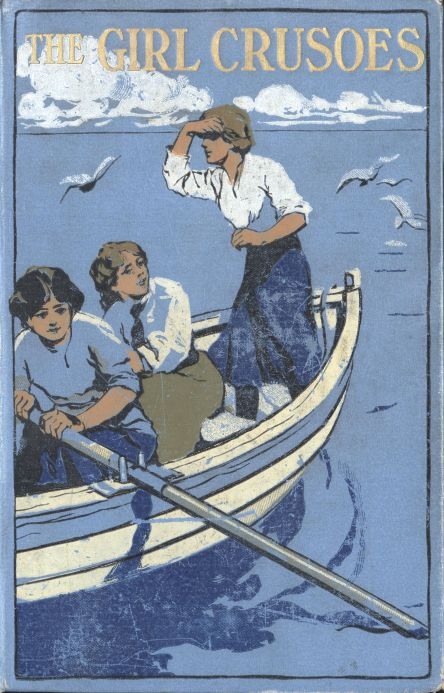
The Girl Crusoes (1912)

Robinsonade (/ˌrɒbɪnsəˈneɪd/ ROB-in-sən-AYD) is a literary genre of fiction wherein a person or a group of persons is suddenly separated from civilization, usually by being shipwrecked or marooned on a secluded and uninhabited island, and must improvise the means of their survival from the limited resources at hand. The genre takes its name from the 1719 novel Robinson Crusoe by Daniel Defoe. The success of this novel spawned so many imitations that its name was used to define a genre, which is sometimes described simply as a "desert island story" or a "castaway narrative".

The word "robinsonade" was coined by the German writer Johann Gottfried Schnabel in the Preface of his 1731 novel Palisades Island (German: Insel Felsenburg). It is often viewed as a subgenre of survivalist fiction.

== Common themes ==
Common themes of robinsonade works include the protagonists being in a state of isolation (e.g. on a desert island or an uninhabited planet), a new beginning for the work's characters, self-reflection as a plot point, contact with indigenous peoples or extraterrestrial life and social commentary.

== Inverted Crusoeism ==
The term inverted Crusoeism was coined by English writer J. G. Ballard. The paradigm of Robinson Crusoe has been a recurring topic in Ballard's work. Whereas the original Robinson Crusoe became a castaway against his own will, Ballard's protagonists often choose to maroon themselves; hence inverted Crusoeism (e.g., Concrete Island). The concept provides a reason as to why people would deliberately maroon themselves on a remote island; in Ballard's work, becoming a castaway is as much a healing and empowering process as an entrapping one, enabling people to discover a more meaningful and vital existence.

== Science fiction robinsonade ==
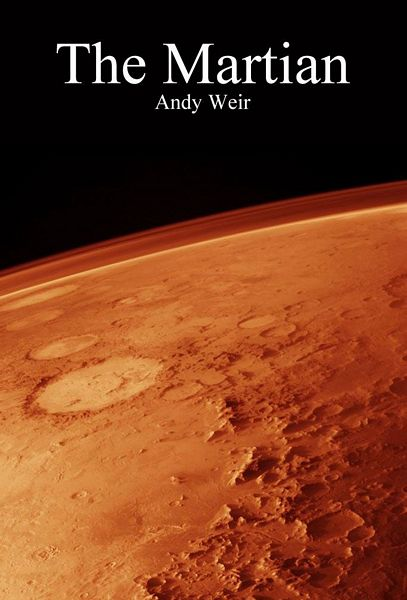
Cover of The Martian, 2011 by Andy Weir

Science fiction robinsonades tend to be set on uninhabited planets or satellites ("space robinsonade") rather than islands. The Moon is the location of Ralph Morris's "proto-SF" The Life and Wonderful Adventures of John Daniel (1751) which included "A Deſcription of a moſt ſurpriſing Engine, invented by his Son Jacob, on which he flew to the Moon" and of John W. Campbell's paean to human inventiveness, The Moon Is Hell! (1950). A popular venue of SF robinsonades is Mars, e.g., Rex Gordon's No Man Friday (1956) or Andy Weir's 2011 The Martian and its 2015 film adaptation. Joanna Russ' We Who Are About To... (1977) is a radical feminist objection to the genre.

Sears List of Subject Headings recommends that librarians also catalog apocalyptic fiction—such as Cormac McCarthy's 2006 novel The Road, or Robert A. Heinlein's Starship Troopers (1959)—as robinsonades.

== See also ==
- Accidental travel
- Desert island joke
- Edisonade
- Nautical fiction
