= Roitzsch =

- Stadtteil of Sandersdorf-Brehna
- Coat of arms
- Interactive map of Roitzsch
- Location within Germany Location within Saxony-Anhalt
- Coordinates: 51°34′34″N 12°15′57″E
- Country: Germany
- State: Saxony-Anhalt
- District: Anhalt-Bitterfeld
- Town: Sandersdorf-Brehna

Area
  - Total: 17.14 km^{2} (6.62 sq mi)
- Elevation: 88 m (289 ft)

Population (2006-12-31)
  - Total: 2,591
  - Density: 151.2/km^{2} (391.5/sq mi)
- Time zone: UTC+01:00 (CET)
  - Summer (DST): UTC+02:00 (CEST)
- Postal codes: 06809
- Dialling codes: 034954
- Vehicle registration: ABI

Roitzsch (German pronunciation: [ʁoːtʃ]) is a village and a former municipality in the district of Anhalt-Bitterfeld, in Saxony-Anhalt, Germany. Since 1 July 2009, it is part of the town Sandersdorf-Brehna.
