= Schwarzenberg Castle (Saxony) =

Museum in Germany

Coordinates: 50°32′14.93″N 12°47′14.24″E

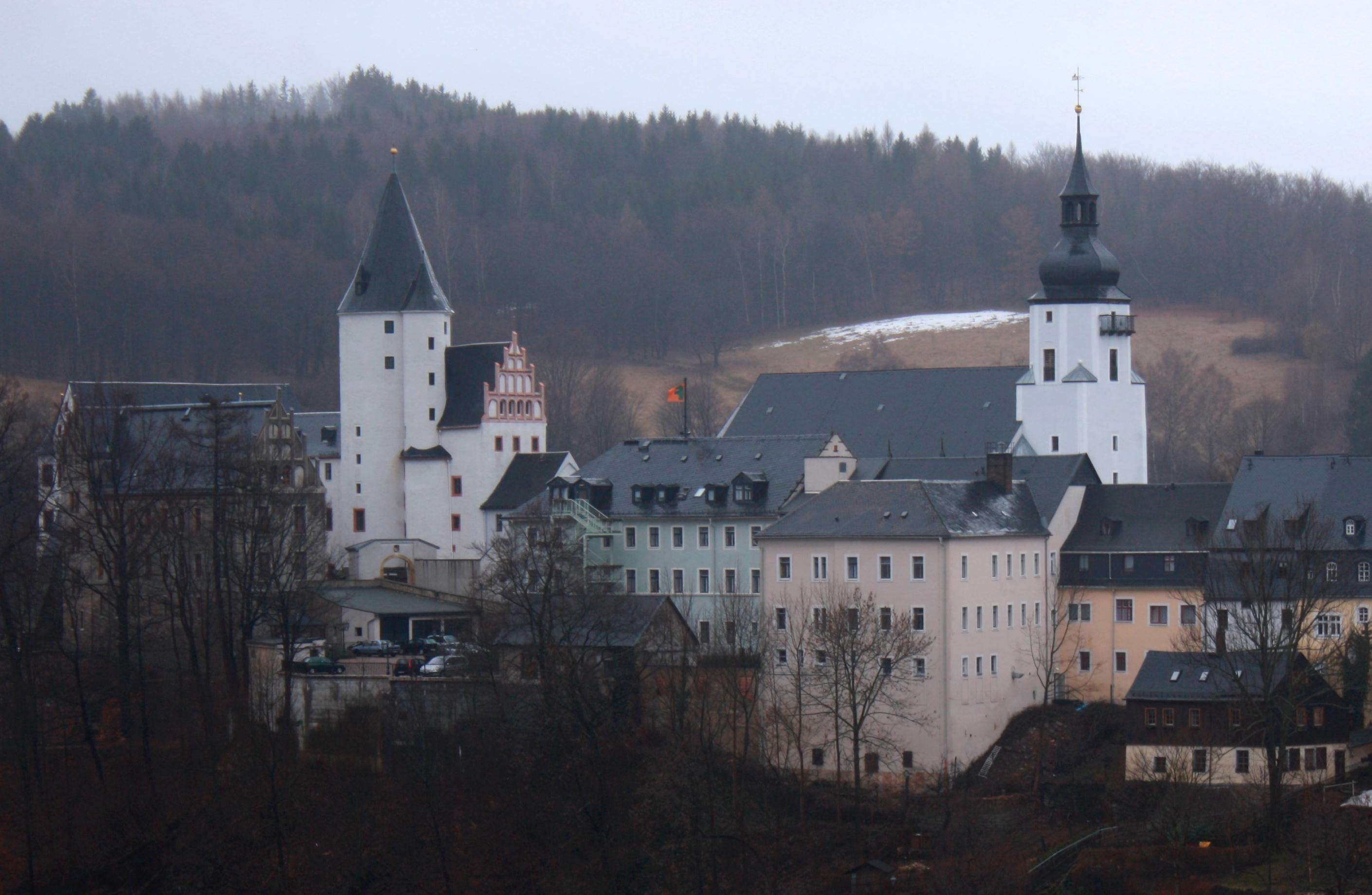
Schwarzenberg Castle and St. George's Church

Schwarzenberg Castle (German: Schloss Schwarzenberg) is a castle and museum in Germany. It was based on a medieval fortification and together with St. George's Church dominates the scene of the large county town of Schwarzenberg in Saxony's district of Erzgebirgskreis.

== Construction history ==
The castle was probably founded in the 12th century as a fort and was the original base for the settlement of Schwarzenberg and its vicinity. The former castle was given its present appearance by a conversion into a hunting lodge for the Electorate of Saxony from 1555 to 1558. In 1851-1852, its keep and south wing were raised, and in 1875-1876, an office building extension was added.

== Bibliography ==
- Georg Dehio: Handbuch der Deutschen Kunstdenkmäler Sachsen: II. Regierungsbezirke Leipzig und Chemnitz. Deutscher Kunstverlag, München 1998, S. 908.
- Walter Fröbe: Herrschaft und Stadt Schwarzenberg bis zum 16. Jahrhundert, Schwarzenberg: Geschichtsverein, 1930-1937.
- Hans Becher: Schloss Schwarzenberg: Baugeschichte, Ereignisse, Museum Erzgebirgisches Eisen und Zinn Schwarzenberg, 1984
- Götz Altmann: Damit es in alter Schönheit erstrahlt - Zur Rekonstruktion und Restaurierung des Schlosses Schwarzenberg. In: Erzgebirgische Heimatblätter 3/1980, S. 66–67, ISSN 0232-6078
