= Palisades Island =

1731 novel by Johann Gottfried Schnabel

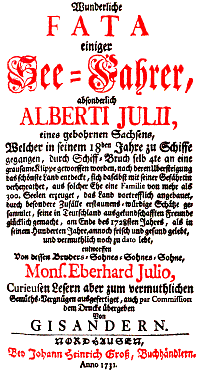
- Title page from 1731
- Author: Johann Gottfried Schnabel
- Original title: Wunderliche Fata einiger See-Fahrer...
- Translator: John W. Van Cleve
- Language: German
- Publisher: Johann Heinrich Groß
- Publication date: 1731
- Publication place: Holy Roman Empire
- English publication date: 2017
- Pages: 608

Palisades Island (German: Insel Felsenburg, lit. 'Rock Castle Island') is a novel by the German writer Johann Gottfried Schnabel, first published under the pseudonym Gisander in 1731. It is about a sailor who has been shipwrecked on an island in the South Sea and ends up creating a large family that forms an ideal society. The book became very popular and Schnabel wrote three sequels.

== Plot ==
Eberhard Julius learns that his great-great-uncle Albertus Julius is the patriarch of an island in the South Sea called Felsenburg. Eberhard travels there with a few other people and is greeted by the then 97-year-old Albertus, who shows him around the island, which is designed to be an ideal society based on orderly communal life and work. Albertus tells his life story: how he was a sailor who was shipwrecked on the island, started a family and a society with other castaways who gradually ended up on the island, and became wealthy by finding hidden treasures. Eberhard and his friends are introduced to life on the island, where they eventually decide to remain as permanent residents.

== Publication ==
The book was printed by Johann Heinrich Groß in Nordhausen in 1731 and published under the pseudonym Gisander. It initially had a long title that begins with Wunderliche Fata einiger See-Fahrer (lit. 'Strange Fate of a Seafarer') and first appeared as Insel Felsenburg in 1828, in an abridged version edited by Ludwig Tieck. An English translation by John W. Van Cleve was published in 2017 as Palisades Island: A Translation of Insel Felsenburg.

== Reception ==
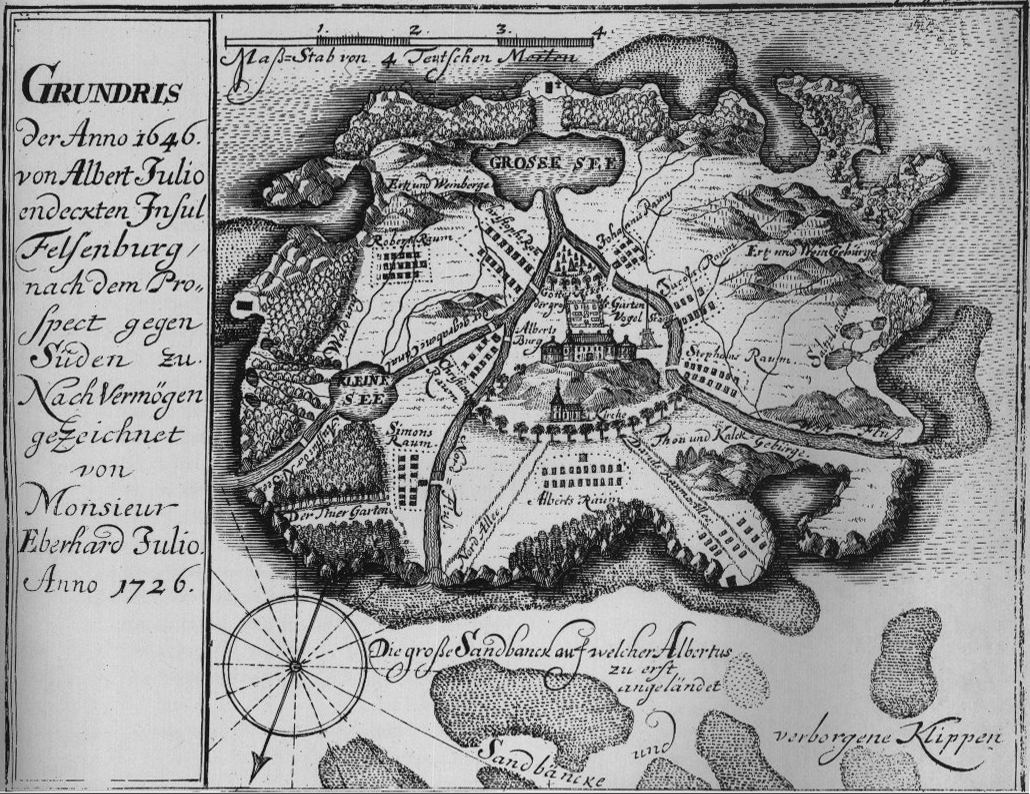
Map of Felsenburg Island from 1731

The book was highly popular in 18th-century Germany and inspired several imitations. It has been read as a mixture of Robinsonade and social utopia. This was highlighted by the literary historian Fritz Brüggemann in the 1914 study Utopie und Robinsonade. Schnabel denied in the preface that the book had any didactic or political purpose. This has been accepted by later scholars such as Hans Steffen, who in 1961 argued that its utopianism and originality had been over-estimated, placing it in a context of late Baroque literature.

== Sequels ==
The commercial success prompted Schnabel to write three sequels which were published in 1732, 1736 and 1743. The sequels take place after the death of Albertus and follow several of Felsenburg's inhabitants. The stories become increasingly disjointed, consisting of a mixture of adventures and essayistic parts.

== See also ==
- Rock castle
