= Johann Gottfried Schnabel =

German writer

- Born: November 7, 1692; Sandersdorf, Germany
- Died: c. 1751–1758 (aged 58–66)
- Occupation: Writer
- Writing career
- Pen name: Gisander
- Notable work: Palisades Island

Johann Gottfried Schnabel (November 7, 1692 – c. 1751–1758) was a German writer best known for his novel Palisades Island. He published his works under the pen name Gisander.

Schnabel was born in Sandersdorf near Bitterfeld, today's Germany. Orphaned in 1694, he was raised by relatives. After an apprenticeship with a barber from 1706 to 1709, Schnabel worked as a Feldsher, a military barber-surgeon, in the regiments of Wolfenbüttel and Saxony until 1717. In this capacity he took part in the War of the Spanish Succession. In 1719, Schnabel settled as a master barber in Querfurt. From 1724 he was court barber in the County of Stolberg-Wernigerode, where he was promoted to valet de chambre in 1729 and to court agent around 1737. The year 1750 shows the last record of Schnabel's life; his death date and place are unknown.

== Palisades Island ==
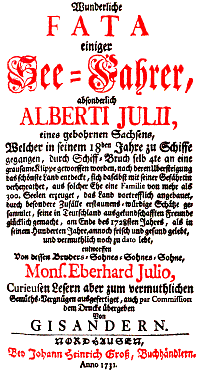
Title page of the 1731 edition of Palisades Island

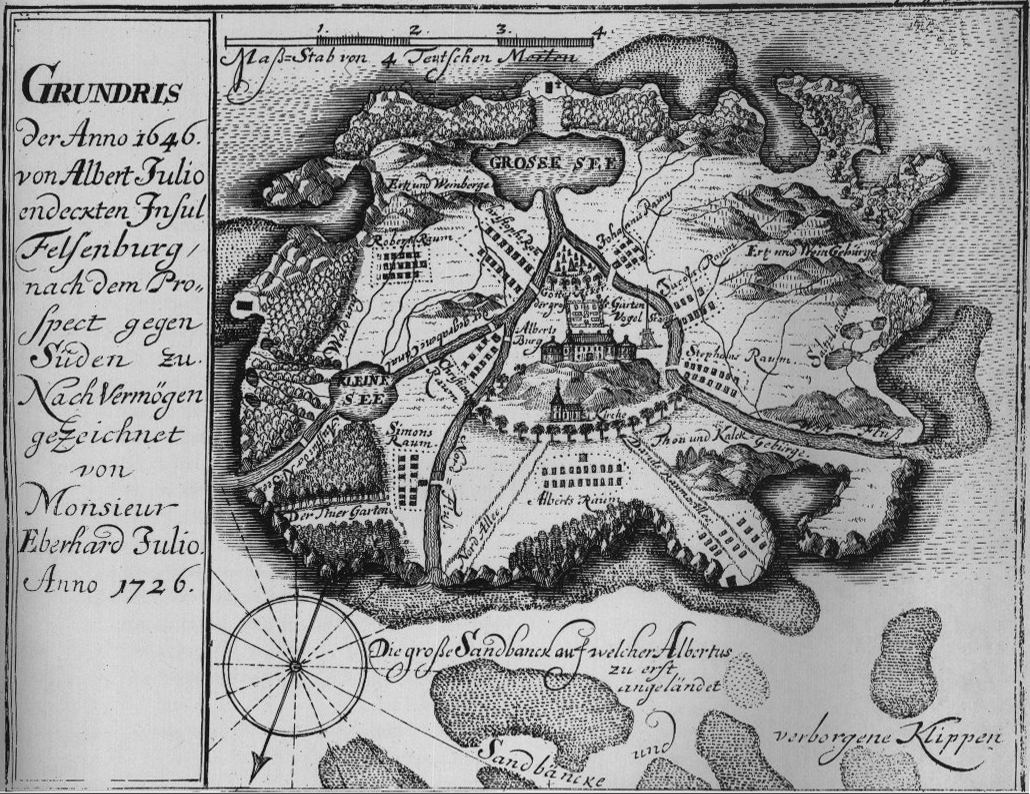
Map of Felsenburg

The novel Palisades Island (German: Insel Felsenburg, lit. 'Rock Castle Island') was originally published in 1731 under the title

Wunderliche Fata einiger Seefahrer, absonderlich Alberti Julii, eines geborenen Sachsens, welcher in seinem 18den Jahre zu Schiffe gegangen, durch Schiff-Bruch selb 4te an eine grausame Klipe geworffen worden, nach deren Übersteigung das schönste Land entdeckt, sich daselbst mit seiner Gefährtin verheyrathet, aus solcher Ehe eine Familie mit mehr als 300 Seelen erzeuget, das Land vortrefflich angebauet, durch besondere Zufälle erstaunens-würdige Schätze gesammlet, seine in Teutschland ausgekundschafften Freunde glücklich gemacht, am Ende des 1728sten Jahres, als in seinem Hunderten Jahre, annoch frisch und gesund gelebt, und vermuthlich noch zu dato lebt, entworffen Von dessen Bruders-Sohnes-Sohnes-Sohne, Mons. Eberhard Julio, Curieusen Lesern aber zum vermuthlichen Gemüths-Vergnügen ausgefertiget, auch par Commission dem Drucke übergeben Von Gisandern.

The title was only in 1828 shortened into Insel Felsenburg when republished in an abridged version by German romanticist Ludwig Tieck.

The title summarizes the book. It is about a seaman who is shipwrecked on the coast of an island, where he marries and starts a family of 300. It combines themes of the then-popular genre of the robinsonade with elements of a social utopia.

The book was highly successful when it was published. German author Arno Schmidt wrote in a review to a reissue of the book: "It is attested that around and after 1750 the library of a commoner consisted of at least two volumes: the Bible and the Insel Felsenburg." Due to the success of the original work, Schnabel published three sequels of decreasing quality.

== Works ==
- Wunderliche Fata einiger See-Fahrer... (Insel Felsenburg) (1731, sequels in 1732, 1736 and 1743)
- Lebens- Helden- und Todes-Geschicht des berühmtesten Feld-Herrn bißheriger Zeiten Eugenii Francisci, Printzen von Savoyen und Piemont... (1736)
- Der im Irr-Garten der Liebe herum taumelnde Cavalier... (1738, published anonymously)
- Der aus dem Mond gefallene und nachhero zur Sonne des Glücks gestiegene Printz... (1750)

== Translation ==
- Palisades Island: A Translation of Insel Felsenburg by J. G. Schnabel. Translated by John W. Van Cleve (Mellen: Lewiston and Lampeter, 2017)
