= Brehna =

Town in Saxony-Anhalt, Germany

- Stadtteil of Sandersdorf-Brehna
- Coat of arms
- Interactive map of Brehna
- Location within Germany Location within Saxony-Anhalt
- Coordinates: 51°32′N 12°13′E
- Country: Germany
- State: Saxony-Anhalt
- District: Anhalt-Bitterfeld
- Town: Sandersdorf-Brehna

Area
  - Total: 19.14 km^{2} (7.39 sq mi)
- Elevation: 95 m (312 ft)

Population (2006-12-31)
  - Total: 2,956
  - Density: 154.4/km^{2} (400.0/sq mi)
- Time zone: UTC+01:00 (CET)
  - Summer (DST): UTC+02:00 (CEST)
- Postal codes: 06796
- Dialling codes: 034954
- Vehicle registration: ABI
- Website: sandersdorf-brehna.de

Brehna (German pronunciation: [ˈbʁeːna]) is a town and a former municipality in the district of Anhalt-Bitterfeld, in Saxony-Anhalt, Germany. Since 1 July 2009, it is part of the town Sandersdorf-Brehna.

It is situated southwest of Bitterfeld. Important in this city is the church where Katharina von Bora, the wife of Martin Luther lived.

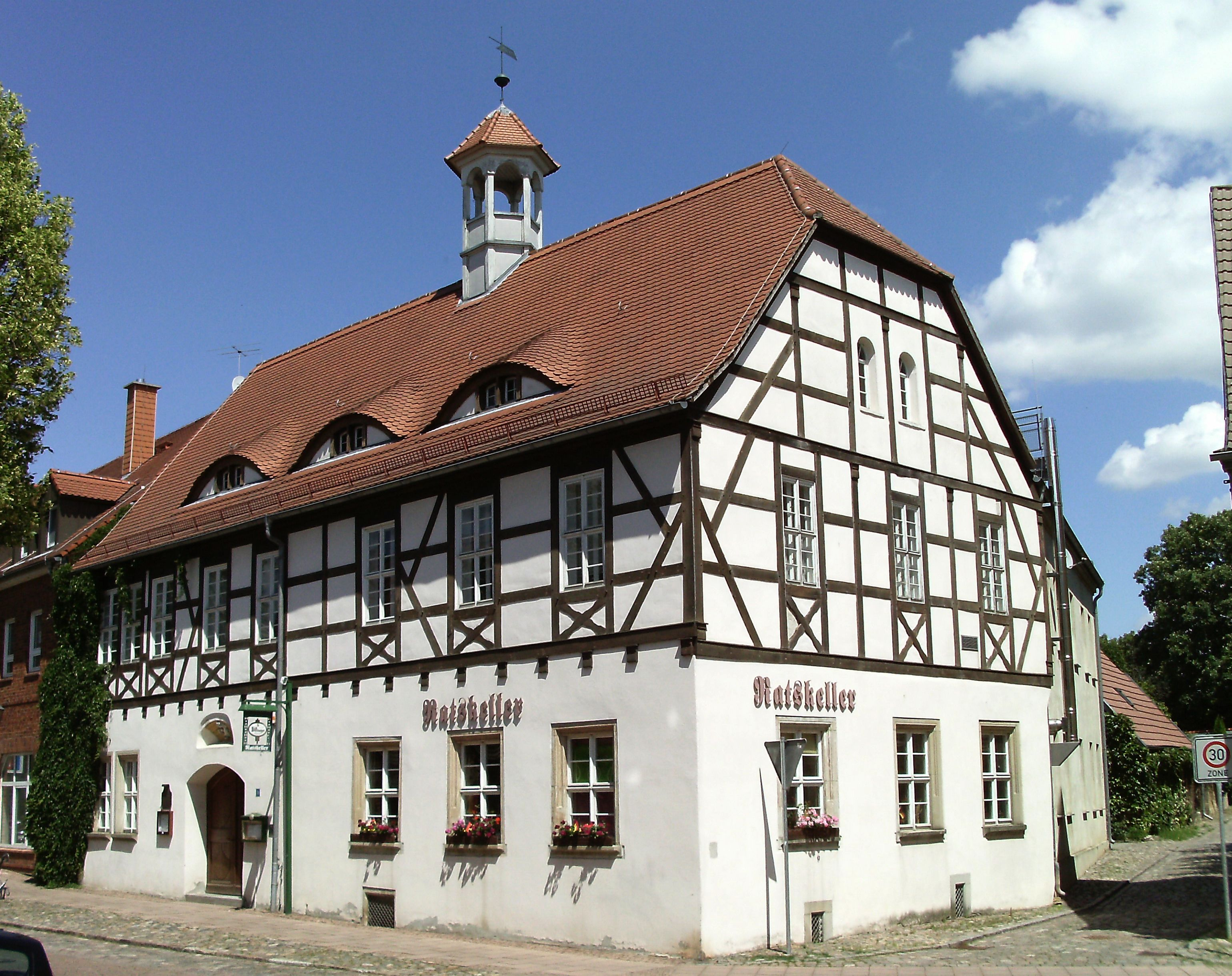
old town hall

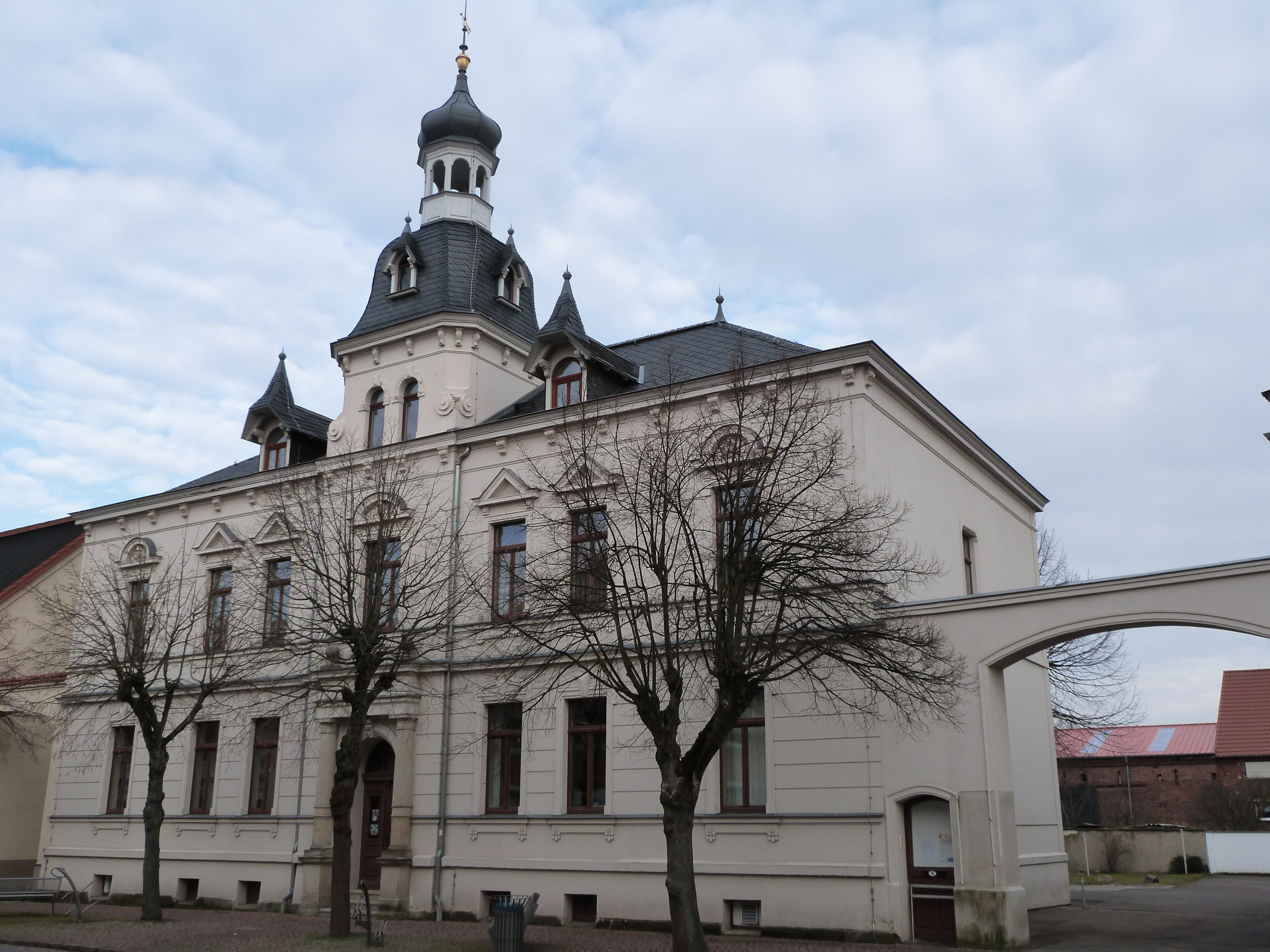
new town hall

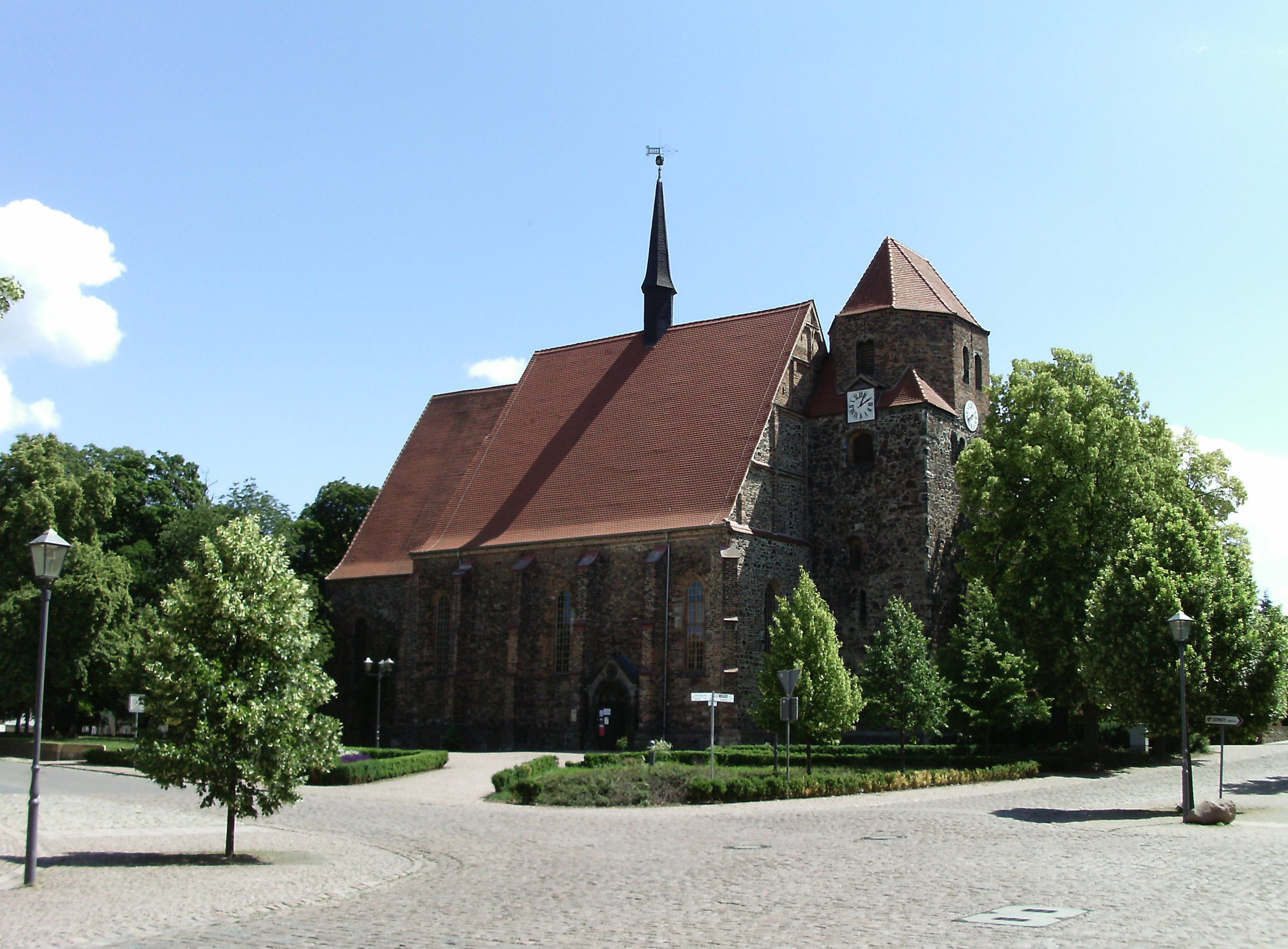
church
