= White Mulde =

River in Germany

White Mulde Weiße Mulde
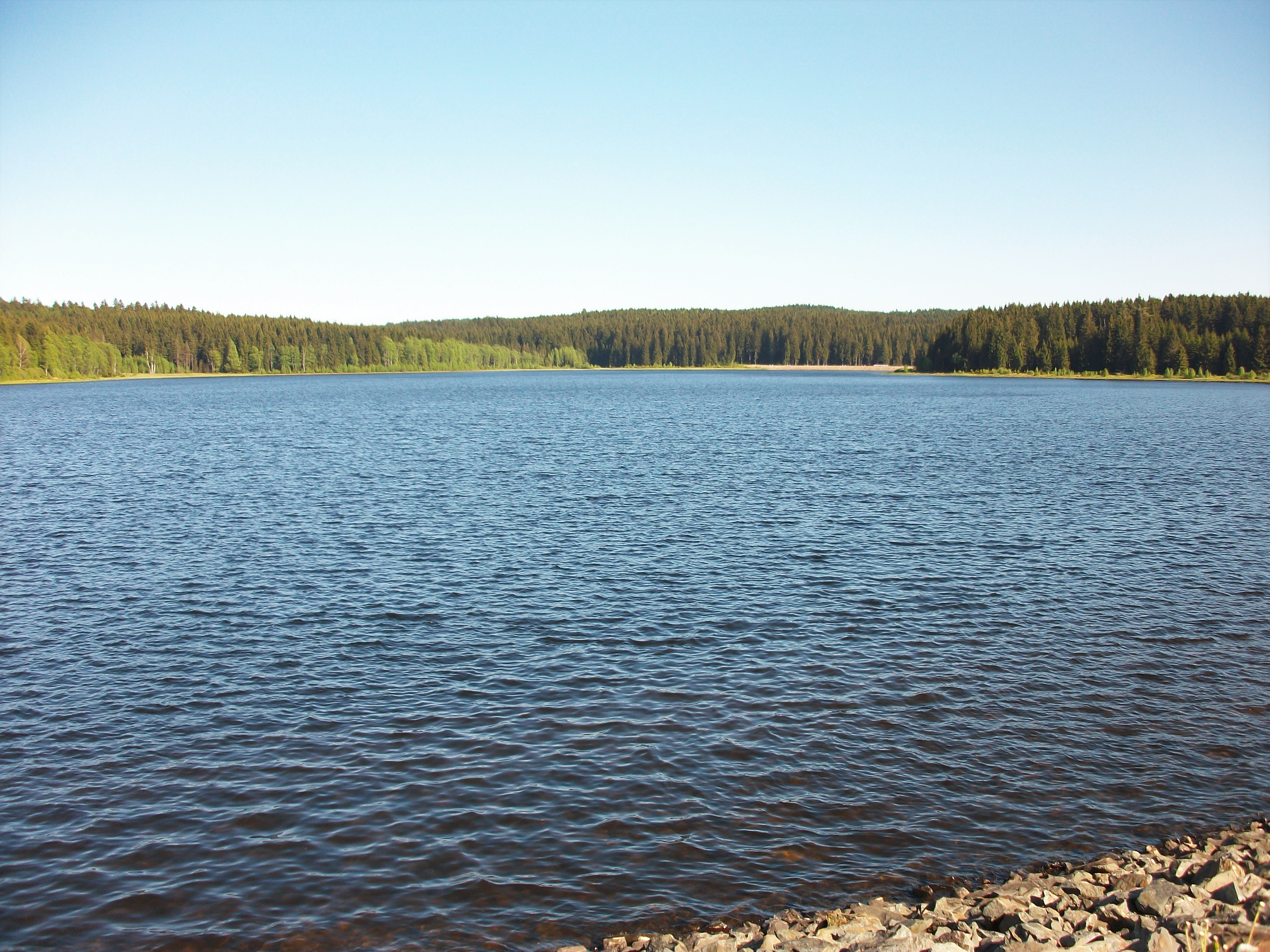

Location
- Country: Germany
- State: Saxony

Physical characteristics
- Source
  - location: north of Kottenheide at the Oberer Muldeteich pond
  - coordinates: 50.3811250°N 12.3987389°E
  - elevation: ca. 770 m (2,530 ft)
- Mouth
  - location: on the Muldenberg Reservoir
  - elevation: ca. 710 m (2,330 ft)
- Length: 3 km (1.9 mi)

Basin features
- Progression: Zwickauer Mulde→ Mulde→ Elbe→ North Sea

The White Mulde (German: Weiße Mulde) is the right headstream of the Zwickauer Mulde in the Vogtland region of Saxony, Germany.

== Course ==
The White Mulde rises north of Kottenheide, a village in the borough of Schöneck, at an elevation of 770 m above NN. Its source is in the pond of Oberer Muldeteich. The White Mulde runs in a northerly direction, through the Unterer Muldeteich and discharges after about 3 km into the Muldenberg Reservoir. There it unites with the Red Mulde to form the Zwickauer Mulde.

== See also ==
- List of rivers of Saxony
