= Würschnitz =

River in Germany

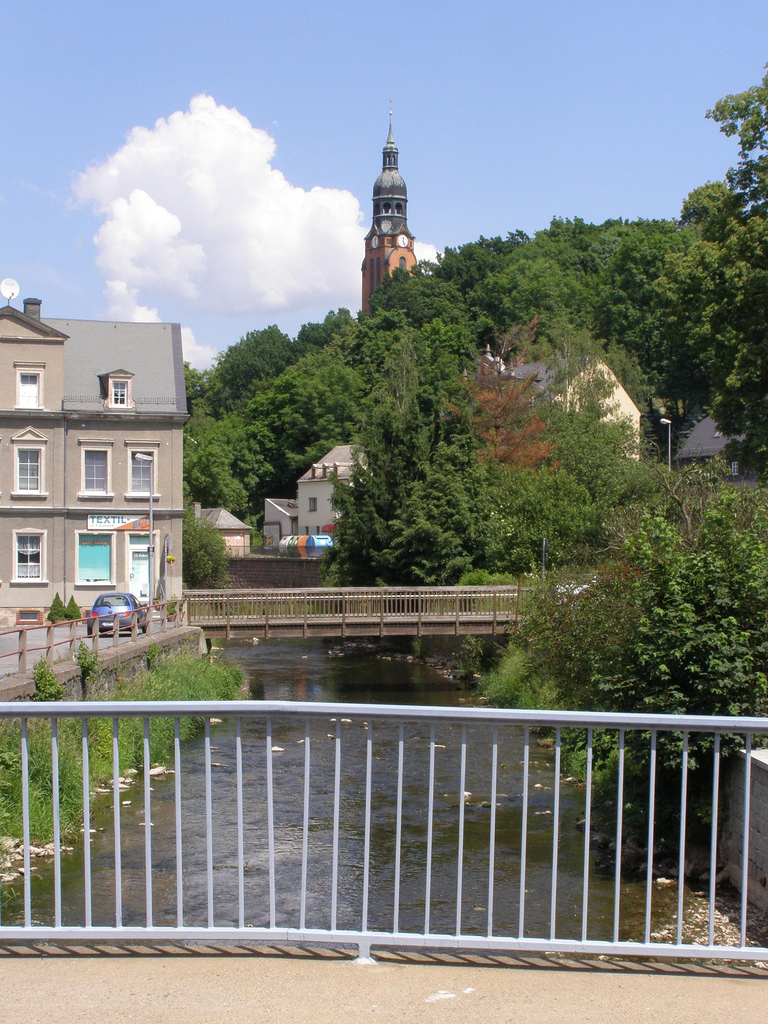

Location
- Country: Germany
- State: Saxony

Physical characteristics
- Mouth
  - location: Chemnitz
  - coordinates: 50°47′23″N 12°55′27″E
- Length: 29 km (18 mi)

Basin features
- Progression: Chemnitz→ Zwickauer Mulde→ Mulde→ Elbe→ North Sea

The Würschnitz is a river of Saxony, Germany. At its confluence with the Zwönitz in the southern suburbs of Chemnitz, the river Chemnitz is formed.

== See also ==
- List of rivers of Saxony
