= Wolfsbrunn =

Wolfsbrunn may refer to:

- Wolfsbrunn (Hollabrunn), village and cadastral municipality in Lower Austria
- Wolfsbrunn Castle (Burg or Schloss Wolfsbrunn), both abandoned, in Wolfsbrunn (Hollabrunn)
- Schloss Wolfsbrunn, formerly a grand villa, now a hotel, in Hartenstein, Saxony
- Wolfsbrunnen (Heidelberg), Brunnen, Germany
- Wolfsbrunnen Castle, Hesse, Germany
