= Chemnitz (river) =

River in Germany

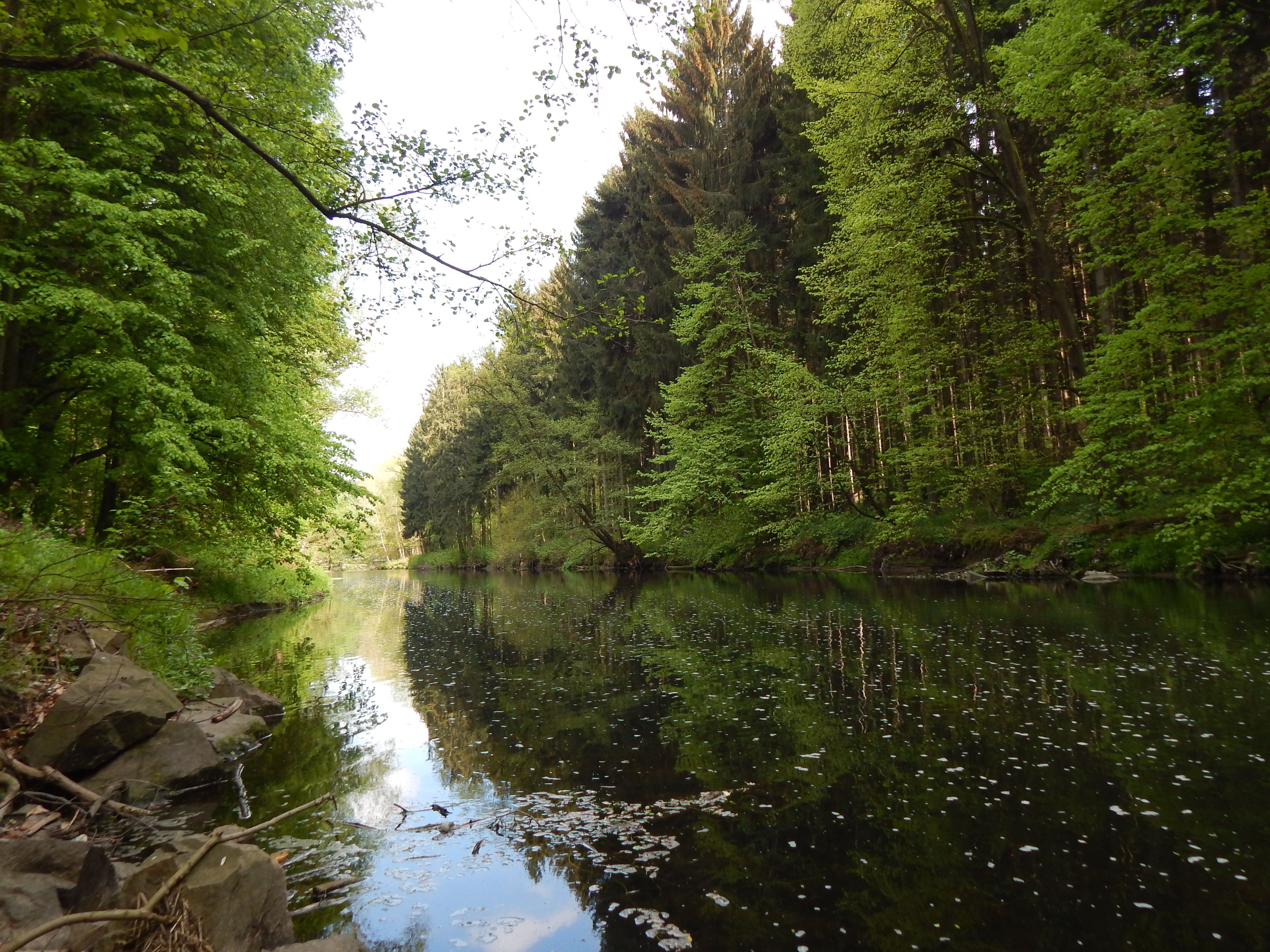
- Chemnitz River in May 2014

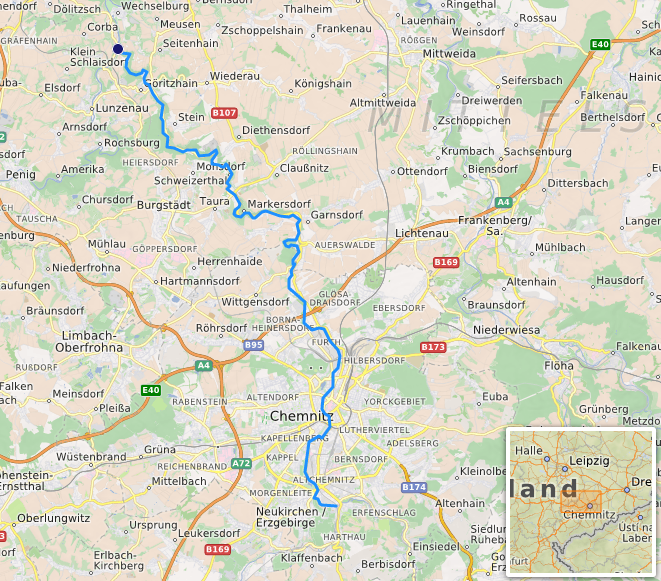

Location
- Country: Germany

Physical characteristics
- Source
  - location: Zwönitz and Würschnitz
- Mouth
  - location: Zwickauer Mulde
  - coordinates: 50°59′15″N 12°46′28″E
- Length: 75 km (47 mi)

Basin features
- Progression: Zwickauer Mulde→ Mulde→ Elbe→ North Sea

The Chemnitz is a river in Saxony, Germany, a right tributary of the Zwickauer Mulde. It gave name to the city of Chemnitz, where it is formed by the smaller rivers Zwönitz and Würschnitz. It joins the Zwickauer Mulde near Wechselburg, south of Rochlitz and has a total length of 75 km (47 mi).

On 22 June 1930, a bridge over the Chemnitz River collapsed, plunging 200 spectators who had been crowding on the bridge into the water and injuring 90 of them.

== Gallery ==
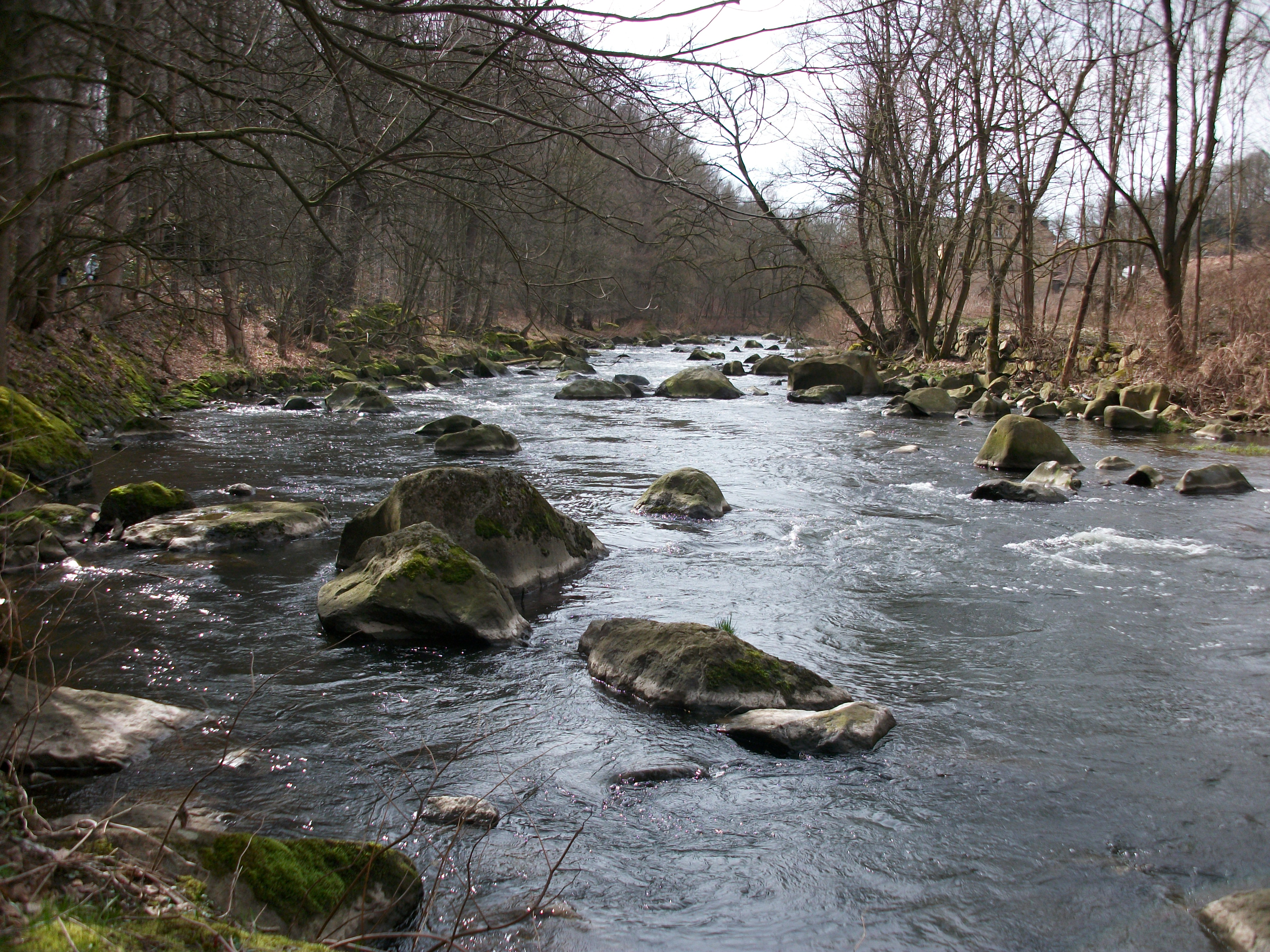
Chemnitz river at Schweizerthal in March 2016

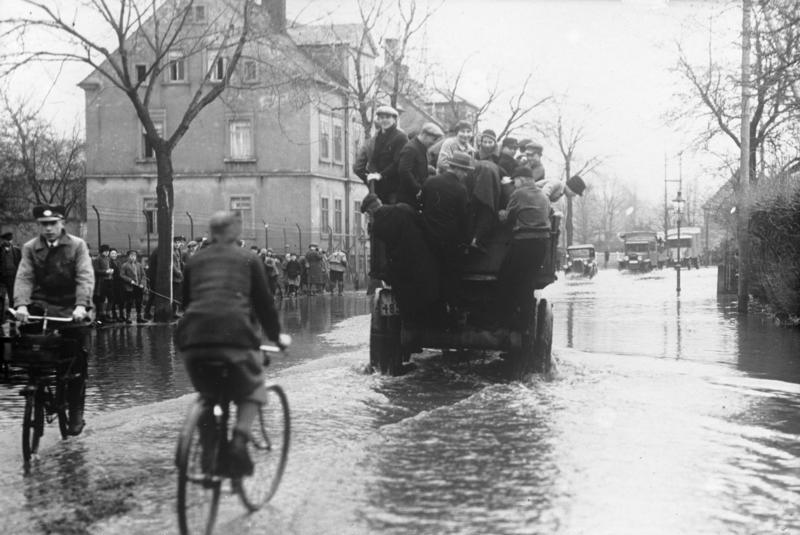
Flood of the Chemnitz in Chemnitz-Furth, January 1932

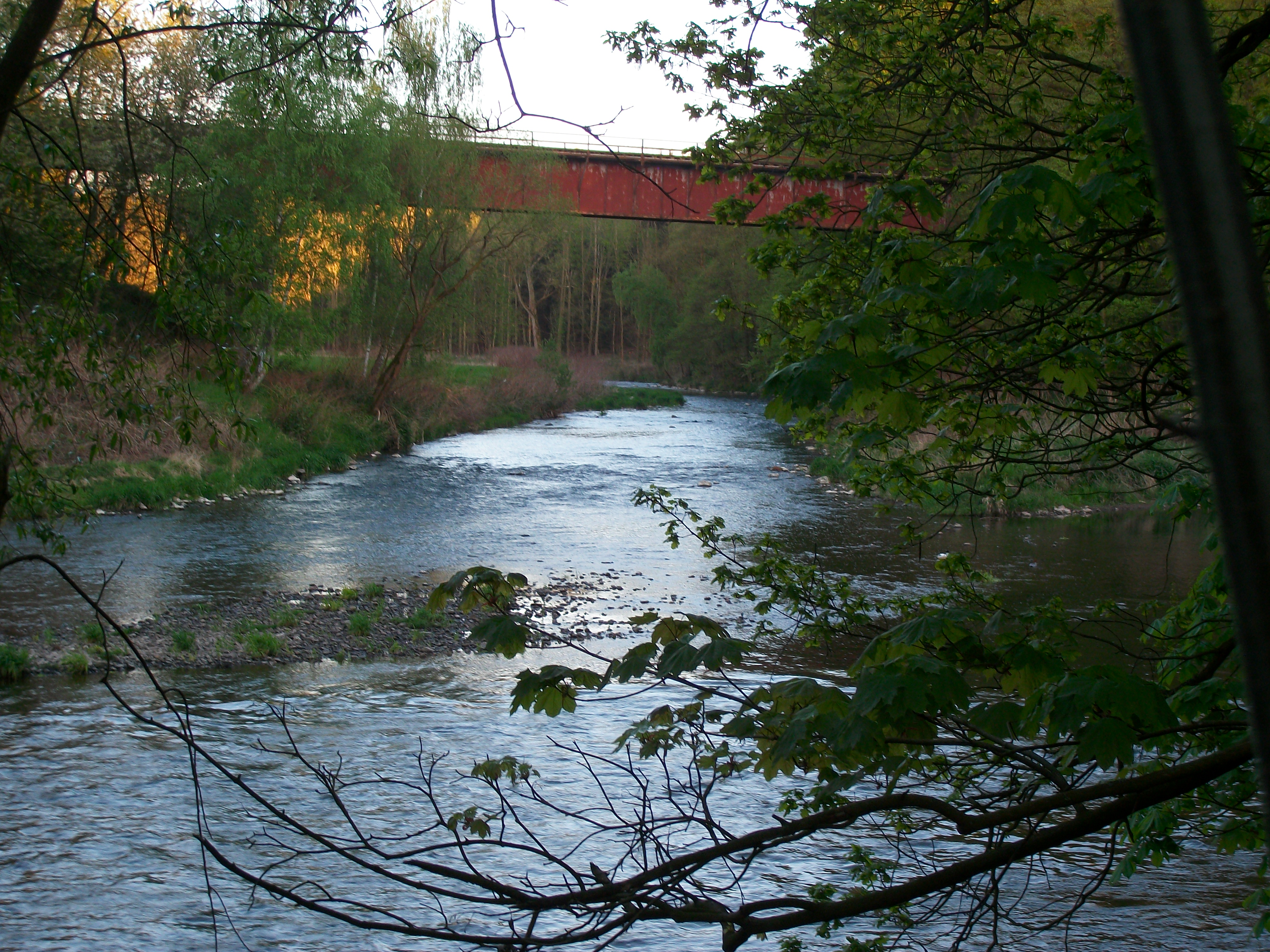
Mouth of the Chemnitz near the bridge Muldentalbahn at Wechselburg in May 2016

== See also ==
- List of rivers of Saxony
