= Stein Castle (Saxony) =

Castle

- Burg Stein, Schloss Stein
- Hartenstein
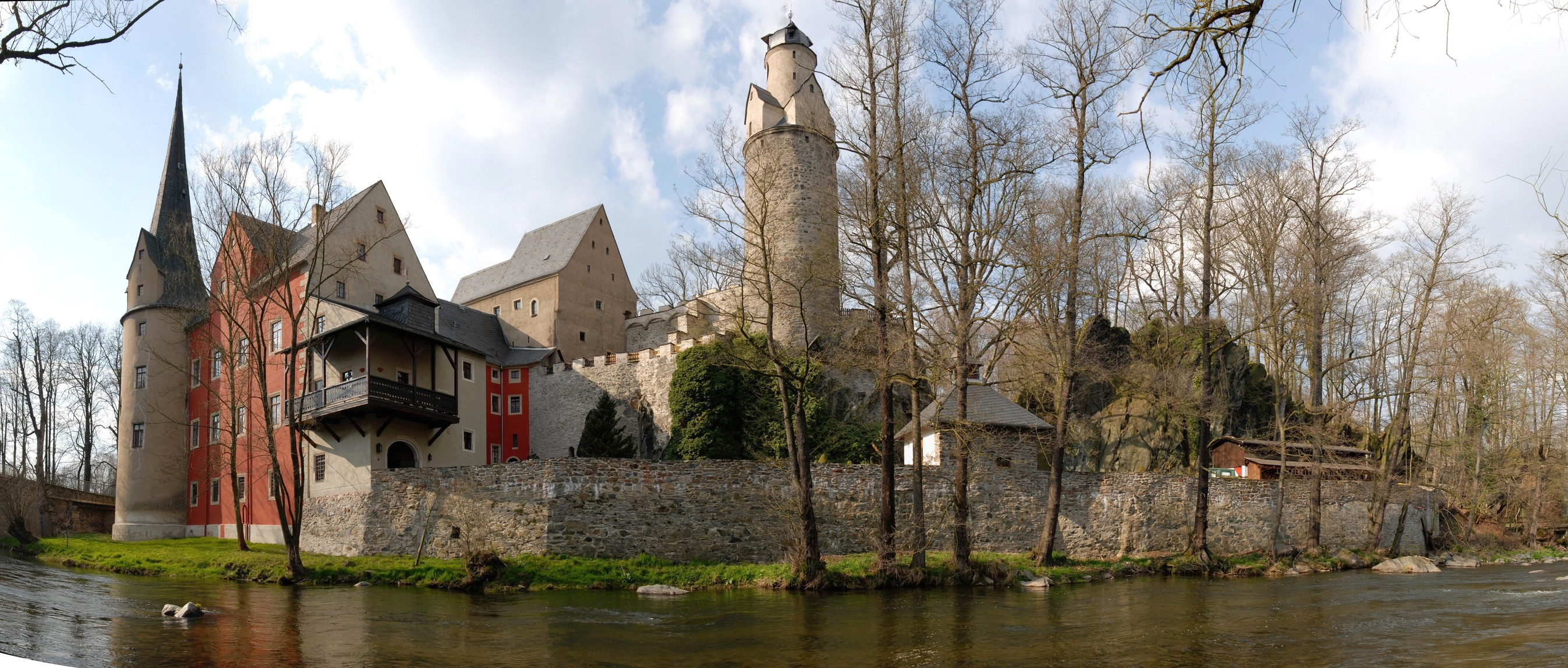
- Stein Castle from the south

Site information
- Type: lowland castle
- Code: DE-SN
- Condition: preserved or largely preserved

Location
- Coordinates: 50°39′6″N 12°39′42″E

Site history
- Built: ca. 1200

Stein Castle (German: Burg Stein or Burg und Schloss Stein) is a Saxon castle located southeast of Zwickau in the village of Stein in the municipality of Hartenstein on the rocky banks of the Zwickauer Mulde in the east German state of Saxony.

== Location ==
Just above the castle is a weir on the River Mulde. The impounded river drove a mill with four large water wheels. In 1788 its milling rights (Mahlzwang) were transferred from an older mill to this one. As a result of its exclusive milling rights, several mill tracks led to Stein. In 1912 the construction of a stately home, Wolfsbrunn House (Schloss Wolfsbrunn), began on the opposite bank of the river. The ruins of Isenburg castle are located only two kilometres upstream. Towards Langenbach were once the villages of Ober- and Niederopritz, which used to belong to Stein Castle, but were probably destroyed during the Hussite Wars.

== History ==
The settlement of the Ore Mountains began in the 12th/13th centuries, especially along the rivers. River crossings and religious orders (Niederlassungen) were protected by fortified sites. Along the Zwickauer Mulde river, numerous castles were built.

=== Construction and layout ===
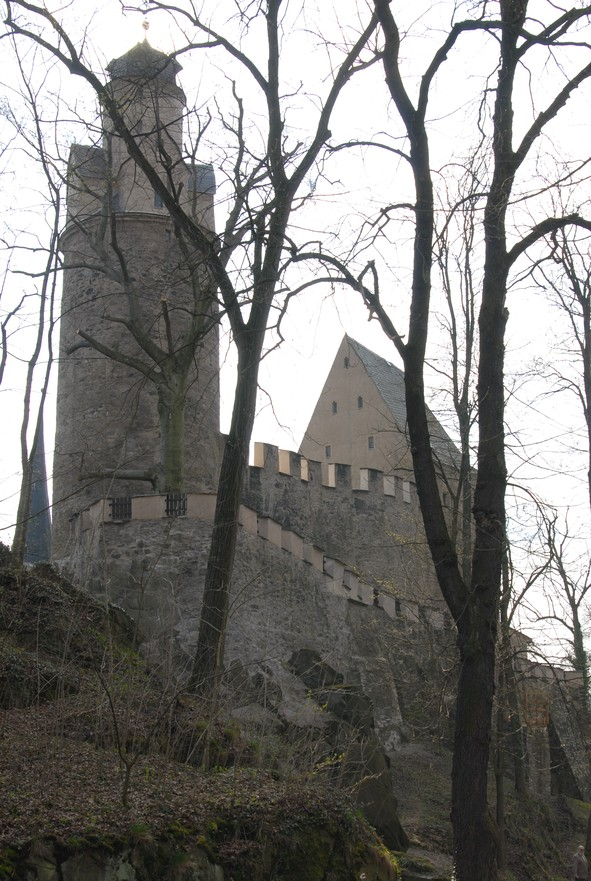
The upper ward, seen from the north

Construction of the castle was probably started around 1200 on a rock made of hornblende right on the southern banks of the Mulde. This oldest part of the site form the upper ward (Oberburg) today, consisting of a round bergfried, a palas, with its great hall, and defensive walls. Its architecture still has Romanesque influences. The fortifications probably also served as an outer ward of Hartenstein Castle which had not at that time been converted into a stately residence or schloss.

The remaining elements of the building are younger. The pointed round tower in the southwest may have been erected in the 14th century; the other parts of the lower ward (Niederburg) at the end of the 15th century. The bergfried of the upper ward were enhanced in the 16th century by an additional storey (Aufbau).

There used to be a ford by the castle and, later, a ferry as well as various wooden and stone bridges, some of which, in old drawings, are portrayed as covered. A bridge toll was still charged until 1924. A more modern steel arch bridge (Stahlbogenbrücke) was blown up in 1945 by the SS; since 1950 there has been a concrete bridge on the site. The predecessor of the old Stein Castle is located on the steep northern banks of the Zwickauer Mulde above the station.

Northwest of the castle lies the remains of another very clearly visible fortification with a round mound (diameter ca. 30 metres), inner ditch (10 to 12 metres wide, 2 metres deep), rampart (ca. 5 m to 8 metres wide) and an outer ditch. On the steep slope towards the south-southwest the ditches do not run at the same depth and width. The site was mostly referred to as a motte-and-bailey castle (Turmhügelburg) and the predecessor to Stein Castle, and was sometimes referred to as Ur-Stein ("Ancient Stein"). More recent research discovered, however, that it is the remains of a medieval siegeworks.

=== Vassals ===
In 1233 the castle was mentioned in the records for the first time: like the entire County of Hartenstein it came under the suzerainty of the burgraves of Meissen. Lord Heidenreich of Grünhain (Heidenricus miles de lapide, lapide meaning "rock castle") is its first known owner and he was the member of a family of the lesser nobility. The farming villages of Langenbach and Wildbach were bound by socage service.

The castellans (Burgherren) of the 14th century were notorious robber barons. One in particular, a certain Conradus de lapide, is accused in a 1320 document of numerous misdeeds. From 1406 the Schönburgs and their vassals were enfeoffed with the castle. The best known story by far revolves around Kunz von Kaufungen and the Kidnapping of the Saxon Princes in 1455: Kunz is described as a worthy and righteous knight. However, he felt unfairly treated by his lord, Elector Frederick the Gentle and wanted compensation. So he kidnapped the children of the Elector, the princes Ernest and Albert with the help of two accomplices. Prince Ernest was hidden in a nearby cave, subsequently called the Prince's Cave.

Kunz was caught and then beheaded in Freiburg on 14 July 1455.

In 1525 – at the time of the Great Peasants' Revolt – the castle was besieged by its socage farmers. The farmers took advantage of the absence of their socage lord, Ernest II of Schönburg. When he returned, however, with his troops from the Battle of Frankenhausen, the siege came to an abrupt end. The farmers were severely punished and many were executed.

When the Barony of Stein became independent of the County of Hartenstein the castle became a lordly residence in 1701/1702. In 1732 a great fire destroyed the lower ward, which was partially rebuilt and subsequently renovated in 1846.

=== Recent history ===
The castle was owned by the aristocratic family of the Princes of Schönburg until their estate was confiscated in 1945 as part of the socialist land reform in East Germany. Since 1954 it has housed a castle and local history museum. In the newer part of the lower ward a convalescent home was established.

In 1996, following German reunification the castle and surrounding Poppen Forest were reprivatized and the castle was renovated after prince Alfred of Schönburg-Hartenstein (b. 1953) bought it back. It is, however, still partly accessible to the public and still houses a museum.

=== Barony of Stein ===
The Barony of Stein became independent of the County of Hartenstein in 1701/1702, when the castle became the seat of the barony. The barony contained the following villages:

- Stein Castle and the present day village of Stein in the borough of Hartenstein
- the village of Wildbach in the municipality of Bad Schlema with the castle of Isenburg, destroyed in 1320
- the present day villages of Langenbach and Fährbrücke (founded in the 19th century) in the municipality of Langenweißbach
- the two abandoned villages of Nieder- and Ober-Opritz between Stein and Langenbach

In 1740 the House of Wettin agreed a recess with the lords of Schönburg, by which the Schönburgs had to recognise the suzerainty of the Saxon royal house over the hitherto imperially immediate baronies of Waldenburg, Glauchau, Lichtenstein, Hartenstein (the lesser county) and Stein. The five recess lordship remained under Schönburg rule until 1878. Thereafter they were fully integrated into the Kingdom of Saxony. The Barony of Stein and the lesser County of Hartenstein (without the district of Lößnitz) went to the Amtshauptmannschaft of Zwickau.

== Literature ==
- Museum Burg Stein (pub.): Die Burg Stein bei Hartenstein und ihre Umgebung. Schneeberg, 1993
