= Kunz von Kaufungen =

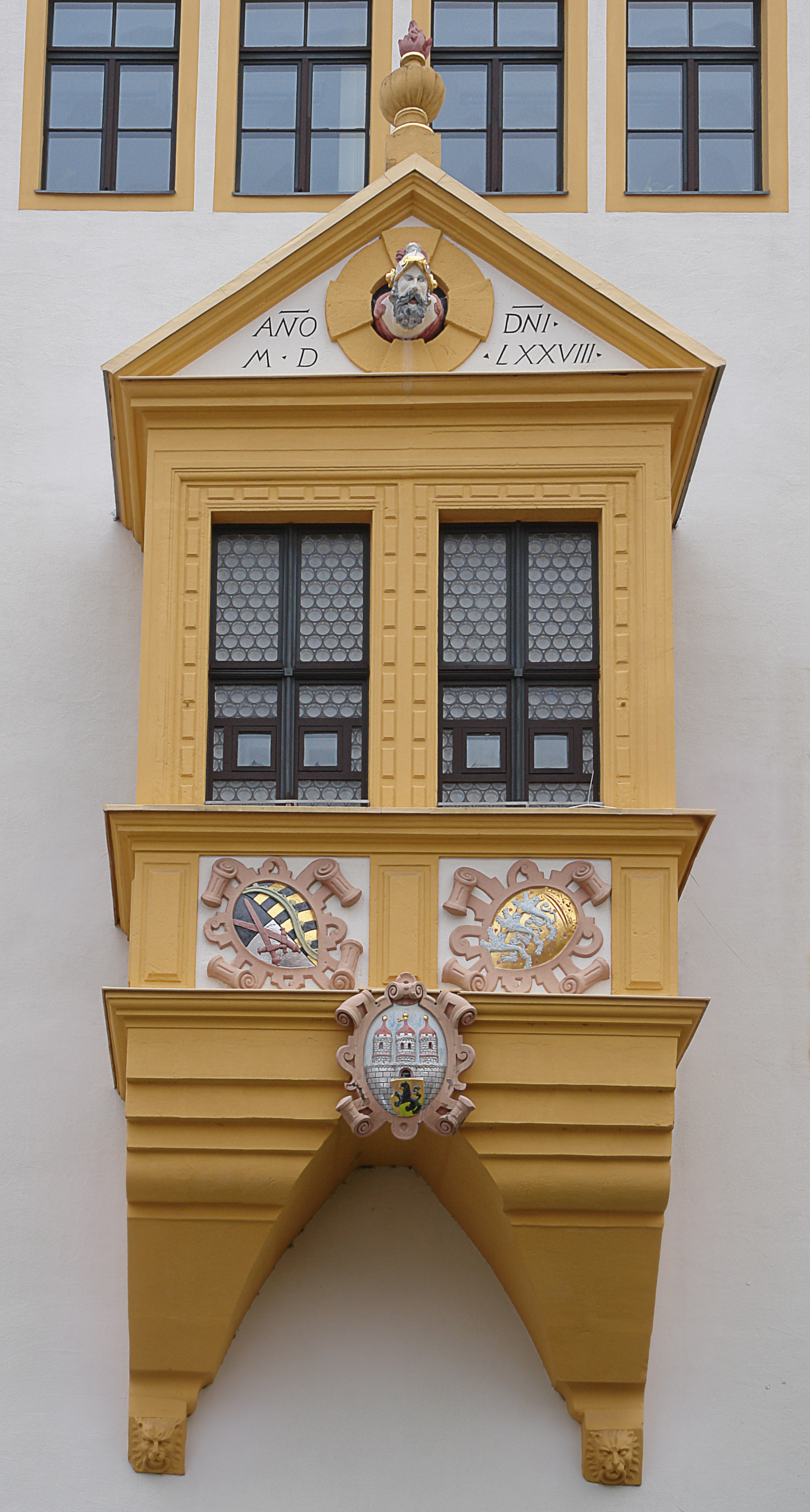
A bay window on Freiberg's city hall displaying the head of Kunz von Kaufungen

Kunz von Kaufungen (also known as Conrad von Kaufungen, or Kunz von Kauffungen; c. 1410 – 14 July 1455) was a German knight and military commander. A veteran of the Hussite wars, he also fought for Frederick II, Elector of Saxony against Frederick's brother Duke William III during the Saxon Fratricidal War (1446–1451). Afterwards, Kunz was not repaid or recognized for his services and loss of property during the war, and eventually during the Prinzenraub (English: "The stealing of the princes") he kidnapped Frederick II's two sons. He was caught and later executed.

== Background ==
Kunz von Kaufungen was a knight who lived in the tower of Kaufungen located near modern-day Limbach-Oberfrohna. Kunz was known for defeating and holding for ransom Albert III, Elector of Brandenburg, one of the best fighters of the time. Kunz also fought in the Hussite wars.

== Relationship with Frederick II, Elector of Saxony ==
=== Saxon Fratricidal War ===
The Saxon Fratricidal War first broke out between Frederick II, Elector of Saxony and Duke William III in 1446 when they were unable to resolve their dispute in the Division of Altenburg. Frederick proved stronger, and William brought in forces from Bohemia, including Hussites. Frederick's forces were led by various commanders and captains, including Kunz von Kaufungen. Kunz won a victory at Gera while commanding Frederick's forces and occupied the small town, and in return William's forces and Bohemian allies pillaged the area around Kaufungen. Kunz had much of his property destroyed, was captured by Bohemian forces, and forced to pay 4,000 golden gulden for his freedom, a very large sum for the time. Neither side could gain a decisive advantage and the war dragged on for five years of "ruinous confusion" before ending on 27 January 1451, when a peace was reached at Naumburg.

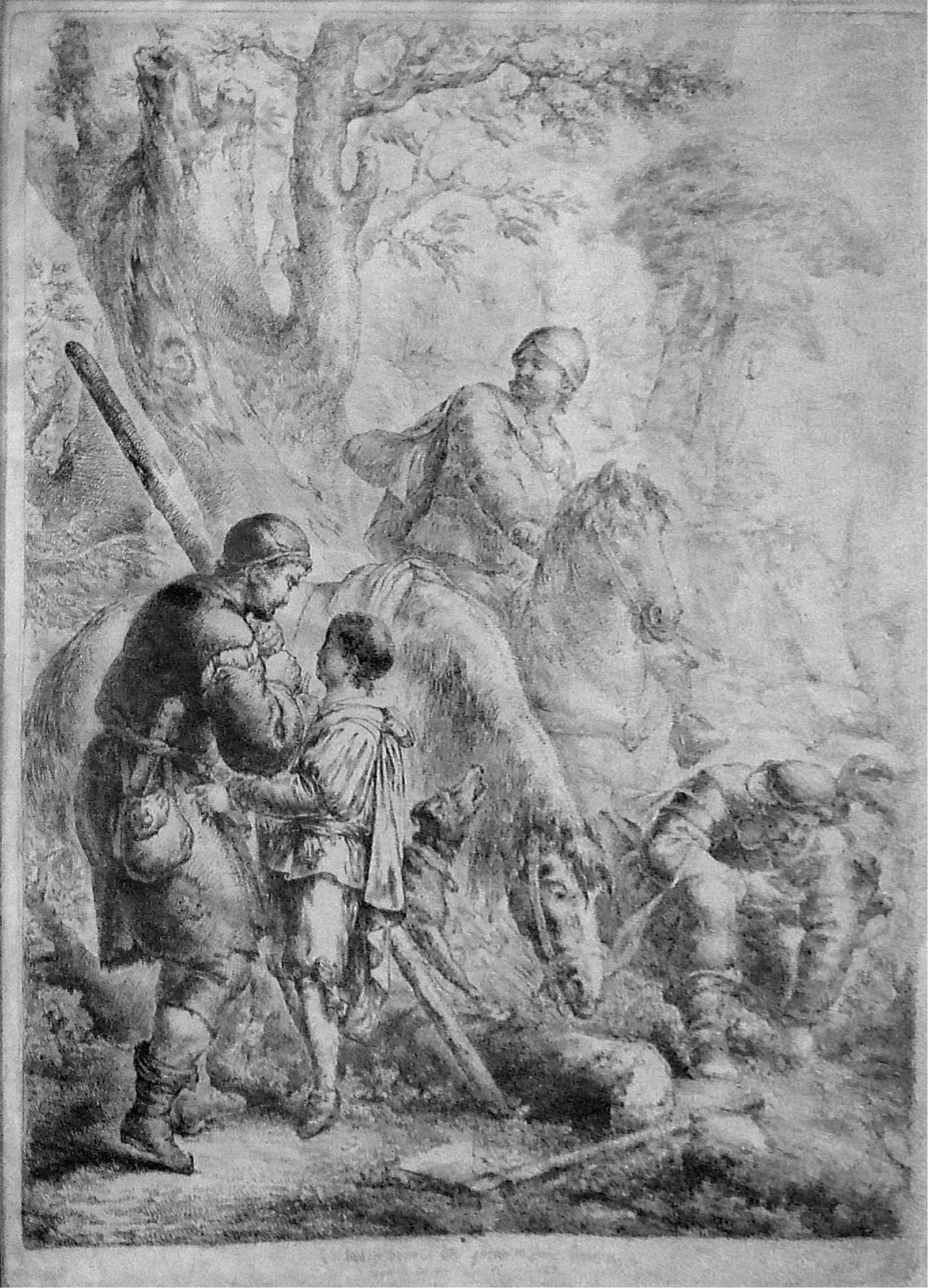
The Collier Defends the Saxon Prince against His Kidnapper, Kuntz von Kauffungen (engraving by Bernhard Rode, 1781)

=== The Prinzenraub ===
After the war, Kunz von Kaufungen expected to be repaid by Frederick II for his massive losses. Frederick II was also in financial difficulties, so did not repay the damages or the ransom Kunz had paid to the Bohemians, arguing that Kunz was just a hired soldier, thus he was not bound to make good his losses. Frederick eventually agreed to bring in arbitrators to settle the case, but Kunz, seeing that he would be disappointed in his efforts to find justice in this way, withdrew from the procedure before hearing the verdict. Kunz continued to complain and insult Frederick until Frederick banished him from his land.

Kunz went to Bohemia and lived in the castle of Isenburg until, on 7 July 1455, Kunz kidnapped Frederick's two sons, Ernest and Albert, from the castle of Altenburg in what was called the Prinzenraub (English: "The stealing of the princes"). Since Kunz never got to a position where he could demand ransom payments, it was presented that he planned and executed this desperate measure as revenge against Frederick II. Prince Albert was rescued on the same night as the kidnapping, when Kunz was overwhelmed and captured by a charcoal burner. Prince Ernst was released four days later when Kunz's accomplices released him in exchange for pardons. On 14 July 1455 Kunz von Kaufungen was beheaded by order of Frederick at the marketplace of Freiberg.
