= Treaty of Eger =

1459 treaty between Saxony and Bohemia

Hauptvergleich von Eger (de) Chebský mír (cs)
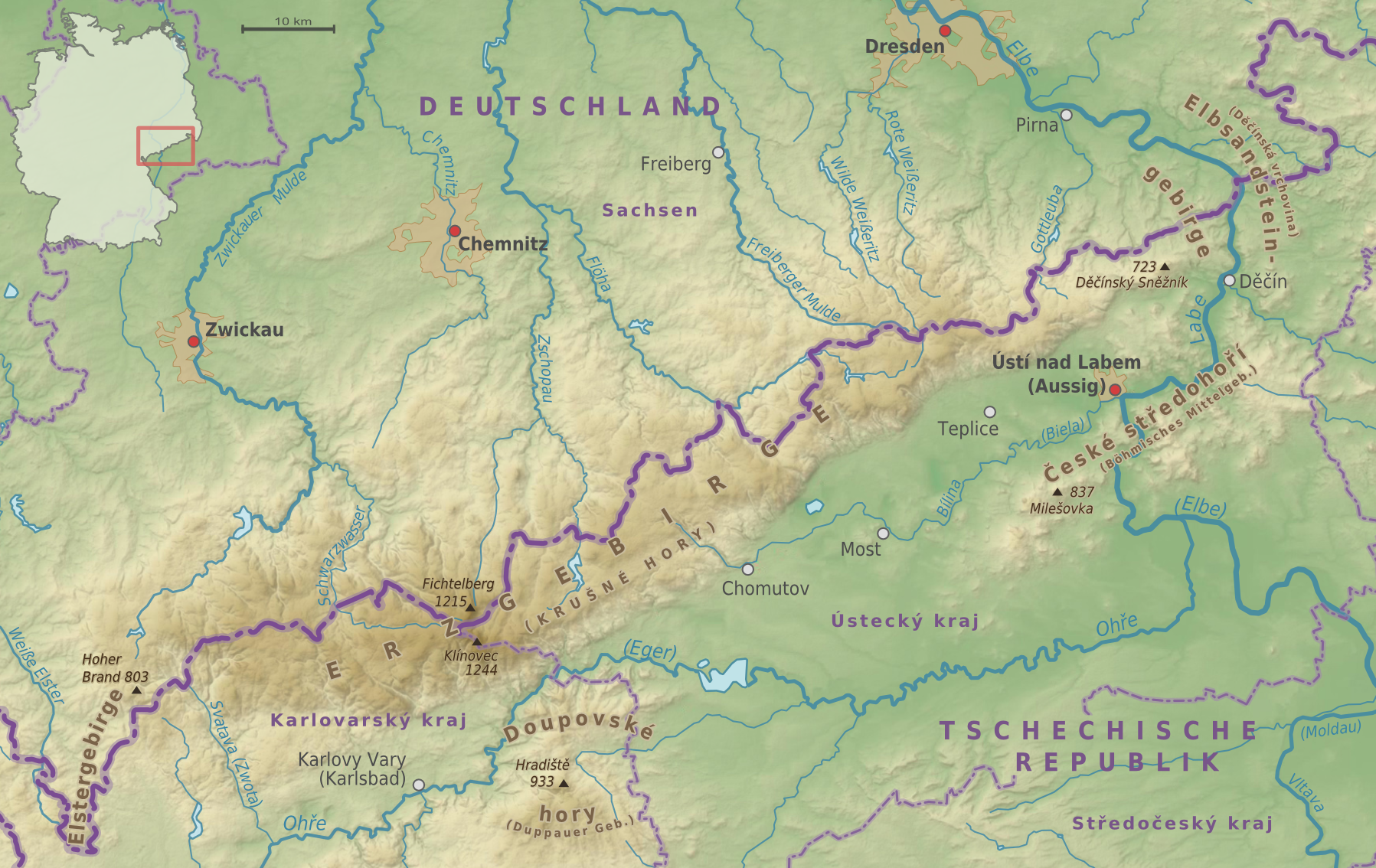
- Ore Mountains with present Czech–German border
- Signed: 25 April 1459
- Location: Eger (Cheb), Egerland
- Signatories: Electorate of Saxony; Kingdom of Bohemia

The Treaty of Eger (German: Vertrag von Eger), also called Main Compromise of Eger (Hauptvergleich von Eger) or Peace of Eger (Czech: Chebský mír) was concluded on 25 April 1459 in the Imperial City of Eger (Cheb), administrative seat of the immediate pawn of Egerland (Reichspfandschaft Eger). The treaty established the border between the Kingdom of Bohemia and the Electorate of Saxony on the main ridge of the Ore Mountains stretching from Eger to the River Elbe. The border remains largely unchanged up to today, separating the Czech Republic and Germany, and is thus one of the oldest still extant borders in Europe.

== Background ==
At that time, the Wettin elector Frederick II of Saxony and his brother Landgrave William of Thuringia had re-arranged their dominions in the 1445 Division of Altenburg and the following Saxon Fratricidal War. In 1432 Frederick had already reached a separate peace agreement with the Bohemian Hussites.

After the death of the Habsburg king Albert II of Germany, the Utraquist leader George of Poděbrady had been elected Bohemian regent by local nobles in 1448 against the resistance of the Catholic supporters of Albert's minor son and heir Ladislaus the Posthumous, led by Burgrave Meinhard of Neuhaus. In the Saxon Fratricidal War, George had backed the younger brother Landgrave William. After the sudden death of Ladislaus, he was crowned Bohemian king by the Utraquist nobility in 1458, while William had also been a candidate for the succession.

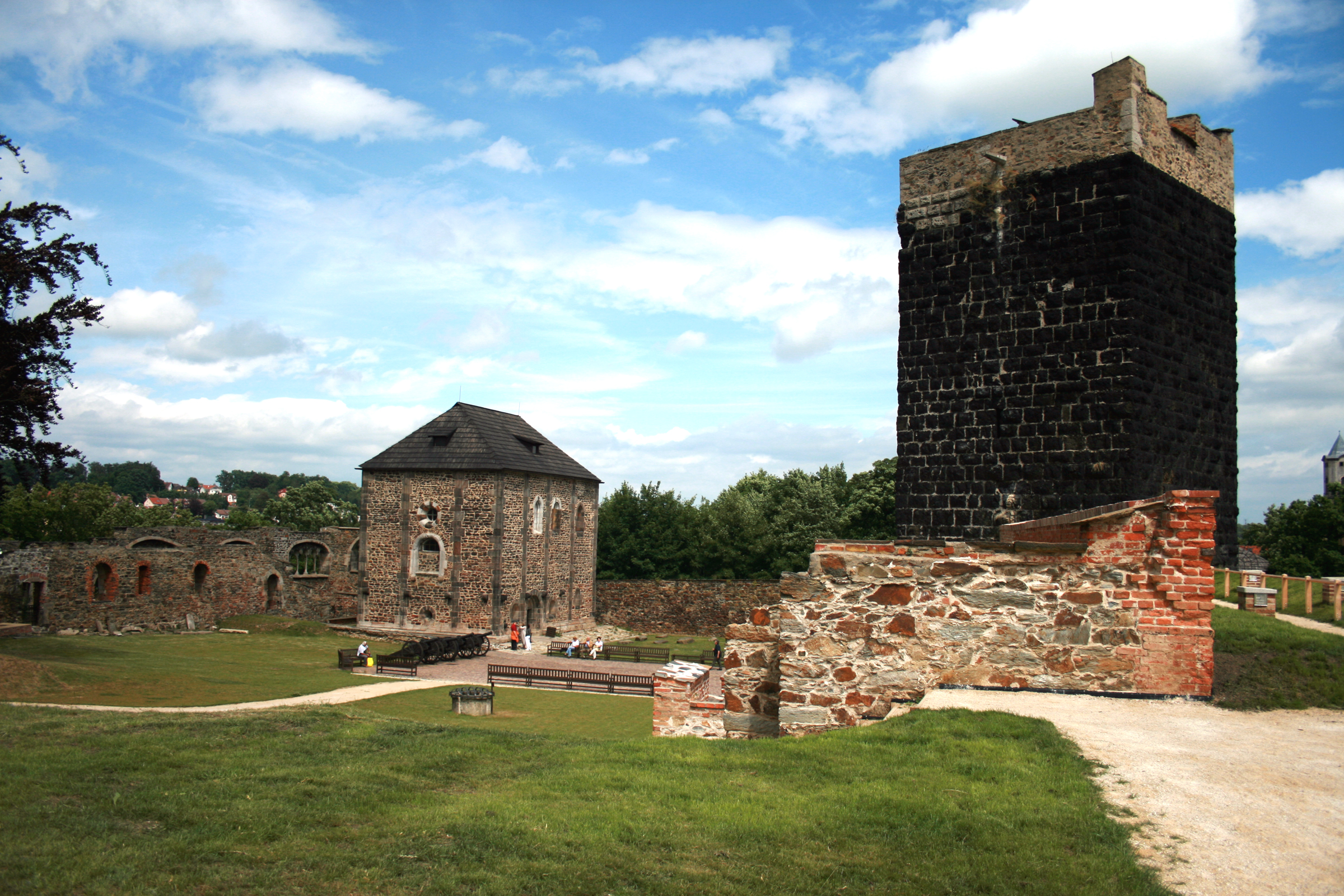
Ruins of Cheb Castle

== Agreement ==
In 1459 the Wettin brothers agreed with George of Poděbrady that towns, castles, markets and villages south of the Ore Mountains that formerly had belonged to the Lands of the Bohemian Crown (like Most, Rýzmburk Castle at Osek and Duchcov) together with all spiritual and secular bodies, pensions, interest, duties, etc. belonged to the estates of King George, and the estates and castles on the northern side in the Vogtland region and the former Margraviate of Meissen should be left with the Saxon electors. Through the agreement, the constant border disputes ultimately ended, but some places and dominions north of the Ore Mountains continued to be fiefdoms of the Bohemian crown.

== Aftermath ==
Upon the death of Elector Frederick II in 1464, his eldest son Ernest ruled jointly with his younger brother Albert. Their realm comprised all Wettin lands, when their uncle Landgrave William of Thuringia died without male heirs in 1482. However, by the 1485 Treaty of Leipzig the brothers again divided the Saxon lands, with the western Thuringia and Vogtland regions passing to Ernest and eastern Meissen falling to Albert. George of Poděbrady had to face the continuous resistance of the Catholic nobility backed by Pope Paul II, who designated Matthias Corvinus Bohemian king in 1469.

The most significant change to the border fixed by the 1459 treaty happened in 1546, when Duke Maurice of Saxony and King Ferdinand I divided the Barony of Schwarzenberg, former possession of Elector John Frederick I, as part of the spoils of war following the Schmalkaldic War, with Boží Dar and Horní Blatná passing to Bohemia.

== See also ==
- Czech Republic–Germany border
- Czech Republic–Germany relations

== Literature ==
- Erich Berlet: Die sächsisch-böhmische Grenze im Erzgebirge. Oldecop's Erben (Stockmar), Oschatz 1900 (Digitalised)
- Sven Rabeler, Alexandra Kursawe und Claudia Ulrich (Bearbeiter): Briefe der Herzogin Sidonia von Sachsen (1449–1510) an ihren Sohn Georg (1471–1539), Mitteilungen der Residenzen-Kommission der Akademie der Wissenschaften zu Göttingen, Sonderheft 11, Kiel 2009, ISSN 1617-7312
- Richard Schmidt (December 1942), Gebirgsvereinsverband Sudetenland-West (ed.), "Die Landesgrenze zwischen der Farbleite und dem Sonnenwirbel – ein Zeuge bedeutungsvoller Obererzgebirgischer Heimatgeschichte", Erzgebirgs-Zeitung. Monatsschrift für Volkskunde und Heimatforschung, Wanderpflege und Fremdenverkehr (in German), vol. 11. und 12. Heft des 63. Jahrgangs, Teplitz-Schönau, pp. 81–87
