= Isenburg (Saxony) =

- Hartenstein and Wildbach
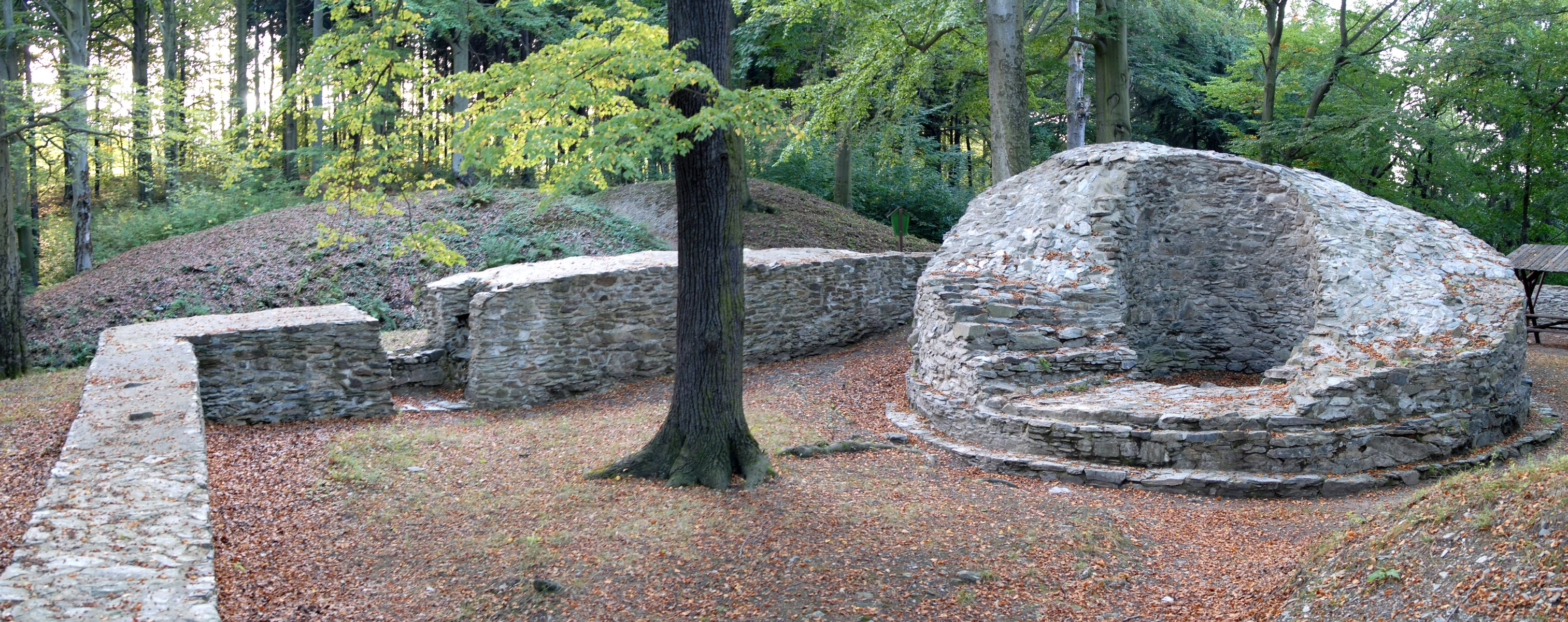
- Ruins of the Isenburg with its bergfried

Site information
- Type: hill castle, spur castle
- Code: DE-SN
- Condition: ruin

Location
- Coordinates: 50°38′2″N 12°40′26″E

Site history
- Built: 12th century

The Isenburg (German pronunciation: [ˈiːzn̩bʊʁk]) is a ruined castle in the Western Ore Mountains between Hartenstein and the village of Wildbach in the town of Aue-Bad Schlema. It sits high above the valley of the Zwickauer Mulde in Saxony.

== History ==
In the course of the settlement of the Ore Mountains, a fortifications was built on a rocky spur above the confluence of the Wildbach stream and the river Mulde. Archaeological finds indicate that this site already existed in the 12th century. The name "Isenburg" goes back to the name Vas and indicates either iron mining, which took place in the vicinity (see also: Bad Schlema Show Mine), or it meant "iron" in the sense of "impregnable".

Little is known about the history of spur castle and its violent destruction. There are no verified, documented references. Oral traditions - the first account dates to 1738 - called the Isenburg a "robber castle," the "Old Castle" (Altes Schloss) and the "Iron Castle" (Eisenburg), from which its present name is derived. But there are no medieval sources. The castle had been destroyed by the 14th century and was never rebuilt. Its ruins were probably used from the 15th to 17th centuries as shelters for the local population during times of conflict. Around 1750, the remains of the castle were demolished to build the stone church in Wildbach.

In 1934 the remains of the ramparts were exposed by the Reich Labour Service. The foundations of the ramparts and the remains of the round bergfried were restored in 1993.

== Design ==
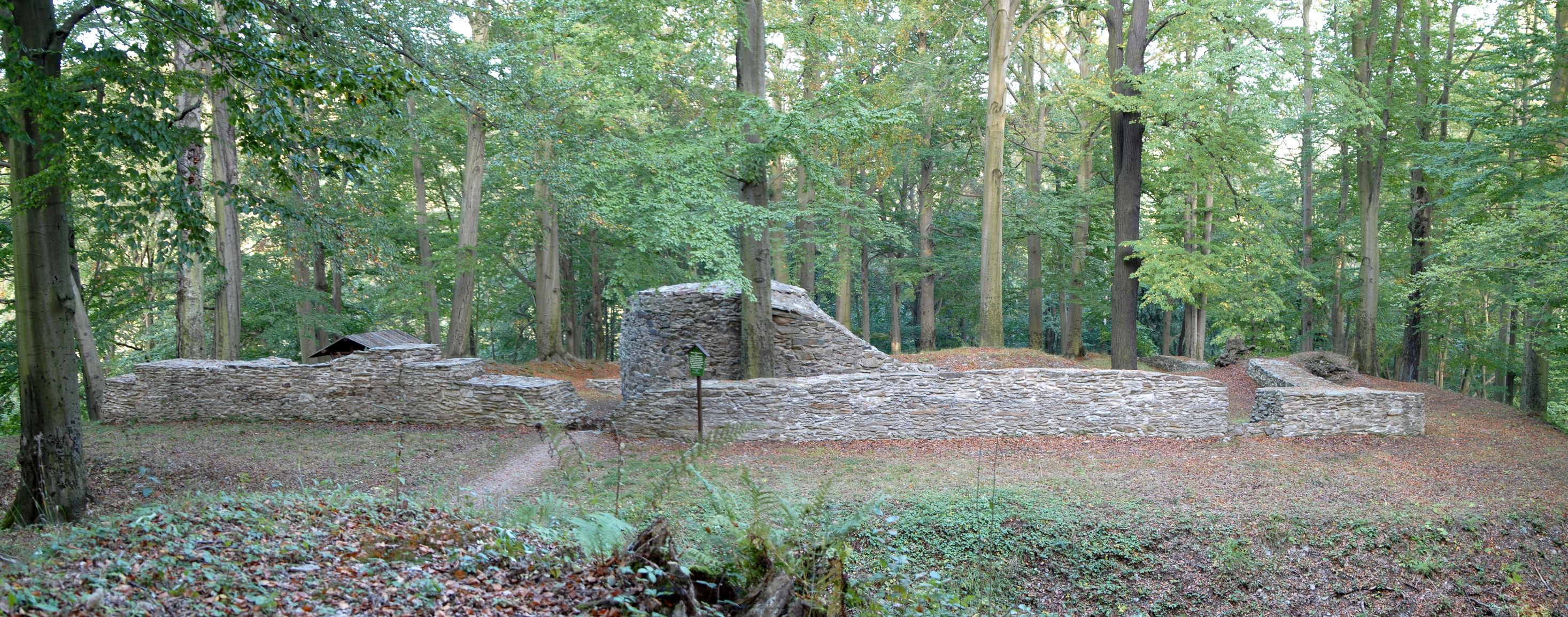
Western view

An outer, lower and upper bailey can be made out and there was also a cistern. The site covers an area of 51 x 33 metres, the tower has a diameter at its base of about 9 metres and a wall thickness of 3 metres. The only easily accessible, western, side of the castle was also protected by a ditch. The inner and outer shell is made of horizontal layers of brick, whilst the core is lined with cut stone laid in a herringbone pattern (opus spicatum).

== Access ==
The recommended way to visit the castle ruins is by foot from Hartenstein railway station which takes about 30 minutes. Only about 200 metres from the station is Stein Castle. At this spot the route crosses the Zwickauer Mulde river to a point immediately below Schloss Wolfsbrunn. Here the route turns left and winds through the Poppenwald upstream and parallel to the Mulde. After a short, but steep, climb known as "Gentle Henry" (Sanfter Heinrich), the path forks. Keeping right, the route passes the Wildbach Church on an easy forest path. Here there are signs to the ruins which are another 700 metres further on.

The left-hand fork leads via a wild and romantic narrow path on top of the river bank of the Mulde to the same destination. This path is called the "Raubrittersteig" ("Robber Baron Climb") and is one of the most attractive walks in the Mulde Valley.

Very close to the Isenburg, but on the opposite bank of the Mulde, is the Prince's Cave. The path continues further upstream towards Bad Schlema where a radium spring is reached after about 1 kilometre.

== Literature ==
- Matthias Donath: Schlösser im westlichen Erzgebirge, Meissen, 2010, pp.57 ff.
