= Saxon Fratricidal War =

Military conflict

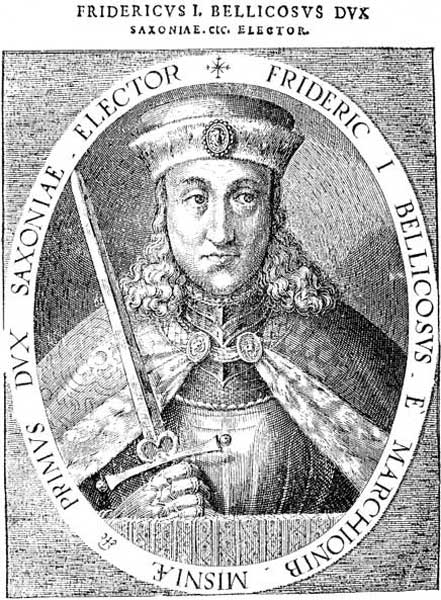
Frederick I, Elector of Saxony, father of the two warring brothers

The Saxon Fratricidal War (German: Sächsischer Bruderkrieg) was a war fought between the two brothers Frederick II, Elector of Saxony and Duke William III over Wettin ruled areas from 1446 to 1451. After a dispute over the division of certain family lands between Frederick II and William III, the Division of Altenburg eventually led to growing tensions between the two brothers and an inability to agree on who ruled which areas. After failed attempts at reconciliation, the war broke out and lasted for five years. The war was destructive and had no clear winner before being ended with a peace treaty at Naumburg. Following the war and subsequent divisions the Saxons lost much of their former power and influence within the different German states and families.

== Background ==
The House of Wettin and its line of Saxon princes gained a large amount of land over the years mainly through inheritance, including the Landgraviate of Thuringia, the Margraviate of Meissen, the Duchy of Saxony, and the Electorate of Saxony. Frederick I was the Elector of Saxony and Margrave of Meissen and ruled over all of the lands except for the lands in Thuringia. Frederick I's cousin Frederick IV of Thuringia was Landgrave of Thuringia and ruled over those lands. When Frederick I died in 1428, his four sons Frederick II, Sigismund, Heinrich, and William III inherited his lands jointly. Heinrich died in 1435, and in 1440 Sigismund became Bishop of Würzburg and renounced his claims to the land. Frederick, who was the eldest of the two remaining sons, now held the Electorate of Saxony and some land around Wittenberg in his own right, whilst throughout the remainder of the land he ruled together with William. This continued without serious incident for twelve years until, in 1440, Frederick IV of Thuringia died childless, and the two brothers inherited extensive land within Thuringia as well as the title of Landgrave of Thuringia.

The division of this new land in Thuringia could not be agreed upon, and on 16 July 1445 the two remaining brothers tried to partition the land between them in the Division of Altenburg. When Frederick II chose the western part and not the Margraviate of Meissen on 26 September 1445 in Leipzig, William rejected the division. On December 11 of the same year they attempted to reconcile in the monastery of Neuwerk in Halle (Saale) in what was known as the Hallescher Machtspruch (English: the Power Dictum of Halle). The Archbishop of Magdeburg Frederick III of Beichlingen, the Margrave Frederick II of Brandenburg and the Landgrave Ludwig II of Hesse, actively participated as judges, however the two brothers failed to reach a peaceful resolution.

== War ==
War first broke out between Frederick II and William III in 1446 when they were unable to resolve their dispute. Frederick proved stronger, and William brought in forces from Bohemia, including Hussites. Frederick's forces were led by commanders such as Kunz von Kaufungen, a captain from the tower of Kaufungen located near modern day Limbach-Oberfrohna. Frederick's forces under the command of Kunz won a victory at Gera and occupied the small town, however William's forces and Bohemian allies caused a large amount of damage to locations within Kaufungen in return. Kunz himself had much of his property destroyed and was taken captive by Bohemians. Eventually he paid the sum of 4,000 golden gulden for his freedom, which was very extravagant for the time. No side could gain a clear advantage throughout the war and the fighting turned out to be an extended period of "ruinous confusion" for the region. The war lasted five years and ended on 27 January 1451 when a peace was reached at Naumburg. This peace could not reestablish a joint rule, but let the two sides accept a peaceful division of the lands.

== Aftermath ==
After the war, Kunz von Kaufungen expected to be repaid by Frederick II for the massive losses of his property during the fighting. Frederick also had losses of his own and therefore followed the letter of his contract with Kunz and did not even repay the ransom Kunz paid to the Bohemians. Frederick stated that Kunz was just his hired soldier, and he was not bound to protect him or repay his losses. Frederick eventually agreed upon bringing in arbitrators to settle the case, but Kunz left the arbitration before hearing the verdict when he realized it would not reach his expectations. Kunz continued to complain and insult Frederick until Frederick banished him from the lands. Kunz left to Bohemia and lived in the castle of Isenburg. Kunz eventually kidnapped Frederick's two sons, Ernest and Albert, from the castle of Altenburg in what was called the Prinzenraub (English: "The stealing of the princes"). Prince Albert was found that very night when Kunz was caught, while Prince Ernst was released four days later when Kunz's allies released him for a pardon. On 14 July 1455, Kunz von Kaufungen was beheaded by order of Frederick at Freiberg.

The lands fought over during the war were ruled peacefully again, however this time separately instead of jointly. Eventually, Frederick II died, and his two sons Ernest and Albert inherited his lands jointly in 1464. When William III died in 1482, without any sons, they inherited his lands and split them between them by the Treaty of Leipzig in 1485. The division of these lands and this war led to the Saxons losing a large amount of influence within the different German states and no longer being one of the most powerful German houses.
