= Red Mulde =

River in Germany

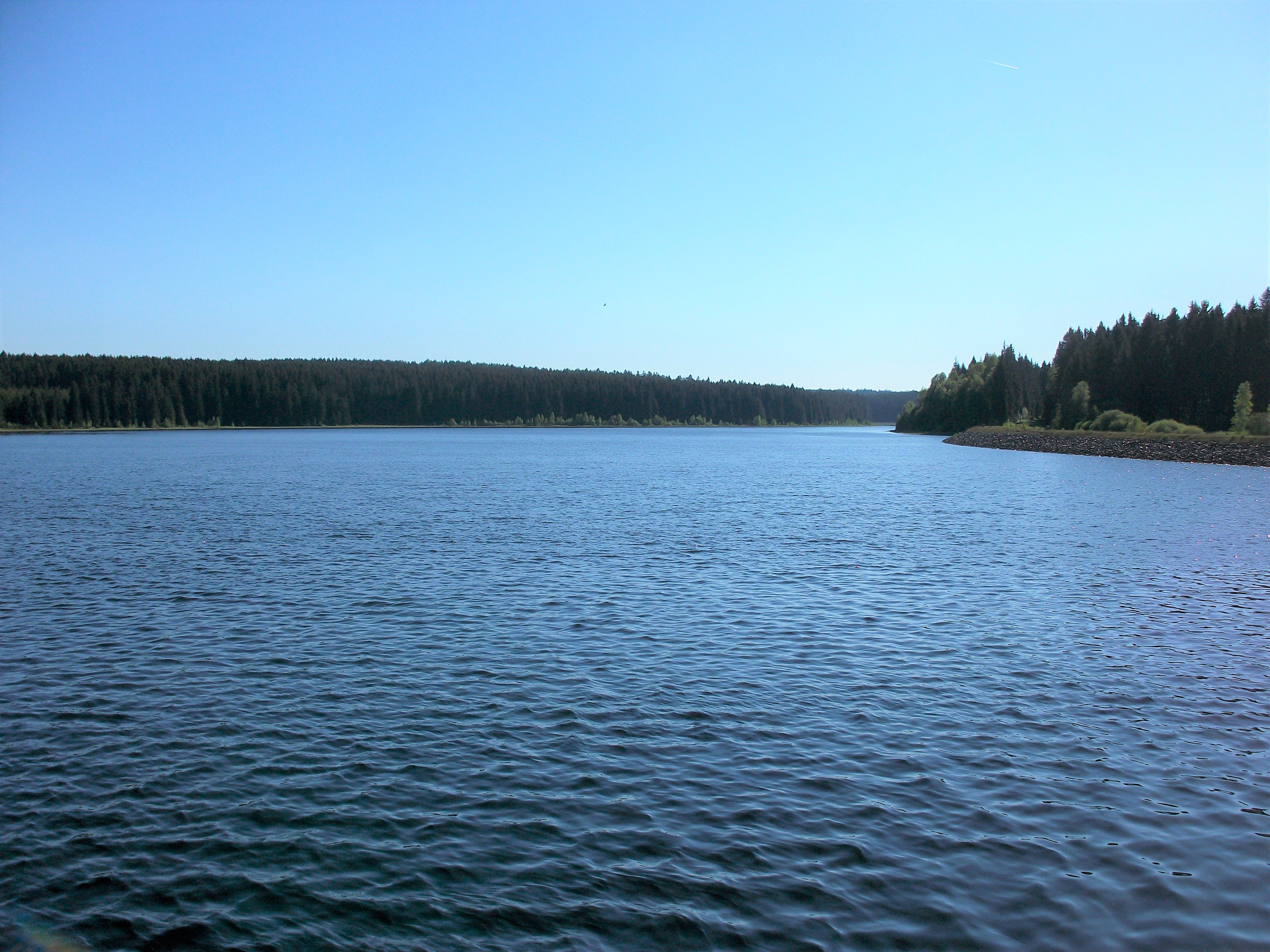
- Native name: Rote Mulde (German)

Location
- Country: Germany
- States: Saxony

Physical characteristics
- Mouth
  - location: Zwickauer Mulde
  - coordinates: 50.405°N 12.386°E

Basin features
- Progression: Zwickauer Mulde→ Mulde→ Elbe→ North Sea

The Red Mulde (German: Rote Mulde) is a river of Saxony, Germany. It flows into the Muldenberg Reservoir, which is drained by the Zwickauer Mulde.

== See also ==
- List of rivers of Saxony
