= Zwönitz (river) =

River in Germany

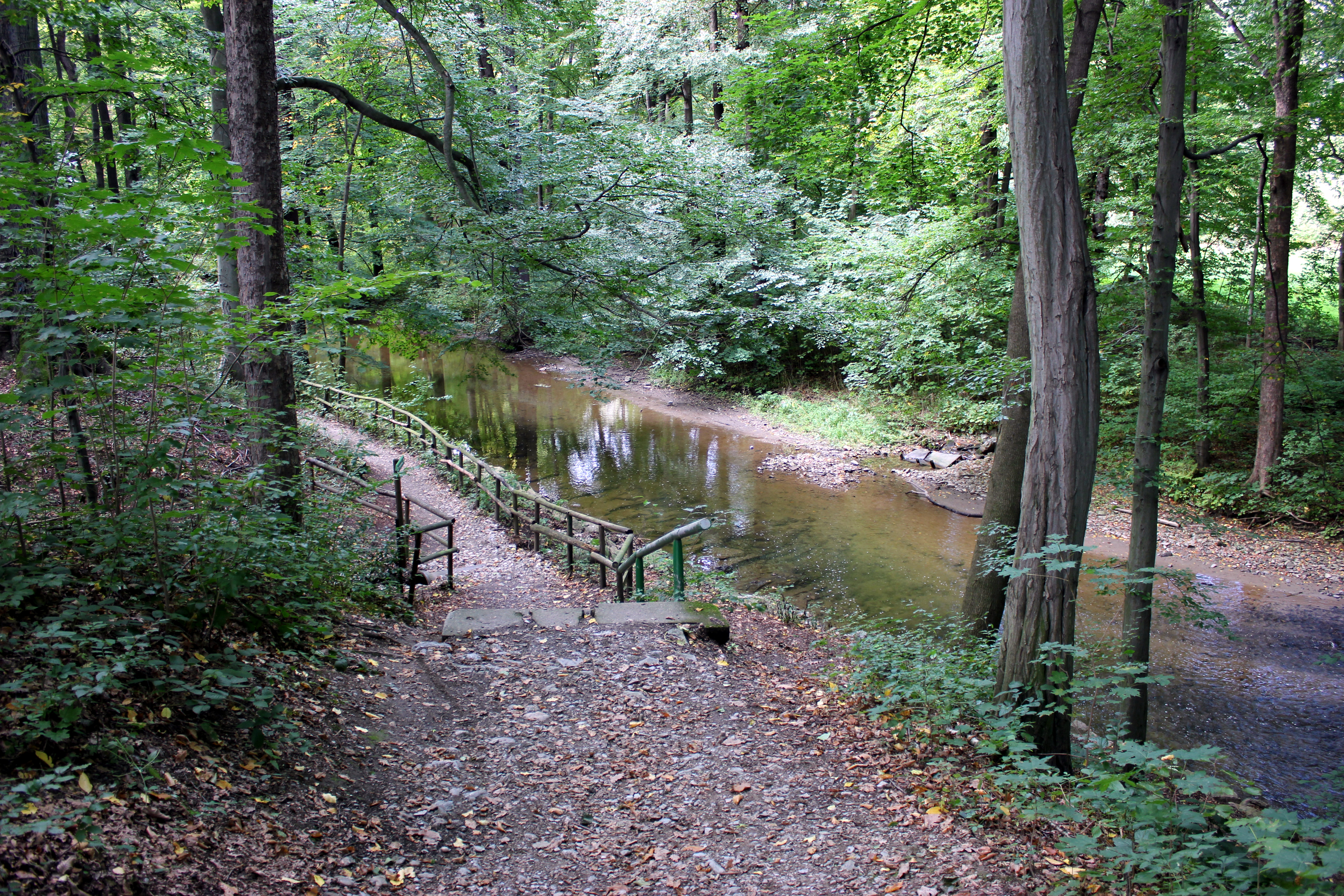
- The river flowing through the nature reserve Wasserwerkpark in Chemnitz

Location
- Country: Germany
- State: Saxony

Physical characteristics
- Mouth
  - location: Chemnitz
  - coordinates: 50.7897°N 12.9239°E

Basin features
- Progression: Chemnitz→ Zwickauer Mulde→ Mulde→ Elbe→ North Sea

The Zwönitz (German pronunciation: [ˈtsvøːnɪts]) is a river in Saxony, Germany, being the right source river of the Chemnitz river, which it joins near the city of Chemnitz.

== See also ==
- List of rivers of Saxony
