= Schloss Wolfsbrunn =

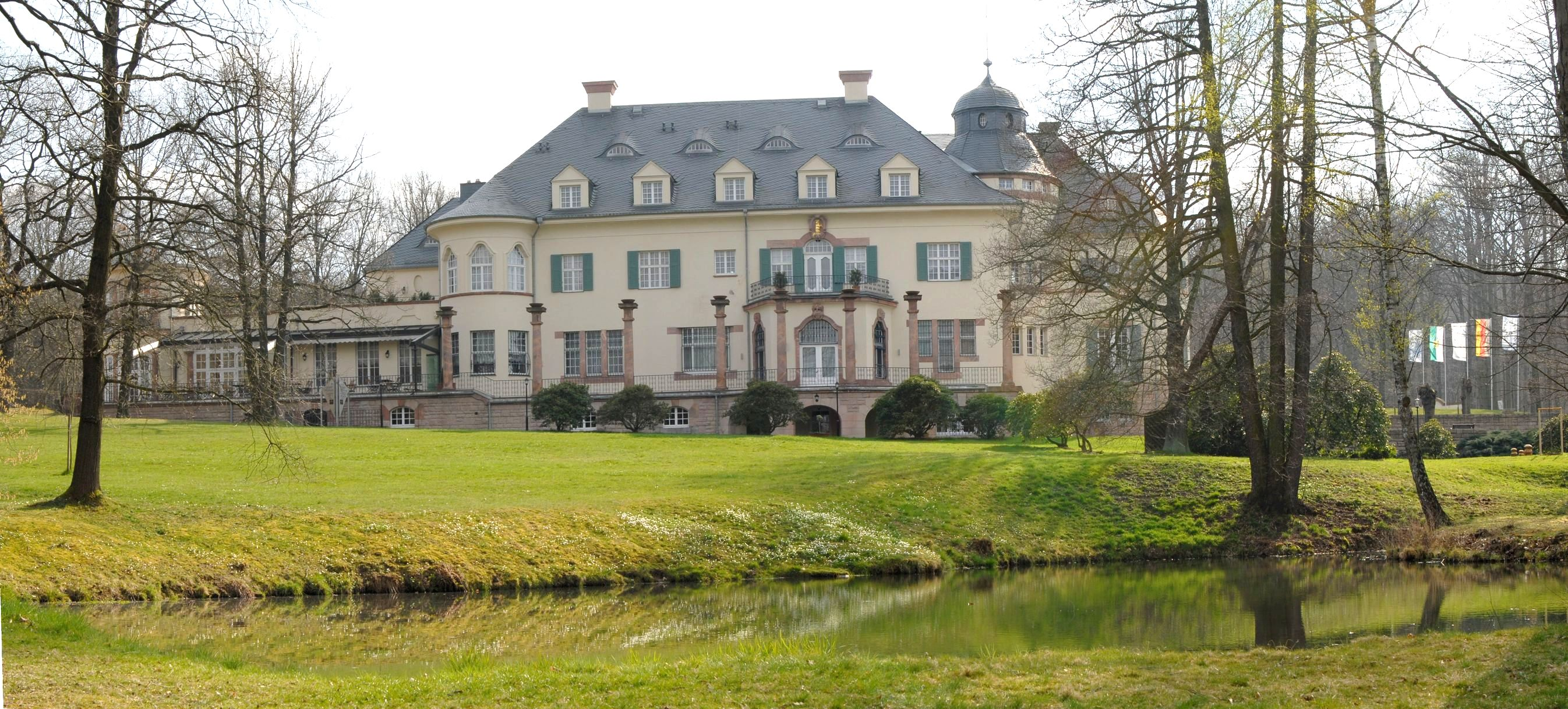

- Location within Germany

General information
- Location: Hartenstein-Stein, Wildbacher Straße, Germany
- Coordinates: 50°38′58.5″N 12°39′38.4″E
- Construction started: 1912

Design and construction
- Architect: Emanuel von Seidl

Schloss Wolfsbrunn is the local name for an imposing hotel building in the village of Stein in the borough of Hartenstein in the south of Zwickau district in the German state of Saxony. It was built in 1911 as the villa of a wealthy mining businessman. Since 1997 it has been owned by the Leonhardt brothers (Leonhardt Group).

== History ==
The villa was built in the years 1911–1913 in the Poppenwald forest not far from Stein Castle and near the river Zwickauer Mulde as a property for the major industrialist and mining businessman, Dr. Karl Georg Wolf. The plans for this Art Nouveau structure were drawn up by Munich architect (Baumeister), Emanuel von Seidl. The interior decor, some of which is still in its original state, was carried out by well known Munich artists. The luxury villa with its L-shaped floor plan is surrounded by 6 hectares of parkland. Here there are several well-kept lawns and a wolf statue in red sandstone by a well, an artistic symbol of the name of the property.

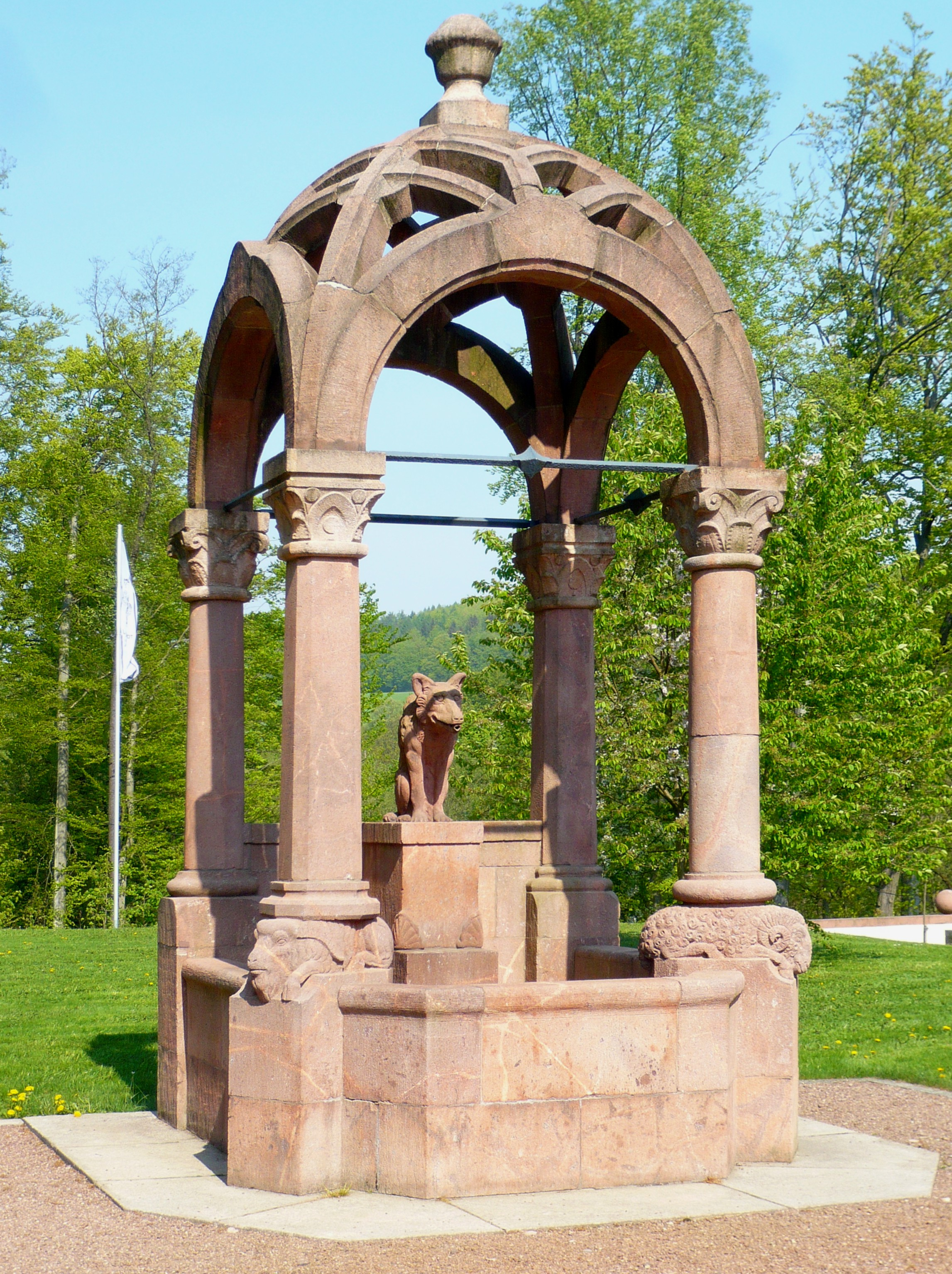
The well in front of the house from which it derives its name

In 1934 the owner died and the estate became a communal property. After that, during the Nazi era the site acted as a youth hostel, a Reichsführer Interior School (Reichsführerinnenschule), a military hospital for officers and quarters for staff of the Wehrmacht.

After the Second World War, the house was initially used for evacuees, until it became a district youth school for the Free German Youth on the foundation of the German Democratic Republic. Later pioneer leaders were trained here, who qualified as junior teachers (Unterstufenlehrer) by taking additional instruction in education.

After the Wende the house remained empty for several years. In 1997 the brothers Uwe, Helge and Karl-Ludwig Leonhardt bought the villa as Gebrüder Leonhardt GbR from the town of Hartenstein. With an investment of 10 million Mark they had it converted into a hotel and nature park; it has also been used since as an example park (Musterpark) by the Free State of Saxony. On 1 March 1999 it opened as the Schlosshotel Wolfsbrunn. Between 1997 and its reopening as a hotel, the refurbishment and renovation work carried out included the renovation of the facade paintwork. For this, the Zschorlau paint firm of used high-grade silicone exterior paint. Stübner also did the stucco restoration and wall coverings in the restaurant area. Initially the hotel had two restaurant facilities, a gourmet restaurant rated at 14 Gault-Millau points, and the Georg Wolf Restaurant.

In the early part of the 21st century the hotel was converted again and since 2010 has been run as a high standard guest house or inn (Gästehaus mit gehobenem Standard). It employs 30 staff, of whom 5 are trainees.
