= Division of Altenburg =

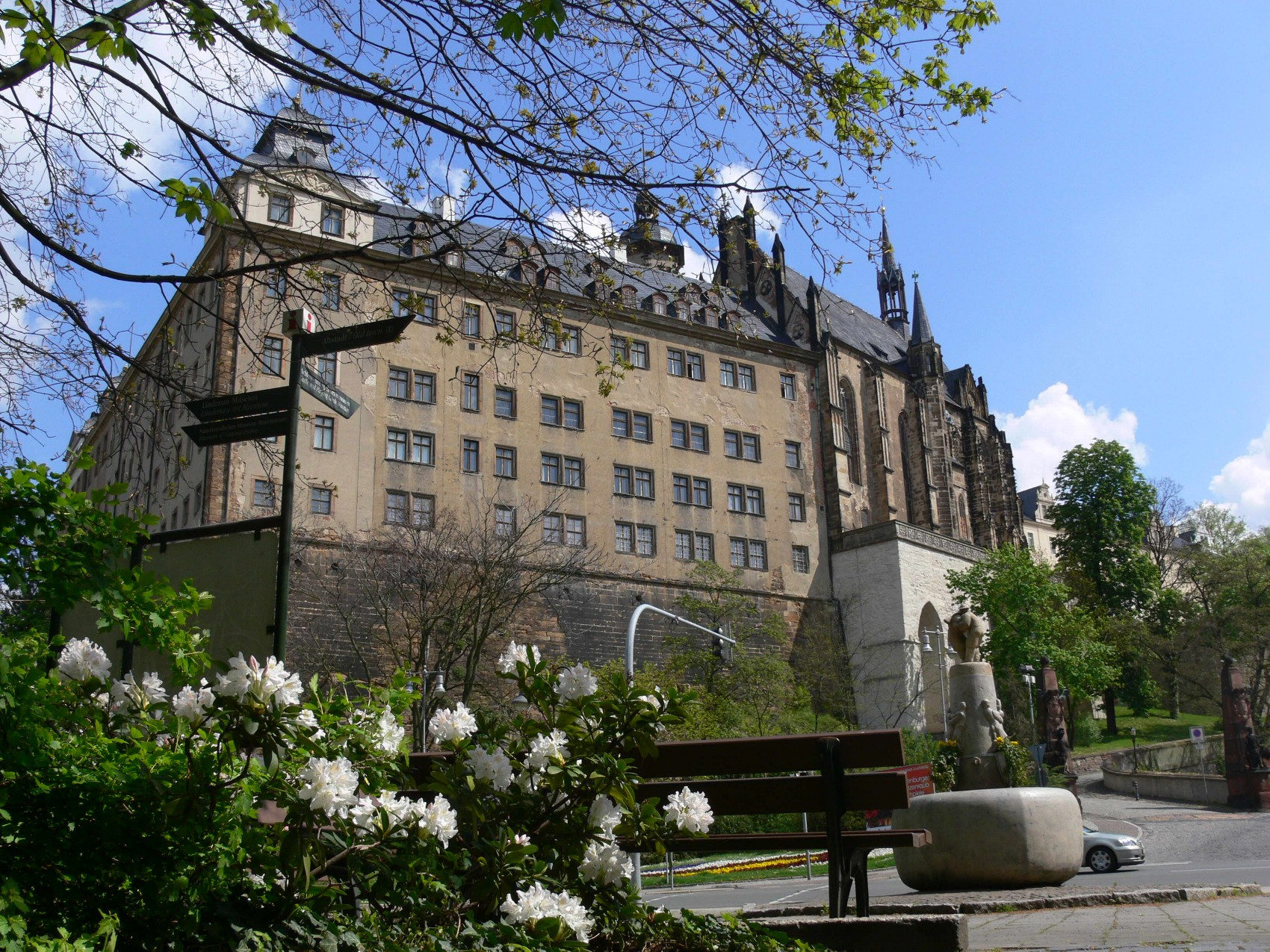
Altenburg Castle

The Division of Altenburg (German: Altenburger Teilung) was the plan for the division of the Meissen lands agreed upon by the two hostile Wettin brothers Elector Frederick II of Saxony and William III on 16 July 1445 at Altenburg. The brothers had attempted to reconcile, but eventually the division led the Saxon Fratricidal War (German: Sächsischer Bruderkrieg), which began in 1446 and lasted for five years, until the Peace of Naumburg was negotiated in 1451. Following the peace, the subsequent Treaty of Eger in 1459, and the deaths of Frederick II and William III, the two sons of Frederick II eventually gained control of the land of both their father and William III.

== Family situation ==
By the 15th century, the noble house of Wettin and its line of Upper Saxon princes had gained a large amount of land over the years mainly through inheritance, including the Margraviate of Meissen and the Duchy of Saxe-Wittenberg, which was elevated to the Electorate of Saxony according to the Golden Bull of 1356. Margrave Frederick IV of Meissen became Saxon elector (as Frederick I) in 1423. Upon the death of his younger brother William II in 1425, he ruled over all Wettin lands except for the Landgraviate of Thuringia, held by his cousin Frederick the Peaceful.

Elector Frederick ruled over his lands until his death in 1428. With his death, his four sons Frederick, William, Henry, and Sigismund took control. While Henry died in 1435 and Sigismund was forced to renounce his claims to become Bishop of Würzburg in 1440, only two sons, Frederick and William, now ruled over their family's land. As the eldest, Frederick II held the Electorate of Saxony and some land around Wittenberg in his own right, while he controlled the remainder of the land jointly with William. This continued peacefully and without serious incident until 1440, when their uncle Landgrave Frederick of Thuringia died childless and the two brothers inherited his extensive lands as well as the title of Landgrave of Thuringia.

== Division ==
The brothers quarreled over the division of this new land in Thuringia and on 16 July 1445 the Saxon estates tried to reconcile them in the Division of Altenburg: Frederick II should retain the electoral dignity and the Margraviate of Meissen, while the younger William II should rule the –highly indebted– Landgrave of Thuringia up to the Osterland region in the east. However, when Frederick chose the western part and not the Margraviate of Meissen on 26 September 1445 in Leipzig, William furiously rejected the division. On December 11 of the same year the brothers again attempted to reconcile in the monastery of Neuwerk in Halle in what was known as the Hallescher Machtspruch (Halle Dictum). Archbishop Frederick III of Magdeburg, Elector Frederick II of Brandenburg and Landgrave Louis II of Hesse actively participated as judges. The division was even confirmed by the Habsburg king Frederick III, however the two brothers ultimately failed to reach a peaceful resolution.

In June 1446, one day after William's marriage with the Habsburg princess Anne of Austria, the split led to a war between the two brothers known as the Saxon Fratricidal War (Sächsischer Bruderkrieg). The brothers continued fighting until peace was reached in a meeting at Naumburg on 27 January 1451. Later, in the 1459 Treaty of Eger, Elector Frederick II, his brother Duke William III, and King George of Poděbrady fixed the borders between the Kingdom of Bohemia and the Saxon electorate. This border along the crest of the Ore Mountains is still current and is one of the oldest existing borders in Central Europe.

== Aftermath ==
After Frederick's death in 1464, his two sons Ernest and Albert III inherited his land. When Duke William III died in 1482, Ernest annexed Thuringia and returned it to Frederick's original line. Ernest then shared many of his lands in a second division with his brother, Albert, because of the Treaty of Leipzig on 26 August 1485. In this second division of the Wettin lands between Ernest and Albert, also known as the Division of Leipzig (Leipziger Teilung), Altenburg fell to Ernest, together with the electoral lands around Wittenberg, the Grimma estates, the Mutschener Pflege, Leisnig, large parts of Thuringia, and the Vogtland region around Plauen. From this time on, Altenburg was historically connected with Thuringia.

Following the multiple divisions and the Saxon Fratricidal War, the Wettins lost much of their power among the leading German noble families and houses, most notably in favour of the rising Habsburg and Hohenzollern dynasties.
