= Hartenstein, Saxony =

Hartenstein
- Town
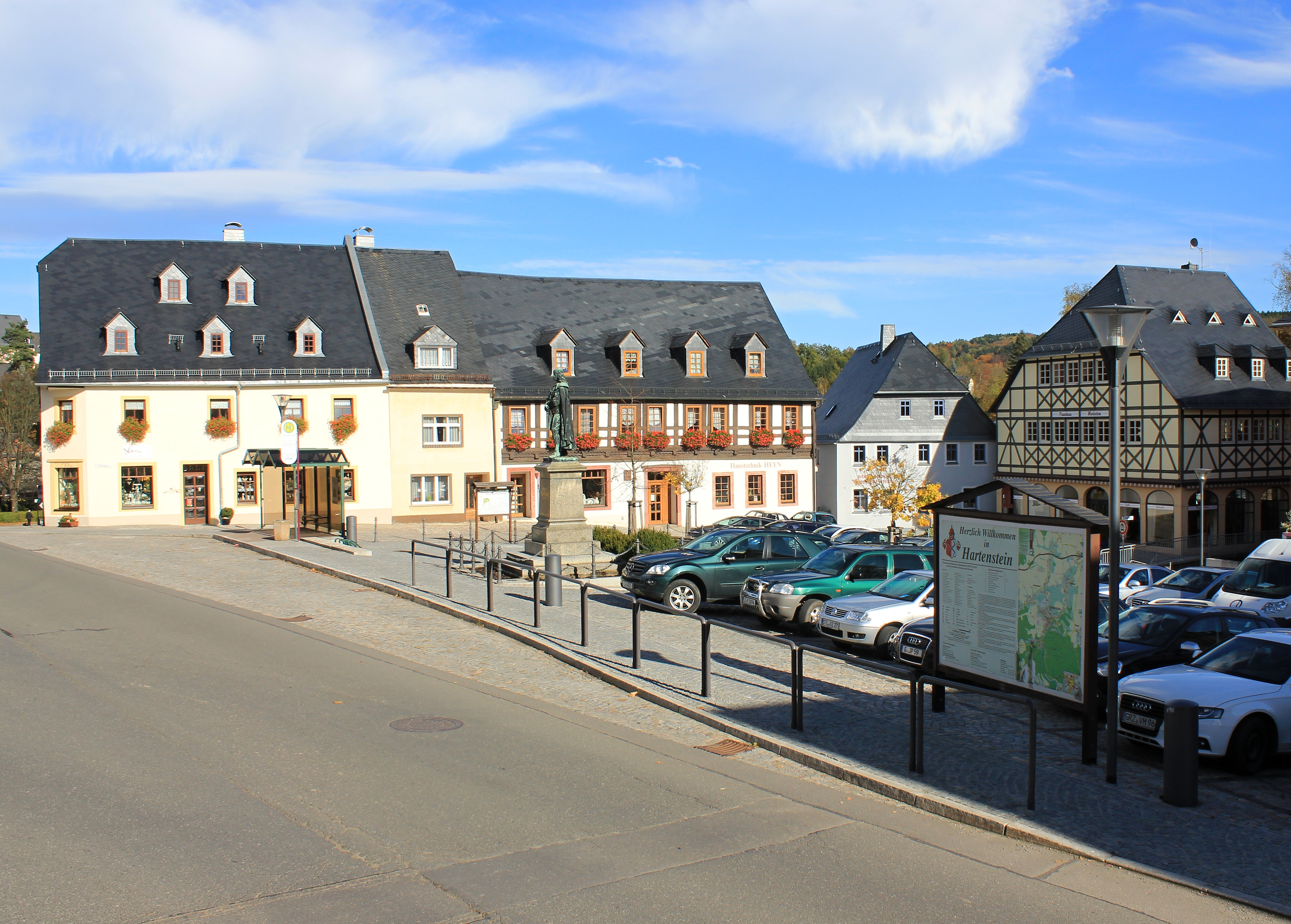
- Market square

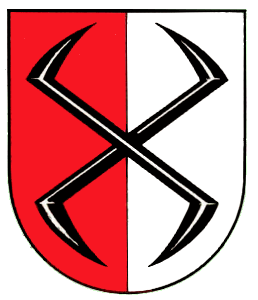
- Coat of arms

- Location of Hartenstein within Zwickau district
- Interactive map of Hartenstein
- Location within Germany Location within Saxony
- Coordinates: 50°40′6″N 12°40′17″E
- Country: Germany
- State: Saxony
- District: Zwickau
- Subdivisions: 3

Government
  - Mayor (2020–27): Martin Kunz

Area
  - Total: 36.7 km^{2} (14.2 sq mi)
- Elevation: 360 m (1,180 ft)

Population (2025-12-31)
  - Total: 4,403
  - Density: 120/km^{2} (311/sq mi)
- Time zone: UTC+01:00 (CET)
  - Summer (DST): UTC+02:00 (CEST)
- Postal codes: 08118
- Dialling codes: 037605
- Vehicle registration: Z
- Website: www.stadt-hartenstein.de

Hartenstein (German pronunciation: [ˈhaʁtn̩ʃtaɪn]) is a town in the Zwickau district, in Saxony, Germany. It is situated on the river Zwickauer Mulde, 14 km southeast of Zwickau.

The county of Hartenstein was owned by the House of Schönburg from 1406 until 1945.

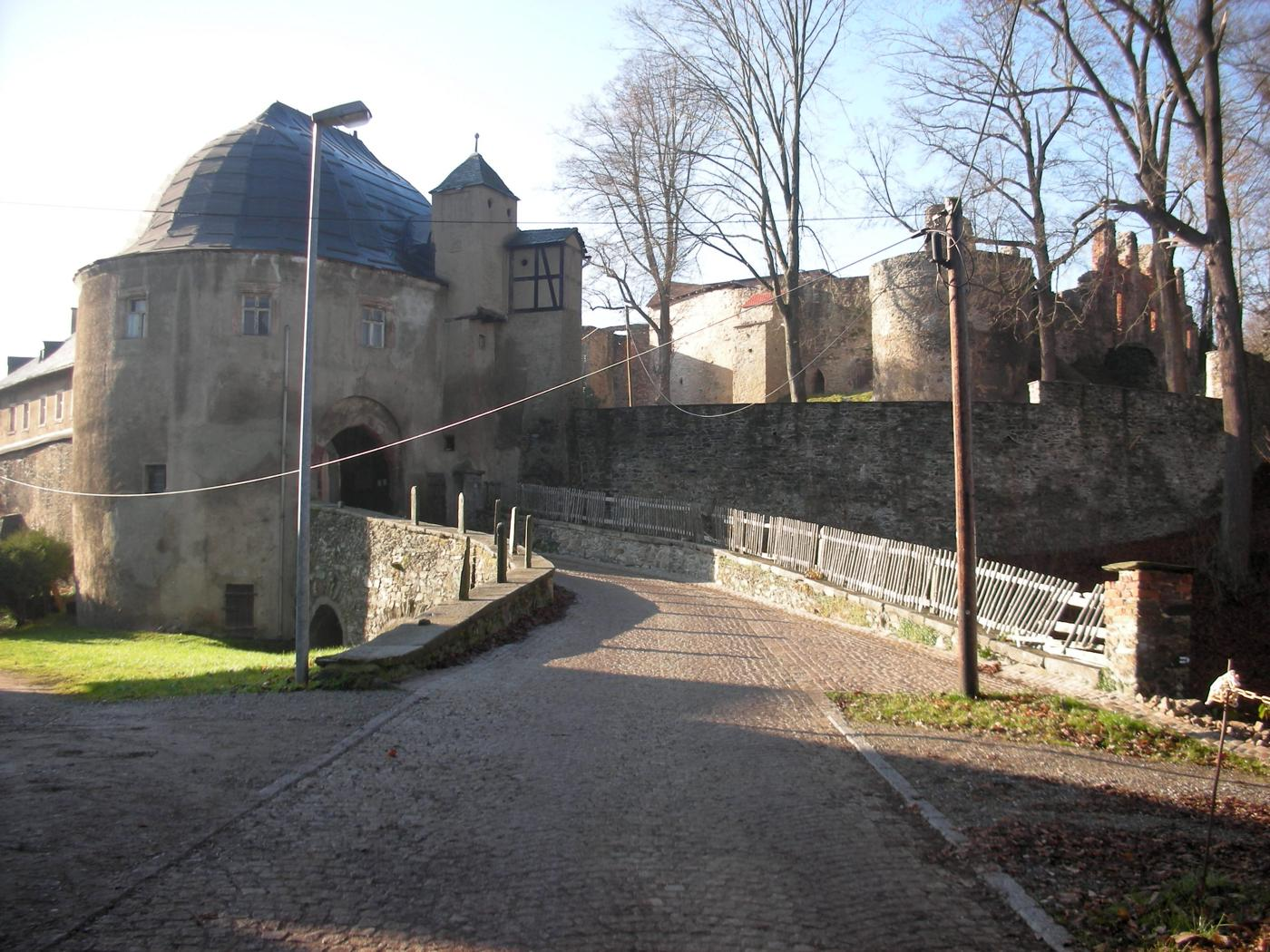
Hartenstein Castle

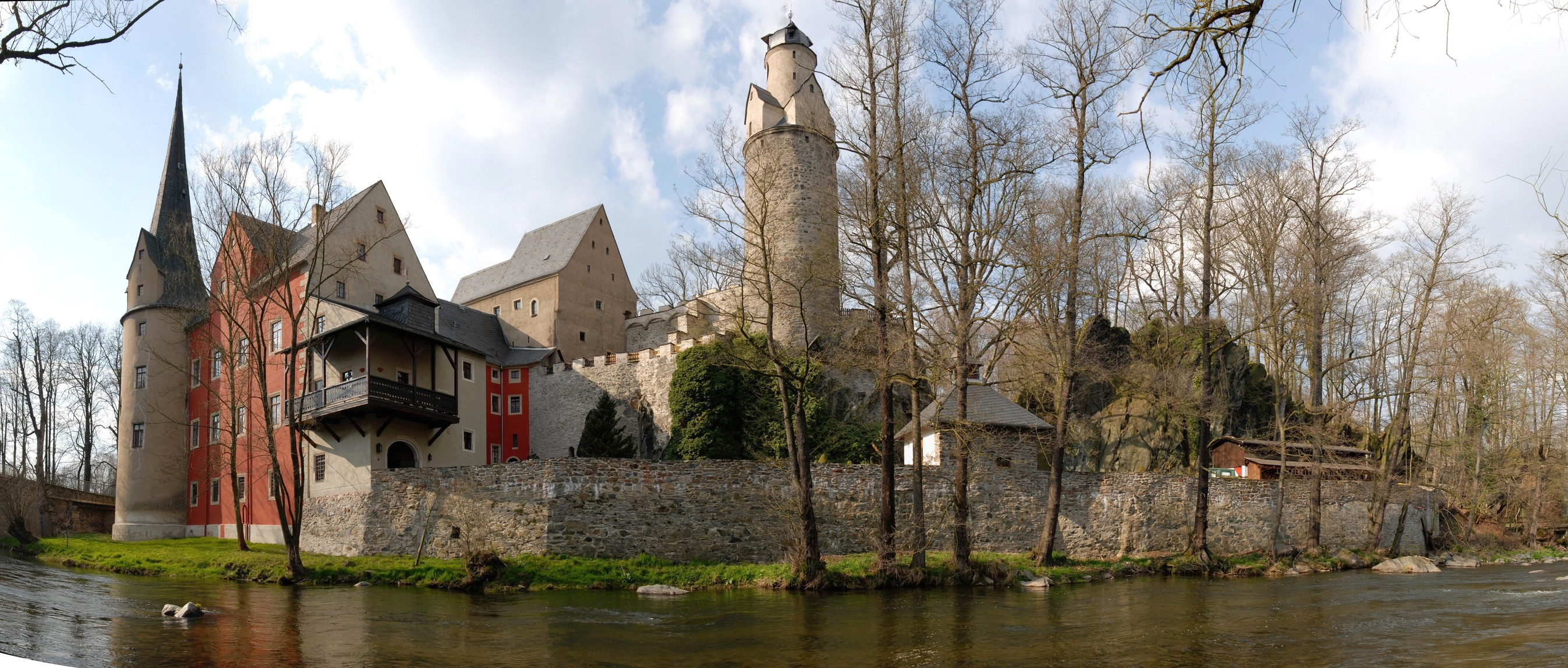
Stein Castle in Hartenstein

== Sons and daughters of the city ==
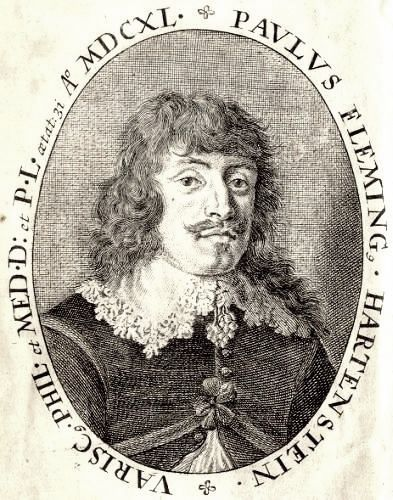
Paul Fleming

- Johann Heinrich von Lindenau (born 1586 at the castle Hartenstein, † 1615 in Börnichen b. Oederan), owner of a manor
- Paul Fleming (poet) (1609-1640), physician and writer of the Baroque
- Magnus Meischner (1821-1892), jurist and politician, MdL (Kingdom of Saxony)
- Albrecht Neubert (1930-2017), translation scholar
