= Zwickauer Mulde =

River in Germany

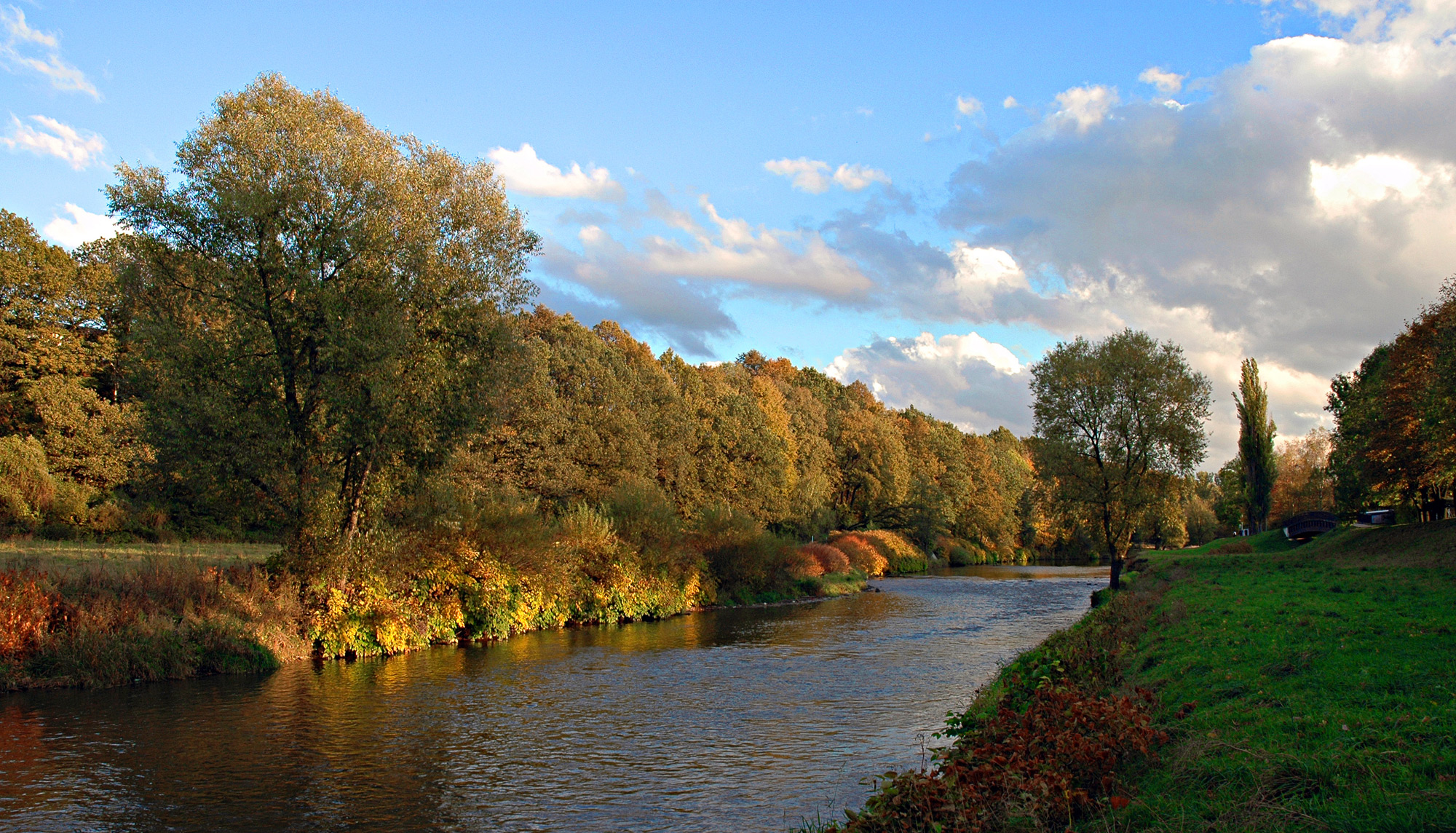
- Zwickauer Mulde in Zwickau

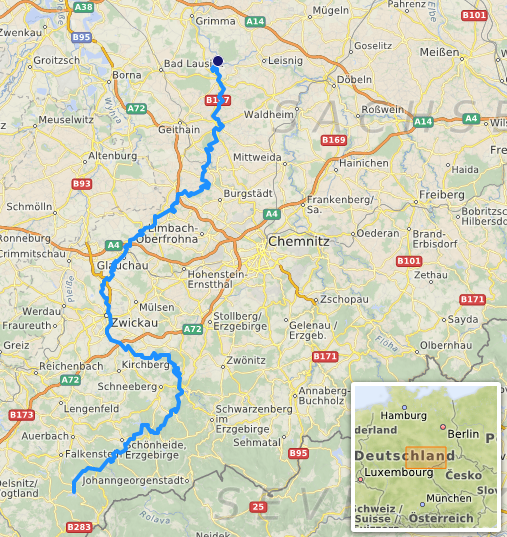

Location
- Country: Germany
- State: Saxony

Physical characteristics
- Source
  - location: Ore Mountains
- Mouth
  - location: Mulde
  - coordinates: 51°09′37″N 12°47′54″E
- Length: 166 km (103 mi)

Basin features
- Progression: Mulde→ Elbe→ North Sea

The Zwickauer Mulde (German pronunciation: [ˈtsvɪkaʊɐ ˈmʊldə]) is a river in Saxony, Germany. It is the left tributary of the Mulde and 166 km (103 mi) in length.

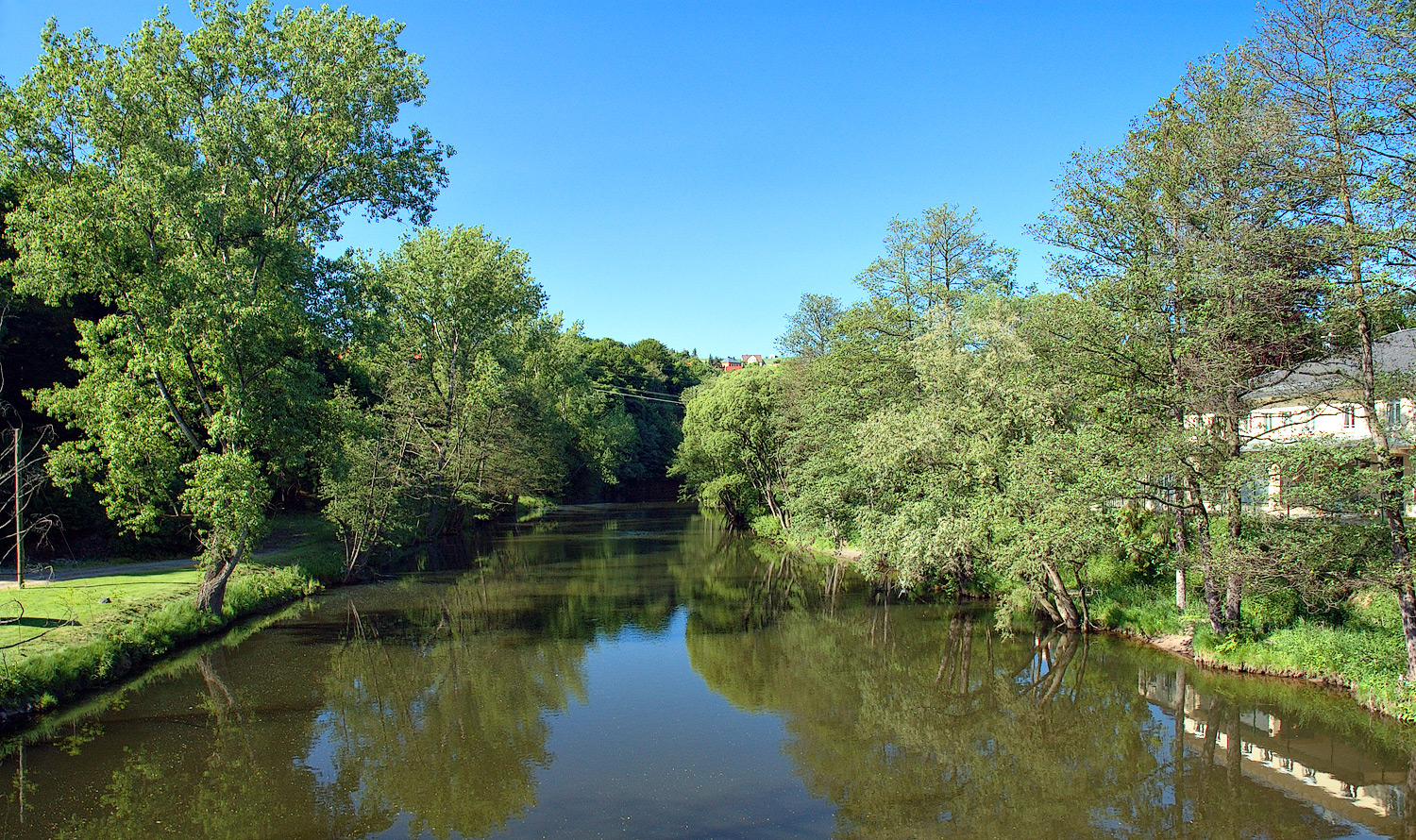
The Zwickau Mulde in Wilkau-Haßlau

The source of the river is in the Ore Mountains, near Schöneck, in the Vogtlandkreis. It runs northeast to Aue, then northwest to Zwickau (hence the name), and further north through Glauchau, Rochlitz and Colditz. A few kilometers north of Colditz, the Zwickauer Mulde is joined by the Freiberger Mulde to form the united Mulde. The Mulde is a tributary of the Elbe.

== History ==
=== Cultural landscape development ===
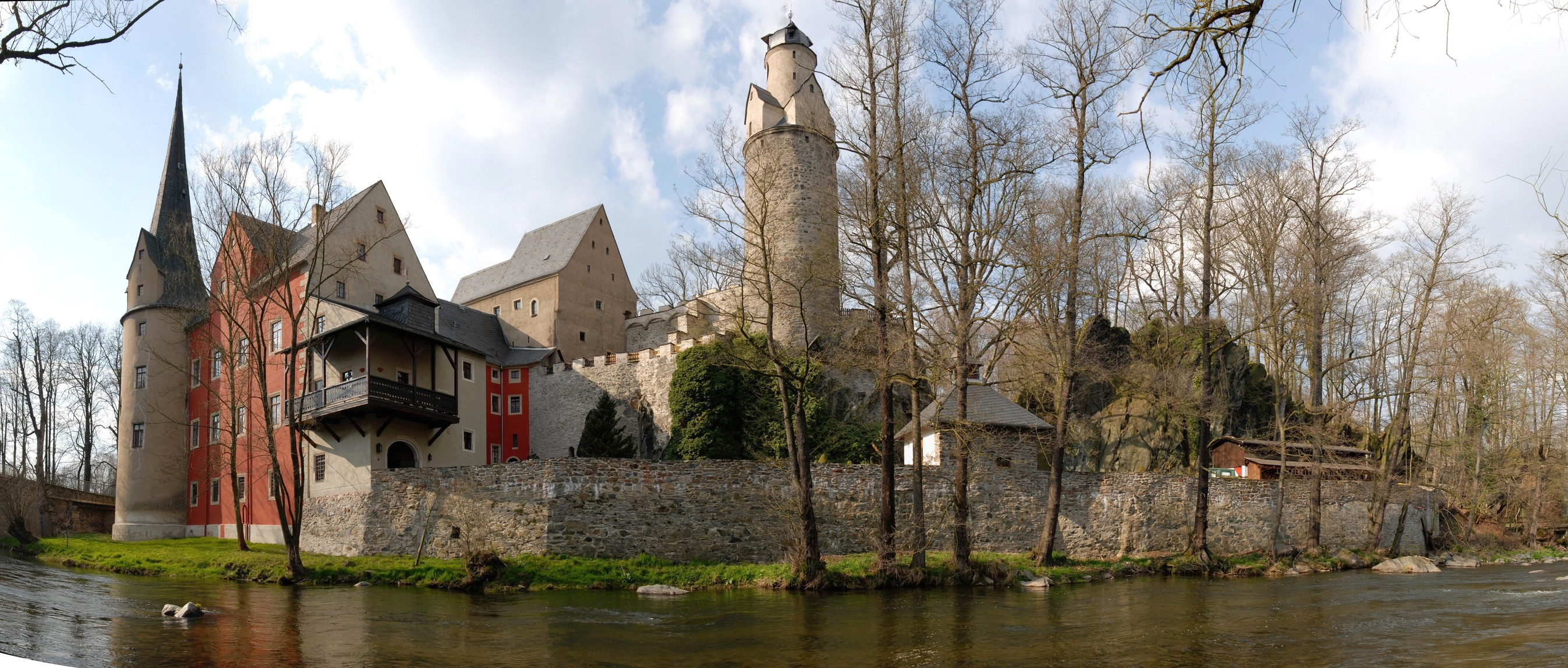
Stein Castle on the rocky river bank near Hartenstein

The valleys in the catchment area of the Mulde were presumably used from the end of the last cold stage as access routes into the Ore Mountains that was covered in dense, ancient forests. This is evinced by the remains of artifacts left behind by Old Stone Age hunters, as well as Bronze Age and Iron Age discoveries as far as the higher regions of the Ore Mountains.

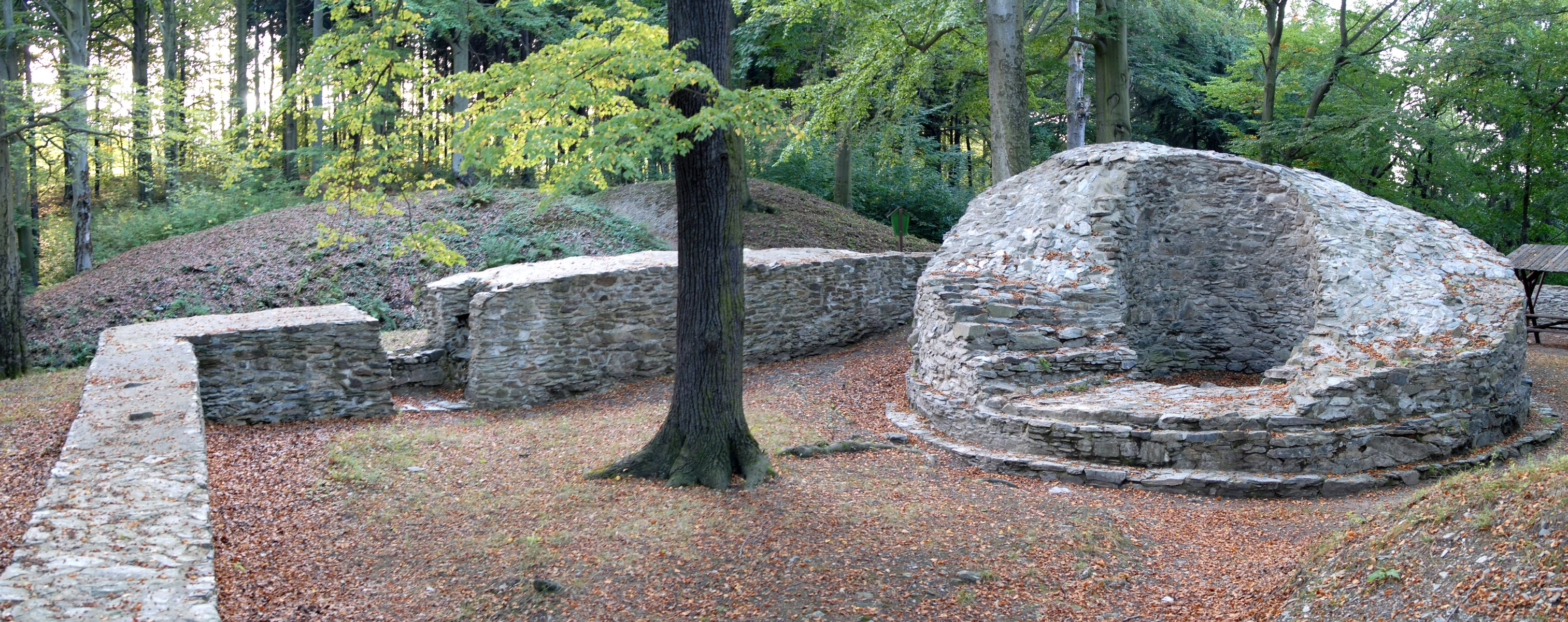
The castle ruins of Isenburg

Later, the western Ore Mountains became the territory of Germanic and Slavic tribes. Paths, trade routes and military roads, linked the old settlement areas around Leipzig and Altenburg with Bohemia. The mule tracks, however, avoided the rivers in favour of the ridges. At unavoidable river crossings, (fords, later ferries and bridges) and at intersections castles, villages and monasteries were established. Of the palaces and manor houses, Rochsburg, Rochlitz, Wolkenburg, Waldenburg, Forderglauchau, Hinterglauchau and Osterstein have survived. Of the castles, Wiesenburg, Stein Castle and the Isenburg remain. Fortifications constructed in the side valleys include Hartenstein, Wildenfels and Schwarzenberg. With the discovery of the rich silver deposits in the late Middle Ages, settlements grew up around the source streams in the upper Ore Mountains and the mining towns emerged.

== Sights and structures ==
- Eibenstock Dam

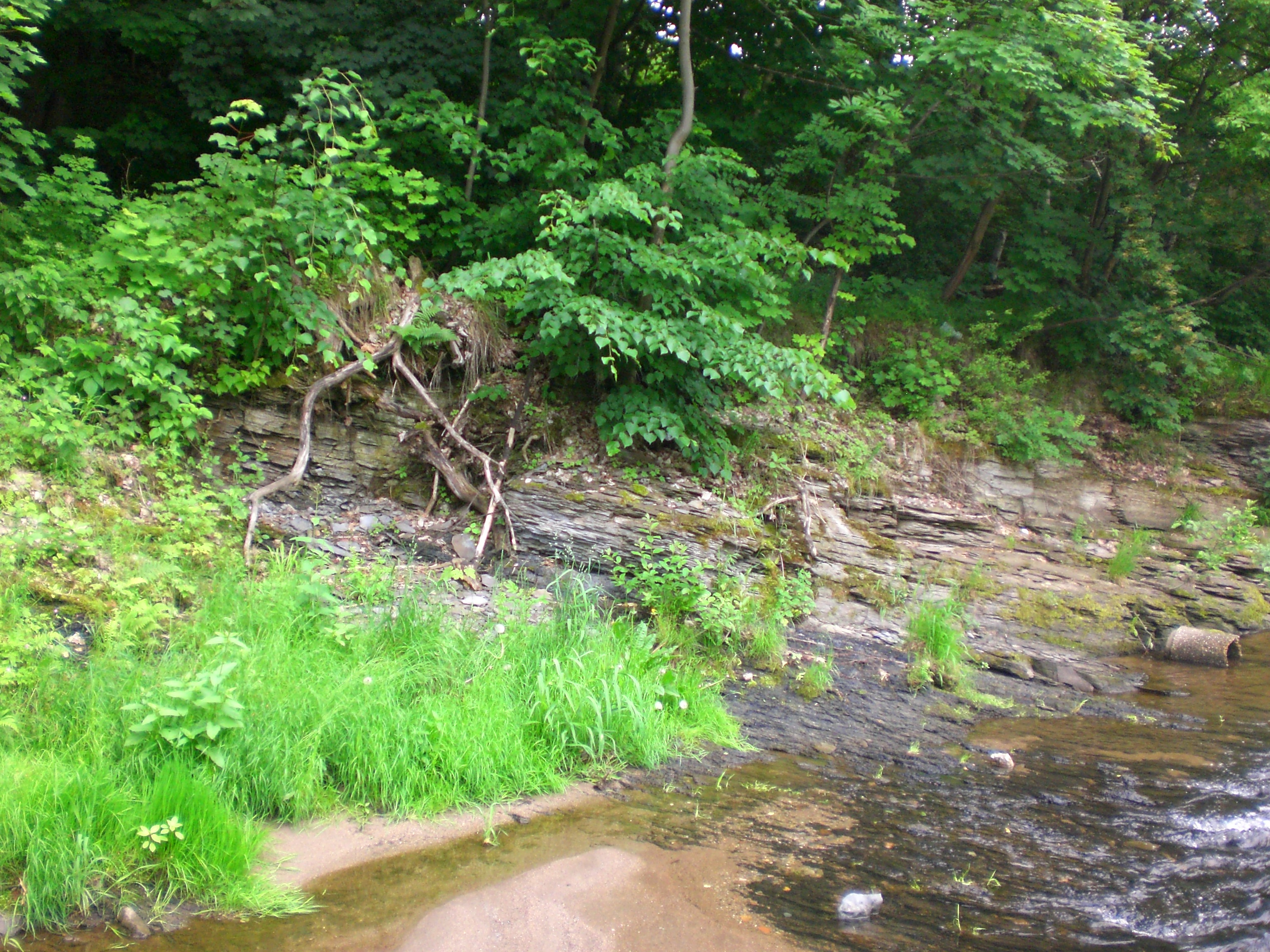
Outcrop on the left bank of the Rußkohlenflöz near Cainsdorf railway station

- Prince's Cave in the side of the valley below Bad Schlema (Poppenwald)
- Stein Castle and
- Schloss Wolfsbrunn in Hartenstein
- Annual demonstration timber rafting on the Muldenberg rafting waterway system
- Above Zwickau, in Cainsdorf, the Mulde cuts the Rußkohlenflöz (soot coal seam). This outcrop of a permanently exposed coal seam is unique in Saxony. It is also a rare example in Europe of an outcrop representing three geological time periods (the Silurian, the Devonian and the Upper Carboniferous). It is protected as a geotope and geological natural monument.
- Osterstein Castle in Zwickau

== See also ==
- List of rivers of Saxony
