= Upper Saxony =

Historic lands in Central Germany

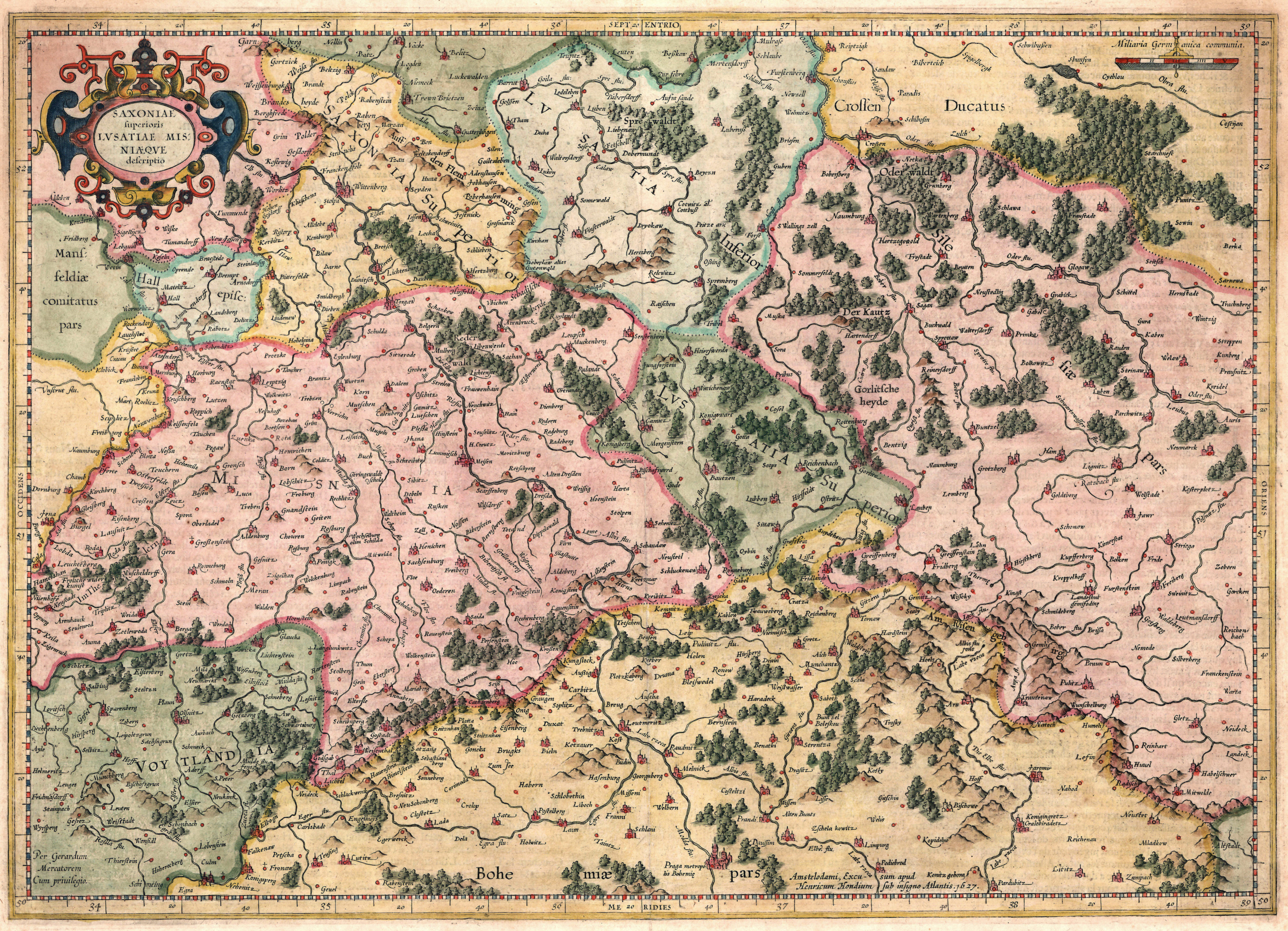
Upper Saxony (Saxonia superioris) as designation for the former Duchy of Saxe-Wittenberg (yellow), not including Meissenia and the Lusatia, according to Mercator–Hondius atlas (1627)

Upper Saxony (German: Obersachsen, pronounced [ˈoːbɐˌzaksn̩]; Latin: Saxonia superioris) is a polysemic designation for various historical, geographical and linguistic regions, situated in eastern parts of modern Germany, and mainly centred, depending on the context, on the Free State of Saxony and the neighboring State of Saxony-Anhalt, with their adjacent surroundings. The term was devised in order to make distinction between the lands of Saxony proper (historical Old Saxony with the Stem Duchy of Saxony) and regions further to the southeast, on the middle Elbe, that became known as Saxony through later transfers of Saxon ducal titles and dynastic claims of Ascanians (since 1180) and Wettins (since 1423). Thus by the 16th century, it became common to use the term Lower Saxony (Latin: Saxonia inferioris) as a designation for the old Saxon lands (as in the name of the modern State of Lower Saxony), while the term Upper Saxony became a descriptive designation for new Saxon lands in regions of the middle Elbe. Those distinctions were reflected in names of Imperial Circles, one of them being named the Upper Saxon Circle (1512–1806).

== History ==
The Upper Saxon Circle (1512–1806)

The name derives from complex historical processes, that occurred after 1180, when the old Stem Duchy of Saxony was dissolved and the Saxon ducal title passed to the House of Ascania, that held various possessions in Elbe regions, thus initiating the expansion of Saxon ducal designations towards east. Upon the Ascanian dynastic division in 1296, domains of two Saxon ducal branches became known as the Duchy of Saxe-Lauenburg and the Duchy of Saxe-Wittenberg. Their mutual dispute over the title and office of Prince-Elector was resolved by the Golden Bull (1356), in favor of the Saxe-Wittenberg branch, thus establishing the sole Electorate of Saxony on the middle Elbe, outside the scope of Saxony proper.

In 1423, the electoral dignity and Saxe-Wittenberg domains were transferred to the House of Wettin, that held various lands further to the southeast (Margraviate of Meissen and other possessions), thus initiating the process of further expansion and terminological saxonization of all Wettin possessions, including even those in historical Thuringia (the so-called Saxon duchies of the House of Wettin in Thuringia). Further administrative integration of domains acquired by the Albertine Wettins after the Capitulation of Wittenberg in 1547 led to the creation of an expanded (upper) Saxony on the middle Elbe, thus replacing the old, both Slavic and German designations for those regions, such as Sorbia or Meissenia (Latin: Misnia). The Wettins acquired Lusatia by the 1635 Peace of Prague, thus adding that region to their Saxon domains.

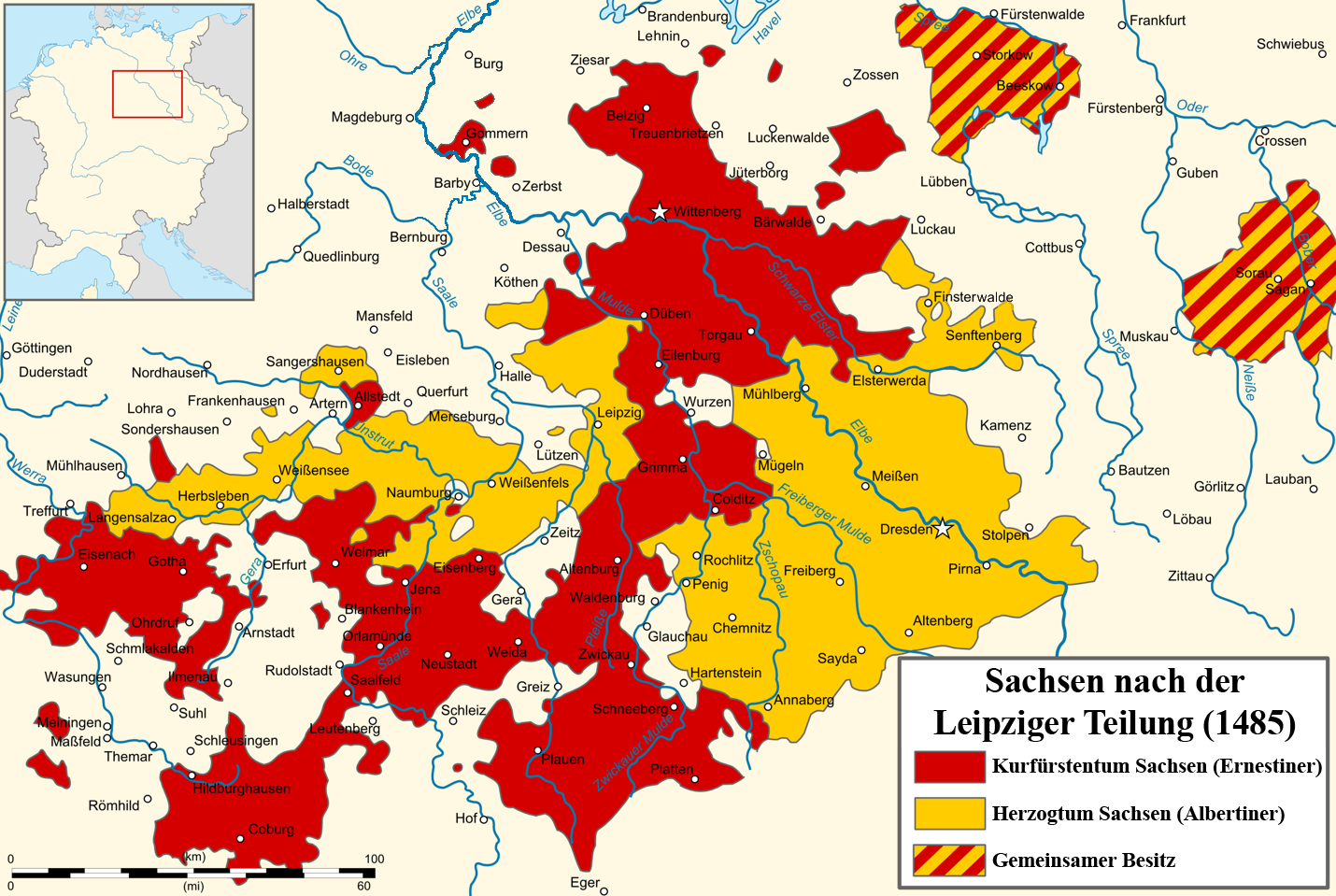
Ernestine Saxony (red) and Albertine Saxony (yellow) upon the Treaty of Leipzig (1485)

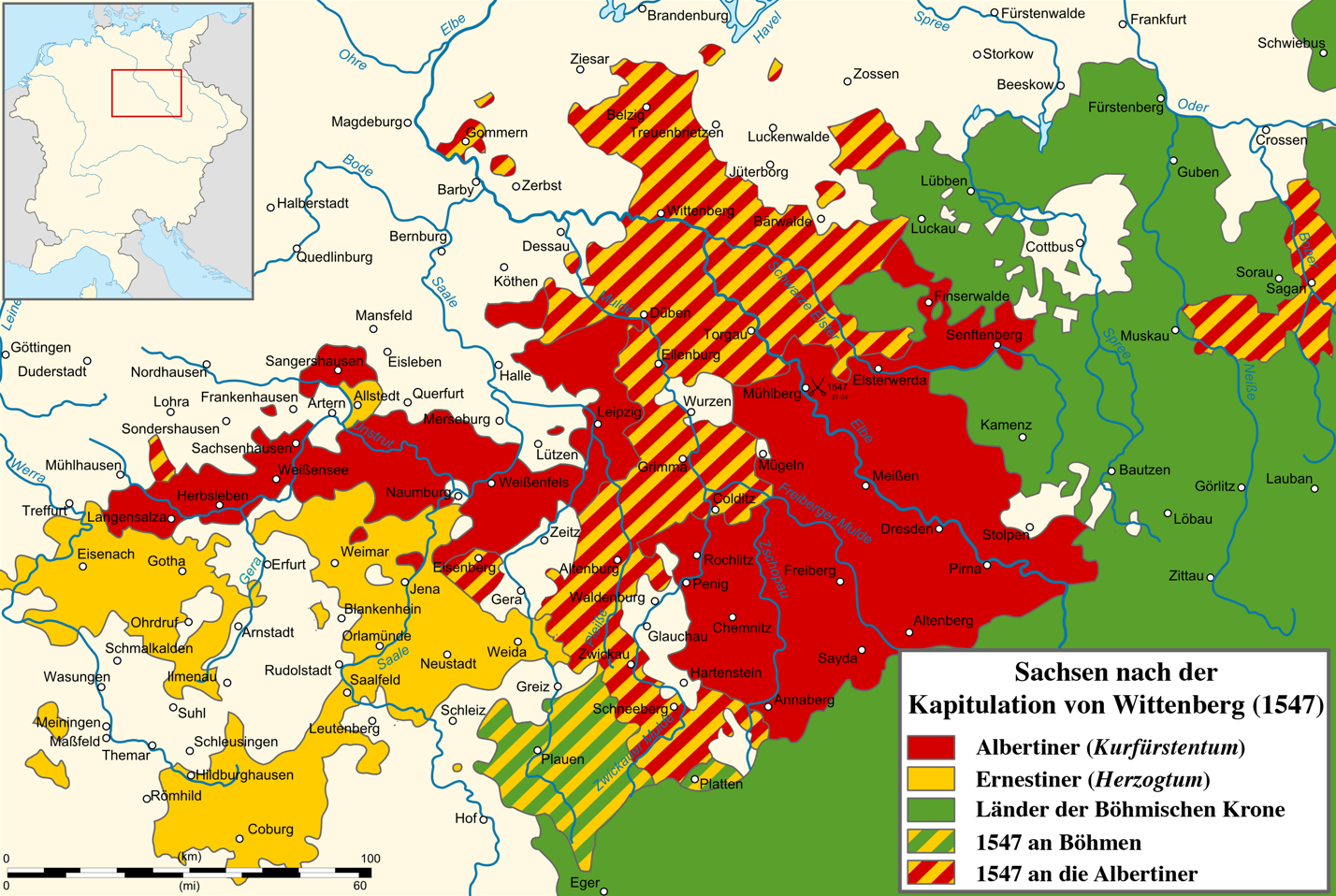
Ernestine Saxony (yellow) and Albertine Saxony (red) upon the Capitulation of Wittenberg (1547)

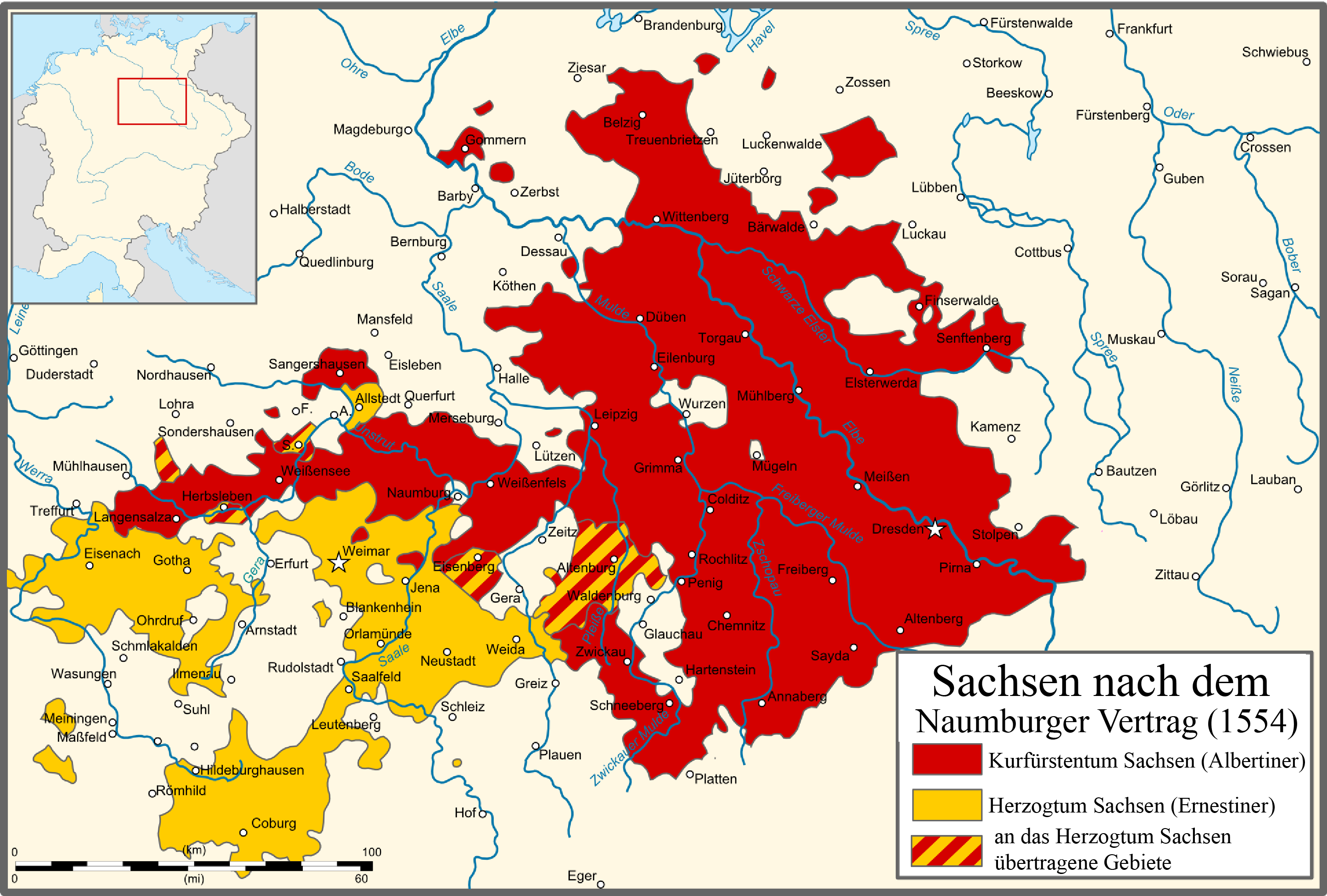
Ernestine Saxony (yellow) and Albertine Saxony (red) upon the Treaty of Naumburg (1554)

Since 1512, Upper Saxon designations gained official use within the name of the newly formed Upper Saxon Circle, encompassing all northeastern states of the Holy Roman Empire. The specific Upper Saxon designation was thus used to distinguish those lands from Lower Saxony, within the neighboring imperial circle to the west, that came to be known as the Lower Saxon Circle, partially corresponding to the modern State of Lower Saxony.

In linguistics, the East Central German dialects of Upper Saxon (Meißenisch and Osterländisch) are placed in the Thuringian-Upper Saxon continuum.

== See also ==
- Upper Saxon Circle
- Upper Saxon dialect
- History of Saxony
- History of Saxony-Anhalt
- History of Lower Saxony

== Sources ==
- Althoff, Gerd (1999). "Saxony and the Elbe Slavs in the Tenth Century". The New Cambridge Medieval History. Vol. 3. Cambridge: Cambridge University Press. pp. 267–292.
- Blaschke, Karlheinz (2002). "Die Leipziger Teilung der wettinischen Länder von 1485". Beiträge zur Verfassungs- und Verwaltungsgeschichte Sachsens: Ausgewählte Aufsätze von Karlheinz Blaschke. Leipzig: Leipziger Universitätsverlag. pp. 323–335.
- Groß, Reiner (2007). Die Wettiner. Stuttgart: Kohlhammer Verlag.
- Retallack, James (2000). "Locating Saxony in the Landscape of German Regional History". Saxony in German History: Culture, Society, and Politics, 1830-1933. Ann Arbor: The University of Michigan Press. pp. 1–30.
- Reuter, Timothy (2013) [1991]. Germany in the Early Middle Ages c. 800–1056. London and New York: Routledge.
- Stieldorf, Andrea (2026) [2012]. Marken und Markgrafen: Studien zur Grenzsicherung durch die fränkisch-deutschen Herrscher (2nd ed.). Wiesbaden: Harrassowitz Verlag.
- Tebruck, Stefan (2005). "Zwischen Integration und Selbstbehauptung: Thüringen im wettinischen Herrschaftsbereich". Fragen der politischen Integration im mittelalterlichen Europa. Ostfildern: Jan Thorbecke Verlag. pp. 375–412, 589–591.
- Wilson, Peter H. (2016). Heart of Europe: A History of the Holy Roman Empire. Cambridge: Harvard University Press.
