= History of Saxony =

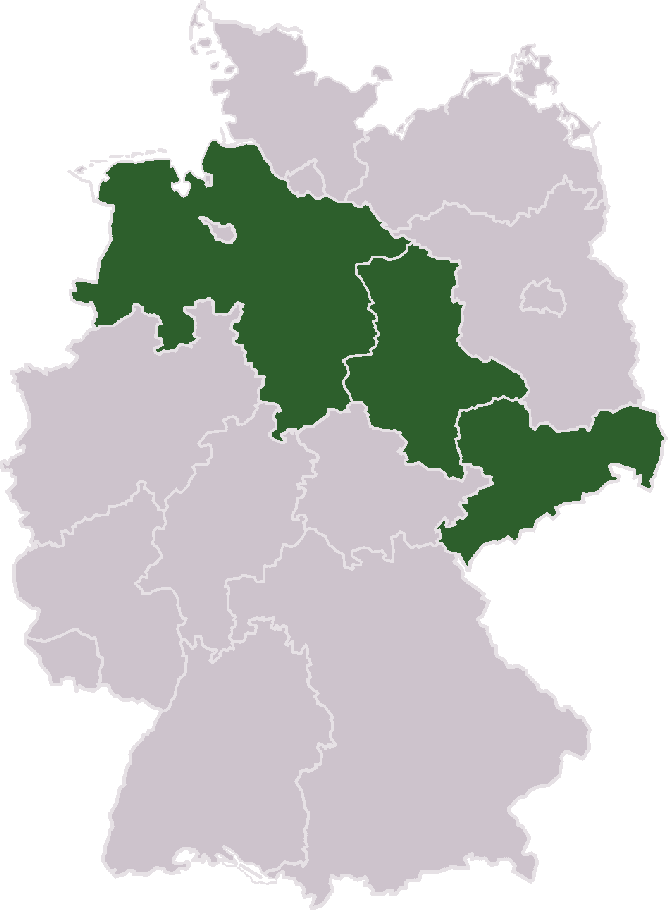
Territorial scope of modern (geopolitical) Saxony: post-1990 German states of Saxony (southeast), Saxony-Anhalt (center) and Lower Saxony (northwest)

The history of Saxony encompasses the history of the modern German state of Saxony and its predecessors in the wider region of Upper Saxony, and also includes the historical overview of various medieval and early modern states named Saxony, situated in regions that initially belonged to the Old Saxony and located today mainly within boundaries of modern German states of Lower Saxony and Saxony-Anhalt. Complex regional histories of various states and provinces that bore the Saxon name from medieval to modern times thus jointly constitute a wider history of Saxony.

== Scope ==
Historical states named Saxony were varying significantly in their territorial scopes, particularly during the medieval and early modern times, while their geopolitical developments and traditions were often marked by conflicting dynastic claims and subsequent transfers of Saxon titles and designations to various regions beyond boundaries of the original (old) Saxony.

In some regions, such terminological saxonization did not gain permanent ground, as in Thuringia, where early modern Saxon duchies (Wettinian states in Thuringia) did not erase Thuringian regional identity (officially restored in 1920 by the creation of the State of Thuringia). In other territories, particularly in regions on the middle Elbe, gradual expansion of Saxon designations became permanent, thus replacing older, both Slavic and German geopolitical terms (the old March of Meissen was associated with the Electorate of Saxony only since 1423, and the March of Lusatia only since 1635).

On the other hand, the core regions of the Old Saxony, that started to lose their formal Saxon designations already after the division of the Stem Duchy of Saxony in 1180, managed to officially regain their original Saxon name only in 1946, with the establishment of the modern German state of Lower Saxony, a term borrowed from the former imperial Lower Saxon Circle (1512).

== Old Saxony ==
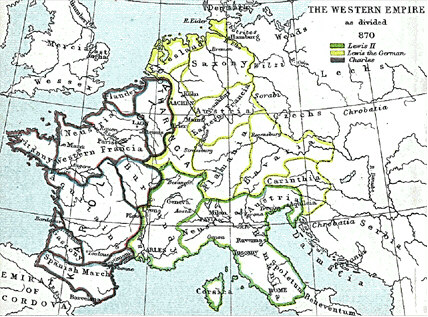
870 Saxony.

The name of Saxony was derived from the Saxons (Latin: Saxones), an early Germanic tribe that was living in the North Sea coastal regions around the river Elbe. During the 3rd and 4th centuries, Germany was inhabited by great tribal confederations of the Alamanni, Bavarians, Thuringians, Franks, Frisii, and Saxons. These took the place of numerous petty tribes with their own popular tribal forms of government. With the exception of the Saxons, all these confederations were ruled by kings. The Saxons, in contrast, were divided into a number of independent bodies under different chieftains. In time of war these chieftains drew lots to select a leader, who was followed by the other chieftains until the war ended.

In the 3rd and 4th centuries, the Saxons fought their way victoriously towards the west, and their name was given to the great tribal confederation that stretched towards the west exactly to the former boundary of the Roman Empire, almost to the Rhine. Only a small strip of land on the right bank of the Rhine remained to the Frankish tribe. Towards the south the Saxons pushed as far as the Harz Mountains and the Eichsfeld, and in the succeeding centuries they absorbed the greater part of Thuringia. In the east their power extended at first as far as the Elbe and Saale Rivers. In later centuries it extended much farther. The whole coast of the North Sea (the German Ocean) belonged to the Saxons except the part west of the Weser that the Frisians retained.

Ptolemy's Geographia, written in the 2nd century, is considered to contain the first written reference to the Saxons. Some copies of this text mention a tribe called Saxones in the area to the north of the lower Elbe. However, other versions refer to the same tribe as Axones. This may be a misspelling of Aviones, the name of a tribe mentioned by Tacitus in his Germania. According to this theory, the word "Saxones" was the result of later scribes trying to correct a name that meant nothing to them.

On the other hand, Schütte, in his analysis of such problems in Ptolemy's Maps of Northern Europe, believed that "Saxones" is correct. He notes that the loss of first letters occurs in numerous places in various copies of Ptolemy's work, and also that the manuscripts without "Saxones" are generally inferior overall. Schütte also remarks that there was a medieval tradition of calling this area "Old Saxony". This view is in line with Bede, who mentions that Old Saxony was near the Rhine, somewhere to the north of the river Lippe, roughly equivalent to Westphalia, the northeastern part of the modern German state of North Rhine Westphalia.

From the 8th century, the Saxons were divided into four subdivisions (gau): Westphalians, between the Rhine and the Weser; the Engern or Angrians, on both sides of the Weser; the Eastphalians, between the Weser and the Elbe; and the Transalbingians, in what is now Holstein. The only one of these names that has been preserved is Westphalians, later given to the inhabitants of the Prussian Province of Westphalia.

The Frankish King Clovis I (481-511) united the various Frankish tribes, conquered Roman Gaul, and accepted Christianity. The new Frankish kingdom was able to bring all the Germanic tribes except the Saxons under its authority and to make them Christian. For more than a hundred years there was almost uninterrupted warfare between the Franks and the Saxons.

After a bloody struggle that lasted thirty years (772–804), the Saxons were finally brought under Frankish supremacy by the Emperor Charlemagne. The earliest date at which it can be proved that Charlemagne had the conquest of the Saxon districts in view is 776. Charlemagne's campaigns were intended mainly to punish the Saxons for their annual marauding expeditions to the Rhine. Charlemagne also vigorously pursued the conversion of the Saxons to Christianity, which involved the Frankish emperor in the suppression of the native religion and brutalities such as the execution of 4,500 Saxons at Verden in 782.

== Stem Duchy of Saxony ==
When the Frankish kingdom was divided by the Treaty of Verdun (843) the territory east of the Rhine became the East Frankish Kingdom, from which the present Germany has developed. A strong central authority was lacking during the reigns of the weak East Frankish kings of the Carolingian dynasty. Each German tribe was forced to rely upon itself for defence against the incursions of the Norsemen from the north and of the Slavs from the east, consequently the tribes once more chose dukes as rulers. The first Saxon duke was Otto the Illustrious (880–912) of the Liudolfinger line (descendants of Liudolf); Otto was able to extend his power over Thuringia. Otto's son Henry was elected king of Germany (919–936); Henry is justly called the real founder of the German Empire. His son Otto I (936–973) was the first non-Carolingian German king to receive from the pope the imperial Roman crown (962). Otto I was followed as king and emperor by his son Otto II (973–983), who was succeeded by his son Otto III (983–1002).

The line of Saxon emperors expired with Henry II (1002–1024). Henry I had been both King of Germany and Duke of Saxony at the same time. Mainly for the sake of his ducal possessions he had carried on a long and difficult struggle with the Slavs on the eastern boundary of his country. The Emperor Otto I was also for the greater part of his reign Duke of Saxony. He divided the region he had acquired into several margraviates, the most important being: the North Mark, out of which in the course of time the Kingdom of Prussia developed, and the Margraviate of Meissen, from which sprang the Kingdom of Saxony. Each mark was divided into districts, not only for military and political purposes but also for ecclesiastical: the central point of each district was a fortified castle.

Otto I laid the basis of the organization of the Church in this territory by making the chief fortified places which he established in the different marks the sees of dioceses. In 960 Otto I had transferred the ducal authority over Saxony to Margrave Hermann Billung, who had distinguished himself in the struggle with the Slavs, and the ducal title became hereditary in Count Hermann's family. This old Duchy of Saxony, as it is called in distinction from the Duchy of Saxe-Wittenberg, became the centre of the opposition of the German princes to the imperial power during the era of the Franconian or Salian emperors. With the death of Duke Magnus in 1106 the Saxon ducal family, frequently called the Billung line, became extinct.

The Emperor Henry V (1106–1125) gave the Duchy of Saxony in fief to Count Lothair of Supplinburg, who in 1125 became King of Germany, and at his death (1137) transferred the Duchy of Saxony to his son-in-law, Duke Henry the Proud, of the princely family of the Welf (Guelph). Henry the Lion refused to aid the Emperor Frederick I Barbarossa in his campaign against the cities of Lombardy in 1176, consequently in 1180 the ban of the empire was proclaimed against Henry at Würzburg, and 1181 the old Duchy of Saxony was cut up at the Diet of Gelnhausen into many small portions.

== Ascanian Duchy of Saxony ==
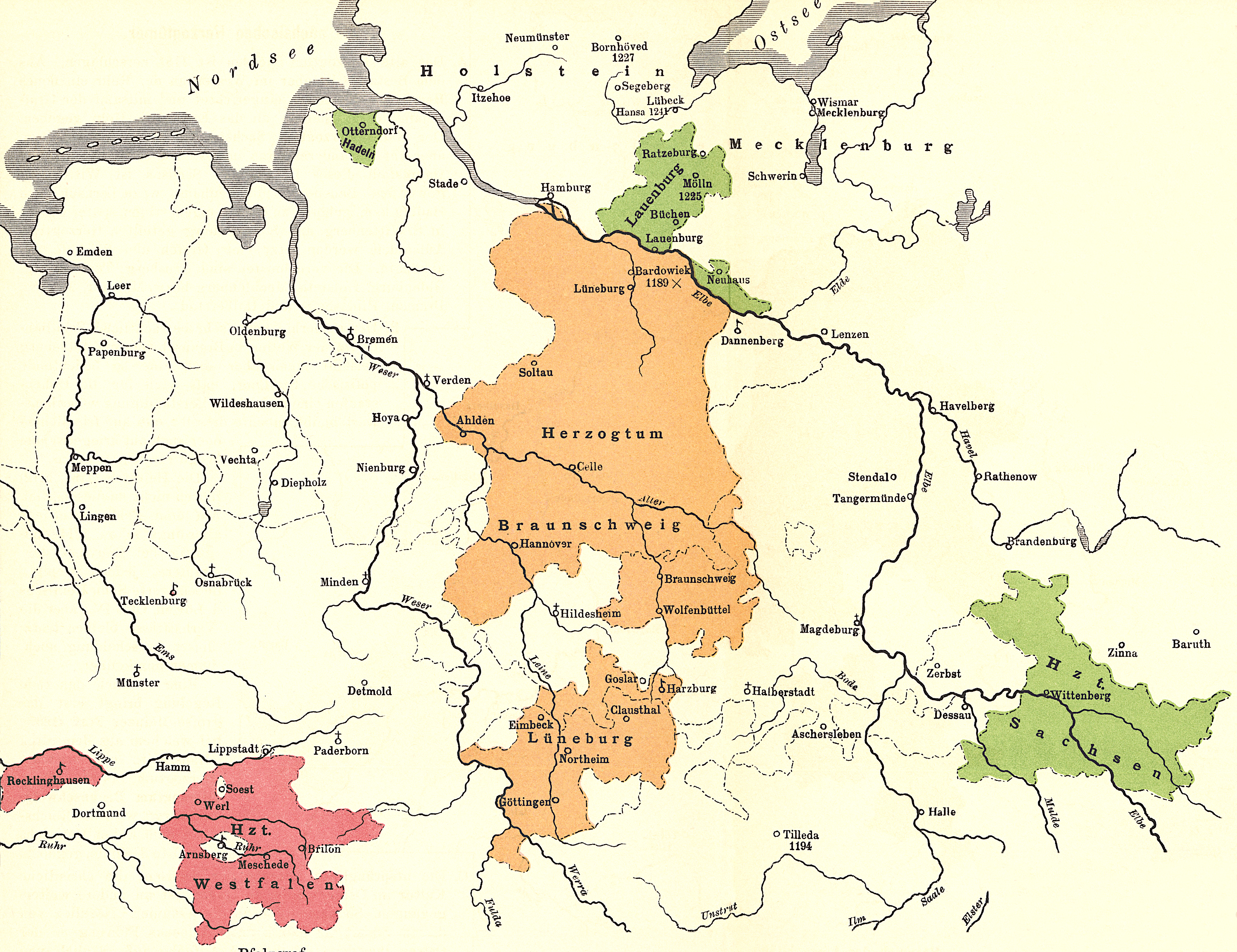
Duchies in Saxon lands (1235): the Ascanian Duchy of Saxony (green), the Welf Duchy of Brunswick-Lüneburg, and the ecclessiastical Duchy of Westphalia

Upon the division in 1180-1181, the Saxon ducal title was transferred to the House of Ascania that held possessions in eastern regions along the Elbe river, while the deposed ducal House of Welf maintained its allodial possessions, which did not remain as part of the Duchy of Saxony after the enfeoffment of the Ascanians. The Welf possessions were elevated to the Duchy of Brunswick-Lüneburg in 1235, whose subsequent successor states and provinces in core regions of the Old Saxony adopted Hanoverian designations, up to 1946.

Western portions of the old Saxon duchy were given, as the Duchy of Westphalia, to the Archbishopric of Cologne. The Saxon bishops, who had before this possessed sovereign authority in their territories, though under the suzerainty of the Duke of Saxony, gained imperial immediacy subject only to the imperial government; the case was the same with a large number of secular counties and cities.

The Diet of Gelnhausen (1181) was of much importance in the history of Germany. The Emperor Frederick executed here a great legal act. Yet the splitting up of the extensive country of the Saxons into a large number of principalities subject only to the imperial government was one of the causes of the system of petty states which proved so disadvantageous to Germany in its later history. The territory of the old duchy never again bore the name of Saxony; the large western part acquired the name of Westphalia. However, as regards customs and peculiarities of speech, the designation Lower Saxony was still in existence for the districts on the lower Elbe, that is, the northern part of the Province of Saxony, Hanover, Hamburg, etc., in distinction from Upper Saxony, that is, the Kingdom of Saxony, and Thuringia.

From the era of the conversion of the Saxons up to the revolt of the 16th century, a rich religious life was developed in the territory included in the medieval Duchy of Saxony. Art, learning, poetry, and the writing of history reached a high degree of perfection in the many monasteries. Among the most noted places of learning were the cathedral and monastery schools of Corvey, Hildesheim, Paderborn and Münster. This era produced architecturally fine churches of the Romanesque style that are still in existence, as the cathedrals of Goslar, Soest and Brunswick, the chapel of St. Bartholomew at Paderborn, the collegiate churches at Quedlinburg, Königslutter, Gernrode, etc. Hildesheim, which contains much Romanesque work, has especially fine churches of this style. The cathedrals at Naumburg, Paderborn, Münster and Osnabrück are striking examples of the Transition period. Only a few of these buildings still belong to the Catholic Church.

=== Palatinate of Saxony ===
Coats of arms of the Palatinate of Saxony

During the 10th century, within the stem Duchy of Saxony, a specific palatine county was established, known as the Palatinate of Saxony (German: Pfalzgrafschaft Sachsen) and centered in the southern Saxon Saale-Unstrut region. The first Saxon count palatine from the House of Goseck was Burchard (1003 to 1017). On the death of Frederick V in 1179, the Goseck line of counts palatine died out. That same year, the Palatinate of Saxony was enfeoffed by Emperor Frederick I Barbarossa to Louis III, Landgrave of Thuringia of the Ludovingian family. He left it to his brother Hermann I in 1181. After Hermann's death in 1217, the Palatinate fell to his son Louis IV. When Louis IV died on crusade in 1227, his brother Henry Raspe took over the affairs of state on behalf of Louis' underage son Hermann II, who died in 1241 at the age of 19, and Henry Raspe officially became ruler.

Coats of arms of the Palatinate of Thuringia

Since Henry Raspe (d. 1247) also remained childless, he obtained the contingent mortgage of the Palatinate of Saxony for his Wettin nephew Henry III, Margrave of Meissen, from the House of Wettin. After the death of Henry III in 1288, a series of land transactions, divisions and disputes occurred in the region, between the Wettin princes, and also with princes from the rival houses of Ascanians and Welfs, thus leading to the emergence of rival claims to the Saxon palatine titles and possessions. One of such claimants was Henry I, Duke of Brunswick-Grubenhagen (d. 1322). By the middle of the 14th century, the House of Wettin secured its claim over the palatine possessions centered on Lauchstädt, but they were later lost, becoming integrated into the Prince-Bishopric of Merseburg, and reintegrated again into the Wettin domains in 1565.

In 1363, a Palatinate of Saxony-Allstedt is mentioned for the first time, and it was later confirmed as the Wettin possession in 1425, by emperor Sigismund. Since the 15th century, the House of Wettin also claimed the Palatinate of Thuringia (German: Pfalzgrafschaft Thüringen), a newly coined designation, created in order to strengthen Wetting claims over several minor regions between their Thuringian and Saxon domains, thus leading to the inclusion of not only Saxon-palatine, but also Thuringian-palatine symbols into the Wettin coats of arms.

== Electorate of Saxony (1356–1806) ==
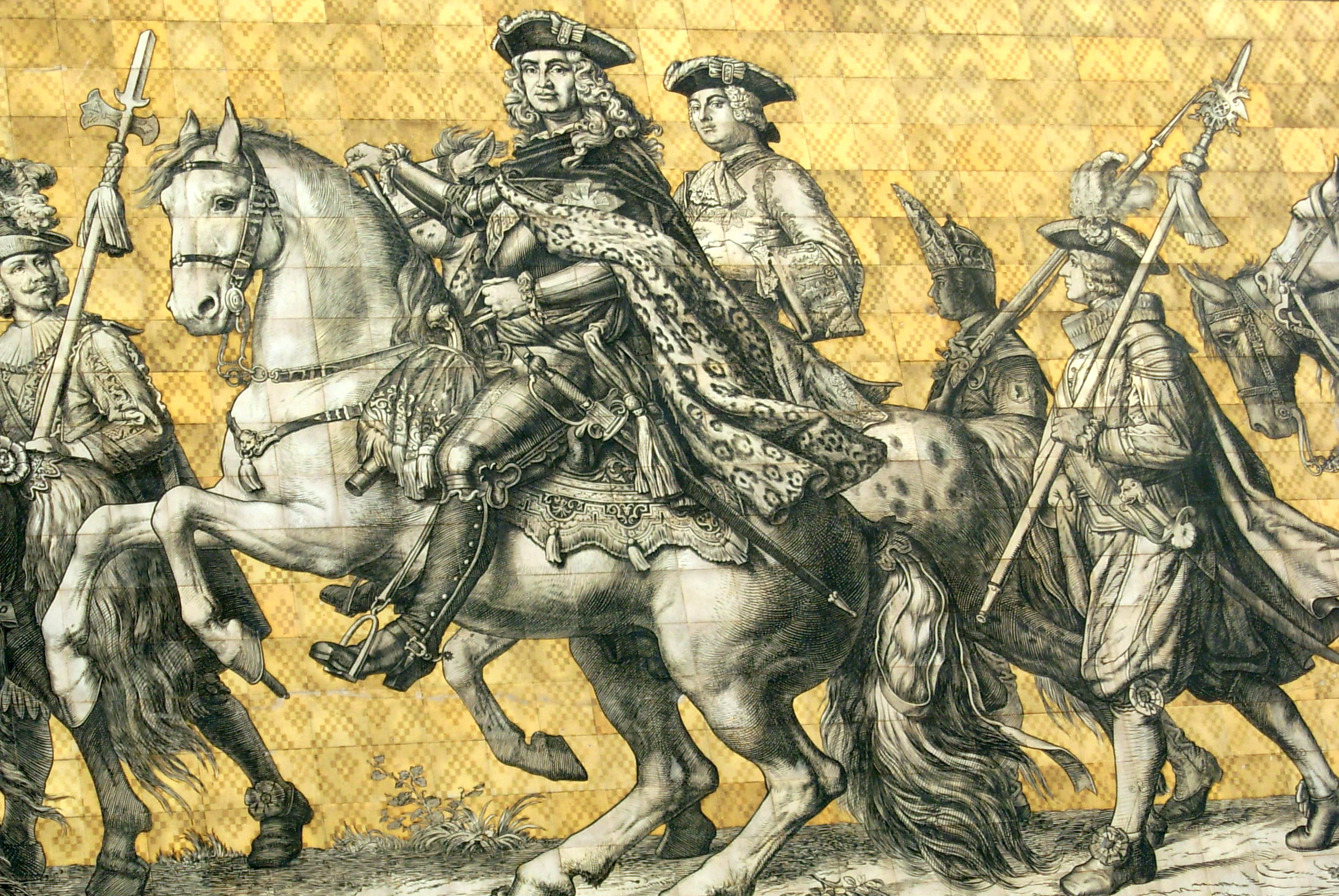
Kings of Poland and Electors of Saxony; Augustus II in the foreground and Augustus III behind him as depicted on Fürstenzug mural in Dresden

After the dissolution of the medieval Duchy of Saxony, the name Saxony was first applied to a small part of the duchy situated on the Elbe around the city of Wittenberg. When in 1356 the Holy Roman Emperor Charles IV issued the Golden Bull, the fundamental law of the empire which settled the method of electing the emperor, the Duchy of Saxe-Wittenberg was made one of the seven electorates and promoted to become the Electorate of Saxony. This lent influence out of proportion to the small area of the state. In addition, electoral status required succession based on primogeniture, which precluded the division of the territory among several heirs and the consequent disintegration of the country.

In 1485, Saxony was split in the Treaty of Leipzig. Ernest kept the Saxon electoral title (attached to the Duchy of Saxe-Wittenberg) and several domains in southern parts of Thuringia. The territories in Thuringia later developed into the Ernestine duchies. Since these princes were allowed to use the Saxon coat of arms, in many towns of Thuringia, the coat of arms can still be found in historical buildings. Albert received the Saxon ducal title and rule over the old Margraviate of Meissen, together with various domains in northern parts of Thuringia. He established Dresden as the capital of the newly established Duchy of Saxony.

Following the Imperial reform of 1500, both the Electorate and the Duchy of Saxony became part of the Saxon Circle of the Holy Roman Empire, and after the division of that circle in 1512 formed part of the Upper Saxon Circle.

As a result of the Capitulation of Wittenberg, the Electorate of Saxony and its core territory (the Duchy of Saxe-Wittenberg) passed from the elder Ernestine branch of the Saxon ruling House of Wettin, to the cadet Albertine branch, headed by duke Maurice, Duke of Saxony, who became the first Saxon prince-elector from the Albertine line.

The Protestant Reformation of the 16th century began under the protection of the electors of Saxony – in 1517, Martin Luther posted his 95 Theses at the castle church of Wittenberg. The electorate remained a focal point of religious strife throughout the Reformation and to the subsequent Thirty Years' War.

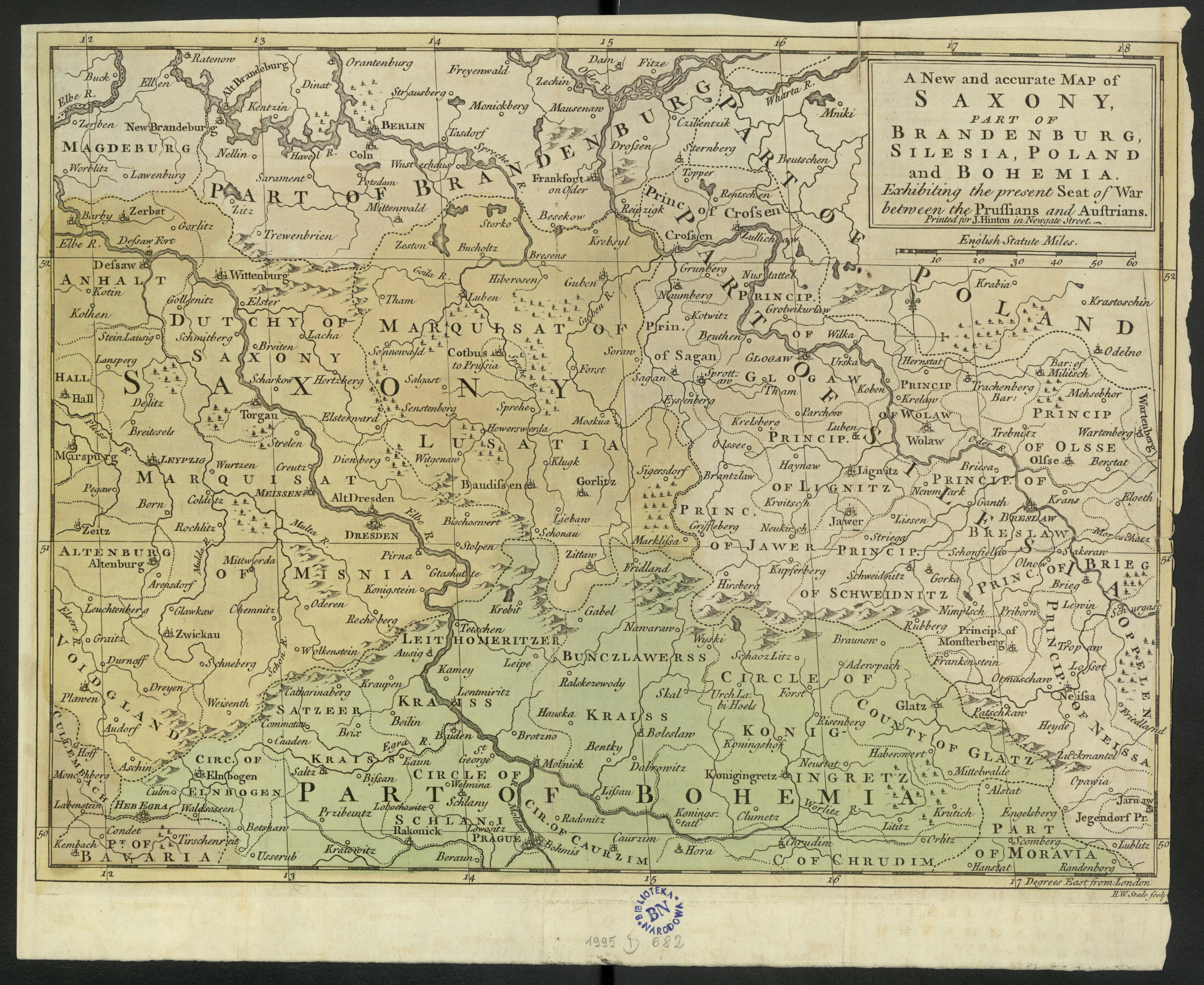
A Map of Saxony exhibiting the current "Seat of War" between the Prussians and Austrians, by J. Hinton 1756

Following the Thirty Years' War, Saxony's rulers and population were Lutheran. However, in the 18th century Frederick Augustus I converted to Roman Catholicism to be crowned King of Poland as Augustus II. The Polish-Saxon union and dual state continued until the death of Augustus III in 1763. Throughout this time, the population of Saxony remained largely Protestant. Many landmarks in Saxony date from this period and contain remnants of the Polish-Saxon dual state, such as the coat of arms of the Polish–Lithuanian Commonwealth on the facades and in the interiors of palaces, churches, edifices, etc. (e.g. Zwinger, Dresden Cathedral, Moritzburg Castle), and on numerous mileposts, and the close political and cultural relationship persisted well into the 19th century, with Saxony being the place of preparations for the Polish Kościuszko Uprising against the partitioning powers, and one of the chief destinations for Polish refugees from partitioned Poland, including the artistic and political elite, such as composer Frédéric Chopin, war hero Józef Bem and writer Adam Mickiewicz.

In 1756, Saxony joined the coalition of Austria, France and Russia against Prussia. Frederick II of Prussia chose to attack pre-emptively and invaded Saxony in August 1756, precipitating the Seven Years' War. The Prussians quickly defeated Saxony and incorporated the Saxon army into the Prussian army. They made the mistake of keeping their units intact rather than mixing them up. Whole Saxon units deserted. At the end of the Seven Years' War, Saxony once again became an independent state.

When in 1806 Napoleon I's French Empire began a war with Prussia, Saxony at first allied itself to Prussia, but afterwards joined Napoleon and entered the Confederation of the Rhine and the electorate became the Kingdom of Saxony with Elector Frederick Augustus III becoming King Frederick Augustus I.

== Kingdom of Saxony (1806–1918) ==
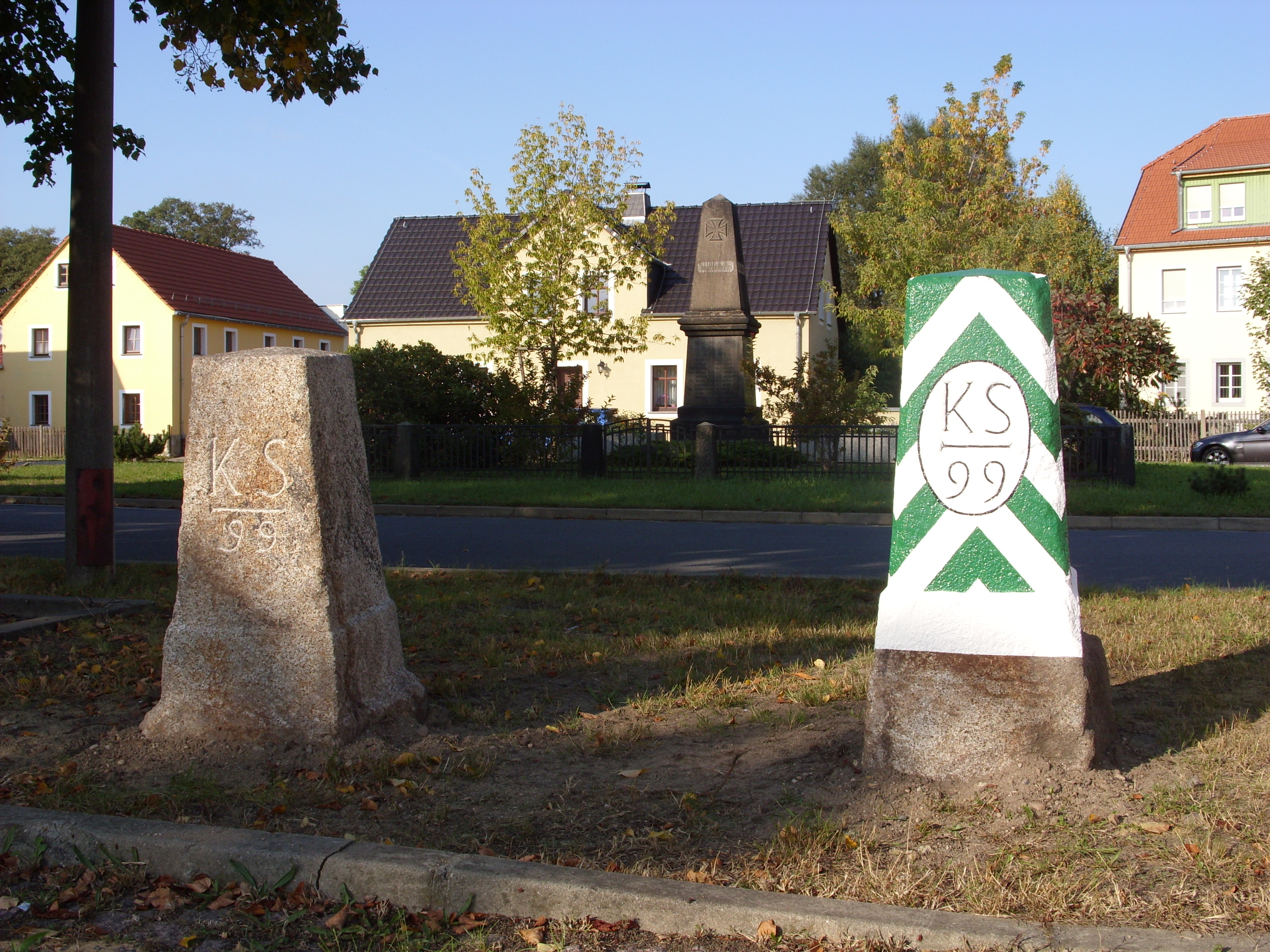
Historic boundary stones of Saxony and Prussia in Königswartha

The new kingdom was an ally of France in all the Napoleonic Wars of the years 1807–1813. At the beginning of the great German Campaign of 1813 the king sided neither with Napoleon nor with his allied opponents, but united his troops with those of France when Napoleon threatened to treat Saxony as a hostile country. At the Battle of Leipzig (16–18 October 1813), when Napoleon was completely defeated, the greater part of the Saxon troops deserted to the allied forces. The King of Saxony was taken as a Prussian prisoner to the Castle of Friedrichsfeld near Berlin. The Congress of Vienna (1814–15) took from Saxony the greater part of its land and gave it to Prussia, namely 7,800 square miles (20,000 km^{2}) with about 850,000 inhabitants; this ceded territory included the former Duchy of Saxe-Wittenberg, the former possessions of the Dioceses of Merseburg and Naumburg, a large part of Lusatia, etc. What Prussia had obtained, with the addition of some old Prussian districts, was formed into the Province of Saxony.

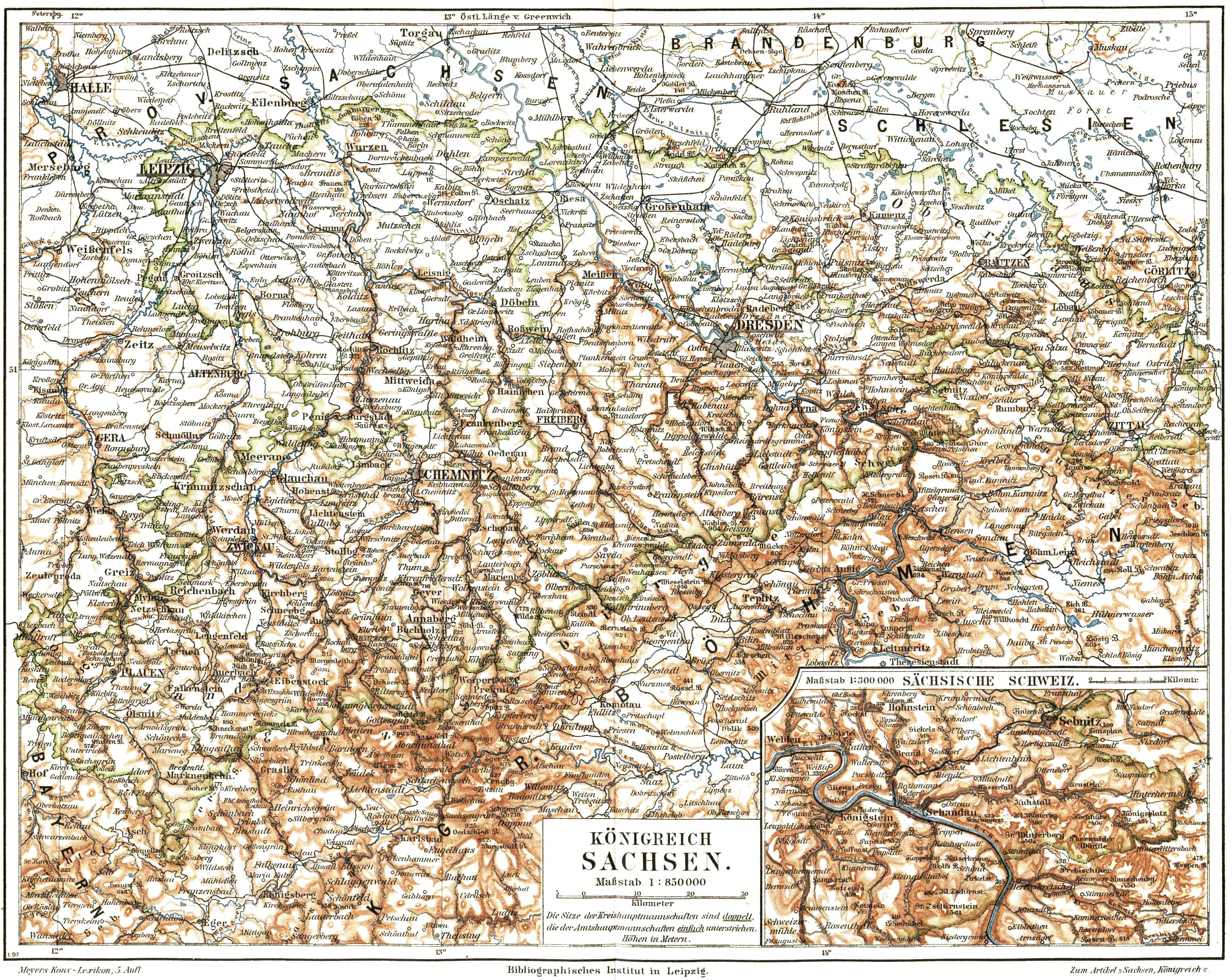
Kingdom of Saxony in 1895

The Kingdom of Saxony had left only an area of 5,789 square miles (14,990 km^{2}) with a population at that era of 1,500,000 inhabitants; under these conditions it became a member of the German Confederation that was founded in 1815. King John (1854–73) sided with Austria in the struggle between Prussia and Austria as to the supremacy in Germany. Consequently, in the Austro-Prussian War, when Prussia was successful, the independence of Saxony was once more in danger; only the intervention of the Austrian Emperor saved Saxony from being entirely absorbed by Prussia. The kingdom, however, was obliged to join the North German Confederation of which Prussia was the head. In 1871 Saxony became one of the states of the newly founded German Empire.

Saxony ranked as the most industrialised state in Europe by 1871, second only to Belgium. Census figures from that year recorded 52% of the population employed in industry and crafts and 10% in trade and transportation, with agriculture accounting for just 16%. The fifth largest state of the German Empire by area and third by population, it was the most densely populated state in Europe.

King John was followed by his son King Albert (1873–1902); Albert was succeeded by his brother George (1902–04); the son of George is King Frederick Augustus III. Prince Maximilian (born 1870), a brother of the king, became a priest in 1896, was engaged in parish work in London and Nuremberg, and since 1900 has been a professor of canon law and liturgy in the University of Freiburg in Switzerland.

In 1910 the average population per square km was 320. The population amounted to 5,302,485; of whom 218,033 were Catholics; 4,250,398 Evangelical Lutherans; 14,697 Jews; and a small proportion of other denominations.

== Prussian province of Saxony ==
The Prussian Province of Saxony was formed in 1815 from the territories, about 8,100 square miles (21,000 km^{2}) in extent, ceded by the Kingdom of Saxony, with the addition of some districts already belonging to Prussia, the most important of which are the Altmark, from which the State of Prussia sprang; the former immediate principalities of the Archbishopric of Magdeburg and of the Bishopric of Halberstadt, which Prussia had received by the Peace of Westphalia (1648) at the close of the Thirty Years' War; and the Eichsfeld, with the city of Erfurt and its surroundings.

The province had an area of 9,746 square miles (25,240 km^{2}), and in 1905 had 2,979,221 inhabitants. Of its population 230,860 (7.8%) were Catholic, 2,730,098 (91%) were Protestant; 9,981 hold other forms of Christian faith, and 8,050 were Jews. During the summer months about 15,000 to 20,000 Catholic labourers, called Sachsengänger, came into the country; they were Poles from the Prussian Province of Posen, from Russian Poland, or Galicia. The province was divided into the three government departments of Magdeburg, Merseburg and Erfurt.

Up to 1802 the Eichsfeld and Erfurt had belonged to the principality of the Archbishopric of Mainz; a large part of the population had therefore retained the Catholic faith during the Reformation. As regards ecclesiastical affairs the Province of Saxony had been assigned to the Diocese of Paderborn by the papal bull De salute animarum of 16 July 1821.

The province contained three ecclesiastical administrative divisions: the episcopal commissariat of Magdeburg that embraced the entire governmental department of Magdeburg and consisted of four deaneries and 25 parishes; the "ecclesiastical Court" of Erfurt, which included the governmental Department of Merseburg and the eastern half of the governmental Department of Erfurt; and consisted of 2 deaneries (Halle and Erfurt) and 28 parishes; the episcopal commissariat of Heiligenstadt, which embraced the western half of the governmental department of Erfurt, that is called the Upper Eichsfeld, and consisted of 16 deaneries and 129 parishes.

== Weimar Republic to Nazi Germany ==
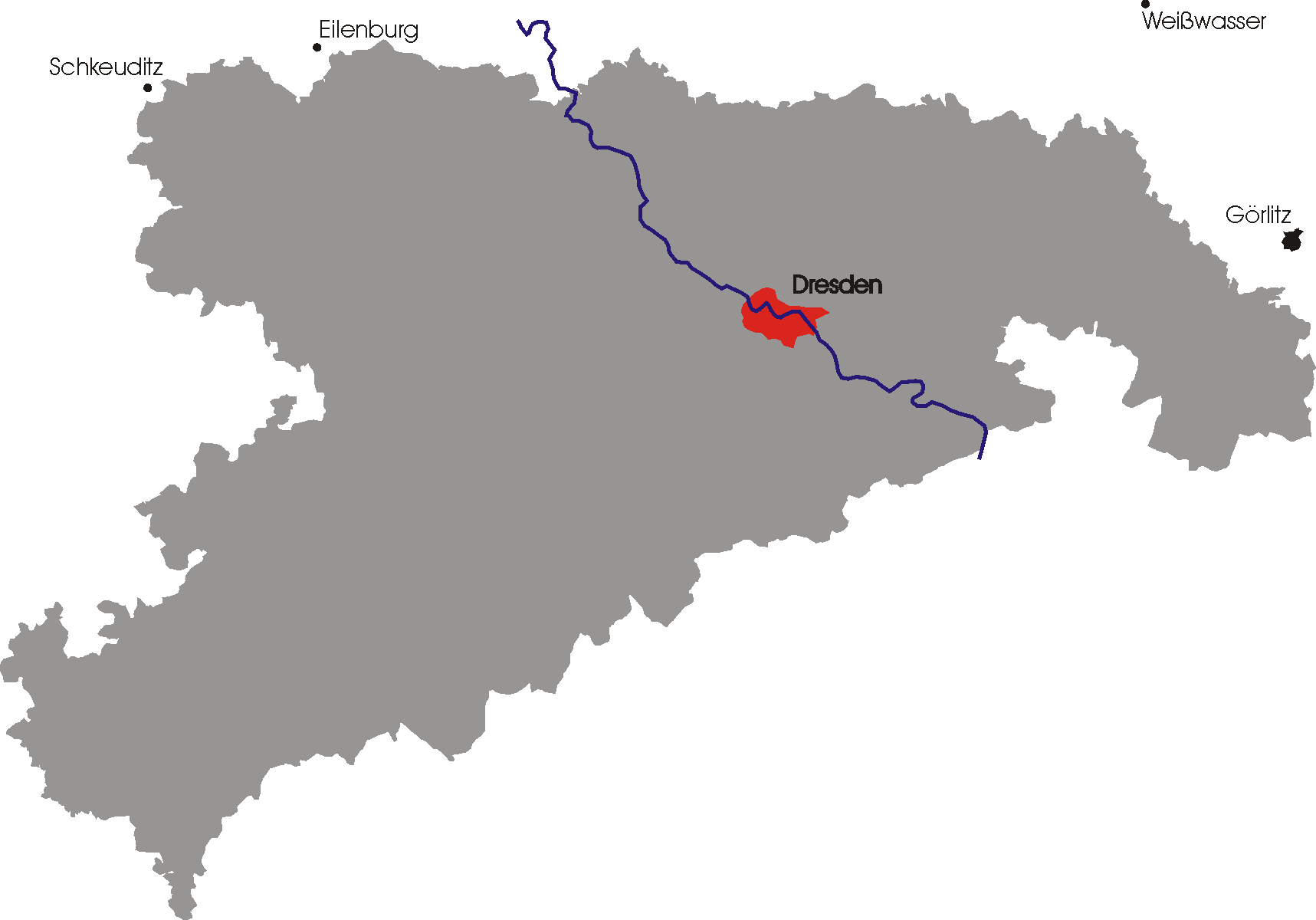
The Free State of Saxony in 1930

After 1918 Saxony was a state in the Weimar Republic. In October 1923, when the Communist Party of Germany entered the Social Democratic-led government in Dresden with hidden revolutionary intentions, the Reich government under Chancellor Gustav Stresemann used a Reichsexekution to send troops into Saxony to remove the Communists from the government. Saxony continued to exist during the Nazi era and under Soviet occupation.

During World War II, under the secret Nazi programme Aktion T4, an estimated 15,000 people suffering from mental and physical disabilities, as well as a number of concentration camp inmates, were murdered at Sonnenstein Euthanasia Centre near Pirna. Numerous subcamps of the Buchenwald, Flossenburg and Gross-Rosen concentration camps were operated in Saxony.

As the war drew to its end, U.S. troops under General George Patton occupied the western part of Saxony in April 1945, while Soviet troops occupied the eastern part. That summer, the entire state was handed over to Soviet forces as agreed in the London Protocol of September 1944. Britain, the US, and the USSR then negotiated Germany's future at the Potsdam Conference.

== Soviet occupation and German Democratic Republic ==
The State of Saxony within the Soviet occupation zone in Germany and later the German Democratic Republic. (1945–1952)

Under the Potsdam Agreement, all German territory East of the Oder-Neisse line was annexed by Poland and the Soviet Union, and, unlike in the aftermath of World War I, the annexing powers were allowed to expel the inhabitants. During the following three years, Poland and Czechoslovakia expelled German-speaking people from their territories, and some of these expellees came to Saxony. Only a small area of Saxony lying east of the Neisse River and centred around the town of Reichenau (Bogatynia) was annexed by Poland. Traditional close relations of Saxony with neighbouring German-speaking Egerland were thus completely destroyed, making the border of Saxony along the Ore Mountains a linguistic border.

Part of the former Prussian province of Lower Silesia lay west of the Oder-Neisse line and therefore was separated from the bulk of its former province; the Soviet Military Administration in Germany (SVAG) merged this territory into Saxony. This former Silesian territory broadly corresponded with the Upper Lusatian territory annexed by Prussia in 1815.

On 20 October 1946, SVAG organised elections for the Saxon state parliament (Landtag), but many people were arbitrarily excluded from candidacy and suffrage, and the Soviet Union openly supported the Socialist Unity Party of Germany (SED). The new minister-president Rudolf Friedrichs (SED), had been a member of the SPD until April 1946. He met his Bavarian counterparts in the U.S. zone of occupation in October 1946 and May 1947, but died suddenly in mysterious circumstances the following month. He was succeeded by Max Seydewitz, a loyal follower of Joseph Stalin.

The German Democratic Republic (East Germany), including Saxony, was established in 1949 out of the Soviet zone of Occupied Germany, becoming a constitutionally socialist state, part of COMECON and the Warsaw Pact, under the leadership of the SED. In 1952 the government abolished the Free State of Saxony, and divided its territory into three Bezirke: Leipzig, Dresden, and Karl-Marx-Stadt (formerly and currently Chemnitz). Areas around Hoyerswerda were also part of the Cottbus Bezirk.

== After German reunification ==
The Free State of Saxony was reconstituted with slightly altered borders in 1990, following German reunification. Besides the formerly Silesian area of Saxony, which was mostly included in the territory of the new Saxony, the free state gained further areas north of Leipzig that had belonged to Saxony-Anhalt until 1952.

== See also ==
- Electorate of Saxony
- Lower Saxony – partial modern successor State in Germany
- Ottonian dynasty
- Rulers of Saxony
- Wettin (dynasty)

History of cities in Saxony

- Timeline of Chemnitz
- Timeline of Dresden
- Timeline of Leipzig

== Sources ==
- Althoff, Gerd (1999). "Saxony and the Elbe Slavs in the Tenth Century". The New Cambridge Medieval History. Vol. 3. Cambridge: Cambridge University Press. pp. 267–292.
- Bachrach, Bernard S.; Bachrach, David S., eds. (2014). Widukind of Corvey: Deeds of the Saxons. Washington: The Catholic University of America Press.
- Blaschke, Karlheinz (2002). "Die Leipziger Teilung der wettinischen Länder von 1485". Beiträge zur Verfassungs- und Verwaltungsgeschichte Sachsens: Ausgewählte Aufsätze von Karlheinz Blaschke. Leipzig: Leipziger Universitätsverlag. pp. 323–335.
- Goldberg, Eric J. (2006). Struggle for Empire: Kingship and Conflict under Louis the German, 817-876. Ithaca: Cornell University Press.
- Groß, Reiner (2007). Die Wettiner. Stuttgart: Kohlhammer Verlag.
- Retallack, James (2000). "Locating Saxony in the Landscape of German Regional History". Saxony in German History: Culture, Society, and Politics, 1830-1933. Ann Arbor: The University of Michigan Press. pp. 1–30.
- Retallack, James N. (2017). Red Saxony: Election Battles and the Spectre of Democracy in Germany, 1860–1918. United Kingdom: Oxford University Press.
- Reuter, Timothy (2013) [1991]. Germany in the Early Middle Ages c. 800–1056. London and New York: Routledge.
- Stieldorf, Andrea (2026) [2012]. Marken und Markgrafen: Studien zur Grenzsicherung durch die fränkisch-deutschen Herrscher (2nd ed.). Wiesbaden: Harrassowitz Verlag.
- Tebruck, Stefan (2005). "Zwischen Integration und Selbstbehauptung: Thüringen im wettinischen Herrschaftsbereich". Fragen der politischen Integration im mittelalterlichen Europa. Ostfildern: Jan Thorbecke Verlag. pp. 375–412, 589–591.
- Trillmich, Werner, ed. (1957). Thietmar von Merseburg: Chronik. Darmstadt: Wissenschaftliche Buchgesellschaf.
- Warner, David A., ed. (2001). Ottonian Germany: The Chronicon of Thietmar of Merseburg. Manchester and New York: Manchester University Press.
- Wilson, Peter H. (2016). Heart of Europe: A History of the Holy Roman Empire. Cambridge: Harvard University Press.
- Turner, Sharon: The History of the Anglo-Saxons, From the Earliest Period to the Norman Conquest, Vol. i. (London, 1852).
