= Capitulation of Wittenberg =

1547 treaty

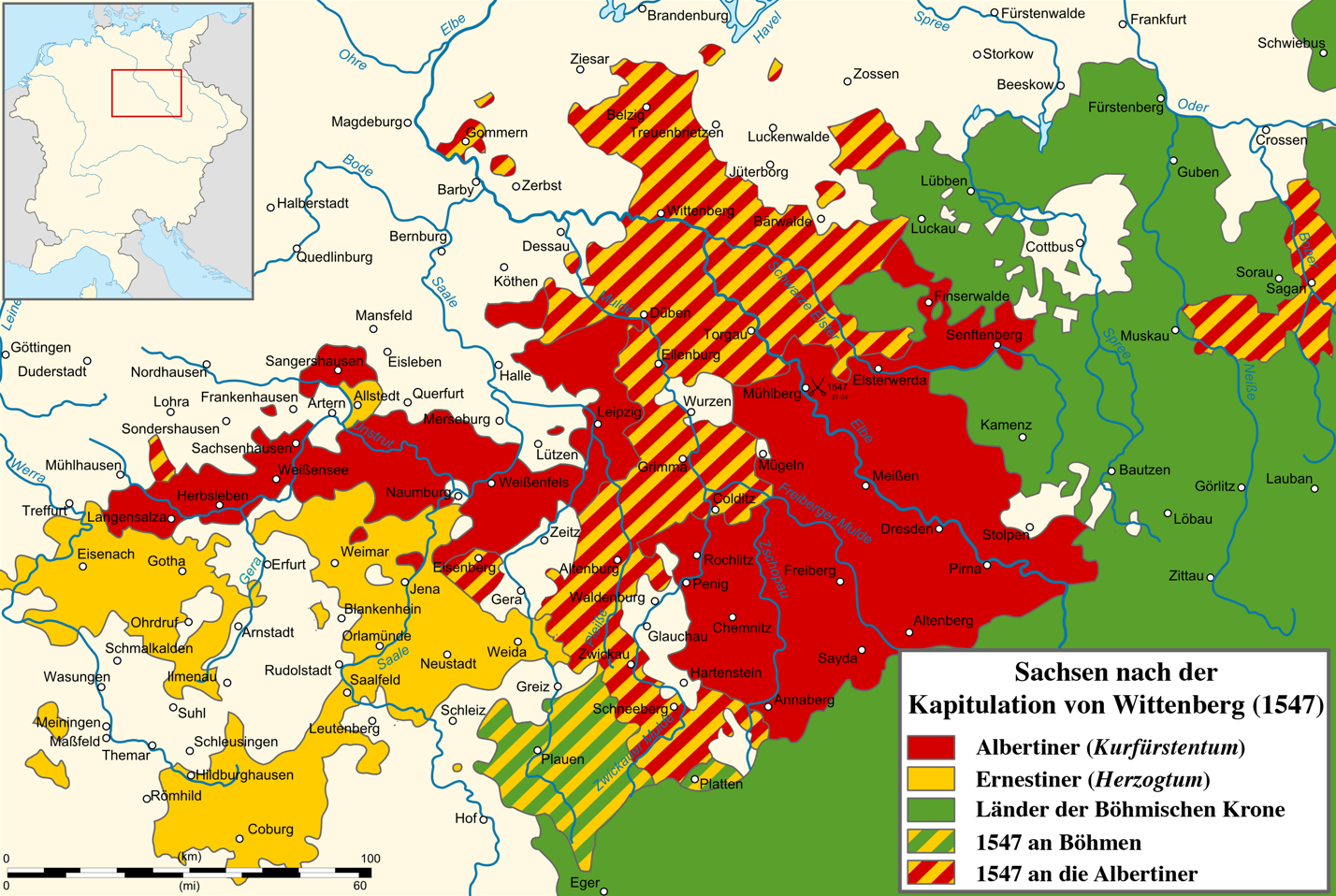
Redistribution of Wettin lands upon the Capitulation of Wittenberg (1547)

The Capitulation of Wittenberg (German: Wittenberger Kapitulation) was a treaty concluded on 19 May 1547 in the city of Wittenberg, by which John Frederick I, Elector of Saxony (d. 1554), was compelled to resign the offices and titles of Prince-Elector and Arch-Marshal of the Holy Roman Empire. The Electorate of Saxony and its core territory (the Duchy of Saxe-Wittenberg) thus passed from the elder Ernestine branch of the Saxon ruling House of Wettin, to the cadet Albertine branch, headed by duke Maurice (d. 1553), who became the first Saxon prince-elector from the Albertine line.

== History ==
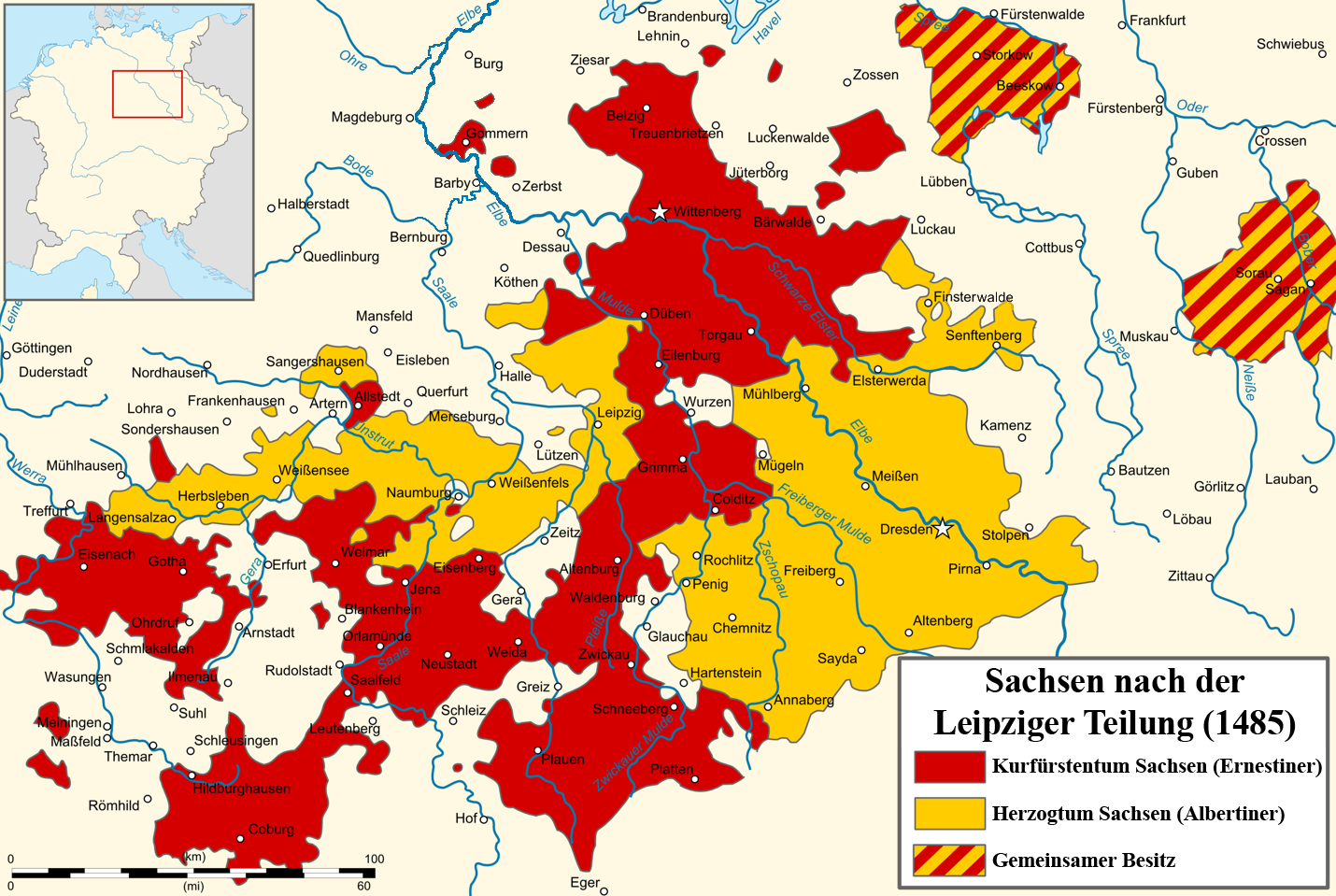
Previous division of Wettinian domains, by the Treaty of Leipzig (1485)

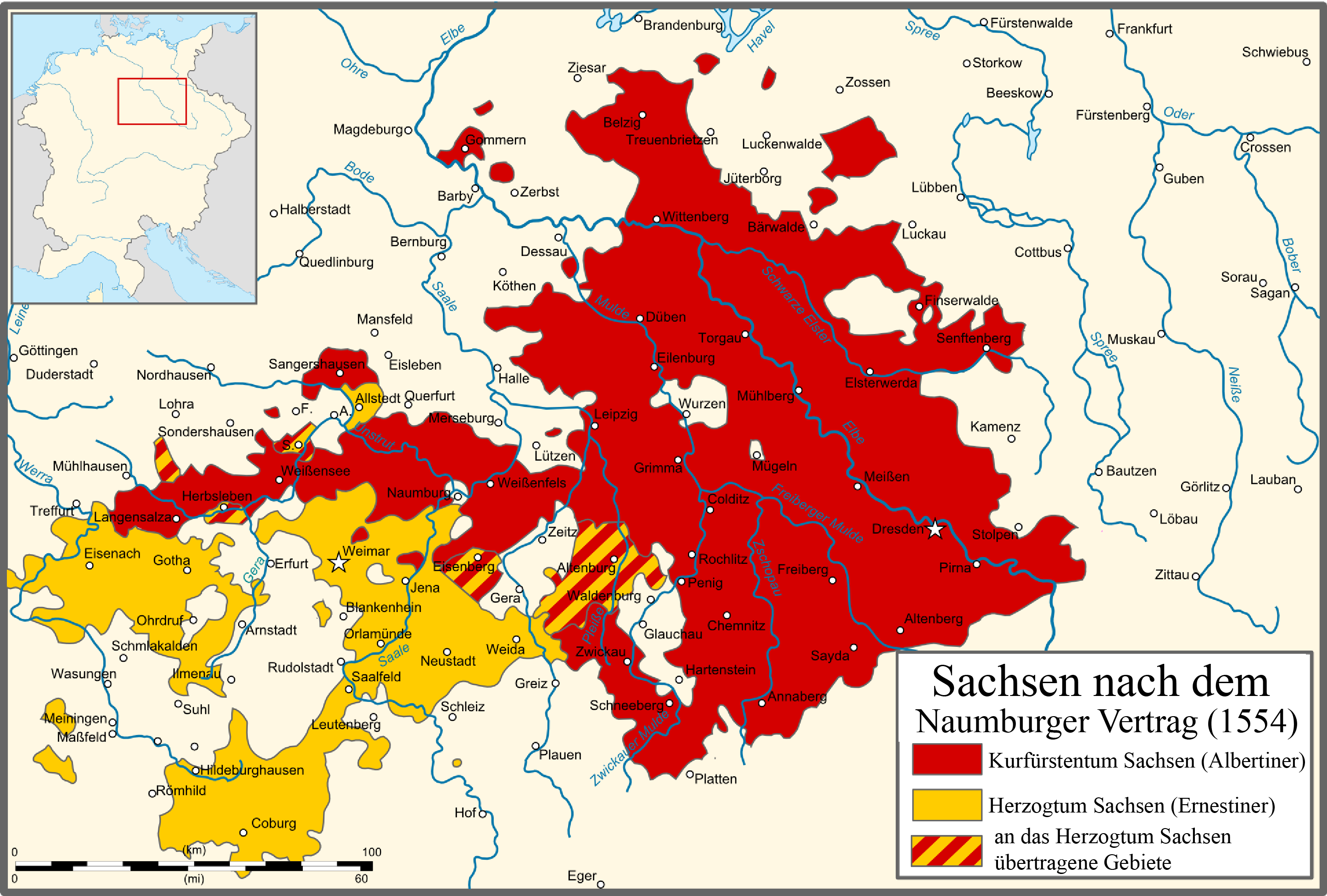
Later redistribution of Wettin lands upon the Treaty of Naumburg (1554)

Since the Treaty of Leipzig (1485), Wettinian domains had been divided between two dynastic branches, the senior Ernestines who held the princely electoral dignity, and the junior Albertines who ruled as dukes.

During the early stages of Reformation, the two Wettin branches were divided in their stances towards religious issues. While Ernestine Frederick III, Elector of Saxony (d. 1525) supported the Lutheran reformation, his Albertine cousin George, Duke of Saxony (d. 1539) attempted to prevent the spread of new religious movements. The Reformation gained foothold in the Albertine lands under George's brother and successor Henry IV, Duke of Saxony (d. 1541). Although his son and successor, the Albertine duke Maurice (d. 1553) was also a supporter of Lutheranism, in 1546 he sided with the Emperor Charles V against the Protestant princes of the Schmalkaldic League, that was headed by his Ernestine cousin John Frederick I, Elector of Saxony.

In 1547, during the Schmalkaldic War, Emperor Charles V, with the assistance of the Duke of Alba, captured Wittenberg after the Battle of Mühlberg, where John Frederick I was taken prisoner. The Duke of Alba then presided over a court-martial and condemned John Frederick to death. To save his life, the Elector conceded the defeat, and accepted the loss of his electoral post, and his sentence was thereupon commuted to imprisonment for life. Thus, the Capitulation of Wittenberg was concluded on 19 May 1547, transferring the Saxon electoral title to Maurice, together with large parts of the Ernestine lands (including the core Duchy of Saxe-Wittenberg). Those changes resulted in a radical territorial recomposition of the Electorate of Saxony.

John Frederick was released from imprisonment on 1 September 1552, with the imperial consent, and returned to the remaining Ernestine domains in a triumphal march, moving the seat of government to Weimar, while several unresolved issues between the two Wettin branches, Ernestines and Albertines, were later resolved by the Treaty of Naumburg (1554).

== See also ==
- History of Saxony
- Treaty of Leipzig (1485)
- Treaty of Naumburg (1554)

== Sources ==
- Blaschke, Karlheinz (2002). "Die Leipziger Teilung der wettinischen Länder von 1485". Beiträge zur Verfassungs- und Verwaltungsgeschichte Sachsens: Ausgewählte Aufsätze von Karlheinz Blaschke. Leipzig: Leipziger Universitätsverlag. pp. 323–335.
- Groß, Reiner (2007). Die Wettiner. Stuttgart: Kohlhammer Verlag.
- Tebruck, Stefan (2005). "Zwischen Integration und Selbstbehauptung: Thüringen im wettinischen Herrschaftsbereich". Fragen der politischen Integration im mittelalterlichen Europa. Ostfildern: Jan Thorbecke Verlag. pp. 375–412, 589–591.
- Wilson, Peter H. (2016). Heart of Europe: A History of the Holy Roman Empire. Cambridge: Harvard University Press.
