= Albertine Wettins =

Branch of the German House of Wettin

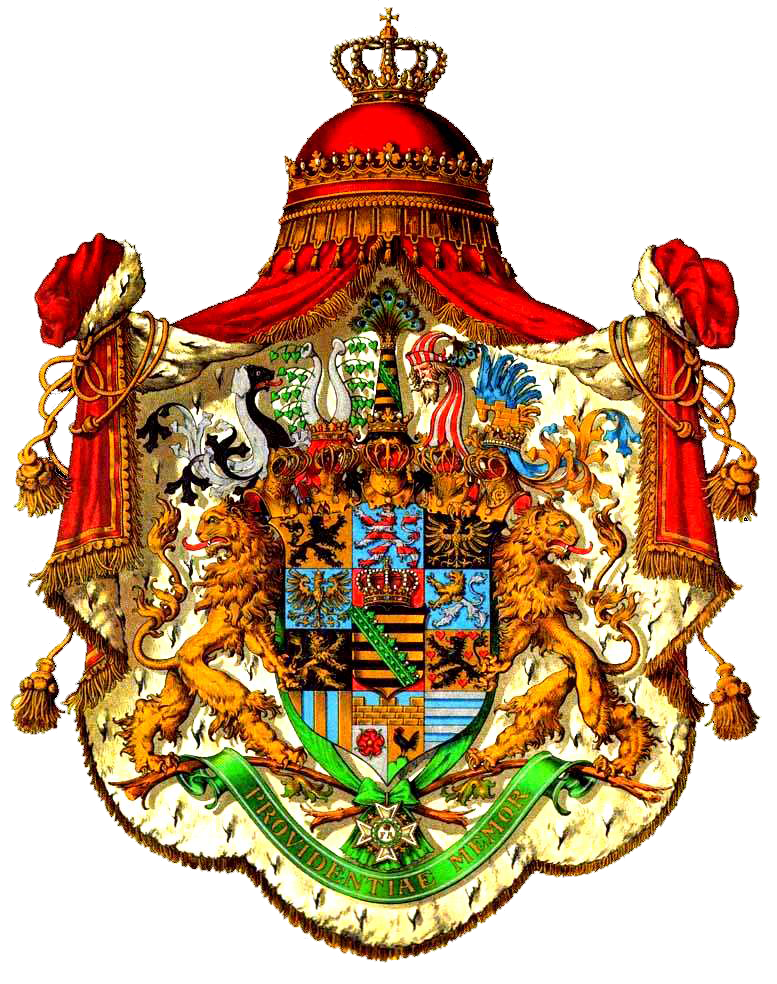
Coat of arms of the House of Wettin, Albertine line

The Albertine branch is a German princely line of the House of Wettin. It is named after its founder, Albert III, Duke of Saxony (d. 1500). It emerged from the dynastic division between duke Albert and his older brother Ernest, Elector of Saxony (d. 1486), founder of the elder Ernestine branch. Regulated by the Treaty of Leipzig (1485), the division of domains and titles between two brothers led to the creation of separate Wettin branches and their distinctive states within the Holy Roman Empire. From 1485 to 1918, the Albertines ruled various parts of Saxony as dukes (from 1485), electors (1547), and kings (from 1806). In time, the Alberines branched further, thus creating several distinctive duchies for secondary lines, while members of the main (electoral) line also ruled as Kings of Poland and Grand Dukes of Lithuania (1697-1763).

== History ==
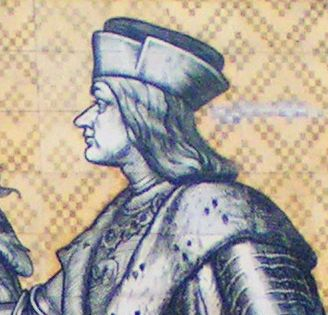
Albert III, Duke of Saxony, the first Albertine

Upon death of Frederick II, Elector of Saxony in 1464, his sons Ernest and Albert initially ruled their inherited lands jointly, with Ernest, the elder brother, holding the electoral title. In 1485, the brothers concluded the Treaty of Leipzig and divided lands and titles: Ernest kept the Saxon electoral office (attached to the Duchy of Saxe-Wittenberg) and various domains in southern parts of Thuringia, while Albert received ducal title and rule over the old Margraviate of Meissen, together with several domains in northern parts of Thuringia.

Thus, the Albertines ruled over their domains as Saxon dukes, from 1485 to 1547.

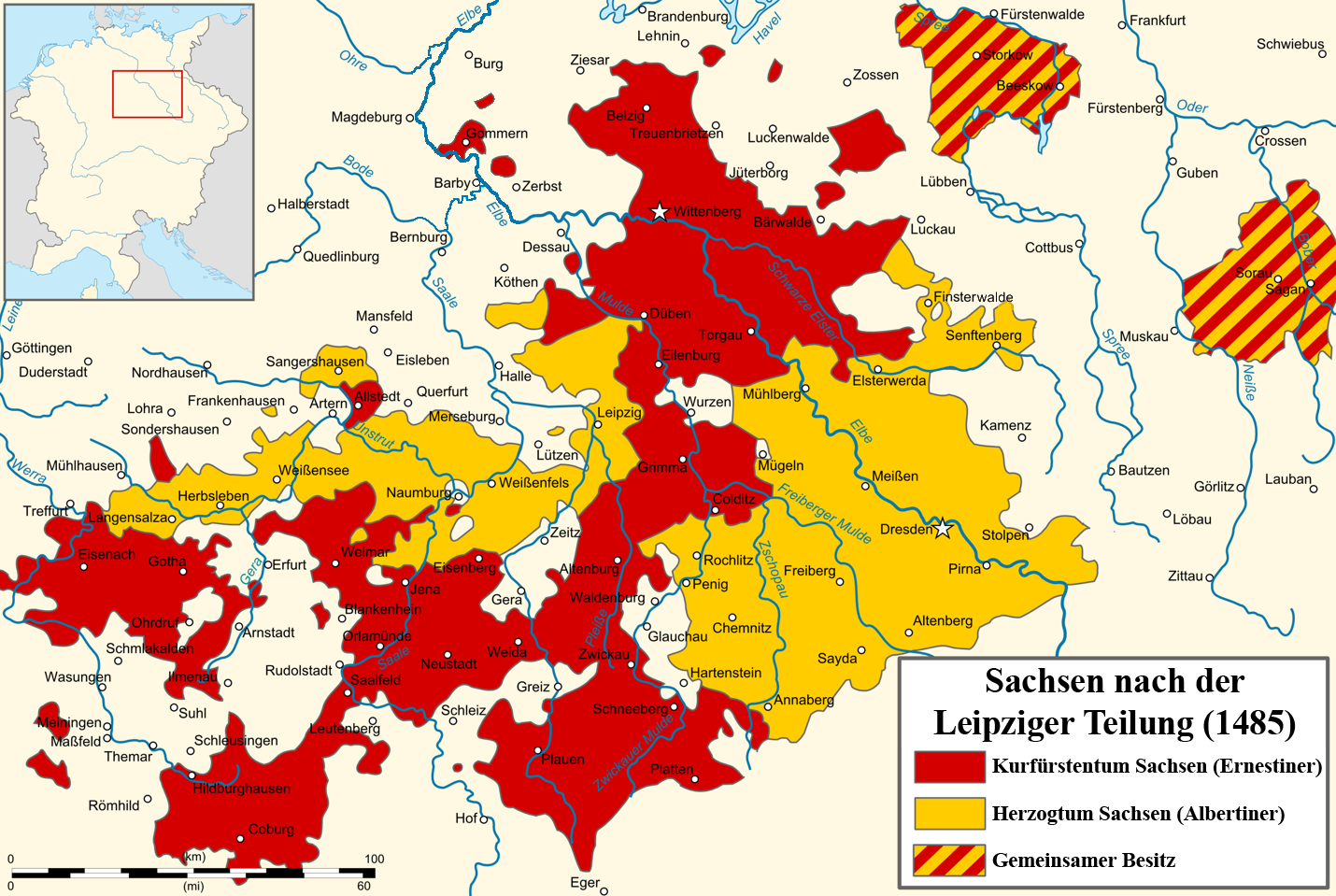
Albertine domains (yellow) upon the Treaty of Leipzig (1485)

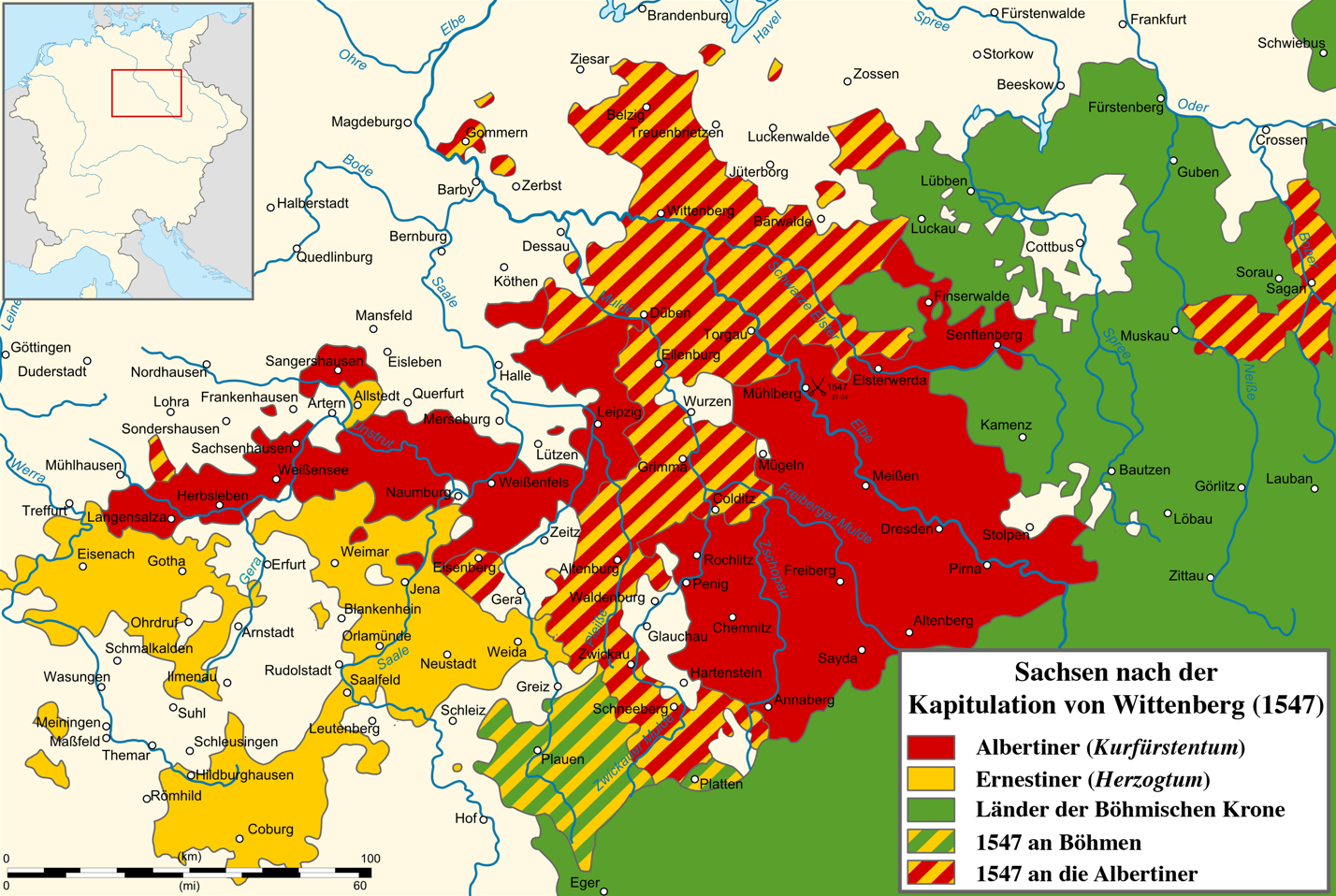
Albertine domains (red and shaded) upon the Capitulation of Wittenberg (1547)

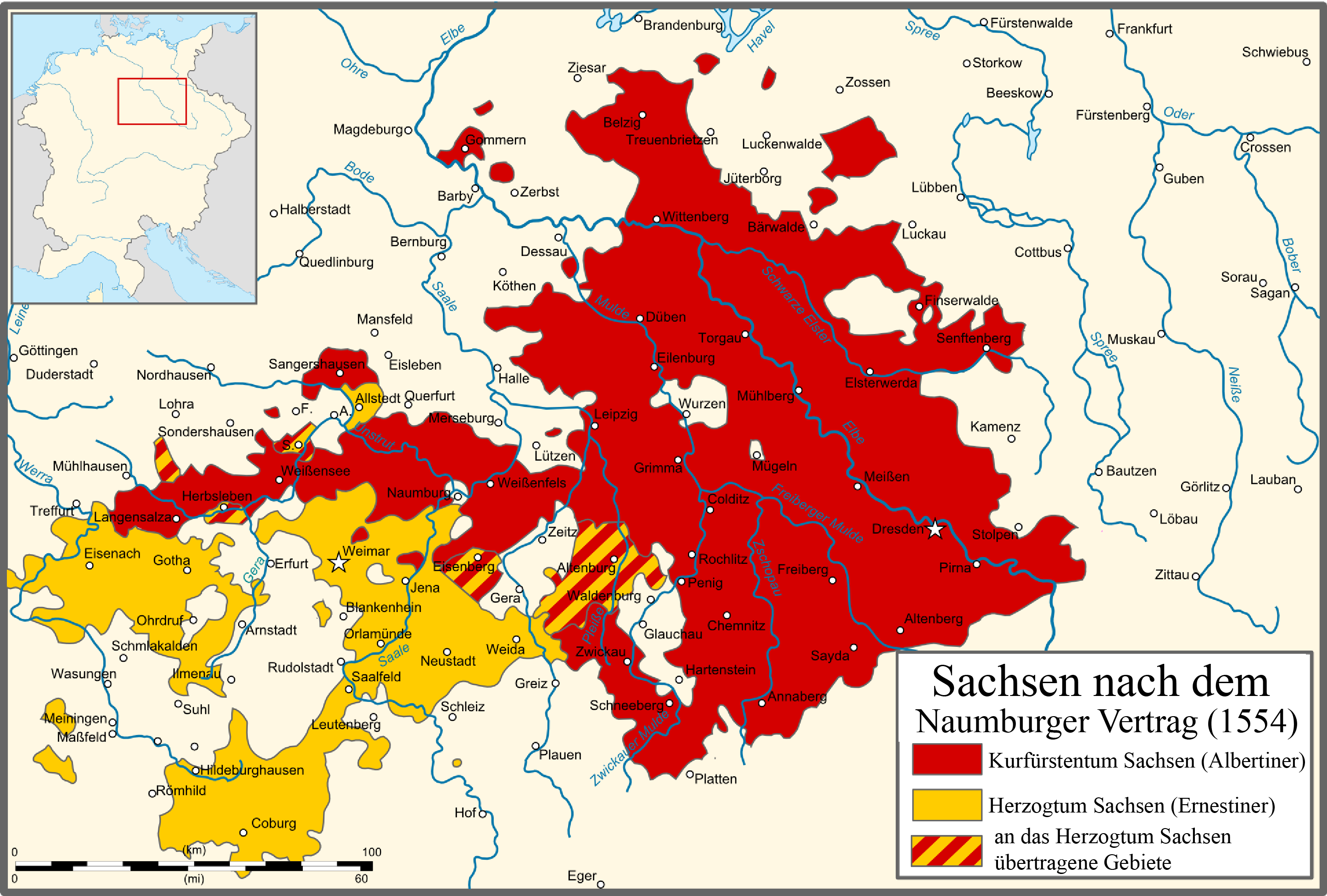
Albertine domains (red and shaded) upon the Treaty of Naumburg (1554)

=== Acquisition of the electoral dignity ===
During the early Reformation, the Wettin branches were divided in their stances. While Ernestine Frederick III, Elector of Saxony (d. 1525) supported the movement, his Albertine cousin George, Duke of Saxony (d. 1539) attempted to prevent its spread in his domains. The Reformation was only introduced in the Albertine lands under George's brother and successor Henry IV, Duke of Saxony (d. 1541). Although the Albertine duke Maurice (d. 1553) was also a Protestant, in 1546 he sided with Emperor Charles V against the Protestant princes of the Schmalkaldic League under the leadership of his Ernestine cousin John Frederick I, Elector of Saxony. After the defeat of the Protestants in the Schmalkaldic War, the Capitulation of Wittenberg was concluded in 1547, forcing John Frederick I to renounce the Saxon electoral office, that was transferred to Maurice, together with large parts of the Ernestine lands. That resulted in a radical territorial recomposition of the Electorate of Saxony, and since then, the Albertine branch became the more powerful line of the House of Wettin.

The common minting agreed between the Ernestine and Albertine branch in the main division of Leipzig in 1485 was finally abandoned after 1547, and the new Albertine Elector Moritz issued coins in his own name (Saxon coin separation).

== Family tree of the Albertine branch ==
House of Wettin
Margaret of Austria	Frederick II
Sidonie of Poděbrady	Albert III	Ernestine
Catherine of Mecklenburg	Henry IV	George, Duke of Saxony	Barbara Jagiellon
Anne of Denmark	Augustus, Elector of Saxony	Maurice, Elector of Saxony
Sophie of Brandenburg	Christian I, Elector of Saxony
Duchess Magdalene Sibylle of Prussia	John George I	Christian II
Margravine Magdalene Sibylle of Brandenburg-Bayreuth	John George II	Augustus, Duke of Saxe-Weissenfels (Founder of the Weißenfels branch, died out in 1746)	Christian I (Founder of the Merseburg branch, died out in 1738)	Maurice (Founder of the Zeitz branch, died out in 1718)
Princess Anna Sophie of Denmark	John George III
Christiane Eberhardine of Brandenburg-Bayreuth	Augustus II the Strong (born as August II, King of Poland)	John George IV	Eleonore Erdmuthe of Saxe-Eisenach
Maria Josepha of Austria	Augustus III of Poland (born as August III, King of Poland)
Duchess Maria Antonia of Bavaria	Frederick Christian
Princess Carolina of Parma	Maximilian, Hereditary Prince of Saxony (renounces the throne in 1830)	Frederick Augustus I of Saxony (since 1806 as Friedrich August I. King of Saxony)	Anthony of Saxony
Amalie Auguste of Bavaria	John of Saxony	Frederick Augustus II of Saxony
Infanta Maria Anna of Portugal	George, King of Saxony	Albert of Saxony
Archduchess Louise of Austria	Frederick Augustus III of Saxony
Georg, Crown Prince of Saxony	Friedrich Christian, Margrave of Meissen	Prince Ernst Heinrich of Saxony	Margarete Carola Wilhelmine	Maria Alix Luitpolda	Anna Pia Monika

== Sources ==
- Groß, Reiner (2007). Die Wettiner. Stuttgart: Kohlhammer Verlag.
- Wilson, Peter (2016). Heart of Europe: A History of the Holy Roman Empire. Cambridge: Harvard University Press.
