= Treaty of Leipzig =

1485 treaty dividing the Wettin lands of Saxony

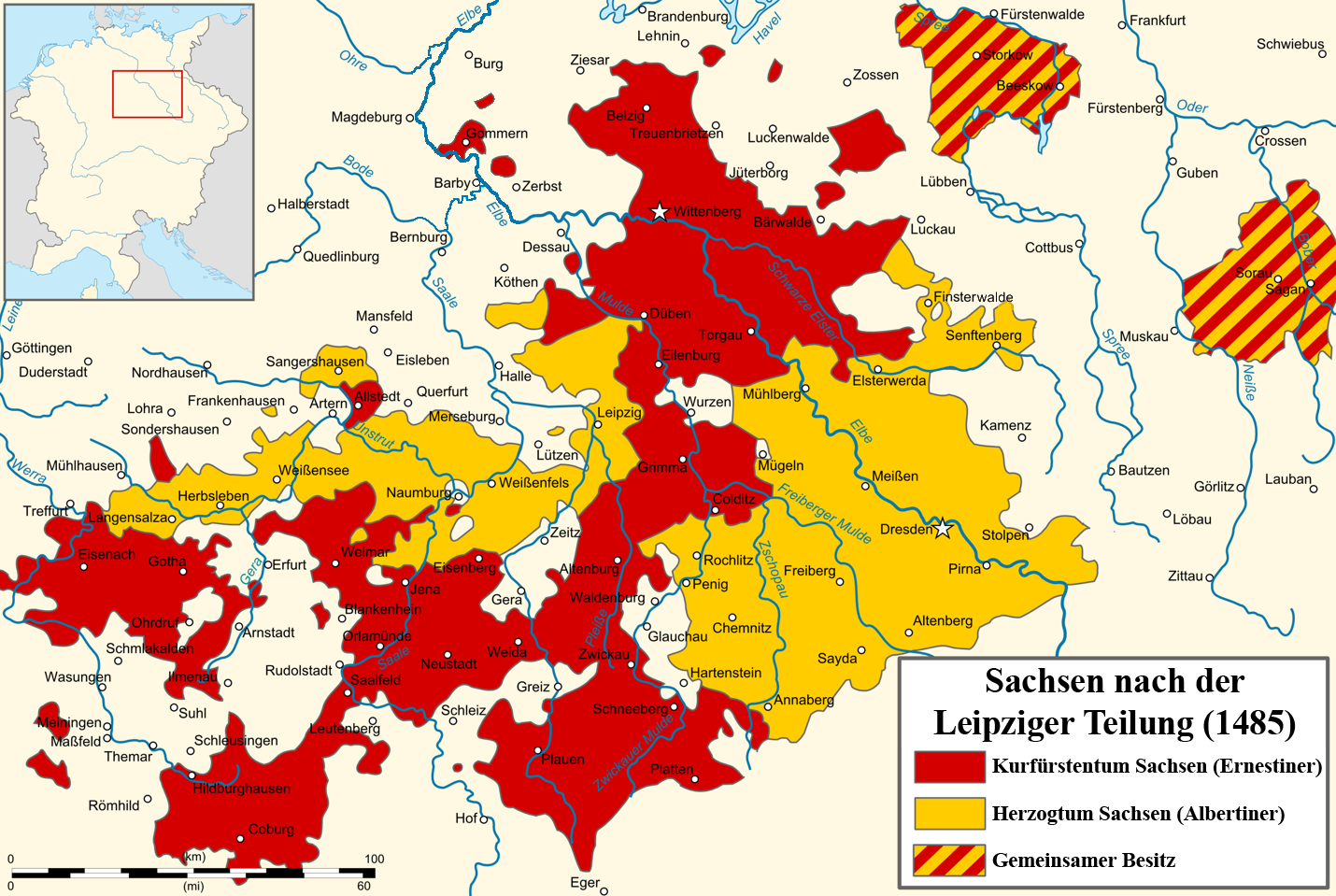
Wettin lands upon Leipzig partition: electoral lands of Ernest in red, ducal lands of Albert III in yellow, while shared lands are striped

The Treaty of Leipzig or Partition of Leipzig (German: Leipziger Teilung) was signed on 11 November 1485 in the city of Leipzig, between Ernest, Elector of Saxony and his younger brother Albert III, the sons and heirs of Frederick II, Elector of Saxony (d. 1464) from the House of Wettin. The treaty ended the period of joint rule by two brothers, that lasted from 1464 to 1485. Under the Leipzig treaty provisions, Ernest kept the Saxon electoral title (attached to the Duchy of Saxe-Wittenberg) and several domains in southern parts of Thuringia, while Albert received the Saxon ducal title and rule over the old Margraviate of Meissen, together with various domains in northern parts of Thuringia. The Leipzig treaty and its arrangements perpetuated the division of Wettin lands in two distinctive domains, administered separately, by rulers from Ernestine and Albertine branches of the dynasty.

== History ==
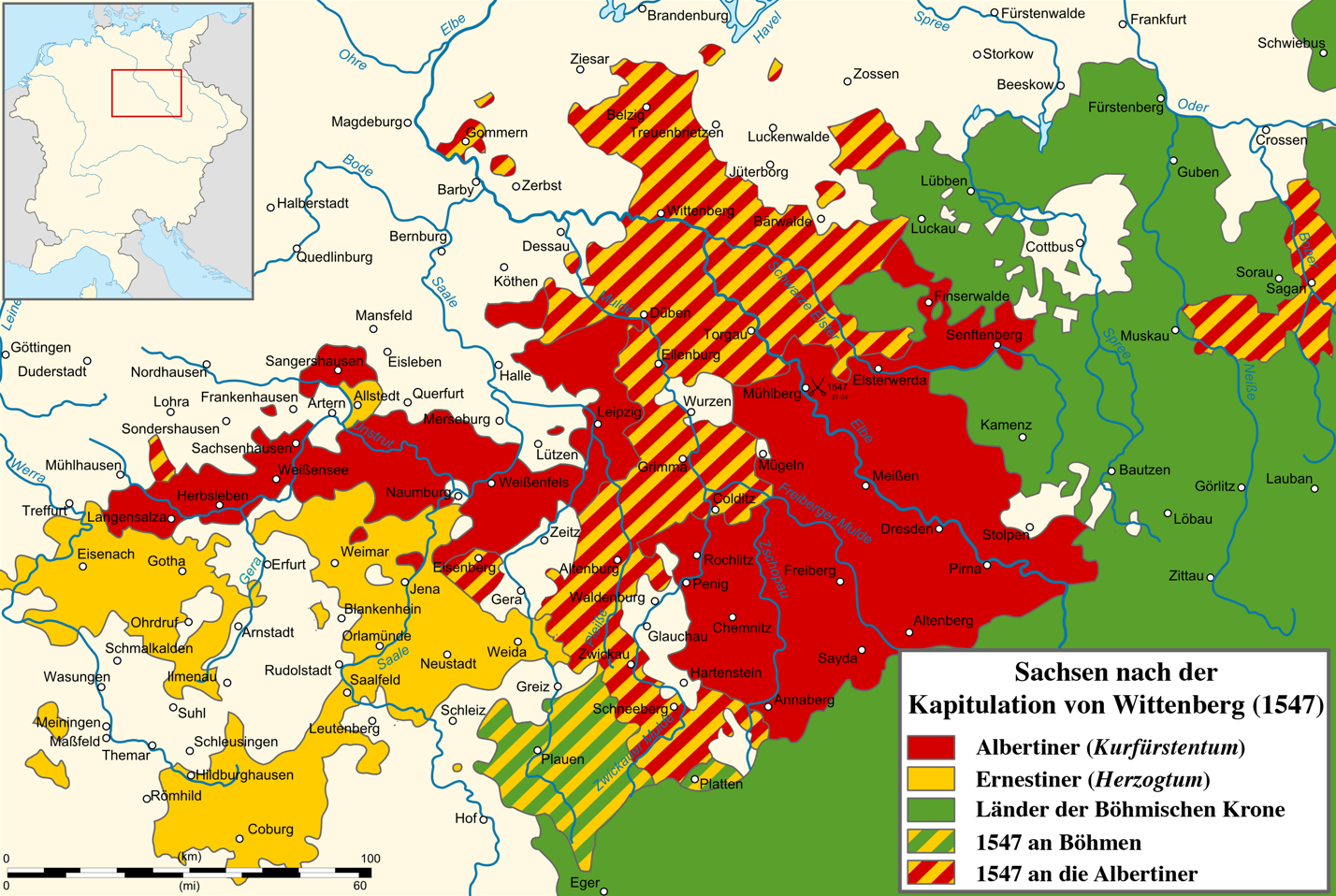
Later redistribution of Wettin lands upon the Capitulation of Wittenberg (1547)

In 1423 Ernest's and Albert's grandfather, Margrave Frederick IV of Meissen had received the Saxon Electorate from the hands of the Luxembourg emperor Sigismund. The Electorate — formerly the Duchy of Saxe-Wittenberg — together with the incorporated Margraviate of Meissen and the Thuringian landgraviate formed the united Wettin lands. After the death of Frederick in 1464, his lands were ruled jointly by his two sons, until 1485, when they were partitioned between them.

In the 1485 partition the elder, Ernest, as hereditary Elector of Saxony, necessarily received the Electoral lands around Wittenberg. The rest were partitioned on the "I'll cut, you choose" basis, with Ernest partitioning the lands into two sets, and Albert choosing one set for himself. Albert chose the eastern territory of the former Margraviate of Meissen, while Ernest acquired most of the Thuringian regions in the west. Ernest was said to be disappointed by this outcome, as he had hoped to rule the lands around Meissen, which had been ruled by the House of Wettin since the 12th century, rather than the newly acquired lands of southern Thuringia.

Elector Ernest established the town of Wittenberg as the capital of the Saxon electorate and proclaimed himself Landgrave of Thuringia. Duke Albert III established Dresden as the centre of the Albertine Duchy of Saxony (1485-1547).

In the course of the Protestant Reformation the Ernestine and Albertine branches of the Wettin dynasty found themselves on opposing sides of the 1546/47 Schmalkaldic War. As an ally of victorious Emperor Charles V of Habsburg, the Albertine Duke Maurice of Saxony gained the Wittenberg territory and the electoral dignity, after his defeated Ernestine cousin Elector John Frederick I signed the Capitulation of Wittenberg (1547). From that event, the Albertine line in the former Meissen Margraviate ruled the Electorate and later Kingdom of Saxony. The descendants of John Frederick I only retained the Thuringian territory which furthermore split into numerous Ernestine duchies.

When after World War I the House of Wettin was deposed, the Albertine Saxon Kingdom was succeeded by the Free State of Saxony, while the four former Ernestine duchies formed, along with four minor states, the Free State of Thuringia following a referendum in which Saxe-Coburg (minus Gotha), however, voted to join Bavaria.

== See also ==
- Capitulation of Wittenberg (1547)
- Treaty of Naumburg (1554)

== Sources ==
- Groß, Reiner (2007). Die Wettiner. Stuttgart: Kohlhammer Verlag.
- Wilson, Peter (2016). Heart of Europe: A History of the Holy Roman Empire. Cambridge: Harvard University Press.
