= List of Hessian monarchs =

Monarchy of Hesse
- State
- Royal Coat of arms

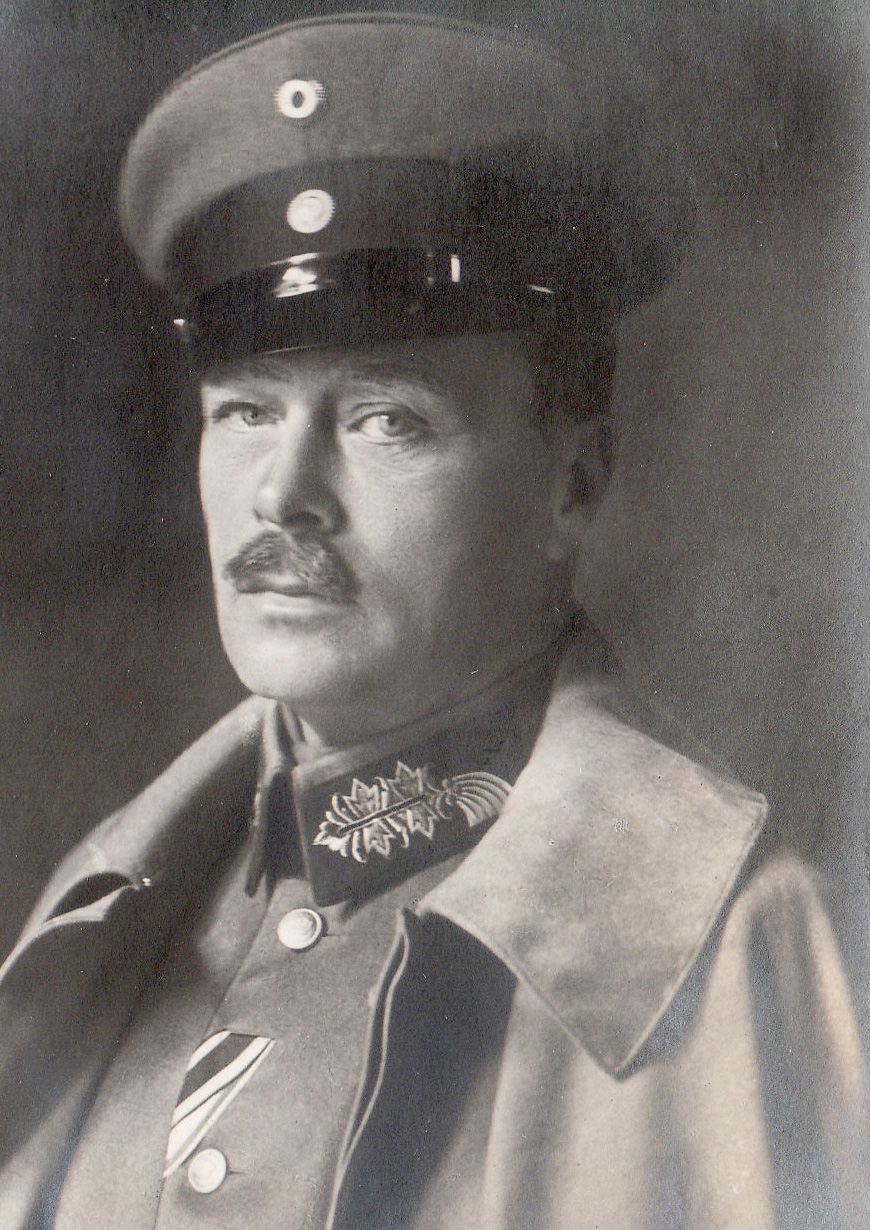
- Ernest Louis

Details
- Style: His Royal Highness
- First monarch: Henry I (as landgrave)
- Last monarch: Ernest Louis (as grand duke)
- Formed: 1264
- Abolished: 9 November 1918
- Appointer: Hereditary
- Pretender: Donatus

Royal Standard of the Grand Duke of Hesse 1903–1918

This is a list of monarchs of Hesse (German: Hessen) during the history of Hesse on west-central Germany. These monarchs belonged to a dynasty collectively known as the House of Hesse and the House of Brabant, originally the Reginar. Hesse was ruled as a landgraviate, electorate and later as a grand duchy until 1918.

The title of all of the following monarchs was "landgrave" (German: Landgraf) unless otherwise noted.

== Landgraviate of Hesse ==
In the early Middle Ages the Hessengau territory (named after the Germanic Chatti tribes) formed the northern parts of the German stem duchy of Franconia along with the adjacent Lahngau. Upon the extinction of the ducal Conradines, these Rhenish Franconian counties were gradually acquired by Landgrave Louis I of Thuringia and his successors.

After the War of the Thuringian Succession upon the death of Landgrave Henry Raspe in 1247, his niece Duchess Sophia of Brabant secured the Hessian possessions for her minor son Henry the Child, who would become the first landgrave of Hesse and founder of the House of Hesse in 1246. The remaining Thuringian landgraviate fell to the Wettin margrave Henry III of Meissen. Henry I of Hesse was raised to princely status by King Adolf of Germany in 1292.

== Rulers of Hesse ==
=== Ludovingian dynasty and House of Hesse ===
==== Partitions of Hesse under Ludowingian and Hesse families ====
Lordship of Hesse-Gudensberg; As part of the Landgraviate of Thuringia, inherited through marriage Gudensberg separated in 1140-1157, 1172-1180 and 1227-1240) (1123-1264)
War of the Thuringian Succession (1247-1264): Hesse was separated from Thuringia
Landgraviate of Hesse; Ludovingian matrilineal line; Briefly divided in Lower Hesse and Upper Hesse in 1308-1311 and 1458-1500 (1264–1567)
Landgraviate of Cassel (1567–1803)	Landgraviate of Rheinfels (1st creation) (1567–1583)	Landgraviate of Marburg (1567–1604)	Landgraviate of Darmstadt (1567–1806)
Landgraviate of Rheinfels (2nd creation) (1627–1658)	Landgraviate of Homburg (1st creation) (1622–1806)
Raised to: Electorate of Hesse (1st creation) (1803–1807)
Landgraviate of Barchfeld (1st creation) (1721–1807)	Landgraviate of Philippsthal (1st creation) (1663–1807)	Landgraviate of Wanfried (1700–1755)
Landgraviate of Rotenburg (1st creation) (1627–1807)
Raised to: Grand Duchy of Hesse (1806–1918)
Annexed to the Kingdom of Westphalia
Landgraviate of Barchfeld (2nd creation) (1813–1866)	Landgraviate of Philippsthal (2nd creation) (1813–1866)	Electorate of Hesse (2nd creation) (1813–1866)	Landgraviate of Rotenburg (2nd creation) (1813–1834)	Landgraviate of Homburg (2nd creation) (1815–1866)
Annexed to the Kingdom of Prussia

==== Table of rulers ====
Ruler	Born	Reign	Ruling part	Consort	Death	Notes
Ludovingian dynasty
Henry Raspe I	c.1090 Second son of Louis the Springer, count in Thuringia and Adelaide of Stade	1123 – 1130	Lordship of Gudensberg (in Hesse)	Kunigunde of Bilstein; 1123 no children	1130 aged 39–40	A second son, didn't inherit the main property of his family. First recorded Ludowingian ruler in the Hessian region, through marriage with the widow of Giso IV, Count of Gudensberg. As he didn't leave descendants, Gudensberg passed to his brother and his respective wife, who was Kunigunde and Giso's daughter.
Louis I	c.1090 First son of Louis the Springer, count in Thuringia and Adelaide of Stade	c.1130 – 12 January 1140	Lordship of Hesse (as part of the Landgraviate of Thuringia)	Hedwig of Gudensberg; 1110 six children	12 January 1140 aged 49–50	First recorded Landgrave of Thuringia. Despite brother of Henry Raspe, he could only inherit the Hessian possessions after marrying Hedwig, daughter of Giso IV and step-daughter of his brother.
Regency of Hedwig of Gudensberg (1140-1142)						Children of Louis I, divided their inheritance. Henry Raspe II died with no children, and Gudensberg returned to the main Thuringian line.
Louis II of Iron	1128; First son of Louis I and Hedwig of Gudensberg	12 January 1140 – 14 October 1172	Lordship of Hesse (as part of the Landgraviate of Thuringia)	Judith of Hohenstaufen; 1150 five children	14 October 1172; Freyburg aged 43–44	Children of Louis I, divided their inheritance. Henry Raspe II died with no children, and Gudensberg returned to the main Thuringian line.
Henry Raspe II	c.1130 Second son of Louis I and Hedwig of Gudensberg	12 January 1140 – 1157	Lordship of Hesse (as part of the Landgraviate of Thuringia, in Gudensberg)	Unmarried	1157 aged 26–27	Children of Louis I, divided their inheritance. Henry Raspe II died with no children, and Gudensberg returned to the main Thuringian line.
Louis III the Mild	1151; First son of Louis II and Judith of Hohenstaufen	14 October 1172 – 16 October 1190	Lordship of Hesse (as part of the Landgraviate of Thuringia)	Margaret of Cleves; 1172 one child Sophia of Minsk; 1184 no children	16 October 1190 near Cyprus aged 43–44	Children of Louis II, divided their inheritance. Henry Raspe III died with no children, and Gudensberg returned to the main Thuringian line. Louis III also didn't leave male inheritors, and all of the family's inheritance was reunited in his younger brother Herman.
Henry Raspe III	c.1155 Second son of Louis II and Judith of Hohenstaufen	14 October 1172 – 18 July 1180	Lordship of Hesse (as part of the Landgraviate of Thuringia, in Gudensberg)	Unmarried	18 July 1180 aged 26–27	Children of Louis II, divided their inheritance. Henry Raspe III died with no children, and Gudensberg returned to the main Thuringian line. Louis III also didn't leave male inheritors, and all of the family's inheritance was reunited in his younger brother Herman.
Herman I the Hard	1155; Third son of Louis II and Judith of Hohenstaufen	16 October 1190 – 25 April 1217	Lordship of Hesse (as part of the Landgraviate of Thuringia)	Sophia of Sommerschenburg (d.1190); 1182 two children Sophia of Wittelsbach; 1196 six children	25 April 1217; Gotha aged 61–62	
Louis IV the Holy	28 October 1200; Creuzburg; First son of Herman I and Sophia of Wittelsbach	25 April 1217 – 11 September 1227	Lordship of Hesse (as part of the Landgraviate of Thuringia)	Elizabeth of Hungary; 1220; Wartburg three children	11 September 1227; Otranto aged 26	His death on his way to Crusade, leaving home with minor children, caused political turmoil in Thuringia regarding his succession.
Regency of Henry Raspe of Thuringia (1227-1241)						After Louis IV's death, his brother Henry Raspe took regency on behalf of his young nephew but never liberated him from his control; some historians have even accused Henry of poisoning the youth. Henry Raspe's brother, Conrad (Grand Master of the Teutonic Order since 1239) aided him in his consolidation of power, and ruled in Hesse and Gudensberg.
Herman II	28 March 1222; Creuzburg; Son of Louis IV and Elizabeth of Hungary	11 September 1227 – 3 January 1241	Lordship of Hesse (as part of the Landgraviate of Thuringia)	Helen of Brunswick-Lüneburg; 1239 no children	3 January 1241; Creuzburg aged 18	After Louis IV's death, his brother Henry Raspe took regency on behalf of his young nephew but never liberated him from his control; some historians have even accused Henry of poisoning the youth. Henry Raspe's brother, Conrad (Grand Master of the Teutonic Order since 1239) aided him in his consolidation of power, and ruled in Hesse and Gudensberg.
Conrad	1206; Third son of Herman I and Sophia of Wittelsbach	11 September 1227 – 24 July 1240	Lordship of Hesse (as part of the Landgraviate of Thuringia, in Gudensberg)	Unmarried	24 July 1240; Rome aged 33–34	After Louis IV's death, his brother Henry Raspe took regency on behalf of his young nephew but never liberated him from his control; some historians have even accused Henry of poisoning the youth. Henry Raspe's brother, Conrad (Grand Master of the Teutonic Order since 1239) aided him in his consolidation of power, and ruled in Hesse and Gudensberg.
Henry Raspe IV	1204; Second son of Herman I and Sophia of Wittelsbach	3 January 1241 – 16 February 1247	Lordship of Hesse (as part of the Landgraviate of Thuringia)	Elisabeth of Brandenburg; 1228 no children Gertrude of Babenberg; 1238 no children Beatrice of Brabant; 1241 no children	16 February 1247; Wartburg aged 42–43	After Herman II's death, and after being his regent, ascended alone to the Thuringian inheritance. He claimed the title of King of the Romans, but his claim rapidly fell out of favor. Left no descendants, which opened the War of the Thuringian Succession.
Sophia	20 March 1224; Daughter of Louis IV and Elizabeth of Hungary	16 February 1247 – 1264	Lordship of Hesse (during the War of the Thuringian Succession)	Henry II, Duke of Brabant; 1241 two children	29 May 1275; Marburg aged 51	Through marriage, she became stepmother of Beatrice, the third wife of her uncle. Sophia fought for her inheritance against her cousin, Henry III, Margrave of Meissen. Eventually kept a part of the old Landgraviate of Thuringia, of which she abdicated in 1264 to her son.
House of Hesse (Matrilineal Ludowingian line)
Henry I the Child	24 June 1244; Marburg; Son of Henry II, Duke of Brabant and Sophia	1264 – 21 December 1308	Landgraviate of Hesse	Adelaide of Brunswick-Lüneburg I 1263 seven children Matilda of Cleves; 1276 seven children	21 December 1308; Marburg aged 64	In 1264, he was recognized as legitimate owner of Hesse, establishing his mother's partial victory in the War of the Thuringian Succession.
Otto I the Elder	1272; Son of Henry I and Adelaide of Brunswick-Lüneburg I	21 December 1308 – 17 January 1328	Landgraviate of Hesse (at Upper Hesse until 1311)	Adelaide of Ravensberg; 1297; Marburg five children	17 January 1328 aged 55–56	Children of Henry I, divided Hesse. After the John's death with no descendants, Otto reunited Hesse.
John	1278; Son of Henry I and Matilda of Cleves	21 December 1308 – 14 February 1311	Landgraviate of Lower Hesse	Adelaide of Brunswick-Lüneburg II; 1306 one child	14 February 1311; Kassel aged 32–33	Children of Henry I, divided Hesse. After the John's death with no descendants, Otto reunited Hesse.
Henry II the Iron	1299; First son of Otto I and Adelaide of Ravensberg	17 January 1328 – 3 June 1376	Landgraviate of Hesse	Elisabeth of Thuringia; 1321 five children	3 June 1376; Kassel aged 76–77	Sons of Otto I, divided their inheritance. In 1336, Henry associated his son Otto to his rule.
Otto II the Younger	1322; Son of Henry II and Elisabeth of Thuringia	1340 – December 1366	Landgraviate of Hesse	Elisabeth of Cleves; 1338 no children	December 1366; Spangenberg aged 43–44	Sons of Otto I, divided their inheritance. In 1336, Henry associated his son Otto to his rule.
Louis (I) the Younger	1305; First son of Otto I and Adelaide of Ravensberg	17 January 1328 – 2 February 1345	Landgraviate of Hesse (at Grebenstein)	Elisabeth of Sponheim-Kreuznach; 15 October 1340 three children	2 February 1345 aged 39–40	Sons of Otto I, divided their inheritance. In 1336, Henry associated his son Otto to his rule.
Herman I the Elder	1305; First son of Otto I and Adelaide of Ravensberg	17 January 1328 – 1370	Landgraviate of Hesse (at Burg Nordeck)	Unmarried	1370 aged 64–65	Sons of Otto I, divided their inheritance. In 1336, Henry associated his son Otto to his rule.
Herman II the Scholar	1341; Grebenstein; Son of Louis (I) the Younger and Elisabeth of Sponheim-Kreuznach	1376 – 24 May 1413	Landgraviate of Hesse (in co-rulership since 1366)	Joanna of Nassau-Weilburg; 3 February 1377 no children Margaret of Nuremberg; 15 October 1383; Kulmbach eight children	24 May 1413; Spangenberg aged 71–72	
Louis I the Peaceful	6 February 1402; Spangenberg; Son of Herman II and Margaret of Nuremberg	24 May 1413 – 17 January 1458	Landgraviate of Hesse	Anna of Saxony; 8 September 1433; Kassel five children	17 January 1458; Spangenberg aged 55	At his death, Hesse was once again divided.
Louis II the Frank	7 September 1438; First son of Louis I and Anna of Saxony	17 January 1458 – 8 November 1471	Landgraviate of Lower Hesse	Matilda of Württemberg-Urach; 1454 four children	8 November 1471; Reichenbach aged 33	Children of Louis I, divided Hesse between them. Henry III associated his son Louis III in a co-rulership.
Henry III the Rich	15 October 1440; Spangenberg; Second son of Louis I and Anna of Saxony	17 January 1458 – 13 January 1483	Landgraviate of Upper Hesse	Anna of Katzenelnbogen; 1458 six children	13 January 1483; Marburg aged 42	Children of Louis I, divided Hesse between them. Henry III associated his son Louis III in a co-rulership.
Louis III the Younger	November 1461; First son of Henry III and Anna of Katzenelnbogen	1474 – 2 July 1478	Landgraviate of Upper Hesse	Unmarried	2 July 1478 aged 16	Children of Louis I, divided Hesse between them. Henry III associated his son Louis III in a co-rulership.
William I the Elder	4 July 1466; Kassel; First son of Louis II and Matilda of Württemberg-Urach	8 November 1471 – 3 June 1493	Landgraviate of Lower Hesse	Anna of Brunswick-Wolfenbüttel; 17 February 1488; Münden five children	8 February 1515; Spangenberg aged 40	Didn't have male heirs. Abdicated in 1493 to his brother, also named William.
Regency of Herman IV, Archbishop of Cologne and Hans Hofman of Dörnberg (1483-1489)						Died without heirs.
William III the Younger	8 September 1471; Second son of Henry III and Anna of Katzenelnbogen	13 January 1483 – 17 February 1500	Landgraviate of Upper Hesse	Elisabeth of the Palatinate; 12 February 1496; Heidelberg no children	17 February 1500 near Rauschenberg aged 28	Died without heirs.
William II the Middle	29 April 1469; Second son of Louis II and Matilda of Württemberg-Urach	3 June 1493 – 11 July 1509	Landgraviate of Hesse (at Lower Hesse until 1500)	Yolande of Vaudémont; 9 November 1497 one child Anna of Mecklenburg-Schwerin; 20 October 1500; Kassel three children	11 July 1509 aged 40	In 1500 reunited Hesse after the death of his cousin William III.
Regency of the Estates of Hesse (1509-1514); Regency of Anna of Mecklenburg-Schwerin (1514-1518)						After his death Hesse was divided between his legitimate sons.
Philip I the Magnanimous	13 November 1504; Marburg; Son of William II and Anna of Mecklenburg-Schwerin	11 July 1509 – 31 March 1567	Landgraviate of Hesse	Christine of Saxony; 11 December 1523; Kassel ten children Margarethe von der Saale; 14 March 1540; Rotenburg an der Fulda (bigamous and morganatic) nine children	31 March 1567; Kassel aged 62	After his death Hesse was divided between his legitimate sons.
William IV the Wise	24 June 1532; Kassel; First son of Philip I and Christine of Saxony	31 March 1567 – 25 August 1592	Landgraviate of Cassel	Sabine of Württemberg; 11 February 1566; Marburg eleven children	25 August 1592; Kassel aged 60	Children of Philip I, divided the land between them: William IV received Kassel; Louis IV received Marburg, which after his childless death was divided between his brothers; Philip II received Rheinfels, which after his childless death was divided between his brothers; George I received Darmstadt.
Louis IV the Elder	27 May 1537; Kassel; Second son of Philip I and Christine of Saxony	31 March 1567 – 9 October 1604	Landgraviate of Marburg	Hedwig of Württemberg; 10 May 1563; Stuttgart no children Maria of Inner Mansfeld; 4 July 1591; Marburg no children	9 October 1604; Marburg aged 67	Children of Philip I, divided the land between them: William IV received Kassel; Louis IV received Marburg, which after his childless death was divided between his brothers; Philip II received Rheinfels, which after his childless death was divided between his brothers; George I received Darmstadt.
Philip II the Younger	22 April 1541; Marburg; Third son of Philip I and Christine of Saxony	31 March 1567 – 20 November 1583	Landgraviate of Rheinfels	Anna Elisabeth of Palatinate-Simmern; 18 January 1569; Heidelberg no children	20 November 1583; Rheinfels aged 42	Children of Philip I, divided the land between them: William IV received Kassel; Louis IV received Marburg, which after his childless death was divided between his brothers; Philip II received Rheinfels, which after his childless death was divided between his brothers; George I received Darmstadt.
George I the Pious	10 September 1547; Kassel; Fourth son of Philip I and Christine of Saxony	31 March 1567 – 7 February 1596	Landgraviate of Darmstadt	Magdalene of Lippe; 17 August 1572; Kassel ten children Eleonora of Württemberg; 25 May 1589 one child	7 February 1596; Darmstadt aged 67	Children of Philip I, divided the land between them: William IV received Kassel; Louis IV received Marburg, which after his childless death was divided between his brothers; Philip II received Rheinfels, which after his childless death was divided between his brothers; George I received Darmstadt.
Marburg and Rheinfels redivided between Cassel and Darmstadt
Maurice the Learned	25 May 1572; Kassel; Son of William IV and Sabine of Württemberg	25 August 1592 – 17 March 1627	Landgraviate of Cassel	Agnes of Solms-Laubach; 23 September 1593; Kassel four children Juliane of Nassau-Siegen; 22 May 1603; Dillenburg fourteen children	15 March 1632; Eschwege aged 59	Abdicated to his children.
Louis V the Faithful	24 September 1577; Darmstadt; First son of George I and Magdalene of Lippe	7 February 1596 – 27 July 1626	Landgraviate of Darmstadt	Magdalene of Brandenburg; 5 June 1598; Berlin eleven children	27 July 1626; Rheinfels aged 48	Children of George I, redivided the land: Louis V kept Darmstadt; Philip III received Butzbach, which after his death was reannexed to Darmstadt; Frederick I received Homburg.
Philip III	26 December 1581; Darmstadt; Second son of George I and Magdalene of Lippe	7 February 1596 – 28 April 1643	Landgraviate of Darmstadt (at Butzbach)	Anna Margaretha von Diepholz; 29 July 1610; Darmstadt no children Christina Sophia of East Frisia; 2 June 1632; Aurich no children	28 April 1643; Bad Ems aged 61	Children of George I, redivided the land: Louis V kept Darmstadt; Philip III received Butzbach, which after his death was reannexed to Darmstadt; Frederick I received Homburg.
Frederick I	5 March 1585; Fischbachtal; Third son of George I and Magdalene of Lippe	7 February 1596 – 9 May 1638	Landgraviate of Homburg	Margaret Elisabeth of Leiningen-Westerburg; 10 August 1622; Butzbach six children	9 May 1638; Bad Homburg aged	Children of George I, redivided the land: Louis V kept Darmstadt; Philip III received Butzbach, which after his death was reannexed to Darmstadt; Frederick I received Homburg.
Butzbach reannexed to Darmstadt
George II	17 March 1605; Darmstadt; First son of Louis V and Magdalene of Brandenburg	27 July 1626 – 11 June 1661	Landgraviate of Darmstadt	Sophia Eleonore of Saxony; 1 April 1627; Torgau fifteen children	11 June 1661; Darmstadt aged 56	Children of Louis V, redivided the land: George II kept Darmstadt; John received Braubach, which after his childless death returned to Darmstadt.
John the Stately	17 June 1609; Darmstadt; Second son of Louis V and Magdalene of Brandenburg	27 July 1626 – 1 April 1651	Landgraviate of Darmstadt (at Braubach)	Johannetta of Sayn-Wittgenstein; 30 September 1647; Friedewald no children	1 April 1651; Bad Ems aged 41	Children of Louis V, redivided the land: George II kept Darmstadt; John received Braubach, which after his childless death returned to Darmstadt.
Braubach reannexed to Darmstadt
William V the Stable	13 February 1602; Kassel; Son of Maurice and Agnes of Solms-Laubach	17 March 1627 – 21 September 1637	Landgraviate of Cassel	Amalie Elisabeth of Hanau-Münzenberg; 21 September 1619 twelve children	21 September 1637; Leer aged 35	Children of Maurice, redivided the land: William V kept Kassel; Herman IV received Rotenburg, which after his childless death merged in Rheinfels; Frederick received Eschwege, which after his childless death returned to Kassel; Ernest received Rheinfels, which after Herman IV's death merged with Rotenburg, retaining the name Rotenburg.
Herman IV the Feeder	15 August 1607; Kassel; First son of Maurice and Juliane of Nassau-Siegen	17 March 1627 – 25 March 1658	Landgraviate of Rotenburg	Sophie Juliane of Waldeck; 31 December 1633; Waldeck two children Kunigunde Juliane of Anhalt-Dessau; 2 February 1642; Weimar no children	25 March 1658; Rotenburg an der Fulda aged 50	Children of Maurice, redivided the land: William V kept Kassel; Herman IV received Rotenburg, which after his childless death merged in Rheinfels; Frederick received Eschwege, which after his childless death returned to Kassel; Ernest received Rheinfels, which after Herman IV's death merged with Rotenburg, retaining the name Rotenburg.
Frederick the Flyer	9 May 1617; Kassel; Second son of Maurice and Juliane of Nassau-Siegen	17 March 1627 – 24 September 1655	Landgraviate of Cassel (at Eschwege)	Eleonora Catherine of the Palatinate-Zweibrücken; 8 September 1646; Stockholm six children	24 September 1655 near Poznań aged 38	Children of Maurice, redivided the land: William V kept Kassel; Herman IV received Rotenburg, which after his childless death merged in Rheinfels; Frederick received Eschwege, which after his childless death returned to Kassel; Ernest received Rheinfels, which after Herman IV's death merged with Rotenburg, retaining the name Rotenburg.
Ernest	8 December 1623; Kassel; Third son of Maurice and Juliane of Nassau-Siegen	17 March 1627 – 25 March 1658	Landgraviate of Rheinfels	Maria Eleonore of Solms-Lich; June 1647; Frankfurt two children	2 May 1693; Cologne aged 69	Children of Maurice, redivided the land: William V kept Kassel; Herman IV received Rotenburg, which after his childless death merged in Rheinfels; Frederick received Eschwege, which after his childless death returned to Kassel; Ernest received Rheinfels, which after Herman IV's death merged with Rotenburg, retaining the name Rotenburg.
Ernest	8 December 1623; Kassel; Third son of Maurice and Juliane of Nassau-Siegen	25 March 1658 – 2 May 1693	Landgraviate of Rotenburg	Maria Eleonore of Solms-Lich; June 1647; Frankfurt two children	2 May 1693; Cologne aged 69	Children of Maurice, redivided the land: William V kept Kassel; Herman IV received Rotenburg, which after his childless death merged in Rheinfels; Frederick received Eschwege, which after his childless death returned to Kassel; Ernest received Rheinfels, which after Herman IV's death merged with Rotenburg, retaining the name Rotenburg.
Eschwege reannexed to Kassel; Rheinfels merged in Rotenburg
Regency of Amalie Elisabeth of Hanau-Münzenberg (1637-1650)						
William VI the Just	23 May 1629; Kassel; Son of William V and Amalie Elisabeth of Hanau-Münzenberg	21 September 1637 – 16 July 1663	Landgraviate of Cassel	Hedwig Sophie of Brandenburg; 19 July 1649; Cölln seven children	16 July 1663; Haina aged 34	
Regency of Margaret Elisabeth of Leiningen-Westerburg (1638-1648)						Sold the majority of the landgraviate to his brother, George Christian, retaining Bingenheim for himself.
William Christoph the Decorated	13 November 1625; Rosbach vor der Höhe; First son of Frederick I and Margaret Elisabeth of Leiningen-Westerburg	9 May 1638 – 1669	Landgraviate of Homburg (1669-1681 in Bingenheim only)	Sophia Eleonore of Hesse-Darmstadt; 21 April 1650; Darmstadt twelve children Anna Elisabeth of Saxe-Lauenburg; 2 April 1665; Lübeck (annulled 1672) no children	27 August 1681; Echzell aged 55	Sold the majority of the landgraviate to his brother, George Christian, retaining Bingenheim for himself.
Louis VI the Intrepid	25 January 1630; Darmstadt; First son of George II and Sophia Eleonore of Saxony	11 June 1661 – 24 April 1678	Landgraviate of Darmstadt	Maria Elisabeth of Holstein-Gottorp; 24 November 1650; Gottorp eight children Elisabeth Dorothea of Saxe-Gotha-Altenburg; 5 December 1666; Gotha eight children	24 April 1678; Darmstadt aged 48	Children of George II, redivided the land: Louis VI kept Darmstadt; George III received Itter, which after his childless death was reannexed to Darmstadt.
George III	29 September 1632; Darmstadt; Second son of George II and Sophia Eleonore of Saxony	11 June 1661 – 19 July 1676	Landgraviate of Darmstadt (at Itter)	Dorothea Auguste of Schleswig-Holstein-Sonderburg-Franzhagen; 5 May 1661 one child Juliane Alexandrine of Leinigen-Heidenheim; 21 July 1667 three children	19 July 1676; Vöhl aged 43	Children of George II, redivided the land: Louis VI kept Darmstadt; George III received Itter, which after his childless death was reannexed to Darmstadt.
Regency of Hedwig Sophie of Brandenburg (1663-1670)						Children of William VI. With their mother as regent, they redivided the land: William VII kept Cassel, which after his sudden death was inherited by his brother, Charles I; Philip received Philippsthal.
William VII	21 June 1651; Kassel; First son of William VI and Hedwig Sophie of Brandenburg	16 July 1663 – 21 November 1670	Landgraviate of Cassel	Unmarried	21 November 1670; Paris aged 19	Children of William VI. With their mother as regent, they redivided the land: William VII kept Cassel, which after his sudden death was inherited by his brother, Charles I; Philip received Philippsthal.
Philip	14 December 1655; Kassel; Third son of William VI and Hedwig Sophie of Brandenburg	16 July 1663 – 18 June 1721	Landgraviate of Philippsthal	Catharina Amalia of Solms-Laubach; 14 April 1680 eight children	18 June 1721; Aachen aged 65	Children of William VI. With their mother as regent, they redivided the land: William VII kept Cassel, which after his sudden death was inherited by his brother, Charles I; Philip received Philippsthal.
George Christian the Brave	13 November 1625; Bad Homburg; Second son of Frederick I and Margaret Elisabeth of Leiningen-Westerburg	1669 – 1671	Landgraviate of Homburg	Anna Catharina Pogwitsch; 11 October 1666; Hamburg no children	1 August 1677; Frankfurt aged 50	Inherited his brother's land. Hesse-Homburg became under mortgage to two merchants (1671–1673) and to the Landgraves of Hesse-Darmstadt (1673–1679). Hesse-Homburg returned then to George Christian's brother, Frederick.
Homburg temporarily mortgaged to Darmstadt (1671-1680)
Regency of Hedwig Sophie of Brandenburg (1670-1677)						
Charles I	3 August 1654; Kassel; Second son of William VI and Hedwig Sophie of Brandenburg	21 November 1670 – 23 March 1730	Landgraviate of Cassel	Maria Amalia of Courland; 21 May 1673; Kassel fourteen children	23 March 1730; Kassel aged 75	
Louis VII the Gracious	22 June 1658; Darmstadt; Son of Louis VI and Maria Elisabeth of Holstein-Gottorp	24 April – 31 August 1678	Landgraviate of Darmstadt	Unmarried	31 August 1678; Gotha aged 20	
Regency of Elisabeth Dorothea of Saxe-Gotha-Altenburg (1678-1688)						
Ernest Louis	15 December 1667; Gotha; Son of Louis VI and Elisabeth Dorothea of Saxe-Gotha-Altenburg	31 August 1678 – 12 September 1739	Landgraviate of Darmstadt	Dorothea Charlotte of Brandenburg-Ansbach; 1 December 1687; Darmstadt five children	12 September 1739; Einhausen aged 71	
Frederick II the Restrained	30 March 1633; Bad Homburg; Third son of Frederick I and Margaret Elisabeth of Leiningen-Westerburg	1680 – 24 January 1708	Landgraviate of Homburg	Margareta Brahe; 12 May 1661; Stockholm no children Louise Elisabeth of Courland; 23 October 1670; Cölln twelve children Sophie Sybille of Leiningen-Westerburg; 1691 three children	24 January 1708; Bad Homburg aged 74	Removed Homburg from the mortgage of his brother.
William the Elder	15 May 1648; Kassel; First son of Ernest and Maria Eleonore of Solms-Lich	2 May 1693 – 20 November 1725	Landgraviate of Rotenburg	Maria Anna of Löwenstein-Wertheim; 3 March 1669; Rochefort eight children	20 November 1725; Bad Schwalbach aged 77	Children of Ernest, redivided the land: William kept Rotenburg; Charles received Wanfried.
Charles	19 July 1649; Rheinfels; Second son of Ernest and Maria Eleonore of Solms-Lich	2 May 1693 – 3 March 1711	Landgraviate of Wanfried	Sophie Magdalene of Salm-Reifferscheid before 1675 five children Alexandrine Juliane of Leiningen-Dagsburg before 1703 eleven children	3 March 1711; Bad Schwalbach aged 61	Children of Ernest, redivided the land: William kept Rotenburg; Charles received Wanfried.
Frederick III Jacob	19 May 1673; Cölln; Son of Frederick II and Louise Elisabeth of Courland	23 January 1708 – 8 June 1746	Landgraviate of Homburg	Elisabeth Dorothea of Hesse-Darmstadt; 14 February 1700; Butzbach nine children Christiane Charlotte of Nassau-Ottweiler; 17 October 1728; Saarbrücken no children	8 June 1746 's-Hertogenbosch aged 73	
William II the Younger	25 August 1671; Langenschwalbach; First son of Charles and Sophie Magdalene of Salm-Reifferscheid	3 March 1711 – 1 April 1731	Landgraviate of Wanfried	Ernestine of Palatinate-Sulzbach; 19 September 1719 no children	1 April 1731; Paris aged 59	Left no heirs. His lands were inherited by his brother, Christian.
Charles I	23 September 1682; Schmalkalden; First son of Philip and Catharina Amalia of Solms-Laubach	18 June 1721 – 8 May 1770	Landgraviate of Philippsthal	Caroline Christine of Saxe-Eisenach; 24 November 1725; Eisenach five children	8 May 1770; Philippsthal aged 87	Children of Philip, redivided the land: Charles I kept Philippsthal; William received Barchfeld.
William	1 April 1692; Philippsthal; Second son of Philip and Catharina Amalia of Solms-Laubach	18 June 1721 – 13 May 1761	Landgraviate of Barchfeld	Charlotte Wilhelmine of Anhalt-Hoym; 31 October 1724; Hoym fifteen children	13 May 1761; Breda aged 69	Children of Philip, redivided the land: Charles I kept Philippsthal; William received Barchfeld.
Ernest Leopold	15 June 1684; Langenschwalbach; Son of William and Maria Anna of Löwenstein-Wertheim	20 November 1725 – 29 November 1749	Landgraviate of Rotenburg	Eleonore of Löwenstein-Wertheim; 9 November 1704; Frankfurt ten children	29 November 1749; Rotenburg an der Fulda aged 65	
Regency of William of Hesse-Kassel (1730-1751)						Also King of Sweden. Left no heirs. Given his absence, Hesse-Cassel was ruled by his brother, William, later Landgrave William VIII.
Frederick I	28 April 1676; Kassel; First son of Charles I and Maria Amalia of Courland	23 March 1730 – 5 April 1751	Landgraviate of Cassel	Louise Dorothea of Prussia; 31 May 1700; Berlin no children Ulrika Eleonora, Queen of Sweden; 24 March 1715; Stockholm no children	5 April 1751; Stockholm aged 74	Also King of Sweden. Left no heirs. Given his absence, Hesse-Cassel was ruled by his brother, William, later Landgrave William VIII.
Christian	17 July 1689; Wanfried; Second son of Charles and Alexandrine Juliane of Leiningen-Dagsburg	1 April 1731 – 21 October 1755	Landgraviate of Wanfried	Maria Franziska of Hohenlohe-Bartenstein c.1730 no children	21 October 1755; Eschwege aged 66	Left no heirs. His lands reverted to Rotenburg.
Wanfried reannexed to Rotenburg
Louis VIII	5 April 1691; Darmstadt; Son of Ernest Louis and Dorothea Charlotte of Brandenburg-Ansbach	12 September 1739 – 17 October 1768	Landgraviate of Darmstadt	Charlotte of Hanau-Lichtenberg; 5 April 1717; Hanau six children	17 October 1768; Darmstadt aged 77	
Frederick IV Charles	15 April 1724; Braunfels; Son of Casimir William of Hesse-Homburg and Christine Charlotte of Solms-Braunfels	8 June 1746 – 7 February 1751	Landgraviate of Homburg	Ulrike Louise of Solms-Braunfels; 10 October 1746; Hungen two children	7 February 1751; Bad Homburg aged 26	Nephew of Frederick III.
Constantine	24 May 1716; Rotenburg an der Fulda; Son of Ernest Leopold and Eleonore of Löwenstein-Wertheim	29 November 1749 – 30 December 1778	Landgraviate of Rotenburg	Sophia von Starhemberg; 1745 eleven children Jeanne Henriette de Bombelles; 27 May 1775 no children	30 December 1778; Wildeck aged 62	
Regency of Ulrike Louise of Solms-Braunfels (1751-1766)						In 1806, the Landgraviate was mediatised to the Grand Duchy of Hesse, but was reestablished by the Congress of Vienna of 1815.
Frederick V	30 January 1748; Bad Homburg; Son of Frederick IV Charles and Ulrike Louise of Solms-Braunfels	7 February 1751 – 12 July 1806 11 June 1815 – 20 January 1820	Landgraviate of Homburg	Caroline of Hesse-Darmstadt; 27 September 1768; Darmstadt eleven children	20 January 1820; Bad Homburg aged 71	In 1806, the Landgraviate was mediatised to the Grand Duchy of Hesse, but was reestablished by the Congress of Vienna of 1815.
Homburg mediatised to the Grand Duchy of Hesse (1806-1815), then reestablished
William VIII	10 March 1682; Kassel; Second son of Charles I and Maria Amalia of Courland	5 April 1751 – 1 February 1760	Landgraviate of Cassel	Dorothea Wilhelmine of Saxe-Zeitz; 27 September 1717; Zeitz three children	1 February 1760; Rinteln aged 77	Already regent from 1730.
Frederick II	14 August 1720; Kassel; Son of William VIII and Dorothea Wilhelmine of Saxe-Zeitz	1 February 1760 – 31 October 1785	Landgraviate of Cassel	Mary of Great Britain; 8 May 1740; London (by proxy); 28 June 1740; Kassel (in person) four children Philippine of Brandenburg-Schwedt; 10 January 1773; Berlin no children	31 October 1785; Kassel aged 65	
Frederick	13 February 1727; Grave; First son of William and Charlotte Wilhelmine of Anhalt-Hoym	13 May 1761 – 13 November 1777	Landgraviate of Barchfeld	Sophia Henrietta of Salm-Grunbach; 1772 no children	13 November 1777; Barchfeld aged 50	Left no heirs. His brother Adolf inherited the land.
Louis IX	15 December 1719; Darmstadt; Son of Louis VIII and Charlotte of Hanau-Lichtenberg	1768 – 6 April 1790	Landgraviate of Darmstadt	Caroline of Palatinate-Zweibrücken; 12 August 1741; Zweibrücken eight children	6 April 1790; Pirmasens aged 59	Children of Louis VIII, divided their inheritance: Louis IX received his father's inheritance; Caroline Louise received her mother's inheritance in Hanau-Lichtenberg, which then passed to Baden.
Caroline Louise	11 July 1723; Darmstadt; Daughter of Louis VIII and Charlotte of Hanau-Lichtenberg	1768 – 8 April 1783	Landgraviate of Darmstadt (at Hanau-Lichtenberg)	Charles Frederick, Grand Duke of Baden; 28 January 1751 five children	8 April 1783; Paris aged 59	Children of Louis VIII, divided their inheritance: Louis IX received his father's inheritance; Caroline Louise received her mother's inheritance in Hanau-Lichtenberg, which then passed to Baden.
William	29 August 1726; Philippsthal; Son of Charles I and Caroline Christine of Saxe-Eisenach	8 May 1770 – 9 July 1807	Landgraviate of Philippsthal	Ulrika Eleonora of Hesse-Barchfeld; 22 June 1755; Tournai nine children	8 August 1810; Philippsthal aged 83	Between 1807 and 1813 the Landgraviate was annexed to the Kingdom of Westphalia.
Adolph	29 June 1743; Ypres; Second son of William and Charlotte Wilhelmine of Anhalt-Hoym	13 November 1777 – 17 July 1803	Landgraviate of Barchfeld	Louise of Saxe-Meiningen; 18 October 1781; Meiningen six children	17 July 1803; Barchfeld aged 60	
Charles Emmanuel	5 June 1746; Langenschwalbach; Son of Constantine and Sophia von Starhemberg	30 December 1778 – 9 July 1807	Landgraviate of Rotenburg	Leopoldina of Liechtenstein; 1 September 1771; Felsberg two children	23 March 1812; Frankfurt aged 65	Between 1807 and 1813 the Landgraviate was annexed to the Kingdom of Westphalia.
Rotenburg briefly annexed to the Kingdom of Westphalia (1807-1813)
William I	3 June 1743; Kassel; Son of Frederick II and Mary of Great Britain	31 October 1785 – 9 July 1807 21 November 1813 – 27 February 1821	Landgraviate of Cassel (until 1803) Electorate of Hesse (from 1803)	Wilhelmina Caroline of Denmark; 1 September 1764; Copenhagen four children	27 February 1821; Kassel aged 77	Created Prince-elector of Hesse as His Royal and Serene Highness in 1803. Between 1807 and 1813 the Grand Duchy was annexed to the Kingdom of Westphalia.
The Electorate briefly annexed to the Kingdom of Westphalia (1807-1813)
Louis I	14 June 1753; Prenzlau; Son of Louis IX and Caroline of Palatinate-Zweibrücken	6 April 1790 – 6 April 1830	Landgraviate of Darmstadt (until 1806) Grand Duchy of Hesse (from 1806)	Louise of Hesse-Darmstadt; 19 February 1777; Darmstadt seven children	6 April 1830; Darmstadt	Created Grand Duke of Hesse in 1806.
Charles	27 June 1784; Barchfeld; Son of Adolph and Louise of Saxe-Meiningen	1803 – 9 July 1807 21 November 1813 – 17 July 1854	Landgraviate of Barchfeld	Auguste of Hohenlohe-Ingelfingen; 19 July 1816; Öhringen two children Sophie of Bentheim and Steinfurt; 10 September 1823; Steinfurt four children	17 July 1854; Philippsthal aged 70	Between 1806 and 1813 the Landgraviate was annexed to the Kingdom of Westphalia.
Barchfeld briefly annexed to the Kingdom of Westphalia (1807-1813)
Louis	8 October 1766; Philippsthal; First son of William and Ulrika Eleonora of Hesse-Barchfeld	21 November 1813 – 15 February 1816	Landgraviate of Philippsthal	Marie Franziska Berghe of Trips; 21 January 1791; Susteren two children	15 February 1816; Naples aged 49	Landgraviate recovered in 1813 by the hand of the Elector of Hesse. Left no children, and the Landgraviate was inherited by his brother.
Victor Amadeus	2 September 1779; Rotenburg an der Fulda; Son of Charles Emmanuel and Leopoldina of Liechtenstein	21 November 1813 – 12 November 1834	Landgraviate of Rotenburg	Leopoldine of Fürstenberg; 20 October 1799; Prague no children Elisabeth of Hohenlohe-Langenburg; 10 September 1812; Langenburg one child Eleonora of Salm-Reifferscheidt-Krautheim and Gerlachsheim; 19 November 1831; Gerlachsheim no children	12 November 1834; Racibórz aged 55	In 1834, Hesse-Rotenburg reunited with the Electorate of Hesse.
Rotenburg annexed to the Electorate of Hesse
Ernest Constantine	8 August 1771; Philippsthal; Second son of William and Ulrika Eleonora of Hesse-Barchfeld	15 February 1816 – 25 December 1849	Landgraviate of Philippsthal	Louise of Schwarzburg-Rudolstadt; 10 April 1796; Rudolstadt five children Caroline of Hesse-Philippsthal; 17 February 1812; Kassel two children	25 December 1849; Meiningen aged 78	Landgraviate recovered in 1813 by the hand of the Elector of Hesse.
Frederick VI	30 July 1769; Bad Homburg; First son of Frederick V and Caroline of Hesse-Darmstadt	20 January 1820 – 2 April 1829	Landgraviate of Homburg	Elizabeth of the United Kingdom; 7 April 1818; London no children	2 April 1829; Bad Homburg aged 59	Left no heirs. The landgraviate was inherited by his brother.
William II	28 July 1777; Hanau; Son of William I and Wilhelmina Caroline of Denmark	27 February 1821 – 20 November 1847	Electorate of Hesse	Augusta of Prussia; 13 February 1797; Berlin six children Emilie Ortlöpp; 8 July 1841 (morganatic) eight children Caroline of Berlepsch; 8 July 1841; Hanau (morganatic) no children	20 November 1847; Frankfurt aged 70	
Louis William	29 August 1770; Bad Homburg; Second son of Frederick V and Caroline of Hesse-Darmstadt	2 April 1829 – 19 January 1839	Landgraviate of Homburg	Augusta Amalia of Nassau-Usingen; 1804 (annulled 1805) no children	19 January 1839; Luxembourg aged 68	Left no heirs. The land was inherited by his brother.
Louis II	26 December 1777; Darmstadt; Son of Louis I and Louise of Hesse-Darmstadt	6 April 1830 – 16 June 1848	Grand Duchy of Hesse	Wilhelmine of Baden; 19 June 1804; Karlsruhe seven children	16 June 1848; Darmstadt aged 70	
Philip	11 March 1779; Bad Homburg; Third son of Frederick V and Caroline of Hesse-Darmstadt	19 January 1839 – 15 December 1846	Landgraviate of Homburg	Rosalie Antonie Pototschnig; 1838 (morganatic) no children	15 December 1846; Bad Homburg aged 67	Left no heirs. The land was inherited by his brother.
Gustav	17 February 1781; Bad Homburg; Fourth son of Frederick V and Caroline of Hesse-Darmstadt	15 December 1846 – 8 September 1848	Landgraviate of Homburg	Louise of Anhalt-Dessau; 12 February 1818; Dessau three children	8 September 1848; Bad Homburg aged 67	Left no male heirs. The landgraviate was inherited by his brother.
Frederick William	20 August 1802; Hanau; Son of William II and Augusta of Prussia	20 November 1847 – 22 July 1866	Electorate of Hesse	Gertrude von Hanau; 26 June 1831 (morganatic) nine children	6 January 1875; Prague aged 72	In 1866 the Electorate was annexed by the Kingdom of Prussia.
Electorate of Hesse annexed to the Kingdom of Prussia
Louis III	9 June 1806; Darmstadt; Son of Louis II and Wilhelmine of Baden	16 June 1848 – 13 June 1877	Grand Duchy of Hesse	Mathilde Caroline of Bavaria; 26 December 1833; Munich no children Magdalene of Hochstadten; 1868 (morganatic) no children	13 June 1877; Seeheim aged 71	
Ferdinand	26 April 1783; Bad Homburg; Fifth son of Frederick V and Caroline of Hesse-Darmstadt	8 September 1848 – 24 March 1866	Landgraviate of Homburg	Unmarried	24 March 1866; Bad Homburg aged 82	Left no male heirs. At his death the Landgraviate of Hesse-Homburg was briefly added to the territory of Louis III (Hesse-Darmstadt) before being annexed by the Kingdom of Prussia later in 1866.
Homburg annexed to the Kingdom of Prussia
Charles II	22 May 1803; Philippsthal; Son of Ernest Constantine and Louise of Schwarzburg-Rudolstadt	25 December 1849 – 22 July 1866	Landgraviate of Philippsthal	Marie of Württemberg; 9 October 1845; Pokój two children	12 February 1868; Philippsthal aged 64	In 1866 the Landgraviate was annexed by the Kingdom of Prussia.
Philippsthal annexed to the Kingdom of Prussia
Alexis	13 September 1829; Burgsteinfurt; Son of Charles and Sophie of Bentheim and Steinfurt	17 July 1854 – 22 July 1866	Landgraviate of Barchfeld	Louise of Prussia; 17 June 1854; Berlin (divorced 1861) no children	16 August 1905; Herleshausen aged 75	In 1866 the Landgraviate was annexed by the Kingdom of Prussia.
Barchfeld annexed to the Kingdom of Prussia
Louis IV	12 September 1837; Darmstadt; Son of Prince Charles of Hesse and by Rhine and Elisabeth of Prussia	13 June 1877 – 13 March 1892	Grand Duchy of Hesse	Alice of the United Kingdom; 1 July 1862; East Cowes seven children Alexandrine von Hutten-Czapska; 30 April 1884; Darmstadt (morganatic, annulled 1884) no children	13 March 1892; Darmstadt aged 54	Nephew of Louis III.
Ernest Louis	25 November 1868; Darmstadt; Son of Louis IV and Alice of the United Kingdom	13 March 1892 – 9 November 1918	Grand Duchy of Hesse	Victoria Melita of Saxe-Coburg and Gotha; 19 April 1894; Coburg (annulled 21 December 1901) two children Eleonore of Solms-Hohensolms-Lich; 2 February 1905; Darmstadt two children	9 October 1937; Langen aged 68	Deposed in 1918, at the end of World War I.

== See also ==
- House of Hesse
- History of Hesse
- Coat of arms of Hesse
