= Judith of Thuringia =

Queen of Bohemia from 1158 to 1172

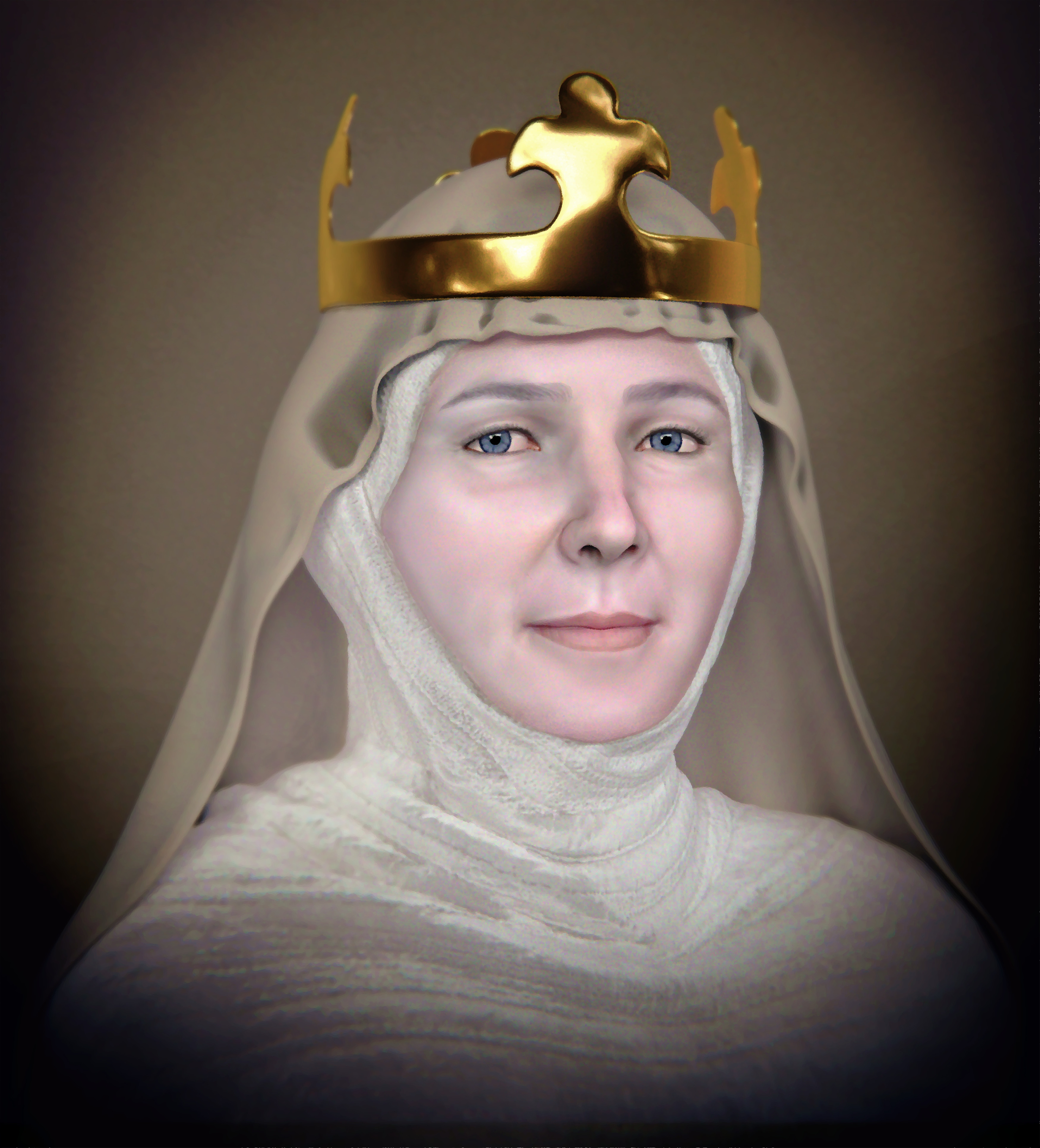
- Forensic facial reconstruction of Judith of Thuringia

Queen consort of Bohemia
- Tenure: 1158–1172

Duchess consort of Bohemia
- Tenure: 1153–1158
- Born: c. 1135; Wartburg Castle
- Died: c. 1210, aged 75; see below
- Burial: Teplice Abbey
- Spouse: Vladislaus II, Duke of Bohemia
- Issue Detail: Ottokar I, King of Bohemia; Vladislaus III, Duke of Bohemia
- House: Ludovingians
- Father: Louis I, Landgrave of Thuringia
- Mother: Hedwig of Gudensberg

Judith of Thuringia (Czech: Judita Durynská; c. 1135 – c. 1210), a member of the Ludovingian dynasty, was Queen consort of Bohemia from 1158 until 1172 as the second wife of King Vladislaus II. She was the second Queen of Bohemia after Świętosława of Poland, wife of King Vratislaus II, had received the title in 1085.

== Marriage ==
Judith was the daughter of Landgrave Louis I of Thuringia (d. 1140) and his wife Hedwig of Gudensberg. Her sister was Bertha of Lorraine. She was raised at the Thuringian court at Wartburg Castle. In 1153 she was married to Duke Vladislaus II of Bohemia, three years after the death of his first wife Gertrude of Babenberg. The main reason for the marriage was that Judith, by her brother Landgrave Louis II and his wife Judith of Hohenstaufen, was related to the new German King Frederick Barbarossa. Vladislaus' bride was about eighteen years old; he was 15–20 years her senior.

Probably in 1155, two years after the wedding, Judith gave birth to the first son. In medieval times the names for babies were chosen mostly by mothers, so it was probably Judith's idea to name the son Přemysl after the legendary founder of the Přemyslid dynasty.

== Queen Judith ==
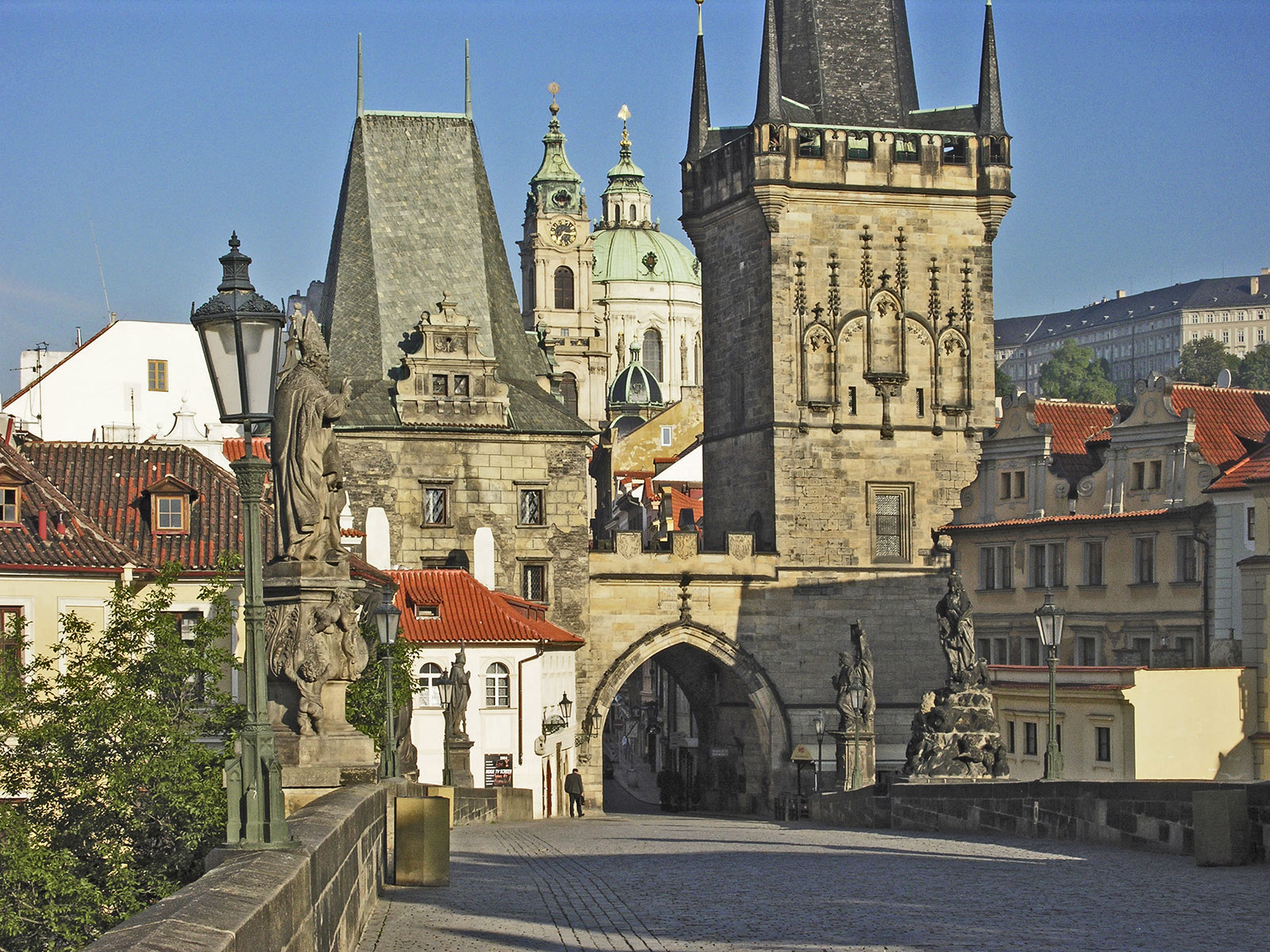
Judith Tower (left), Charles Bridge

The chronicler Vincent, canon of Prague, wrote that Judith was of great beauty and mind, educated in Latin and politics. It is said that she often deputized for Vladislaus in his absence. When he obtained the royal title from Emperor Frederick and was crowned King of Bohemia in 1158, Judith became Queen consort. Her coronation is not actually documented, but chronicles write about Queen Judith.

During Vladislaus' rule a new bridge across the Vltava river in Prague was built from about 1160, where the famous Charles Bridge stands today. It was one of the first stone bridges in central Europe; Judith financed it, and in honour of her it was called Judith Bridge (Juditin most). Drawn away by a 1342 flood, remnants of some pillars and arches are still visible, as well as the preserved bridge tower (Juditina věž) on the Malá Strana bank.

In the ongoing struggle around the Prague throne, Judith backed the inheritance claims of her son Přemysl Ottokar, however, Duke Vladislaus named his stepbrother Frederick his successor. When her husband finally abdicated in 1172, his wife followed him to exile in Thuringia. Vladislaus died two years later at Meerane Castle.

=== Death ===
It is not known where Judith died, but her remains were found in the former Benedictine monastery of Teplice, which she had founded about 1164. According to the historian Emanuel Vlček, she died about 1210 at the age of 75, living to see the successful reign of her eldest son Přemysl.

== Children ==
- Ottokar (c. 1155 – 1230), Duke of Bohemia in 1192/93 and again from 1197, became King of Bohemia in 1198, first of a hereditary line
- Vladislaus III (c. 1160 – 1222), Duke of Bohemia in 1197, Margrave of Moravia from 1197 until his death
- Richeza (d. 1182), married to Henry of Mödling, a younger son of Duke Henry II of Austria.

== Literature ==
- KAREŠOVÁ, Z.; PRAŽÁK, J. Královny a kněžny české. 1. vyd. Praha : X-Egem, 1996.
- VLČEK, E. Judita Durynská– paní znamenité krásy a ducha neobyčejného. O čem vypovídá lebka manželky krále Vladislava II. Vesmír 81, říjen 2002.
- M. Skopal. K otázce řezenské korunovace Vladislava II. "Acta Universitatis Carolinae. Philosophica et Historica", T. 2: Studia Historica, t. 31: 1987, s. 31–39, ad rem: s. 36–37.
- A. Merhautová-Livorová. Reliéf na věži bývalého Juditina mostu. "Uméní", R. 19: 1971, nr 1, s. 70–75.

Judith of Thuringia Ludovingians Born: c. 1135 Died: 9 September after 1174
Royal titles
Preceded by Gertrude of Babenberg	Duchess consort of Bohemia; 1153–1158	Succeeded by Elisabeth of Hungary
Preceded by Świętosława of Poland	Queen consort of Bohemia; 1158–1172	Succeeded by Adelheid of Meissen
