= Thuringian Counts' War =

Conflict in Thuringia

The Thuringian Counts' War (German: Thüringer Grafenkrieg), or Thuringian Counts' Feud (Thüringer Grafenfehde) was a conflict between several ancient aristocratic families and the House of Wettin for supremacy in Thuringia. The war lasted from 1342 to 1346. The conflict is also called by various other names in English sources including War of the Thuringian Counts and Thuringian Comital War.

In 1247, the last Thuringian landgrave from the House of the Ludovingians, Henry Raspe, died without a male heir. During the war of succession that followed, Henry the Illustrious, Margrave of Meissen, finally won the landgraviate for the House of Wettin, whilst the Hessian territories went to Henry I of Hesse and formed the new Landgraviate of Hesse. The grandson of Henry the Illustrious, Frederick I, the Brave, and his son, Frederick II, the Serious, tried to secure the suzerainty of the Wettins over Thuringia and thus fell inevitably into opposition with the other princes in the land.

On 1 September 1342, the various counts and lords of Thuringia of sealed a pact in Arnstadt which effectively allied them against Frederick the Serious. The parties to the alliance included the counts of Schwarzburg, Weimar-Orlamünde and Hohnstein and the advocates of Gera and Plauen. Conflict broke out in October. The Electoral Mainz archbishop, Henry III of Virneburg, who was already in dispute with the citizens of Erfurt over city rights, supported the counts and so the citizens of Erfurt took the side of Frederick the Serious.

By 14 December 1342 the first peace treaty, brokered by the Emperor, was signed. Because the counts and advocates were bound to pay a very high sum - 338,000 Marks of Erfurt silver - for "breaking the peace", however, the peace did not hold and fighting soon flared up again. Frederick now sought to weaken the opposing allies by agreeing separate treaties with his enemies: first on 6 September 1343 with the advocates of Gera and Plauen, on 28 July 1345 with the Schwarzburgs, and finally on 11 April 1346 in the Treaty of Dresden with the Count of Weimar-Orlamünde. Each of the allies had to turn their main territories into fiefs of the Wettins and so lost their imperial immediacy and their political independence.

The outcome of the comital war strengthened the position of the Wettins in Thuringia, although were unable to finally drive the Schwarzburgs and the advocates out of Thuringia and these vassals continued to play an important role until the end of the monarchy in Thuringia in 1918 (cf. Schwarzburg-Rudolstadt, Schwarzburg-Sondershausen, Reuß). However, after the counts' war they could not further expand their territories, but were restricted to their homelands and therefore no longer in a position to threaten the dominance of the Wettins in Thuringia. For the counts of Weimar-Orlamünde the result of the war meant the end of their imperial immediacy. A short while later, Weimar fell to Wettin as an agreed fief and became an important residenz of the Ernestine branch of the Wettins (cf. Saxe-Weimar and Saxe-Weimar-Eisenach).

== Literature ==
- Wilhelm Füßlein (1929), "Die Thüringer Grafenfehde 1342–1346", Beiträge zur thüringischen und sächsischen Geschichte. Festschrift für Otto Dobenecker zum 70. Geburtstag am 2. April 1929 (in German), Jena: Fischer, pp. 111–139
