= Treaty of Weißenfels =

1249 treaty in Thuringia

The Treaty of Weißenfels (German: Weißenfelser Vertrag) was a treaty signed on 1 July 1249 at Weißenfels Castle in the wake of the War of the Thuringian Succession.

Following the death of the last Ludovingian Landgrave of Thuringia, Henry Raspe, war broke out in 1247 over the Landgraviate of Thuringia. Weißenfels Castle, on the eastern edge of the old Ludovingian heartland and now a Thuringian inheritance, thus formed an important point of contention in the war of succession. With this treaty the majority of the Thuringian counts recognised the Wettin Duke Henry III of Meissen, the Illustrious, as the new Landgrave of Thuringia.

== Literature ==
- Andreas Tacke: Kontinuität und Zäsur: Ernst von Wettin und Albrecht von Brandenburg. Band 1 von Schriftenreihe der Stiftung Moritzburg, Kunstmuseum des Landes Sachsen-Anhalt, Stiftung Moritzburg, Wallstein Verlag, 2005, ISBN 3892449554.
- Jörg Rogge, Uwe Schirmer: Hochadelige Herrschaft im mitteldeutschen Raum (1200 bis 1600). Formen - Legitimation - Repräsentation, Reihe: Quellen und Forschungen zur sächsischen Geschichte 23, Franz Steiner Verlag, 2002, ISBN 3-515-08245-X, pp. 243–303.
