= Judith of Hohenstaufen =

Landgravine of Thuringia (c. 1133/4–1191)

- Landgravine of Thuringia
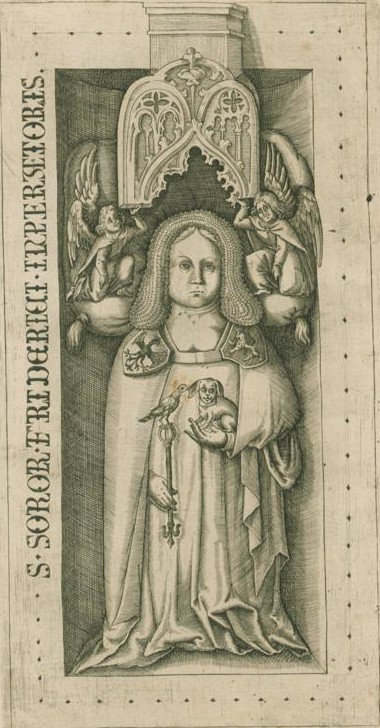
- Grave stone of Judith of Hohenstaufen
- Born: c. 1133/1134
- Died: 7 July 1191
- Buried: Reinhardsbrunn
- Noble family: House of Hohenstaufen
- Spouse: Louis II, Landgrave of Thuringia
- Issue: Louis III "the Mild"; Henry Raspe III; Frederick; Herman I; Judith; Sophia
- Father: Frederick II, Duke of Swabia
- Mother: Agnes of Saarbrücken

Judith of Hohenstaufen, also known as Judith of Hohenstaufen or Judith of Swabia (c. 1133/1134 – 7 July 1191), a member of the Hohenstaufen dynasty, was Landgravine of Thuringia from 1150 until 1172 by her marriage with the Ludovingian landgrave Louis II. She was baptized as Judith, but was commonly called Jutta or Guta. Sometimes the Latinate form Clementia was used, or Claritia or Claricia.

== Life ==
Judith was a daughter of Duke Frederick II of Swabia (1090–1147) and his second wife Agnes of Saarbrücken, thereby a younger half-sister of Emperor Frederick Barbarossa (1122–1190). She first appeared in contemporary sources in 1150, upon her marriage with Landgrave Louis II of Thuringia. This wedlock was intended to cement the relationship between the Thuringian Ludovingians and the imperial House of Hohenstaufen, to strengthen Emperor Barbarossa in his fierce conflict with Duke Henry the Lion and the House of Welf.

When in 1168 her husband reconciled with Henry the Lion, Judith began the construction of Runneburg Castle in Weißensee. The neighbouring Counts of Beichlingen objected, and protested to Emperor Barbarossa. However, the emperor sided with his half-sister and rejected the protests. Runneburg Castle was situated halfway between Wartburg Castle and Neuenburg Castle and became the residence of the Landgraves of Thuringia. Later during the conflicts between Germany's most powerful dynasties, the strategically located Runneburg Castle became one of the most important castles in the area.

Judith survived both her husband and her eldest son Landgrave Louis III. She died on 7 July 1191 and was buried in Reinhardsbrunn monastery next to her husband.

Her name is still omnipresent in Weißensee, which shows how highly she was regarded during her lifetime.

== Grave stone ==
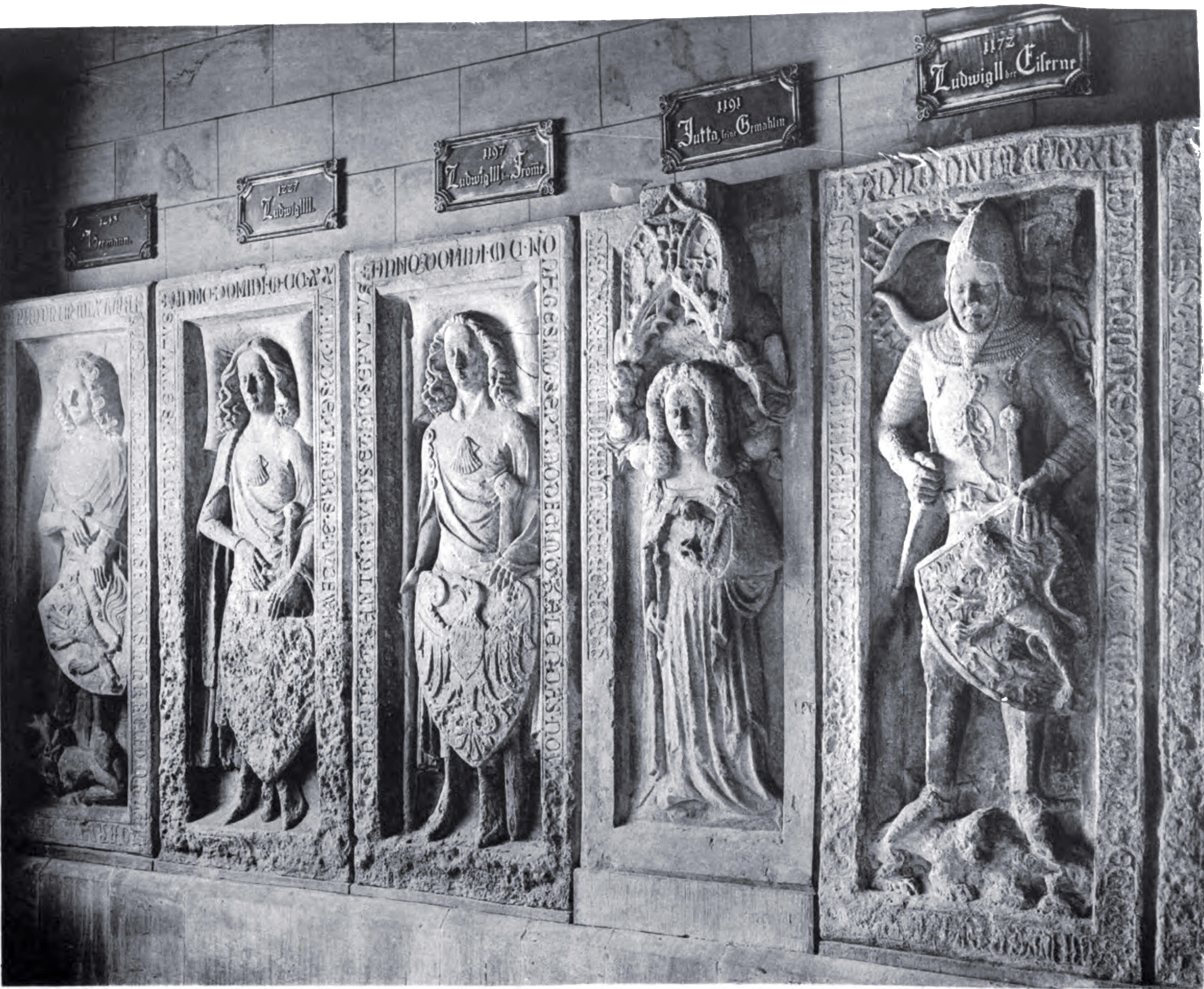
Grave stones of the Thuringian landgraves in Reinhardsbrunn, 1891

Judith's grave stone was created in the 14th century, well after her death. It must have been installed after the fire of 1292. It was moved from Reinhardsbrunn to the choir of the St. George's Church in Eisenach.

The Landgravine is depicted holding a lap dog in her left arm, while her right hand holds a scepter. A wide cantilevered canopy, held up by two angels, is extended over her head. The angels appear to sit on a pillow behind her head. The inscription reads S. SOROR FRIDERICI INPERATORIS ("the sister of Emperor Frederick").

Due to the canopy, this grave stone was larger than those of the other Landgraves of Thuringia (which are also on display in the St. George church in Eisenach). It must have made her grave very visible, even when the grave stone was part of the church floor. The presence of the Emperor's sister in the family tree introduced additional honor, which is why her family background was emphasized in the inscription.

== Marriage and issue ==
In 1150, Judith married Louis II, Landgrave of Thuringia. They had the following children:

- Louis III (1151–1190), succeeded her husband as Landgrave of Thuringia
- Herman I (d. 1217), succeeded his brother as Landgrave of Thuringia
- Henry Raspe III (c. 1155 – 18 July 1217), Count of Gudensberg
- Frederick (c. 1155 – 1229), Count of Ziegenhain
- Judith, married Herman II, Count of Ravensberg
