= Coat of arms of Hesse =

- Armiger: Hesse, Germany
- Shield: Azure a lion rampant barry of ten argent and gules, armed or

The coat of arms of Hesse was introduced in 1949. It is based on the historical coat of arms of the Ludovingian landgraves of Hesse and Thuringia. The lion on the modern arms does not wear a crown or hold a sword, as it does on the arms of the Grand Duchy.

== History ==
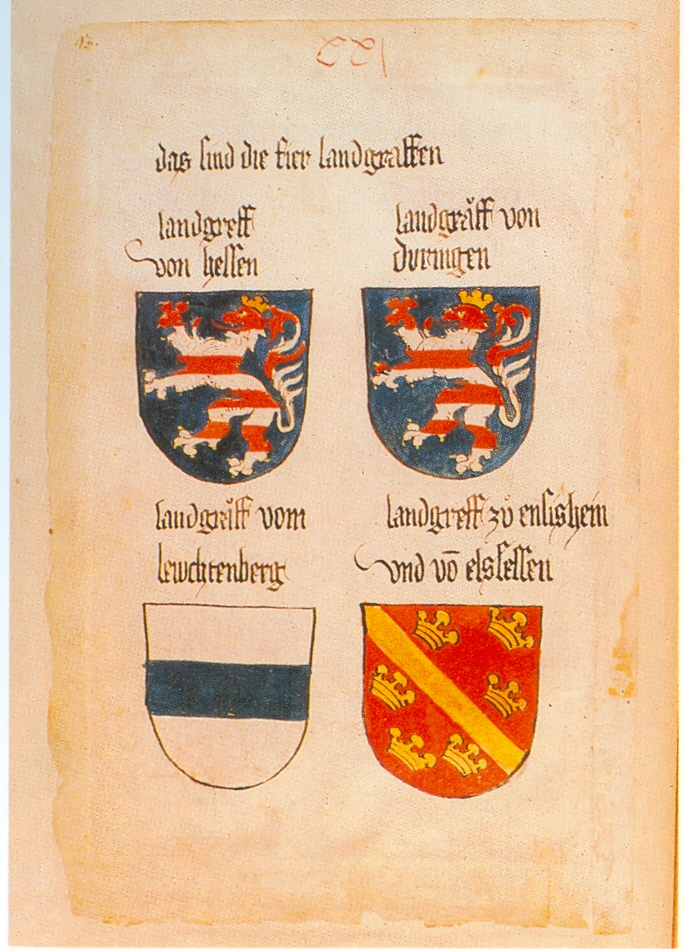
The Ludovingian lion barry in the Ingeram Codex of 1459, given as the coat of arms of the landgraves of Hesse and Thuringia

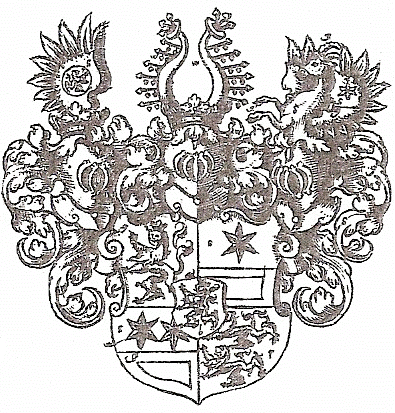
Coat of arms of the landgrave of Hesse in Siebmacher’s Wappenbuch (1703)

Lesser coat of arms of the Grand Duchy of Hesse, using the coat of arms of the duchy itself, with the crown of a Grand Duchy and two lions as supporters (1806 to 1918)

Greater coat of arms of the Grand Duchy of Hesse in 1902

Greater coat of arms of the Electorate of Hesse (1815–1866)

Coat of arms of Landgraviat of Hesse-Homburg (1736–1866)

The coat of arms of the Prussian province of Hesse-Nassau

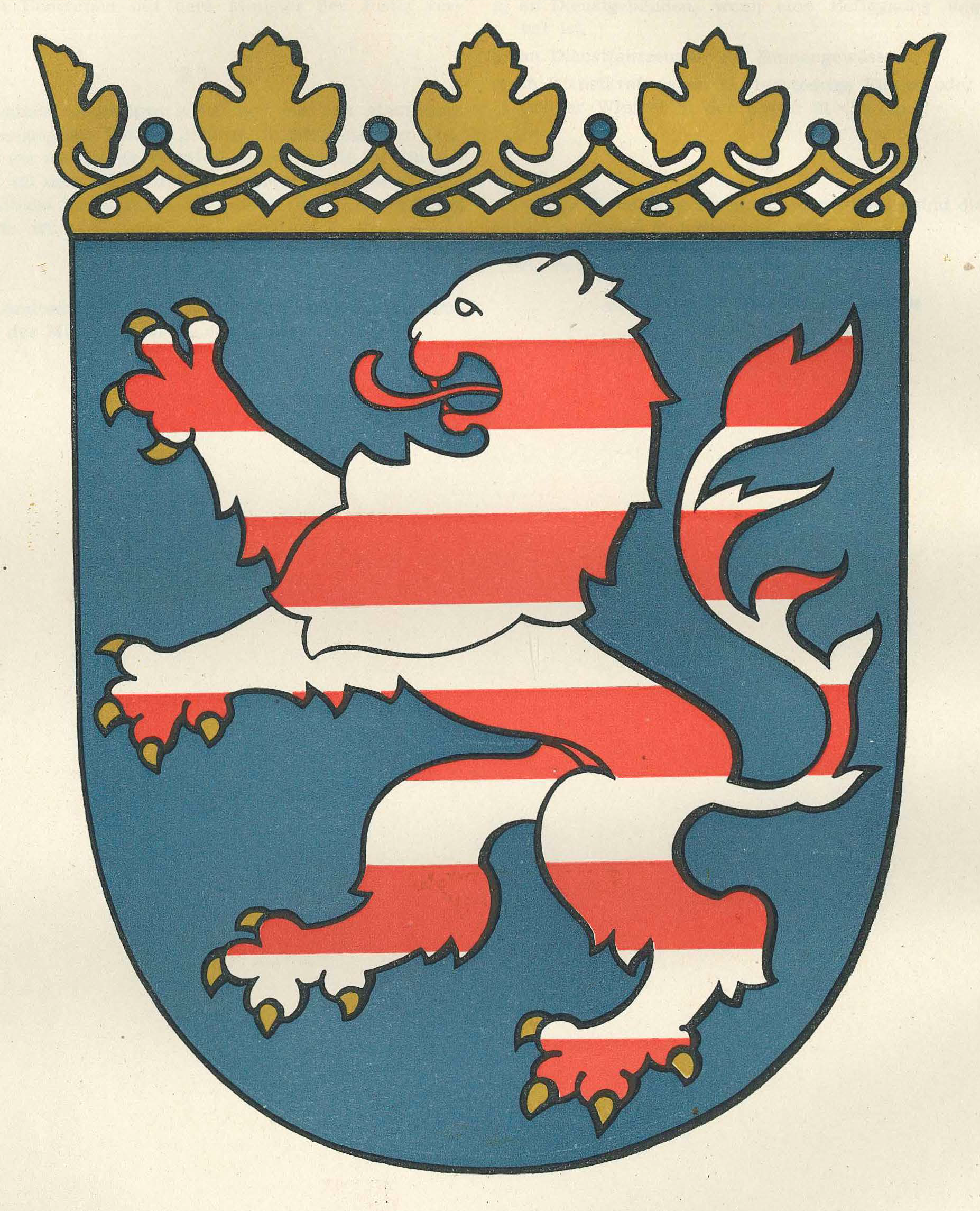
Design by Gerhard Matzat (1949)

== See also ==
- Coat of arms of Prussia
- Coat of arms of Germany
- Coat of arms of Thuringia, which has a similar appearance.
- Origin of the coats of arms of German federal states.
