= Star League =

Star League may refer to:

- Star League (BattleTech), part of the BattleTech fictional setting
- Qatar Stars League, the top-level football league in Qatar
- Star League (Hesse), an alliance of nobles opposed to the Landgraviate of Hesse
