= Duchy of Thuringia =

Eastern Frontier, Merovingian Austrasia

Duchy (Landgraviate) of Thuringia Herzogtum (Landgrafschaft) Thüringen
- before 631–1482
- The Ludovingian lion barry (presumed banner of arms) Coat of arms of Landgrave Albert II, 1265
- Status: Frankish duchy, then State of the Holy Roman Empire
- Capital: Erfurt
- Religion: Roman Catholicism
- Government: Feudal Duchy
- Historical era: Middle Ages
  - Frankish invasion: c. 531
  - Duchy established: before 631
  - Re-established as Landgraviate: 1111/12
  - Comital line extinct: 1247
  - Split off Hesse: 1264
  - To Saxony: 1482
Preceded by	Succeeded by
Thuringi	Landgraviate of Hesse; Electorate of Saxony

The Duchy of Thuringia, later known as the Landgraviate of Thuringia, was a polity in medieval Thuringia, initially a duchy, and then a landgraviate. It was centered in the homeland of Thuringians, encompassing territories previously ruled by independent Kings of Thuringia. During the first half of the 6th century, Thuringia came under the supreme rule of Frankish kings, and was organized as an eastern frontier region of the Merovingian kingdom of Austrasia. It was established as a duchy about 631, by King Dagobert I, who appointed a local Thuringian noble Radulf as the first Duke of Thuringia. It was recreated within the Carolingian Empire, and then belonged to the East Frankish Realm.

Within the Holy Roman Empire, the territory was initially divided into several counties, held by various noble families, among whom the Ludovingians emerged as the most powerful. Since 1131, they ruled as Landgraves of Thuringia and Princes of the Holy Roman Empire. Besides the landgravian domains, several minor counties also continued to exist throughout Thuringia, thus reflecting the feudal fragmentation of the land. Further divisions and occasional conflicts within dynasties who held the landgravian domains also contributed to that process, particularly since Ludovingians died out in 1247, and the Thuringian Landgraviate passed to Wettins, who already held the neighboring March of Meissen, and later acquired the Electorate of Saxony (1423). When William III, Landgrave of Thuringia died in 1482, his domains and titles passed to his nephews, Prince-Elector Ernest of Saxony and Duke Albert III of Saxony, who concluded the Treaty of Leipzig (1485) and divided all Wettinian domains, including those in Thuringia, with both sides continuing to use the Thuringian landgravian title, that was kept in dyastic traditions of both Ernestine and Albertine branches, as one of their secondary titles.

== History ==
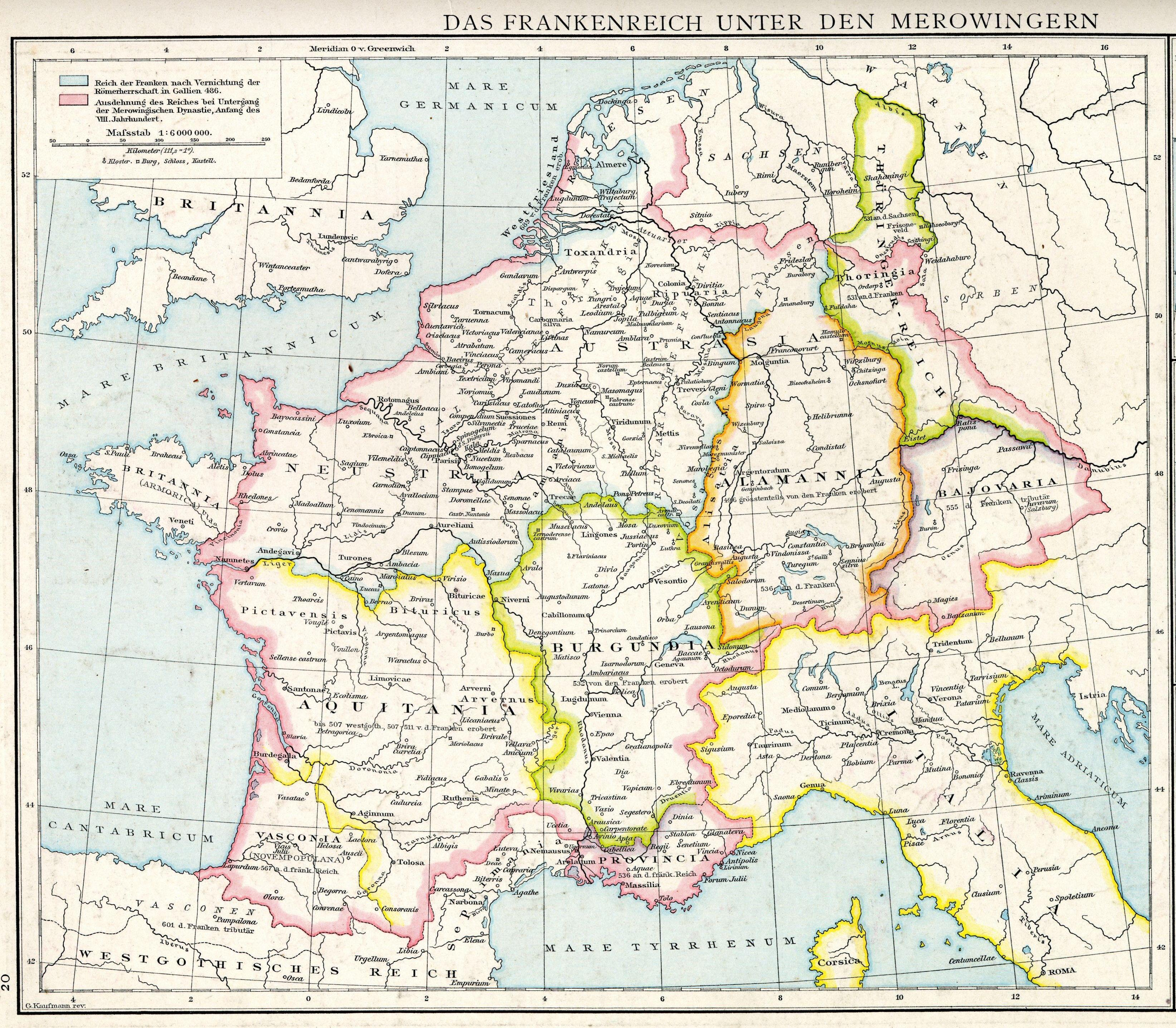
Francia about 486, with Thuringian realm in the east

The former kingdom of the Thuringi arose during the Migration Period after the decline of the Hunnic Empire in Central Europe in the mid 5th century, culminating in their defeat in the 454 Battle of Nedao. With Bisinus a first Thuringian king is documented about 500, who ruled over extended estates that stretched beyond the Main River in the south. His son and successor Hermanafrid married Amalaberga, a niece of the Ostrogothic king Theoderic the Great, thereby hedging the threat of incursions by the Merovingian Franks in the west. However, when King Theoderic died in 526, they took the occasion to invade the Thuringian lands and finally carried off the victory in a 531 battle on the Unstrut River. King Theuderic of Rheims had Hermanafrid trapped in Zülpich (Tolbiacum) where the last Thuringian king was killed. His niece Princess Radegund was kidnapped by King Chlothar I and died in exile in 586.

The Thuringian realm was shattered: the territory north of the Harz mountain range was settled by Saxon tribes, while the Franks moved into the southern parts on the Main River. The estates east of the Saale River were beyond Frankish control and taken over by Polabian Slavs.

=== Duchy of Thuringia ===
Frankish Empire with Thuringian march

The first documented duke (dux) of remaining Thuringia was a local noble named Radulf, installed by King Dagobert in the early 630s, while Franks were in conflict with the Slavic tribal alliance of Samo, that was also joined by Thuringian neighbor Dervan, duke of the Sorbs. Radulf was able to secure the Frankish border along the Saale River in the east from Slavic incursions. However, according to the Chronicle of Fredegar, in 641/2 his victories "turned his head" (i.e., made him proud) and he rebelled against Dagobert's successor, King Sigebert III. A punitive expedition led by the king and the Frankish Mayor of the Palace Grimoald ultimately failed and Radulf was able to maintain his semi-autonomous position, even going so far as declaring himself king (rex) of Thuringia and concluding treaties with Slavs and other peoples.

His successors of the local ducal dynasty, the Hedenen, supported missionary activity within the duchy, but seem to have lost their hold on Thuringia after the rise of the Pippinids in the early eighth century. A conflict with Charles Martel around 717–19 brought an end to autonomy.

Thuringia (blue) and neighboring regions in the 11th century

In 839, upon the Worms partition of Carolingian realms, the Duchy of Thuringia with its marches was assigned by emperor Louis the Pious (d. 840) to his oldest son Lothair I, who later had to cede, under the Treaty of Verdun (843), all East Frankish territories, including Thuringia, to his younger brother Louis the German.

By 849, the eastern part of Thuringia was organised as the limes Sorabicus, or Sorbian March, and placed under a duke named Thachulf. In the Annals of Fulda his title is dux Sorabici limitis, "duke of the Sorbian frontier", but he and his successors were commonly known as duces Thuringorum, "dukes of the Thuringians", as they set about establishing their power over the old duchy. After Thachulf's death in 873, the Sorbs rose in revolt and he was succeeded by his son Radulf. In 880, King Louis replaced Radulf with Poppo, perhaps a kinsman. Poppo instigated a war with Saxony in 882 and in 883 he and his brother Egino fought a civil war for control of Thuringia, in which the latter was victorious. Egino died in 886 and Poppo resumed command.

In 892, King Arnulf replaced Poppo with Conrad. This was an act of patronage by the king, for Conrad's house, the Conradines, were soon feuding with Poppo's, the Babenbergs. But Conrad's rule was short, perhaps because he had a lack of local support. He was replaced by Burchard, whose title in 903 was marchio Thuringionum, "margrave of the Thuringians". Burchard had to defend Thuringia from the incursions of the Magyars and was defeated and killed in battle, along with the former duke Egino, on 3 August 908. He was the last recorded duke of Thuringia. The duchy was the smallest of the so-called "younger stem duchies", and was absorbed by Saxony after Burchard's death, when Burchard's sons were finally expelled by Duke Henry the Fowler in 913.

The Thuringians remained a distinct people, and in the 12th century, Thuringia was understood to be the landscape south of the Harz Mountains, along the river Saale, north of the Thuringian Forest, along the Werra between the Rhön Mountains and the mouth of the river Fulda, as well as the region of Eichsfeld. The Thuringian Basin formed the core of Thuringia. The once Thuringian areas east of the river Helme and north of the river Unstrut were considered Saxon territory, as were the once Thuringian marches of Merseburg, Zeitz and Meissen, which were almost exclusively inhabited by Slavs. The Saxon counties belonged to the Archbishopric of Magdeburg under canon law, while Thuringia belonged to the Archbishopric of Mainz. From the 12th century the territory was organised as the Landgraviate of Thuringia.

=== Landgraviate of Thuringia ===
The Landgraviate of Thuringia within the Empire around the middle of the 13th century

A separate Thuringian stem duchy did not exist during the emergence of the German kingdom from East Francia in the 10th century. Large parts of the Thuringian estates were controlled by the Counts of Weimar and the Margraves of Meissen. According to the medieval chronicler Thietmar of Merseburg, Margrave Eckard I (d. 1002) was appointed Thuringian duke. After his assassination 1002, Count William II of Weimar acted as Thuringian spokesman with King Henry II of Germany. In 1111/12 Count Herman I of Winzenburg is documented as a Thuringian landgrave, the first mention of a secession from Saxony, however, he later had to yield as he sided with the Papacy during the Investiture Controversy.

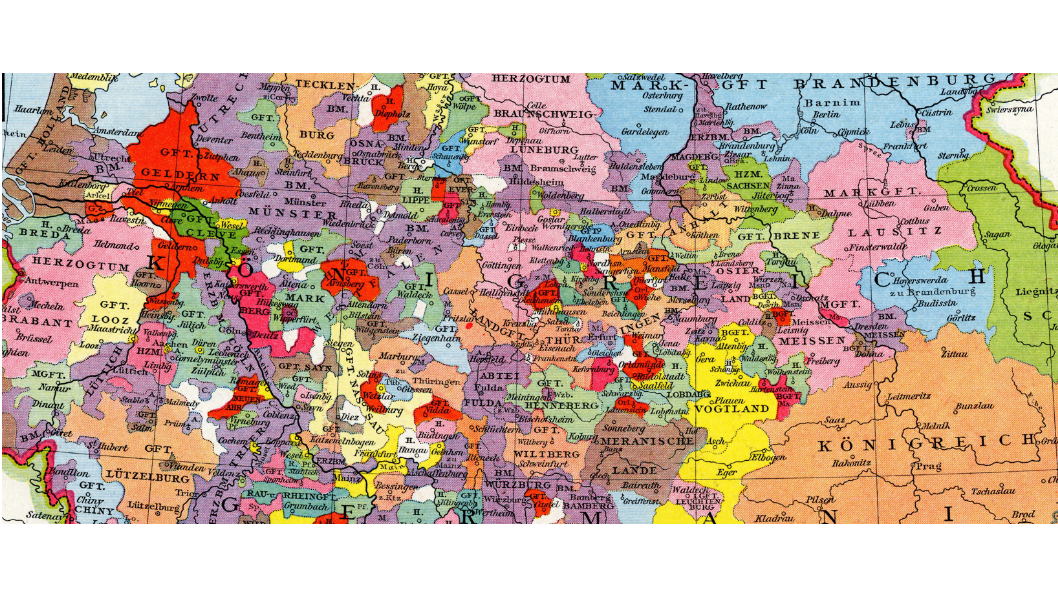
Feudal fragmentation of Thuringia and neighboring regions in the 13th century

Meanwhile, the Franconian aristocrat Louis the Springer (1042–1123) laid the foundations for the erection of Wartburg Castle, which became the residence of his descendants who, beginning with his son Louis I, served as Thuringian landgraves. Louis I had married the Rhenish Franconian countess Hedwig of Gudensberg and became the heir of extended estates in Thuringia and Hesse. A close ally of King Lothair II of Germany against the rising Hohenstaufen dynasty, he was appointed Landgrave of Thuringia in 1131. The dynasty maintained the landgraviate throughout the fierce struggle of the Hohenstaufen and Welf royal families, occasionally switching sides according to the circumstances.

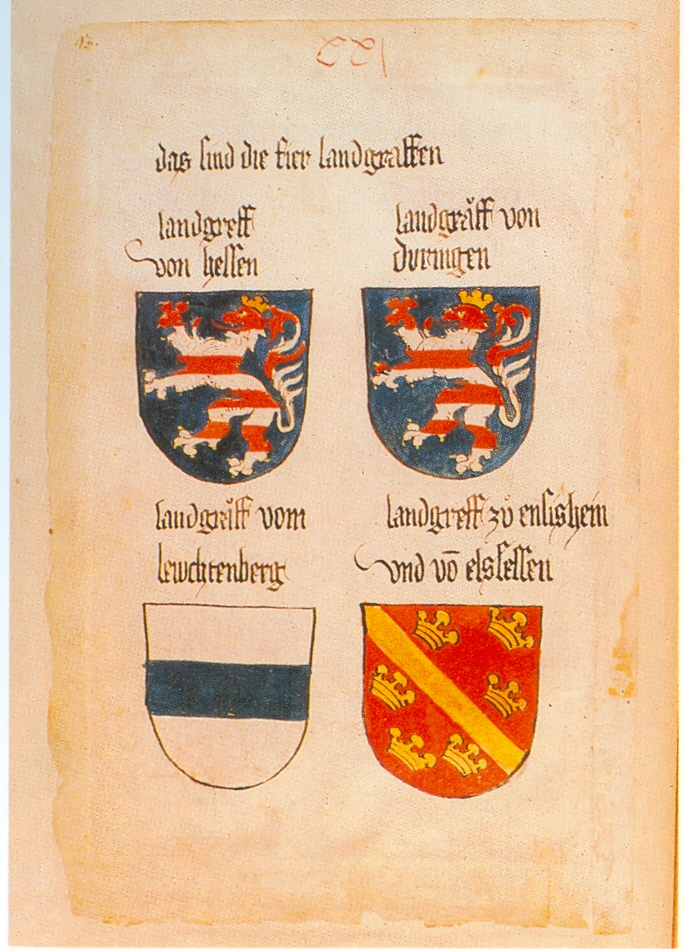
Coat of arms of the Landgraviates of Hesse and Thuringia, Codex Ingeram, c. 1459

Beside the Wartburg, the Ludovingian landgraves had further lavish residences erected, like Neuenburg Castle ("New Castle") near Freyburg, and Marburg Castle in their Hessian estates. In the "Golden Age" under Hohenstaufen rule, Thuringia became a centre of Middle High German culture, epitomized by the legendary Sängerkrieg at the Wartburg, or the ministry of Saint Elizabeth, the daughter of King Andrew II of Hungary. When Landgrave Louis IV married her in 1221, the Ludovingian dynasty had accomplished the advancement to one of the mightiest princely houses of the Holy Roman Empire. Under the rule of the landgraves town privileges were conferred to Mühlhausen and Nordhausen which became Free imperial cities, while the largest city Erfurt remained a possession of the Prince-Archbishops of Mainz. The landgraves maintained close ties with the Teutonic Knights, the order established several commandries east of the Saale, as in Altenburg and Schleiz, with the administrative seat of the Thuringian bailiwick in Zwätzen near Jena.

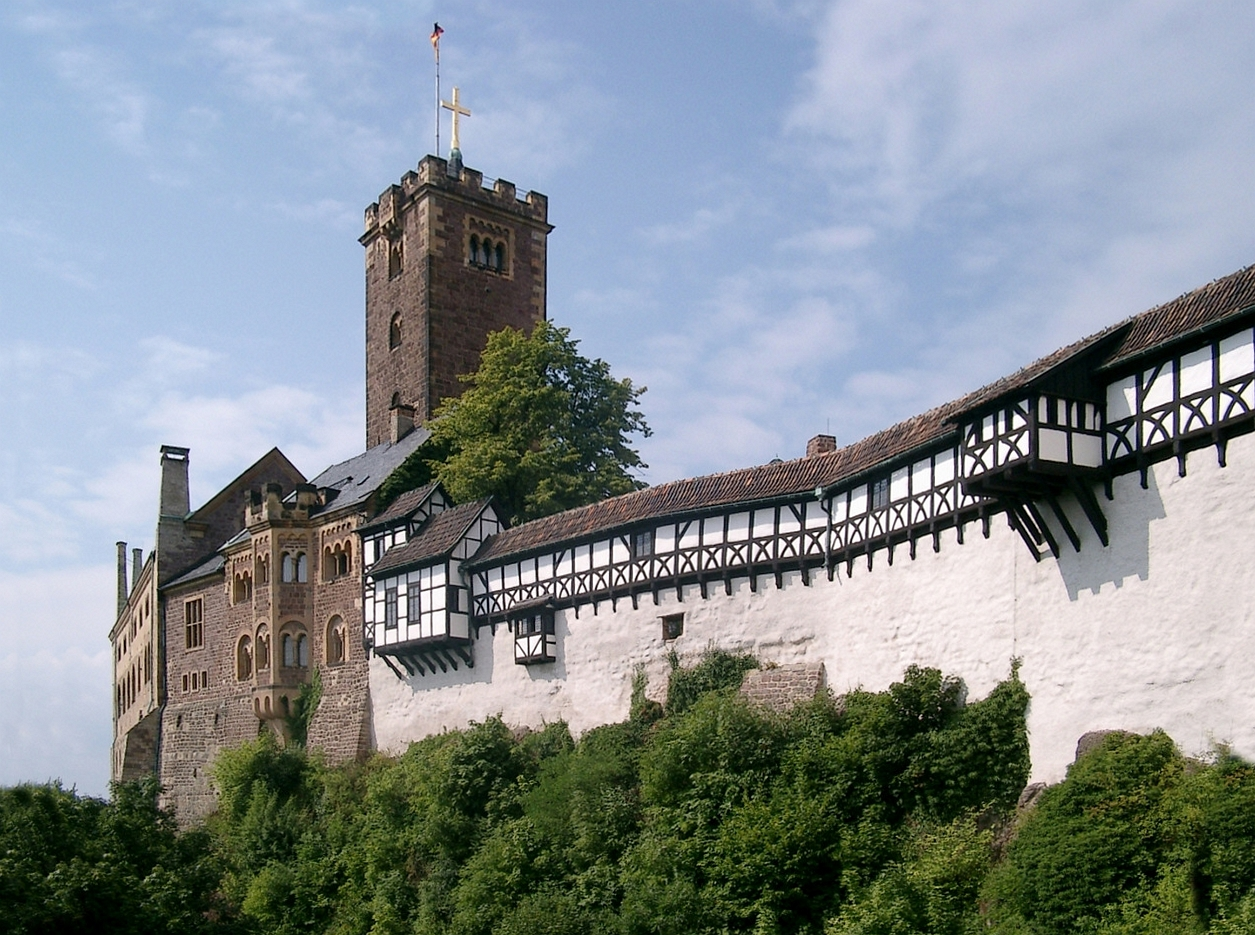
Wartburg Castle

The last Thuringian landgrave Henry Raspe reached his appointment as German governor by the Hohenstaufen emperor Frederick II in 1242. However, when Frederick was declared deposed by Pope Innocent IV in 1246, he secured the support by the archbishops Siegfried III of Mainz and Conrad of Cologne and had himself elected German anti-king. Mocked as rex clericorum his rule remained disputed, though he was able to defeat the troops of Frederick's son Conrad IV he died one year later. His heritage was claimed by both the Wettin margrave Henry III of Meissen, son of Judith of Thuringia, and Duchess Sophie of Brabant, daughter of late Landgrave Louis IV - a conflict that led to the War of the Thuringian Succession.

As a result, Henry of Meissen gained the bulk of Thuringia in 1264, while the Hessian possessions of the landgraves were separated as the Landgraviate of Hesse under the rule of Sophie's son Henry I. The Meissen margraves of the Wettin dynasty retained the landgravial title. Upon the death of Margrave Frederick III of Meissen his younger brothers divided their heritage in the 1382 Division of Chemnitz, whereby Thuringia passed to Balthasar.

Upon the death of Landgrave Frederick IV in 1440, Thuringia fell to his nephew Elector Frederick II of Saxony. The inheritance conflict with his brother William III led to the 1445 Division of Altenburg and the Saxon Fratricidal War over the Wettin lands. The Thuringian lands fell to William III, but he died childless in 1482. Elector Ernest inherited the landgraviate, uniting the Wettin lands under his rule. By the Treaty of Leipzig (1485), Thuringia was split between the Ernestine and Albertine branches of the Wettin dynasty.

=== Palatinate of Thuringia ===
Dynastic disputes over Thuringia during the 15th century led to the emergence of some additional claims and titles. Already holding not only the Electorate of Saxony but also the symbolic Palatinate of Saxony, the Wettin landgraves of Thuringia also claimed to hold the Palatinate of Thuringia (German: Pfalzgrafschaft Thüringen), a newly coined designation, created in order to strengthen Wettinian positions in some minor regions between their Thuringian and Saxon domains, thus assuming the title Count Palatine of Thuringia (German: Pfalzgraf von Thüringen) and including the Thuringian-palatine symbols into the Wettin coats of arms.

== Rulers ==
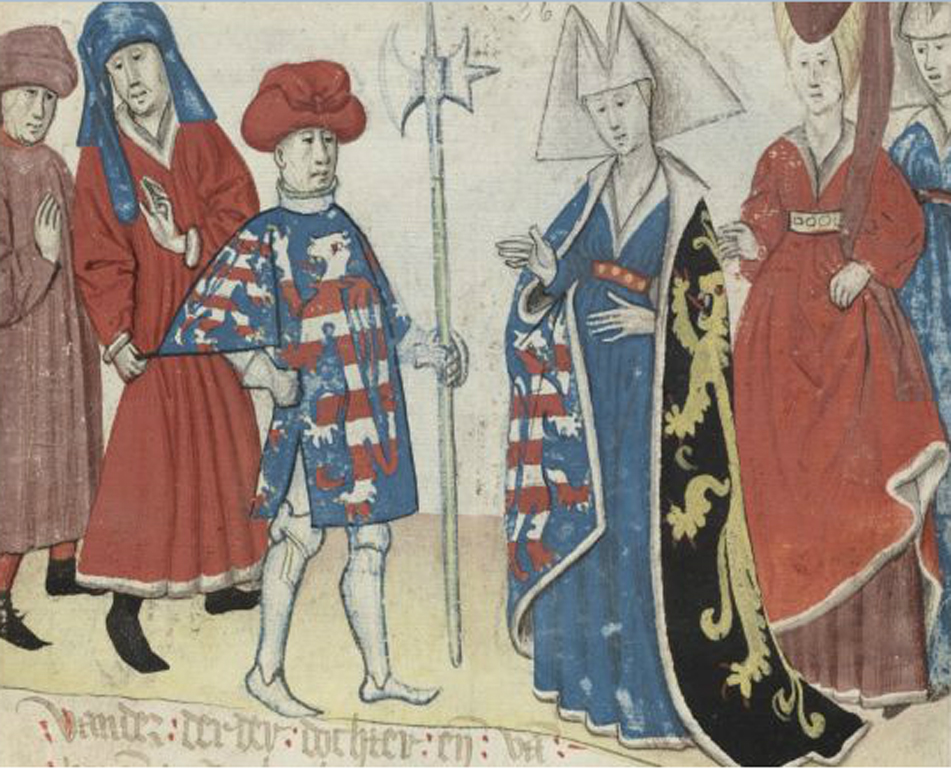
Marriage of the Thuringian landgrave Henry Raspe and Beatrice of Brabant

=== Dukes ===
"Older" stem duchy

- 632–642 Radulf (I)
- 642–687 Heden I
- 687–689 Gozbert
- 689–719 Heden II

"Younger" stem duchy

- 849–873 Thachulf
- 874–880 Radulf (II)
- 880–892 Poppo
- 882–886 Egino (in opposition)
- 892–906 Conrad
- 907–908 Burchard

=== Landgraves ===
- 1111/12 Herman of Winzenburg

Ludovingians

- 1131–1140 Louis I
- 1140–1172 Louis II
- 1172–1190 Louis III
- 1190–1217 Hermann I
- 1217–1227 Louis IV
- 1227–1241 Hermann II
- 1241–1247 Henry Raspe

House of Wettin

- 1247–1265 Henry III, Margrave of Meissen
- 1265–1294 Albert II, Margrave of Meissen 1288–1292

purchased by King Adolph of Germany 1294–1298

- 1298–1323 Frederick I, Margrave of Meissen, jointly with his brother
  - 1298–1307 Theodoric IV, Landgrave of Lusatia
- 1323–1349 Frederick II, Margrave of Meissen
- 1349–1381 Frederick III, jointly with his brothers
  - 1349–1382 William I
  - 1349–1406 Balthasar, sole ruler from 1382
- 1406–1440 Frederick IV

== Sources ==
- Blaschke, Karlheinz (2002). "Die Leipziger Teilung der wettinischen Länder von 1485". Beiträge zur Verfassungs- und Verwaltungsgeschichte Sachsens: Ausgewählte Aufsätze von Karlheinz Blaschke. Leipzig: Leipziger Universitätsverlag. pp. 323–335.
- Curta, Florin (1997). "Slavs in Fredegar and Paul the Deacon: Medieval gens or scourge of God?" (PDF). Early Medieval Europe. 6 (2): 141–167. Archived from the original on 2025-07-20.
- Curta, Florin (2001). The Making of the Slavs: History and Archaeology of the Lower Danube Region, c. 500–700. Cambridge: Cambridge University Press.
- Groß, Reiner (2007). Die Wettiner. Stuttgart: Kohlhammer Verlag.
- Heinze, Erich (1925). "Die Entwicklung der Pfalzgrafschaft Sachsen bis ins 14. Jahrhundert". Sachsen und Anhalt: Jahrbuch der Historischen Kommission für die Provinz Sachsen und für Anhalt. 1: 20–63.
- Krusch, Bruno, ed. (1888). Fredegarii et Aliorum Chronica: Vitae Sanctorum. Monumenta Germaniae Historica: Scriptores Rerum Merovingicarum. Vol. 2. Hannover: Impensis bibliopolii Hahniani.
- Nelson, Janet L., ed. (1991). The Annals of St-Bertin. Manchester: Manchester University Press.
- Reuter, Timothy, ed. (1992). The Annals of Fulda. Manchester: Manchester University Press.
- Reuter, Timothy (2013) [1991]. Germany in the Early Middle Ages c. 800–1056. London and New York: Routledge.
- Tebruck, Stefan (2005). "Zwischen Integration und Selbstbehauptung: Thüringen im wettinischen Herrschaftsbereich". Fragen der politischen Integration im mittelalterlichen Europa. Ostfildern: Jan Thorbecke Verlag. pp. 375–412, 589–591.
- Wallace-Hadrill, John Michael, ed. (1960). The fourth book of the Chronicle of Fredegar with its Continuations. London: Thomas Nelson.
- Whaley, Joachim (2012a). Germany and the Holy Roman Empire, I: From Maximilian I to the Peace of Westphalia 1493-1648. Vol. 1. New York: Oxford University Press.
- Whaley, Joachim (2012b). Germany and the Holy Roman Empire, II: From the Peace of Westphalia to the Dissolution of the Reich 1648-1806. Vol. 2. New York: Oxford University Press.
- Wilson, Peter H. (2016). Heart of Europe: A History of the Holy Roman Empire. Cambridge: Harvard University Press.
