= Ludovingians =

Noble family

The Ludovingian coat of arms showed a lion rampant barry (variously of seven, eight, nine or ten; shown here: of eight) argent and gules, the so-called lion of Hesse.

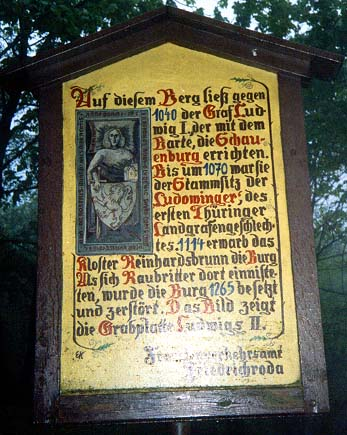
Information board at the ruins of the Ludovingian family castle, the Schauenburg near Friedrichroda

The Ludovingians or Ludowingians (German: Ludowinger) were the ruling dynasty of Thuringia and Hesse during the 11th to 13th centuries.

Their progenitor was Louis the Bearded who was descended from a noble family whose genealogy cannot be precisely determined. Like the related Reginbodo family, they had a close relationship with the Archbishopric of Mainz and also had estates on the Middle Main.

The male line of Ludovingians was extinguished on the death of Henry Raspe in 1247, leading to the War of the Thuringian Succession.

== History ==
Around 1040 Louis the Bearded received a fief north of the Thuringian Forest and had the (now ruined) castle of Schauenburg near Friedrichroda. However these origins are legendary and based solely on unverifiable Reinhardsbrunn sources.

Around 1080, Louis' sons, Louis the Springer and Beringer of Sangerhausen, founded the Abbey of Kloster Schönrain in the land of their ancestors, Main Franconia. In a deed dated 1100 the brothers are named as the counts of Schauenburg.

In the period that followed, the Ludovingians expanded their possessions in Thuringia, for example around Sangerhausen, the estate of Cecilia, wife of Louis the Bearded (who died around 1080), and around estates on the River Unstrut, that Adelheid, that the widow of Count Palatine Frederick III, had left to Louis the Springer in her will. The latter built the castle of Wartburg (first mentioned in 1080) above Eisenach as his new seat of residence and in 1085 founded Reinhardsbrunn, henceforth the house monastery of the family.

In the stormy period of the Investiture Controversy, Louis the Springer was one of the leading opponents of Emperor Henry V. The distinct anti-imperial stance of the Ludovingians, their prominent political position and other factors led Wolfgang Hartmann vertretene to propose that, amongst the famous benefactors portrayed in Naumburg Cathedral, were the statues of the founder of the Wartburg, Louis and his wife Adelheid.

Even before 1122 the family's territory expanded under Louis' sons, Louis and Henry, acquiring estates near Marburg and Kassel, especially through the marriage of Louis I (d 1140) to Hedwig of Gudensberg, the daughter and heiress of the Hessian gaugrave ("gau count"), Giso IV, on the basis of which, after the death of Giso V in 1137, the vast inheritance of the House of Giso (Gisonen) and the counts of Werner in North Hesse was added to their domain. The link thus established between Thuringia and large parts of Hesse was not severed until the War of the Thuringian Succession. Until 1247, the Hessian estate of the Ludovingians was largely ruled by the younger brothers of the landgraves, who bore the title of Count of Gudensberg and of Hesse and in resided in Gudensberg and Marburg; they included Henry Raspe I, Henry Raspe II, Henry Raspe III and Conrad Raspe.

In 1131, Louis was elevated by Emperor Lothair (of Supplinburg) to the rank of landgrave and became Louis I. As a consequence, Thuringia, as an imperially immediate territory, left the Duchy of Saxony, and the Ludovingians took on a ducal-like status in Thuringia. Around the middle of the 12th century, the landgravial minting capital of Eisenach was established and, somewhat later, the Gotha Mint as the second mint owned by the Ludovingians. Under Louis II and Louis III the territory of the landgraviate was further expanded, whilst Hermann I sought to strengthen the position of his family politically, for example, through the marriages of his children. Prior to that, Hermann had to resist attempts by Emperor Henry VI, to turn the Landgraviate of Thuringia into a fiefdom following the death of Hermann's brother, Louis III.

Hermann's son, Louis IV, who married the subsequently beatified Elizabeth of Hungary, hoped that, through the guardianship of his nephews, Henry Margrave of Meissen and a minor, to gain the March of Meissen. In 1226 he was indeed promised the enfeoffment of the March, but died the same year before he was able to actually acquire it.

In 1241, following the death of Louis IV's son, the only 19-year-old Hermann II, Louis' brother, Henry Raspe, inherited the Landgraviate, which he had already ruled as regent during the minority of his nephew. A second brother, Conrad Raspe, ruled the Hessian estates of the family, but entered the Teutonic Order in 1234, soon becoming its Hochmeister. Henry Raspe, who in 1246 was elected as the German antiking, died in 1247. On his death the male line of the Ludovingians died out. In 1243, Henry Raspe had already arranged for his nephew, Henry, the Margrave of Meissen, to be enfeoffed with the Landgraviate of Thuringia. In 1249, Henry was able to secure his claims in Thuringia after military operations that ended in the Treaty of Weißenfels. These were not initially recognised, however, by his cousin Sophia of Brabant, the daughter of Louis IV. In 1259, she attempted, with the aid of Albert I of Brunswick, ab 1259 to gain a military foothold in Thuringia. After a heavy defeat at Besenstedt near Wettin in October 1263 she finally had to give up all claims to Thuringia in 1264, was successful in securing the claims of her son, Henry to the family's Hessian estate, which as the Landgraviate of Hesse became independent and, in 1291, an imperial principality.

== List of reigning Ludovingians counts and landgraves ==
- 1031–1056 Louis the Bearded (Count of Schauenburg)
- 1056–1123 Louis the Springer (Count of Schauenburg)
- 1123–1140 Louis I (1st landgrave, from 1131)
- 1140–1172 Louis II the Iron
- 1172–1190 Louis III the Pious
- 1190–1217 Hermann I
- 1217–1227 Louis IV the Saint
- 1227–1241 Hermann II
- 1241–1247 Henry Raspe

== See also ==
- History of Thuringia
- List of rulers of Thuringia
- Babenbergs

== Literature ==
- Karlheinz Blaschke (1991). "Ludowinger". Lexikon des Mittelalters, V: Hiera-Mittel bis Lukanien (in German). Stuttgart and Weimar: J. B. Metzler. col. 2169. ISBN 3-7608-8905-0.
- Walter Heinemeyer (1987). "Ludowinger". Neue Deutsche Biographie (in German). Vol. 15. Berlin: Duncker & Humblot. pp. 307–309. (full text online).
- Josef Heinzelmann gemeinsam mit Manuel Aicher: Wolf cum barba. In: Archiv für Familiengeschichtsforschung. Vol. 6, 2002, pp. 19–23 (zur These von Armin Wolf, Ludwig der Bärtige stamme von Ludwig von Mousson).
- Josef Heinzelmann, Nachträge zu: Ludwig von Arnstein und seine Verwandtschaft, Zugleich ein Beitrag: Die frühen Ludowinger (Grafen in Thüringen). In: Genealogisches Jahrbuch Vol. 36, 1997, pp 67–73.
- Hans-Joachim Kessler, Konrad Kessler: Auf den Spuren der Thüringer Landgrafen. Sutton Verlag, Erfurt, 2010, ISBN 978-3-86680-668-9.
- Tilo Köhn (ed.): Brandenburg, Anhalt und Thüringen im Mittelalter. Askanier und Ludowinger beim Aufbau fürstlicher Territorialherrschaften. Böhlau, Cologne-Weimar-Vienna, 1997, ISBN 3-412-02497-X, pp. 241–294.
- Hans Patze und Walter Schlesinger: Geschichte Thüringens. Zweiter Band, erster Teil. Cologne, 1974, pp. 10–41, ISBN 3-412-02974-2
- Jürgen Petersohn: Die Ludowinger. Selbstverständnis und Memoria eines hochmittelalterlichen Reichsfürstengeschlechts. In: Blätter für deutsche Landesgeschichte. Vol. 129, 1993, pp 1–39.
- Wilfried Warsitzka: Die thüringer Landgrafen. Verlag Dr. Bussert & Stadeler, Jena, 2003, ISBN 978-3-932906-22-0
- Reinhard Zöllner: Die Ludowinger und die Takeda. Feudale Herrschaft in Thüringen und Kai no kuni Dieter Born, 1995, ISBN 3-922006-09-4
