= Hedwig of Gudensberg =

Consort of Thuringia from 1123 to 1140

- Born: 1098
- Died: 1148 (aged 49–50)
- Noble family: Gisones
- Spouse: Louis I, Landgrave of Thuringia
- Issue: Louis II, Landgrave of Thuringia; Judith of Thuringia
- Father: Giso IV, Count of Gudensberg
- Mother: Kunigunde of Bilstein

Hedwig of Gudensberg, also known as Hedwig of Hesse (1098–1148) was German regent: she served as regent of Thuringia during the minority of her son Louis II from 1140.

== Life ==
She was the daughter and heiress of Giso IV, Count of Gudensberg (1070 – 12 March 1122), Count of Gudensberg and Hesse and Kunigunde of Bilstein (d. 1138/1140).

Hedwig married in 1110 to Louis, the son of Count Louis the Springer of Thuringia. Her husband was elevated to Landgrave of Thuringia in 1131. After her brother Giso V, Count of Gudensberg, the County of Hesse and the other vast possessions of the Gisones dynasty fell to her and her husband and thus fell to the Thuringian branch of the Ludowingians dynasty.

In 1122, Hedwig's mother, Kunigunde of Bilstein remarried to Henry Raspe I, who was Louis I's younger brother. Kunigunde thus became her daughter's sister-in-law. Via these two marriages, the Thuringian counts inherited an extensive triple heritage:

1. The possessions of the Gisones dynasty to the North of Marburg, including the bailiwick of Wetter
2. A large part of the Lordship of Bilstein south of Marburg, plus the bailiff of Hersfeld Abbey
3. The possessions of the Counts of Werner. This family had died out in 1121 and Hedwig's parents had inherited their possessions. These include the County of Maden-Gudensberg and the post of bailiff of the Fritzlar Cathedral, Hasungen Abbey and Breitenau Abbey

In 1128 Hedwig gave birth to her son Louis II. In 1140, Louis I died and King Conrad III enfeoffed twelve-year-old Louis II with Thuringia. While he was a minor, Hedwig acted as regent.

In 1148, Hedwig founded Ahnaberg Abbey, together with her second son Henry Raspe II, who at the time administered the parts of Hesse held by the Ludowingians. A settlement grew between this abbey and the former Franconian royal court Chasalla (from Latin: Castellum, "castle"), on the left bank of the Fulda and this settlement developed into the city of Kassel, which became the capital of Hesse in the 13th century.
