= Landgraviate of Hesse =

State of Holy Roman Empire

Landgraviate of Hesse Landgrafschaft Hessen (German)
- 1264–1567
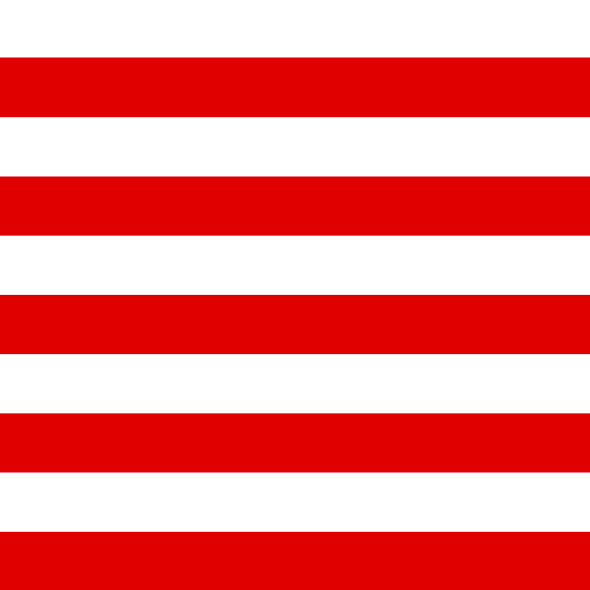
- Flag Coat of arms

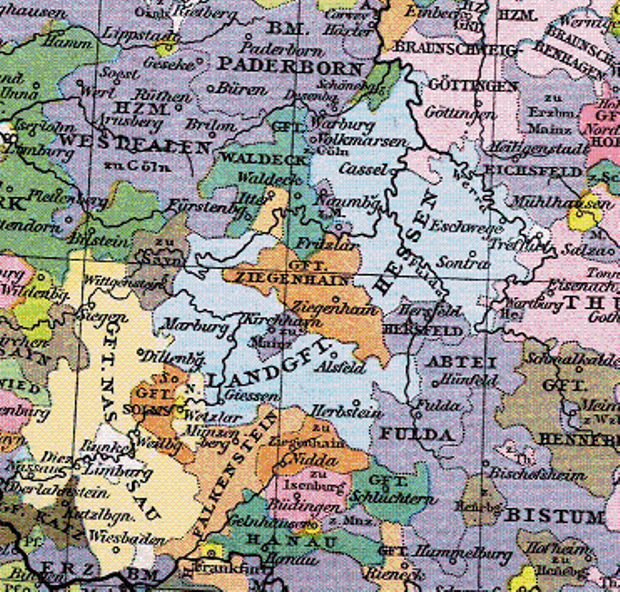
- Landgraviate of Hesse (blue), about 1400
- Status: State of the Holy Roman Empire
- Capital: Marburg, Gudensberg, Kassel (from 1277)
- Religion: Catholicism, Reformed
- Government: Feudal monarchy
- Landgrave
  - 1264–1308: Henry I the Child (first)
  - 1509–1567: Philip I the Magnanimous (last)
- Historical era: Middle Ages, Reformation
  - Partitioned from Duchy of Thuringia: 1264
  - Raised to Principality: 1292
  - Partitioned in two: 1458–1500
  - Reformation: 1526
  - Partitioned in four: 1567
Preceded by
Duchy of Thuringia
Succeeded by
Landgraviate of Hesse-Kassel
Landgraviate of Hesse-Darmstadt
Hesse-Marburg
Hesse-Rheinfels

The Landgraviate of Hesse (German: Landgrafschaft Hessen) was a principality of the Holy Roman Empire. It existed as a single entity from 1264 to 1567, when it was divided among the sons of Philip I, Landgrave of Hesse.

== History ==
In the early Middle Ages, the territory of Hessengau, named after the Germanic Chatti tribes, formed the northern part of the German stem duchy of Franconia, along with the adjacent Lahngau. Upon the extinction of the ducal Conradines, these Rhenish Franconian counties were gradually acquired by Landgrave Louis I of Thuringia and his successors.

After the War of the Thuringian Succession upon the death of Landgrave Henry Raspe in 1247, his niece Duchess Sophia of Brabant secured the Hessian possessions for her minor son Henry the Child. In 1264 he became the first Landgrave of Hesse and the founder of the House of Hesse. The remaining Thuringian landgraviate fell to the Wettin's Henry III, Margrave of Meissen. Henry I of Hesse was raised to the status of prince by King Adolf of Germany in 1292.

From 1308 to 1311, and again from 1458, the landgraviate was divided into Upper Hesse and Lower Hesse. Hesse was re-unified under Landgrave William II in 1500. The Landgraviate rose to primary importance under his son Philip I, also called Philip the Magnanimous, who embraced Protestantism following the 1526 Synod of Homberg and then took steps to create a protective alliance of Protestant princes and powers against the Catholic emperor Charles V. When Philip I died in 1567, Hesse was divided between his sons from his first marriage, which decisively enfeebled its importance.

The new Hessian territories were:

- Hesse-Kassel (or Hesse-Cassel, the Electorate of Hesse from 1803, which was eventually incorporated into the Prussian province of Hesse-Nassau in 1866) to William IV;
- Hesse-Marburg (whose line became extinct in 1604, and was then incorporated into Hesse-Kassel and Hesse-Darmstadt) to Louis IV;
- Hesse-Rheinfels (whose line became extinct in 1583, and was then incorporated into Hesse-Kassel) to Philip II;
- the Landgraviate of Hesse-Darmstadt (known as the Grand Duchy of Hesse from 1806 and the People's State of Hesse from 1918) to George I

The Hessian territories were not re-united until the formation of Greater Hesse (though without Rhenish Hesse) as part of Allied-occupied Germany in 1945.

== See also ==
- Rulers of Hesse
