= Louis II of Thuringia =

Landgrave of Thuringia from 1140 to 1172

Louis II, Landgrave of Thuringia
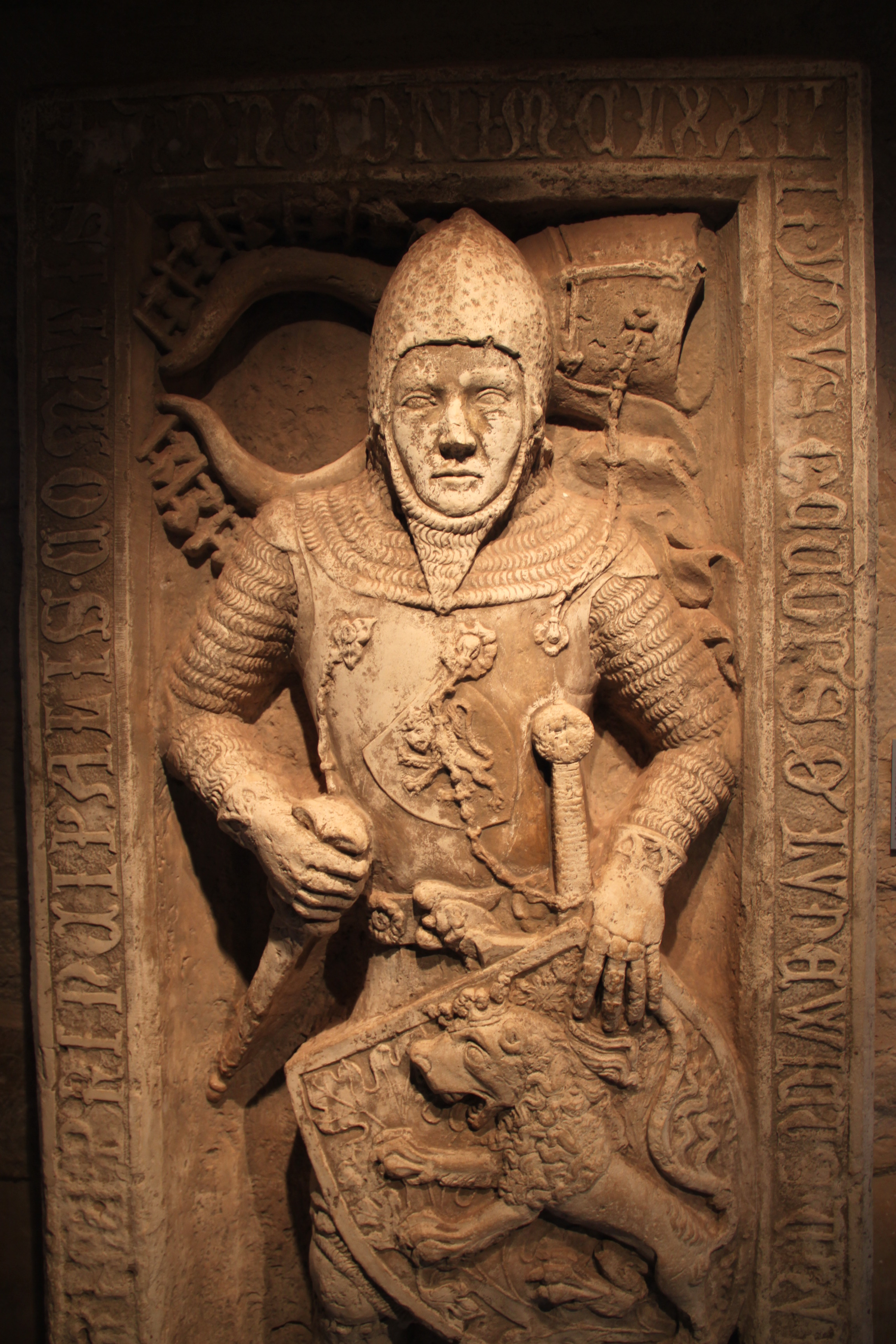
- Epitaph of Louis the Iron at Wartburg Castle, ca. 1340
- Born: 1128
- Died: 14 October 1172; Neuenburg Castle in Freyburg
- Buried: Monastery in Reinhardsbrunn
- Noble family: Ludovingians
- Spouse: Judith of Hohenstaufen
- Issue: Louis III "the Mild"; Henry Raspe III; Frederick; Herman I; Judith; Sophia
- Father: Louis I, Landgrave of Thuringia
- Mother: Hedwig of Gudensberg

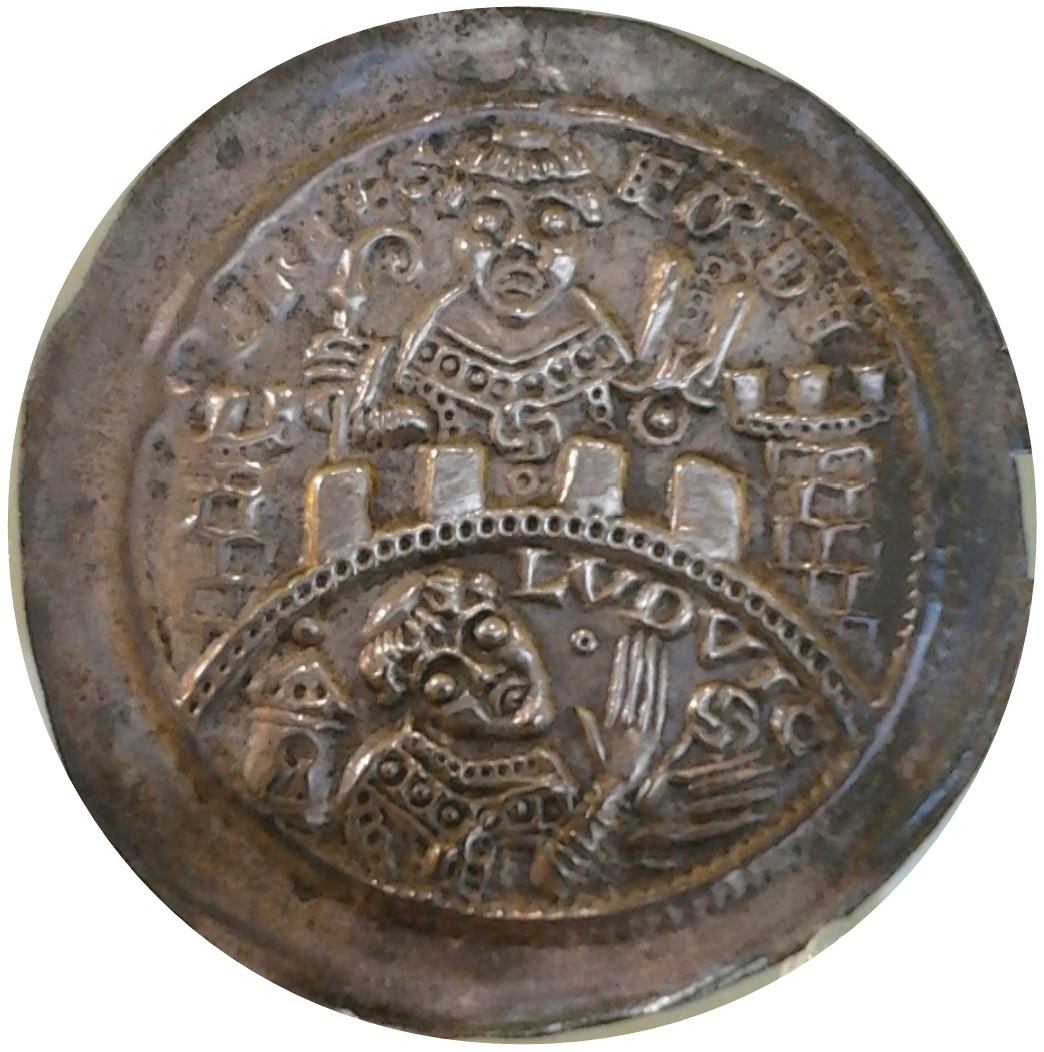
Bracteate of Louis II the Iron (1140–1172), National Museum in Warsaw

Ludwig II, Landgrave of Thuringia, nicknamed Louis the Iron (1128 – 14 October 1172 at Neuenburg Castle in Freyburg).

== Life ==
He was born in 1128, the son of Louis I, who in 1131 became the first landgrave of Thuringia, and his wife, Hedwig of Gudensberg. When Louis I died in 1140, King Conrad III of Germany enfeoffed the 12-year-old Louis II with the landgraviate. The Ludowingians had a good relationship with the Hohenstaufen, because Louis I had supported the election of Conrad III in 1138. The relationship was so good that it was arranged that Louis II should marry Judith, who was a niece of Conrad III and a half-sister of his successor Frederick Barbarossa. Until Conrad's death, Louis II stayed at the royal court, where he was given an education by the archbishop of Mainz and the bishop of Merseburg. He married Judith in 1150, and a year later his son and successor Louis III was born.

During Louis II's reign, the population of Thuringia was frequently bullied and harassed by the nobility. Louis began to intervene against these practises, earning him his nickname "Louis the Iron". According to a legend, which was recorded by Johannes Rothe in 1421, Louis II was travelling anonymously and one night, he found shelter with a blacksmith in Ruhla. The blacksmith, as he worked the iron in his forge, complained about the people's plight and cursed the nobility, lamenting that their lord was too soft towards them, and addressed the iron as if it were the landgrave himself: "Landgraf, werde hart!" (German: "Landgrave, become hard!" or "Landgrave, take a stance!") These words spurred Louis into action against the robber barons. According to the legend, after the offenders had been arrested, they were harnessed to a plough and forced to plough a field.

During his reign, Louis was allied with his brother-in-law Frederick Barbarossa, who became king in 1152 and was crowned emperor in 1155. They fought together against the Guelph Duke Henry the Lion and the archbishops of Mainz (who held Erfurt, among other possessions).

The Wartburg was further extended during Louis II's reign. The palace was constructed in its present form — radiocarbon dating shows that the oaks for the roof beams were felled in 1157. In 1168, he built Runneburg Castle in Weißensee and in 1184 he built Creuzburg Castle.

In 1170, Frederick and Louis undertook an expedition against Poland. After Louis's return, he fell ill and he died on 14 October 1172. Like almost all Thuringian landgraves, he was buried in the monastery in Reinhardsbrunn. Tomb stones for members of the family were transferred to the St. George church in Eisenach when the monastery was demolished.

== Marriage and issue ==
In 1140, Louis II married Judith of Hohenstaufen, a half-sister of Emperor Frederick Barbarossa. They had the following children:

- Louis III "the Mild" (1151–1190), his successor
- Henry Raspe III (c. 1155 – 18 July 1180), Count of Gudensberg
- Frederick (c. 1155 – 1229), Count of Ziegenhain
- Herman I (c. 1155 – 1217)
- Judith, married Herman II, Count of Ravensberg
- Sophia, married Bernhard, Count of Anhalt

== Sources ==
- Heinrich Wolfgang Behrisch: Leben Conrads des Großen, Markgrafens zu Meißen und Ludwigs des Eisernen, Landgrafens in Thüringen, Hilscher, Dresden, 1776 (Online)
- Helga Wäß: Grabplatte für Landgraf Ludwig II., den Eisernen. in: Form und Wahrnehmung mitteldeutscher Gedächtnisskulptur im 14. Jahrhundert. Ein Beitrag zu mittelalterlichen Grabmonumenten, Epitaphen und Kuriosa in Sachsen, Sachsen-Anhalt, Thüringen, Nord-Hessen, Ost-Westfalen und Südniedersachsen (in zwei Bänden), vol. 2: Katalog ausgewählter Objekte vom Hohen Mittelalter bis zum Anfang des 15. Jahrhunderts, Tenea Verlag, Berlin, 2006, ISBN 3-86504-159-0, p. 531–542
- Karl Robert Wenck (1884). "Ludwig II. (Landgraf von Thüringen)" . Allgemeine Deutsche Biographie (in German). Vol. 19. Leipzig: Duncker & Humblot. pp. 591–592.
- Walter Heinemeyer (1987). "Ludwig II. der Eiserne, Landgraf von Thüringen". Neue Deutsche Biographie (in German). Vol. 15. Berlin: Duncker & Humblot. pp. 420–420.
- Knochenhauer, Theodor (1871). Geschichte Thüringens Zur Zeit Des Ersten Landgrafenhauses (1039-1247). Gotha.
- Loud, Graham A.; Schenk, Jochen, eds. (2017). The Origins of the German Principalities, 1100–1350: Essays by German Historians. Routledge.
- Lyon, Jonathan R. (2013). Princely Brothers and Sisters: The Sibling Bond in German Politics, 1100-1250. Cornell University Press.
- Galletti, Johann Georg A. (1784). Geschichte Thüringens.
- Mägdefrau, Werner (2010). Thüringen im Mittelalter 1130-1310 Von den Ludowingern zu den Wettinern. Jena: Rockstuhl. ISBN 978-3-86777-152-8.
- Warsitzka, Wilfried (2002). Die Thüringer Landgrafen. Dr. Bussert & Stadeler. ISBN 978-3932906220.

Louis II of Thuringia Ludowingians Born: 1128 Died: 14 October 1172
Preceded by Louis I	Landgrave of Thuringia; 1140–1172	Succeeded by Louis III
