= Giso IV, Count of Gudensberg =

- Born: c. 1070
- Died: 12 March 1122
- Noble family: Gisones
- Spouse: Kunigunde of Bilstein
- Issue: Hedwig; Giso V
- Father: either Giso II or Giso III
- Mother: Mathilda

Giso IV, Count of Gudensberg (c. 1070 – 12 March 1122) was a German nobleman. He was a Count in the Upper Lahngau and from 1121, he was Count of Gudensberg in Lower Hesse and Imperial Standard Bearer. During his lifetime, the Gisones dynasty reached the peak of its power, its largest territorial expanse and the largest number of bailiff positions.

Giso IV was first mentioned in a document dated 1099, as the son of Countess Matilda from her first marriage with either Giso II or Giso III. She later married Count Adalbert of Saffenberg, a Count in the Ahr valley. After he died in 1109, she lived at Hollende Castle, the ancestral seat of the Gisones near Wetter, north of Marburg, where she died in 1110.

Giso IV married Kunigunde, the daughter of Count Rugger II of Bilstein. Her mother, whose name is unknown, was probably a daughter of Count Werner III of Gudensberg. Giso IV acquired considerable possessions and bailiwicks via her, mostly in the Werra area, the Upper Lahngau and on the Rhine — among these were the advocatus positions over Hersfeld Abbey and the St. Florins church in Koblenz.

In contemporary documents, Giso IV is often mentioned together with Count Werner IV of Maden and Gudensberg. Both were confidants of Emperor Henry IV. Even after Henry V forced Henry IV to abdicate in 1105, Giso IV remained loyal to Henry IV. In 1114, he went to war against Frederick I, Archbishop of Cologne, who supported the Pope in the Investiture Controversy. He did considerable damage to Grafschaft Abbey in the Sauerland region.

Later, Giso IV and Werner IV switched sides. Between 1115 and 1118, they recognized the Archbishop Adalbert of Mainz, an avowed opponent of the Emperor in the Investiture Controversy, as liege lord for all of their formerly imperial fiefs in Upper and Lower Hesse, including Hollende Castle, the ancestral seat of the Gisones. This brought Mainz considerably closer to its aim of dominating a large, contiguous territory in Hesse.

Werner IV died without a male heir on 22 February 1121. Giso IV inherited his possessions, probably based on his marriage to Kunigunde of Bilstein. Later that year, Giso IV is first mentioned as Comes de Udenesberc ("Count of Gudensberg").

Giso IV had two children from his marriage to Kunigunde of Bilstein:

- Hedwig. In 1110 she married Count Louis of Thuringia, who later became the first Landgrave of Thuringia
- Giso V, who succeeded his father as Count of Gudensberg

Giso IV died on 12 March 1122. His son, Giso V, inherited his possessions. While he was still a minor, he stood under the guardianship of his stepfather Henry Raspe I of Thuringia, whom Kunigunde had married in 1123. Henry Raspe I also held the office of Imperial Standard Bearer.

It is unclear whether Giso inherited the counties of Maden and Gudensberg and the office of Imperial Standard Bearer because of his marriage with Kunigunde, or for some other reason. However, his marriage seems to be the most plausible explanation.
