= Louis I of Thuringia =

Ruler of Thuringia from 1123 to 1140

Louis I, Landgrave of Thuringia
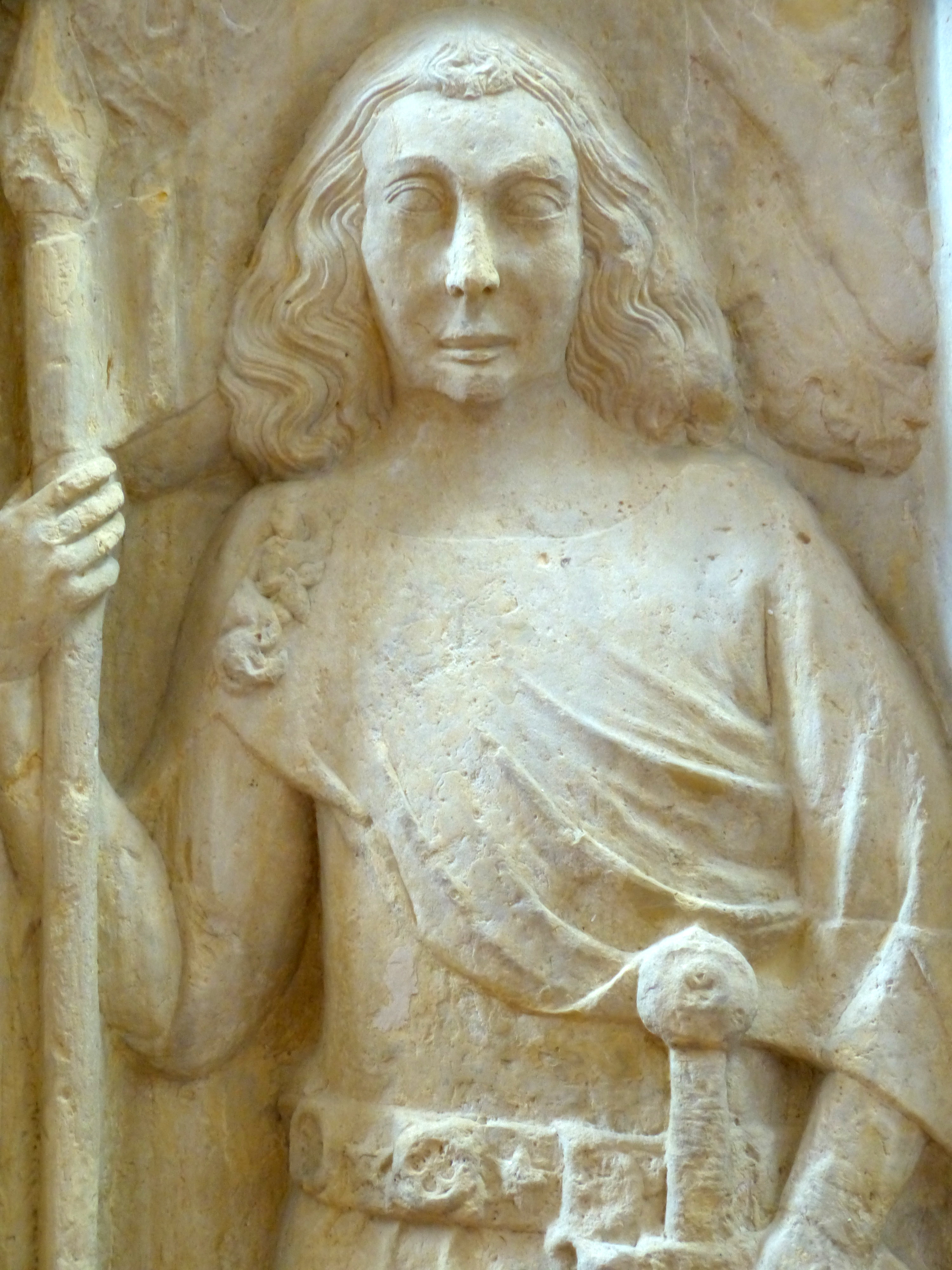
- Louis I, Landgrave of Thuringia Statue
- Born: (?) (?)
- Died: 12 January 1140
- Buried: Abbey of Reinhardsbrunn
- Noble family: Ludovingians
- Spouse: Hedwig of Gudensberg
- Issue: Louis II, Landgrave of Thuringia; Judith of Thuringia
- Father: Louis the Springer
- Mother: Adelheid of Stade

Louis I (died January 12, 1140) was ruler of Thuringia from 1123 to 1140.

== Biography ==
The son of Count Louis the Springer ("the jumper") and his wife Adelheid, he was appointed Landgrave of Thuringia by the Emperor Lothair III in 1131.

According to the succession in his line he should have been called Louis III, but he won Thuringia for his family and, in case of territorial expansion, it was customary to start counting from one.

Thanks to his marriage with Hedwig of Gudensberg he obtained the rule over an extensive heritage, after the death of his father-in-law, Count Giso IV, which led to the union of Thuringia and Hesse. In 1137 Louis became Landgrave of Hesse-Gudensberg as well.

His close relationship to the King Lothair III favoured his rise into the rank of a prince. After the death of Lothair, in 1137, Louis decided to support the Hohenstaufen in their struggle for power in the Reich against the Welf party. The Landgrave died on January 12, 1140, and was buried inside the abbey of Reinhardsbrunn.

Louis had a daughter, Judith of Thuringia, who married king Vladislaus II of Bohemia.

== Bibliography ==
- Knochenhauer, Theodor (1871). Geschichte Thüringens Zur Zeit Des Ersten Landgrafenhauses (1039-1247). Gotha.
- Galletti, Johann Georg A. (1784). Geschichte Thüringens.
- Mägdefrau, Werner (2010). Thüringen im Mittelalter 1130-1310 Von den Ludowingern zu den Wettinern. Jena: Rockstuhl. ISBN 978-3-86777-152-8.
- Warsitzka, Wilfried (2002). Die Thüringer Landgrafen. Dr. Bussert & Stadeler. ISBN 978-3932906220.

Louis I of Thuringia Ludowingians Died: 12 January 1140
Preceded by Louis the Springer	Landgrave of Thuringia; 1123–1140	Succeeded by Louis II
