= Landgrave =

Noble title used in the Holy Roman Empire and its former territories

Heraldic crown of a landgrave

Landgrave (German: Landgraf, Dutch: landgraaf, Swedish: lantgreve, French: landgrave; Latin: comes magnus, comes patriae, comes provinciae, comes terrae, comes principalis, lantgravius) was a rank of nobility used in the Holy Roman Empire, and its former territories. The German titles of Landgraf, Markgraf ("margrave"), and Pfalzgraf ("count palatine") are of roughly equal rank, subordinate to Herzog ("duke"), and superior to Graf ("count").

== Etymology ==
The English word landgrave is the equivalent of the German Landgraf, from Land 'land' and Graf 'count'.

== Description ==
A landgrave was originally a count who possessed imperial immediacy, that is, a feudal duty owed directly to the Holy Roman Emperor. His jurisdiction stretched over a sometimes quite considerable territory, which was not subservient to an intermediate power, such as a duke, a bishop or count palatine. The title originated within the Holy Roman Empire, and was first recorded in Lower Lotharingia in 1086: Henry III, Count of Louvain, landgrave of Brabant. By definition, a landgrave exercised sovereign rights. His decision-making power was comparable to that of a Duke.

Landgrave occasionally continued in use as the subsidiary title of such noblemen as the Grand Duke of Saxe-Weimar, who functioned as the Landgrave of Thuringia in the first decade of the 20th century, but the title fell into disuse after World War II.

The jurisdiction of a landgrave was a landgraviate (German: Landgrafschaft), and the wife of a landgrave or a female landgrave was known as a landgravine (from the German Landgräfin, Gräfin being the feminine form of Graf).

The term was also used in the Carolinas (what is now North and South Carolina in the United States) during British rule. A "landgrave" was "a county nobleman in the British, privately held North American colony Carolina, ranking just below the proprietary (chartered equivalent of a royal vassal)."

== Examples ==
Examples include:

- Landgraves of Thuringia
  - Landgraves of Hesse and its subsequent divisions (Hesse-Kassel, -Darmstadt, -Rotenburg, -Philippsthal(-Barchfeld), -Rheinfels, -Homburg(-Bingenheim), -Marburg).
- Landgraves of Leuchtenberg, situated around a Bavarian castle (later raised into a duchy)
- Landgraves of Stühlingen
- Landgraves of Klettgau
- Fürstenberg-Weitra
- Fürstenberg-Taikowitz
- Landgraviate of Alsace
  - Upper Alsace
  - Lower Alsace
