= Conrad of Thuringia =

Langrave of Thuringia and Grand Master of the Teutonic Knights

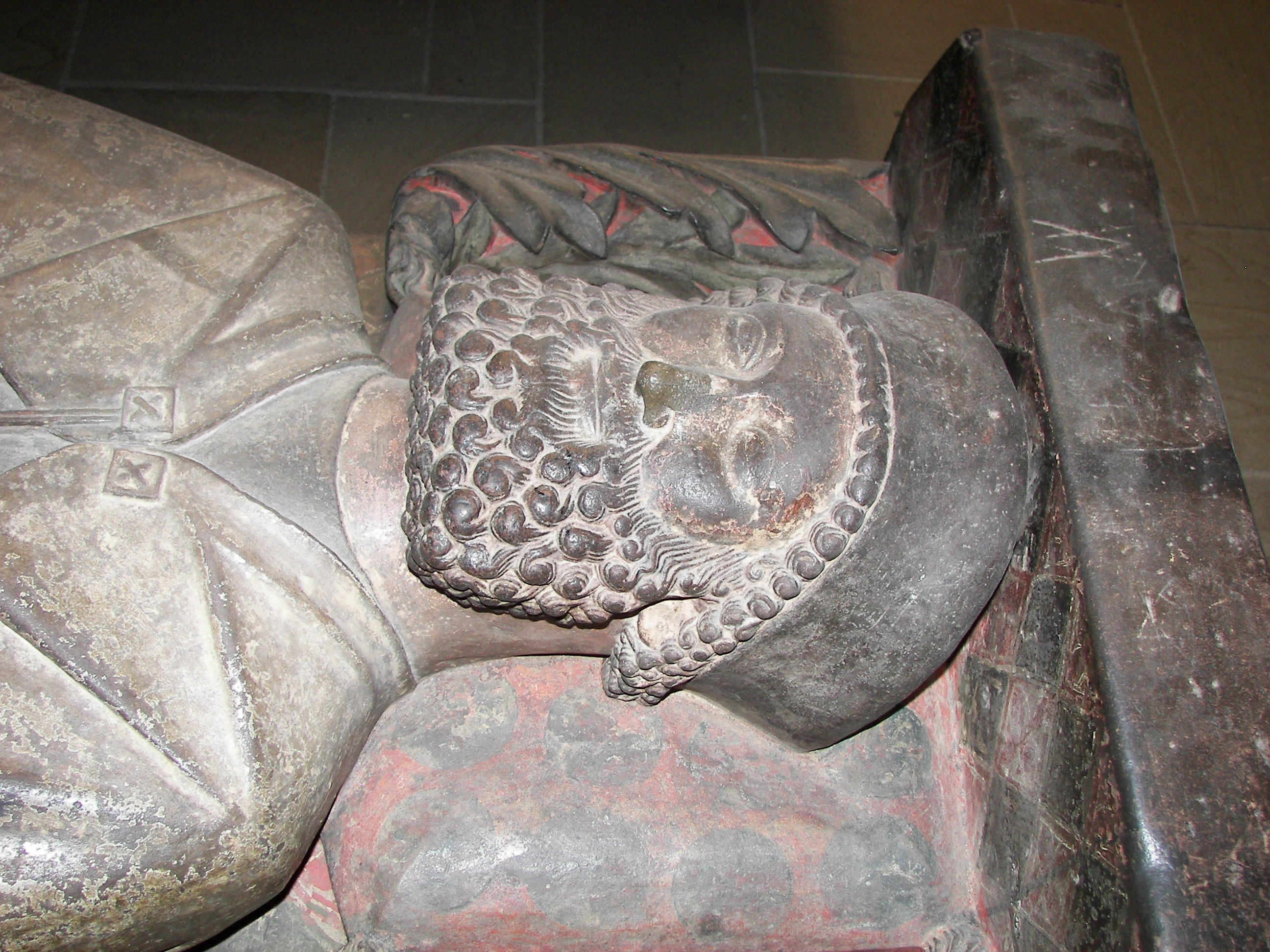
Grave of Konrad von Thüringen at Elisabethkirche, Marburg

Conrad (German: Konrad von Thüringen; c. 1206 – 24 July 1240) was the landgrave of Thuringia from 1231 to 1234 and the fifth Grand Master of the Teutonic Order from 1239 to 1240. He was the first major noble to join the military order.

Conrad was the youngest son of Hermann I, Landgrave of Thuringia, and Sophia, a daughter of Otto I, Duke of Bavaria. His elder brother Louis IV of Thuringia was married to Saint Elisabeth of Hungary. When Louis died in 1227 during the Sixth Crusade, his brother Henry Raspe became regent for Louis' minor son Herman II, and Conrad took on the title of Count of Gudensberg in Hesse, assisting his brother in ruling the area.

On Elisabeth's death in 1231, Henry Raspe took Thuringia for himself, and together with Conrad, worked to consolidate power. Conrad engaged in battle a number of times with Siegfried III, Archbishop of Mainz, at one point personally swinging him around and threatening to cut him in two. In 1232, he besieged the city of Fritzlar, massacring its populace and burning the church.

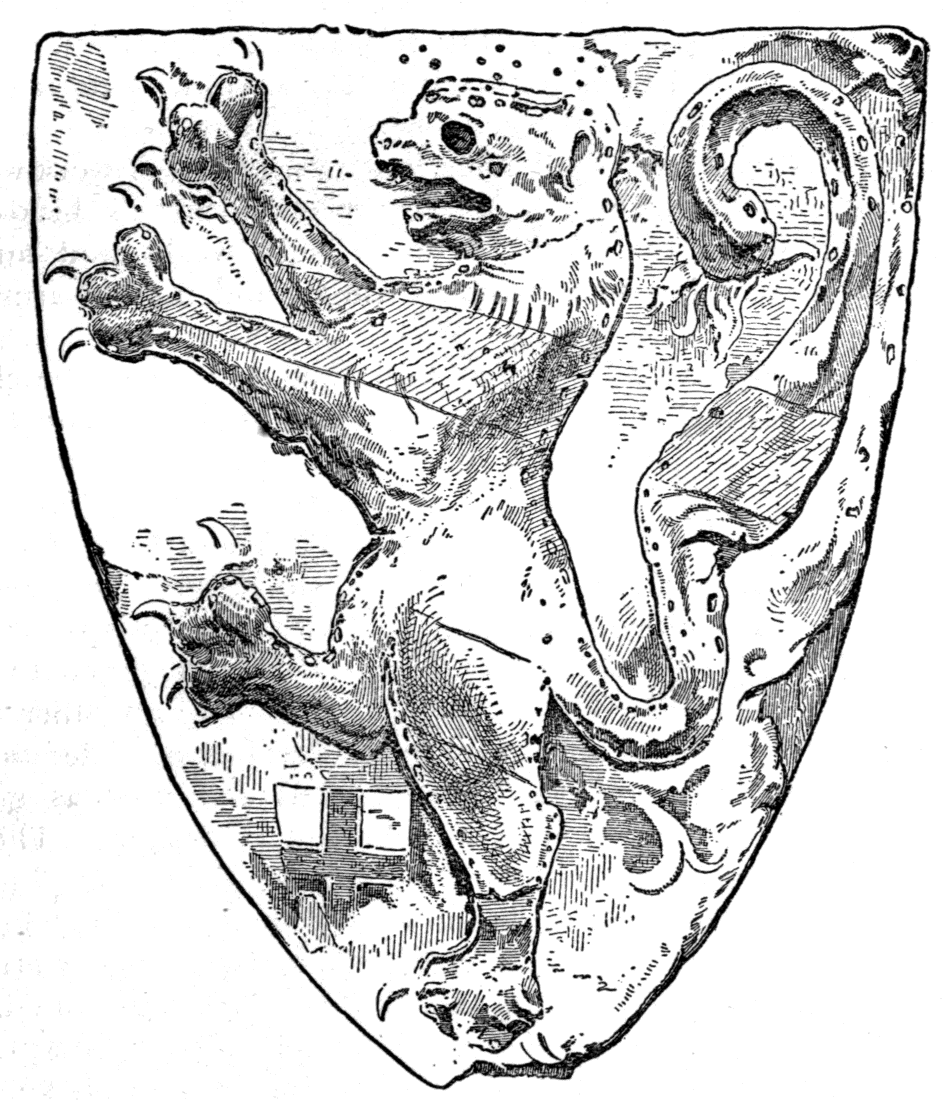
Shield of the Landgrave Konrad of Thuringia

Elisabeth had founded a hospital in Marburg and had intended to bequeath it to the Johanniter Order, but this was rejected by her defensor, Conrad of Marburg. Pope Gregory IX sent a commission to settle the matter, and it decided in favor of Conrad of Marburg on 2 August 1232. In the summer of 1234, Conrad travelled to Rome and convinced the Curia to turn the hospital and parish church in Marburg over to the Teutonic Knights, which had founded a house in the city the previous year. In November, Conrad set aside his temporal title and entered the Teutonic Order himself. The next year, he joined the commission to Rome that represented his sister-in-law in the canonisation process, and he remained in the court of the Pope until Pentecost of 1235 when she was declared a saint.

Upon the death of Hermann von Salza, Conrad became the Grand Master of the Teutonic Knights. While on a trip to Rome in the early summer of 1240, he fell ill and died. He was buried in the Elisabeth Church in Marburg.

Grand Master of the Teutonic Order
Preceded by Hermann von Salza	Hochmeister; 1239–1240	Succeeded by Gerhard von Malberg
