= Louis IV of Thuringia =

Landgrave of Thuringia

Louis IV
- Landgrave of Thuringia
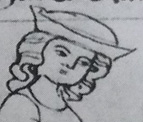
- Louis IV of Thuringia, liber depictus, Český Krumlov, 14th century
- Born: 28 October 1200; Creuzburg Castle, Thuringia
- Died: 11 September 1227 (aged 26); Otranto, Kingdom of Sicily
- Buried: Reinhardsbrunn Abbey
- Noble family: Ludovingians
- Spouse: Elizabeth of Hungary
- Issue: Hermann II, Landgrave of Thuringia; Sophie of Thuringia, Duchess of Brabant; Gertrude of Aldenberg
- Father: Hermann I, Landgrave of Thuringia
- Mother: Sophia of Wittelsbach

Louis IV (German: Ludwig IV. der Heilige; 28 October 1200 – 11 September 1227), a member of the Ludovingian dynasty, was Landgrave of Thuringia and Saxon Count palatine from 1217 until his death. He was the husband of Elizabeth of Hungary.

== Biography ==
Louis was born at Creuzburg Castle, the second son of Landgrave Hermann I of Thuringia, from his marriage with Sophia, a daughter of the Wittelsbach duke Otto I of Bavaria. During the German throne quarrel between the Hohenstaufen ruler Philip of Swabia and his Welf rival Otto IV, his father switched sides several times and tried to expand his own influence by betrothing his eldest son Hermann to the Hungarian princess Elizabeth, daughter of King Andrew II. The young girl arrived in Thuringia in 1211 to be raised at the Ludovingian court, then a venue for poets and minnesingers like Walther von der Vogelweide or Wolfram von Eschenbach.

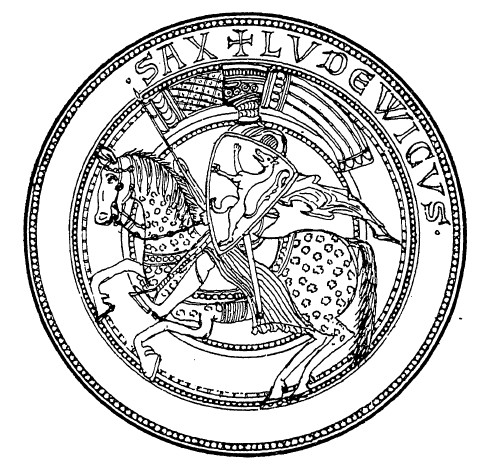
Seal of Louis IV

Louis elder brother died in 1216, therefore he himself, upon his father's death on 25 April 1217, ascended the Thuringian throne at the age of sixteen.

In 1218, on the Feast of St. Kilian, at age eighteen, he was armed as a knight in the Church of St. George in Eisenach. At Wartburg Castle in 1220 at age twenty, Louis married 14-year-old Elizabeth of Hungary, with whom he had three children: Hermann II, Sophie, and Gertrude, later abbess at Altenberg. He set up his court at Wartburg Castle near Eisenach.

When in 1221 Louis' Wettin brother-in-law, Margrave Theodoric I of Meissen died, he acted as a guardian for Theodoric's minor son Henry III. However, his attempts to occupy the Meissen and Lusatian lands were rejected by his sister Jutta. Like his father, Louis was in close contact with the Hohenstaufen emperor Frederick II, who appointed him a Marshal of the Holy Roman Empire and confirmed his rights in the Margraviate of Meissen. Louis came to consider it a religious duty to restrain his nobles from oppressing the poor, and would lay siege to their castles if necessary.

In 1226, Louis was called to the Diet in Cremona, where he promised Emperor Frederick II to take up the cross and accompany him to the Holy Land. He embarked for the Sixth Crusade in 1227, partly inspired also by the tales of his uncle, who had been to the Levant with the Holy Roman Emperor. Fellow-travellers were five counts, Louis von Wartburg, Gunther von Kefernberg, Meinrad von Mühlberg, Heinrich von Stolberg, and Burkhard von Brandenberg (Note: Brandenberg is the name of the family who held the imposing castle Brandenburg at Lauchröden, Thuringia. This castle protected a section of the via regia.); Louis left his pregnant wife behind, who had a premonition that they would never meet again.

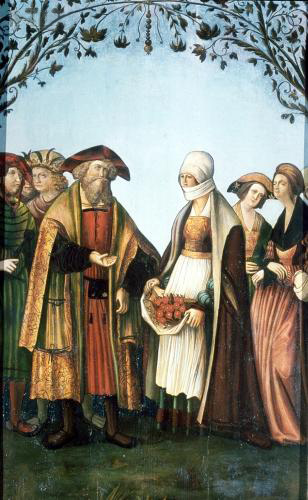
Louis and Elizabeth: Miracle of the roses, altarpiece, Mariahof parish church, 16th century

In August 1227 Louis traversed the mountains between Thuringia and Upper Franconia, through the duchies of Swabia and Bavaria, crossing the Tyrolian Alps. He fell ill of plague after reaching Brindisi and Otranto in the Kingdom of Sicily. He received extreme unction from the Patriarch of Jerusalem and the Bishop of Santa Croce. He died before reaching Otranto in 1227. A few days after his death, his daughter Gertrude was born. Louis's remains were buried in Reinhardsbrunn Abbey in 1228. He was succeeded by his five-year-old son Hermann II, under the tutelage of his uncle Henry Raspe.

After his death, Elizabeth left the court, made arrangements for the care of her children, and in 1228, renounced the world, becoming a tertiary of St. Francis of Assisi. She built the Franciscan hospital at Marburg and devoted herself to the care of the sick until her death at the age of 24 in 1231. He is known as Blessed Louis of Thuringia.

== Family and children ==
He and Elizabeth of Hungary had the following children:

1. Hermann II, Landgrave of Thuringia (1222–1241), married Helen, daughter of Duke Otto I of Brunswick-Lüneburg
2. Sophie of Thuringia (1224–1275), married Duke Henry II of Brabant; their son Henry became the progenitor of the House of Hesse
3. Gertrude (1227–1297), abbess of the Premonstratensian monastery of Altenberg near Wetzlar; she was beatified by Pope Clement VI in 1348.

== Sources ==
- Loud, Graham A.; Schenk, Jochen, eds. (2017). The Origins of the German Principalities, 1100-1350: Essays by German Historians. Routledge.
- Petrakopoulos, Anja (1995). "Sanctity and Motherhood:Elizabeth of Thuringia". In Mulder-Bakker, Anneke (ed.). Sanctity and Motherhood: Essays on Holy Mothers in the Middle Ages. Routledge. pp. 259–297.

== Literature ==
- Walter Heinemeyer: Ludwig IV the Saint, Landgrave of Thuringia and Count Palatine of Saxony. In: New German Biography (NDB). Volume 15, Duncker & Humblot, Berlin, 1987, ISBN 3-428-00196-6, S. 422 f. (digitized).
- Helga aq: Ludwig IV, the Holy, in: shape perception and memory medium German sculpture in the 14th century. A contribution to medieval grave monuments, epitaphs and curiosities in Saxony, Saxony-Anhalt, Thuringia, North Hesse, North-Rhine Westphalia and southern Lower Saxony. Volume 2. Catalog of selected objects from the High Middle Ages to the early 15th century. Tenea Verlag, Berlin 2006, S. 538 f. with Fig. 799 f. ISBN 3-86504-159-0.
- Karl Robert Wenck: Louis IV, Holy, Landgrave of Thuringia. In: General German Biography (ADB). Volume 19, Duncker & Humblot, Leipzig 1884, S. 594–597.

== Sources ==
- Mägdefrau, Werner (2010). Thüringen im Mittelalter 1130-1310 Von den Ludowingern zu den Wettinern. Jena: Rockstuhl. ISBN 978-3-86777-152-8.
- Warsitzka, Wilfried (2002). Die Thüringer Landgrafen. Dr. Bussert & Stadeler. ISBN 978-3932906220.
- Knochenhauer, Theodor (1871). Geschichte Thüringens Zur Zeit Des Ersten Landgrafenhauses (1039-1247). Gotha.
- Galletti, Johann Georg A. (1784). Geschichte Thüringens.

Louis IV of Thuringia Ludovingians Born: 28 October 1200 Died: 11 September 1227
Preceded by Hermann I	Landgrave of Thuringia; 1217–1227	Succeeded by Hermann II
Preceded by Louis I, Duke of Bavaria	Marshal of the Holy Roman Empire; 1221-1227	Succeeded by
