= Agnes of Loon =

Duchess consort of Bavaria (1150–1191)

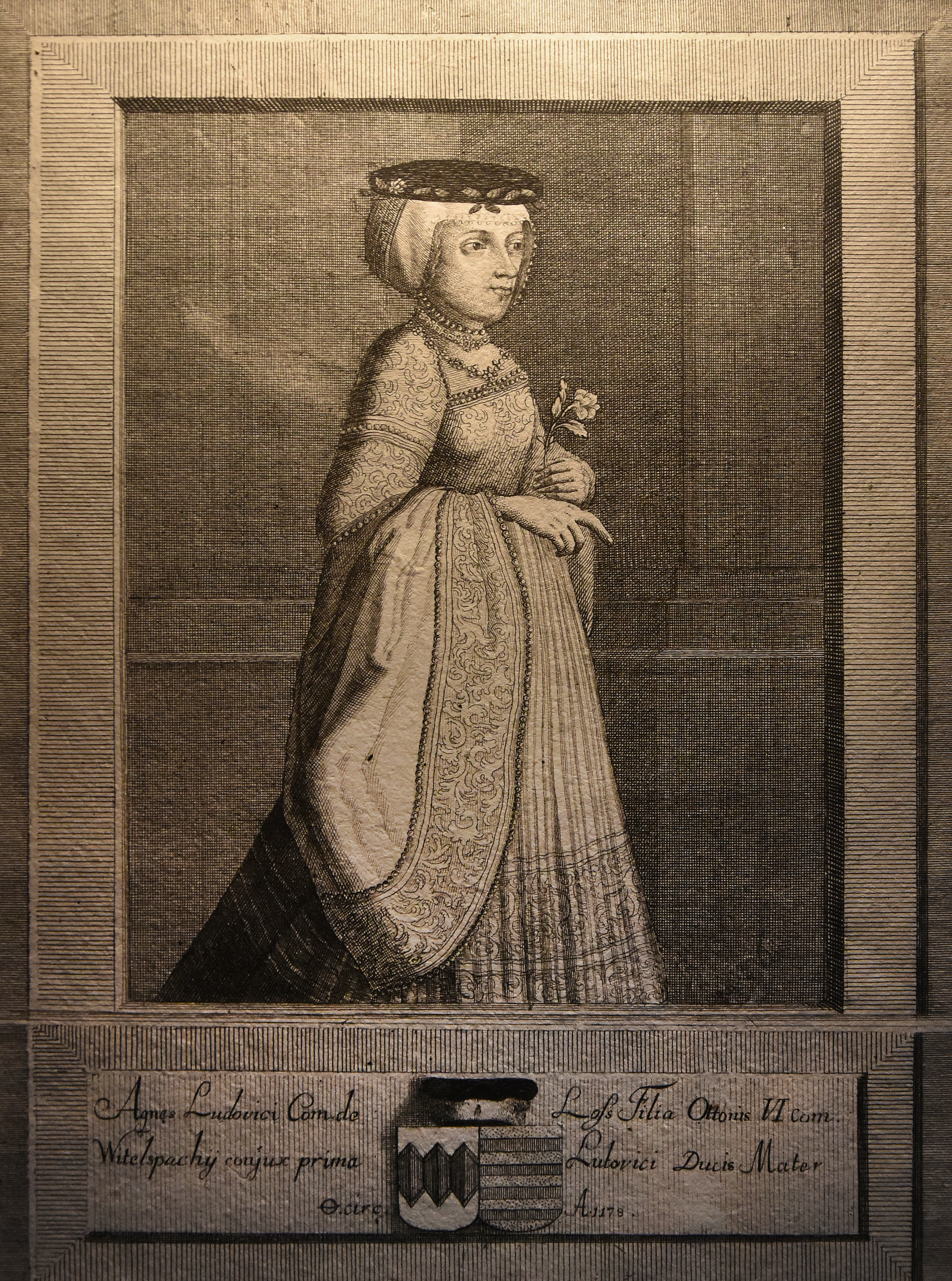
- Born: 1150
- Died: 1191 (aged 40–41)
- Noble family: House of Loon
- Spouse: Otto I of Wittelsbach, Duke of Bavaria
- Issue Detail: Sophia; Richardis; Louis I
- Father: Louis I, Count of Loon
- Mother: Agnes of Metz

Agnes of Loon (1150–1191), was a duchess consort of Bavaria, married to Otto I of Wittelsbach, Duke of Bavaria. She was regent of Bavaria during the minority of her son, Louis I, Duke of Bavaria, from 1183 to 1191.

== Life ==
She was the daughter of Louis I, Count of Loon, and Agnes of Metz.

She was regent of Bavaria during the minority of her son, Louis I, Duke of Bavaria, from 1183 to 1191. Agnes was described as a forceful regent, who managed to secure the inheritance of her son.

Agnes was a patron of the writer Heinrich von Veldeke.

== Issue ==
Agnes and Otto had the following children:

- Otto (1169–1181)
- Sophia (1170–1238), married Landgrave Hermann I of Thuringia (1155–1217),
- Heilika I (b. 1171), married in 1184 to Hallgrave Dietrich of Wasserburg
- Agnes (1172–1200), married Count Henry of Plain (d. 1190)
- Richardis (1173–1231), married in 1186 to Count Otto I of Guelders and Zutphen
- Louis I (1173–1231), married in 1204 to Ludmilla of Bohemia
- Heilika II (b. 1176), married Count Adelbert III of Dillingen (d. 1214)
- Elisabeth (b. 1178), married Count Berthold II of Vohburg (d. 1209)
- Mechtild (1180–1231), married in 1209 to Count Rapoto II of Ortenburg (1164–1231).

== Sources ==
- http://www.guide2womenleaders.com/womeninpower/Womeninpower1150.htm

Agnes of Loon House of Loon Born: 1150 Died: 1191
Royal titles
Preceded by Matilda of England	Duchess consort of Bavaria; 1180–1183	Succeeded by Ludmilla of Bohemia
