= Creuzburg =

- Ortsteil of Amt Creuzburg
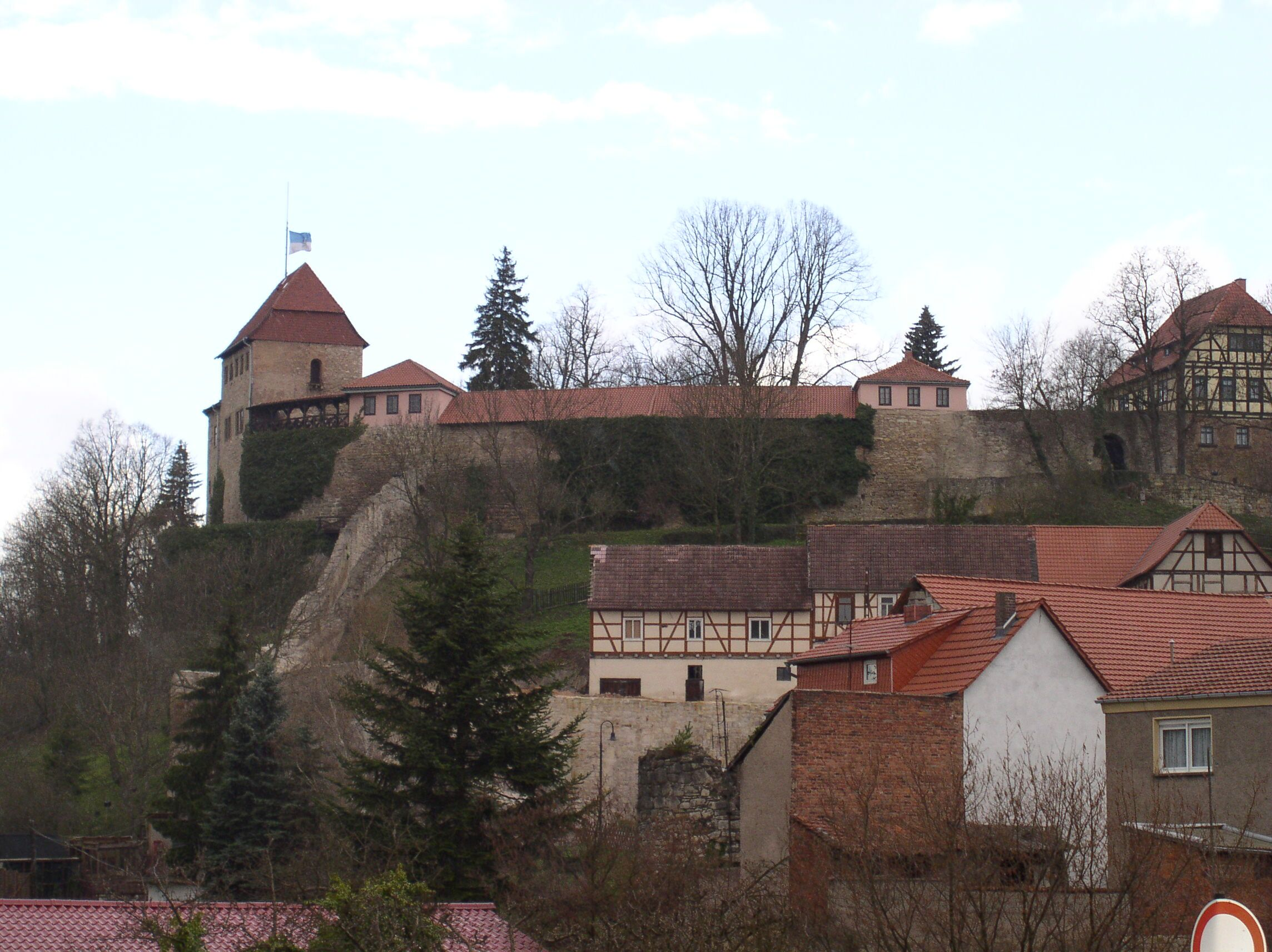
- Creuzburg Castle

- Coat of arms
- Interactive map of Creuzburg
- Location within Germany Location within Thuringia
- Coordinates: 51°3′5″N 10°14′41″E
- Country: Germany
- State: Thuringia
- District: Wartburgkreis
- Town: Amt Creuzburg

Area
  - Total: 35.4 km^{2} (13.7 sq mi)
- Elevation: 200 m (660 ft)

Population (2018-12-31)
  - Total: 2,305
  - Density: 65.1/km^{2} (169/sq mi)
- Time zone: UTC+01:00 (CET)
  - Summer (DST): UTC+02:00 (CEST)
- Postal codes: 99831
- Dialling codes: 036926
- Vehicle registration: WAK
- Website: www.creuzburg-online.de

Creuzburg (German pronunciation: [ˈkʁɔʏtsˌbʊʁk]) is a town and a former municipality on the Werra river in the Wartburgkreis in Thuringia, Germany. Since December 2019, it is part of the town Amt Creuzburg.

== Geography ==
Creuzburg is in the area known as the Muschelkalk. Three mountains, Wisch, Wallstieg and Ebenauer Köpfe are near the town.

Nearby towns include Treffurt and Eisenach.

== History ==
With a history going back over 1,000 years, Creuzburg is one of the oldest towns in Thuringia. Hill graves in the area of the city demonstrate a settlement beginning at least as early as Carolingian times. The beginnings of the settlement on what became the site of the castle are a result of its position on a major crossroads. The old West-East trade route met at the Werra with the trade route from the south. In the 10th and 11th Centuries, the region was under control of the Fulda Abbey.

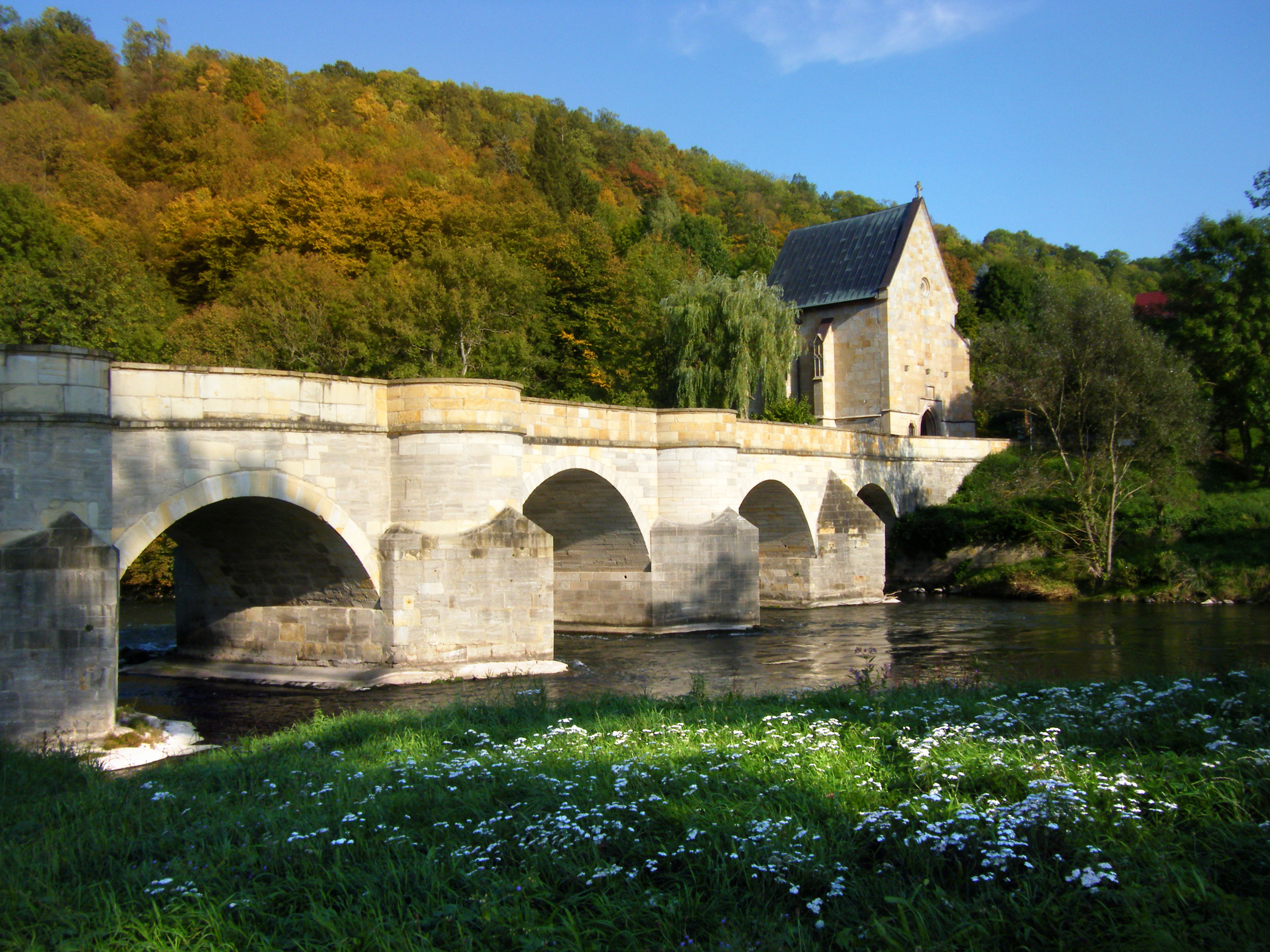
The stone Werra Bridge, built in 1225, and the Liborius Chapel, built in 1499

In 1137, the city came under control of the Thuringian Ludowinger dynasty. Landgrave Ludwig I acquired it in exchange for a portion of the lands he held in Hesse. Recognizing the strategic and economic importance of the area, his successors made improvements to the area. Landgrave Hermann I began the construction of the castle on the mountain and allowed the many farmers in the area to build the settlement at the base of the mountain. In 1213, Creuzburg was established as a city. A coat of arms was established and a defensive wall was built. The nearby town of Scherbda, which now is part of Creuzburg, was first mentioned as a settlement around a fief in 1229.

The most prosperous time in Creuzburg was during the reign of Landgrave Ludwig IV, the Holy, and his son Hermann II. After the wedding of Ludwig with the daughter of the King of Hungary, Elisabeth, who is now known as St. Elisabeth of Hungary, Creuzburg Castle became the second residence of the Thuringian Landgraves (after the Wartburg). Many festivals were celebrated during this time, and the children of the couple were born in the castle. Ludwig redecorated the castle and built the first stone bridge across the Werra to secure the trade route. Before he left for the Crusades in 1227, he bade farewell to his subjects in a major assembly of the Thuringian nobles in the castle.

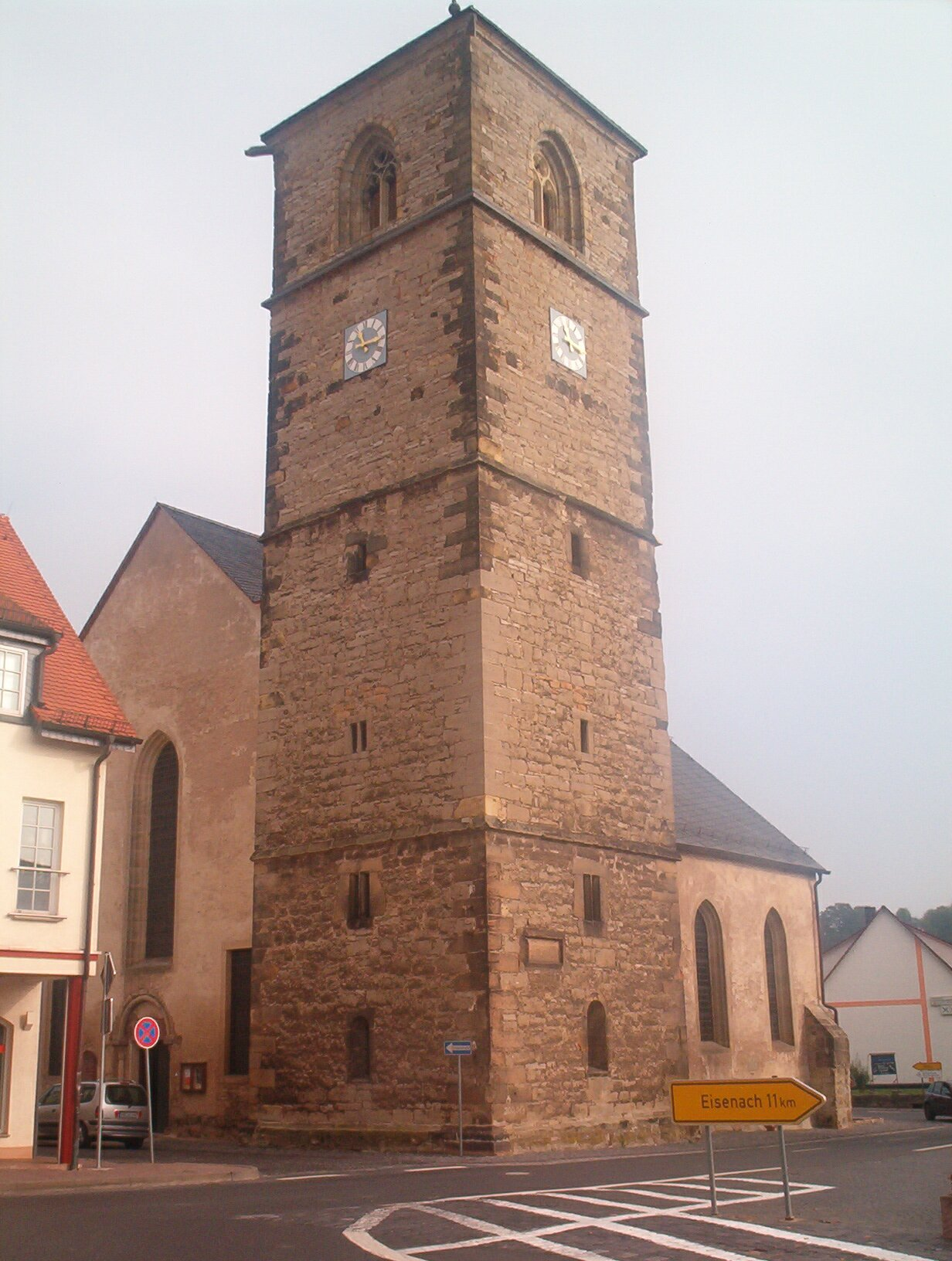
The Nikolaikirche, built in 1215

Ludwig never returned. His brother Heinrich Raspe acted as regent during the childhood of Ludwig's son, Hermann II. Elisabeth left Thuringia and moved back to the Hessian lands, where she later died in Marburg. Upon reaching adulthood, Hermann began his reign as Landgrave of Thuringia and Hesse. Castle remained his residence until his sudden death at the age of 18. His uncle and successor Heinrich Raspe used only the Wartburg as his residence. This, for the city of Creuzburg, as well as the castle, was the end of their times of prosperity. The town sank into economic and cultural anonymity in the following centuries.

Within the German Empire (1871–1918), Creuzburg was part of the Grand Duchy of Saxe-Weimar-Eisenach.

== Tourism ==
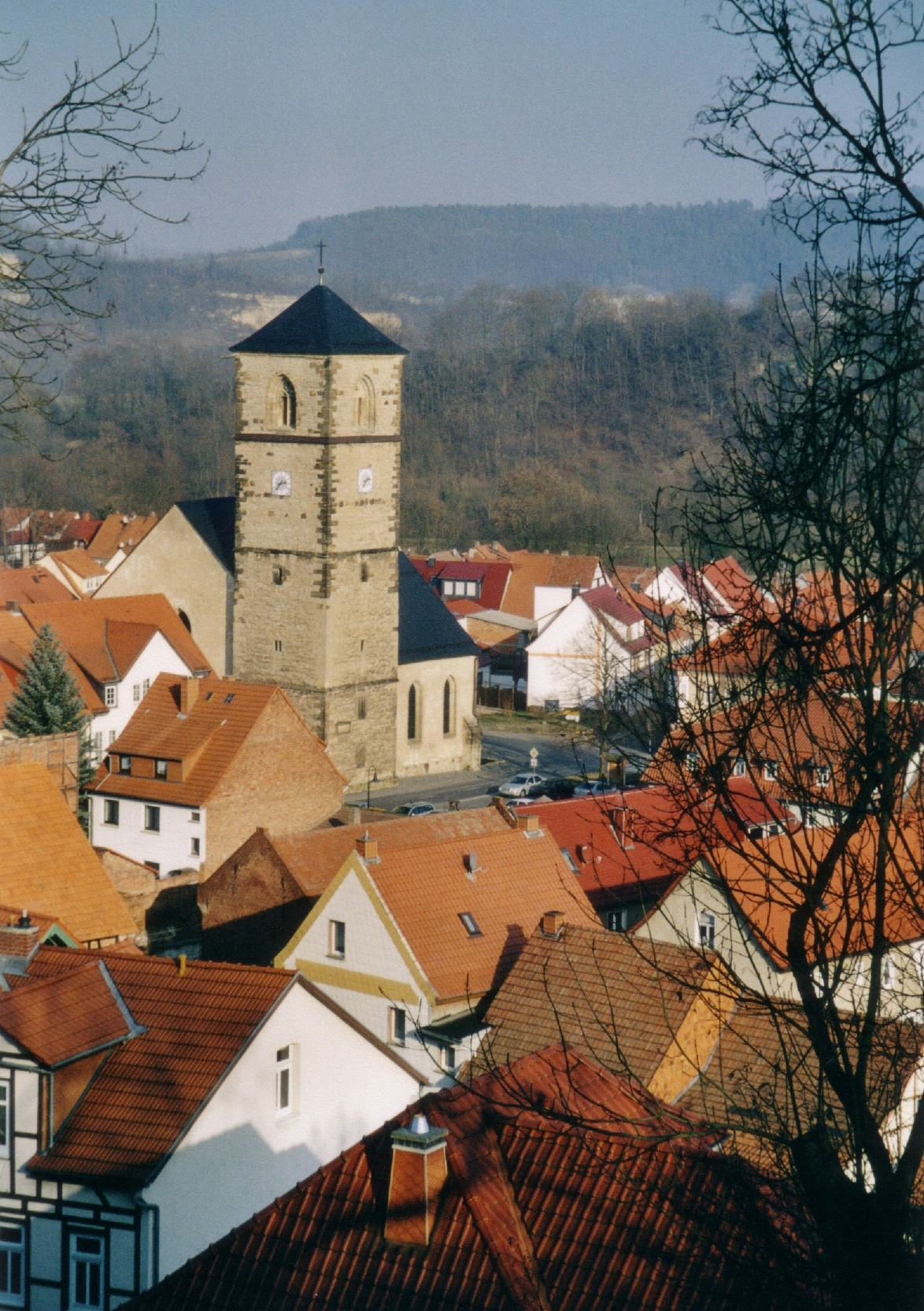
Creuzburg with Nikolaikirche tower

The Creuzburg Castle, which was a residence of the Ludowing dynasty and a favorite visiting place of St. Elisabeth of Hungary, is one of the top sightseeing destinations. Creuzburg also boasts the oldest bridges north of the Main.

== Economy ==
Beside several hotels and restaurants Creuzburg is also the head office of the Pollmeier Massivholz GmbH & CO. KG. The company is the largest and most efficient hardwood sawmill worldwide.

== Transportation ==
The B 7 highway from Kassel to Eisenach goes through Creuzburg.

== Famous residents ==
- Ludwig IV of Thuringia (1200–1227), Count of Thuringia
- St. Elisabeth of Hungary (1207–1231), wife of Ludwig IV
- Hermann II, Landgrave of Thuringia (1222–1241)
- Sophie (1224–1275), married 1240 with Henry II Duke of Brabant
- Johannes Rothe (1360–1434), a major Thuringian chronicler
- Michael Praetorius (1571–1621), composer, organist and music theorist
- William Knabe (1803-1864), piano builder

== Honorary citizen ==
- Monika Harms (born 1946), general attorney, appointed on 5 February 2010 as honorary citizen for her services to the reorganization of the Liboriuskapelle

== Other people related to Creuzburg ==
Personalities who have spent part of their lives in Creuzburg, or have died in Creuzburg

- Bonifatius (672/673-754), Benedictine monk, first missionary in the Creuzburg region
- Johann Philip Bachmann (1762–1837)
- Harry Domela, (1904/1905-died after 1977), alias Baron Korff , incognito-traveling Prince Wilhelm of Prussia , adventurer and impostor, was in the summer of 1926 several weeks of the town's honor and was courted on the Creuzburg.
- Alexander Rödiger (born 1985), bobsleigh from Scherbda, silver medalists at the Olympic Winter Games 2010.

== Literature ==
- Rainer Schill, Astrid Thiel: Creuzburg an der Werra: Bilder aus vergangenen Tagen. Geiger-Verlag, ISBN 3-89264-743-7
- Rat der Stadt Creuzburg (Hg.): Creuzburg. 775 Jahre Stadt Creuzburg. 1213-1988. Aus der Geschichte der Stadt. Druckerei Fortschritt Erfurt, 1988.
- Horst Schmidt, Hans-Henning Walter: Creuzburg - Geschichte des Creuzburger Salzwerks. Eisenacher Schriften zur Heimatkunde 39. Eisenach, 1988.
