= Ludmilla of Bohemia =

Duchess consort of Bavaria (died 1240)

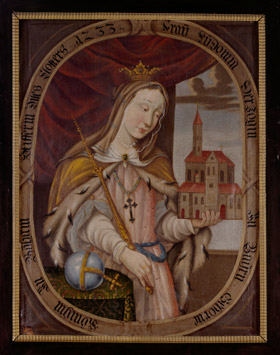

Duchess consort of Bavaria
- Tenure: 1204 – 1231
- Born: c. 1170; Bohemia
- Died: 14 August 1240; Seligenthal convent, Landshut
- Burial: Seligenthal convent, Landshut
- Spouse: Adalbert VI, Count of Bogen; Louis I, Duke of Bavaria
- Issue: Berthold IV, Count of Bogen; Albert IV, Count of Bogen; Diepold of Bogen; Otto II Wittelsbach, Duke of Bavaria
- Dynasty: Přemyslid
- Father: Frederick, Duke of Bohemia
- Mother: Elisabeth of Hungary

Ludmilla (Ludmiła) of Bohemia (died 14 August 1240) was the daughter of Frederick, Duke of Bohemia, and Elizabeth of Hungary. She was a member of the Přemyslid dynasty. She was Duchess consort of Bavaria by her marriage to Louis I, Duke of Bavaria.

== Family ==
Ludmilla was the third of six children born to her parents. Her siblings were Helena of Bohemia, betrothed to Manuel I Komnenos but never married, and Sophia of Bohemia, wife of Albert, Margrave of Meissen. The rest of Ludmilla's siblings were short-lived or died in early adulthood.

Ludmilla's paternal grandparents were Vladislaus II of Bohemia and his first wife Gertrude of Babenberg. Her maternal grandparents were Géza II of Hungary and Euphrosyne of Kiev.

Geza was the son of Béla II of Hungary and Helena of Raška.

Bela was the son of Prince Álmos and Predslava of Kiev, who was the daughter of Sviatopolk II of Kiev and an unknown Bohemian princess.

== Marriages ==
Ludmilla married twice and had issue in both of her marriages. Her first marriage was to Count Albert III of Bogen, making Ludmilla Countess of Bogen. The couple had three children from their marriage, all sons:

- Berthold IV, Count of Bogen (d. 1218) married Kunigunda of Hirschberg, no known issue.
- Albert IV, Count of Bogen (d. 1242) married Richeza of Dillingen.
- Diepold of Bogen (d. 1219) a priest in Regensburg.

Albert died in 1197 and was succeeded by his eldest son, Berthold.

Ludmilla then married Louis I, Duke of Bavaria, (also known as Ludwig) a former enemy of her first husband. The marriage was good for Louis because it created an alliance with Ludmilla's uncle, Ottokar I of Bohemia. The couple had one son:

- Otto II Wittelsbach, Duke of Bavaria (7 April 1206 – 29 November 1253), next Duke of Bavaria.

Louis and Ludmilla tried to find a suitable bride for their only child. Otto married Agnes of the Palatinate in 1222. Within time, Agnes' closer relatives died and she became Countess of Palatinate, which became part of the Bavarian inheritance, starting with Ludmilla's grandson, Louis II, Duke of Bavaria.

== Widowhood ==
Louis was murdered in 1231 on a bridge in Kelheim. The crime was never cleared up since the murderer was immediately lynched. Due to the following aversion of the Wittelsbach family the city of Kelheim lost its status as one of the ducal residences. Louis was buried in the crypt of Scheyern Abbey.

Ludmilla lived to see the birth of four or five grandchildren from Otto and Agnes: Louis II, Henry XIII, Duke of Bavaria, Elisabeth of Bavaria, Queen of Germany, Sophie and Agnes.

Ludmilla founded the Seligenthal convent on the land of the hospital of the Holy Ghost near Landshut, Niederbayern, in 1232, as an independent foundation. It was the first female Cistercian order in Bavaria and the convent and church were completed by 1259. She remained here for the rest of her days. Ludmilla died there on 14 August 1240 and her body was buried there.

== Ancestors ==
Ancestors of Ludmilla of Bohemia

16. Vratislaus II of Bohemia
8. Vladislaus I, Duke of Bohemia
17. Świętosława of Poland
4. Vladislaus II of Bohemia
18. Henry I of Berg-Schelklingen
9. Richeza of Berg
19. Adelheid of Mochental
2. Frederick, Duke of Bohemia
20. Leopold II, Margrave of Austria
10. Leopold III, Margrave of Austria
21. Ida of Formbach-Ratelnberg
5. Gertrude of Babenberg
22. Henry IV, Holy Roman Emperor
11. Agnes of Germany
23. Bertha of Savoy
1. Ludmilla of Bohemia
24. Álmos of Hungary
12. Béla II of Hungary
25. Predslava of Kiev
6. Géza II of Hungary
26. Uroš I of Rascia
13. Helena of Raška
27. Anna Diogenissa
3. Elisabeth of Hungary
28. Vladimir II Monomakh
14. Mstislav I of Kiev
29. Gytha of Wessex
7. Euphrosyne of Kiev
30. Dmitry Zavidich
15. Liubava Dmitrievna

Preceded by Agnes of Loon	Duchess of Bavaria; 1204–1231	Succeeded by Agnes of the Palatinate
