= Gertrude of Aldenberg =

German noblewoman and abbess

Blessed Gertrude of Aldenberg O.Praem.
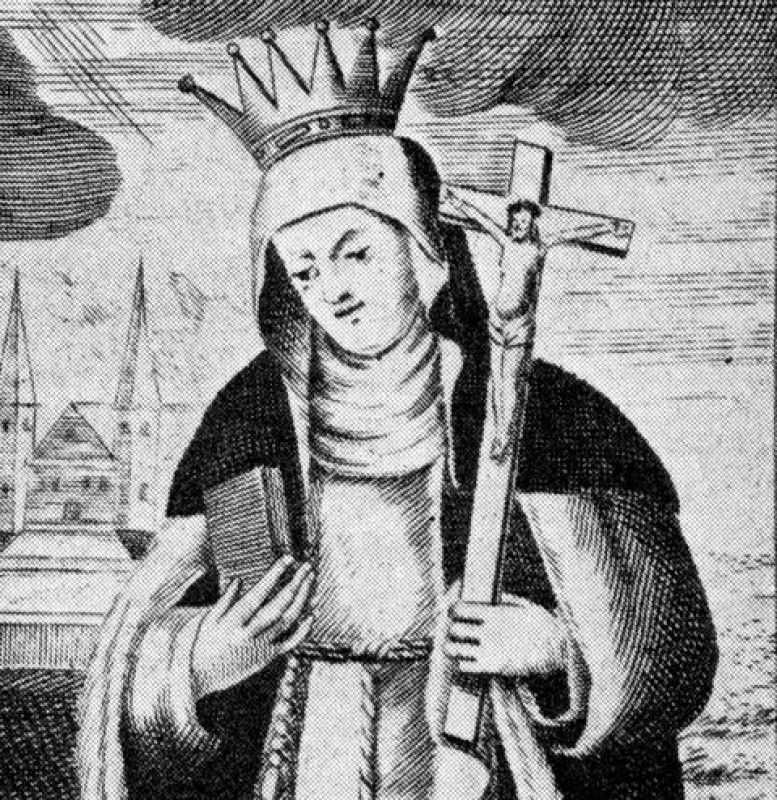
- Gertrude of Aldenberg
- Born: October 1227
- Died: 13 August 1297
- Venerated in: Roman Catholic Church
- Feast: 13 August

Gertrude of Aldenberg (c. October 1227 – 13 August 1297) was a German noblewoman and abbess. She was the daughter of Elizabeth of Hungary and of Louis IV, Landgrave of Thuringia. She became a Premonstratensian canoness regular at the Abbey of Aldenberg, near Wetzlar, in the Diocese of Trier, where she spent much of her life leading the community as its abbess. She was beatified in 1728, her feast is August 13.

== Life ==
Gertrude was the youngest of Louis IV and Elizabeth's three children. Her father died while on his way to the Holy Land, shortly before she was born. Gertrude was scarcely two years old when her mother left her in the care of the canonesses of the Abbey of Aldenberg, where she later entered the community. In 1248, only 21 years old, she was elected abbess and ruled over the monastery for the next 49 years.

With an inheritance she received from her uncle, Dietrich I, Margrave of Meissen, Gertrude erected a church and a poorhouse attached to the abbey. She took personal care of the residents there. She also led a life of extreme mortification. When Pope Nicholas IV published a crusade against the Saracens, Gertrude and her community took the Crusaders' cross and undertook to support the effort by prayer and acts of sacrifice.

In 1270, under Gertrude's direction, the abbey began to celebrate the Feast of Corpus Christi, being one of the first to introduce this feast into Germany. Pope Clement VI permitted the abbey to celebrate her feast day and granted indulgences to those who venerated her relics.
