= Louis I, Duke of Bavaria =

Bavarian nobleman (1173–1231)

Louis I

Duke of Bavaria
- Reign: 1183–1231
- Predecessor: Otto I
- Successor: Otto II

Count Palatine of the Rhine
- Reign: 1214–1231
- Predecessor: Henry VI
- Successor: Otto II
- Born: 23 December 1173; Kelheim
- Died: 15 September 1231 (aged 57); Kelheim
- Spouse: Ludmilla of Bohemia
- Issue: Otto II, Duke of Bavaria
- House: Wittelsbach
- Father: Otto I, Duke of Bavaria
- Mother: Agnes of Loon

Louis I, or Ludwig I (23 December 1173 – 15 September 1231), called the Kelheimer or of Kelheim, since he was born and died at Kelheim, was the Duke of Bavaria from 1183 and Count Palatine of the Rhine from 1214. He was the only surviving son of Otto I, Duke of Bavaria (the first duke from the House of Wittelsbach) by his wife Agnes of Loon. He married Ludmilla of Bohemia, a daughter of Duke Frederick of Bohemia.

== Life ==
=== Early years ===
Soon after his father's death in 1183, Louis was appointed under the guardianship of his uncle Conrad of Wittelsbach, Archbishop of Mainz, and Emperor Frederick Barbarossa. His mother, Agnes, an energetic and enterprising leader, had taken over the regency of Bavaria in the meantime, securing her son's inheritance. Upon his coming-of-age, in 1189, at sixteen years old, at the beginning of his reign, he had already fallen in the midst of a conflict which triggered the nearly simultaneous extinction of the Burgrave of Regensburg and the Count of Sulzbach in the years 1188 and 1189. This allowed Barbarossa to expand his royal domains within the Empire to include Regensburg and Sulzbach at Louis's expense. When the Emperor died on Crusade, and his son, Henry VI had ascended the throne on 15 April 1191 in Rome, he had immediately found a princely opposition in Ottokar I of Bohemia and his brother-in-law Count Albert III of Bogen who demanded a revision of the Staufen imperial land policy. Using that justification, Albert had designs to seize the Sulzbach domains from Emperor Henry's royal territory. Louis immediately attempted to mediate and called for a Hoftag in Laufen, which caught the attention of many great men within the Empire, to settle the dispute. Yet he could not stop the Count of Bogen and the Sulzbach land was taken. When Duke Louis turned against that, it came to war. Louis's forces were pushed back by the combined might of Count Albert and Duke Ottokar. Even the vicious counter-attack of Leopold V, Duke of Austria and Berthold, Duke of Merania were not able to change the situation. Louis had vowed to never stop until Count Albert was without Sulzbach.

It was in the summer of 1192 at Worms where he received the German tradition of knighting, which was the handing of sword and belt, in the presence of Emperor Henry VI and many other Princes. By 1193, Emperor Henry became involved in-person over the affair and seized Sulzbach and Albert declared a standstill of arms; Albert was to be banished and Ottokar of Bohemia deprived of his duchy. In exchange for this service, Louis was to remain, for the next decade and a half, on the side of the Staufen. Louis would demonstrate his partisanship at the Hoftag at Würzburg, Mainz and his attendance of the Imperial retinue to Apulia and Sicily, where he would stand with the Emperor on securing Emperor Henry's inheritance of southern Italy.

Until the death of the emperor, Louis remained a loyal supporter of Henry VI and accompanied the Hohenstaufen in 1194 also to Italy on his second expedition for the conquest of the kingdom of Sicily, which was entitled Henry's wife Constance as sole heir. In the struggle for the throne after the death of Henry VI, he remained one of the main supporters of the Hohenstaufen Philip of Swabia. His continued support, however, had a price. When the Landgrave of Stefling died without an heir in 1196, instead of including the region over to his royal domain, Henry enfeoffed it to Louis instead. Suddenly, Eberhard, Archbishop of Salzburg and Conrad, Bishop of Regensburg, falling at variance, declared war on Duke Louis and spared neither sacred nor profane structures. It was only through Louis's character that peace was restored.

The following year, in 1197, Louis went with the Emperor to Sicily to prepare for their departure for the German Crusade of 1197. But Henry had died of an illness; possibly malaria, suddenly, and the journey was canceled. Henry's death thus began a most difficult epoch in German history.

=== Rise to power ===
The northern and western German princes demanded a new emperor, choosing Otto of Brunswick, mainly under the encouragement of Pope Celestine III, while the southern and eastern German princes remained loyal to the Hohenstaufen. While it was true that Emperor Henry was still alive when his young son Frederick II was elected king at two years of age, he had no way of knowing that his son would become challenged by such a force. The only force that could counter the north and west German's choice was Henry's brother Philip who had initially considered being regent, but was refused that right as the south and east Germans needed an acting king; and Frederick II was too young. Because of all that, it resulted in a double-election in 1198. That same year, Louis's old nemesis, Albert III of Bogen, had died. Thus leaving him with one less problem and one great opportunity.

Louis married the widowed Ludmilla of Bohemia in 1204 to gain the alliance of her uncle King Ottokar I of Bohemia. This also gave him claim to the lands of Albert III of Bogen (brother-in-law of King Ottokar I), if at least not directly. That same year, the Margraviate of Vohburg passed to Louis as well.

An old story goes that the Duke made the acquaintance of Ludmilla of Bohemia with affection and she fearing he did it to delude her, hid three persons she trusted behind a curtain and gave them three pictures to hold up. This done, she begged of him to see her no more unless he promised to marry her before witnesses. The Duke hesitated and she pointed to the three pictures saying,"Those said persons should be witnesses to your promises." Louis, thinking those persons could never rise in judgement against him, made her all the protestations she could desire, so she drew back the curtains and revealed the three living witnesses. He was so taken with the contrivance that he solemnly married her afterwards.

The margraves of Cham died without heirs in 1204 which resulted in major areas given to Louis by King Philip; however, the March of the Nordgau was left as an imperial fief. With this new wealth of land, Louis founded Landshut and began the building of Trausnitz Castle there that same year. The castle was completed by the time of Emperor Frederick II's visit later in 1235.

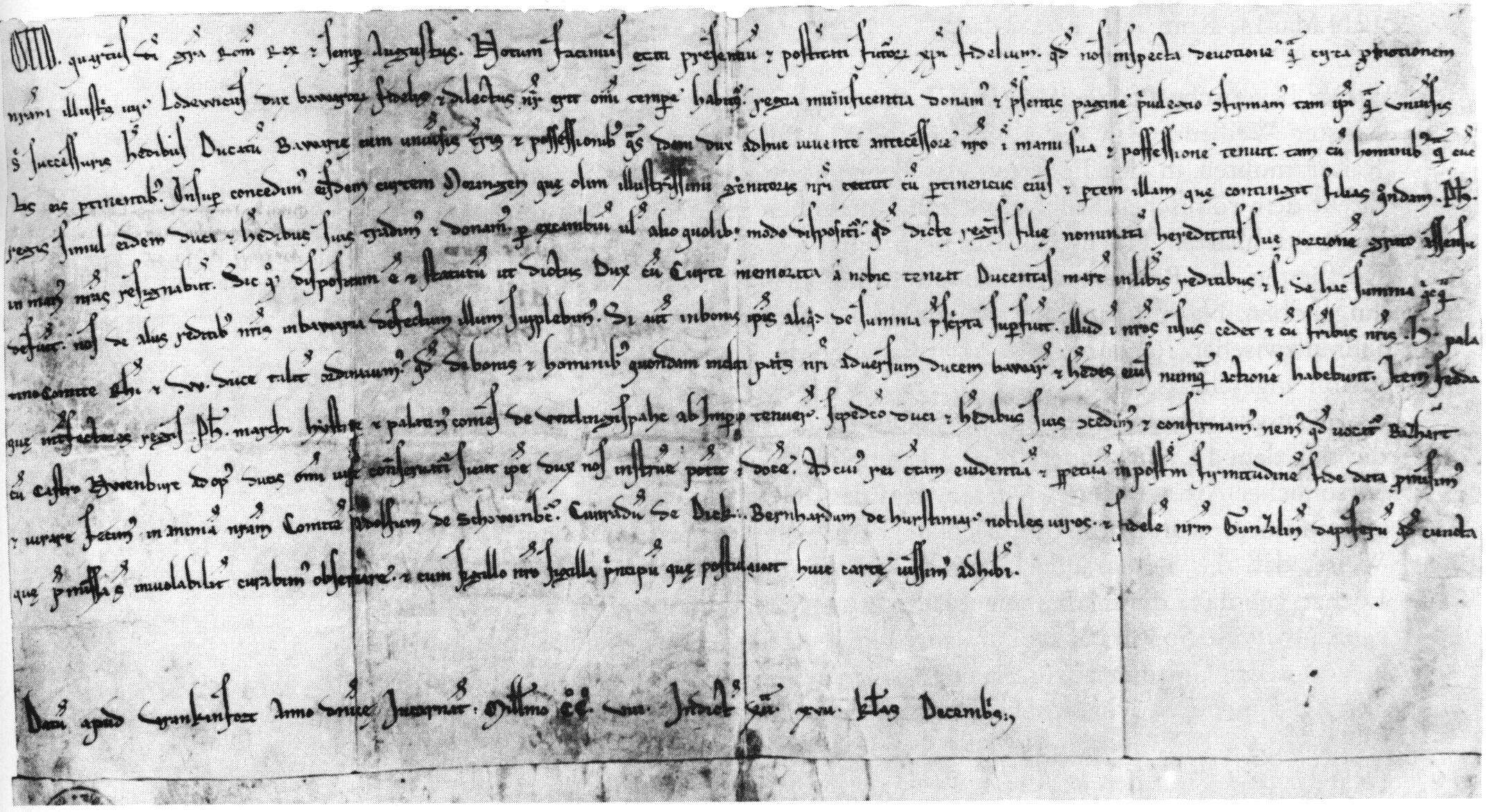
Otto IV's charter enfeoffing Louis with Bavaria on 15 November 1208

By the month of June 1208, the many lords of the Empire were gathering with King Philip at Bamberg, the seat of the Prince-Bishopric of Bamberg, to celebrate the wedding of his niece, Beatrice II, Countess of Burgundy, with Otto I, Duke of Merania. The ceremony was headed by Ekbert, Bishop of Bamberg of the House of Andechs (brother of the groom Otto) and Henry II, Margrave of Istria who also was in attendance. After the ceremony, King Philip retired to his quarters, where there, on 21 June 1208, he was murdered by Otto VIII, Count Palatine of Bavaria, Louis's first cousin. The killer evaded the king's guards and fled the city. The lords were immediately called for a court assembly, and they blamed the house of Andechs for the murder of the King. Whether they had a hand in it directly is under debate, but that it happened under their watch is not; they were at least guilty of connivance, with Louis suspecting Henry II of Istria the most. All Andechs were banned from their lands, minus Otto I of Merania and Beatrice his bride who were both regarded as blameless. Thus, an old ally of Bavaria became an enemy overnight. Louis left Bamberg immediately, roused his army, and seized the March of Istria.

After King Philip's murder, Louis did not immediately support the Welf King Otto IV, but rather ran a new king's election in Bavaria under his influence in which he would decide whom he would support. Ultimately, like many others, to secure his accomplishments - and those of his family - he made deals with King Otto IV which granted him the imperial fiefs of the Andechs, assured succession of the Palatinate of the Rhine towards him, and confirmed the everlasting reign of the Wittelsbach family in Bavaria.

Nonetheless, in 1211, Louis joined the Hohenstaufen party again; King Frederick II rewarded him with the Palatinate of the Rhine in 1214: Louis's son Otto II was married to Agnes of the Palatinate, a granddaughter of Duke Henry the Lion and Conrad of Hohenstaufen. With this marriage, the Wittelsbach inherited the Palatinate and ultimately kept it as a Wittelsbach possession until 1918. Since that time also, the lion has become a heraldic symbol in the coat of arms for Bavaria and the Palatinate.

=== Crusade ===
On 23 July 1215, Louis was at Aachen, to oversee the re-crowning of Frederick II as King of the Romans. While there, both Louis and Frederick took crusader vows.

He founded the city of Straubing in 1218.

The Emperor had given Louis 2000 marks of silver for his crusade.

In May 1221, Louis sailed on with his Bavarian army with Ulrich II, Bishop of Passau, Herman V, Margrave of Baden-Baden, John of Brienne and many other nobles. As soon as their fleet had arrived at Damietta, a council was held with Pelagio Galvani, the papal legate, in the city. Louis had urged (despite having orders not to begin offensive operations until the Emperor arrived) they assemble their armies and strike at the sultan's camp, before the river should take up its usual increase. A plan was formed and tents were set up just up the river on 29 June. On 6 July, the Legate had ordered a three-day fast and carrying the banner of Christ barefoot, planted it where the river rises. That next day, King John had come with a numerous army to bring further assistance to their cause. Then on 17 July they gathered at the village of Fariskur, where they were met by the enemy. In the battle of Fariskur, they repelled the enemy so well, no losses came to the crusader side. The legate had been generous in wages to the knights and their attendants, armed ships sparing neither body nor wealth to finish the task, along with the help of Duke Louis, King John, the bishops, archbishops and the grand masters of the orders.

On 19 July the Saracens had sent a large cavalry force against the Crusaders. The Muslims had surrounded the Christians and shot arrows at them, avoiding close combat. The Crusaders responded in kind and the Muslims withdrew. But the next day, on 20 July, the enemy had attacked fiercer than ever, only to injure and kill very few Crusaders in number. By 21 July, the Muslims retreated yet again. But in doing so, they burned many of their villages in the process, to prevent the Crusaders from gaining those footholds and their resources. This failed, as the Crusaders still managed to find food in many of the deserted villages. This granted the Crusaders a peaceful pass through Saramsah, which the Sultan had destroyed.

After the disaster of the battle of Mansurah in 26 - 28 August 1221, he was given as a hostage in Egypt to Al-Kamil, but was later released after Emperor Frederick's ambassadors negotiated for an eight year truce, the return of Damietta and the release of all prisoners.

=== Final years ===
He founded the city of Landau an der Isar in 1224.

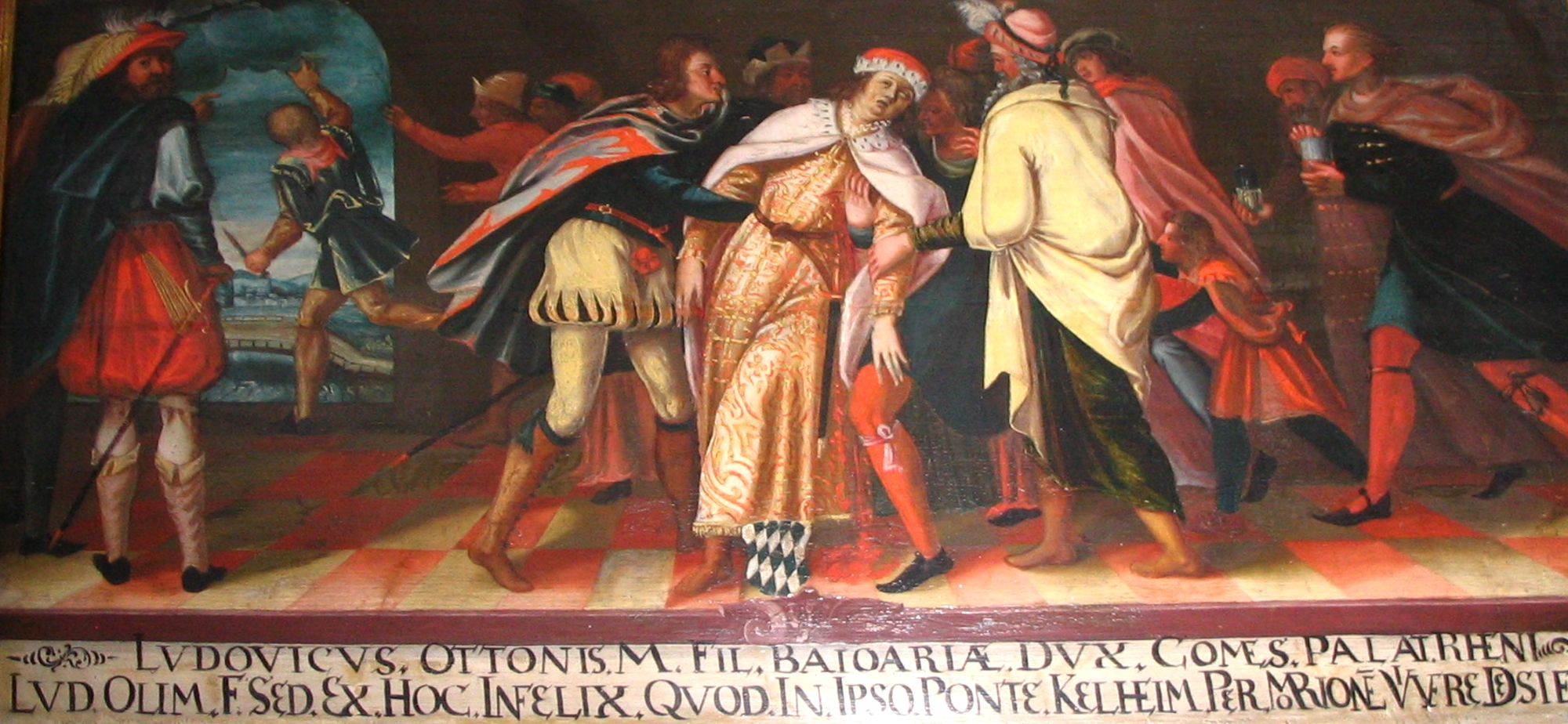
Painting of Louis's assassination in Scheyern Abbey

In 1225 Louis took over the guardianship for the young king Henry. Subsequently, however, Louis's relationship with both his ward and the emperor deteriorated. With the latter, there were differences in matters of church policy, during the conflict with Henry in 1229 he even fought with military means, but the Bavarian duke was defeated. He intrigued with the Pope against the Staufer during the War of the Keys in Italy. Under pressure, he moved back to Kelheim Castle in 1230.

Louis was murdered in 1231 on a bridge in Kelheim. The crime was never cleared up since the murderer - reportedly an Assassin - was immediately lynched, though many suspected Emperor Frederick II to be behind the deed. Afterwards the city of Kelheim lost the favour of the Wittelsbach family and its status as a ducal residence. Louis's son and successor, Otto the Illustrious, had the bridge broken down in the following year and changed its gate to a chapel. Louis was buried in the crypt of Scheyern Abbey.

== Issue ==
In October 1204 Louis married Ludmilla of Bohemia, a daughter of Frederick, Duke of Bohemia and his wife, Elizabeth of Hungary, and the widow of Count Albert III of Bogen. Ludmilla and Louis had one son:

- Otto II, Duke of Bavaria (7 April 1206 – 29 November 1253).

== Bibliography ==
- Lyon, Jonathan R. (2013). Princely Brothers and Sisters: The Sibling Bond in German Politics, 1100-1250. Cornell University Press. p. 248.
- Holzfurtner, Ludwig (2005). Die Wittelsbacher: Staat und Dynastie in acht Jahrhunderten (Urban-Taschenbucher). Kohlhammer. ISBN 978-3170181915.
- Hubensteiner, Benno (2013). Bayerische Geschichte. Munich: Rosenheimer Verlagshaus. ISBN 978-3475537561.
- Stevens, John (1706). The History of Bavaria: From the First Ages, to This Present Year. Printed for S. Ballard ... and Cha. Smith ...
- Peltzer, Jörg (2013). Die Wittelsbacher und die Kurpfalz im Mittelalter: Eine Erfolgsgeschichte?. Schnell & Steiner. ISBN 978-3795426453.
- Powell, James M. (1986). Anatomy of a Crusade 1213-1221. Philadelphia: University of Pennsylvania Press. ISBN 0-8122-1323-8.
- Reiss-Engelhorn-Museen, Mannheim (2013). Die Wittelsbacher am Rhein. Die Kurpfalz und Europa: 2 Bände. Schnell & Steiner. ISBN 978-3795426446.
- Schmid, Gregor M. (2014). Die Familie, die Bayern erfand: Das Haus Wittelsbach: Geschichten, Traditionen, Schicksale, Skandale. Munich: Stiebner. ISBN 978-3830710608.
- Vogel, Susanne (2012). Die Wittelsbacher: Herzöge - Kurfürsten - Könige in Bayern von 1180 bis 1918. Biografische Skizzen. Staackmann. ISBN 978-3886752485.

Louis I, Duke of Bavaria House of Wittelsbach Born: 1173 Died: 1231
Regnal titles
Preceded by Otto I	Duke of Bavaria; 1183–1231	Succeeded by Otto II
Preceded by Henry VI	Count Palatine of the Rhine; 1214–1231	Succeeded by Otto II
Preceded by Henry of Kalden	Marshal of the Holy Roman Empire; 1214-1221	Succeeded by Louis IV, Landgrave of Thuringia
