= Elizabeth of Hungary, Duchess of Bohemia =

Duchess consort of Bohemia (c. 1149–1189)

Elizabeth of Hungary
- Duchess consort of Bohemia
- Born: c. 1149
- Died: 1189 (aged 43–44)
- Spouse: Frederick, Duke of Bohemia
- Issue: Helena of Bohemia; Sophia, Margravine of Meissen; Ludmilla, Countess of Bogen, Duchess of Bavaria; Vratislaus of Bohemia; Olga of Bohemia; Margaret of Bohemia
- House: Árpád
- Father: Géza II of Hungary
- Mother: Euphrosyne of Kiev

Elizabeth of Hungary (c. 1149 – 1189), was a Duchess consort of Bohemia, married to Frederick, Duke of Bohemia. Her parents were King Géza II of Hungary and Euphrosyne of Kiev. She served as regent of Bohemia twice in the absence of her spouse.

== Biography ==
Elizabeth married Frederick in about the year of 1157.

In 1179, Elizabeth served as regent during the absence of her spouse and as such successfully conducted the defense of Prague toward her brother-in-law Sobeslav II. She appeared herself on the battlefield with clerical insignia on her banner.

In 1184, she repeated the very same fight toward the very same opponent and was again victorious. In 1189, however, she was forced to surrender to Conrad II.

== Issue ==
- Helena of Bohemia (b. 1158); engaged to Peter, son of Manuel I Komnenos, in 1164.
- Sophia of Bohemia (d. 25 May 1185); married Albert I, Margrave of Meissen.
- Ludmilla of Bohemia (d. 14 August 1240); married, firstly, Adalbert VI, Count of Bogen and had issue; married, secondly, Louis I, Duke of Bavaria and had issue.
- Vratislaus of Bohemia (d. 1180)
- Olga of Bohemia (fl. c. 1163)
- Margaret of Bohemia (d. 28 August 1167)

Elizabeth of Hungary, Duchess of Bohemia House of Árpád
Royal titles
Preceded by Judith of Thuringia	Duchess consort of Bohemia; 1172–1173	Succeeded by Elizabeth of Greater Poland
Preceded by Elizabeth of Greater Poland	Duchess consort of Bohemia; 1178–1189	Succeeded by Hellicha of Wittelsbach
