= Sophia of Wittelsbach =

German noblewoman (1170–1238)

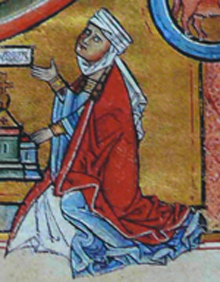
- Picture of Sophia in the Elisabeth psalter
- Born: 1170
- Died: 1238 (aged 67–68)
- Noble family: House of Wittelsbach
- Spouse: Hermann I, Landgrave of Thuringia
- Issue: Louis IV; Conrad; Henry Raspe
- Father: Otto I Wittelsbach, Duke of Bavaria
- Mother: Agnes of Loon

Sophia of Wittelsbach (1170–1238) was a daughter of Otto I Wittelsbach (Count Palatine and later Duke of Bavaria) and his wife Agnes of Loon.

In 1196, Sophia married Landgrave Hermann I of Thuringia; she was his second wife. They had the following children:

- Irmgard (b. 1197), married in 1211 to Count Henry I of Anhalt
- Louis IV (1200–1227)
- Herman (1202–1216)
- Conrad (1204–1247), grand master of the Teutonic Knights
- Henry Raspe (1204–1247)
- Agnes, married twice:
  1. in 1225 to Henry "the Profane" of Babenberg (1208–1228), a son of Margrave Leopold VI of Austria
  2. in 1229 to Duke Albert I of Saxony (c. 1175 – 1261)
