= Hermann II of Thuringia =

Landgrave of Thuringia

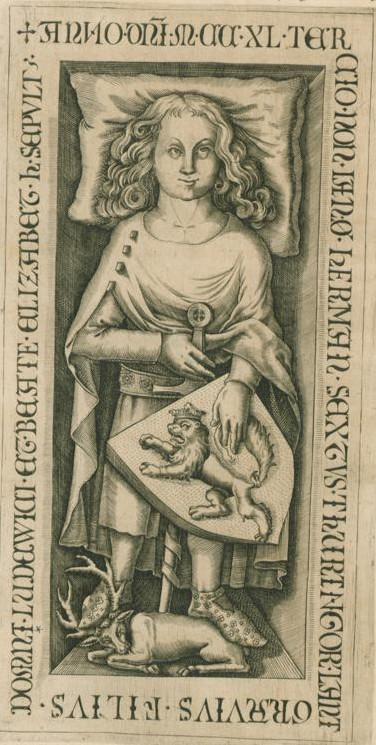

Hermann II (28 March 1222 in Creuzburg – 3 January 1241) was the Landgrave of Thuringia and the son of Louis IV, Landgrave of Thuringia, and Saint Elizabeth of Hungary.

== Life ==
With Louis's death in 1227, his brother Henry Raspe assumed the regency due to the minority of four-year-old Hermann. Henry managed to officially succeed his brother after the death of Elizabeth in 1231. Hermann never reigned and died ten years later; some historians have accused Henry of poisoning the youth. He was married to Helen, daughter of Otto I, Duke of Brunswick-Lüneburg.

== Bibliography ==
- Klaniczay, Gábor (2002). Holy Rulers and Blessed Princesses: Dynastic Cults in Medieval Central Europe. Translated by Palmai, Eva. Cambridge University Press.
- Mägdefrau, Werner (2010). Thüringen im Mittelalter 1130-1310 Von den Ludowingern zu den Wettinern. Jena: Rockstuhl. ISBN 978-3-86777-152-8.
- Warsitzka, Wilfried (2002). Die Thüringer Landgrafen. Dr. Bussert & Stadeler. ISBN 978-3932906220.
- Knochenhauer, Theodor (1871). Geschichte Thüringens Zur Zeit Des Ersten Landgrafenhauses (1039–1247). Gotha.
- Galletti, Johann Georg A. (1784). Geschichte Thüringens.

Hermann II of Thuringia Ludowinger Born: 28 March 1222 Died: 3 January 1241
Preceded by Louis IV	Landgrave of Thuringia; 1227–1241	Succeeded by Henry Raspe
