= Géza II of Hungary =

King of Hungary and Croatia from 1141 to 1162

Géza II
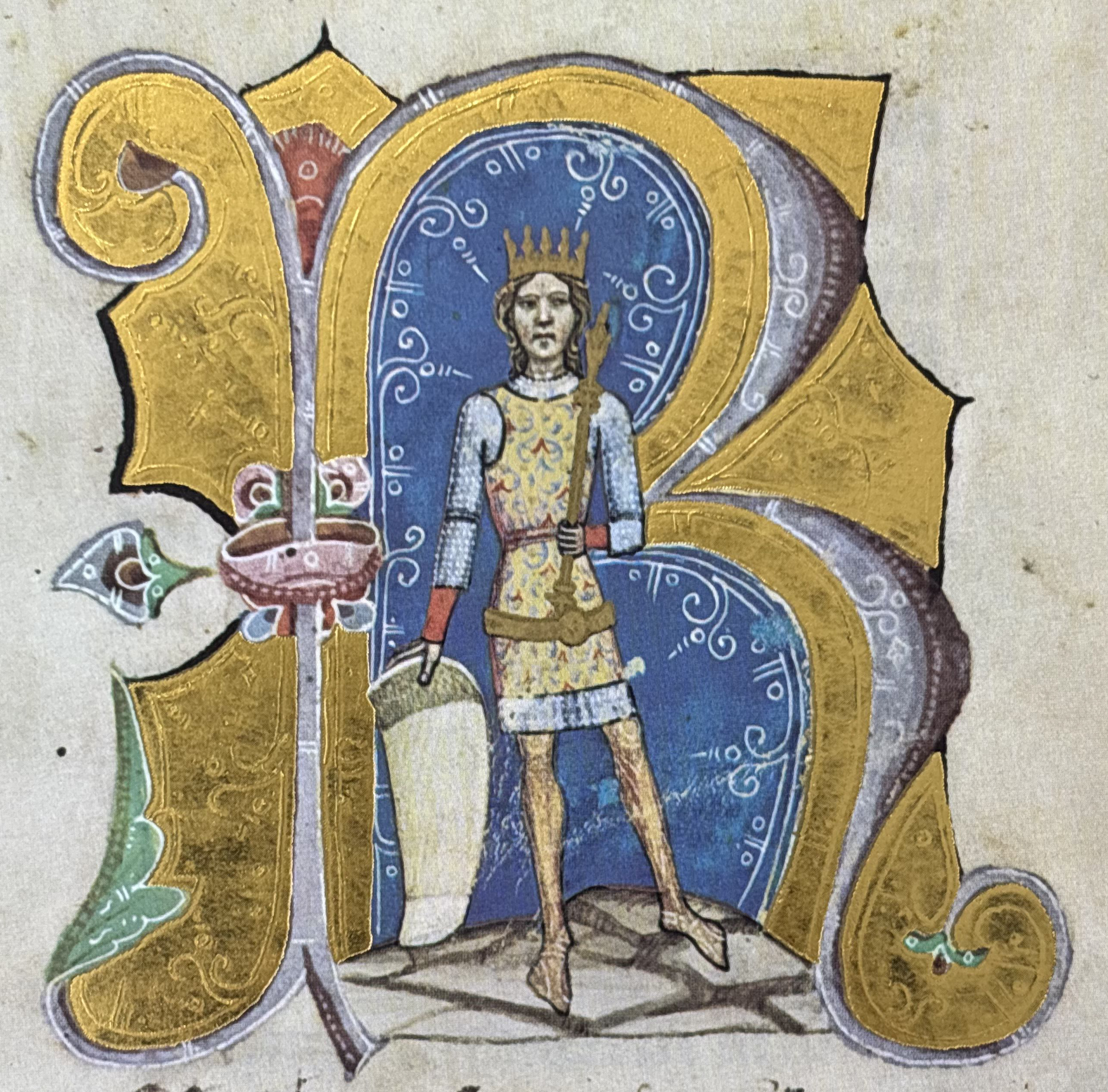
- The young Géza (from the Illuminated Chronicle)

King of Hungary and Croatia
- Reign: 13 February 1141 – 31 May 1162
- Coronation: 16 February 1141
- Predecessor: Béla II
- Successor: Stephen III
- Regents: Helena and Beloš of Serbia (1141–1147)
- Born: 1130; Tolna, Kingdom of Hungary
- Died: 31 May 1162 (aged 31–32); Székesfehérvár, Kingdom of Hungary
- Burial: Székesfehérvár Basilica
- Spouse: Euphrosyne of Kiev
- Issue more...: Stephen III; Béla III; Elisabeth, Duchess of Bohemia; Géza; Helena, Duchess of Austria
- Dynasty: Árpád
- Father: Béla II of Hungary
- Mother: Helena of Serbia
- Religion: Roman Catholic

Géza II (Hungarian: II. Géza; Croatian: Gejza II.; Slovak: Gejza II.; 1130 – 31 May 1162) was King of Hungary and Croatia from 1141 to 1162. He was the oldest son of King Béla the Blind and his wife, Helena of Serbia. When his father died, Géza was still a child and he started ruling under the guardianship of his mother and her brother, Beloš. A pretender to the throne, Boris Kalamanos, who had already claimed Hungary during Béla the Blind's reign, temporarily captured Pressburg (now Bratislava in Slovakia) with the assistance of German mercenaries in early 1146. In retaliation, Géza who came of age in the same year, invaded Austria and routed Henry Jasomirgott, Margrave of Austria, in the Battle of the Fischa.

Although the German–Hungarian relations remained tense, no major confrontations occurred when the German crusaders marched through Hungary in June 1147. Two months later, Louis VII of France and his crusaders arrived, along with Boris Kalamanos who attempted to take advantage of the crusade to return to Hungary. Louis VII refused to extradite Boris to Géza, but prevented the pretender from contacting his supporters in Hungary and managed to shepherd him to Constantinople with the rest of the crusaders. Géza joined the coalition that Louis VII and Roger II of Sicily formed against Conrad III of Germany and Byzantine emperor Manuel I Komnenos.

Géza intervened at least six times in battles for control of Kiev on behalf of Iziaslav II either by sending reinforcements or by personally leading his troops to the Kievan Rus' between 1148 and 1155. He also waged war against the Byzantine Empire numerous times on behalf of his allies, including his cousins who ruled over Serbia, but could not prevent the Byzantines from restoring their suzerainty. Conflicts eventually emerged between Géza and his brothers, Stephen and Ladislaus, who both took flight from Hungary and settled in Emperor Manuel's court in Constantinople. Géza supported Frederick I between 1158 and 1160, against the Lombards by providing auxiliary troops. After the cardinals who supported Emperor Frederick I elected Victor IV as pope, Géza acknowledged his legitimacy in 1160, but within a year he had changed sides and concluded a concordat with Victor IV's opponent, Pope Alexander III. Before his death, Géza organized a separate appanage duchy for his younger son, Béla.

The ancestors of the Transylvanian Saxons came to Hungary during Géza's reign. Western European knights and Muslim warriors from the Pontic steppes also settled in Hungary during this period. Géza supposedly even allowed his Muslim soldiers to take concubines.

== Early years ==
Géza was born the eldest son of Béla the Blind, a cousin of King Stephen II of Hungary, and Helena of Serbia in 1130. Géza's father had been blinded, together with his rebellious father, Álmos, in the 1110s on the order of Stephen II's father, King Coloman, who wanted to ensure Stephen's succession. When Géza was born, his parents lived on an estate that King Stephen had granted them in Tolna. Géza's father succeeded King Stephen in the spring of 1131. In the same year, Queen Helena took Géza and his younger brother, Ladislaus, to an assembly held at Arad, where she ordered the massacre of sixty-eight noblemen "by whose counsel the King had been blinded", according to the Illuminated Chronicle.

== Reign ==
=== Minor king (1141–1146) ===
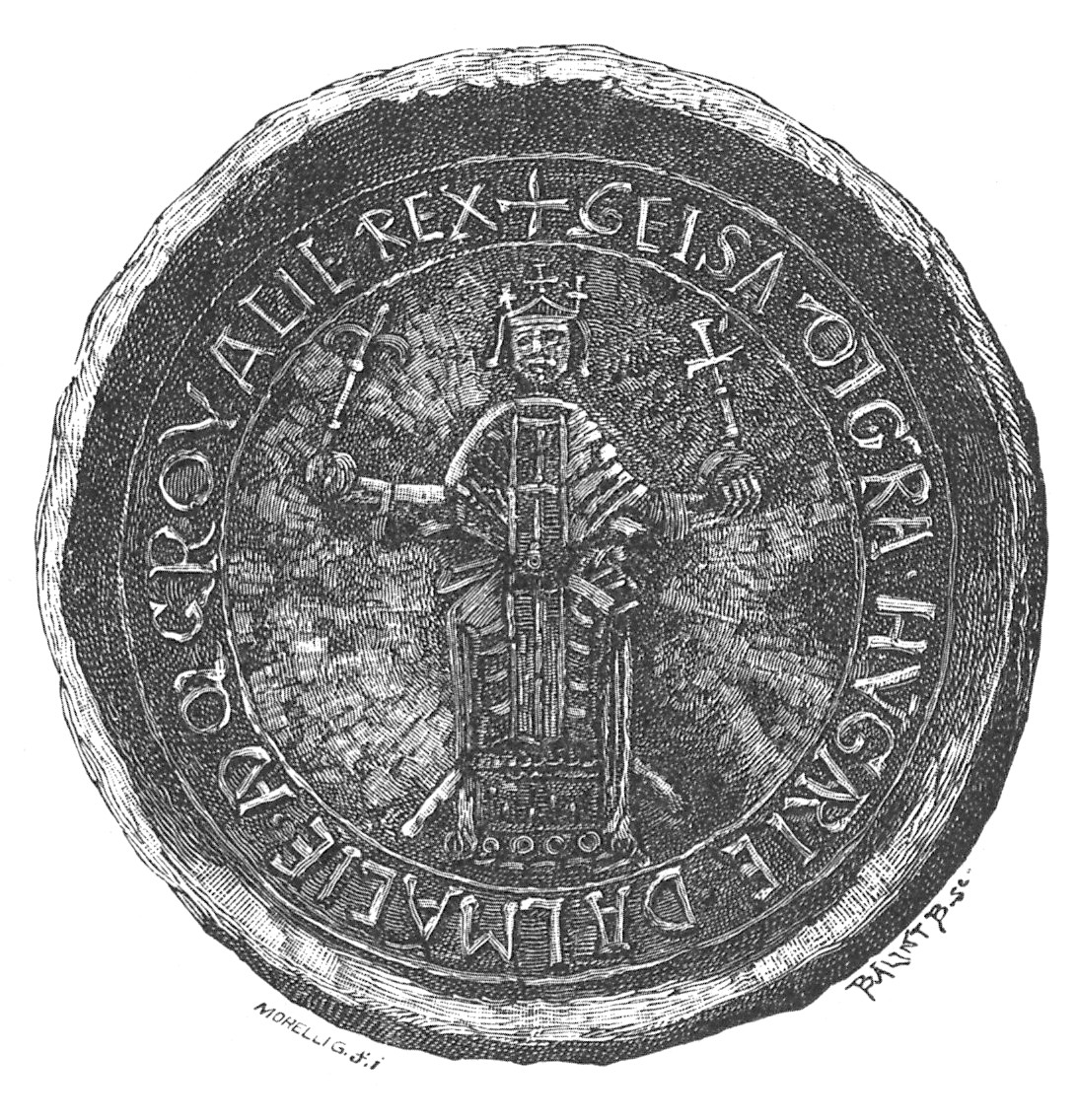
Géza's royal seal

King Béla died on 13 February 1141 and Géza succeeded him without opposition. The eleven-year-old Géza was crowned king on 16 February. His mother and her brother, Beloš, ruled as regents in the first years of his reign.

One of Géza's first charters, issued in 1141, confirmed the privileges of the citizens of Split in Dalmatia. In the charter, Géza is titled by "By the Grace of God, King of Hungary, Dalmatia, Croatia and Rama". According to historian Paul Stephenson, the towns of central Dalmatia—including Šibenik and Trogir—accepted Géza's suzerainty after a Hungarian invasion around 1142. Hungarian troops assisted Prince Volodimerko of Halych—who had been the ally of Géza's father against the pretender Boris—when Great Prince Vsevolod II of Kyiv invaded Halych in 1144. Although the Hungarian auxiliaries "were of no use whatsoever", according to the Hypatian Codex, the grand prince could not occupy Volodimerko's principality.

Boris was the son of Eufemia of Kiev, King Coloman of Hungary's second wife, whom the king expelled on the charge of adultery before Boris's birth. According to the chronicler Bishop Otto of Freising, Boris approached Conrad III of Germany to seek his assistance against Géza at the end of 1145. Upon the recommendation of Vladislav II of Bohemia, the German monarch authorized Boris to muster an army of mercenaries in Bavaria and Austria. Boris stormed Hungary and took the fortress of Pressburg (present-day Bratislava in Slovakia). The royal forces soon imposed a blockade on the fortress and convinced Boris's mercenaries to surrender without resistance in exchange for compensation.

The Hungarians blamed Conrad III for Boris's attack and decided to invade the Holy Roman Empire. Before crossing the river Lajta (now Leitha in Austria), which marked the western border of Hungary, the sixteen-year-old Géza was girded with a sword in a token of his coming of age. In the Battle of the Fischa on 11 September, the Hungarian army under the command of Géza and Beloš routed the German troops led by Henry Jasomirgott, Margrave of Austria.

=== Crusaders' march across Hungary (1146–1147) ===
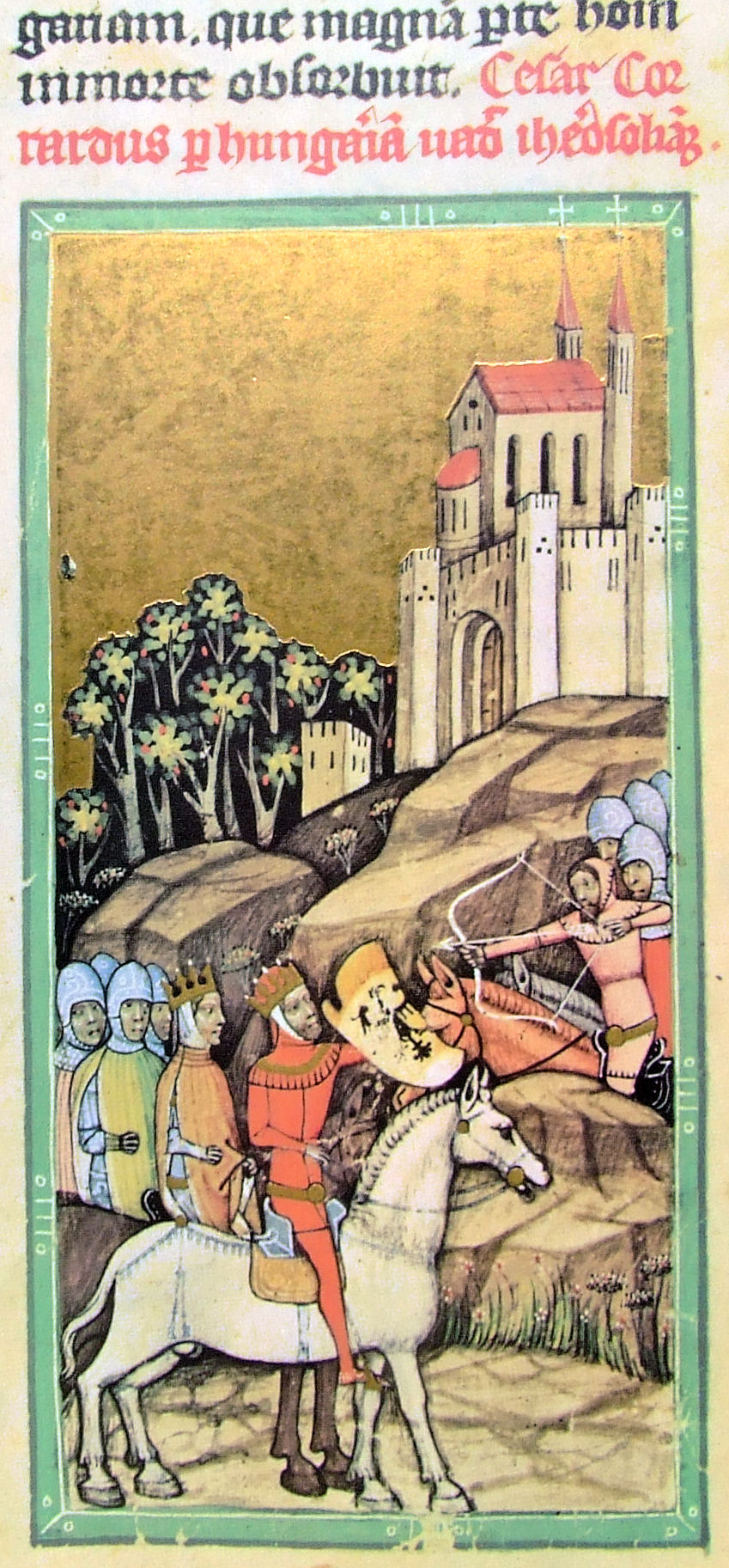
Conrad III of Germany and the German crusaders arrive in Hungary (from the Illuminated Chronicle)

Géza married Euphrosyne, sister of Grand Prince Iziaslav II of Kiev, in the second half of 1146. German–Hungarian relations remained tense as Boris attempted to take advantage of Conrad III's decision to lead a crusade to the Holy Land through Hungary. However Géza, who knew that "he could conquer more easily by gold than by force, poured out much money among the Germans and thus escaped an attack from them," according to the chronicler Odo of Deuil. The German crusaders marched across Hungary without major incident in June 1147.

The Illuminated Chronicle relates that some Hungarian noblemen promised Boris "if he could make his way into the kingdom, many would take him for their lord and, deserting the King, would cleave to him." Boris convinced two French noblemen to assist by hiding him among the French crusaders who followed the Germans towards the Holy Land. King Louis VII of France and his crusaders arrived in Hungary in August. Géza learnt that his opponent was with the French and demanded his extradition. Although Louis VII rejected this demand, he held Boris in custody and "took him out of Hungary," according to Odo of Deuil. Having left Hungary, Boris settled in the Byzantine Empire.

=== Active foreign policy (1147–1155) ===
Disputes among European powers led to the formation of two coalitions in the late 1140s. One alliance was formed by the Byzantine Emperor Manuel I Komnenos and Conrad III against Roger II of Sicily who had invaded Byzantine territories. Géza sided with Roger II and his allies, including the rebellious German prince, Welf VI and Uroš II of Serbia. Géza sent reinforcements to his brother-in-law, Grand Prince Iziaslav II, against Prince Vladimir of Chernigov in the spring of 1148. The Grand Principality of Serbia rebelled in 1149, forcing Emperor Manuel I to interrupt his preparations for an invasion of Southern Italy and invade Serbia in 1149. According to the emperor's panegyrist Theodore Prodromus, Hungarian forces supported the Serbs during the emperor's campaign. The Hypatian Codex says that Géza referred to his war against Emperor Manuel when excusing himself for refusing to send reinforcements to Iziaslav II whom Yuri Dolgorukiy, Prince of Suzdal, expelled from Kiev in August 1149. Hungarian auxiliaries supported Iziaslav II to reoccupy Kiev in the early spring of 1150, but before long Yuri Dolgorukiy expelled Iziaslav from the town. In autumn, Géza led his army against Volodimirko of Halych, who was Yuri Dolgorukiy's close ally. He captured Sanok, but Volodimirko bribed the Hungarian commanders, who persuaded Géza to leave Halych before November.

A "countless allied force of Hungarian cavalry as well as of the heterodox Chalisoi" had supported the Serbs in the same year, according to the contemporaneous John Kinnamos, but the Byzantine army routed their united troops on the river Tara in September. The Byzantine victory forced Uroš II of Serbia to acknowledge the emperor's suzerainty. Emperor Manuel launched a retaliatory campaign against Hungary and ravaged the lands between the rivers Sava and Danube. Assisted by Byzantine troops, the pretender Boris also broke into Hungary and devastated the valley of the river Temes. Géza, who had just returned from Halych, did not want to "involve the remaining Hungarian force in destruction" and sued for peace. The peace treaty was signed in late 1150 or early 1151.

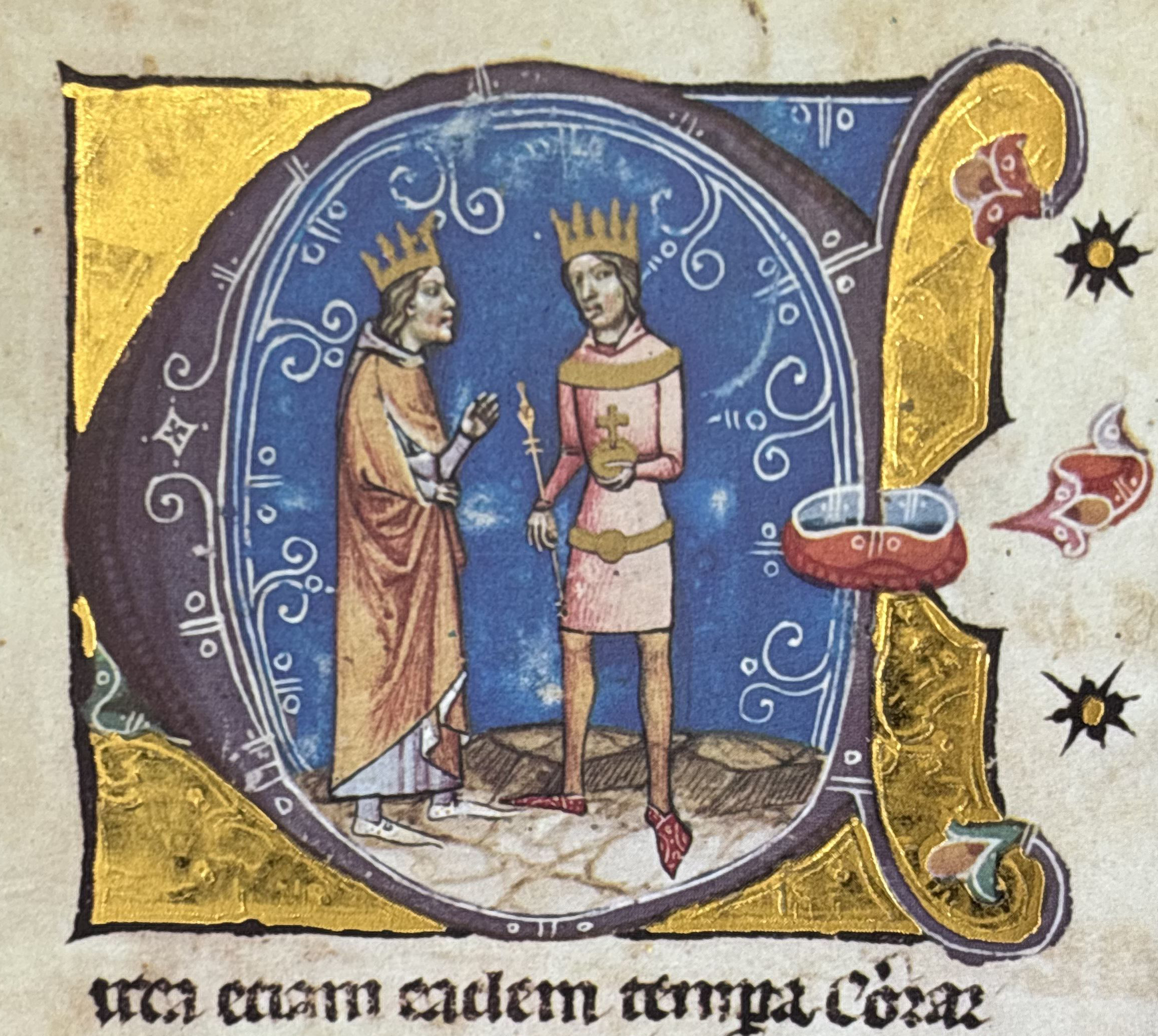
Géza meets King Louis VII of France during the Second Crusade (from the Illuminated Chronicle)

Géza met Henry Jasomirgott which contributed to the normalization of their strained relations in 1151. He sent reinforcements to Iziaslav II who again reoccupied Kiev before April 1151. Three months later, Volodimirko of Halych routed a Hungarian army that was marching towards Kiev. Frederick Barbarossa, the newly elected King of Germany, demanded the German princes' consent to wage war against Hungary at the Imperial Diet of June 1152, but the princes refused him "for certain obscure reasons", according to Otto of Freising. Géza invaded Halych in the summer of 1152. The united armies of Géza and Iziaslav defeated Volodimirko's troops at the San River, forcing Volodimirko to sign a peace treaty with Iziaslav. Pope Eugenius III sent his envoys to Hungary to strengthen the "faith and discipline" of the Hungarian church. Géza forbade the papal envoys to enter Hungary, which shows that his relationship with the Holy See had deteriorated.

Géza planned to invade Paristrion—the Byzantine province along the Lower Danube—in the spring of 1153. According to John Kinnamos, Géza sought vengeance for Manuel's invasion of 1150; on the other hand, Michael of Thessalonica wrote that Géza prevented Emperor Manuel from invading Southern Italy. However, the emperor, who had been informed of Géza's plan, marched to the Danube. Géza sent his envoys to the emperor and a new peace treaty was signed in Sardica (now Sofia in Bulgaria). In accordance with the peace treaty, the Byzantines released their Hungarian prisoners of wars, according to Abū Hāmid al-Gharnātī, a Muslim traveler from Granada who lived in Hungary between 1150 and 1153.

Abū Hāmid stated that every country feared Géza's attack, "because of the many armies he has at his disposal and his great courage". The Muslim traveler observed that Géza employed Muslim soldiers who had been recruited from among the peoples of the Eurasian steppes. Abū Hāmid even urged the soldiers to make "every effort to go on jihad" with Géza "for thus God [would] set down the merit of Holy War to [their] account". Géza allowed his Muslim subjects to take concubines, which stirred up the Hungarian clergy. He also invited Western European (primarily German) knights to settle in Hungary. For instance, he made a land grant to two knights, named Gottfried and Albert, who had "abandoned their homeland" upon his invitation in the 1150s. Some years earlier, one Hezelo of Merkstein sold his patrimony in the region of Aachen before departing to Hungary from where he never returned to his homeland. According to the Diploma Andreanum of 1224, which spelled out the privileges of the Transylvanian Saxons, their ancestors were invited by Géza to settle in southern Transylvania.

Pope Anastasius IV declared Géza's rule in Dalmatia unlawful in October 1154. Emperor Manuel's cousin, Andronikos Komnenos, who administered Belgrade, Braničevo and Niš sent a letter to Géza in 1154, offering to hand over those towns to Géza in exchange for Géza's support against the emperor. Géza sent his envoys to Sicily to sign a new alliance with William I of Sicily around the end of the year, but William I was fighting with his rebellious subjects. Although Andronius Komnenus's plot was discovered and he was captured, Géza invaded the Byzantine Empire and laid siege to Braničevo in late 1154. After hearing of the imprisonment of Andronikus Komnenos, Géza abandoned the siege and returned to Hungary. A Byzantine general, Basil Tzintziluces, launched an attack on the Hungarian army, but Géza annihilated the Byzantine forces before returning to Hungary. In early 1155, the Byzantine and Hungarian envoys signed a new peace treaty. In the same year, a Byzantine army expelled Géza's ally, Desa, from Serbia and restored Uroš II, who had promised that he would not enter into an alliance with Hungary.

=== Last years (1155–1162) ===
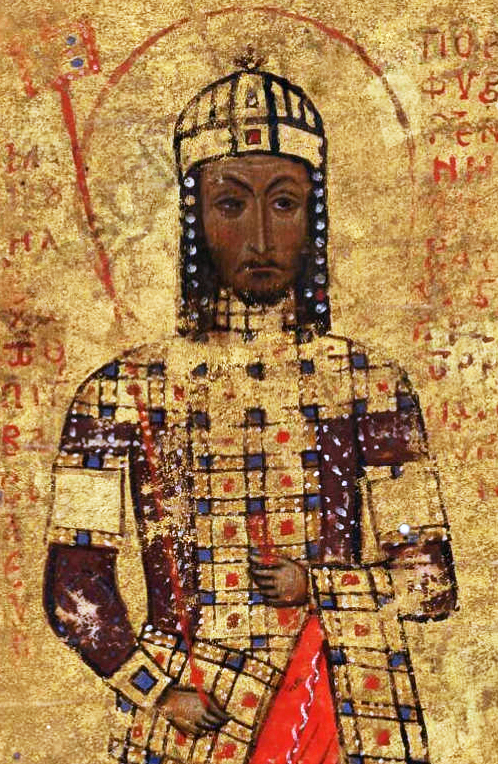
The Byzantine Emperor Manuel I Komnenos, a powerful enemy of Géza in the early 1150s

Frederick Barbarossa, who had been crowned Holy Roman Emperor, received the envoys of Manuel I in Nuremberg in July 1156. The Byzantine envoys proposed a joint invasion of Hungary, but Barbarossa refused their offer. On 16 September, Barbarossa stipulated that the dukes of Austria were to support the Holy Roman emperors during a war against Hungary in his charter by which he elevated Austria to a duchy, showing that the relationship between Hungary and the Holy Roman Empire was still tense. Barbarossa's close advisor, Daniel, Bishop of Prague, visited Hungary in the summer of 1157. On this occasion, Géza promised that he would support Barbarossa with auxiliary troops if the emperor invaded Italy.

According to the nearly contemporaneous Rahewin, Géza's youngest brother, Stephen, began conspiring with their uncle, Beloš, and other lords of the realm. To avoid a civil war, Géza first ordered the persecution of Stephen's supporters, then had his rebellious brother expelled from the kingdom and later sentenced him to death. Niketas Choniates also recorded that Stephen had been "forced to flee from the murderous clutches" of Géza. Géza's uncle, Beloš, was not mentioned in royal charters issued after March 1157, which suggest that he had left Hungary after that date. During the summer of 1157, Stephen fled to the Holy Roman Empire, seeking Emperor Frederick's protection. Frederick Barbarossa demanded to be made arbitrator in Géza's conflict with Stephen, he accepted the demand and sent envoys to Regensburg in January 1158. However, Barbarossa "decided to defer the settlement to a more suitable time" and departed for his campaign against the Lombards in Italy. In accordance with his former promise, Géza sent a unit of between 500–600 archers to accompany the emperor on his campaign. Before long, Géza's brother, Stephen, left for the Byzantine Empire and settled in Constantinople where he married Emperor Manuel's niece Maria Komnene. Within two years, he was joined by his brother, Ladislaus, who also fled from Hungary around 1160.

Frederick Barbarossa forced the Italian towns to surrender in September 1158. However, Milan and Crema again rose up in open rebellion against the emperor's rule after the Diet of Roncaglia ordered the restoration of imperial rights, including the emperor's rights to levy taxes in the Northern Italian towns. Géza sent his envoys to Barbarossa's camp and promised to dispatch further reinforcements against the rebellious towns.

The death of Pope Adrian IV on 1 September 1159 caused a schism, because the college of the cardinals was divided: the majority of the cardinals was opposed to Barbarossa's policy, but a minority supported him. The first group elected Alexander III pope, but Barbarossa's supporters chose Victor IV. Emperor Frederick summoned a synod to Pavia to put an end to the schism. Géza sent his envoys to the church council where Victor IV was declared the lawful pope in February 1160. However, Lucas, Archbishop of Esztergom, remained loyal to Alexander III and persuaded Géza to start negotiations with the representatives of Alexander III. Géza only decided to change sides after most European monarchs, including the kings of Sicily, England and France, joined Alexander III. Géza's envoys announced his decision to Alexander III in early 1161, but Géza only informed the emperor of his recognition of Alexander III in the autumn of the same year.

Géza's and Alexander III's envoys signed a concordat in the summer of 1161. According to that treaty, Géza promised that he would not depose or transfer prelates without the consent of the Holy See; on the other hand, the pope acknowledged that no papal legates could be sent to Hungary without the king's permission and the Hungarian prelates were only allowed to appeal to the Holy See with the king's consent. He also signed a truce for five years with the Byzantine Empire. Shortly before his death, Géza granted Dalmatia, Croatia and other territories to his younger son, Béla, as an appanage duchy. Géza died on 31 May 1162 and was buried in Székesfehérvár.

== Family ==
Ancestors of Géza II of Hungary

16. Béla I of Hungary
8. Géza I of Hungary
17. Richeza or Adelaide of Poland
4. Álmos, Duke of Croatia
9. Sophia
2. Béla II of Hungary
10. Sviatopolk II of Kiev
5. Predslava of Kiev
1. Géza II of Hungary
12. Vukan I of Serbia/Marko
6. Uroš I of Serbia
3. Helena of Serbia
14. Constantine Diogenes
7. Anna Diogenissa
15. Theodora Komnene

Géza's wife, Euphrosyne of Kiev, was a daughter of Grand Prince Mstislav I of Kiev. She survived Géza and died around 1193. Their first child, Stephen, was born in the summer of 1147; he succeeded Géza in 1162. His younger brother, Béla, was born in about 1148; he inherited Hungary after the death of Stephen in 1172. Géza's third son and namesake, Géza, was born in the 1150s. The youngest son of Géza and Euphrosyne, Árpád, did not survive childhood. Géza's and Euphrosyne's oldest daughter, Elizabeth, was given in marriage to Frederick of Bohemia, who was the heir to Vladislaus II, Duke of Bohemia, in 1157. The second daughter, Odola, married Vladislaus II of Bohemia's younger son, Sviatopluk, in 1164. The third daughter of Géza and Euphrosyne, Helena, became the wife of Leopold V of Austria in 1174.

== Sources ==
=== Primary sources ===
- Archdeacon Thomas of Split: History of the Bishops of Salona and Split (Latin text by Olga Perić, edited, translated and annotated by Damir Karbić, Mirjana Matijević Sokol and James Ross Sweeney) (2006). CEU Press. ISBN 963-7326-59-6.
- O City of Byzantium, Annals of Niketas Choniatēs (Translated by Harry J. Magoulias) (1984). Wayne State University Press. ISBN 978-0-8143-1764-8.
- Odo of Deuil: De Profectione Ludovici VII in Orientem: The Journey of Louis VII to the East (Edited with an English Translation by Virginia Gingerick Berry) (1948). Columbia University Press.
- Deeds of John and Manuel Comnenus by John Kinnamos (Translated by Charles M. Brand) (1976). Columbia University Press. ISBN 0-231-04080-6.
- The Deeds of Frederick Barbarossa by Otto of Freising and his Continuator, Rahewin (Translated and annotated with an introduction by Charles Christopher Mierow with the collaboration of Richard Emery) (2004). Columbia University Press. ISBN 0-231-13419-3.
- "The Travels of Abū Hāmid al-Andalusī al-Gharnātī, 1130–1155". In Ibn Fadlān: Ibn Fadlān and the Land of Darnkess: Arab Travellers in the Far North (Translated with an Introduction by Paul Lunde and Caroline Stone) (2012). Penguin Books. ISBN 978-0-140-45507-6.

=== Secondary sources ===
- Bartl, Július; Čičaj, Viliam; Kohútova, Mária; Letz, Róbert; Segeš, Vladimír; Škvarna, Dušan (2002). Slovak History: Chronology & Lexicon. Bolchazy-Carducci Publishers, Slovenské Pedegogické Nakladatel'stvo. ISBN 0-86516-444-4.
- Dimnik, Martin (1994). The Dynasty of Chernigov, 1054–1146. Pontifical Institute of Mediaeval Studies. ISBN 0-88844-116-9.
- Dimnik, Martin (2003). The Dynasty of Chernigov, 1146–1246. Cambridge University Press. ISBN 978-0-521-03981-9.
- Engel, Pál (2001). The Realm of St Stephen: A History of Medieval Hungary, 895–1526. I.B. Tauris Publishers. ISBN 1-86064-061-3.
- Érszegi, Géza; Solymosi, László (1981). "Az Árpádok királysága, 1000–1301 [The Monarchy of the Árpáds, 1000–1301]". In Solymosi, László (ed.). Magyarország történeti kronológiája, I: a kezdetektől 1526-ig [Historical Chronology of Hungary, Volume I: From the Beginning to 1526] (in Hungarian). Akadémiai Kiadó. pp. 79–187. ISBN 963-05-2661-1.
- Fine, John V. A. Jr. (1991) [1983]. The Early Medieval Balkans: A Critical Survey from the Sixth to the Late Twelfth Century. Ann Arbor: University of Michigan Press. ISBN 0-472-08149-7.
- Fügedi, Erik; Bak, János M. (2012). "Foreign Knights and Clerks in Early Medieval Hungary". In Berend, Nóra (ed.). The Expansion of Central Europe in the Middle Ages. Ashgate Variorum. pp. 319–331. ISBN 978-1-4094-2245-7.
- Fuhrmann, Horst (1986). Germany in the high middle ages, c. 1146–1246. Cambridge University Press. ISBN 0-521-31980-3.
- Kristó, Gyula; Makk, Ferenc (1996). Az Árpád-ház uralkodói [Rulers of the House of Árpád] (in Hungarian). I.P.C. Könyvek. ISBN 963-7930-97-3.
- Kristó, Gyula (2007). Magyarország története 895-1301 [History of Hungary] (in Hungarian). Osiris. ISBN 978-963-389-970-0.
- Makk, Ferenc (1989). The Árpáds and the Comneni: Political Relations between Hungary and Byzantium in the 12th century (Translated by György Novák). Akadémiai Kiadó. ISBN 963-05-5268-X.
- Makk, Ferenc (1994). "II. Géza". In Kristó, Gyula; Engel, Pál; Makk, Ferenc (eds.). Korai magyar történeti lexikon (9–14. század) [Encyclopedia of the Early Hungarian History (9th–14th centuries)] (in Hungarian). Akadémiai Kiadó. p. 236. ISBN 963-05-6722-9.
- Runciman, Steven (1989) [1952]. A History of the Crusades, Volume II: The Kingdom of Jerusalem and the Frankish East. Cambridge: Cambridge University Press. ISBN 0-521-06162-8.
- Sălăgean, Tudor (2005). "Romanian Society in the Early Middle Ages (9th–14th Centuries AD)". In Pop, Ioan-Aurel; Bolovan, Ioan (eds.). History of Romania: Compendium. Romanian Cultural Institute (Center for Transylvanian Studies). pp. 133–207. ISBN 978-973-7784-12-4.
- Stephenson, Paul (2000). Byzantium's Balkan Frontier: A Political Study of the Northern Balkans, 900–1204. Cambridge University Press. ISBN 978-0-521-02756-4.

Géza II of Hungary House of Árpád Born: 1130 Died: 31 May 1162
Regnal titles
Preceded by Béla II	King of Hungary and Croatia; 1141–1162	Succeeded by Stephen III
