= Otto I, Duke of Bavaria =

Duke of Bavaria from 1180 (1117–1183)

Otto I
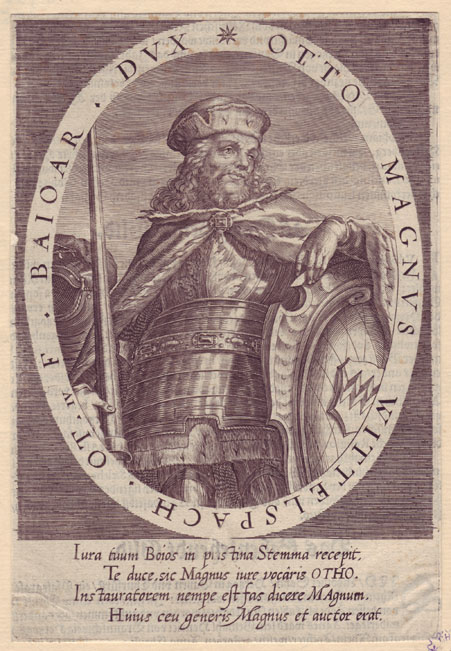
- Engraving from c. 1650

Duke of Bavaria
- Reign: 16 September 1180 – 11 July 1183
- Predecessor: Henry the Lion
- Successor: Louis I
- Born: 1117; Kelheim, Duchy of Bavaria, Holy Roman Empire
- Died: 11 July 1183; Pfullendorf, Holy Roman Empire
- Burial: Scheyern Abbey
- Spouse: Agnes of Loon
- Issue Detail: Sophia; Richardis; Louis I
- House: House of Wittelsbach
- Father: Otto IV, Count of Scheyern
- Mother: Heilika of Pettendorf-Lengenfeld

Otto I (1117 – 11 July 1183), called the Redhead (German: der Rotkopf), was Duke of Bavaria from 1180 until his death. He was the first Bavarian ruler from the House of Wittelsbach, a dynasty which reigned until the abdication of King Ludwig III of Bavaria in the German Revolution of 1918.

A scion of the House of Wittelsbach, which had ruled as Counts of Scheyern in Upper Bavaria since the 11th century, Otto was a close ally of the Holy Roman Emperor Frederick Barbarossa from the Hohenstaufen dynasty. As Otto VI, he ruled as Count Palatine of Bavaria from 1156 to 1180. After the deposition of Frederick's rival Duke Henry the Lion from the Welf dynasty, Otto was granted the Duchy of Bavaria as a fief by the Emperor in 1180. Despite initial reluctance to his rule from the wary Bavarian nobility, Otto was able to secure the rule over Bavaria for his dynasty with the support of the emperor and his family.

== Life ==
Duke Otto I was born c. 1117 probably at Kelheim, the son of Count Otto IV of Wittelsbach, Count Palatine of Bavaria from 1120 onwards, and Heilika of Pettendorf-Lengenfeld. His father belonged to a family which had ruled as Counts of Scheyern in Upper Bavaria since the 11th century, and whose older line called themselves Counts of Wittelsbach since the early 12th century due to their relocation to Wittelsbach Castle in Swabia. His mother was, through her own mother, a granddaughter of duke Frederick I of Swabia from the Hohenstaufen family. One of his brothers, Conrad of Wittelsbach would become Archbishop of Mainz and Salzburg.

Upon the death of his father in 1156, Otto inherited the possessions of the Wittelsbach line of the family, and also succeeded his father as Count Palatine of the Bavarian duchy, then under the rule of Henry the Lion, a scion of the Welf dynasty.

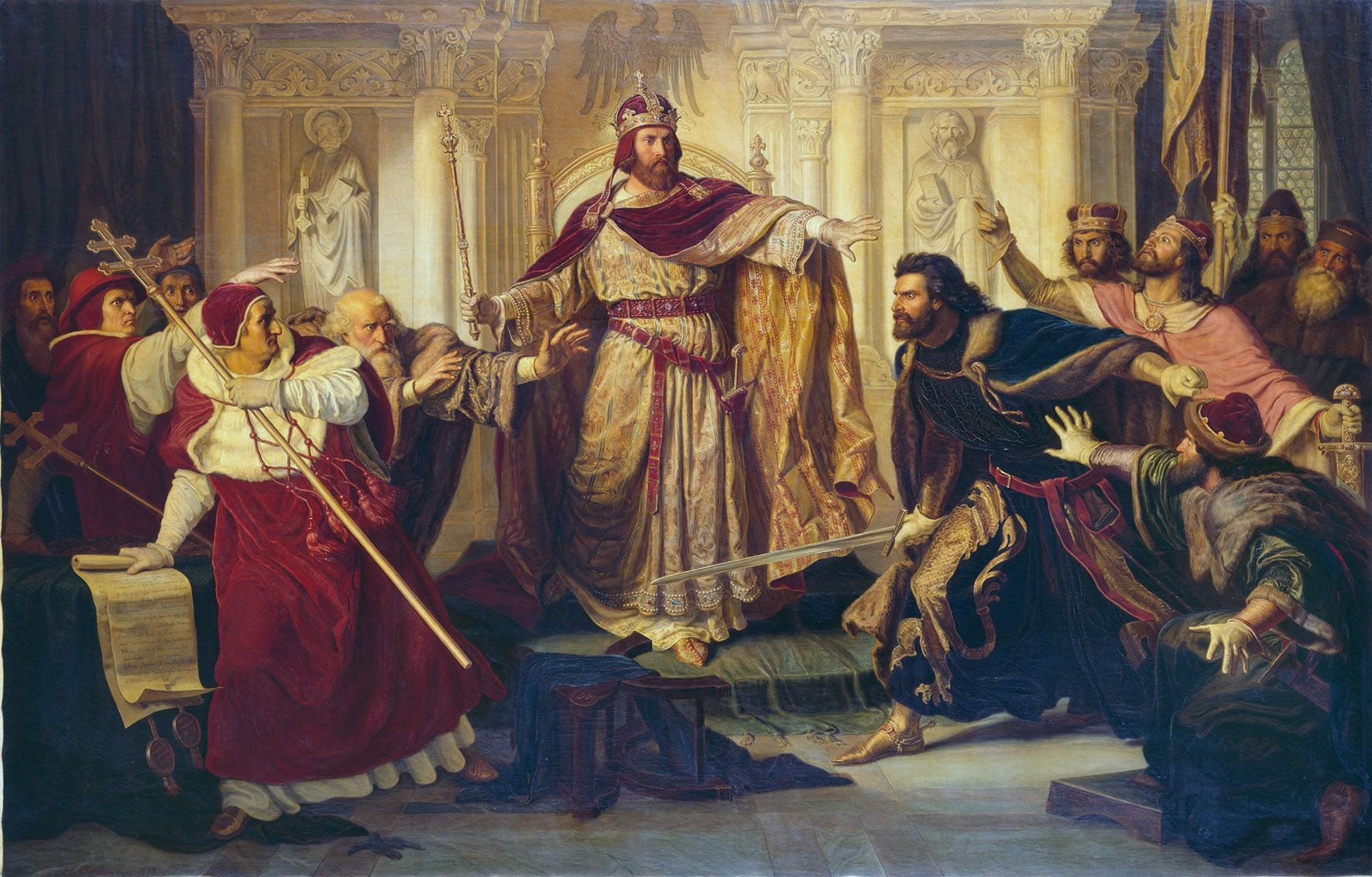
Frederick Barbarossa stops Otto from striking Cardinal Roland at the Diet of Besançon. A romantic painting by Hermann Plüddemann (1859).

Otto was a close ally of the Holy Roman Emperor Frederick Barbarossa, and was militarily and diplomatically active in the service of the Emperor. In 1155, as one of the best knights in the employ of the Emperor, he stormed and conquered the position overlooking and dominating the Defile of Ceraino near Verona with 200 selected soldiers, thus enabling the safe march of Barbarossa's army caravan across the Alps back to Germany after the Emperor's coronation at Rome. In the Dominium mundi conflict between emperor and pope culminating at the 1157 Reichstag of Besançon, fiery Otto could only be kept from smiting the papal legate Cardinal Rolando Bandinelli with his battleaxe by the personal intervention of Frederick.

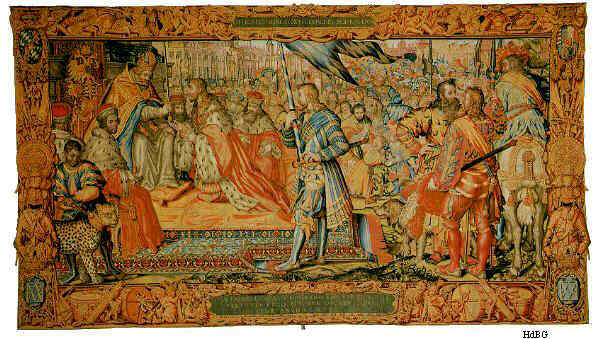
Frederick Barbarossa grants the Duchy of Bavaria to Otto on 16 September 1180. Tapestry from c. 1610 in the Munich Residenz.

He was finally rewarded with the duchy of Bavaria on 16 September 1180 at Altenburg in Thuringia, after the deposition of Duke Henry the Lion. But he was so little regarded by many of the Bavarian aristocracy that they are said to have refused him the customary homage. They went so far as to refuse to attend his first court assembly at Regensburg.

With the separation of Styria under Duke Ottokar IV in the same year, Bavaria lost the last of her southeastern territories. With the support of the emperor and his brother Conrad, Otto was able to secure the rule of his dynasty from the wary Bavarian nobility. His descendants ruled Bavaria for the next 738 years.

In 1182 or 1183, Duke Otto bought Dachau castle, the ministeriales, and all other appurtenances for a large sum of cash from the widow of the last duke of Dachau and Merania, Conrad II, Duke of Merania.

In 1183 Otto accompanied Emperor Frederick to sign the Peace of Constance with the Lombard League and died suddenly on the way back at Pfullendorf in Swabia. He was succeeded by his only surviving son Louis. Otto's mortal remains are buried in the crypt of Scheyern Abbey.

== Issue ==
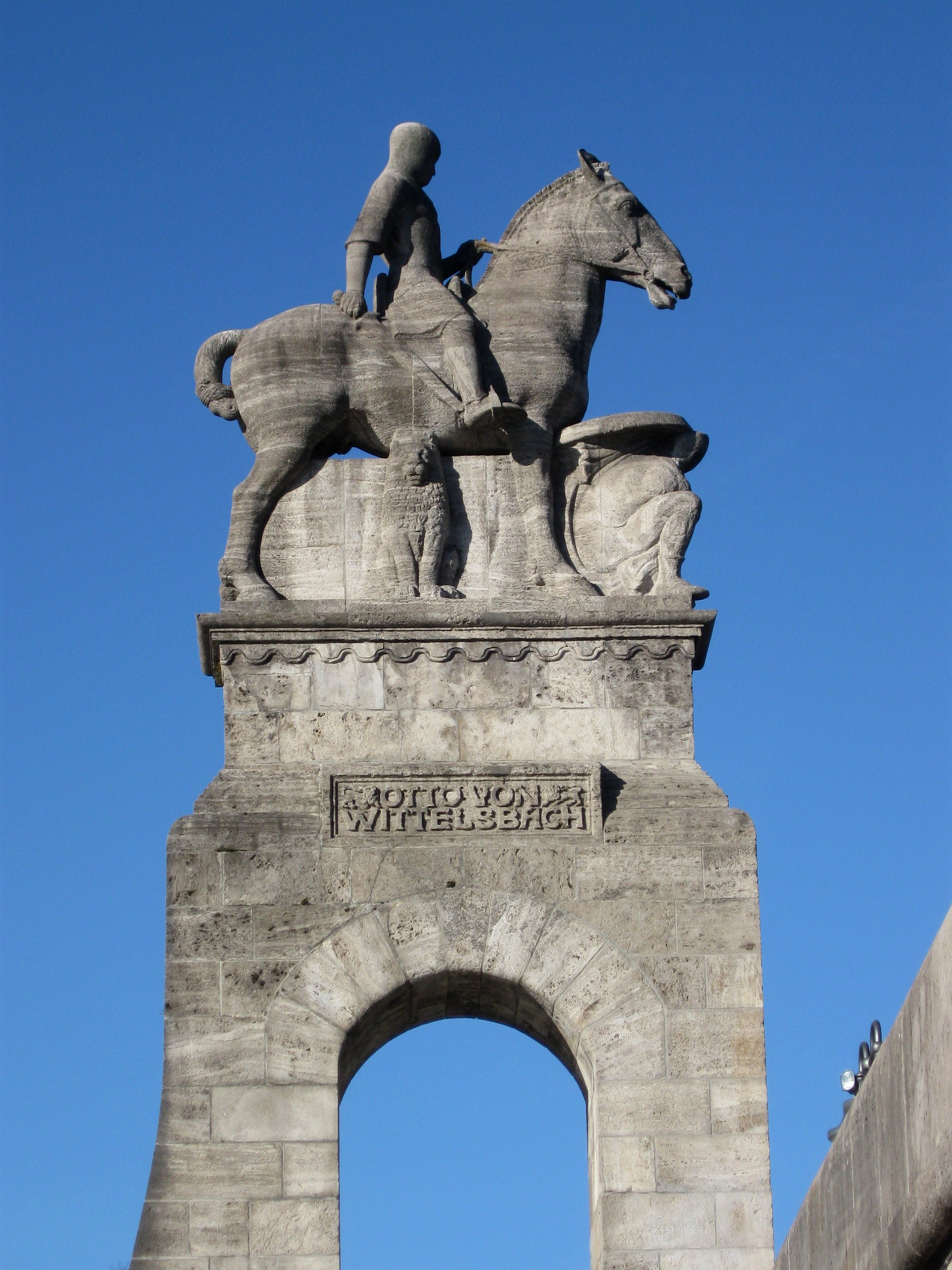
Otto von Wittelsbach, Wittelsbach Bridge in Munich, sculptor Georg Wrba

About 1169 Otto married Agnes, a daughter of Count Louis I of Loon. Agnes and Otto had the following children:

- Otto (1169–1181)
- Ulrich († 29 May...)
- Agnes (1172 - 13 January 1200), married in 1186 to Henry von Plain
- Heilika I (1171-1200), married in 1184 to Hallgrave Dietrich of Wasserburg
- Richardis (1173 - 20 September 1231), married ca. 1188 to Count Otto I of Guelders and Zutphen
- Louis I (1173–1231), married in 1204 to Ludmilla of Bohemia
- Heilika II (1176-1214), married Count Adelbert III of Dillingen (d. 1214)
- Elisabeth (1178-1190), married Count Berthold II of Vohburg (d. 1209)
- Mechtild (1180–1231), married in 1209 to Count Rapoto II of Ortenburg (1164–1231).
- Sophia (1170–1238), married Landgrave Hermann I of Thuringia (1155–1217)

Otto I, Duke of Bavaria House of Wittelsbach Born: 1117 Died: 11 July 1183
Regnal titles
Preceded by Henry XII	Duke of Bavaria; 1180–1183	Succeeded by Louis I
Preceded by Otto V	Count Palatine of Bavaria; 1156–1180	Succeeded by Otto VII
