= Henry Raspe =

German nobleman and throne claimant (c. 1204 – 1247)

- Landgrave of Thuringia
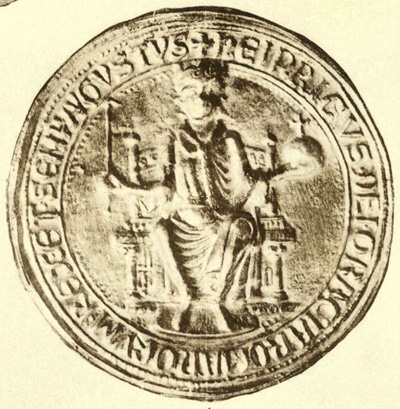
- Seal of Henry as king
- Born: c. 1204
- Died: 16 February 1247 (aged 42–43); Wartburg Castle, Landgraviate of Thuringia, Holy Roman Empire
- Noble family: Ludovingians
- Spouses: Elisabeth of Brandenburg; Gertrude of Babenberg; Beatrice of Brabant
- Father: Hermann I, Landgrave of Thuringia
- Mother: Sophia of Wittelsbach

Henry Raspe (German: Heinrich Raspe; c. 1204 – 16 February 1247) was the Landgrave of Thuringia from 1231 until 1239 and again from 1241 until his death. In 1246, with the support of the Papacy, he was elected King of Germany in opposition to Conrad IV, but his contested reign lasted a mere nine months.

== Biography ==
Henry Raspe was born c. 1204 to Hermann I, Landgrave of Thuringia and Sophia of Wittelsbach. In 1226, Henry's brother Louis IV, Landgrave of Thuringia, died en route to the Sixth Crusade, and Henry became regent for his under-age nephew Hermann II, Landgrave of Thuringia. He managed to expel his nephew and the boy's young mother, St. Elisabeth of Hungary, from the line of succession and ca. 1231 formally succeeded his brother as landgrave.

In 1242 Henry, together with King Wenceslaus I of Bohemia, he was selected by Emperor Frederick II to be administrator of Germany for Frederick's under-age son Conrad.

After Pope Innocent IV imposed a ban on Frederick in 1245, Raspe changed sides, and on 22 May 1246 he was elected anti-king in opposition to Conrad. The strong papal prodding that led to his election earned Raspe the derogatory moniker of "Pfaffenkönig" (priests' king). The papal legate in Germany was Filippo da Pistoia. In August 1246 Henry defeated Conrad in the Battle on the Nidda in southern Hesse, and laid siege to Ulm and Reutlingen. He suffered a mortal wound, and died 16 February 1247 in Wartburg Castle near Eisenach in Thuringia.

== Personal life ==
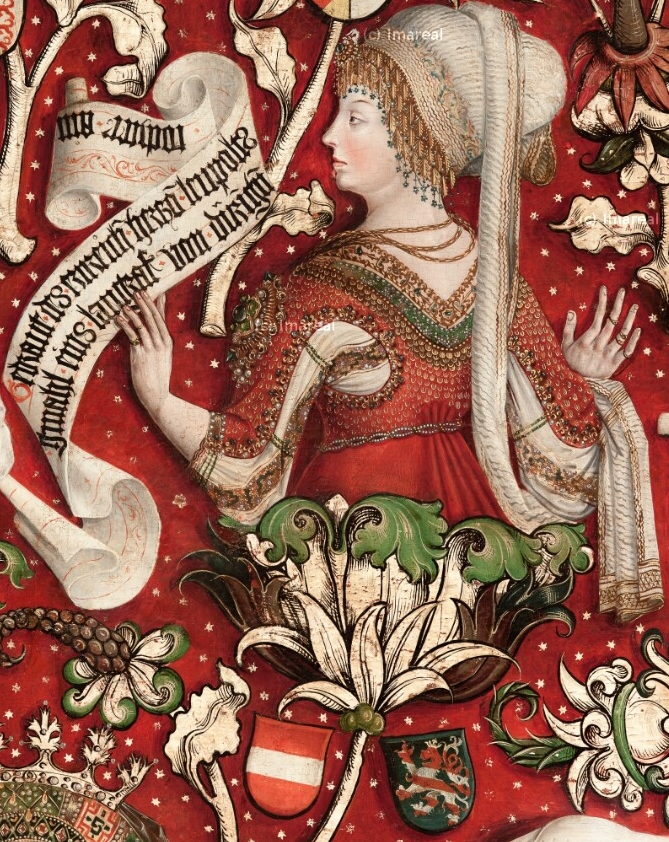
Gertrude of Austria, Landgravine of Thuringia

In 1228, Henry Raspe married Elisabeth (1206–1231), the daughter of Albert II, Margrave of Brandenburg. After her death, he married Gertrude (c. 1210/1215 – 1241), the daughter of Leopold VI, Duke of Austria. After Gertrude of Babenberg's death, he married Beatrice of Brabant (1225–1288), the daughter of Henry II, Duke of Brabant.

All three of his marriages were childless. After his death, the Emperor enfeoffed Thuringia to Henry III, Margrave of Meissen, the son of his sister Jutta.

== Bibliography ==
- Cox, Eugene L. (1974). The Eagles of Savoy. Princeton University Press.
- Knodler, Julia (2010). "Germany: Narrative (1125–1250)". The Oxford Encyclopedia of Medieval Warfare and Military Technology. Vol. 1. Oxford University Press.
- Lyon, Jonathan R. (2013). Princely Brothers and Sisters: The Sibling Bond in German Politics, 1100–1250. Cornell University Press.
- Rasmussen, Ann Marie (1997). Mothers and Daughters in Medieval German Literature. Syracuse University Press. ISBN 978-0815603894.
- Rogers, C.J.; Caferro, W.; Reid, S. (2010). The Oxford Encyclopedia of Medieval Warfare and Military Technology. Oxford University Press. ISBN 978-0-19-533403-6.
- Stubbs, William (1908). Germany in the Later Middle Ages, 1200–1500. Longmans, Green and Co.
- Van Cleve, Thomas C. (1969). "The Crusade of Frederick II". In Wolff, Robert Lee; Hazard, Harry W. (eds.). A History of the Crusades. Vol. II. The University of Wisconsin Press.
- Van Cleve, Thomas C. (1972). The Emperor Frederick II of Hohenstaufen: Immutator Mundi. Clarendon Press.

Henry Raspe Ludowingians Born: 1204 Died: 16 February 1247
Preceded by Hermann II	Landgrave of Thuringia; 1241–1247	Succeeded by Henry the Illustrious
Preceded by Frederick II and Conrad IV	— DISPUTED — King of Germany; 1246–1247; Disputed by Frederick II and Conrad IV	Succeeded by William
