= Hermann I of Thuringia =

Landgrave of Thuringia and Count Palatine of Saxony (died 1217)

Hermann I, Landgrave of Thuringia
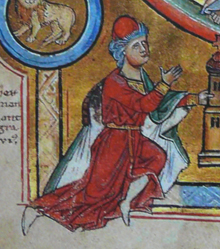
- Picture of Herman I in the Elisabethpsalter
- Born: c. 1155
- Died: 25 April 1217; Gotha
- Buried: Reinhardsbrunn
- Noble family: Ludovingians
- Spouses: Sophia of Sommerschenburg; Sophia of Wittelsbach
- Issue Detail: Jutta; Louis IV; Conrad; Henry Raspe
- Father: Louis II, Landgrave of Thuringia
- Mother: Judith of Hohenstaufen

Hermann I (died 25 April 1217), Landgrave of Thuringia and (as Hermann III) Count Palatine of Saxony, called the Hard, was the second son of Louis II, Landgrave of Thuringia (the Iron), and Judith of Hohenstaufen, the sister of Emperor Frederick Barbarossa.

== Life ==
Little is known of his early years, but in 1180 Hermann joined a coalition against Henry the Lion, Duke of Saxony, and with his brother, Louis III, Landgrave of Thuringia, suffered a short imprisonment after his defeat by Henry at Weissensee. The brothers were released the following year. Louis had been made Count Palatine of Saxony as a reward for his services to the emperor, but transferred the dignity to Hermann. He strengthened his authority over the County Palatine by marrying Sophia, daughter of Lutgard of Stade and Frederick II of Sommerschenburg, a former Count Palatine.

Louis III died in 1190. Emperor Henry VI attempted to seize Thuringia as a vacant fief of the Holy Roman Empire, but Hermann frustrated the plan and established himself as the landgrave. Having joined a league against the emperor, he was accused, probably wrongly, of an attempt to murder him. Henry VI was not only successful in detaching Hermann from the hostile combination, but gained his support for the scheme to unite Sicily with the Empire.

Hermann joined the German Crusade of 1197 but returned on news of Henry VI's death. In the wars between the rival kings, Philip of Swabia and Otto of Brunswick (1198-1208), Hermann's support was purchased by the emperor's brother, Duke Philip of Swabia, but as soon as Philip's cause appeared to be weakening he transferred his allegiance to Otto of Brunswick, the later Emperor Otto IV. Philip accordingly invaded Thuringia in 1204 and compelled Hermann to come to terms by which he surrendered the lands he had obtained in 1198. After the death of Philip and the recognition of Otto, Hermann was among the princes who assembled at Nuremberg in 1211 and invited Frederick of Hohenstaufen, King of Sicily (afterwards Emperor Frederick II), to come to Germany and assume the crown. In consequence of this step the Saxons attacked Thuringia, but the landgrave was saved by Frederick's arrival in Germany in 1212.

After the death of his first wife in 1195, Hermann married Sophia, daughter of Otto of Wittelsbach. By her he had four sons, two of whom, Louis IV of Thuringia and Henry Raspe, succeeded their father in turn as landgrave. His oldest son Louis, who succeeded him, was the husband of St. Elizabeth of Hungary. Hermann died at Gotha in 1217 and was buried at Reinhardsbrunn.

Hermann was fond of the society of men of letters, and Walther von der Vogelweide and other Minnesingers were welcomed to his castle, the Wartburg. In this connection he figures in Richard Wagner's Tannhäuser und der Sängerkrieg auf Wartburg.

== Issue ==
With Sophia of Sommerschenburg:

- Jutta (1184–1235), married twice:
  1. in 1194 to Margrave Theodoric I of Meissen (1161–1221)
  2. in 1223 to Count Poppo VII of Henneberg (d. 1245)
- Hedwig, married in 1211 to Count Albert II of Weimar-Orlamünde

With Sophia of Wittelsbach:

- Irmgard (b. 1197), married in 1211 to Count Henry I of Anhalt
- Herman (b. 1202–1216)
- Louis IV (1200–1227)
- Henry Raspe (1204–1247)
- Conrad (1206–1240), Grand Master of the Teutonic Knights
- Agnes, married twice:
  1. in 1225 to Henry "the Profane" of Babenberg (1208–1228), a son of Duke Leopold VI of Austria. They had a daughter, Gertrude of Austria who claimed the inheritance of the House of Babenberg.
  2. in 1229 to Duke Albert I of Saxony (c. 1175 – 1261)

== Sources ==
- E. Winkelmann, Philipp von Schwaben und Otto IV. von Braunschweig (Leipzig, 1873–1878)
- Knochenhauer, Theodor (1871). Geschichte Thüringens Zur Zeit Des Ersten Landgrafenhauses (1039-1247). Gotha.
- Lyon, Jonathan R. (2013). Princely Brothers and Sisters: The Sibling Bond in German Politics, 1100-1250. Cornell Press. ISBN 978-0-8014-5130-0.
- Mägdefrau, Werner (2010). Thüringen im Mittelalter 1130-1310 Von den Ludowingern zu den Wettinern. Jena: Rockstuhl. ISBN 978-3-86777-152-8.
- Warsitzka, Wilfried (2002). Die Thüringer Landgrafen. Dr. Bussert & Stadeler. ISBN 978-3932906220.

Hermann I of Thuringia Ludowingians Born: c. 1155 Died: 1217
Preceded by Louis III	Landgrave of Thuringia; 1190–1217	Succeeded by Louis IV
