= Otto I of Brunswick-Lüneburg =

German duke (c. 1204–1252)

Otto the Child
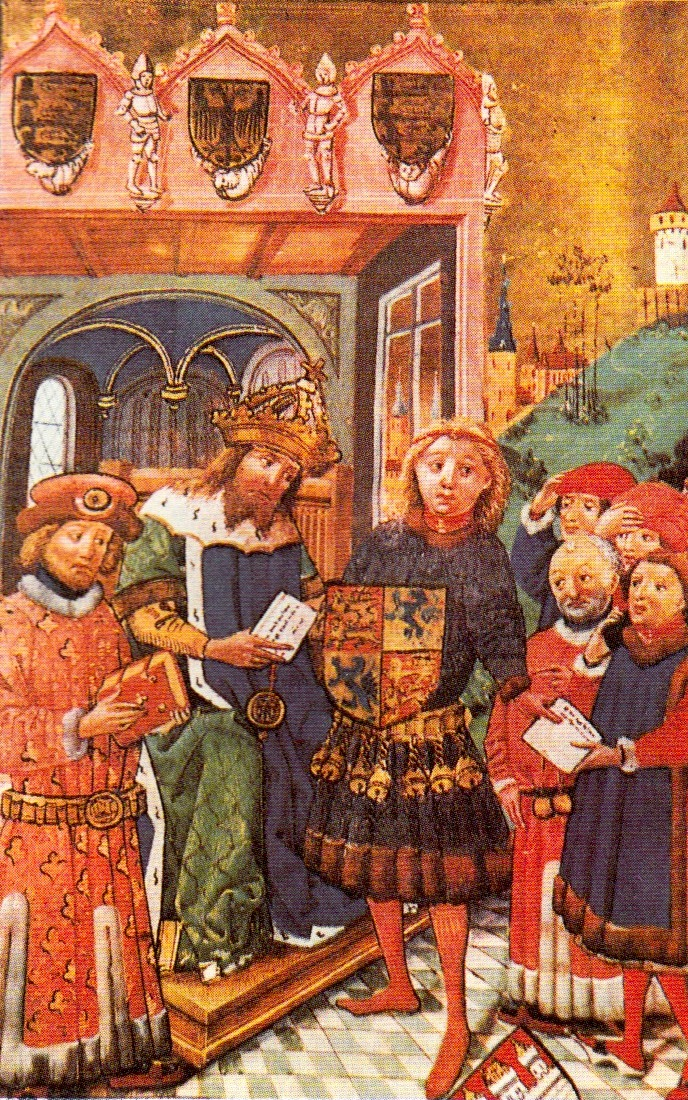
- Otto the Child is enfeoffed with Brunswick-Lüneburg by Emperor Frederick II, Lüneburg Sachsenspiegel, 1448

Duke of Brunswick-Lüneburg
- Reign: 1235–1252
- Predecessor: none
- Successor: Albert the Tall; John
- Born: 1204
- Died: 9 June 1252 (aged 47–48); Lüneburg
- Spouse: Matilda of Brandenburg
- Issue: Albert I; John; Elisabeth
- House: Welf
- Father: William of Winchester
- Mother: Helena of Denmark

Otto I of Brunswick-Lüneburg (about 1204 – 9 June 1252), a member of the House of Welf, was the first duke of Brunswick-Lüneburg from 1235 until his death. He is called Otto the Child to distinguish him from his uncle, Emperor Otto IV.

== Early years ==
Otto was born around 1204 as the only son of William of Winchester and his wife Helena, a daughter of King Valdemar I of Denmark. His father was the youngest son of Henry the Lion, the former duke of Saxony who had been deposed by the Hohenstaufen emperor Frederick Barbarossa in 1180. By a 1202 agreement with his brothers Count Palatine Henry V and King Otto IV, William had received the Welfs' allodial properties in Saxony around Lüneburg.

Otto was still a minor when he inherited his father's estates in 1213. As in 1212 his uncle Henry V had renounced the County Palatine of the Rhine in favour of his sole male heir Henry VI the Younger, whose early death in 1214 may be said to have opened to his cousin Otto a more splendid succession than what belonged to the very circumscribed patrimony of his father. However, his uncle Henry V hesitated between a desire to aggrandize his own children (daughters) and a sense of what was due to the male representative of his name and family, and Otto at first reaped little advantage from these enlarged prospects.

At last, in 1223, Henry V executed a deed by which he appointed his nephew his successor in all that remained of the allodial domains of the duchies of Saxony and Bavaria, and also in the private fiefs which he held as an individual in other parts of the empire. These states, however, constituted so small a portion of the former wealth of his illustrious house, that it should have been thought there was scarcely a pretext for either envy or alarm in the breast of his enemy, yet when the Emperor, Frederick II, was made acquainted with the intentions of the Count Palatine, he began to intrigue with his daughters. That he might have a pretense for depriving Otto of the succession at his uncle's death, he purchased from Margravine Irmgard of Baden and Duchess Agnes of Bavaria their claims as the only issue of the duke of Saxony; and no sooner was the death of Henry announced, than the King of the Romans was dispatched with an imperial force to take possession of the city and territory of Brunswick. But Otto had been regularly acknowledged by the states as their legitimate sovereign and had been received as such by the city and principality. They therefore joined him heartily in repelling this invasion, and the king and his array were compelled to retire, without being able to effect the object which the emperor had in view.

== League with Denmark ==
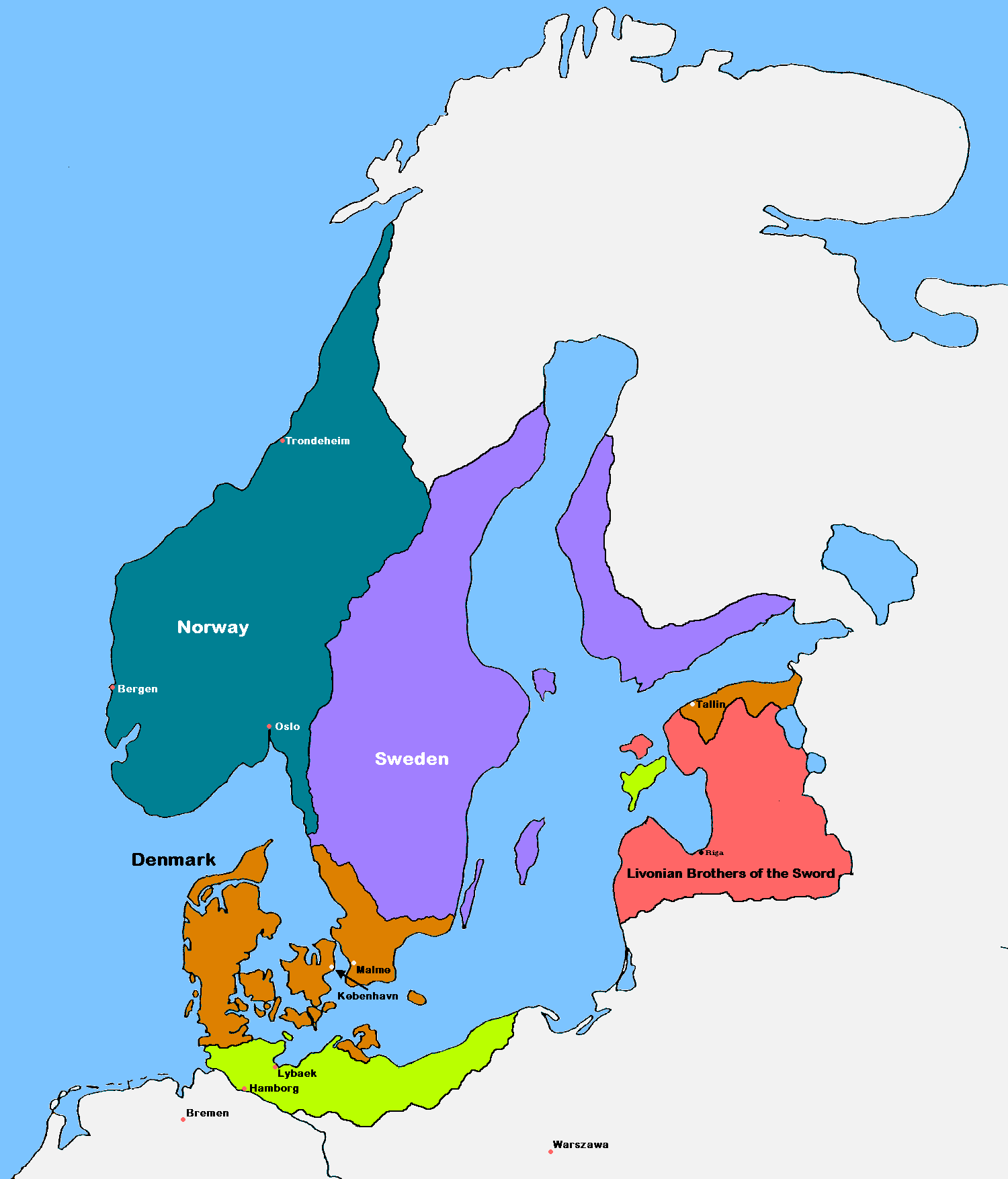
Northern countries in 1219 Norway Sweden Denmark Conquered by Denmark in 1219 (Pomerania conquered in 1219, lost in 1227. Ösel purchased in 1559, lost in 1645) Livonia before 1343

To be prepared against any future attempt of the same kind, Otto judged it prudent at this time to enter into a treaty with his maternal uncle King Valdemar II of Denmark, by which they respectively bound themselves to support each other against all enemies whatsoever. This treaty was in the end most injurious to the states of Brunswick. Otto was made count of Garding and Thetesbüll by King Valdemar, and participated in the Battle of Mölln of 1225 and the Battle of Bornhöved of 1227 on the side of Denmark. After the last battle Otto was imprisoned in Rostock, the capital of Schwerin, where he was shut up in a fortress.

Emperor Frederick II no sooner heard of Otto's confinement, than he again prepared to attack Brunswick. His son, King Henry, was detached with a considerable force to seize upon the city; and that more weight might he given to the expedition, the duke of Bavaria was prevailed upon to accompany him. But on their approach, they found the gates shut, and the citizens prepared to defend their liberties, while they learnt, at the same time, that the king of Denmark was advancing upon their rear. They were therefore compelled to sound a retreat; and luckily for the captive prince, the emperor had become involved in matters of higher importance, and was under the necessity of withdrawing his attention from the conquest of Brunswick.

It happened for the duke of Brunswick, that the count of Schwerin died in 1228, and that on his death-bed he had directed that he should be set at liberty. The duke of Saxony, who claimed a joint right in his detention, refused at first to comply with the dying request of his friend, but when allowed to take possession of the Castle of Hardsacre and other states, as a security for the payment of his ransom, he was permitted to leave his prison. Otto reached Brunswick in September 1228, and was received by his vassals with every mark of respect and attachment. He renewed and confirmed the various charters granted by his ancestors to the city, and greatly enlarged its privileges; while his uncle, the king of Denmark, bestowed as a boon upon the citizens the liberty of trading in his dominions, without paying customs or any other dues.

On his way from Rostock, Otho had spent some days at the court of the margrave of Brandenburg, where he had seen and admired the margrave's daughter Matilda, and no sooner were his private affairs arranged, than he sent to demand the hand of Matilda in marriage. It was an alliance too flattering for the House of Brandenburg to be rejected. Matters were speedily settled, and the marriage ceremony was performed with great splendor at Lüneburg.

By 1227, his father's two brothers, Henry V, Count Palatine of the Rhine, and Otto IV, Holy Roman Emperor, had died without surviving children, and Otto was the only heir of the properties of his grandfather Henry the Lion. But Otto had to battle for his properties against the ruling Hohenstaufen family and against local nobles; he managed to strengthen his position through his marriage to Matilda.

== Ambitions ==
It is alleged by some that the duke of Brunswick was well-inclined to enter into the views of the pope, but that he found he could neither raise men nor money sufficient to warrant even a probability of success. This is doubtful, for had Otto been ambitious, he might have obtained the empire without much difficulty; and supported as he was by England and Denmark, it is not likely that he could have been at a loss for an army, or for the means of supporting it.

As a proof that Otto had the full confidence and support of the king of England, at the moment he obtained his liberty, he wrote to communicate the same to Henry III, who was his cousin, and as Henry's answer dated 6 March 1229 has been preserved by Thomas Rymer, it becomes a valuable part of these annals, as it puts conjecture beyond a doubt.

Later Henry send a letter to the Pope, in which he repeats his thanks to Pope Gregory IX for the zealous part he had taken in procuring the freedom of his dear cousin the duke of Brunswick, and adds, "that as Christian Princes may approach his Holiness with their petitions, he ventures to supplicate a continuance of his especial favor to his said cousin, which by reason of their near connexion in blood he would esteem as much as if shewn to himself." He implores Gregory to promote Otto's honor whenever it is in his power, and to recommend him to the princes of the empire, as often as he had an opportunity, adding, " that he most firmly believed and trusted in the Lord, that among all the princes of the empire he would be found the one most devoted to the interests of the church; and that as he considered his release from prison owing in a great measure to the influence of the Apostolic See, he would consequently be the more obsequious to that power.

In 1235, Otto achieved an agreement with Emperor Frederick II that ended the dispute between Frederick's House of Hohenstaufen and the House of Welf, to which Otto belonged. This dispute had culminated when Henry the Lion was stripped of his duchies in 1180 by Frederick's grandfather, Frederick Barbarossa. According to this agreement, Otto transferred all of his private property to the emperor, who immediately returned it to him as a hereditary imperial fief. In this way, Otto reacquired the status of a prince of the Holy Roman Empire that Henry the Lion had lost. However, the Duchy of Saxony, which Henry had held, had since then passed on to Ascanian dukes, so that the emperor had to create a new duchy for Otto. This was the Duchy of Brunswick-Lüneburg, named after the two central cities around which Otto's former properties were located. Otto could substantially increase his territory by supporting King William, who married his daughter Elisabeth in January 1252.

== Later life and death ==
King William had intimated to the princes of Germany his desire to meet them in a general diet at Frankfurt against the Feast of St. John the Baptist, 1252; he was preparing to leave Brunswick with his father-in-law for the purpose of being present at this assembly when Otto was suddenly taken unwell and expired on 9 June. Otto is buried in Brunswick Cathedral. He is the male-line ancestor of all later members of the House of Welf.

== Children ==
Otto married Matilda, daughter of Albert II, Margrave of Brandenburg, around 1228. They had the following known children:

- Elisabeth (1230 – 27 May 1266), married William II of Holland
- Helen (died 1273), married Albert I, Duke of Saxony and Hermann II, Landgrave of Thuringia
- Adelaide (died 1274), married Henry I, Landgrave of Hesse
- Matilda (died around 1295), married Henry II, Prince of Anhalt-Aschersleben
- Agnes, married Wizlaw II, Duke of Rügen
- Albert I (1236 – 15 August 1279)
- John (c. 1242 – 13 December 1277)
- Otto, Bishop of Hildesheim (died 1279)
- Conrad of Brunswick and Lunenburg, Prince-Bishop of Verden (died 1300)

== Sources ==
- Loud, Graham A.; Schenk, Jochen, eds. (2017). The Origins of the German Principalities, 1100-1350: Essays by German Historians. Routledge.
- Lyon, Jonathan R. (2013). Princely Brothers and Sisters: The Sibling Bond in German Politics, 1100–1250. Cornell University Press.
- Olesen, Jens E. (2010). "A Danish Medieval Empire in the Baltic (1168-1227)". In Imsen, Steinar (ed.). The Norwegian Domination and the Norse World, C.1100-c.1400. Tapir Academic Press.

Otto I of Brunswick-Lüneburg House of Welf Born: about 1204 Died: 9 June 1252
German nobility
Preceded by none	Duke of Brunswick-Lüneburg; 1235–1252	Succeeded by Albert I and John
