= Guelph Treasure =

Collection of medieval ecclesiastical art

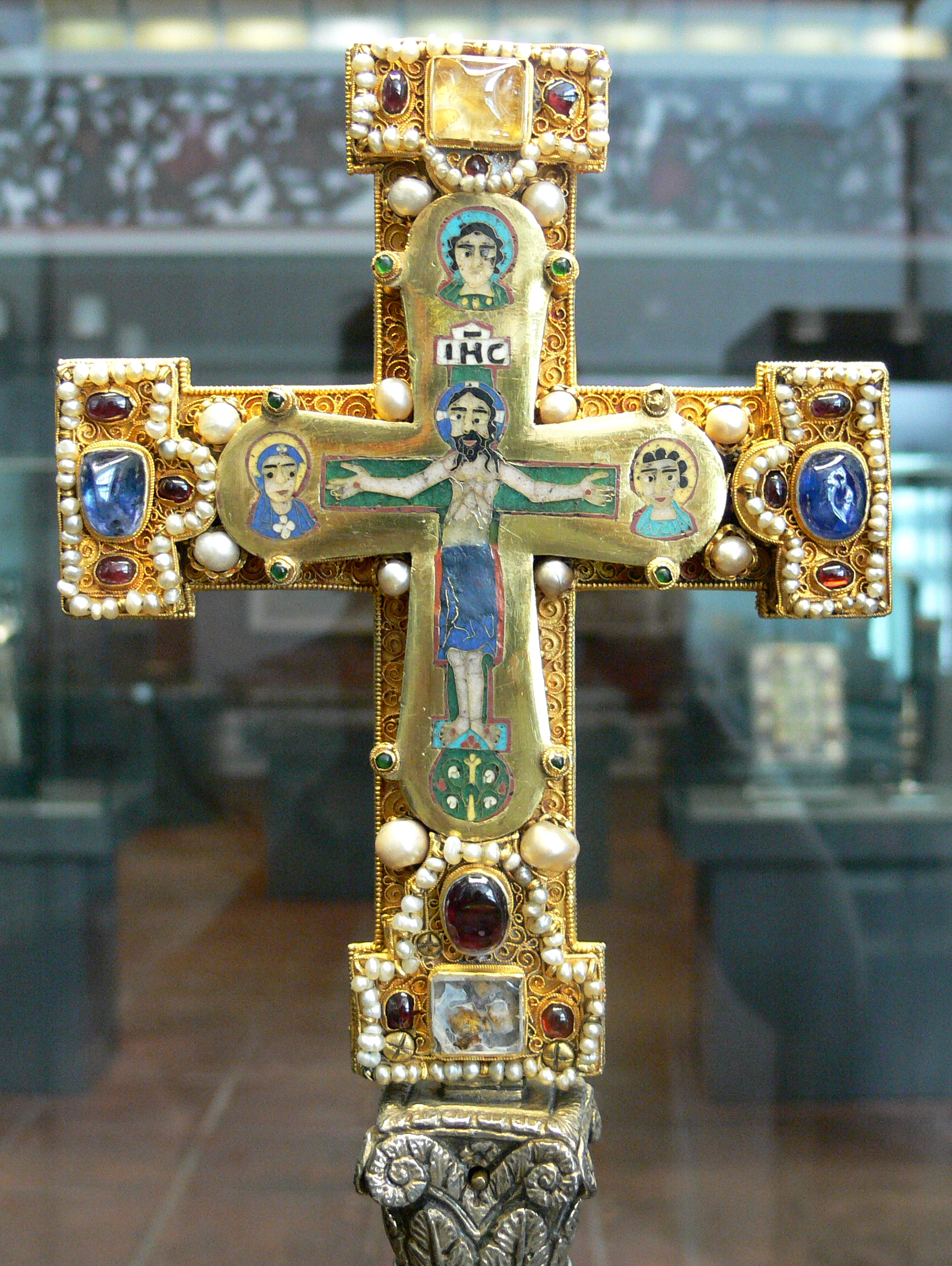
Cross from the Guelph Treasure (Bode Museum, Berlin)

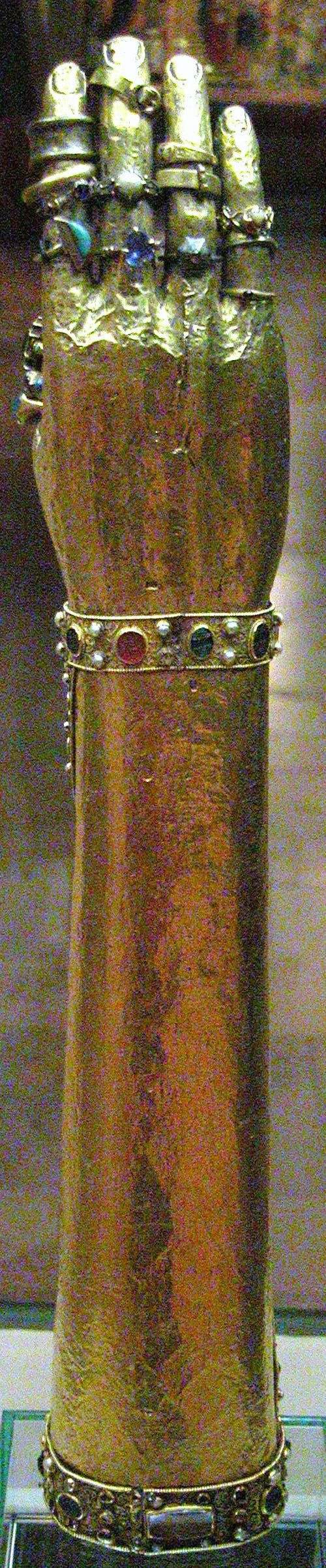
Reliquary of the arm of Saint Blaise (Herzog Anton Ulrich Museum, Dankwarderode Castle)

The Guelph Treasure (German: Welfenschatz) is a collection of medieval ecclesiastical art originally housed at Brunswick Cathedral in Braunschweig, Germany. The Treasure takes its name from the princely House of Guelph (German: Welf) of Brunswick-Lüneburg.

In October 1929, the Treasure, consisting of 82 pieces, was sold by the former Duke of Brunswick to a consortium of Jewish art dealers. In 1935, in the Netherlands, they sold its major portion to agents of Hermann Göring, the second-most powerful man in Nazi Germany.

After World War II, the art dealers' heirs unsuccessfully sought the restitution of the treasure. In Germany, the Limbach Commission, a government advisory body, found that there were no grounds for restitution, and in the U.S., the Supreme Court ruled in the 2021 case Germany v. Phillipp that the U.S. courts had no jurisdiction over the restitution claims.

== History ==
The Guelph Treasure was originally housed at Brunswick Cathedral in Braunschweig, Germany. Most of the objects were removed from the cathedral in the 17th century and passed into the hands of John Frederick, Duke of Brunswick-Lüneburg, in 1671, and remained in the Court Chapel at Hannover until 1803.

In 1929 Ernest Augustus, former Duke of Brunswick, Head of House of Hanover, sold 82 items to a consortium of Frankfurt art dealers Saemy Rosenberg, Isaak Rosenbaum, Julius Falk Goldschmidt and Zacharias Hackenbroch for the price of 7.5 million Reichsmark.

Items from the Treasure were exhibited in the United States in 1930–31. The Cleveland Museum of Art purchased nine pieces and more were sold to other museums and private collectors. In 1935 the remaining 42 pieces of the collection were sold for 4.25 million Reichsmarks in a transaction in the Netherlands to agents of Hermann Göring, the second most powerful man in Nazi Germany. It is claimed that, in turn, Göring personally presented the Treasure as a gift to Adolf Hitler, although this is disputed by the Limbach Commission. It was then placed on display in the Bode Museum in Berlin, where it remains.

== Restitution claims ==
=== Proceedings in Germany ===
In 2008 a case for restitution was lodged in Germany by the heirs of the Jewish art dealers over the pieces sold in 1934. In March 2014 the Limbach Commission, an advisory body to the German government, concluded that the treasure should not be handed over as the case did not meet the criteria defining a forced sale due to Nazi persecution. This determination was based on historical facts, which have been verified by source materials. This, among other points, included the fact that since 1930 the Guelph Treasure had been located outside Germany, and the German state had no access to it at any time during the sales negotiations. Additionally the purchase price paid was within the scope of what was usual and achievable on the art market at the time and the sellers received the agreed purchase price.

=== U.S. court case ===
In February 2015, the heirs to the Jewish art dealers sued Germany and the Bode Museum (via the Prussian Cultural Heritage Foundation) in the United States District Court for the District of Columbia in order to recover the treasure, citing that the Foreign Sovereign Immunities Act (FSIA) enables them to sue Germany in United States courts for compensation of property taken from the dealers as "rights in property taken in violation of international law". A few days before, Germany declared the collection a national cultural treasure, meaning the art pieces can no longer leave the country without the explicit permission of the country's culture minister. It is unclear if the German Culture Minister Monika Grütters was aware of the US lawsuit at the time of the announcement.

Germany sought to dismiss the case, arguing that FSIA did not apply to the sale of goods that did not cross any international borders. The District Court denied the motion to dismiss, which was upheld at the United States Court of Appeals for the District of Columbia Circuit. Germany petitioned to the United States Supreme Court to rule on the matter. The Supreme Court granted Germany's petition, and heard the case in December 2020. In February 2021, the Court ruled in a unanimous decision that the heirs could not sue Germany under FSIA since the provision related to "rights in property taken" was limited to actions between foreign states, and not between states and individuals. However, the Supreme Court remanded the case back to lower courts on the basis that there may be other options whereby the heirs could seek compensation from Germany.

== See also ==
- Gospels of Henry the Lion
- Herzog August Library
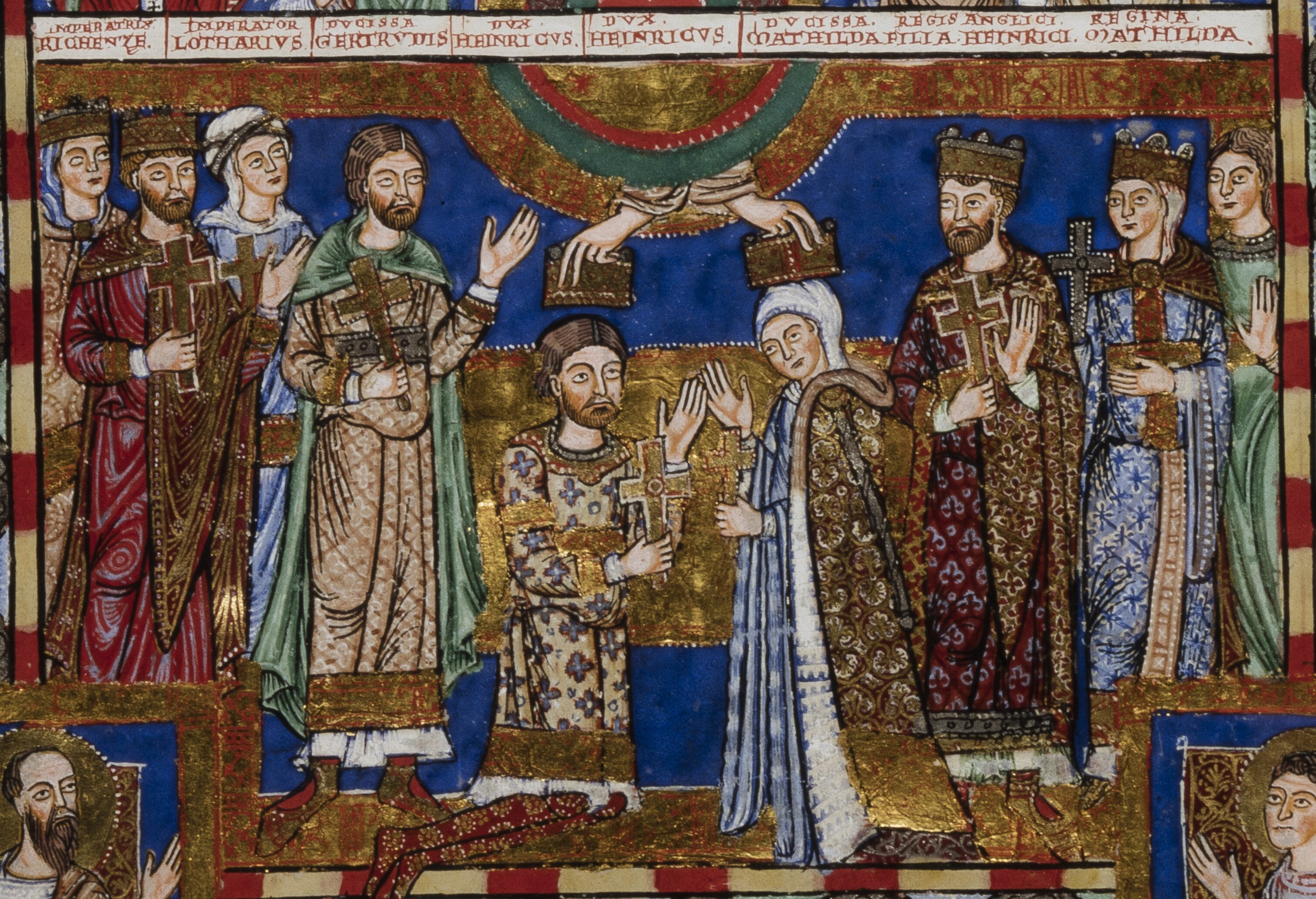
Gospels of Henry the Lion showing Henry the Lion and Matilda Plantagenet (Herzog August Bibliothek in Wolfenbüttel)

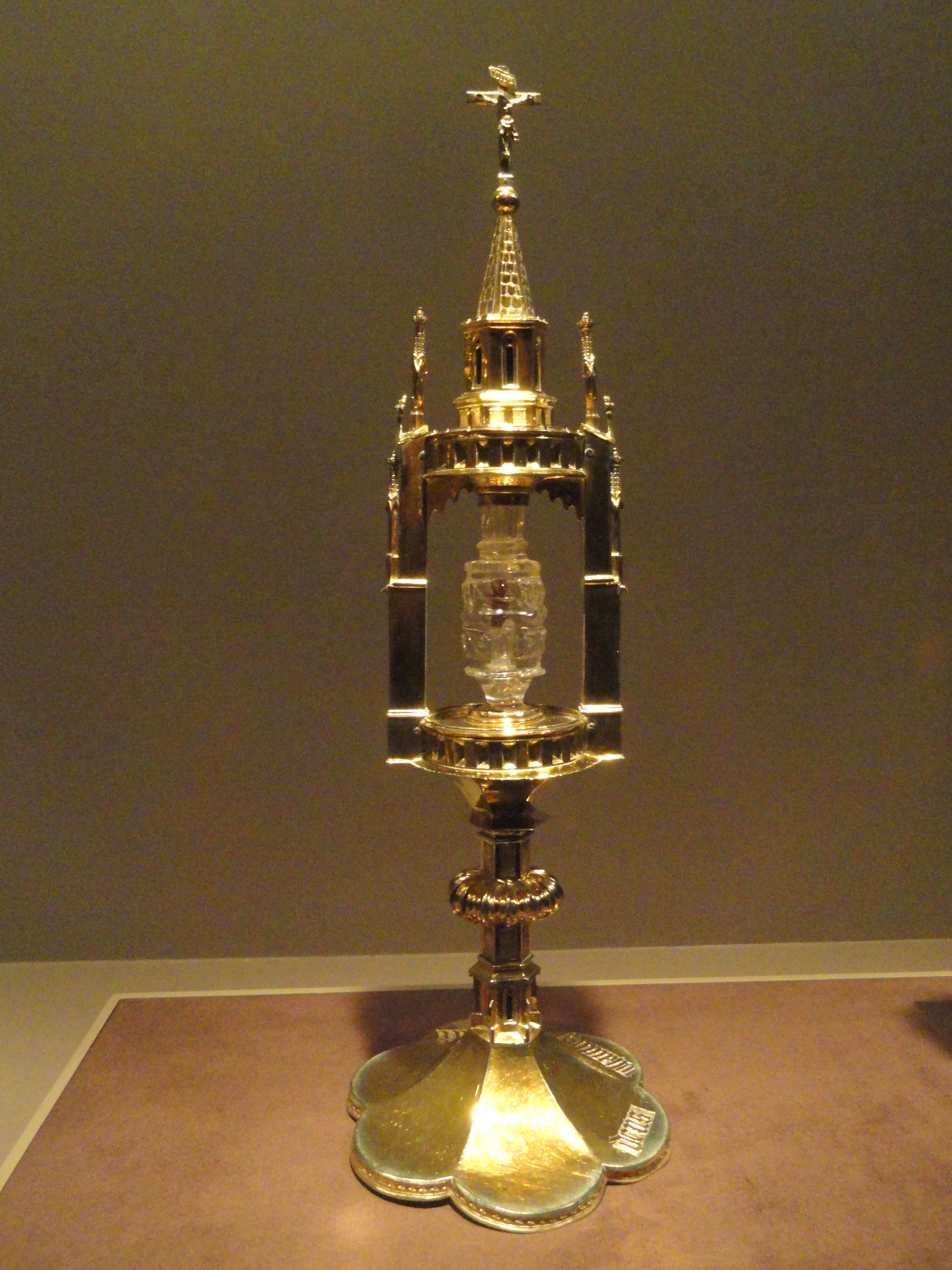
Reliquary with Tooth of Saint John the Baptist, rock crystal c. 1000, Egypt, silver gilt metalwork 1375–1400, Braunschweig, Germany (Art Institute of Chicago)

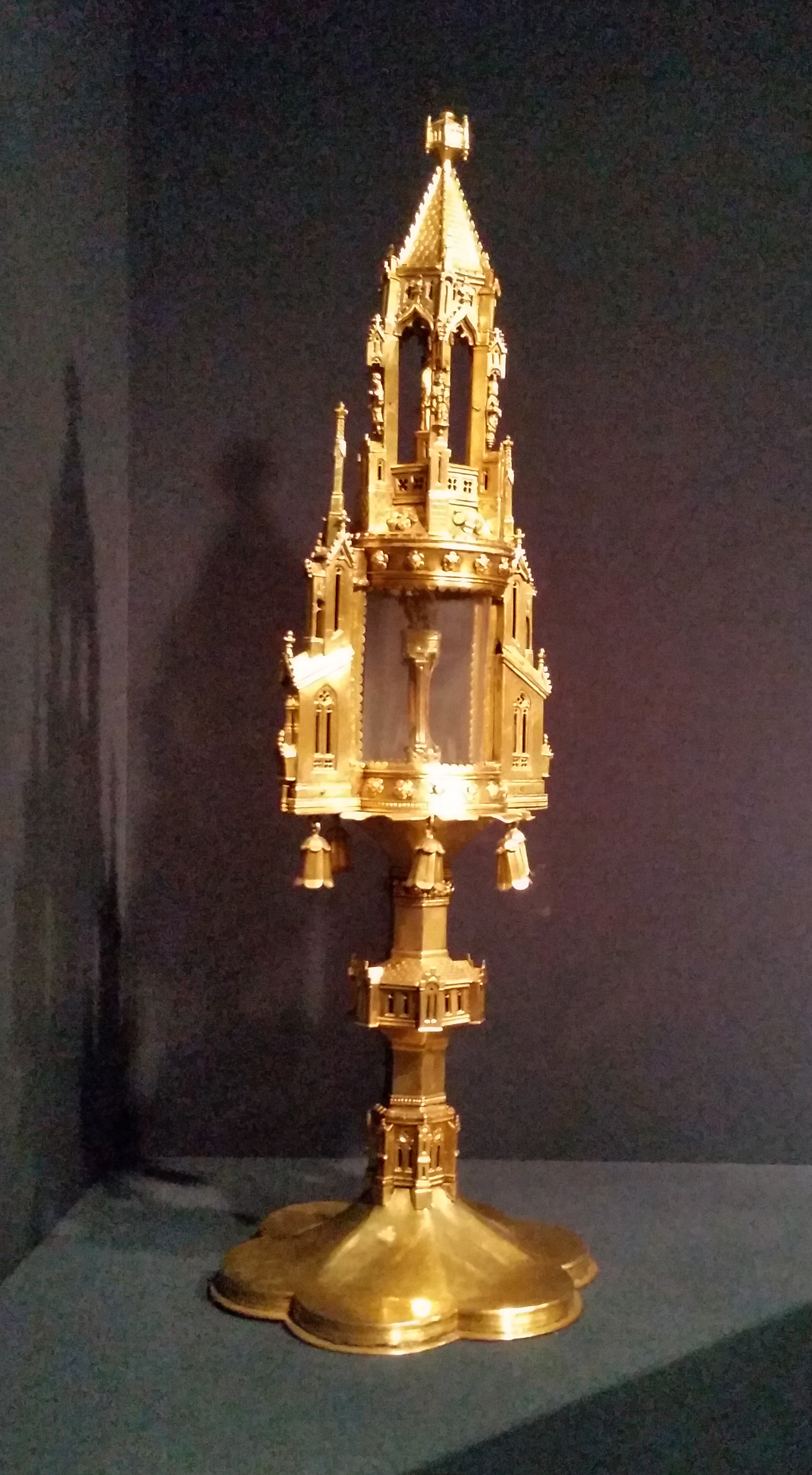
This reliquary is composed of Gothic architectural elements such as pinnacled buttresses and a tower on which a small figure of Saint John the Baptist stands. Although a replacement, the glass cylinder holds the original relic: a finger bone, allegedly of Saint John the Baptist, in a gold mount. This reliquary was once part of the Guelph Treasure accumulated by the dukes of Brunswick beginning in the 11th century. (The Nelson-Atkins Museum of Art, Kansas City, Missouri USA)

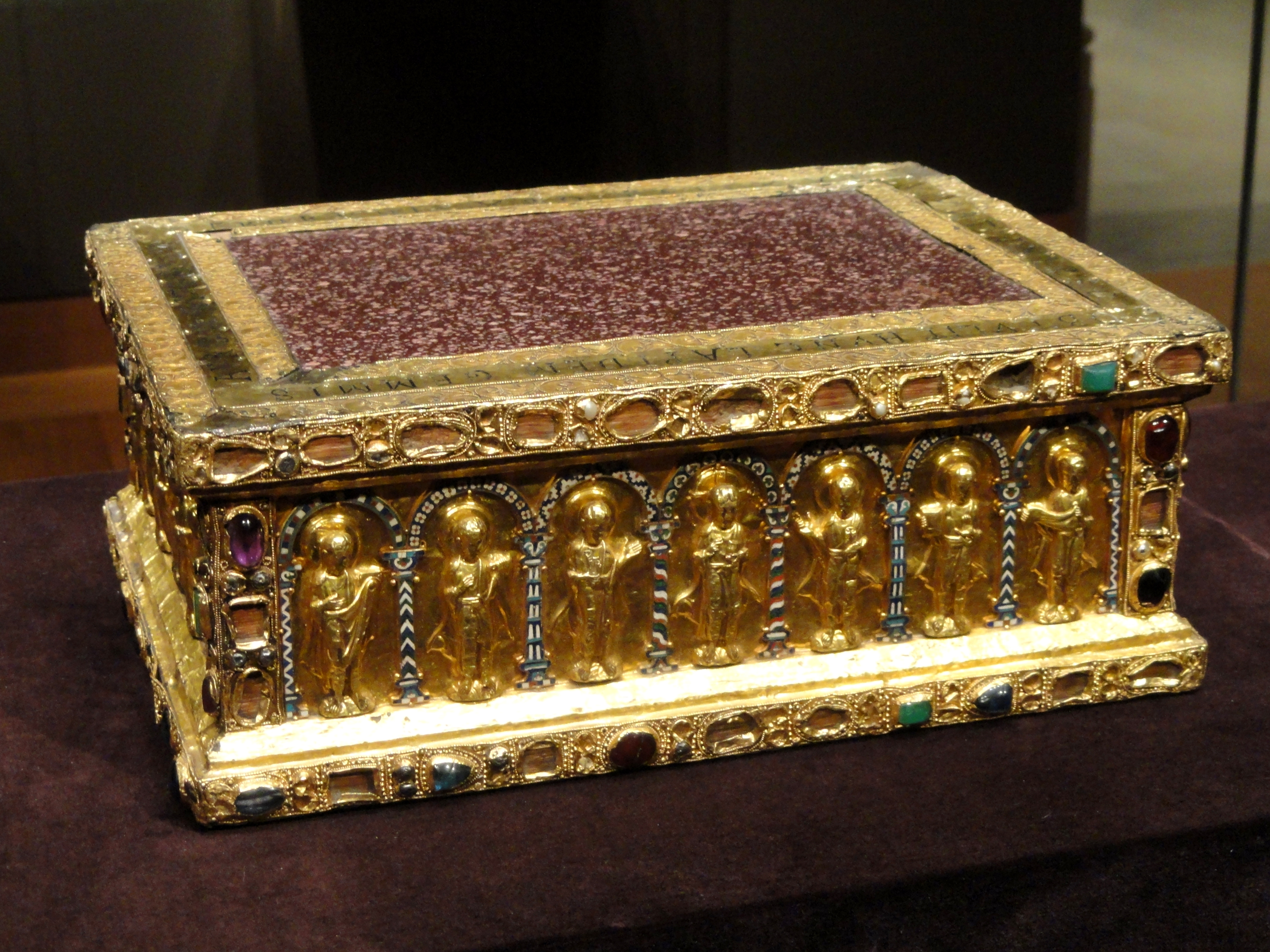
Portable Altar of Countess Gertrude, shortly after 1038, from the Guelph Treasure, German, Lower Saxony, gold, enamel, porphyry, gems, pearls, niello (Cleveland Museum of Art)

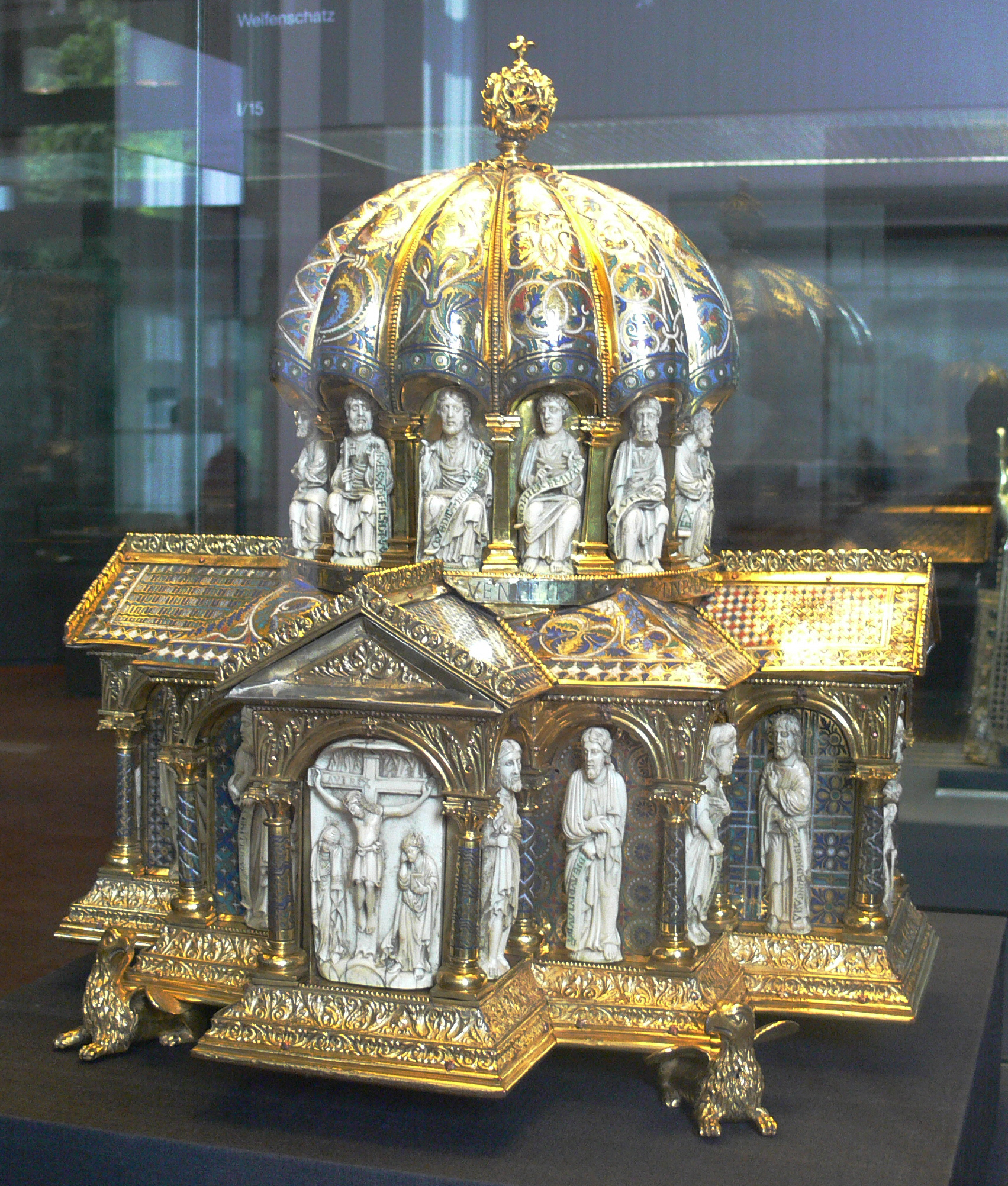
Dome reliquary, end of 12th century (Kunstgewerbemuseum Berlin)

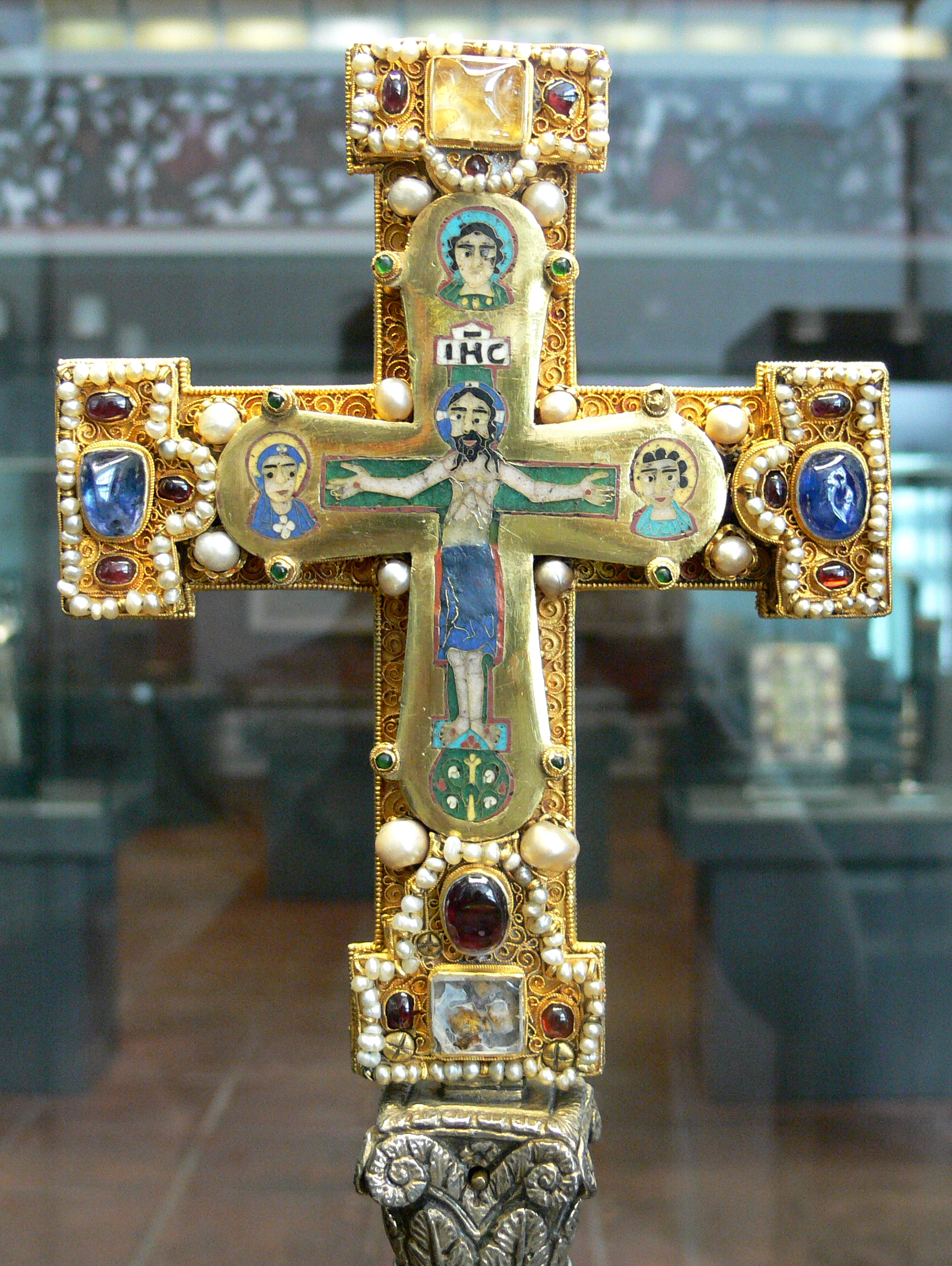
Guelph Cross (Berlin)
