= Valdemar I of Denmark =

King of Denmark from 1154 to 1182

Valdemar I
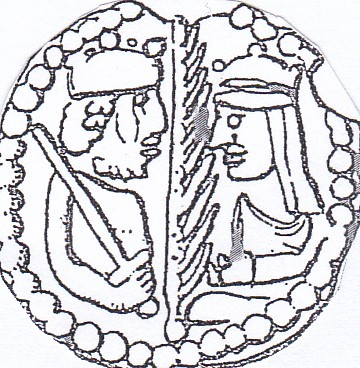
- 1157 bracteate depicting Valdemar and his wife, Sophia

King of Denmark
- Reign: 1154 – 12 May 1182
- Predecessor: Sweyn III; Canute V
- Successor: Canute VI
- Co-kings: Canute V; Sweyn III (until 1157)
- Born: 14 January 1131
- Died: 12 May 1182 (aged 51); Vordingborg Castle, Vordingborg, Denmark
- Burial: St. Bendt's Church, Ringsted, Denmark
- Consort: Sophia of Minsk
- Issue Detail: Sophia, Countess of Weimar-Orlamünde; Canute VI, King of Denmark; Maria; Margaret; Valdemar II, King of Denmark; Ingeborg, Queen of France; Helena, Duchess of Brunswick-Lüneburg; Rikissa, Queen of Sweden; Walburgis, Duchess of Pomerania
Names
- Valdemar Knudsen
- House: Estridsen
- Father: Canute Lavard, Duke of Schleswig
- Mother: Ingeborg of Kiev

Valdemar I Knudsen (14 January 1131 – 12 May 1182), also known as Valdemar the Great (Danish: Valdemar den Store), was King of Denmark from 1154 until his death in 1182. The reign of King Valdemar I saw the rise of Denmark, which reached its medieval zenith under his son King Valdemar II.

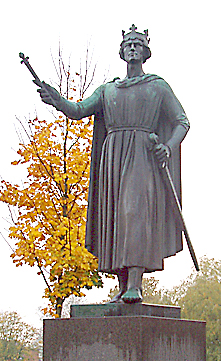
Valdemar den Store statue in Ringsted

== Childhood ==
Valdemar was the son of Canute Lavard, Duke of Schleswig, the chivalrous and popular eldest son of King Eric I of Denmark. Valdemar's father was murdered by Magnus Nielsen days before the birth of Valdemar; his mother, Ingeborg of Kiev, daughter of Grand Prince Mstislav I of Kiev and Christina Ingesdotter of Sweden, named him after her grandfather, Grand Prince Vladimir Monomakh of Kiev.

Valdemar was raised at Ringsted in the court of Danish nobleman Asser Rig of Fjenneslev (c. 1080–1151). Asser was a member of the Hvide noble family and had been raised together with Valdemar's father Canute Lavard. In their youth, Asser and Canute swore eternal brotherhood by performing the bloodbrother ritual. When Valdemar later arrived in Denmark Asser took him in and raised him together with Asser's sons, including Absalon (c. 1128–1201), who would become an archbishop and go to battle with Valdemar, and Esbern Snare (1127–1204), who was a royal chancellor and crusader. Esbern and Absalon became fosterbrothers to Valdemar, and like their fathers, Asser and Canute, Absalon and Valdemar became blood brothers. Together, they would form a brotherly alliance that came to dominate Denmark.

== Struggle for the throne ==
In 1146, when Valdemar was fifteen years old, King Eric III of Denmark abdicated and a civil war erupted. Valdemar was a possible contender to the throne. The other pretenders to the throne were: Sweyn III Grathe, the son of King Eric II of Denmark, and Canute V, the son of Magnus Nielsen, both of whom declared themselves King of Denmark in 1146. The civil war lasted the better part of ten years. In 1154, Valdemar joined with Canute and was recognized as co-king along with Canute. In July 1157, a temporary compromise was struck in which the three agreed to divide the country among themselves as co-regents in shifting alliances.

Canute was killed at the Bloodfeast of Roskilde in August 1157. Sweyn was defeated by Valdemar in the Battle of Grathe Heath (Slaget på Grathe Hede) on 23 October 1157. Sweyn was killed during flight, supposedly by a group of peasants who stumbled upon him as he was fleeing from the battlefield. Valdemar, having outlived all his rival pretenders, became the sole king of Denmark.

== Sole reign ==
In 1158, Absalon was elected bishop of Roskilde, and King Valdemar made him his chief advisor. The king reorganized and rebuilt war-torn Denmark. He strengthened the Dannevirke fortifications to the south, He built Sønderborg Castle as a fortified fortress, constructed on an islet in the Als Strait that later was connected to Als Island. He reinvented Viking raiding tactics of old to deal with the Wends to the south, which was now optimized for heavy cavalry; this use of amphibious assault was further improved upon by his successor Canute VI.

At Absalon's instigation, he declared war upon the Wends who were raiding the Danish coasts. They occupied Pomerania and the island of Rügen in the Baltic Sea and were a definite threat to the Danes in the Baltic as the Wends outnumbered the Danes more than two to one. So the Danes soon began raiding the Wendish coasts in turn; this culminated in the conquest of Rügen, which was used as another base to raid and later conquer more Wendish territory. Danish influence had therefore reached both Pomerania and the Obotrite confederacy, both being raided routinely by the Danes. Around the year 1170, a smaller contingent of the Danish fleet (headed by Valdemar and Absalon) ventured past the mouth of the Oder, where they were ambushed by a Wendish army and fleet under Casimir, at the Julin bridge (modern-day Wolin) hoping to end Danish raiding. But the Danes outsmarted the Wends and smashed their army and fleet, primarily due to the Danish ships also carrying cavalry. In 1175, King Valdemar built Vordingborg Castle as a defensive fortress and as a base from which to launch further raids against the German coast.

In 1180, as unrest spread throughout the rich province of Scania, the people demanded that Valdemar replace the "foreign" governors from Jutland, and instead install nobility from one of the 'Skåneland' provinces who traditionally ruled them. They also completely refused to pay church tithes. When Valdemar refused their demands, they rose up, saying they would pay neither taxes nor church tithes. Their numbers were so large that Valdemar not only gathered his own levies but also levies from Blekinge. The armies met at the Battle of Dysiaa, where Valdemar crushed them, and after this they once more paid taxes. But even though the entire peasant force surrendered, they still refused to pay tithes, so instead Valdemar had them bring generous gifts and donations to the church. They would pay no tithes but they would pay nonetheless, the only point he conceded were the governors, who were replaced by Scanians. This concession to the Scanians, that a Jute rules in Jutland and Rugian in Rügen, was then optimized for the rest of the Danish realm. This assisted immensely with keeping the peace within the kingdom, and the later extended realm.

== Issue ==
Valdemar married Sophia of Minsk (c. 1141–1198), the daughter of Richeza of Poland, dowager queen of Sweden, from her marriage to Prince Volodar of Minsk. She was the half-sister of King Canute V of Denmark. Valdemar and Sophia had the following children:

- Sophia (1159–1208), married Siegfried III, Count of Weimar-Orlamünde.
- Canute VI of Denmark (1163–1202)
- Maria (born c. 1165), became a nun at Roskilde (1188).
- Margaret (c. 1167 – c. 1205), became a nun at Roskilde (1188).
- Valdemar II of Denmark (1170–1241)
- Ingeborg (1174–1237), married King Philip II of France.
- Helena (c.1176 – 1233), married William, Duke of Brunswick-Lüneburg.
- Rikissa (c.1178 – 1220), married King Erik Knutsson of Sweden.
- Walburgis (d. 1177), married Bogusław I, Duke of Pomerania.

After Valdemar's death, Sophia married Landgrave Louis III of Thuringia.

== Notes ==
Valdemar the Great House of Estridsen Born: 14 January 1131 Died: 12 May 1182
Regnal titles
Preceded by Eric III	King of Denmark; 1154–1182 with Sweyn III (1146–1157); Canute V (1146–1157)	Succeeded by Canute VI
Vacant Title last held by Magnus	Duke in Southern Jutland ca. 1152–1154	Vacant Title next held by Christopher
