= Sophia of Minsk =

Queen of Denmark from 1157 to 1182

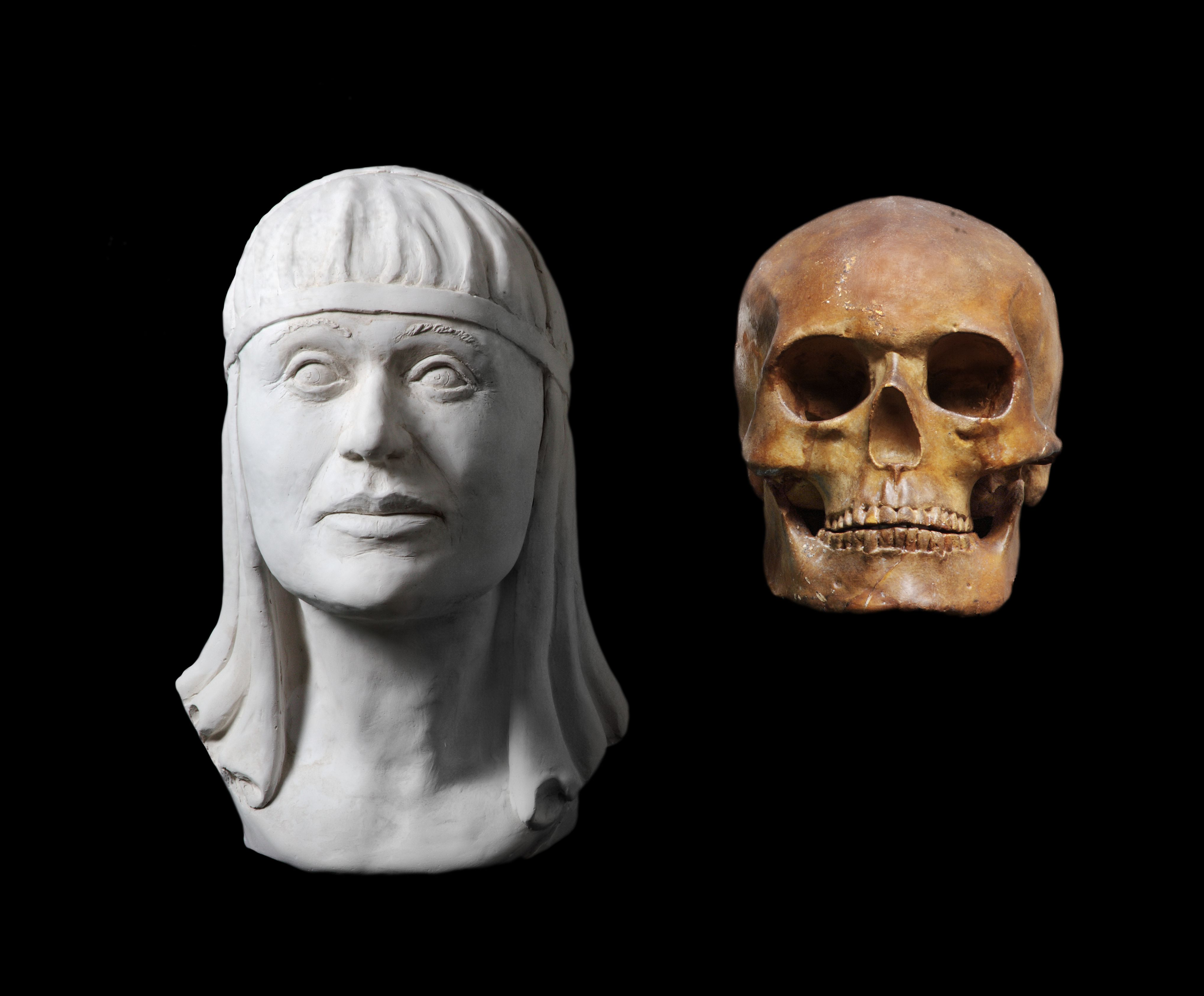

Queen consort of Denmark
- Tenure: 1157–1182
- Died: 5 May 1198
- Burial: St. Bendt's Church
- Spouses: Valdemar I of Denmark (m. 1157; died 1182) Louis III, Landgrave of Thuringia (m. 1184; died 1190)
- Issue among others...: Canute VI, King of Denmark; Valdemar II, King of Denmark; Ingeborg, Queen of France; Helena, Duchess of Lüneburg; Rikissa, Queen of Sweden
- House: Rurik
- Father: Volodar of Minsk
- Mother: Richeza of Poland

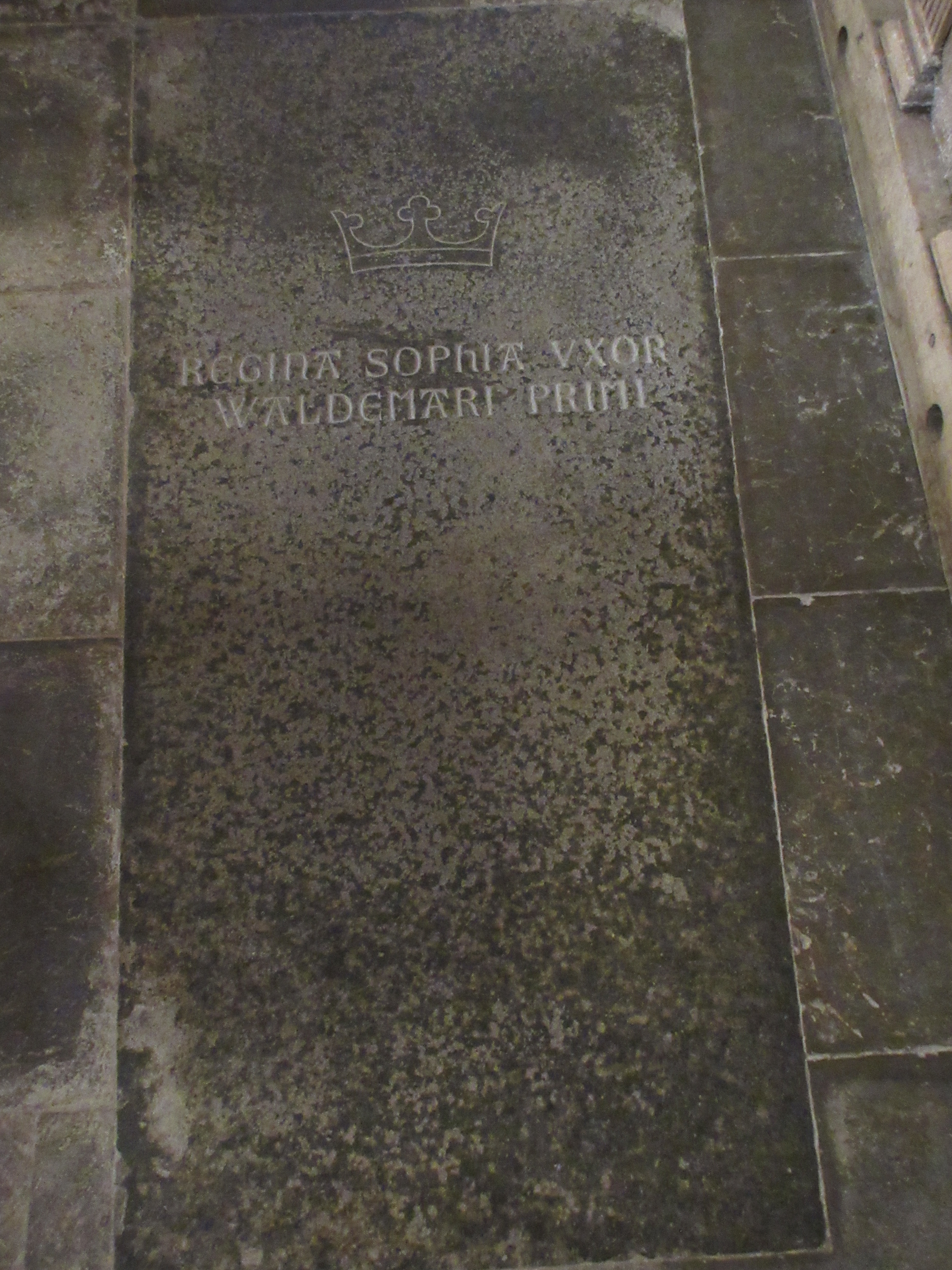
Gravestone for Queen Sophia in St. Bendt's Church in Ringsted.

Sophia of Minsk or Sophia of Polotsk (died 5 May 1198) was a Danish queen consort by marriage to King Valdemar I of Denmark, and a landgravine of Thuringia by marriage to Louis III, Landgrave of Thuringia.

== Life ==
=== Origin ===
Sophia was the daughter of Richeza of Poland, Dowager Queen of Sweden, from her second marriage to a man called "Valador", King in Poloni Land. The identity of her father is uncertain, it was either Volodar of Minsk or Vladimir Vsevolodich, Prince of Novgorod and son of Vsevolod of Pskov. Both of them were Rurikids. The latter version would mean Valdemar was married to his first cousin once removed, as Sophia's possible father Volodar was a nephew of Valdemar's mother Ingeborg of Kiev.

=== Childhood ===
Sophia spent a part of her childhood in Denmark, where her mother had been married to a Danish prince in her first marriage, and returned with her daughter when her second marriage was terminated. Sophia was the half sister of Canute V of Denmark, the son of her mother by her first marriage: after her half brother became king of Denmark in 1146, her mother returned to Denmark with her daughter Sophia, who thus spent part of her childhood in Denmark at the court of her half brother the king.

In circa 1149, her mother married Sverker I of Sweden, in her third marriage. She took her daughter with her to Sweden, where Sophia subsequently spent the rest of her childhood at the Swedish royal court.

=== Queen ===
In 1154, at the age of circa fourteen, Sophia was betrothed to Valdemar as a symbol of alliance between Sweden and Denmark: she was at this time described as a pretty girl with promise of becoming a beauty. In the marriage contract, she was secured an eighth of her half brother King Canute V's estates in Denmark.

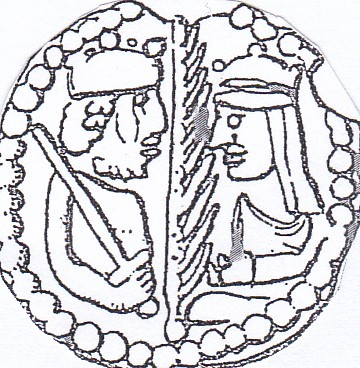
1157 bracteate commemorating the wedding of Valdemar and Sophia of Minsk

Sophia departed Sweden for Denmark after the conclusion of the engagement in 1154, but as she was not yet regarded old enough to marry by Nordic standards, she was sent to reside with a foster mother named Bodil until she was old enough to live with Valdemar.

The wedding between Sophia and Valdemar was conducted in Viborg in 1157, three years later.

Queen Sophia was described as beautiful, dominant and cruel. According to traditional myth, she murdered Valdemar's mistress Tove and injured his sister Kirsten, but this is not confirmed.

She was widowed in 1182.

=== Later life ===
As queen dowager, Sophia received a proposal from, and married, Louis III, Landgrave of Thuringia in about 1184, and was escorted to the border by her son and a grand entourage.

She was repudiated in 1190, and returned to Denmark.

== Issue ==
Sophia had the following children with Valdemar I of Denmark:

- Sophia (1159–1208), married Siegfried III, Count of Weimar-Orlamünde
- King Canute VI of Denmark (1163–1202)
- Maria (born c. 1165), nun at Roskilde (1188)
- Margaret (born c. 1167), nun at Roskilde (1188)
- King Valdemar II of Denmark (1170–1241)
- Ingeborg (1175–1236), married King Philip II of France
- Helena (c.1177–1233), married William of Lüneburg
- Rikissa of Denmark (c. 1180–1220), married King Eric X of Sweden

Sophia of Minsk Rurik Born: circa 1140 Died: 5 May 1198
Danish royalty
| Preceded by Helena of Sweden | Queen consort of Denmark; 1157–1182 | Succeeded by Gertrude of Bavaria |
