= Matilda of England, Duchess of Saxony =

Duchess of Saxony and Bavaria from 1168 to 1180

Matilda
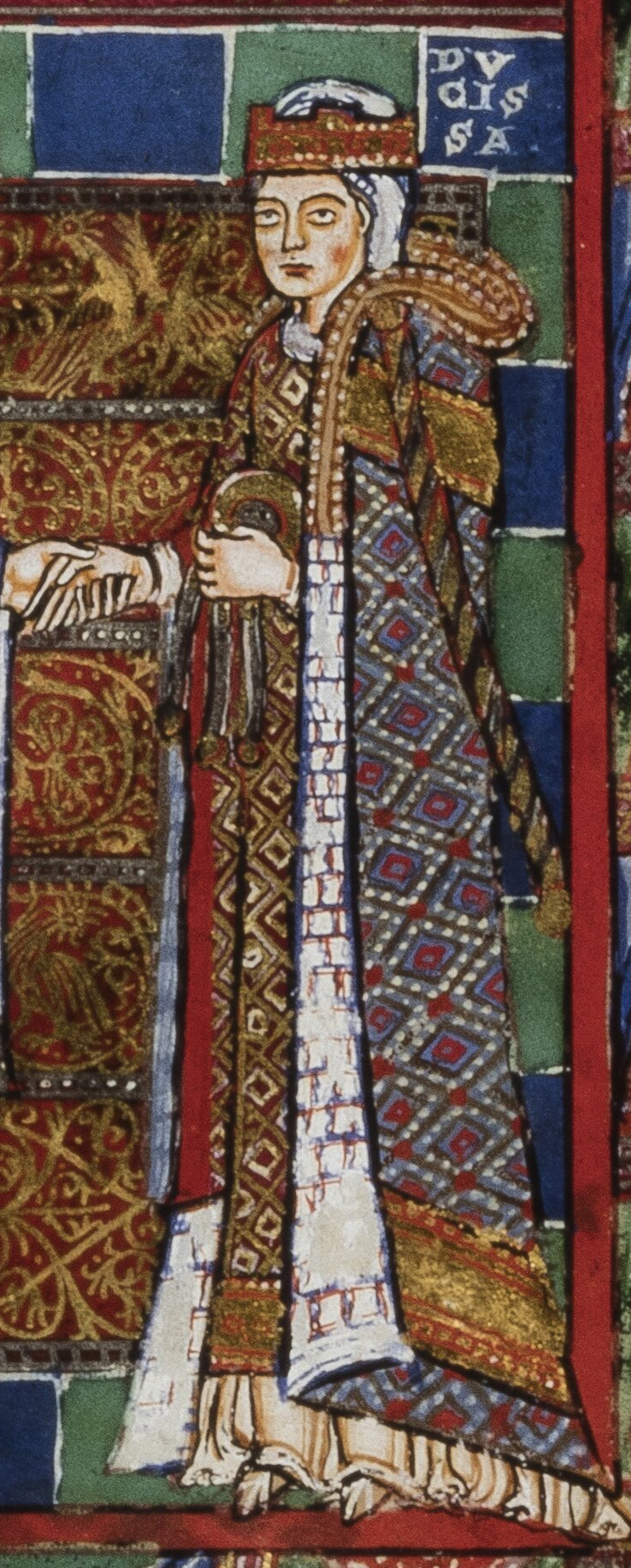
- Matilda depicted at her wedding in the Gospels of Henry the Lion

Duchess consort of Saxony and Bavaria
- Tenure: 1 February 1168 – 1180
- Born: June 1156; London, England
- Died: June/July 1189 (aged 32–33); Brunswick, Duchy of Saxony
- Burial: Brunswick Cathedral, Lower Saxony
- Spouse: Henry the Lion (m. 1168)
- Issue: Matilda, Countess of Perche; Henry V, Count Palatine of the Rhine; Lothair; Otto IV, Holy Roman Emperor; William, Lord of Lüneburg
- House: Plantagenet-Angevin (Note: Historians are divided in their use of the terms Plantagenet and Angevin in regard to Henry II and his children. Some class Henry II to be the first Plantagenet king of England; others refer to Henry II, Richard I, and John as the Angevin dynasty, and consider Henry III to be the first Plantagenet ruler.)
- Father: Henry II of England
- Mother: Eleanor of Aquitaine

Matilda of England (June 1156 – June/July 1189) was an English princess of the House of Plantagenet (Note: Historians are divided in their use of the terms "Plantagenet" and "Angevin" in regards to Henry II and his sons. Some class Henry II to be the first Plantagenet King of England; others refer to Henry, Richard and John as the Angevin dynasty, and consider Henry III to be the first Plantagenet ruler.) and by marriage Duchess consort of Saxony and Bavaria from 1168 until her husband's deposition in 1180.

== Life ==
Matilda was born in or around June 1156 in London or, less likely, at Windsor Castle, as third child and eldest daughter of King Henry II of England and Eleanor of Aquitaine; named after her paternal grandmother, Empress Matilda, she was baptized shortly after birth in Holy Trinity Priory by Theobald of Bec, Archbishop of Canterbury. In 1160, Queen Eleanor and her daughter joined the King who was in Normandy and stayed there presumably until 1163.

Upon the disputed Papal election of 1159 and the succeeding schism, King Henry II established closer ties to the Holy Roman Empire, particularly when he himself came into conflict with the English clergy led by Thomas Becket, Archbishop of Canterbury; this was reflected at the beginning of 1165, when Frederick I, Holy Roman Emperor sent an embassy led by Rainald of Dassel, Archbishop of Cologne to the English court, with the purpose of arranging a double marriage between the two daughters of Henry II, Matilda and Eleanor, with the Emperor's son Frederick V, Duke of Swabia and Henry the Lion, Duke of Saxony (the Emperor's cousin and one of the most powerful German princes of his time) respectively. There was conflict during the negotiations, however, when Robert de Beaumont, 2nd Earl of Leicester refused to greet the German archbishop, alleging him to be a schismatic and a supporter of the anti-pope, Victor IV.

It was not possible to immediately agree on the marriage of Eleanor with the Duke of Swabia, but a decision was made about an alliance between the Duke of Saxony and Matilda, who at the time of negotiations was staying with her mother in Normandy and returned to England only in autumn 1166; there is also a version that Matilda was originally chosen as the wife of the Emperor's son and not her sister, but it was not possible to agree on the marriage. Preparations for the wedding began shortly after Matilda's return and the departure of the embassy, which is probably recorded in the register of English knights-tenants and their possessions, contained in the "red" and "black" books of the treasury, and drawn up in order to assess the aid collected by the King for the marriage of his daughter. At the beginning of 1167, the Duke of Saxony sent an embassy to deliver the bride to him; Matilda, accompanied by her mother, sailed from Dover to Normandy on Michael's Day (29 September), and from there, probably after Christmas, set off for Germany. Henry the Lion met his bride in Minden, where they were married in the local Cathedral by Bishop Werner on 1 February 1168.

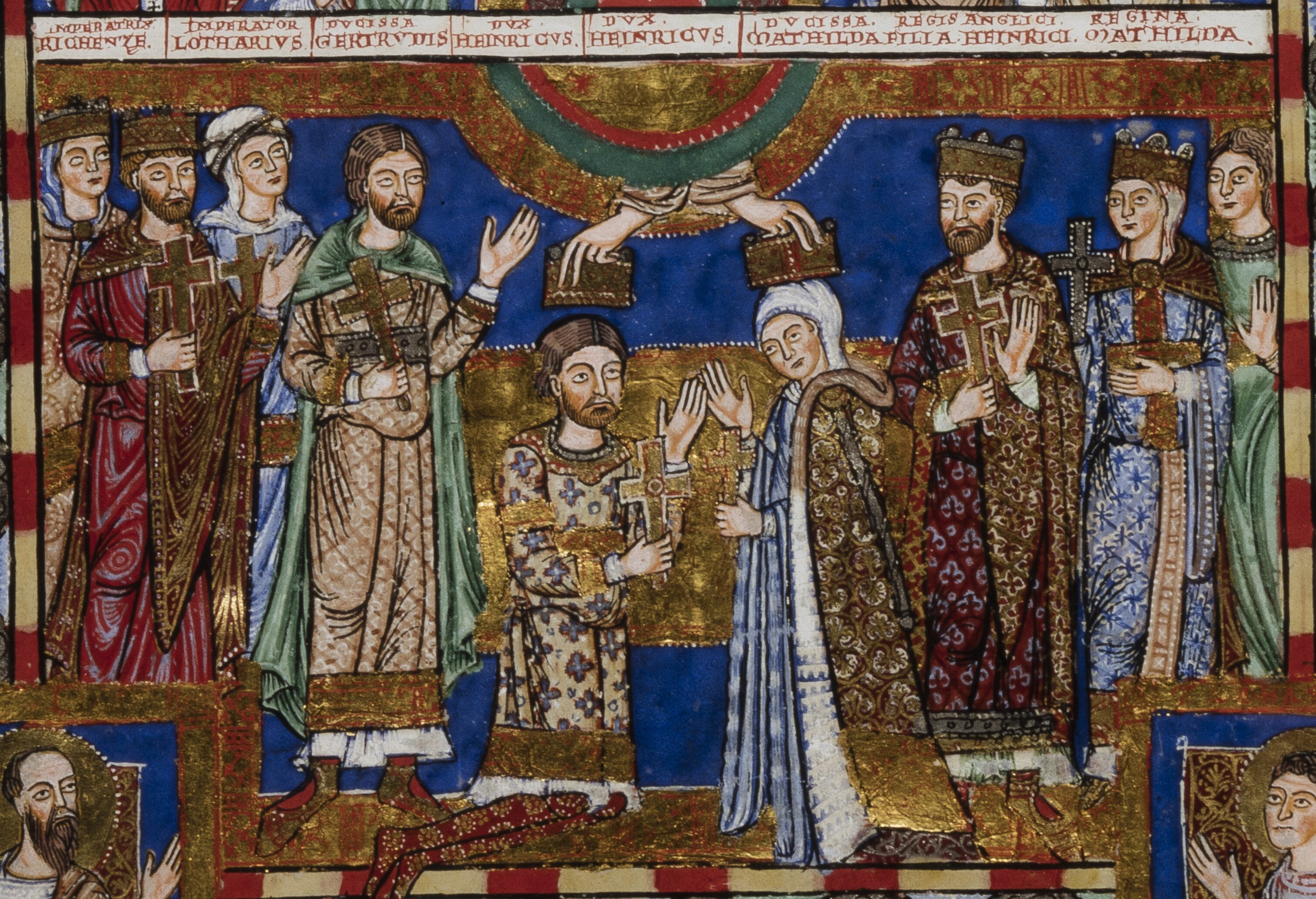
Coronation of Henry the Lion and Matilda, from the Gospels of Henry the Lion (c. 1188)

Matilda's husband was 27 years older than her and had been already married long before her birth: Henry the Lion divorced from his first wife, Clementia of Zähringen, in 1162. As the ruling Duke of Bavaria, Saxony and Brunswick, reportedly everything belonged to him "from the Elbe to the Rhine, from the Harz to the sea". The official residence of the Duke was located in Brunswick, where the newlyweds had a wedding feast. In Brunswick, the first child of Matilda and Henry the Lion, a daughter, was born in 1172 during the absence of her father, who was on a pilgrimage to the Holy Land. The daughter was named Richenza after her paternal grandmother Richenza of Northeim. In the following years Matilda became the mother of at least four more children. James Panton writes that in the early years of marriage, despite her youth, Matilda ruled the vast estates of her husband in his absence. After Henry returned to Germany, he held, with his wife, a magnificent court at Dankwarderode Castle. They had Brunswick Cathedral erected from 1173 onwards and initiated the Lucidarius, the first original German-language work in prose, as well as the Gospels of Henry the Lion, a masterpiece of Romanesque book illumination.

In 1180, the latent conflict that had arisen a few years earlier between Henry the Lion and Emperor Frederick I finally reached its climax when the Duke of Saxony was tried in absentia for insubordination by a court of bishops and princes at Würzburg in 1180 and stripped of his lands and declared an outlaw. The reason for the conflict was the refusal of Henry the Lion in 1174 to go with the Emperor on an expedition to the Duchy of Normandy — a domain belonging to Matilda's father; when the campaign failed, the Emperor bitterly blamed this on Henry the Lion, who refused to support his overlord, and declared that that Imperial law overruled traditional German law. Henry the Lion refused to submit, and the Emperor laid siege to Brunswick, within the walls of which Matilda had just given birth to her second son, named Lothair. She addressed the emperor as a knight, but he only sent Matilda a keg of wine and continued the siege. At the end of November 1181, Henry the Lion finally obeyed the Imperial decision and left the country for three years. Emperor Frederick I provided Matilda with income from the lands that she would have received as a widow, and invited her to stay in one of the castles located on these lands, but she decided to go into exile to the court of her father with her husband. In exile, Matilda and Henry the Lion were accompanied by their children, except one of the youngest, Lothair, who remained in Germany as hostage.

In the summer of 1182, the couple reached Argentan in Normandy, where Matilda probably gave birth a son who died shortly after; during their stay there, she became acquainted with the troubadour Bertran de Born, who, calling her "Elena" or "Lana", made Matilda the object of his desire in two of his poems of "courtly love". On 12 June 1184, Matilda left for England, where in the same year in Winchester she gave birth to another son, named William. In November, Matilda was in London with her husband and they celebrated Christmas in Windsor with the English royal family. In 1185, when the three-year term of banishment of Henry the Lion ended, King Henry II achieved the restitution of the allodial lands of Brunswick for his daughter and her family, after which Matilda returned there with her husband and children. In the spring of 1189, the Emperor ordered Henry the Lion either to accompany him on the Third Crusade or go into exile before his return, and he chose exile: he went to the court of his father-in-law, while Matilda and her children remained in Brunswick to defend the interests of her husband, where she died, according to various sources, on 8 June, 20 June, 28 June, 3 July or 13 July 1189 and was buried in Brunswick Cathedral.

Henry the Lion returned to Brunswick after the death of Emperor Frederick I in 1191 and himself died in 1195, wishing to rest on the right hand of his wife in order to "sleep next to her both in life and in death". The people of Henry the Lion revered his wife as “a most religious woman, whose memory is of note before God and man, whose good deeds and sweet disposition enhanced the lustre of the royal family from which she sprang; a woman of profound piety, of wondrous sympathy for the afflicted, of much almsgiving and many prayers”.

== Issue ==
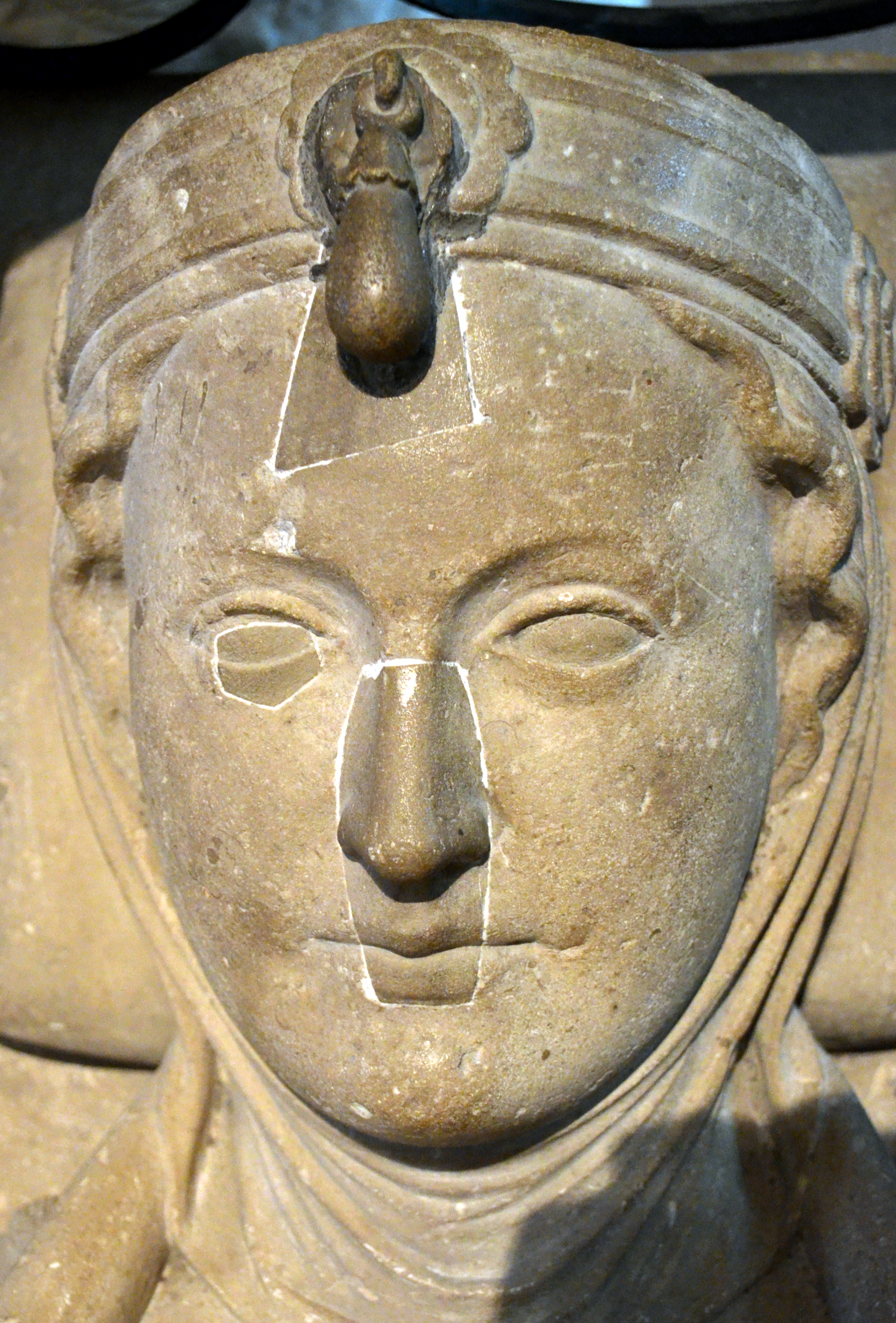
Head of a funerary statue of Matilda in Brunswick Cathedral

Sources are at variance concerning Matilda and Henry the Lion's children, including their exact number, their names, and their birth order: Alison Weir reports ten children of the ducal couple, while Thelma Anna Leese lists only five. Kate Norgate, author of the article about Matilda in the Dictionary of National Biography, reports on the birth of six children by Matilda: a daughter and five sons. James Panton also writes about the birth of six children by Matilda.

Following nearly contemporary sources (including Arnoldi Chronica Slavorum, Chronicon Montis Serreni and Chronicon Sancti Michaelis Luneburgensis), five children are certainly documented as offspring of Matilda and Henry the Lion:

- Richenza (1172 – 13 January 1209/10), first-born child and daughter; she accompanied her parents into exile, after which she was known as Matilda, assuming that this refers to the same daughter, but the question is not beyond all doubt as it is not clear what would have prompted her name change. Betrothed in 1184 to William the Lion, King of Scotland, but the engagement was abandoned because the Pope refused a dispensation on grounds of consanguinity; married firstly in 1189 to Geoffrey III, Count of Perche and secondly in 1204 to Enguerrand III, Lord of Coucy.
- Henry (1173/1174 – 28 April 1227), named after his father and probably also after his maternal grandfather King Henry II of England; he campaigned with King Henry VI of Germany in Italy in 1190, but deserted in southern Italy and was outlawed at Worms in May 1192 and only restored to favour in January 1194 at Würzburg following his marriage. Inherited Brunswick after his father's death in 1195 and became Count Palatine of the Rhine jure uxoris in the same year. Married secretly between December 1193/January 1194 to Agnes of Hohenstaufen, heiress of the County Palatine of the Rhine and first cousin of Emperor Henry VI; thanks to this union, the long-feud between the Houses of Welf and Hohenstaufen was finally settled.
- Lothair (1174/1175 – 15 October 1190). He remained in Saxony when his parents went in exile to England in 1182 as hostage to Henry VI King of the Romans to guarantee his father's agreement to the terms of his banishment and later as a guarantee of Henry the Lion's performance with the peace terms agreed at Fulda in July 1190. He died in adolescence while still a hostage.
- Otto (1175/1176 – 19 May 1218), Count of Poitiers and Earl of York, and later, as Otto IV, King of Germany and Holy Roman Emperor. Married firstly on 23 July 1212 to Beatrice, eldest daughter of his enemy and rival King Philip of Swabia and secondly on 19 May 1214 to Maria of Brabant.
- William (July 1184 – 12 December 1213), Lord of Lüneburg. Married Helena of Denmark. All subsequent Dukes of Brunswick and Luneburg, as well as the current British royal house, descended from them. Also there is a direct line from William to the current King of Denmark, Frederik X.

== Sources ==
- Diggelmann, Lindsay (2005). "Exile and the Poetic Standpoint of the Troubadour Bertran de Born". Parergon. 22. Australian and New Zealand Association of Medieval and Early Modern Studies (Inc.): 1–16. doi:10.1353/pgn.2005.0018. S2CID 145553555.
- Hamilton, J.S. (2010). The Plantagenets: History of a Dynasty. London: Continuum. ISBN 978-1-4411-5712-6. OL 28013041M.
- Jordan, Karl (1986). Henry the Lion: A Biography. Falla, P. S. (trans.). Oxford: Clarendon Press. ISBN 978-0198219699.
- Leese, Thelma Anna (1996). Blood Royal: Issue of the Kings and Queens of Medieval England, 1066-1399 : the Normans and Plantagenets. Heritage Books. ISBN 978-0788405259.
- Norgate, Kate Norgate (1894). "Matilda (1156-1189)" . In Lee, Sidney (ed.). Dictionary of National Biography. Vol. 37. London: Smith, Elder & Co. pp. 58–59.
- Weir, Alison (2011). Britain's Royal Families: The Complete Genealogy. Random House. pp. 62–63. ISBN 978-0810874978.
- Wheeler, Bonnie; Parsons, John Carmi (2008). Eleanor of Aquitaine : Lord and Lady (The New Middle Ages). Palgrave Macmillan. ISBN 978-0230602366.
- Panton, James (2011). Historical Dictionary of the British Monarchy. Scarecrow Press. p. 342. ISBN 978-0810874978.

Matilda of England, Duchess of Saxony House of Plantagenet Cadet branch of the House of Anjou Born: c. 1156 Died: 13 July 1189
German royalty
Vacant Title last held by Clementia of Zähringen	Duchess consort of Saxony; 1168–1180	Succeeded by Judith of Poland
Vacant Title last held by Clementia of Zähringen	Duchess consort of Bavaria; 1168–1180	Vacant Title next held by Agnes of Loon
