= Helena of Denmark =

Helena
- Lady of Lüneburg
- Born: c. 1180
- Died: 22 November 1233; Lüneburg
- Burial: Benedictine monastery of St. Michael in Lüneburg
- Spouse: William of Winchester
- Issue: Otto I, Duke of Brunswick-Lüneburg
- House: Estridsen
- Father: Valdemar I of Denmark
- Mother: Sophia of Minsk

Princess Helena of Denmark (also Helene Valdemarsdatter) (c. 1180 – 22 November 1233 in Lüneburg) was heiress of Garding and Lady of Lüneburg.

Helena was daughter of Valdemar I of Denmark and Sophia of Minsk and sister of Ingeborg of Denmark, Queen of France.

In her youth, she was betrothed to a son of Frederick I Barbarossa. In 1184, the marriage was reportedly cancelled after her brother, Canute IV, refused to swear fealty to the Emperor.

In the summer of 1202 in Hamburg, Helena married Lord William of Lüneburg. Helena and William had a son, the future Duke, Otto I, The Child. After the early death of her husband, Duke William, in 1213, his brother, Emperor Otto IV, took over the reign of Lüneburg, as regent for Otto the Child. Otto was appointed heir of the allodial property of the Guelphs by his uncle Henry the Elder.

Helena died in 1233 and was buried in the Benedictine monastery of St. Michael in Lüneburg.
