= Louis III of Thuringia =

Landgrave of Thuringia from 1172 to 1190

Louis III, Landgrave of Thuringia
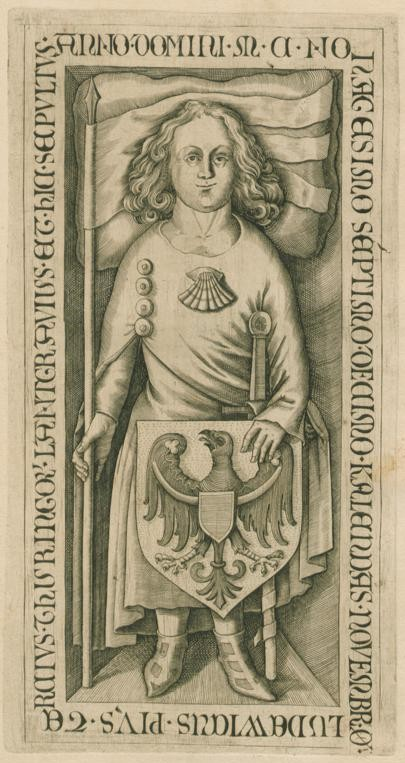
- Grave plate of Louis III, Landgrave of Thuringia
- Born: 1151 or 1152
- Died: 16 October 1190; Eastern Mediterranean Sea, near Cyprus
- Buried: Reinhardsbrunn
- Noble family: Ludovingians
- Spouses: Margaret of Cleves; Sophia of Minsk
- Father: Louis II, Landgrave of Thuringia
- Mother: Judith of Hohenstaufen

Louis III, nicknamed Louis the Pious or Louis the Mild (1151/52 – 16 October 1190) was a member of the Ludowingians dynasty who ruled as Landgrave of Thuringia from 1172 until his death.

== Life ==
He was the eldest son of Landgrave Louis II and his wife Judith of Hohenstaufen. In 1172, he succeeded his father as Landgrave of Thuringia. His younger brother Henry Raspe III (not to be confused with the later anti-king Henry Raspe IV) inherited Hesse and the possessions on the Rhine.

Louis III by and large continued his father's policies. He fought feuds with the noble families in Thuringia and the rulers of neighbouring territories (including the House of Schwarzburg and the House of Ascania) and with the Archbishopric of Mainz. He was a nephew of Emperor Frederick Barbarossa and supported his policies. He stood initially on the side of Henry the Lion of the House of Welf. When Henry fell out with the Hohenstaufens in 1179, Louis sided with Henry's Saxon opponents. In 1180, he received the County Palatine of Saxony as a reward for this from the emperor. However, he gave the County Palatine to his brother Hermann I, Landgrave of Thuringia in 1181. In 1184 he was present when Henry VI held court at a Hoftag in the Petersberg Citadel in Erfurt, during which the floor collapsed and 60 attendees fell to their death in the latrine below (see Erfurt latrine disaster). Ludwig was one of the few survivors.

He participated in the Third Crusade. When the main army took the land route via the Balkans and Asia Minor, Louis III and his contingent embarked in Brindisi and sailed to Tyre. After arriving in the Holy Land, he participated in the siege of Acre. However, before Barbarossa arrived with the main army, Louis III fell ill and decided to return home. He died on a ship sailing to Cyprus. His entrails were buried on the island; his bones were transferred to the Reinhardsbrunn monastery. In the 14th century, his bones were reburied in the Church of St. George in Eisenach.

Louis III of Thuringia Ludowingians Born: 1151 or 1152 Died: 16 October 1190
Preceded by Louis II	Landgrave of Thuringia; 1172-1190	Succeeded by Herman I
Preceded by Adalbert	Count Palatine of Saxony; 1180-1181	Succeeded by Herman I
