= Brunswick Cathedral =

Coordinates: 52°15′51″N 10°31′27″E

- Collegiate Church of Saint Blaise and Saint John the Baptist
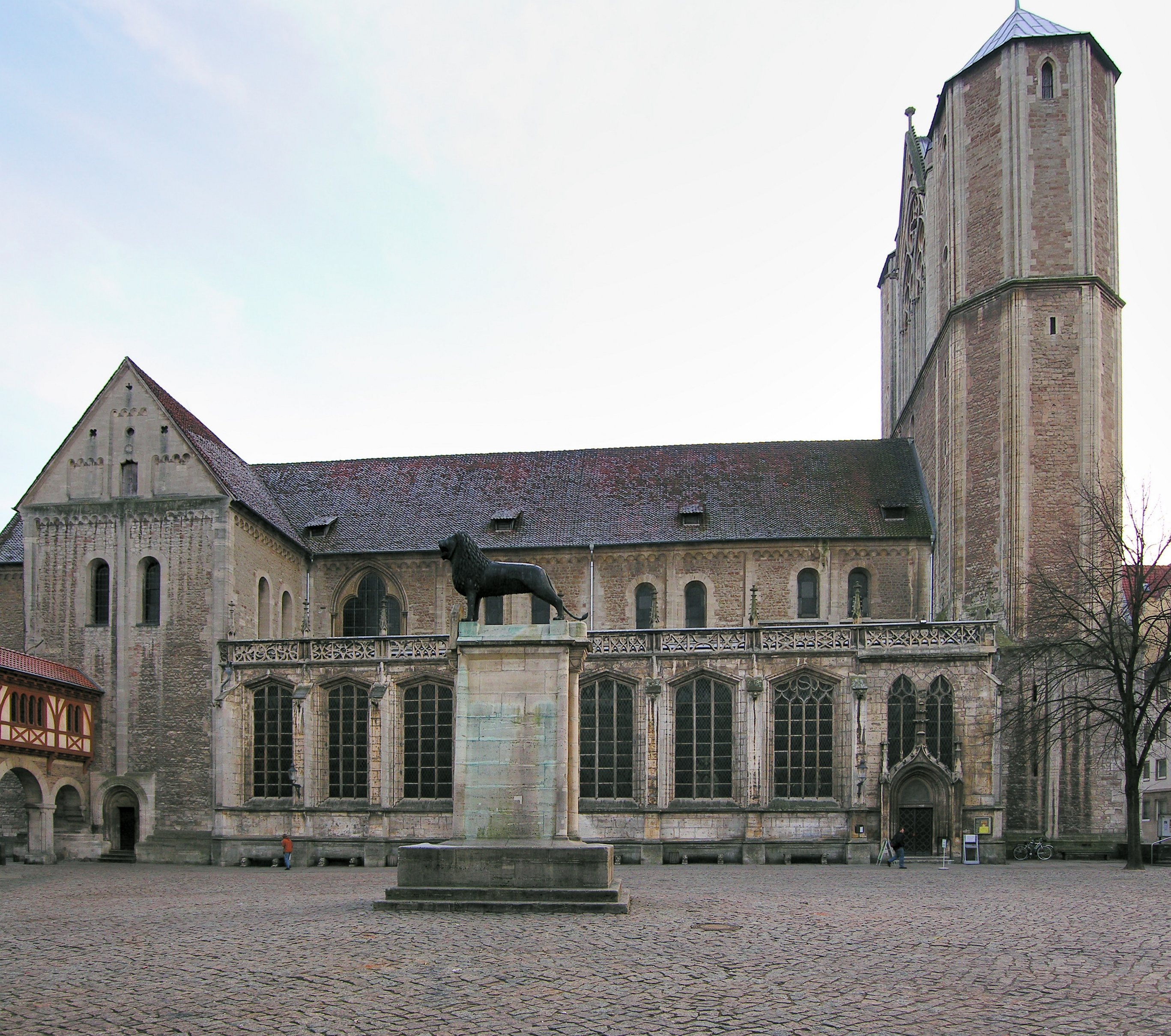
- Brunswick Cathedral
- Location: Braunschweig, Lower Saxony, Germany
- Denomination: Lutheran
- Previous denomination: Roman Catholic

History
- Dedication: Saint Blaise, John the Baptist and Thomas Becket
- Consecrated: 29 December 1226

Architecture
- Style: Romanesque
- Years built: 1173–1195

Brunswick Cathedral (German: Dom St. Blasii (et Johannis), lit. in English: Collegiate Church of Ss. Blaise and John the Baptist) is a large Lutheran church in the City of Braunschweig (Brunswick), Germany.

The church is termed Dom, in German a synecdoche - pars pro toto - used for cathedrals and collegiate churches alike, and much like the Italian duomo. It is currently owned and used by a congregation of the Lutheran Church in Brunswick.

== History ==
Henry the Lion established the original foundation as a collegiate church, built between 1173 and 1195. Among the most important pieces on display in the church are a wooden crucifix by Master Imervard dating from the second half of the 12th century and one of very few huge bronze candlesticks with seven arms, dating from around the 1170s.

The construction of the church was disrupted several times during the various exiles of Henry the Lion, so that he and his consort Matilda, Duchess of Saxony, were both buried in an unfinished church. The limestone statues of them on their tomb in the nave are an idealised representation made a generation after their death, between 1230 and 1240. The cathedral was consecrated on 29 December 1226, dedicated to Saints Blaise, John the Baptist and Thomas Becket. In 1543, at the time of the Protestant Reformation, the City of Brunswick, in opposition to Duke Henry V of Brunswick-Wolfenbüttel, joined the Schmalkaldic League, and the church came into Lutheran use. Its college was dissolved.

The cathedral is the burial place of Otto IV, Holy Roman Emperor (1175/76-1218) and Caroline of Brunswick, Queen Consort of George IV of the United Kingdom.

Until 1671, the cathedral held a medieval collection of ecclesiastical relics that later became known as the Welfenschatz (Guelph Treasure). In 2015, Germany declared 42 pieces of this collection a national treasure, under the name the Guelph Treasure. These relics are maintained by the foundation known as the Stiftung Preußischer Kulturbesitz (SPK), and displayed at the Bode-Museum in Berlin. The cathedral has lost possession of the collection in 1671 when the relics were removed by John Frederick, Duke of Brunswick-Lüneburg, Prince of Calenberg. Until 1803, a portion was housed at the court chapel at Hanover. In 1929, 82 relics were sold by Ernest Augustus, Duke of Brunswick to a consortium of German-Jewish art dealers. They in turn sold 40 pieces to mostly private collectors, except for nine that went to the Cleveland Museum of Art. The remaining 42 pieces were sold as a group in 1935. After the collection's designation as a national treasure in 2015, heirs of the art dealers brought common lawsuit(s) against Germany in U.S. courts in an attempt to recover perceived losses resulting from the 1935 sale. Germany's motion to dismiss on the basis of jurisdiction and conflicts with the Foreign Sovereign Immunities Act was denied once, then again in an appeal. Germany sought intervention by the US Supreme Court. The Supreme Court heard the case (FEDERAL REPUBLIC OF GERMANY ET AL. v. PHILIPP ET AL) in October 2020 and issued on 3 February 2021, an order that vacated and remanded the case back to US District Court.

== Burials ==
- Henry the Lion (1129–1195)
  - Matilda of England, Duchess of Saxony (1156–1189), his wife
- Egbert II, Margrave of Meissen (1060–1090)
  - Gertrude of Brunswick (1060–1117), his sister
- Otto IV, Holy Roman Emperor (1175/76-1218)
  - Empress Beatrice of Hohenstaufen (1198–1212), his wife
- Louis Rudolph, Duke of Brunswick-Lüneburg (1671–1735)
  - Princess Christine Louise of Oettingen-Oettingen (1671–1747), his wife
- Ferdinand Albert I, Duke of Brunswick-Lüneburg (1636–1687),
  - Ferdinand Albert II, Duke of Brunswick-Lüneburg (1680–1735), his son, Duke Louis Rudolph's son-in-law and successor
    - Charles I, Duke of Brunswick-Wolfenbüttel (1713–1780), his son
    - Duke Louis Ernest of Brunswick-Lüneburg (1718–1788), his brother, Captain-General of the Dutch Republic from 1750 to 1766
    - Duke Ferdinand of Brunswick (1721–1792), his brother, Prussian field marshal from 1758 to 1766
      - Charles William Ferdinand, Duke of Brunswick (1735–1806), Charles' I son, killed at the Battle of Jena-Auerstedt
        - Frederick William, Duke of Brunswick-Wolfenbüttel (1771–1815), his son, the Black Duke, killed at the Battle of Quatre Bras
          - William, Duke of Brunswick (1806–1884), his son, last descendant of the House of Brunswick-Bevern
- Caroline, Queen of the United Kingdom (Consort of George IV.)

== Gallery ==
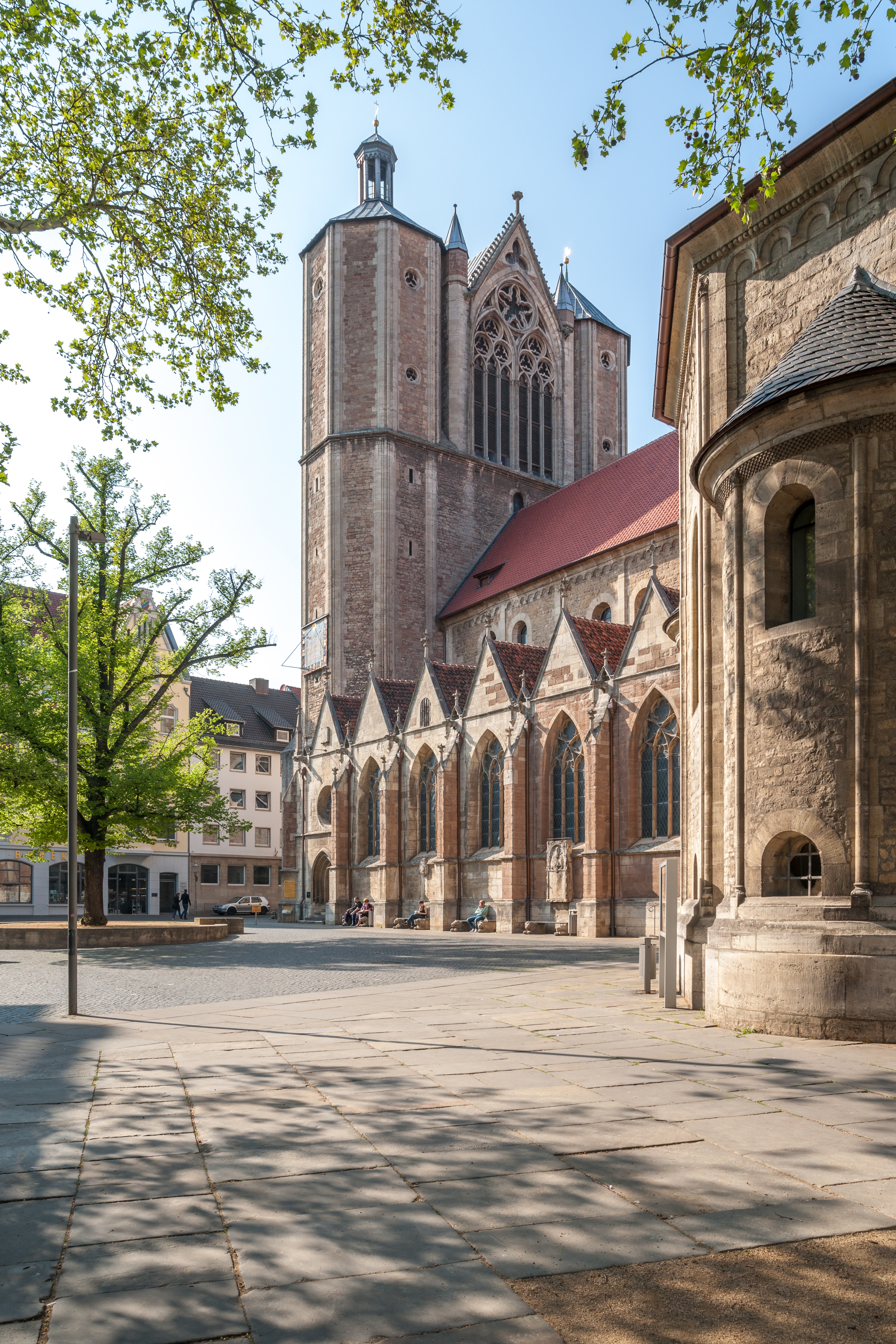
South side

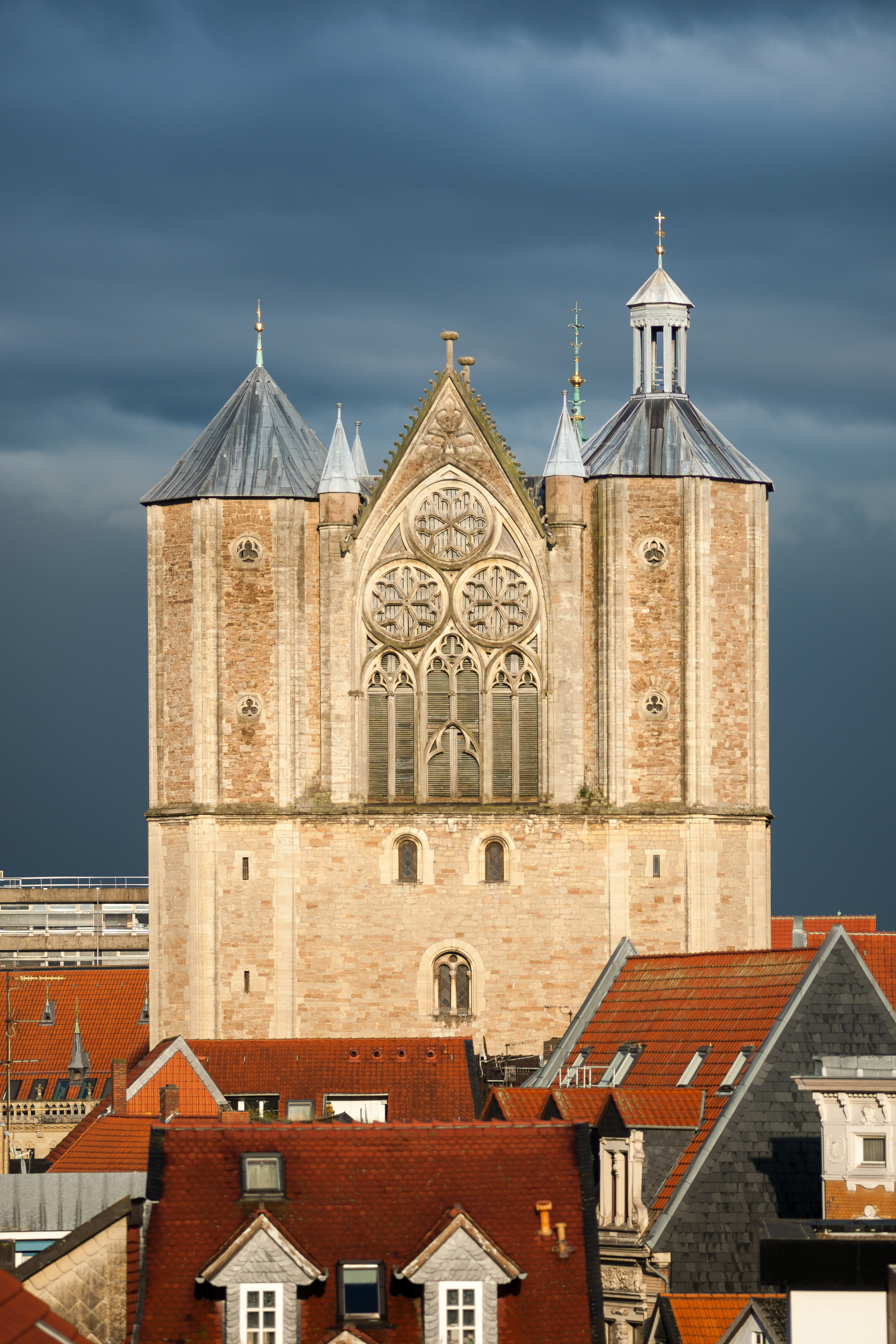
Westwork

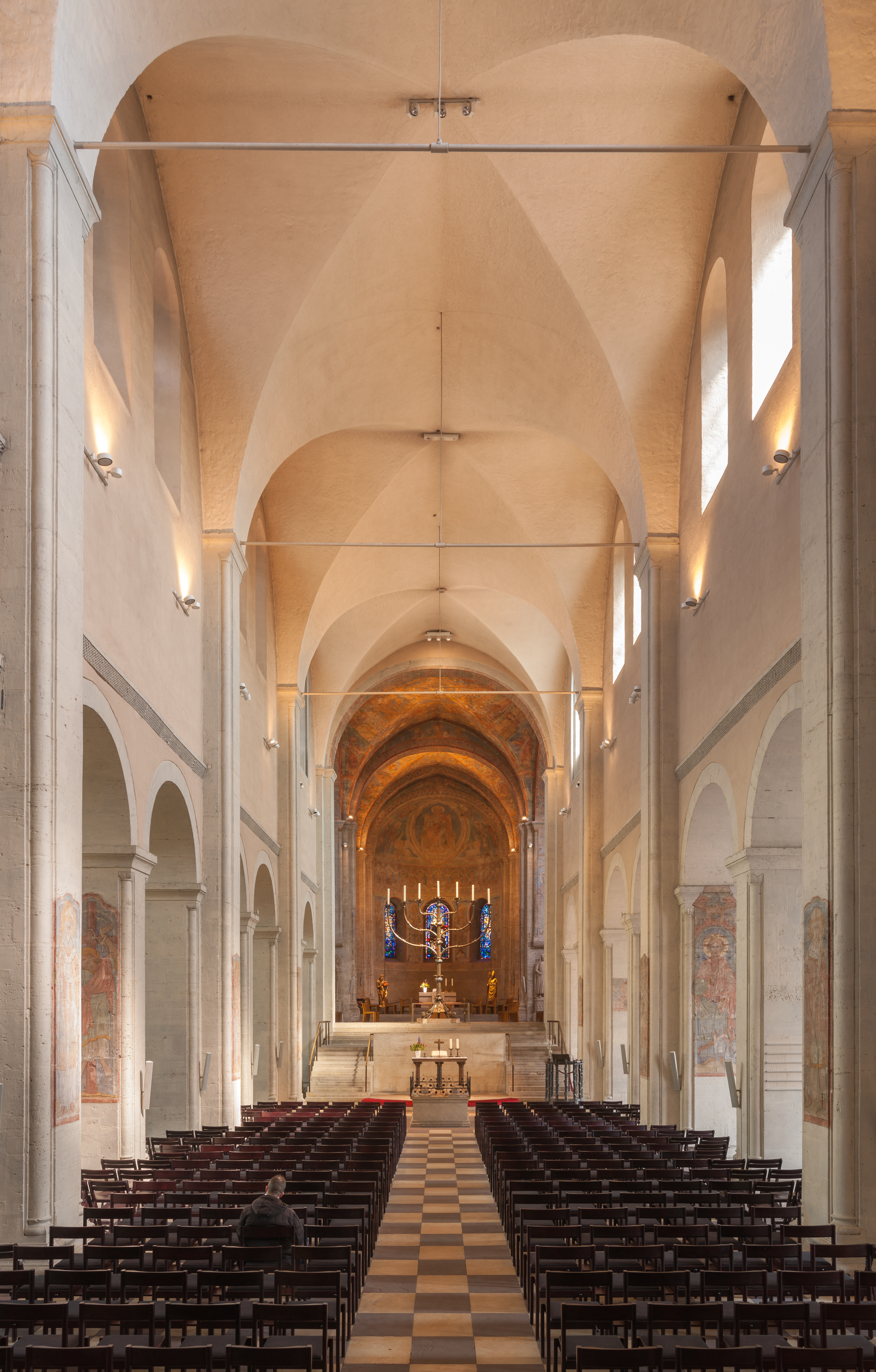
Central aisle

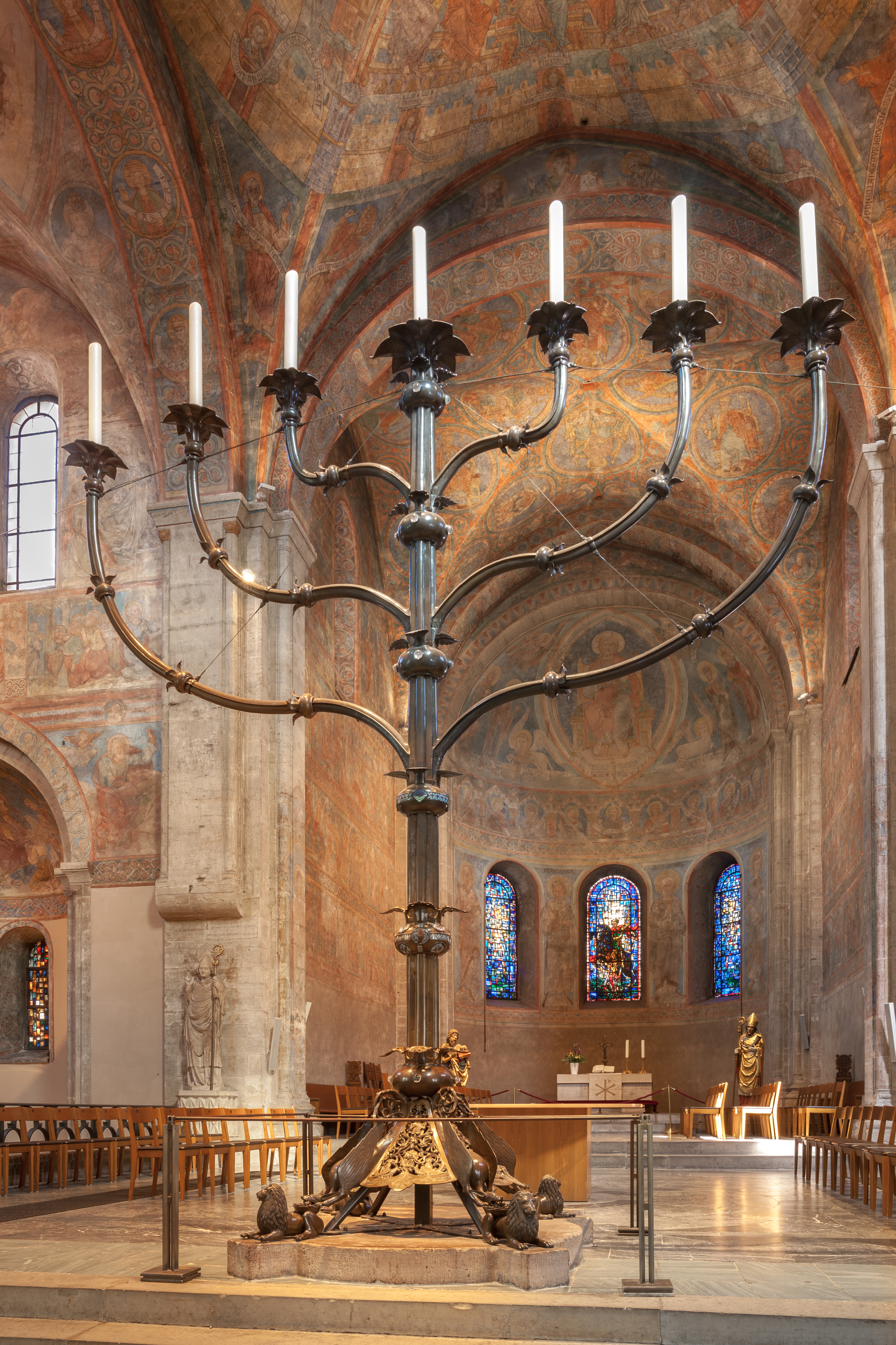
Romanesque candelabra

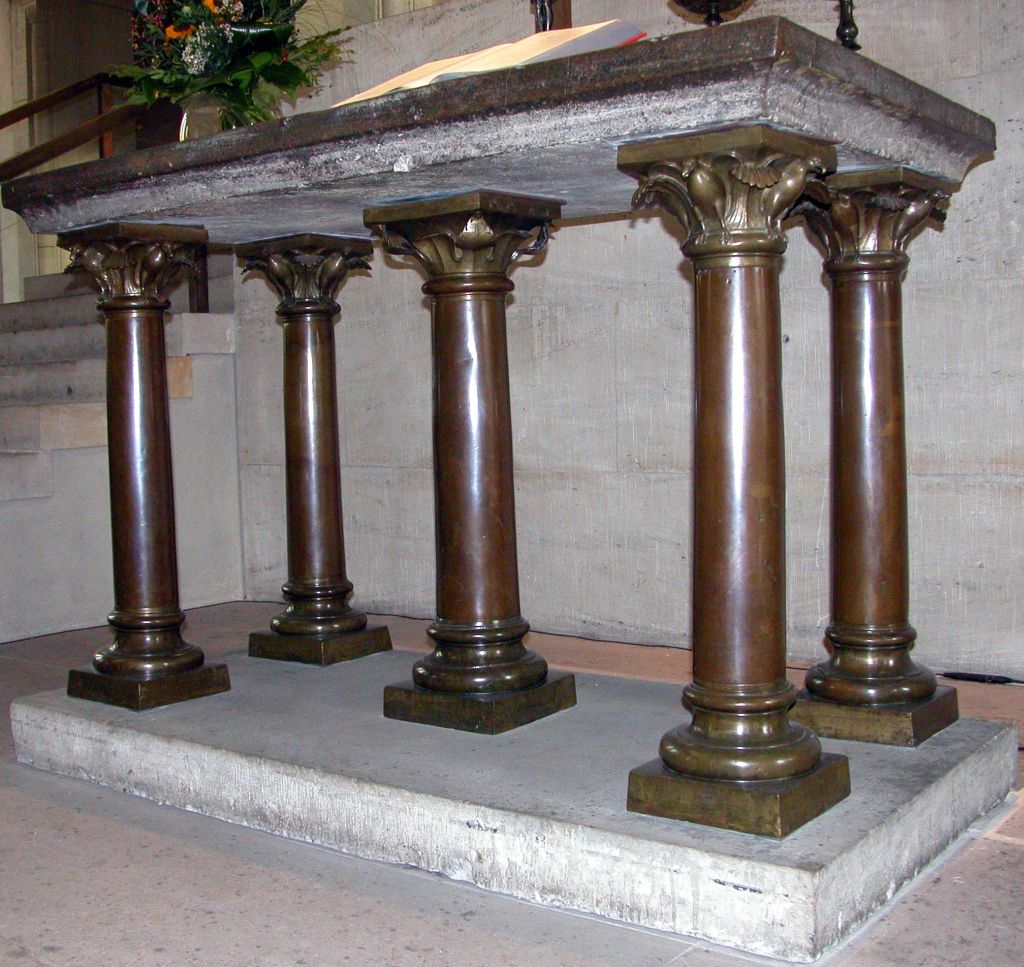
Our Lady's Altar (1188)

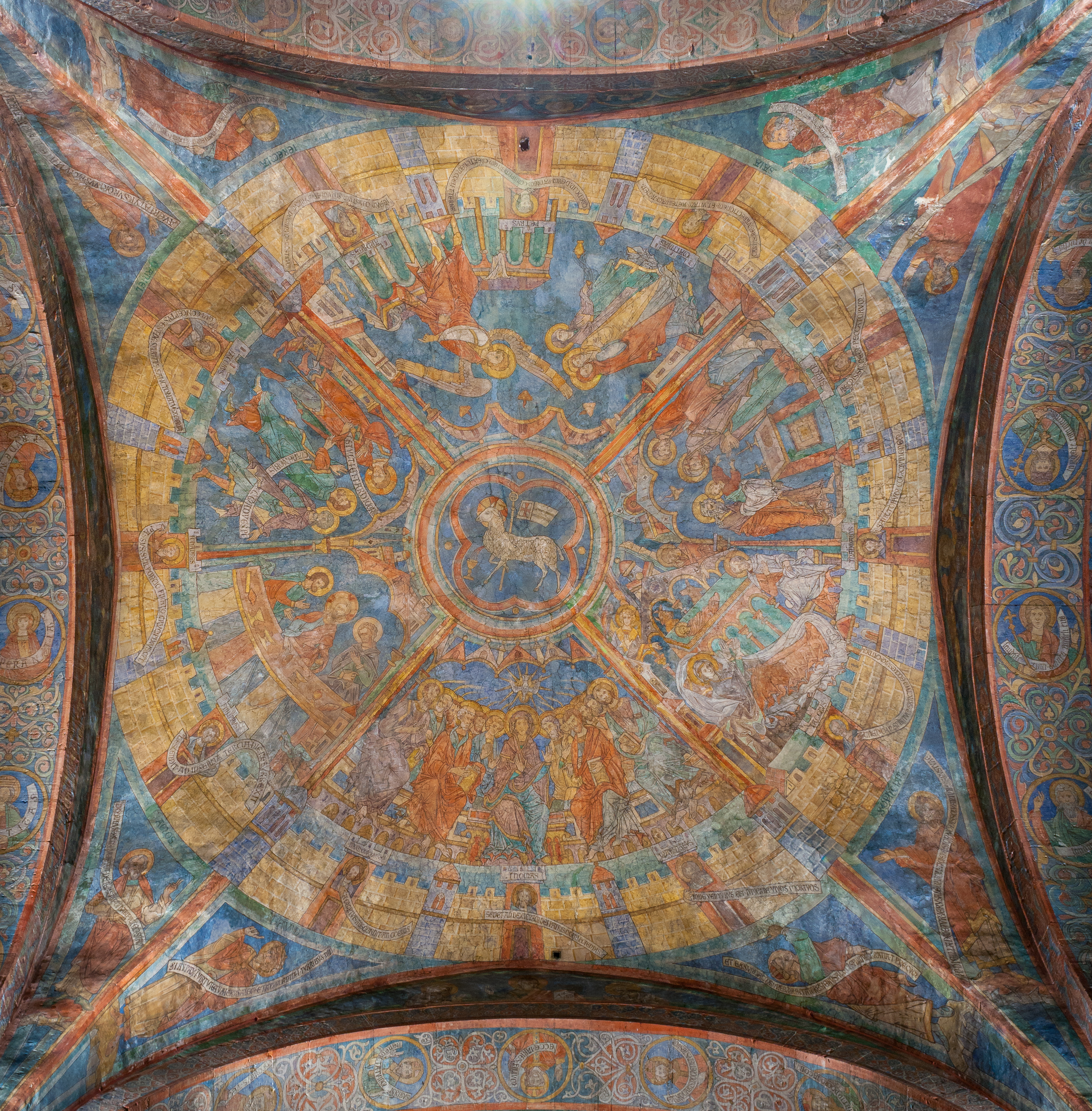
Secco Paintings in the Crossing

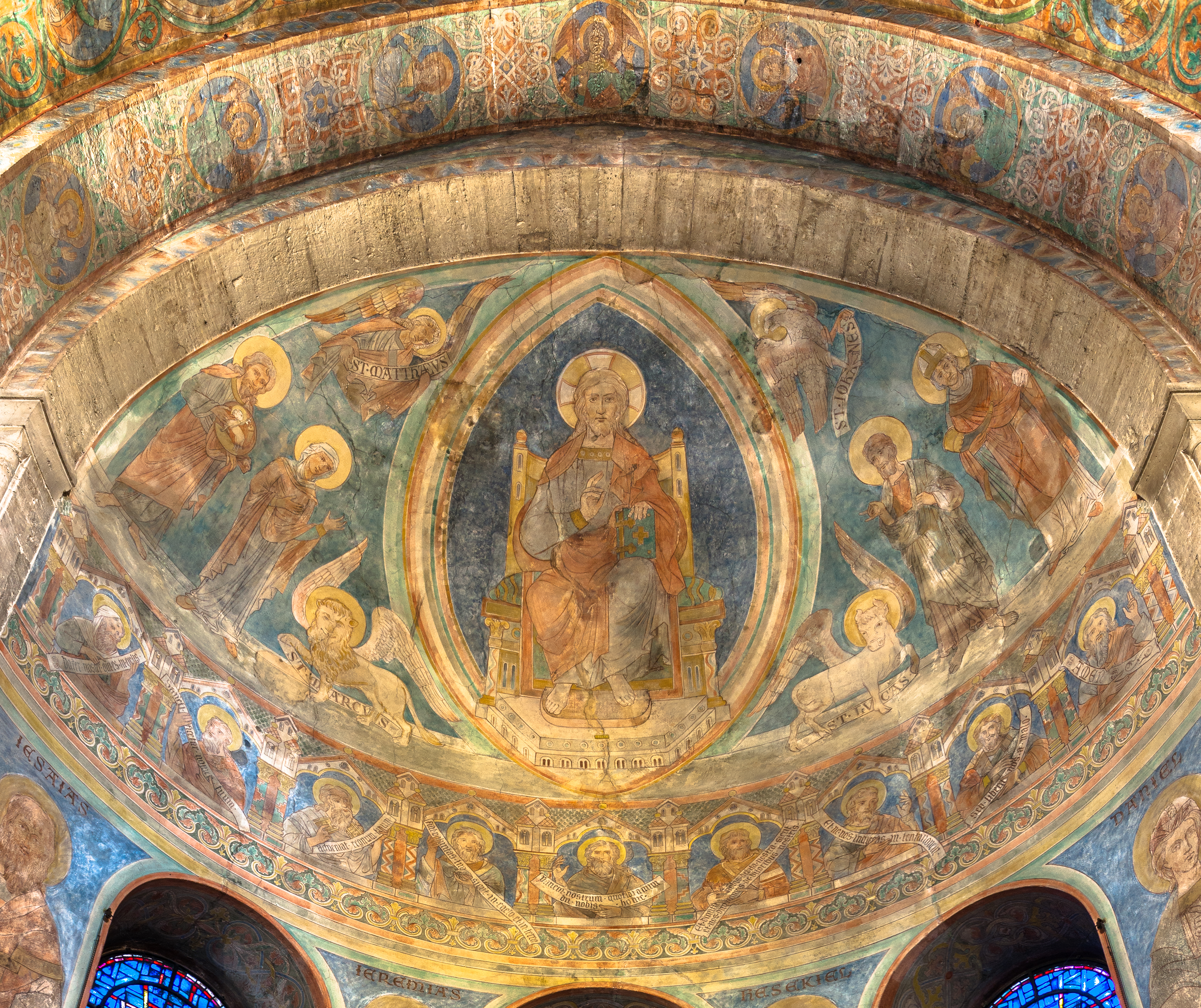
Secco paintings (Christ Pantocrator)

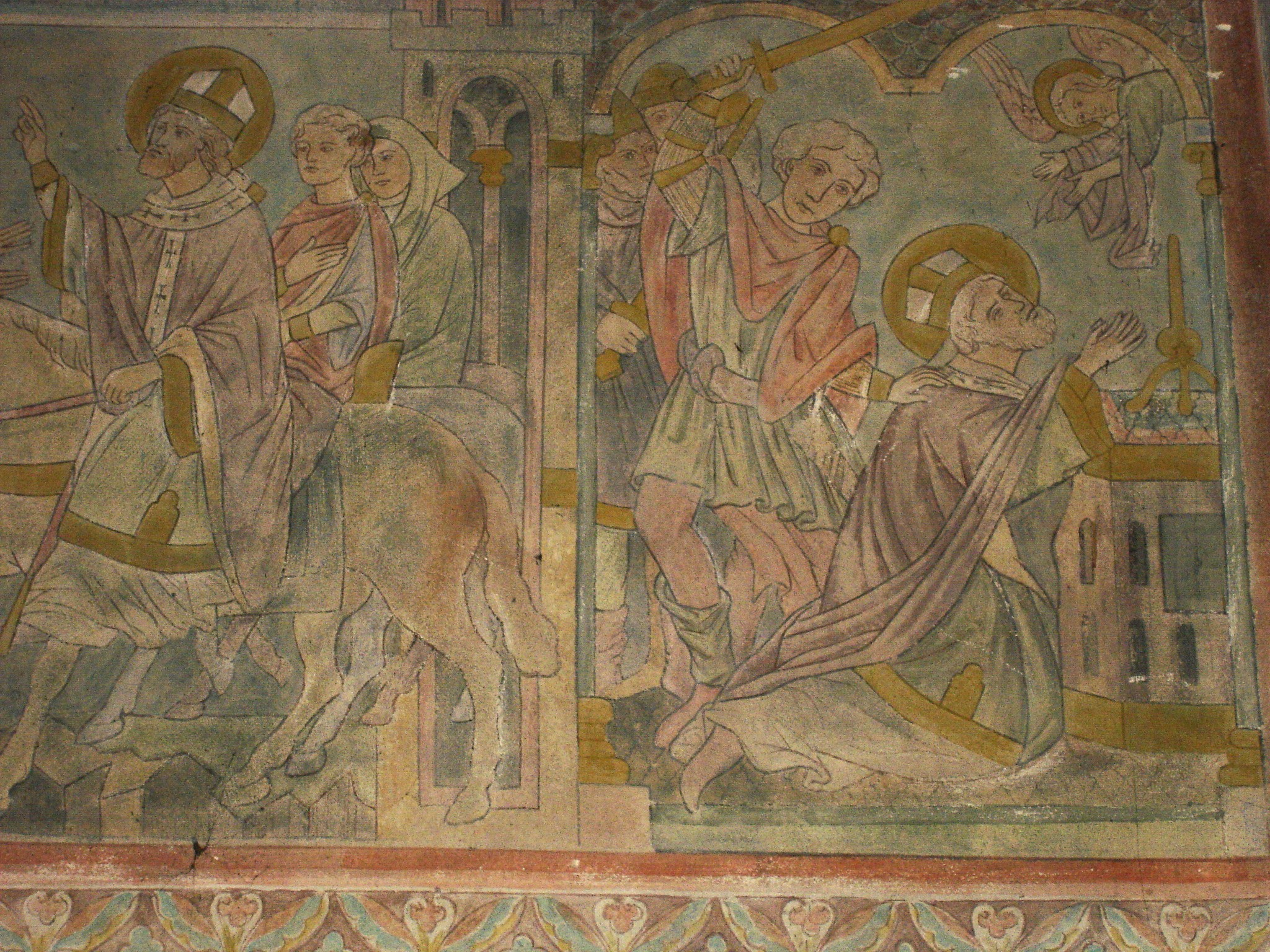
Martyrdom of Thomas Becket, frescoes in Brunswick Cathedral

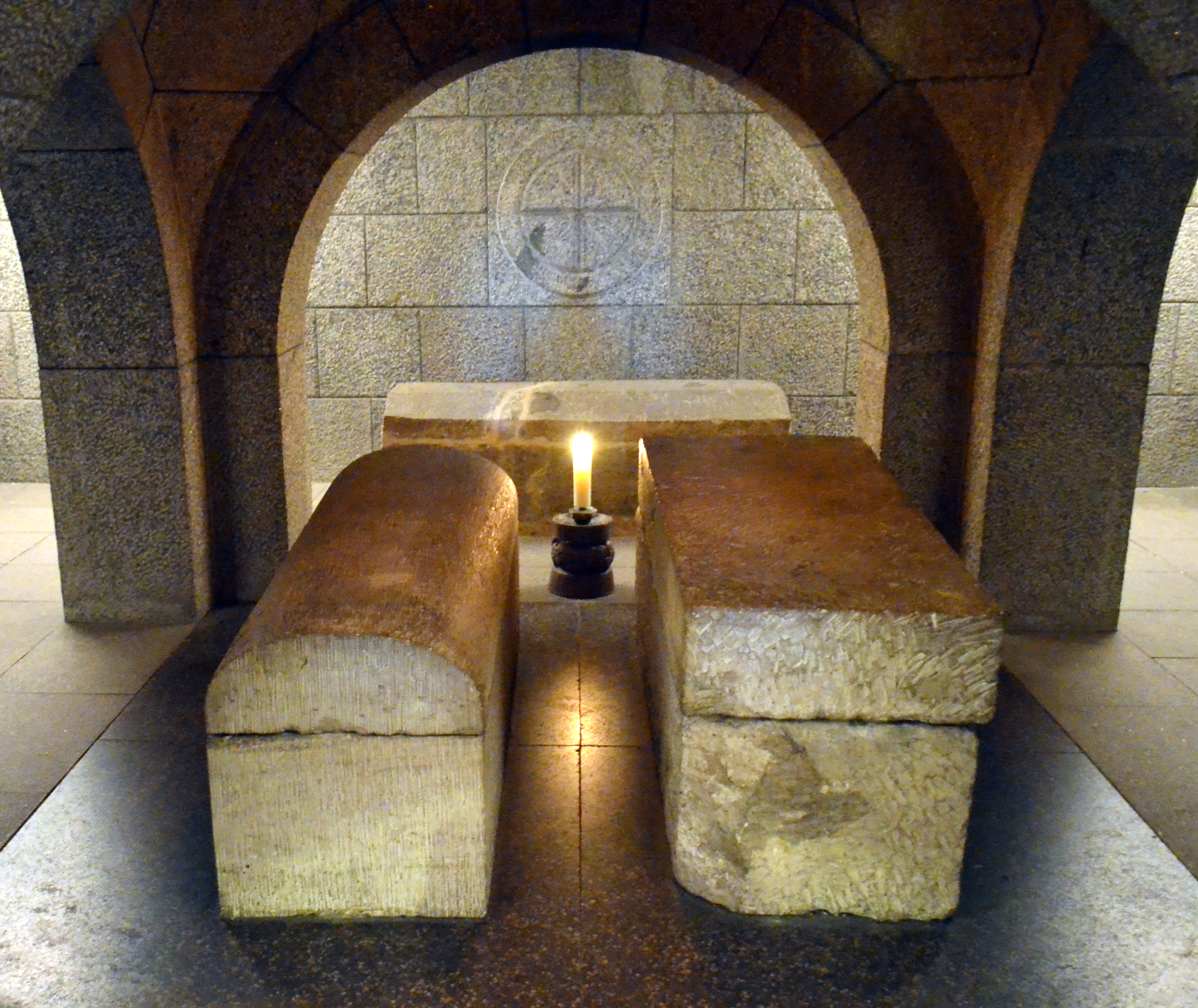
Crypt of Henry the Lion

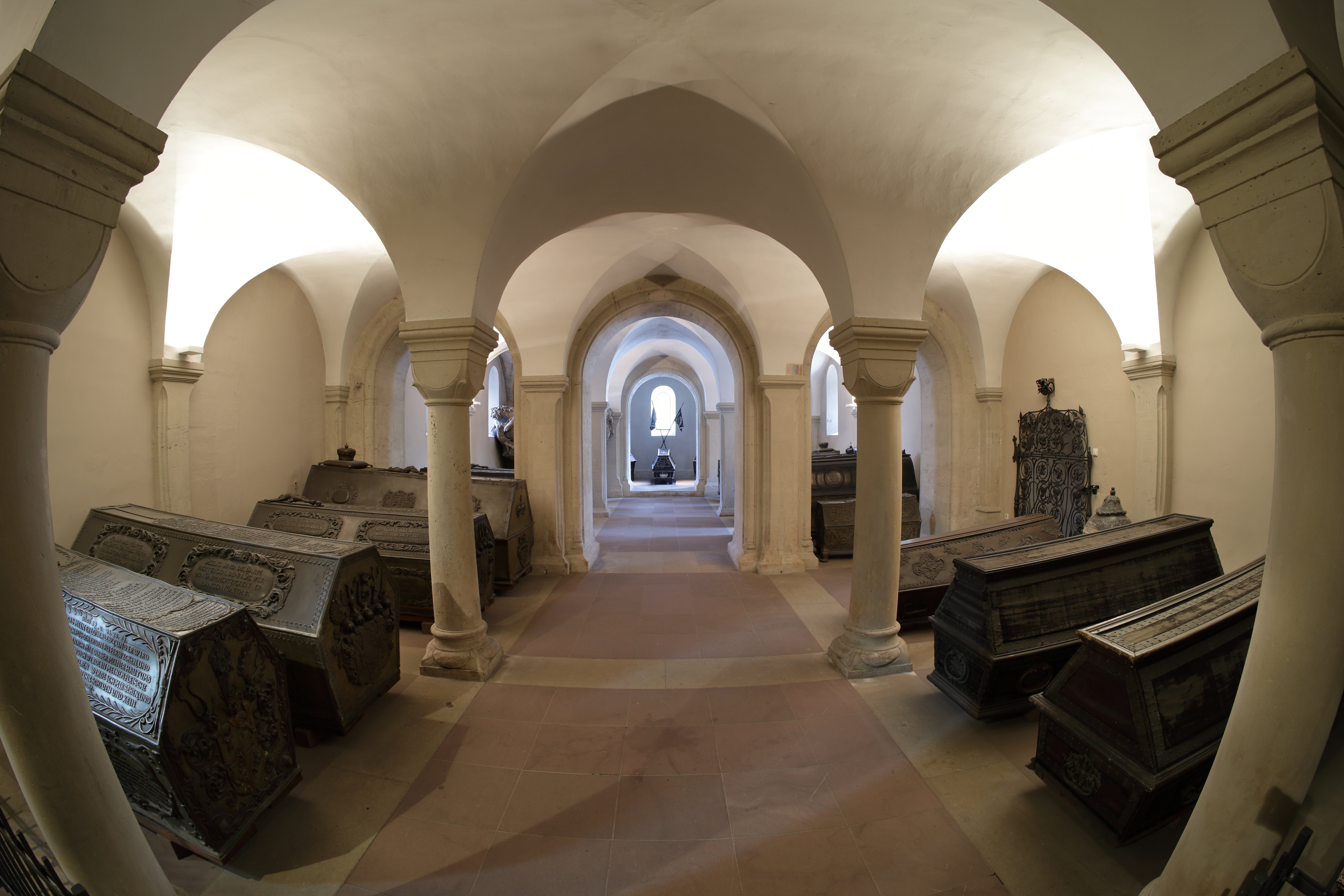
Crypt

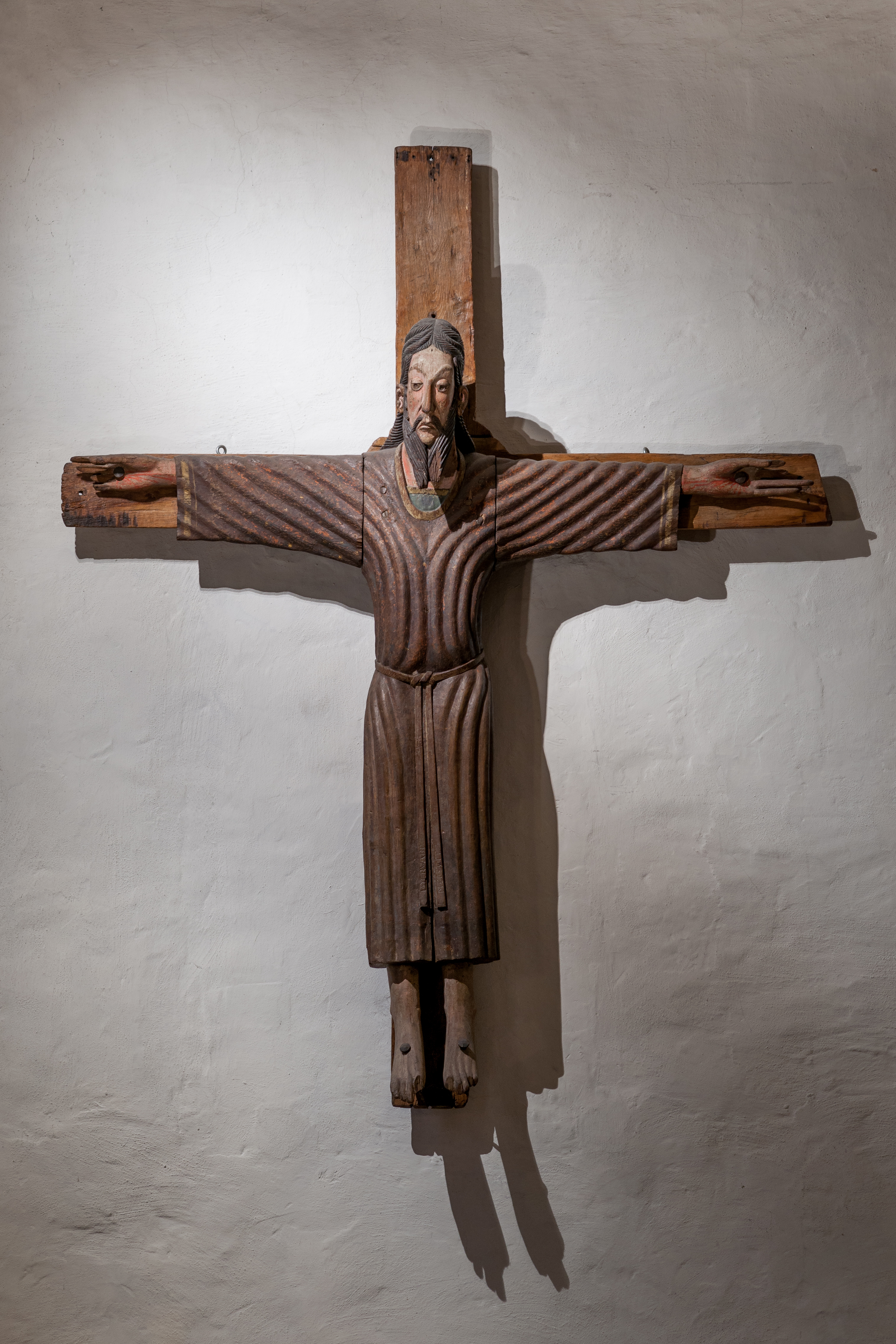
Imervard's Crucifix

== See also ==
- Guelph Treasure
