= William of Winchester, Lord of Lunenburg =

German nobleman (1184–1213)

William of Winchester
- Lord of Lunenburg
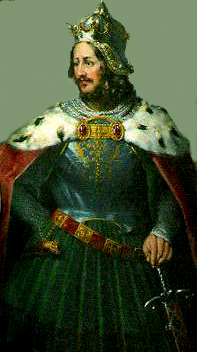
- Born: 11 April 1184
- Died: 13 December 1213 (aged 29)
- Spouse: Helena of Denmark
- Issue: Otto I, Duke of Brunswick-Lüneburg
- House: Welf
- Father: Henry the Lion
- Mother: Matilda of England

William of Winchester (11 April 1184 – 13 December 1213), also called William of Lunenburg (German: Wilhelm von Lüneburg) or William Longsword, a member of the House of Welf, was heir to his family's allodial lands in the Duchy of Saxony after the deposition of his father, Duke Henry the Lion in 1180.

== Life ==
William was the fifth and youngest son of Henry the Lion and Matilda, the eldest daughter of King Henry II of England and Eleanor of Aquitaine. He was born in Winchester, England during his father's exile; he probably remained there when Henry returned to Saxony and was raised at his uncle King Richard I's court.

After his unsuccessful uprising, Henry had submitted to the Hohenstaufen emperor Frederick Barbarossa and though he had to leave Germany, he could retain the Welf possessions around Lüneburg, Brunswick, and Haldensleben. He finally reconciled with Frederick's son and successor Emperor Henry VI in 1194 and surrendered his younger sons William and Otto as hostages for the payment of the ransom for the release of their uncle King Richard. William was extradited to Duke Leopold V of Austria and temporarily held in Hungary.

When Henry the Lion died in 1195, William, Otto and their elder brother Henry V inherited his Saxon allods. The Welf brothers entered into an agreement with Adolf of Altena, archbishop of Cologne, who in 1198 crowned Otto, King of the Romans during the throne quarrel with the Hohenstaufen heir Philip of Swabia. Upon the death of their maternal uncle King Richard in 1199, William and Henry again went to England in order to assert their inheritance claims against their maternal uncle John Lackland, though to no avail.

After the Danish conquest of Holstein in 1201, William met Valdemar, the brother of King Canute VI of Denmark in Hamburg, where he arranged his marriage with the king's sister Helena. Both entered into matrimony in spring 1202, accompanied by the provision of a significant dowry. Their only child was Otto (1204–1252), who inherited his father's property and became the first Duke of Brunswick-Lüneburg in 1235.

William's hopes to assume the rule in Holstein, however, were disappointed by the Danish court. In May 1202, the Welf brothers met at Paderborn, where they divided their father's heritage. William received the northern territories up to the Danish border around the town of Lüneburg, the territory of Lauenburg beyond the Elbe River, Hitzacker, Lüchow, and Dannenberg, as well as the lands around Haldensleben and in the eastern Harz mountain range including Blankenburg and Heimburg with Regenstein Castle. William concentrated on consolidating his rule, strongly relying on the salt trade around Lüneburg, which became his permanent residence.

Upon William's death in 1213, Otto IV acted as a guardian for his brother's son Otto the Child. As both Otto IV and his brother Henry V died without male heirs, Otto the Child became sole ruler of the Welf possessions and progenitor of all Dukes of Brunswick-Lüneburg.

== Sources ==
- Loud, Graham A.; Schenk, Jochen, eds. (2017). The Origins of the German Principalities, 1100-1350: Essays by German Historians. Routledge.
- Webster, Paul, ed. (2021). History of the Dukes of Normandy and the Kings of England by the Anonymous of Bethune. Routledge.
