= Battle of Wassenberg =

1206 battle during the German throne dispute

| Date | 27 July 1206 |
| Location | fields near Wassenberg, North Rhine-Westphalia, western Germany |
| Result | Victory of the Phillip's forces |

Belligerents
| Forces loyal to Phillip of Swabia | Forces loyal to Otto IV |

Commanders and leaders
| Phillip of Swabia; Adolf of Altena | Otto IV; Bruno IV von Sayn |

Strength
| Unknown | c. 2,000 infantry c. 400 cavalry |

The Battle of Wassenberg (German Kaiserschlacht bei Wasserberg) was a military engagement that took place on July 27, 1206, near the town of Wassenberg, western Germany, as part of the German throne dispute. Army of Phillip of Swabia were able to defeat joined troops of Otto IV and Bruno IV von Sayn, Archbiship of Cologne.

== Background ==
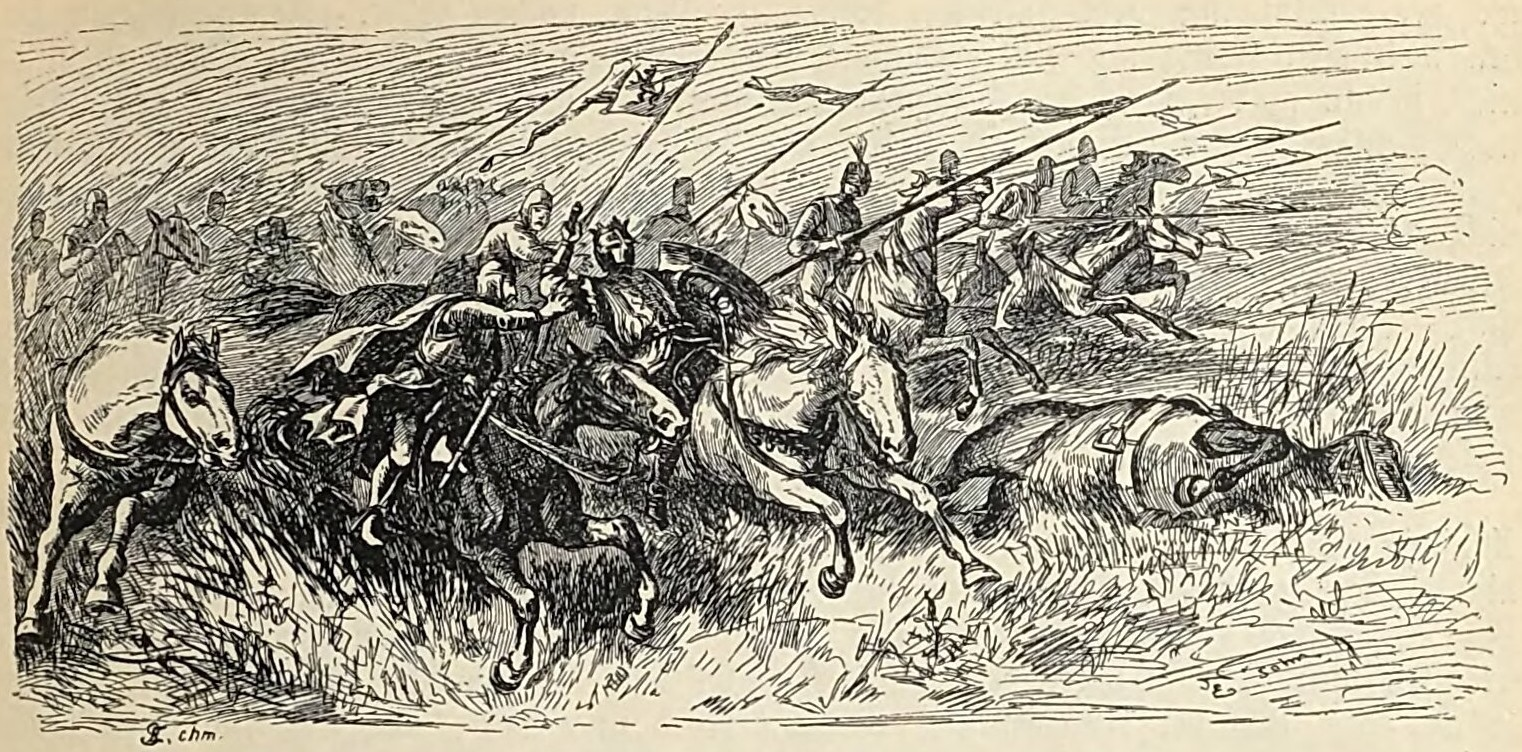
Otto IV is wounded during a sortie from Cologne in October 1205 (illustration by E. Nietzsch Jr., 1890)

Henry VI, Holy Roman Emperor attempted to transform the existing elective monarchy into a hereditary monarchy through the hereditary succession plan announced in March 1196. However, he underestimated the resistance of numerous princes of the Holy Roman Empire. The result was evident in the double election of 1198, in which both Philip of Swabia, from the House of Hohenstaufen, and the Otto IV of Welfs were proclaimed German kings. Both had the opportunity to be crowned emperor, leading to the German throne dispute. A prerequisite for an imperial coronation was the consent of Pope Innocent III, who, however, expected a princely reward for his approval. It soon became clear, though, that it was already too late for a peaceful solution.

In the following years both monarchs gathered allies for their interests. Otto IV was supported by the pope and also Bohemian king Ottokar I or Danish ruler Valdemar II. Neverthenless, Otto's situation worsened because, after England's defeat by France, he lost England's financial support. Many of his allies then changed sides to Philip, including his brother Henry. Phillip, supported by the French, started his military campaign to western Germany, and besieged Cologne in autumn 1205. There's a record about the sortie made by Otto and his forces in the beginning of October 1205, where Otto was wounded.

== Battle ==
In June 1206 Phillip's forces invaded the territory of Cologne again, accompanied by deposed archbishop Adolf, ravaged the country and finally besieged the city of Cologne, where King Otto and Archbishop Bruno were residing. After about a month of the siege, Otto and Bruno decided to proceed a sortie to weaken the enemy forces. Both of the leaders left the city gates with 400 cavalry and 2,000 foot soldiers. Phillip deployed his units to face the enemy, including the men of Henry III, Duke of Limburg.

Both armies clashed on 27 July 1206 at the Roer River near the town of Wassenburg. Otto's forces were decisively defeated by (probably numerically superior) the army of Phillip, which caused Otto's men to flee and Otto and Bruno to seek refuge at the Wassenberg Castle. Castle was shortly after attacked by the enemy: Otto was able to escape, while Bruno von Sayn was captured at the castle by Henry of Kalden. By the authority of Adolf, Bruno was imprisoned at the imperial fortress of Trifels, then held in strict custody in Würzburg and Rothenburg, finally released in 1208.

== Aftermath ==
Following his victory at Wassenberg, Phillip continued in the siege Cologne again and captured the city in November 1206. Since this loss Otto had loss, Innocent found himself forced to make a compromise with Philip. However, just before the conclusion of a treaty, Philip was murdered 21 June 1208 in Bamberg by the Count Palatine Otto of Wittelsbach as the result of a private feud. However, final solution of the German throne dispute came in 1215.

== In culture ==
To commemorate the 800th anniversary of the town of Wassenberg in 2006, Michael Bednarek and Torben Beerboom created a musical 1206 – Die Kaiserschlacht von Wassenberg. The premiere took place on July 27, 2006, in the ballroom of Wassenberg Castle.

== See also ==
- German throne dispute
- Phillip of Swabia
- Wassenberg
- Otto IV, Holy Roman Emperor

== Bibliography ==
- Abulafia, David (1999). The New Cambridge Medieval History Vol. V: c. 1198 – c. 1300. Cambridge University Press.
- Dunham, S. A. (1835). A History of the Germanic Empire, Vol. I.
- Schwann, Mathieu (1891). Illustrierte Geschichte von Bayern, Vol. 2 (in German). Stuttgart: Süddeutsches Verlags-Institut. p. 177.
