= 1208 imperial election =

1208 Holy Roman Empire royal election

- 11 November 1208

Elected by the Imperial princes Consensus needed to win (Note: All electors present were required to reach a unanimous agreement for the election to be valid.)
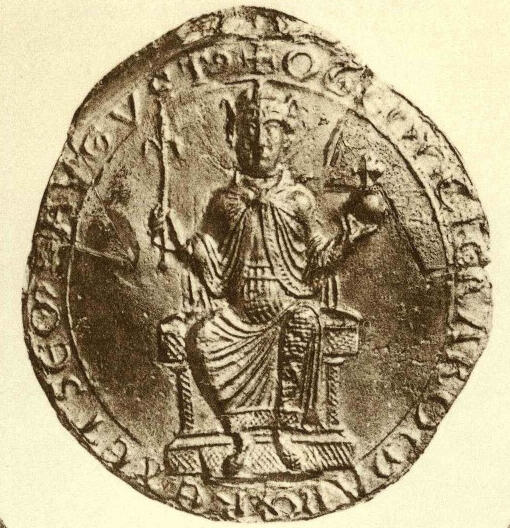
Candidate	Otto IV
House	Welf
Result	Elected
King before election
Philip of Swabia
House of Hohenstaufen
Elected King
Otto IV
House of Welf

The imperial election of 1208 was an imperial election held to select the emperor of the Holy Roman Empire. It took place in Frankfurt on November 11.

As a result of the election, Otto IV was unanimously named Holy Roman Emperor.
