= Dietrich I von Hengebach =

- Archbishop of Cologne
- Reign: 1208-1212
- Predecessor: Bruno IV von Sayn
- Successor: Engelbert II of Berg
- Born: ~ 1150
- Died: after 1223

Dietrich I von Hengebach (born around 1150, died after 1223) was the Archbishop of Cologne. He was elected in 1208. He supported Otto of the House of Welf as Holy Roman Emperor and was excommunicated in 1212 by Innocent III. Upon his excommunication, he lost the Episcopal see and he brought suit in Rome. His suit was rejected in 1215, after which he retired to the Deanery of Saint Apostles in Cologne, where he died after 1223.

== Career ==
Dietrich's origins and family are not clear, although in the year 1166, he was appointed as pastor of the Saint Apostles church in Cologne. In 1199, he opposed Engelbert von Berg in the election to the Cologne cathedral chapter. Dietrich would not accept his defeat he continued arguing the election until 1204. After the deposition of Archbishop Bruno IV, Archbishop of Cologne, upon the urging of Otto IV, Holy Roman Emperor, he was unanimously elected as Archbishop on 22 December 1208, over the opposition, Bruno's nephew, Engelbert II of Berg. Dietrich received priestly and episcopal ordination on 24 May 1209.

The German states had been in turmoil since the late 1190s; the family of the House of Welf competed with the House of Hohenstaufen, a Swabian family, for primacy within the Holy Roman Empire. After a decade of fighting and maneuvering, Otto had secured his own election, only to lose the throne in 1208 and regain it a year later. In 1209, he secured his formal election and coronation as Holy Roman Emperor through the extension of promises to potential supporters in the German lands, and by agreeing with Pope Innocent III to curtail the imperial influence on the Italian peninsula. In 1212, the fighting over the imperial crown broke out again, and Dietrich von Hengebach supported Otto; Innocent excommunicated Otto in 1212. Dietrich refused to accept this excommunication, and was himself placed under interdict. Despite his own excommunication, he continued to celebrate the Holy Mass and used the Holy Oils on Maundy Thursday. The papal legate and the Archbishop of Mainz interceded, and later in 1212 replaced Dietrich with his opponent in the election of 1208, Engelbert von Berg.

Dietrich brought a legal suit to be reinstated; the suit dragged on for three years. At the Battle of Bouvines, on 27 July 1214, Dietrich's ally, Otto, was defeated. A year later Dietrich's suit was rejected. He retired to the deanery at the Apostles church, and died there after 1223. The Cathedral Chapter of Cologne paid the expenses on his lawsuit until 1238.

== Sources ==
Catholic Church titles
Regnal titles
Preceded by Bruno IV von Sayn	Archbishop of Cologne and Duke of Westphalia and Angria; 1208–1212 excommunicated and deposed 1212–1215 contested with successor	Succeeded by Engelbert II of Berg
