= Bruno IV von Sayn =

Bruno IV von Sayn (died 2 November 1208) was the archbishop of Cologne from 1205 until his death.

Bruno was the son of Eberhard I, Count of Sayn. He was the provost of Saint Maria ad Gradus in Cologne from 1180, of the Basilica of Saint Castor in Koblenz from 1182 and of the church of Saint Cassius in Bonn from 1192. With the support of the Welfs and Duke Henry III of Limburg, he was elected archbishop on 25 July 1205, following the deposition of Archbishop Adolf of Altena in 1204. He was consecrated sometime between 24 December 1205 and 17 February 1206.

Bruno was supported by Otto of Brunswick and the townspeople, but the House of Berg, the provost Engelbert and suffragan bishops continued to support Adolf. In September 1205, Otto's rival for the German throne, Philip of Swabia, began to besiege the city. In the fighting, Otto was wounded and took refuge in the city. On 27 July 1206, Otto and Bruno jointly led an army out of the city confront the besiegers in open battle. In the ensuing battle of Wassenberg, they were defeated and took refuge in Wassenberg Castle. When the castle was taken, Bruno was captured, while Otto escaped.

Philip imprisoned Bruno in Trifels Castle. He was released after a year under pressure form Pope Innocent III, who summoned both Bruno and Adolf to Rome. On 1 May 1208, it was decided that Bruno would control the spiritual powers of the archdiocese, while Adolf would have control of its temporalities. After the assassination of Philip in September 1208, Otto summoned Bruno to return to Cologne, but the latter died not long after.
