= Erbreichsplan =

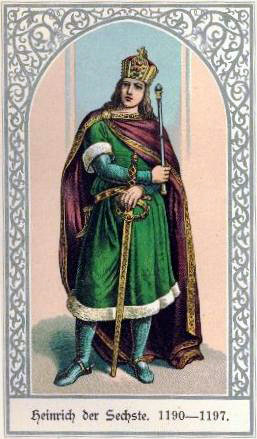
Henry VI proposed Erbreichsplan.

Erbreichsplan is a German word meaning "plan for a hereditary empire". It refers to the proposal of Henry VI, Holy Roman Emperor (1191–1197), to abolish imperial election and make the Holy Roman Empire hereditary within his family, the Staufer. This would effectively have combined the Empire and its three kingdoms—Germany, Italy and Burgundy—with the hereditary kingdom of Sicily, which belonged to Henry and his heirs in right of his wife, the heiress Constance. Since Sicily was a papal fief, this plan was strongly opposed by the Papacy. It also failed to generate sufficient support among the imperial princes.

== Background ==
Henry, who had been crowned Holy Roman Emperor in 1191, was known for being highly aggressive in guarding and expanding the rights of the imperial crown. In 1194, he invaded the Kingdom of Sicily and conquered it from its king, William III. That same year, his wife Constance gave birth to a son, Frederick II, who would, if all went well, inherit both the Imperial title and the Kingdom of Sicily. It was Henry's dream to have the Empire and Sicily permanently unified under the House of Hohenstaufen.

Unfortunately for Henry's plans, however, the Empire was an elective monarchy, meaning that the Hohenstaufens' hold on the imperial title depended on a favorable election by the princes after the death of every Emperor. The dynasty's hold on the empire could never be secure as long as the princes controlled the electoral process. Henry was aware of developments in other European countries such as France, where the principle of hereditary monarchy was firmly established and the strength of the crown was increasing. Henry ultimately decided on pursuing a way to change the imperial title into a hereditary one, and attempted to gain the support of the princes of the Empire.

The secular princes, for their part, feared Henry's extensive powers. Although hereditary succession for princes (Leihezwang) had become customary within the Empire, it was still not a formal right and on multiple occasions Henry refused to enfeoff the direct heir of a deceased prince with the latter's territory (the most notable example of this being Henry's seizure of the Margraviate of Meissen in 1195 as a vacant fief after the death of Albrecht the Proud, rather than enfeoffing Albrecht's brother Dietrich I with the margraviate). As a result, the princes were nervous about their rights of inheritance and were willing to grant certain concessions to the Emperor in exchange for the preservation of these rights.

== The plan ==
After his capture of Sicily in 1194 Henry was busy organizing for a possible crusade and negotiating over the election of his son Frederick as his successor within the Empire. The secular princes in the meantime made their desire for hereditary imperial fiefs, and for the recognition of the capacity for inheritance by the female line as well, known. By agreeing to consider these demands, Henry was able to gain the acceptance by a majority of the secular princes for the idea of hereditary monarchy. Henry also bought the support of the ecclesiastical princes by announcing that he would be willing to give up the right of jus spolii, which had for years been used against Church lands.

Despite the high degree of support he had from the secular and ecclesiastical princes for the idea, however, Henry was unable to secure an agreement in writing. The first obstacle to the plan was the Archbishop of Cologne, Adolf of Altena. Besides being opposed towards Henry's rule in general, Adolf was unwilling to give up the significant level of influence that his position traditionally held over the imperial election. When he aroused the resistance of several Saxon and Thuringian princes against the Emperor, Henry realized that he would be unable to establish hereditary monarchy without resistance.

Henry next turned to the papacy, hoping that if he could get the support of the pope that the matter would be settled. Pope Celestine III, however, had many reasons to oppose such a plan, including the longstanding papal opposition to the expansion of Imperial power in Italy. Henry tried to compromise with Celestine, offering to meet several papal demands and probably offering a financial incentive. Ultimately the pope decided that the hazards of a hereditary monarchy were too great and refused to support Henry.

Henry now found his campaign to turn his office into a hereditary one stalled. He gave up on his plans for the time being, in the meantime securing the election of Frederick as King of the Romans in late 1196. Over the next year he was bogged down by a revolt in Sicily and preparations for the Crusade, when he suddenly died in September 1197. His death put a definitive end to his plans for hereditary Imperial succession; the issue was quickly forgotten as the Empire quickly descended into civil war between Philip of Swabia and Otto IV. Henry's attempts to turn the Imperial title into a hereditary one were ultimately futile, and the Holy Roman Empire remained an elective monarchy (albeit de facto under the Habsburgs for the last four centuries, with a brief interruption) all the way up until its dissolution in 1806.
