= Bruno of Cologne (disambiguation) =

Bruno of Cologne was the founder of the Carthusian Order.

Bruno of Cologne may also refer to:

- Bruno the Great, archbishop of Cologne (953–965)
- Bruno II von Berg, archbishop of Cologne (1131–1137)
- Bruno III von Berg, archbishop of Cologne (1191–1193)
- Bruno IV von Sayn, archbishop of Cologne (1205–1208)
