= Adolf of Altena =

Archbishop of Cologne from 1193 to 1205

Adolf of Altena, Adolf of Berg or Adolf of Cologne, (c. 1157 – 15 April 1220 in Neuss) was Archbishop of Cologne from 1193 to 1205.

== Biography ==
Adolf was born about 1157 as the second son of Count Eberhard of Berg-Altena and his wife Adelheid von Arnsberg.

About 1177 he became a canon in Cologne. Later, in 1183, he became Dean of the Cathedral, and in the year 1191 Cathedral Provost. After the abdication of his uncle Bruno III of Berg he became Archbishop of Cologne in 1193, as Adolf I, or Adolf I von Altena.

In March 1194 he received his episcopal consecration by Hermann II of Katzenelnbogen, Prince-Bishop of Münster. In the same year Adolf was instrumental in arranging the release of King Richard I of England, whom he received with considerable solemnity in Cologne shortly afterwards, at the beginning of February 1194. He was a declared opponent of the plans for a hereditary empire of Emperor Henry VI and at Christmas 1195 refused Henry's wish for the election of his son Frederick Roger. He gave up his opposition in August 1197 for the secondary election of the candidate chosen in the meantime by the other Electors in Boppard. However, after the death of Henry VI, Adolf declared the election invalid, as the candidate was not baptised and the Emperor had put the Electors under pressure.

In the ensuing dynastic struggle for the throne between the Hohenstaufen and the Welfs, he crowned on 12 July 1198 the Welf Otto of Brunswick in Aachen as King of the Romans (or German king). Shortly afterwards, Pope Innocent III, who had an interest in weakening the Hohenstaufen and in breaking their power (particularly in Italy), confirmed the election of Otto. On 6 January 1205 however Adolf then crowned the Staufen competitor for the crown, Philip of Swabia, as German king. Philip had already been crowned in 1198, although only in Mainz Cathedral, but he had nevertheless been crowned with the genuine Imperial Regalia and especially the Imperial crown.

The Pope, who had reserved himself the king's question himself, was irritated by the rumor of the page change and asked Adolf himself for a report. Since Adolf did not want to sacrifice his just hard-won right of the decisive vote in the royal election, a papal presentation, he did not respond to the papal request. However, he overestimated its importance by far.

On 19 July 1205 Adolf was excommunicated by Pope Innocent III and declared deposed. Already in July, a new archbishop was elected in Cologne. Since one was still in the Rhineland but still in the Hohenstaufen line, his successor could barely prevail against him, so that it came to a schism in the archbishopric of Cologne.

In 1207 Adolf von Altena was in Rome, where he tried against his successor and fought for his reinstatement as archbishop - without success. Only the murder of Philip of Swabia (21 June 1208) and the changed political situation led to a submission to the pope and a recognition of his successor for himself and his followers, for which he received an annual pension of 250 marks. Adolf, from then until his death, was active in the archdiocese of Cologne as an auxiliary bishop. However his see was not returned to him.

Dietrich I von Hengebach was deposed by the papal legate, and in March 1212 he was appointed to head the diocese. While initially holding this to be reinstated, he soon realized that it was just a provisional lead. In fact, the Archdiocese was again in the schism, especially since Adolf now argued with Dietrich von Hengebach before the Pope for reinstatement. The verdict was in 1216 and in Cologne it came again to the election of the bishop. The new archbishop became his successor as cathedral provost, Engelbert II of Berg. He was one of his relatives and had always supported him during the time of the schism, including by handing over goods from the cathedral chapter.

Until his death, in 1220, Adolf was again active as auxiliary bishop in the archbishopric of Cologne. He died on 15 April 1220 in Neuss.

Adolf of Altena Counts of Altena Born: c. 1157 Died: 15 April 1220 in Neuss
Catholic Church titles
Regnal titles
Preceded by Bruno III of Berg	Archbishop of Cologne and Duke of Westphalia and Angria; 1193–1205	Succeeded by Bruno IV von Sayn

== Literature ==
- Herbert Grundmann (1953). "Adolf I.". Neue Deutsche Biographie (in German). Vol. 1. Berlin: Duncker & Humblot. pp. 82–83. (full text online).
- Wilhelm Janssen: Das Erzbistum Köln im späten Mittelalter 1191–1515. Erster Teil (Geschichte des Erzbistums Köln, Zweiter Band). Bachem, Köln 1995, ISBN 3-7616-1149-8.
- Hugo Stehkämper: Der Kölner Erzbischof Adolf von Altena und die deutsche Königswahl (1195–1205). In: Theodor Schieder (Hrsg.): Beiträge zur Geschichte des mittelalterlichen deutschen Königtums. Oldenbourg, München 1973, S. 5–83.
- Hugo Stehkämper (1980). "Adolf I. von Altena". Lexikon des Mittelalters, I: Aachen bis Bettelordenskirchen (in German). Stuttgart and Weimar: J. B. Metzler. col. 159–161. ISBN 3-7608-8901-8.
- Alfred Winkelmann: Adolf I. (Archbishop of Cologne). In: (ADB). Volume 1, Duncker & Humblot, Leipzig 1875, pp. 115–117.
- Genealogische Handbuch des Adels, Gräfliche Häuser A Band II, 1955;
- W. Gf v. Limburg Stirum, "Stamtafel der Graven van Limburg Stirum", 's Gravenhage 1878;
- A.M.H.J. Stokvis, "Manuel d'Histoire, de Genealogie et de Chronologie de tous les États du Globe", Tome III, Leiden 1890-93;
- W. K. Prins v. Isenburg, "Stammtafeln zur Geschichte der Europaischen Staaten", 2. Aufl., Marburg/Lahn, 1953.
