= Beatrice of Swabia =

Holy Roman Empress in 1212

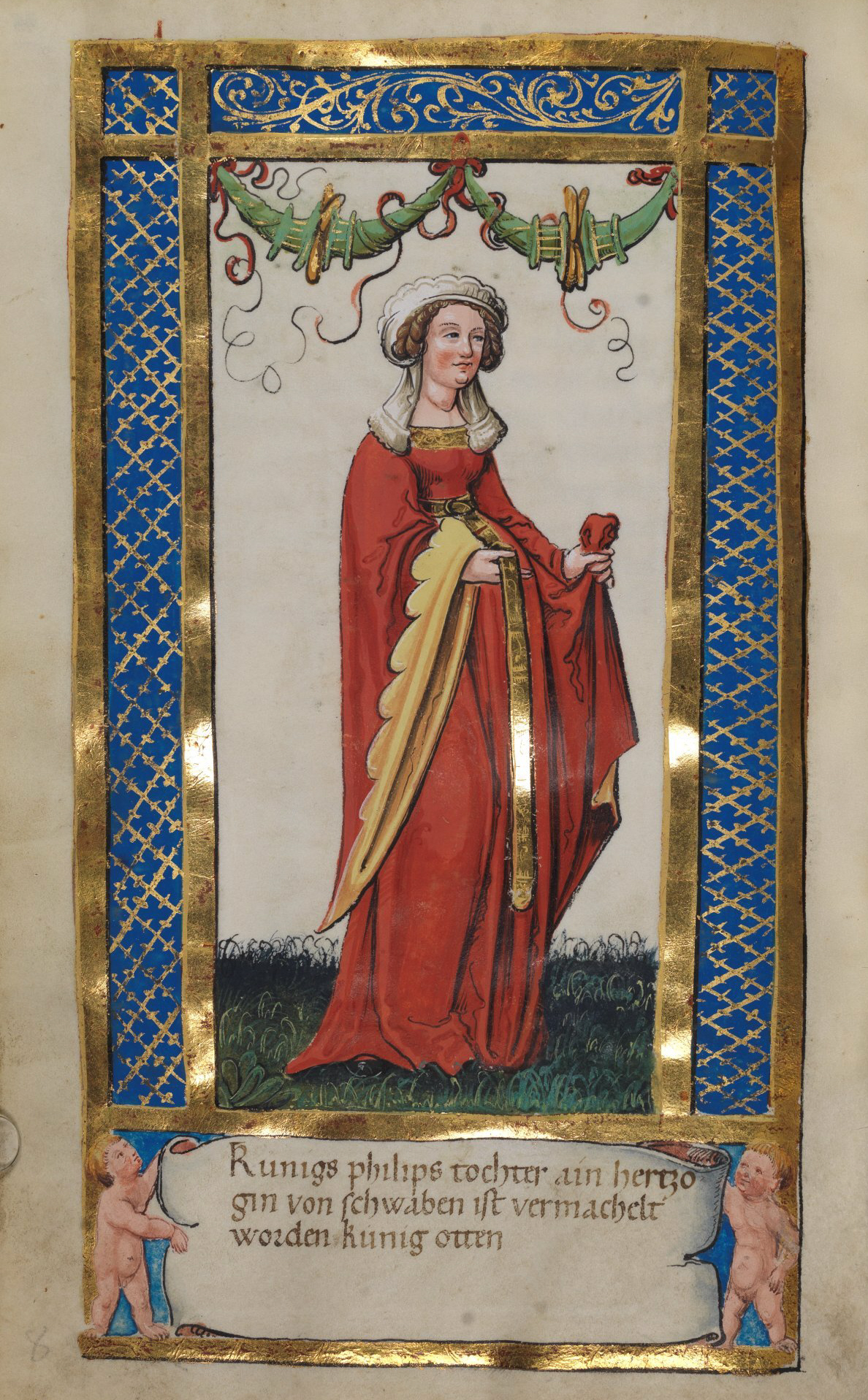
- Portrait in the Weingarten Stifterbüchlein, c. 1500

Holy Roman Empress Queen consort of Germany
- Tenure: 22 July 1212 – 11 August 1212
- Born: April or June 1198; Worms, Franconia
- Died: 11 August 1212 (aged 14); Nordhausen, Thuringia
- Burial: Brunswick Cathedral
- Spouse: Otto IV, Holy Roman Emperor (m. 1209 or 1212; d. 1212)
- House: Hohenstaufen
- Father: Philip of Swabia
- Mother: Irene Angelina

Beatrice of Swabia (German: Beatrix, Spanish: Beatriz; April/June 1198 – 11 August 1212), a member of the Hohenstaufen dynasty, was Holy Roman Empress and German Queen in 1212 as the first wife of the Welf emperor Otto IV. She was also the shortest-serving Holy Roman Empress, dying three weeks into her marriage.

== Life ==
Born at Worms in Rhenish Franconia in April or June 1198, Beatrice was the eldest daughter and first child of Duke Philip of Swabia, who during the time of her birth was elected German king (King of the Romans or Rex Francorum according to Salic law), and the Byzantine princess Irene Angelina. After her father Philip, the younger brother of late Emperor Henry VI, had been elected king on 8 March 1198, her future husband Otto of Brunswick was elected Anti-king of Germany on 9 June.

=== Struggles for betrothal ===
Already in 1203, King Philip attempted to betroth Beatrice to the nephew of Pope Innocent III, in order to gain the support of the Roman Curia. However, his plans failed and the rivals continued to fight. In 1207 Philip made an attempt to reconcile with Otto by offering him the hands of his daughter. Though Otto's strategic position had become unfavourable, he did not accept until Philip on 21 June was killed by the Bavarian count palatine Otto VIII of Wittelsbach. Otto of Wittelsbach, who had to dissolve his former engagement with Philip's daughter Kunigunde of Hohenstaufen, had asked for the hand of either Beatrice or one of her three younger sisters in compensation. His request had been denied and he reacted violently. Beatrice was orphaned, when her mother Irene, renamed Maria, fled to Hohenstaufen Castle and died there on 27 August after delivering her youngest child.

Otto IV, suspected of being involved in the assassination, had by this point lost the support of his two main allies, Pope Innocent III and King John of England. He had been forced to retire to his hereditary lands near Brunswick in Saxony. However, the murder of Philip left him the only King of Germany. He took advantage to make amends with the remaining members and supporters of the House of Hohenstaufen and finally accepted late Philip's offer. Their new alliance was sealed with the betrothal of Beatrice to Otto IV.

On 11 November 1208, Otto IV was again elected King of Germany in Frankfurt. This time he was supported by members of both sides of the previous civil war. He was crowned Holy Roman Emperor by Pope Innocent III on 4 October 1209. Beatrice was only eleven years old and remained betrothed to Otto IV, approximately thirty-four years old.

=== Marriage and death ===
As the bride was related to the Welf dynasty by her great-grandmother Judith of Bavaria, a papal consent had to be obtained, granted by Pope Innocent III in return for donations to the Cistercian abbeys of Walkenried and Riddagshausen. They were married in Nordhausen on 22 July 1212. The bride then was 14 years old and the groom about 37.

The marriage with the granddaughter of late Emperor Frederick Barbarossa helped to reinforce Otto's position after Philip's nephew Frederick II, Beatrice's cousin, had been elected anti-king a year before. However, Beatrice soon fell sick and died only 19 days after the marriage. She was childless at the time of her death.

Beatrice was buried in Brunswick Cathedral. A few weeks later, Frederick II arrived in Germany and on 9 December was crowned king in Mainz Cathedral. Otto IV was deposed and died in retirement at Harzburg Castle.

Beatrice of Swabia House of Hohenstaufen
Royal titles
| Vacant Title last held by Constance of Sicily | Empress consort of the Holy Roman Empire; 22 July 1212 – 11 August 1212 | Vacant Title next held by Marie of Brabant |
| Vacant Title last held by Irene Angelina | Queen consort of Germany; 22 July 1212 – 11 August 1212 | Vacant Title next held by Marie of Brabant |
