= Welf =

Welf is a Germanic first name that may refer to:

- Welf (father of Judith), 9th century Frankish count, father-in-law of Louis the Pious
- Welf I, d. bef. 876, count of Alpgau and Linzgau
- Welf II, Count of Swabia, died 1030, supposed descendant of Welf I
- Welf, Duke of Carinthia (Welf III), died 1055, son of Welf II
- Welf I, Duke of Bavaria (Welf IV), died 1101, nephew of Welf of Carinthia and son of Albert Azzo II, Margrave of Milan|Azzo II of Este
- Welf II, Duke of Bavaria (Welf V), died 1120, son of Welf I of Bavaria
- Welf VI, died 1191, Duke of Spoleto and Marchese of Tuscany, nephew of Welf II of Bavaria
- Welf VII, died 1167, Duke of Spoleto, son of Welf VI

Welf was also the name of two related dynasties:

- Elder House of Welf, dynasty of European rulers in the 9th through 11th centuries to 1055
- House of Welf, European dynasty that included many German and British monarchs from the 11th to 20th century

== See also ==
- Guelph (disambiguation)
