= Guelph (disambiguation) =

Guelph is a city in Ontario, Canada.

Guelph may also refer to:

- Guelph (federal electoral district), consisting of the City of Guelph, Ontario
- Guelph (provincial electoral district), as the above
- University of Guelph, in the same city
- House of Welf, also known as the House of Guelph, a European noble family
- Guelphs and Ghibellines, political factions in medieval Italy
- Guelph Treasure, a collection of German medieval art
- The Guelph Party, an alternative name for the German-Hanoverian Party, a historical conservative political party in the German Empire and the Weimar Republic
