= Eduard Winkelmann =

German historian (1838–1896)

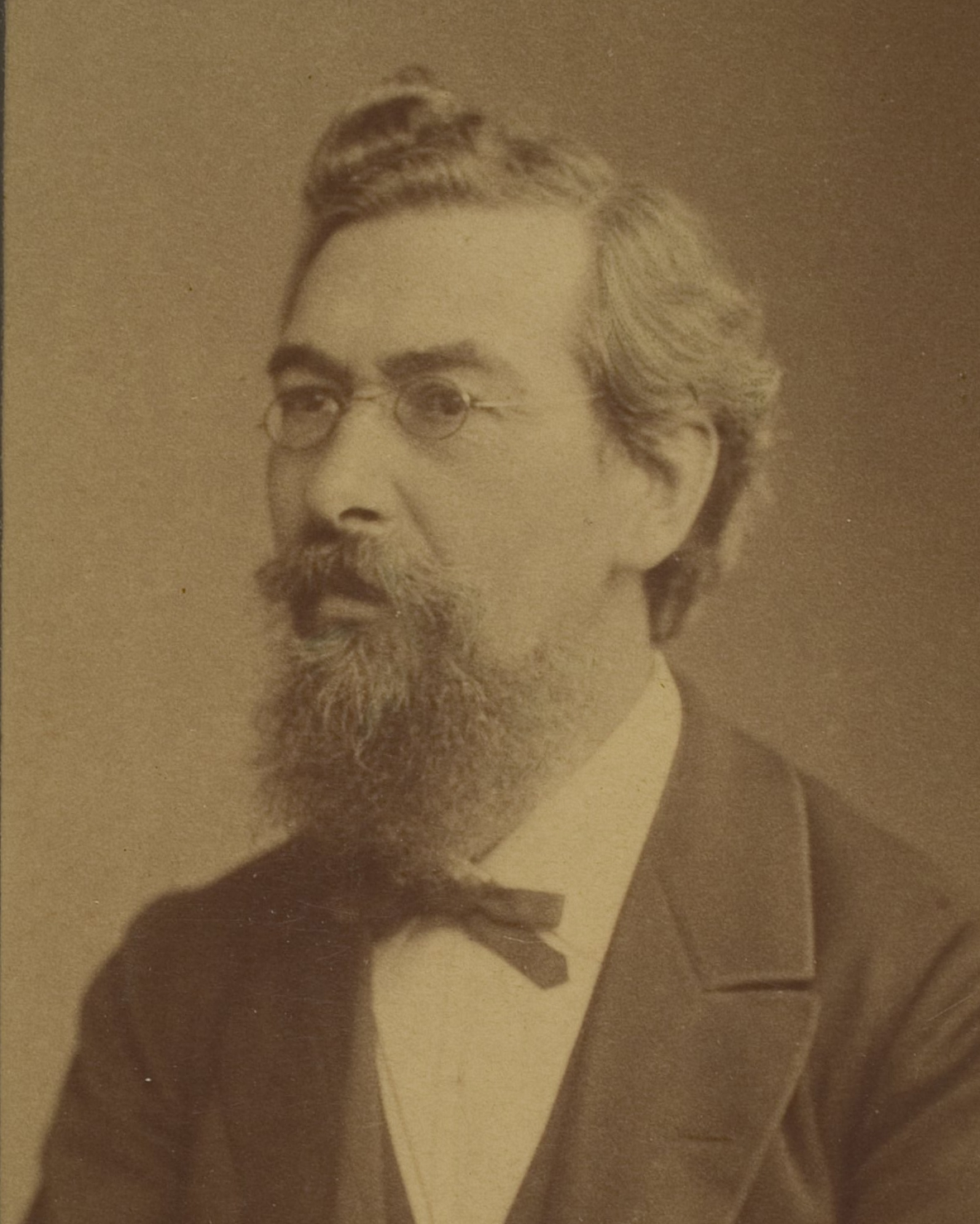
Eduard Winkelmann

Eduard Winkelmann (June 25, 1838 – February 10, 1896) was a German historian.

== Biography ==
He was born at Danzig (Gdańsk) in the Province of Prussia. He studied at the universities of Berlin and Göttingen, worked at the Monumenta Germaniae historica, and in 1869 became professor of history at the University of Bern, and four years later at Heidelberg. He also spent some time in the Russian Empire, where he was headmaster at the knight and chapter school in Reval (Tallinn) beginning in 1860, and was later appointed professor at the Imperial University of Dorpat (1865). He died at Heidelberg.

== Works ==
Winkelmann wrote a Geschichte der Angelsachsen bis zum Tode König Ælfreds (Berlin, 1883); and his residence in Russia induced him to compile a Bibliotheca Livoniae historica (St Petersburg, 1869–1870, and Berlin, 1878); but his chief works deal with the history of the Holy Roman Empire during the Later Middle Ages.

The most important of these are:

- Philipp van Schwaben und Otto IV van Braunschweig (Leipzig, 1873–1878)
- Geschichte Kaiser Friedrichs II und seiner Reiche 1212–1235 (Berlin, 1863) and 1235–1250 (Reval, 1865)
- Kaiser Friedrich II (Leipzig, 1889–1898)
- Writings on Friedrich II in the Jahrbücher der deutschen Geschichte (Leipzig, 1862)

He edited the Acta imperii inedita (Innsbruck, 1880-1885), and with Julius Ficker, Die Regesten des Kaiserreichs unter Wilhelm, Alfons X und Richard (Innsbruck, 1882, 1901).

Among Winkelmann's other works are:

- Forschungen zur deutschen Geschichte (1872)
- Allgemeine Verfassungsgeschichte (Leipzig, 1901)
- Urkundenbuch der Universität Heidelberg (Heidelberg, 1886) (Bd. 1, Bd. 1).
