= German throne dispute =

Dynastic conflict in the Holy Roman Empire from 1198 to 1215

The German throne dispute or German throne controversy (German: Deutscher Thronstreit) was a political conflict in the Holy Roman Empire from 1198 to 1215. This dispute, between the House of Hohenstaufen and the House of Welf, was over the successor to Emperor Henry VI, who had just died. After a conflict lasting 17 years, the Hohenstaufen Frederick II prevailed.

== Origin ==
On 28 September 1197, Emperor Henry VI, who was just 32 years old, died unexpectedly creating unrest in the circles of the princes about the future direction of the Holy Roman Empire. There were now opposing forces to the hitherto stable position of the Hohenstaufens, as had already been demonstrated by the failure of Henry VI's Erbreichsplan or "plan for hereditary succession". The princes were now faced with the question as to whether they would recognize Henry's son, Frederick II, now only three years old, as successor. Although Frederick had already been elected at the end of 1196 in Frankfurt under the heavy influence of the Archbishop of Mainz, Konrad von Wittelsbach, and Duke of Swabia, Philip, the temptation to switch support away from the former ruling house grew.

== Assumption of office of Pope Innocent III ==
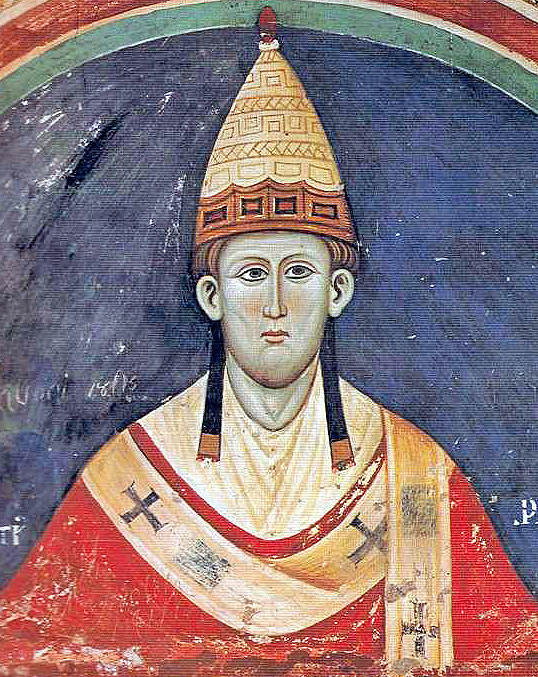
Innocent III. Fresco in Sacro Speco Abbey, c. 1219

While the situation in the empire led to division, 37-year-old Lothar of Segni ascended the throne of St. Peter on 22 February 1198 and became Pope Innocent III, whose powerful personality gave the papal office the power to rule at a whole new level. Its aims were the restoration of sovereign papal rule in Rome and the church state, the recovery of feudal sovereignty over the Kingdom of Sicily, the recovery of the Central Italian lands and the consolidation of the Italian states under the leadership of the Papacy.

Frederick's mother, Queen Constance of Sicily, instigated a political change in southern Italy. She sought closer relations with Rome, dissolved any connection with the rest of the empire, expelled the Germans from her Sicilian empire, renounced the Roman-German kingship of her son, Frederick, and had him crowned King of Sicily in 1198 instead, although keeping her title as empress dowager. Such a policy of separation was entirely after Innocent's heart, but only after he had extracted a concordat from Constance which continued to place the ecclesiastical rights over the Sicilian crown above those of King Tancred's concessions, leaving the king with only the smallest vestige of royal consensus when it came to the election of bishops. Innocent restored the old feudal relationship just in time, after the unexpectedly early death of Constance in 1198, in order now to gain control over the young Frederick as his feudal lord and thus to determine the future of Sicily.

== The double election ==
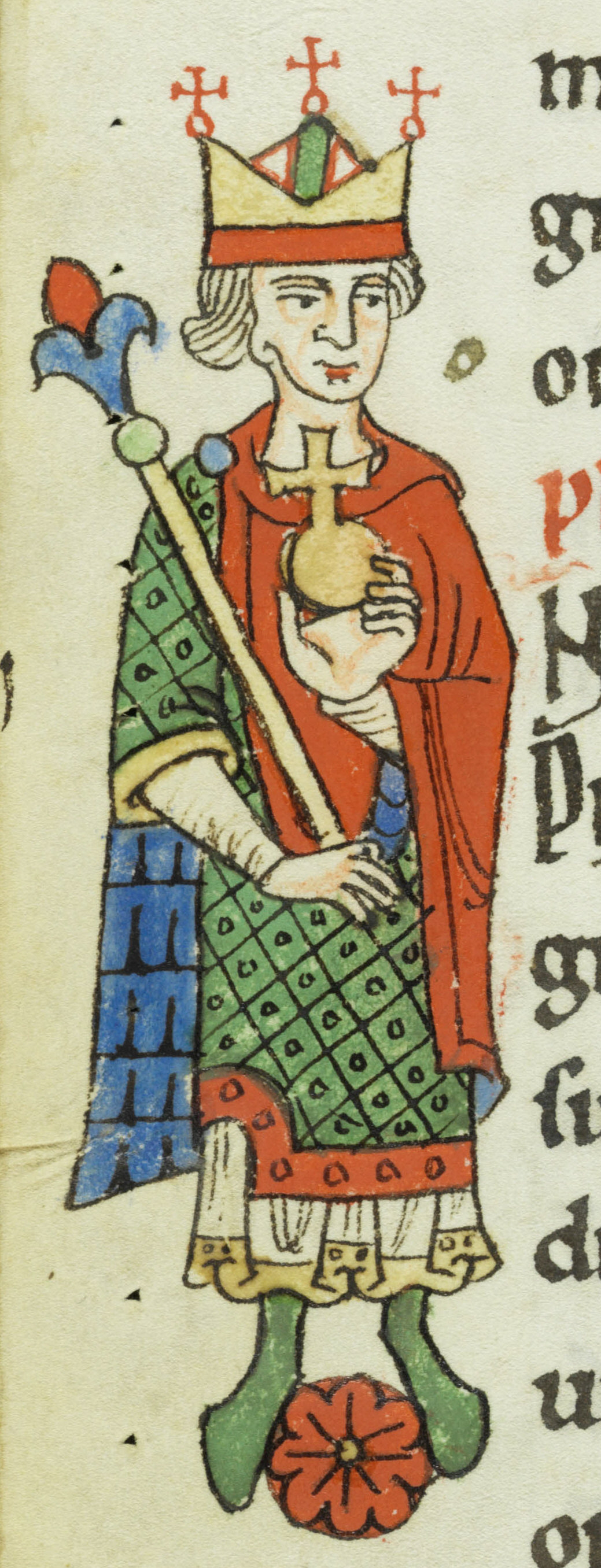
Portrait of Philip of Swabia from a manuscript, c. 1200

After Constance had withdrawn her son Frederick from running for the Roman-German kingship, the princes could not agree whom they should elect as king. The most promising candidate at first was the Duke of Saxony, Bernard III from the House of Ascania, who was able to secure support inter alia from the Archbishop of Cologne, Adolf of Altena. However, the English king, Richard I proposed his nephew, the then Count of Poitou, Otto of Brunswick, who was the son of the Saxon duke, Henry the Lion. The prospect that the Welf Otto could become king induced Bernard and the Saxon princes to side with the younger brother of Henry VI, the Swabian duke, Philip, since it was feared that the Welfs would make claims on the Duchy of Saxony, which they had lost in 1180 at the Hoftag of Gelnhausen. The same was feared by Louis I, Duke of Bavaria from the Wittelsbach lineage. Under pressure from the Saxon princes, Philip of Swabia who, as the uncle of the young Frederick, had only intended to secure the kingdom for his nephew, finally agreed to his own election as king.

Philip of Swabia was elected king at Mühlhausen in Thuringia on 8 March 1198 (Laetare Sunday), by princes sympathetic to the Hohenstaufens. His backing came from Duke Leopold the Glorious Duke of Styria and heir of Austria (the then-present leader of Carantanian-Bavarian Nation), Ottokar I of Bohemia the then Duke of Czechia, the Wittelsbach, Philip's own Alamannian lords as well as from Duke Berthold V of Zähringen, and Landgrave Hermann I of Thuringia, as well as representatives of Saxon princes, and Archbishop Ludolf of Magdeburg and Archbishop Adalbert of Salzburg; however, in the absence of the Archbishops of Cologne, Mainz and Trier, some of which were customary participants. There were yet no established procedure and authorities for the election, but the 'consuetudines' mattered.

But the anti-Hohenstaufen princes were not prepared to accept this. So on 9 June, they elected Otto of Brunswick as counter-king to Philip of Swabia, who had been elected but not yet crowned, making the dispute official. Otto's coronation took place on 12 July in Cologne, while Philip was crowned on 8 September.

Thus there were simultaneously two kings, but in both cases neither the election nor the coronation followed the ancient, traditional process. Philip had received the coronation regalia - the Imperial Crown, the Imperial Orb and Imperial Sword - but his election took place on non-customary place and soil, in Thuringian Mühlhausen (although it can be said that there was a precedent from 1135 when Philip's great-uncle Conrad was proclaimed King at the place). Moreover, his coronation took place neither at the 'right place', that is, in Mainz or Aachen, nor under the 'right authority' because he was crowned by the Burgundian Archbishop Aymon II of Tarentaise and not the archbishop of Cologne. Otto's election and coronation took place in the right places, Cologne and Aachen, and his coronation was carried out by the Archbishop of Cologne, but only with a substituted set of regalia. Thus neither Philip nor Otto had full legitimacy to rule the monarchy.

Pope Innocent III was of the opinion that the pope was the one to whom spiritual and temporal princes would have to submit, and that therefore he should decide the question of who sat on the throne. But he was clearly waiting for the outcome of the power struggle. He was, however, well informed of events by his papal legate-bishop, Radulf of Sutri, who was in the throes of negotiating with Philip a solution to his excommunication. There are indications that there were differences of opinion between the Hohenstaufens and the Pope over the question of the position of Sicily in the empire. Philip obviously did not share the view of his sister-in-law about the feudal dependence of Sicily on the Pope, and was therefore unwilling to regard the kingdom as a papal fief. Innocent inevitably now sided with the Welfs, which gave him the opportunity to intervene with the election announcement of April 1199. After the death of the English king and most powerful advocate of the Welfs, Richard I, Otto was all the more dependent on the support of the Pope. On 28 May 1199, the Hohenstaufen party also presented their petition to the Pope at the Princes' Declaration of Speyer. This was supported by a clear majority of the supporters of Philip and assured that the rights of the Church were to be respected if, in return, the rights of the emperor were respected by the Church. In addition, Philip's forthcoming visit to Rome for his imperial coronation was announced.

== Innocent's decision ==
Innocent III now abandoned his restraint and, on 3 May 1199, announced that he would soon decide to whom he would grant papal favour. On 20 May 1199, he declared to the Archbishop of Cologne and the other signatories of Otto's letter of recommendation that he would support the Welf king, if the latter showed himself to be loyal to the church. For Otto, the road to an alliance with the Roman Curia was now open. The political interests of the papacy were crucial to this decision, for Otto had now to back his earlier assurances with documentary evidence, not least the continuing excommunication of Philip.

The pope now intervened energetically in the dispute, banned Philip and his followers including the signatories of the Speyer Declaration, and proceeded with all severity against them. The Hohenstaufen party reacted with a violent protest at several Hoftage and rejected the interference of the pope in the German election as an unheard-of process. At the end of March 1202, Innocent sent another letter in which he summarized and justified his papal rights and claims. This letter had been incorporated into Church law and was therefore called the Decretale Venerabilem. This justified the right of the Pope to reject a king who was inappropriate from a spiritual perspective. He thereby intervened in German constitutional law. In the end it became apparent how difficult it was to reconcile contradictory claims and political and ideological positions.

In 1202/03, Otto's power increased through conquests, agreements and alliances as well as the support of a number of secular princes. But it soon became apparent that these successes were just illusory, and a lack of loyalty deprived him of support and created adversaries. Through disagreements and losses of power in the east, his own brother, Count Palatine Henry, deserted him, as did even Adolf of Cologne, the creator of his kingdom. When Philip advanced on the Lower Rhine, the Archbishop crowned him on 6 January 1205, after another election. After several threats, Adolf of Cologne was removed from office by Innocent III and excommunicated. New archepiscopal elections were immediately launched. Since Otto had lost Cologne in November 1206, and had been in Brunswick shortly before the defeat, Innocent found himself forced to make a compromise with Philip. However, just before the conclusion of a treaty, Philip was murdered 21 June 1208 in Bamberg by the Count Palatine Otto of Wittelsbach as the result of a private feud.

The murder of the king fundamentally changed the course of German history. Pope Innocent III viewed the event as God's judgment and confirmation of the validity of his decision in the throne controversy. Without a counter-king and intent on marrying Philip's eldest daughter (Philip had no male heirs), Otto IV suddenly became the undisputed ruler of the united kingdom. Otto's kingship was recognized in an election on 11 November 1208 in Frankfurt am Main. The Welf king declared that he wished to subject his claim to the throne entirely to the advice and will of the Pope, and renewed and even extended his earlier vows from the Speyer Declaration of 22 March 1209.

== Otto's betrayal ==
Thus the way was clear for Otto's imperial coronation, which took place on 4 October. But Innocent had been greatly deceived by the new emperor. Otto began, shortly after his coronation, attempting to recover the estates transferred to the Papacy, especially those of Matilda of Tuscany, going against his pledges. During the course of 1210, the conflict deepened. When the Welf emperor was about to attack Sicily in the middle of November, with the aim of restoring the situation to that of 1197, Pope Innocent imposed the imperial ban on Otto and released his subjects from their oaths of loyalty. The Pope was now compelled, with the support of the King of France and the German princes, to find a new heir to the throne. Only Frederick of Sicily was in the running. This meant Pope Innocent now had to accept another member of a dynasty which he had hitherto demonized as a family of persecutors of the Church, and feared Sicily joining the Empire. But he had some control, since he was the overlord of Sicily. This Frederick acknowledged; even if he were crowned emperor, he acquiesced that this overlord-vassal relationship should remain the same. Frederick's one-year-old son, Henry, was crowned King of Sicily at the request of the Pope, and Innocent thus received a kind of insurance. But this policy made Innocent unpopular. Walther von der Vogelweide speaks in his poetry about the duplicity of the Curia and the secularisation of the Church.

== Frederick's ascent to the throne ==
The first successful outcome of the papal counteraction was that Otto left Sicily in October 1211 and returned to Germany, because his position in the Empire had become fragile. But his troops continued to occupy Sicily.

Frederick went to Rome to swear his oath of loyalty to his overlord, the Pope, in person, was supported financially by the Pope with money, and with his consent proclaimed King of the Romans and the future Emperor. Frederick complied in every way with the wishes of the Pope and was declared a king and a chosen emperor "of God and of the Pope," which also reflected the actual political balance of power. In September 1212 he was able to set foot in Constance and gather his followers around him. Once again, civil war broke out in Germany. Once more, as Walther von der Vogelweide sang "the Pope had placed two Germans under one crown, bringing disunity and devastation across the Empire."

Frederick owed his success to his membership of the House of Hohenstaufen, to Papal command and French support. On 5 December 1212, he was formally re-elected as king in Frankfurt by a great assembly of princes and crowned four days later in Mainz.

== The outcome ==
The outcome of the throne contest was decided on a foreign battlefield. Otto supported his English uncle, King John, in the conflict between England and France over English lands on mainland Europe. On 27 July 1214, Philip II August, without the participation of his ally, Frederick, gained a brilliant victory over Otto at the Battle of Bouvines. Otto IV never recovered from this defeat, his remaining allies deserted him, and he died on the Harzburg on 19 May 1218.

Frederick's rise to power was completed on 25 July 1215, in Aachen, when he once again crowned himself king; this time at the right place. He had long before paid the price for the Pope's support of his bid for the throne. On 12 July 1213, he had granted a great privilege to the Church: the Golden Bull of Eger, in which he once again recorded in writing the concessions he had already made to the Curia. It included recognition of the freedom of episcopal elections, the lands recovered by the Papacy, the Pope's sovereignty over Sicily, and the assurance of aid against heretics. This was now no longer a secret agreement, but was reiterated in the form of a solemn privilege signed by princes and imperial ministeriales.

== Literature ==
- Egon Boshof: Innozenz III. und der deutsche Thronstreit. In: Thomas Frenz (ed.): Papst Innozenz III. Weichensteller der Geschichte Europas. Steiner, Stuttgart, 2000, ISBN 3-515-07433-3, pp. 51–67.
- Peter Csendes: Philipp von Schwaben. Ein Staufer im Kampf um die Macht. Primus-Verlag, Darmstadt, 2003, ISBN 3-89678-458-7.
- Bernd Ulrich Hucker: Otto IV. Der wiederentdeckte Kaiser (= Insel-Taschenbuch. 2557). Insel-Verlag, Frankfurt etc., 2003, ISBN 3-458-34257-5.
- Alois Gerlich: Könige, Fürsten, Adel und Städte am Mittelrhein und in Franken zwischen Thronstreit und Mainzer Reichslandfrieden 1198–1235 (= Quellen und Forschungen zur hessischen Geschichte. Vol. 127). Self publication by the Hessian Historical Commission et al., Darmstadt etc., 2001, ISBN 3-88443-079-3.
- Reinhold Schneider: Innozenz der Dritte (= dtv. 116, ZDB-ID 986583-4). Deutscher Taschenbuch-Verlag, Munich, 1963.
- Wolfgang Stürner: Dreizehntes Jahrhundert. 1198–1273 (= Gebhardt. Handbuch der deutschen Geschichte. Vol. 6). 10th fully revised edition. Klett-Cotta, Stuttgart, 2007, ISBN 978-3-608-60006-3, pp. 156 ff.
