= Otto IV, Holy Roman Emperor =

Holy Roman Emperor from 1209 to 1218

Otto IV
- Imperator Romanorum
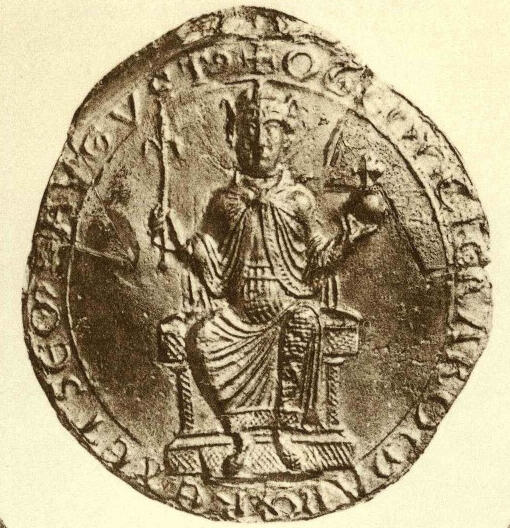
- Seal of Otto IV

Holy Roman Emperor
- Reign: 1209–1215
- Coronation: 4 October 1209, Rome
- Predecessor: Henry VI
- Successor: Frederick II

King of the Romans
- Reign: 1198–1209
- Coronation: 12 July 1198, Aachen
- Predecessor: Henry VI
- Successor: Frederick II

King of Italy
- Reign: 1208–1212
- Predecessor: Henry VI
- Successor: Henry VII (Note: Although Frederick II was crowned King of the Romans, King of Sicily, King of Jerusalem and Holy Roman Emperor, he was never crowned King of Italy at Pavia, Monza or Milan during his lifetime – see Sismondi's History of the Italian Republics in the Middle Ages, (1906), pp. 143, 147; and Kington-Oliphant's, History of Frederick the Second, Emperor of the Romans, Vol I, (1862), p. 195, which specifically state that the Milanese refused to crown Frederick with the Iron Crown. Neither is his coronation as King of Italy mentioned in any modern source, such as Abulafia's, The New Cambridge Medieval History, Vol. V: c. 1198 – c. 1300, (1999))

King of Burgundy
- Reign: 1208–1215
- Predecessor: Philip of Swabia
- Successor: Frederick II
- Born: 1175
- Died: 19 May 1218 (aged 42–43); Harzburg
- Burial: Brunswick Cathedral
- Spouses: Beatrice of Hohenstaufen (m. 1209 or 1212; d. 1212); Maria of Brabant (m. 1214)
- House: Welf
- Father: Henry the Lion
- Mother: Matilda of England

Otto IV (1175 – 19 May 1218) was the Holy Roman Emperor from 1209 until his death in 1218.

Otto spent most of his early life in England and France. He was a follower of his uncle Richard the Lionheart, who made him Count of Poitou in 1196. With Richard's support, he was elected King of Germany by one faction in a disputed election in 1198, sparking ten years of civil war. The death of his rival, Philip of Swabia, in 1208 left him sole king of Germany.

In 1209, Otto marched to Italy to be crowned emperor by Pope Innocent III. In 1210, he sought to unite the Kingdom of Sicily with the Empire, breaking with Innocent, who excommunicated him. He allied with England against France and participated in the alliance's defeat at Bouvines in 1214. He was abandoned by most of his supporters in 1215 and lived the rest of his life in retirement on his estates near Brunswick. He was the only German king of the Welf dynasty.

== Career ==
=== Early life ===
Otto was the third son of Henry the Lion, Duke of Bavaria and Duke of Saxony, by his wife Matilda of England. His exact birthplace is not given by any original source. (Note: The Catholic Encyclopedia Kampers, Franz (1911). "Otto IV" . In Herbermann, Charles (ed.). Catholic Encyclopedia. Vol. 11. New York: Robert Appleton Company. gives his birthplace as Argentan in Normandy, which was one of the royal courts of Matilda's father, Henry II of England. This is based upon Otto's birthdate being circa 1182, and placing it during his father's exile from Germany at the court of his father-in-law.) He grew up in England in the care of his maternal grandfather, King Henry II of England. Otto was fluent in French as well as German. He became the foster son of his maternal uncle King Richard I of England. In 1190, after he left England to join the Third Crusade, Richard appointed Otto as Earl of York. This grant's authenticity (or authority) was doubted by the vassals of Yorkshire, who prevented Otto from taking possession of his earldom. Still, he probably visited Yorkshire in 1191, and he continued to claim the revenues of the earldom after becoming king of Germany, although he never secured them. Neither did he succeed in getting the 25,000 silver marks willed to him by his uncle in 1199.

In 1195, Richard began negotiations to marry Otto to Margaret, daughter and heir presumptive of King William the Lion of Scotland. Lothian, as Margaret's dowry, would be handed over to Richard for safekeeping and the counties of Northumberland and Cumberland (Carlisle) would be granted to Otto and turned over to the king of Scotland. The negotiations dragged on until August 1198, when the birth of a son and heir to William rendered them unnecessary. Having failed to secure Otto an English earldom or a Scottish kingdom in September 1196, Richard, as duke of Aquitaine, enfeoffed Otto with the county of Poitou. There is some disagreement over whether Otto received Poitou in exchange for or in addition to the earldom of York.

Otto was in Poitou from September 1196 until mid-1197, when he joined Richard in Normandy to confer over the appointment of bishops to the vacant sees of Poitiers, Limoges and Périgueux. He then participated in the war against Philip II of France on the side of Richard. In October, he returned to Poitou. The German historian Jens Ahlers, considering Otto's life before 1198, believes that he might have been the first foreign king of Germany.

=== Conflict with Philip of Swabia ===
Otto's three crowns (Burgundy, Germany, Italy) and two coats of arms, as depicted by Matthew Paris

After the death of Emperor Henry VI, the majority of the princes of the Empire, situated in the south, elected Henry's brother Philip king in March 1198, after receiving money and promises from Philip in exchange for their support. But those princes opposed to the Hohenstaufen dynasty decided, on the initiative of Richard of England, to elect instead a member of the House of Welf. Otto's elder brother, Henry, was participating in the Crusade of 1197 at the time, and so the choice fell to Otto. Otto, soon recognized throughout the northwest and the lower Rhine region, was elected king by his partisans in Cologne on 9 June 1198.

Otto took control of Aachen, the place of coronation, and was crowned by Archbishop Adolf of Cologne on 12 July 1198. This was of great symbolic importance, since the archbishop of Cologne alone could crown the king of the Romans. The coronation was done with fake imperial regalia, because the actual materials were in the hands of the Hohenstaufen.

Otto's election pulled the empire into the conflict between England and France. Philip had allied himself with the French king, Philip II, while Otto was supported at first by Richard I, and after he died in 1199 by his brother John.

The papacy meanwhile, under Innocent III, determined to prevent the continued unification of Sicily and the Holy Roman Empire under one monarch seized the opportunity to extend its influence. Therefore, Innocent III favoured Otto, whose family had always opposed the house of Hohenstaufen. Otto also seemed willing to grant any demands that Innocent would make. The confusion in the empire allowed Innocent to drive out the imperial feudal lords from Ancona, Spoleto, and Perugia, who had been installed by Emperor Henry VI.

At the same time, Innocent encouraged the cities in Tuscany to form a league, called the League of San Genesio, against imperial interests in Italy. The cities placed themselves under Innocent's protection. In 1201, Innocent announced that he recognized Otto as the only legitimate king. In return, Otto promised to support the pope's interests in Italy. Otto also had the support of Ottokar I of Bohemia, who, although at first siding with Philip of Swabia, eventually threw in his lot with Otto. Otto's cause was further strengthened by the support of Valdemar II of Denmark. Philip achieved a great deal of success in the civil war that followed, allowing him in 1204 to be again crowned king, this time by the archbishop of Cologne.

In the following years, Otto's situation worsened because, after England's defeat by France, he lost England's financial support. Many of his allies changed sides to Philip, including his brother Henry. Otto was defeated and wounded in the battle of Wassenberg by Philip on 27 July 1206, and as a consequence, he also lost the support of the pope, who began to favour the apparent winner in the conflict. Otto was forced to retire to his possessions near Brunswick, leaving Philip virtually uncontested as German king.

Innocent III forced the two warring parties into negotiations at Cologne, and in exchange for renouncing his claim to the throne, Philip promised Otto the hand of his daughter Beatrix in marriage, together with the Duchy of Swabia and an enormous dowry. Otto refused, and as the civil war was again about to recommence, Philip was murdered on 21 June 1208.

After Philip's death, Otto made amends with the Staufen party and became engaged to Philip's daughter Beatrix. In the 1208 imperial election in Frankfurt on 11 November 1208, he gained the support of all the electoral princes, as he promised he would not make hereditary claims to the imperial crown on behalf of any children he might father. Now fully reconciled with Innocent, Otto made preparations to be crowned Holy Roman Emperor. To secure Innocent's support, he promised to restore to the Papal States all territory that it had possessed under Louis the Pious, including the March of Ancona, the Duchy of Spoleto, the former Exarchate of Ravenna, and the Pentapolis.

Travelling down via Verona, Modena, and Bologna, he eventually arrived at Milan, where he received the Iron Crown of Lombardy and the title of King of Italy in 1208. He was met at Viterbo by Pope Innocent and was taken to St. Peter's Basilica, where he was crowned emperor by Pope Innocent on 4 October 1209, before rioting broke out in Rome, forcing Otto to abandon the city.

=== Conflict with Innocent III ===
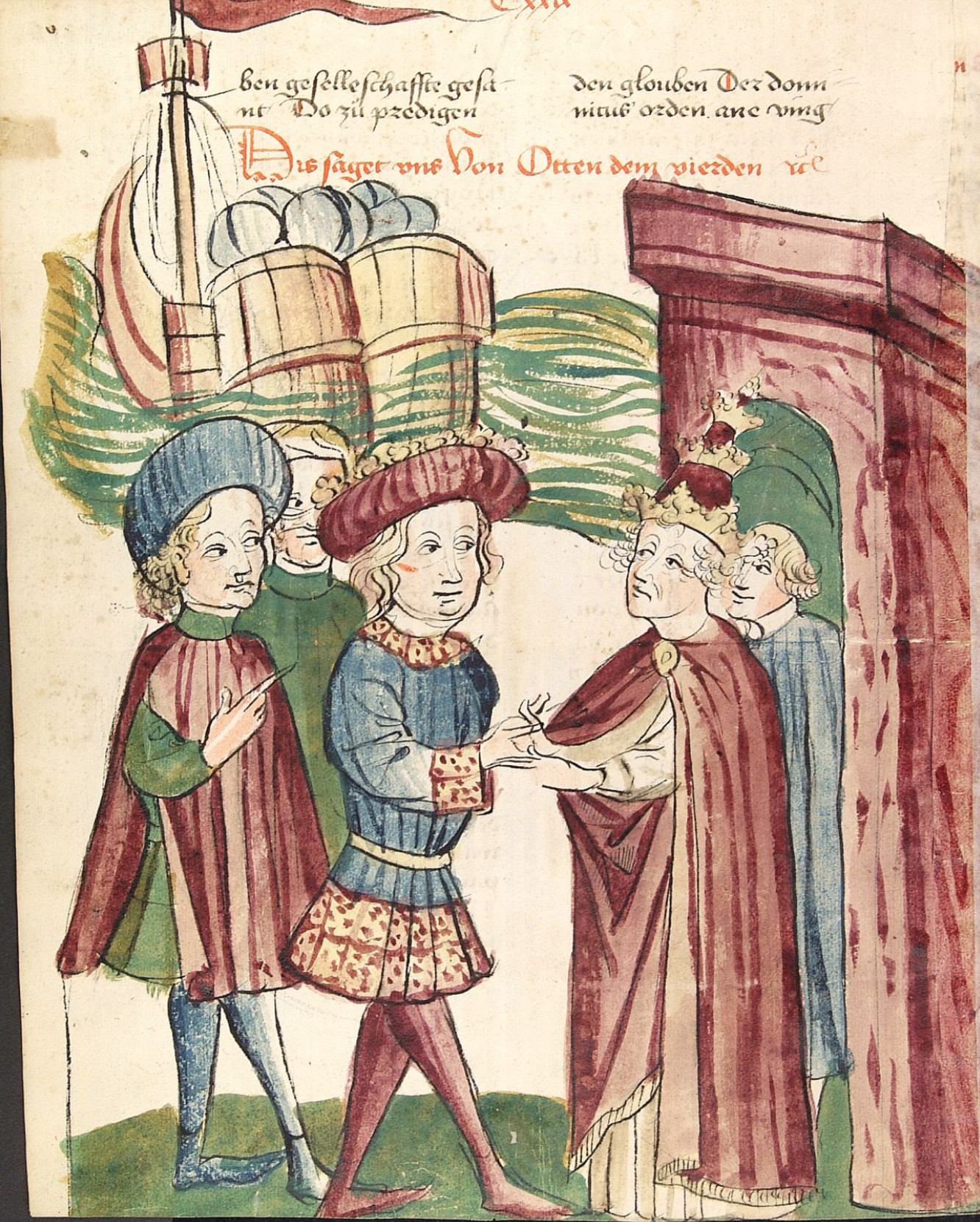
Otto IV and Pope Innocent III shake hands

Not content with his successes so far, Innocent also obtained from Otto further written concessions to the Papal See, including allowing all elections of German bishops to be conducted according to Church ordinances and not to prevent any appeals to Rome. He also promised to hand over to the church all income from any vacant sees that had been flowing into the imperial treasury.

After abandoning Rome, Otto marched north, reaching Pisa by 20 November. Here, probably advised by Peter of Celano and Dipold, Count of Acerra, he was convinced to abandon his earlier promises. Otto immediately worked to restore imperial power in Italy. After his consecration by the pope, he promised to restore the lands bequeathed to the church by the countess Matilda of Tuscany nearly a century before and not to move against Frederick, King of Sicily. He quickly broke all his promises.

He threw out the papal troops from Ancona and Spoleto, reclaiming the territory as imperial fiefs. He then demanded that Frederick of Sicily do homage for the duchies of Calabria and Apulia, and when Frederick refused to appear, Otto declared those fiefs forfeited. Otto then marched on Rome. He commanded Innocent to annul the Concordat of Worms and to recognise the imperial crown's right to make nominations to all vacant benefices.

Such actions infuriated Innocent, who promptly excommunicated Otto on 18 November 1210. Subsequently, he tried to conquer Sicily, which was held by the Staufen king Frederick, under the guardianship of Innocent III. Parallel to this, the German nobility grew increasingly frustrated with Otto. They felt that instead of wasting his time in Italy and playing power politics with the pope, it was his first duty to defend the northern provinces of the empire against Valdemar II of Denmark, who had taken advantage of Otto's distractions by invading the northern provinces of the empire and possessing the whole Baltic coast from Holstein to Livonia. So while Otto was in southern Italy, several princes of the empire, including the archbishops of Mainz and Magdeburg, at the instigation of King Philip II of France and with the consent of the pope, elected Frederick King of the Romans at the Diet of Nuremberg in 1211.

Otto's ambassadors from Milan appeared before the Fourth Lateran Council, pleading the case for his excommunication to be lifted. Although he claimed he had repented for his offences and declared his willingness to be obedient to the Pope in all things, Innocent III had already recognised Frederick as emperor-elect.

Otto returned to Germany to deal with the situation, hopeful of salvaging something from the looming disaster. He found most of the German princes and bishops had turned against him and that Frederick, who had made his way up the Italian peninsula, had avoided Otto's men who were guarding the passes through the Alps and had arrived at Constance. Otto soon discovered that after Beatrix died in the summer of 1212 and Frederick arrived in Germany with his army in September 1212, most of his former Staufen supporters deserted him for Frederick, forcing Otto to withdraw to Cologne. On 5 December 1212, Frederick was elected king for a second time by a majority of the princes.

The support that Philip II of France gave to Frederick forced King John of England to throw his weight behind his nephew, Otto. The destruction of the French fleet in 1213 by the English saw John begin preparations for an invasion of France; in this, Otto saw a way of both destroying Frederick's French support and bolstering his prestige. He agreed to join John in the invasion, and in February 1214, as John advanced from the Loire, Otto, together with the Count of Flanders, was supposed to make a simultaneous attack from Flanders. Unfortunately, the three armies could not coordinate their efforts effectively. It was not until John, who had been disappointed in his hope for an easy victory after being driven from Roche-au-Moine, had retreated to his transports that the Imperial Army, with Otto at its head, assembled in the Low Countries.

On 27 July 1214, the opposing armies suddenly discovered they were close to each other, on the banks of the little river Marque (a tributary of the river Deûle), near the Bridge of Bouvines. Philip's army numbered some 15,000, while the allied forces possessed around 25,000 troops; the armies clashed at the Battle of Bouvines. It was a tight battle, but it was lost when Otto was carried off the field by his wounded and terrified horse, causing his forces to abandon the field. It is said that Philip II had sent to Frederick the Imperial Eagle, which Otto had left lying on the battlefield.

Because Otto was forced again to withdraw to his private possessions around Brunswick, this defeat allowed Frederick to take Aachen and Cologne, and so Otto was deposed in 1215.

== Death ==
Otto spent the last years of his life between the Harz Mountains and the heathlands. In early May 1218, Otto was staying at Harliburg Castle, where he fell ill with severe diarrhea. On May 13, Otto was taken to Harzburg. Shortly before his death, Otto had his will drawn up. His brother Heinrich was named principal heir and executor of the will. Heinrich received the imperial regalia with the instruction to hand them over to the next elected king after a waiting period. Otto died on 19 May 1218.

== Family ==
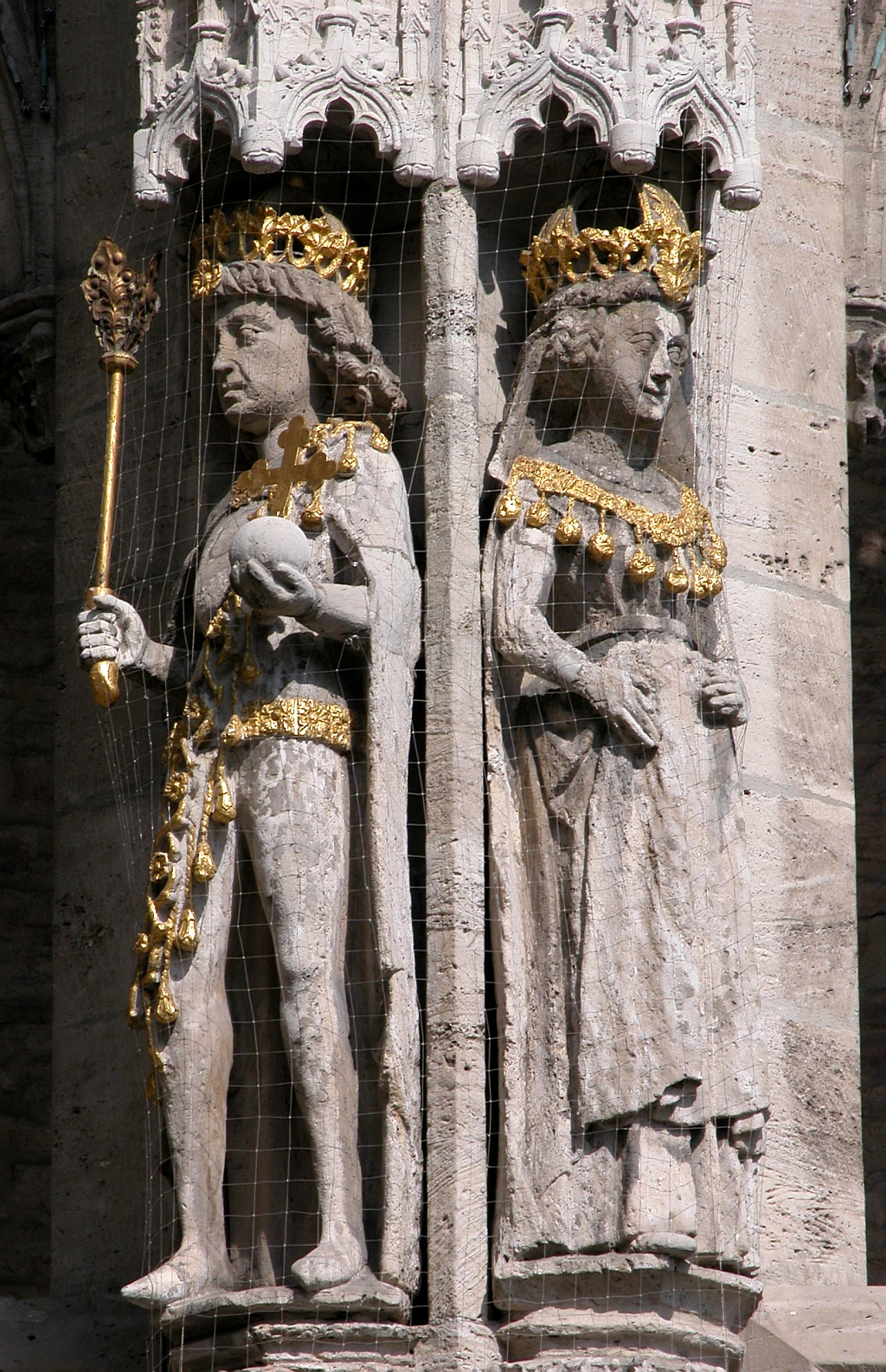
Statues of Otto IV & Maria of Brabant, old city hall, Braunschweig, c. 1455.

Otto was related to every other King of Germany. He married twice:

1. 1209 or 1212 to Beatrice of Swabia, daughter of the German King Philip of Swabia and Irene Angelina.
2. 19 May 1214, in Aachen to Maria of Brabant, daughter of Henry I, Duke of Brabant, and Matilda of Boulogne.

Neither marriage produced any children.

== Notes ==
Otto IV, Holy Roman Emperor House of Welf Died: May 19 1218
Regnal titles
Preceded by Henry VI	King of Germany; 1198–1209 with Philip as contender (1198–1208)	Succeeded by Frederick II
Preceded by Henry VI	Holy Roman Emperor; 1209–1215 with Frederick II as anti-king (1212–1215)	Succeeded by Frederick II
Preceded by Richard I	Count of Poitou; 1196–1198	Succeeded by Richard I
