= Philip of Swabia =

King of Germany from 1198 to 1208

Philip
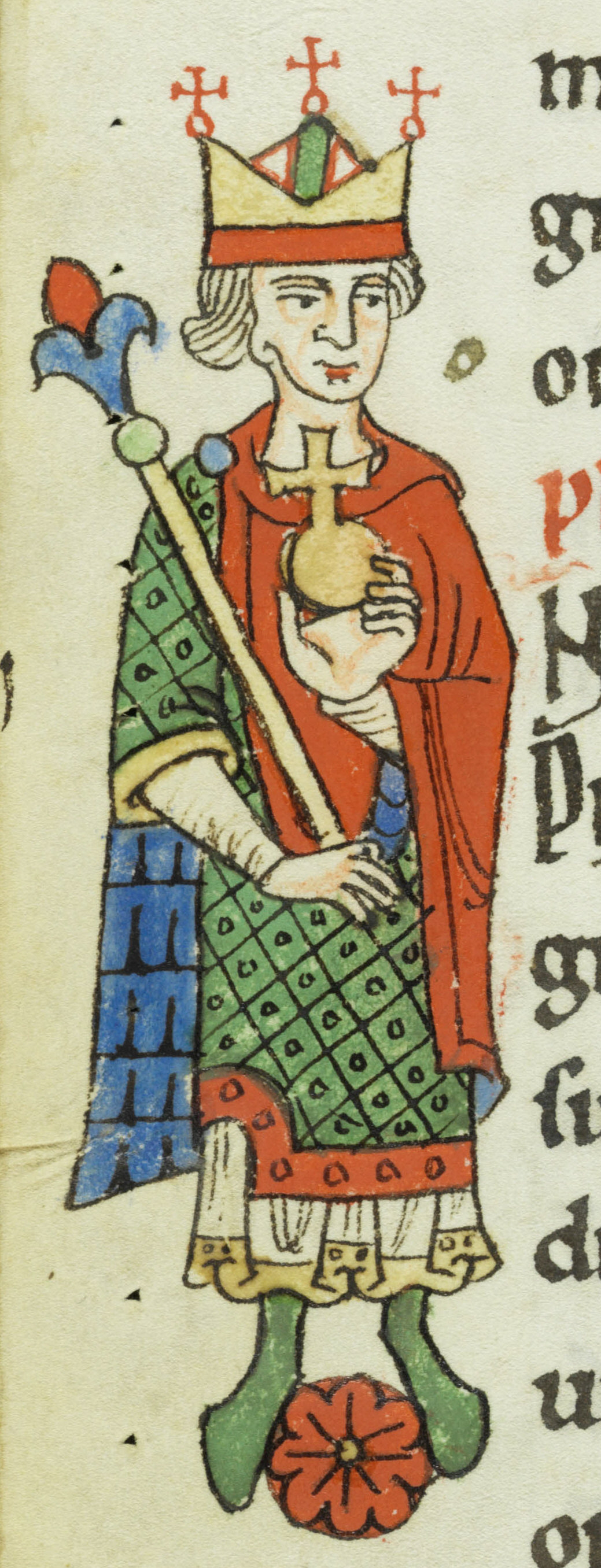
- Philip of Swabia with the Imperial Regalia, miniature in the Chronicle of Weissenau Abbey, ca. 1250. Kantonsbibliothek St. Gallen (Vadiana Collection, Ms. 321, p. 40.)

King of the Romans King of Germany
- Reign: 8 March 1198 – 21 June 1208
- Coronation: 8 September 1198, Mainz
- Predecessor: Henry VI
- Successor: Otto IV

Duke of Swabia
- Reign: 15 August 1196 – 21 June 1208
- Predecessor: Conrad II
- Successor: Frederick II, Holy Roman Emperor
- Born: February/March 1177; Pavia, Italy
- Died: 21 June 1208 (aged 31); Bamberg, Franconia, Germany
- Burial: Speyer Cathedral
- Spouse: Irene Angelina (m. 1197)
- Issue: Beatrix, Holy Roman Empress; Maria; Kunigunde, Queen of Bohemia; Elisabeth, Queen of Castile
- House: Hohenstaufen
- Father: Frederick I, Holy Roman Emperor
- Mother: Beatrice I, Countess of Burgundy

Philip of Swabia (German: Philipp von Schwaben; February/March 1177 – 21 June 1208), styled Philip II (Note: Although never crowned emperor, Philip generally added an ordinal number to his name, making him Philippus Secundus, as if he were the successor to Philip the Arab (Roman emperor AD 244–249). Historian Andrea Rhizacek notes that "styling himself Philip II he obviously counted himself as a ruler in a line of emperors, not kings".) in his charters, was a member of the House of Hohenstaufen and King of Germany from 1198 until his assassination.

The death of Philip's older brother Henry VI, Holy Roman Emperor, in 1197 meant that the Hohenstaufen rule (which reached as far as the Kingdom of Sicily) collapsed in imperial Italy and created a power vacuum to the north of the Alps. Reservations about the kingship of Henry's underage son, Frederick, led to two royal elections in 1198, which resulted in the German throne dispute: the two elected kings, Philip of Swabia and Otto of Brunswick, claimed the throne for themselves. Both opponents tried in the following years through European and papal support, with the help of money and gifts, through demonstrative public appearances and rituals, to decide the conflict for oneself by raising ranks or by military and diplomatic measures. Philip was able to increasingly assert his kingship against Otto in the north part of the Alps. However, at the height of his power, he was assassinated in 1208. This ended the dispute for the throne; his opponent Otto quickly found recognition. Philip was the first German king to be murdered during his reign.

== Life ==
=== Early years ===
Philip was born in or near Pavia in the Imperial Kingdom of Italy as the tenth child and eighth (but fifth and youngest surviving) son of Frederick Barbarossa, King of Germany and Holy Roman Emperor and his second wife Beatrice I, Countess of Burgundy. His paternal family was the noble House of Hohenstaufen, the name given to the dynasty by historians since the 15th century. The origins of the family are still unclear today; the ancestors on the paternal side were minor nobles and their names have not been preserved. All that is known about Barbarossa's great-grandfather Frederick of Büren is that he married a woman named Hildegard (whose own parentage was disputed: she was a member of either the Comital family of Egisheim–Dagsburg or the obscure Schlettstadt family). A few years ago it was assumed that the Schlettstadt property did not belong to Hildegard but to her husband himself and the Hohenstaufen were therefore not a Swabian but an Alsatian family. It wasn't until around 1100 that the family under Duke Frederick I of Swabia located into the East Swabian Rems valley. (Note: In favor of the Alsacian origin of the Hohenstaufen: Daniel Ziemann, Die Staufer – Ein elsässisches Adelsgeschlecht? In: Hubertus Seibert, Jürgen Dendorfer (ed.): Grafen, Herzöge, Könige. Der Aufstieg der Staufer und das Reich 1079–1152, Ostfildern 2005, pp. 99–133 (in German). Rejecting the Alsacian origin: Eduard Hlawitschka, Die Staufer: kein schwäbisches, sondern ein elsässisches Adelsgeschlecht? In: Zeitschrift für Württembergische Landesgeschichte 66, 2007, pp. 63–79 (in German).)

Much more important for the Hohenstaufen family was the prestigious connection with the Salian dynasty. Frederick Barbarossa's grandmother was Agnes, a daughter of Henry IV, Holy Roman Emperor. Philip's father saw himself as a direct descendant of the first Salian ruler Conrad II, to whom he referred several times as his ancestor in documents. After the extinction of the Salian dynasty in the male line in 1125 firstly Frederick II, Duke of Swabia (Barbarossa's father) and then his brother Conrad tried in vain to claim the royal dignity invoking his descent from the Salians. In 1138, Conrad III was finally elected King of Germany, being the first scion of the Swabian Hohenstaufen dynasty to be elected King of the Romans, against the fierce resistance of the rival House of Welf. In 1152 the royal dignity passed smoothly to Conrad III's nephew, Frederick Barbarossa, who was also Holy Roman Emperor from 1155 onwards. Barbarossa became embroiled in a conflict with Pope Alexander III. It was not until 1177 that the long-standing conflict of the Emperor with the Pope and the Italian cities of the Lombard League could be resolved in the Treaty of Venice.

The Hohenstaufen had never used the name Philip before. The prince was named after the Archbishop Philip of Cologne, who was an important helper and confidante of Barbarossa at this time. The name of the Archbishop of Cologne was thus accepted into a royal family. For historian Gerd Althoff, this demonstrative honor makes "Barbarossa's preparations for the confrontation with Henry the Lion tangible". A little later, the Archbishop of Cologne played a key role in the overthrow of the powerful Duke of Bavaria and Saxony.

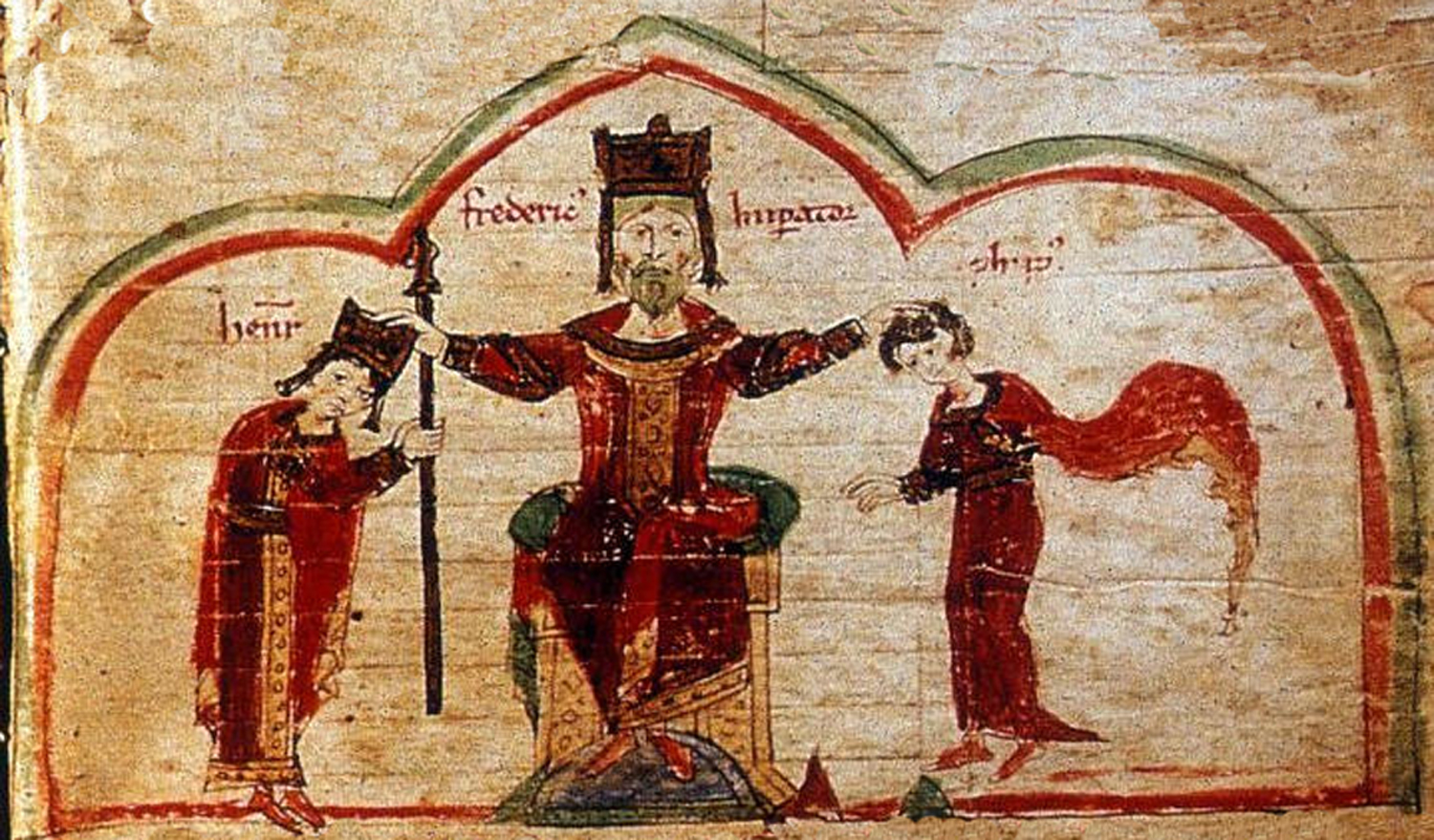
Frederick Barbarossa with his sons Henry and Philip, from Peter of Eboli Liber ad honorem Augusti, 1196. Burgerbibliothek of Berne, Codex 120 II, fol. 143r.

As a child, Philip was initially prepared for an ecclesiastical career. He learned to read and also learned Latin, and was placed at the Premonstratensian Monastery in Adelberg for his further education. From April 1189 to July 1193 Philip was provost at the collegiate church of Aachen Cathedral, while his father left Germany for the Third Crusade in 1189, but he drowned in the Göksu (Saleph) River in Anatolia the next year. In 1190 or 1191 Philip was elected Prince-bishop of Würzburg, though without being consecrated, probably due to intervention of his brother Henry VI. In 1186 Henry VI married with Constance, the aunt of the reigning King William II of Sicily; this gave the Hohenstaufen the possibility of a union of the Kingdom of Sicily with the Holy Roman Empire (unio regni ad imperium). As a result, however, the relationship with the Pope deteriorated, because the Holy See wanted to maintain the feudal claim over the Kingdom of Sicily. In the spring of 1193 Philip forsook his ecclesiastical calling, perhaps because of the childlessness of the imperial couple; also, Philip's three other brothers were also without male heirs: Duke Frederick VI of Swabia had already died in 1191 and Conrad of Rothenburg, who succeeded him as Duke of Swabia, was unmarried. In addition, Otto I, Count Palatine of Burgundy, although already married, had no male descendants yet. However, the concerns of the imperial couple turned out to be unfounded. Empress Constance gave birth to a son on 26 December 1194 in Jesi, the later Frederick II, Holy Roman Emperor. While the Emperor was absent, the princes elected his two-year-old son Frederick as King of the Romans in Frankfurt at the end of 1196; with this move, Henry VI wanted to see his succession secured before he prepared for the Crusade of 1197.

To improve relationships with the Byzantine Empire, in April 1195 Henry VI betrothed Philip to Irene Angelina, a daughter of Emperor Isaac II and the widow of junior King Roger III of Sicily, a lady who was described by Walther von der Vogelweide as "the rose without a thorn, the dove without guile": she was among those taken prisoner by Henry VI when he invaded Sicily in 1194. In early 1195, Philip accompanied his imperial brother on his journey to Sicily and at Easter 1195 he was made Margrave of Tuscany, receiving the disputed Matildine lands; in his retinue in Italy was the Minnesinger Bernger von Horheim. Philip's rule in Tuscany there earned him the enmity of Pope Celestine III, who excommunicated him. On 3 May 1196, Philip was documented for the last time as Margrave of Tuscany. After the murder of his brother Conrad in August 1196, Philip succeeded him as Duke of Swabia. The marriage of Philip and Irene Angelina (renamed Maria upon her wedding) probably took place at Pentecost (25 May) 1197 in the Gunzenle hill near Augsburg. Five daughters were certainly born from the union:

- Beatrix (April/June 1198 – 11 August 1212), who married her father's rival, Emperor Otto IV on 22 July 1212 and died three weeks later without issue.
- Maria (1199/1200 – 29 March 1235), who married the future Duke Henry II of Brabant before 22 August 1215 and had issue.
- Kunigunde (February/March 1202 – 13 September 1248), who married King Wenceslaus I of Bohemia in 1224 and had issue.
- Elisabeth (March/May 1205 – 5 November 1235), who married King Ferdinand III of Castile on 30 November 1219 and had issue.
- Daughter (Note: Named Beatrix Posthuma in some articles and genealogical websites;1 however, the primary source which confirms her name has not yet been identified.) (posthumously born and died 20/27 August 1208). She and her mother died following childbirth complications.

Sources identified two short-lived sons, Reinald and Frederick, also born from the union of Philip and Irene-Maria Angelina, being both buried at Lorch Abbey alongside their mother. However, there were no contemporary sources who could ascertain their existence without doubt.

=== Struggle for the throne ===
==== Outbreak of the conflict ====
Philip enjoyed his brother Henry VI's confidence to a very great extent, and appears to have been designated as guardian for the king's minor son, in the event of his early death. In September 1197 Philip had set out to fetch Frederick from Apulia for his coronation as King of the Romans in Aachen. While staying in Montefiascone, he heard of Henry VI's sudden death in Messina on 28 September 1197 and returned at once to Germany. He appears to have desired to protect the interests of his nephew and to quell the disorder which arose on Henry VI's death: On 21 January 1198, Philip issued a charter for the citizens of Speyer, in which he indicated that he was acting in the name of King Frederick; however, he was overtaken by events.

Meanwhile, a number of Princes of the Holy Roman Empire hostile to the ruling Hohenstaufen dynasty under the leadership of Prince-Archbishop Adolph of Cologne took the occasion to elect a German anti-king in the person of the Welf Otto of Brunswick, the second surviving son of the former Saxon duke Henry the Lion and a nephew of King Richard I of England. He was by no means Adolph's preferred candidate, because the Archdiocese of Cologne had benefited considerably from the fall of the powerful Duke Henry the Lion. Rather, a group of financially strong citizens ran Otto's election. In exchange for his support, the Archbishop was able to reduce the high debt burden of his diocese. The hostility to the kingship of a child was growing, so Philip was chosen by Ghibellines as defender of the empire during Frederick's minority, and Otto I of Burgundy, the only living elder brother of Philip who was passed over for being considered inefficient and busy solving problems in his own fief, also supported him. He finally consented to his own election at Nordhausen. On 6 March 1198, in front of the ecclesiastical and secular greats present in Ichtershausen, he declared his willingness to be elected king. Two days later (8 March) Philip was elected German King at Mühlhausen in Thuringia. The election took place on Laetare Sunday, a day that was of considerable symbolic importance in the Hohenstaufen royal tradition. Otherwise there were a number of symbolic deficits: Although backed in the election by Duke Leopold VI of Austria, Duke Ottokar I of Bohemia, Duke Berthold V of Zähringen, and Landgrave Hermann I of Thuringia, all the three Rhenish Archbishops (Cologne, Mainz and Trier), who traditionally performed an important ceremonial act of institution, were absent from Philip's election, and Mühlhausen was an unusual location for a king's election. For Mühlhausen, in the Hohenstaufen period up to Philip's election as king, only one single residence as a ruler can be proven. With this choice of location, Philip may have wanted to symbolically erase the humiliation that his great-uncle Conrad III suffered in autumn 1135 in Mühlhausen during his submission to Lothair III. Instead, the Imperial Regalia (crown, sword and orb) were in Philip's possession. His rival Otto was only elected on 9 June 1198 in Cologne by Archbishop Adolph (who had bought the votes of the absent archbishops). Only the Bishop of Paderborn, Bishop Thietmar of Minden, and three Prince-Provosts took part in the election of the Welf. After his election, Philip failed to make up for the coronation quickly. Rather, he moved to Worms next to his confidant, Bishop Luitpold. The hesitant behavior of Philip gave Otto the opportunity to be crowned by the rightful coronator ("Königskröner") Adolph of Cologne on 12 July 1198 at the traditional royal place in Aachen, which had to be captured before against the resistance of loyal Hohenstaufen liensmen.

In an empire without a written constitution, a solution had to be found under the conditions of a consensual system of rule where there were competing claims. These habits were agreed upon through consultation at court meetings, synods, or other gatherings. The consensus thus established was the most important process for establishing order in the Middle Ages. In the controversy for the German throne, one of the rivals was only able to prevail in the long term if the other side was offered noticeable compensation. It was necessary to create a compromise allowing the inferior opponent to abandon the kingship while preserving his honour.

In the first few months after his election as king, Philip failed to issue documents and thereby assert his kingship. His first surviving royal document, issued to Bishop Bertram of Metz, dated from Worms on 27 June 1198. Two days later, Philip forged an alliance with King Philip II of France. In Mainz Cathedral on 8 September 1198, it wasn't the Archbishop of Cologne, as usual, but Archbishop Aymon II of Tarentaise who crowned Philip as German King. It is uncertain whether his wife was also crowned alongside him. Despite these violations of the consuetudines (Customs) when he was elected and crowned as King, Philip was able to unite the majority of the princes behind him. For the princes, property, ancestry and origins were essential for their support of Philip. Nevertheless, he knew that he had to settle the conflict with Otto and his supporters. A first attempt to mediate by Archbishop Conrad of Mainz in 1199 was rejected by the Welf.

Both sides strived for the coronation as Holy Roman Emperor by Pope Innocent III and with it the recognition of their rule. The pontiff himself acted tactically before deciding on one of the conflicting parties; this gave them the opportunity to contact the Holy See several times through letters and embassies. Pope Innocent III wanted to prevent by all means the unio regni ad imperium (the reunification of the Holy Roman Empire and the Kingdom of Sicily, whose liege lord he was and wanted to remain) and he was also concerned about the Hohenstaufen claims to central Italy. For the pontiff, the question of obedience was a decisive factor in determining which candidate would have the papal recognition (favor apostolicus). In contrast to Otto, Philip expressed himself much more cautiously towards the Pope on this question.

In the first months of 1199, the Welf party asked for confirmation of the decision and for an invitation from the Pope for Otto IV to be crowned Holy Roman Emperor. On 28 May 1199, the supporters of the Hohenstaufen drew the Speyer Prince Declaration (Speyerer Fürstenerklärung), whereby they rejected any papal exertion of influence on the Imperial line of succession. At this point in time, Philip could have 4 archbishops, 23 imperial bishops, 4 imperial abbots and 18 secular imperial princes behind him; they confidently appealed to the princely majority and announced the march to Rome for the imperial coronation.

At the turn of the year 1200/01, the Pope subjected the candidates for the imperial coronation to a critical examination. In the Bull Deliberatio domni pape Innocentii super facto imperii de tribus electis, the Pope set out the reasons for and against the suitability of the respective candidates: Philip's nephew Frederick II was put aside due to his youth, and Philip himself was in the eyes of the Pope as "the son of a race of persecutors" of the church (genus persecutorum) because his father Frederick Barbarossa had fought against the Papacy for years. In contrast, Otto's ancestors were always loyal followers of the church. Otto had also sworn extensive concessions to the Holy See in the Neuss oath on 8 June 1201, assuring him that he would not strive for a union of the Holy Roman Empire with the Kingdom of Sicily. Thus, the Pope chose the Welf and excommunicated Philip and his associates. The papal judgment for Otto had no major effect in the empire.

==== Consolidation of rule ====
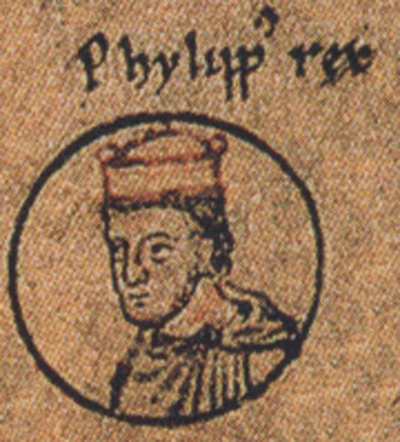
Philip of Swabia. Chronica Sancti Pantaleonis, Köln, Kloster St. Pantaleon, ca. 1237. Wolfenbüttel, Herzog August Library, Cod. Guelf. 74.3 Aug. 2°.

From then on, both kings tried to win over the undecided or opponents. In order to achieve this goal, there were fewer major decisive battles, but personal bonds between rulers and greats had to be strengthened. This happened because faithful, relatives and friends were favored by gifts or the transfer of imperial property, or by a marriage policy that was supposed to strengthen partisanship or promote a change of party. In an aristocratic society both rivals for the German throne this had regard for the rank and reputation of the great, on their honor take.

In the next few years of the controversy for the throne, the acts of representation of power were of immense importance, because in them not only the kingship was on display, but the role of the great in the respective system of rule was revealed. Philip did little to symbolically represent his kingship. In 1199, Philip and Irene-Maria celebrated Christmas with tremendous splendor (cum ingenti magnificentia) in Magdeburg —close to Otto's residence in Brunswick—in the presence of the Ascanian Duke Bernard of Saxony and numerous Saxon and Thuringian nobles. Contemporary sources had criticized the large expenditures on farm days as a waste, assuming a consistent modernization and more effective rulership; more recent studies, however, see the expenses of the court festival less as useless expenditure, but as a result of the goal of acquiring fame and honor. The Magdeburg Court Day at Christmas is considered to be the first high point in the fight for royal dignity. Some of the princes present expressed their first public support for the Hohenstaufen by participating. The chronicler of the Gesta of the Bishops of Halberstadt and the poet (Minnesänger) Walther von der Vogelweide were present. Walther's description of the great splendor of Magdeburg Court festivities in a series of poems and songs called "The Saying for Christmas in Magdeburg" (Spruch zur Magdeburger Weihnacht) in order to spread the reputation of Philip as a capable ruler. Philip's ability to rule as a king should be demonstrated by the rich clothing and the stately appearance of the participants in the festival. On Christmas Day the king went in a solemn procession with his splendidly dressed wife to the service under the crown. The Saxon Duke Bernard carried the king's sword in front of him and showed his support for the Hohenstaufen. The sword bearer service was not only an honorable distinction, as research has long assumed, but according to historian Gerd Althoff was also a sign of demonstrative subordination. In such event, personal ties were emphasized, because Bernard himself had intended in 1197 to fight for royal dignity. In addition, Bernard saw himself best protected against the possible expropriation of his Duchy of Saxony by the Welf through his support of the Hohenstaufen. The elevation of the bones of the Empress Cunigunde of Luxembourg, who was canonized by the Pope in 1200, was solemnly celebrated in Magdeburg Cathedral on 9 September 1201 in Philip's presence.

Also in 1201, Philip was visited by his cousin Boniface of Montferrat, the leader of the Fourth Crusade. Although Boniface's exact reasons for meeting with Philip are unknown, while at Philip's court he also met Alexius Angelus, Philip's brother-in-law. Some historians have suggested that it was here that Alexius convinced Boniface, and later the Venetians, to divert the Crusade to Constantinople and restore Isaac II to the throne, as he had recently been deposed by his brother Alexius III, Alexius and Irene-Maria's uncle.

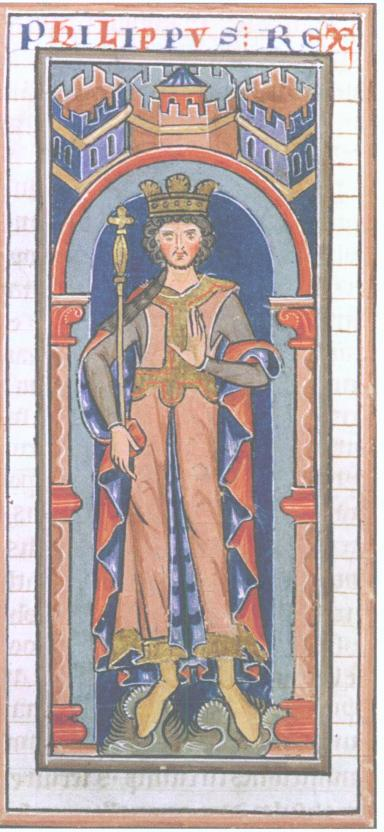
Philip of Swabia. Chronica regia Coloniensis (13th century), Brussels, Royal Library of Belgium, Ms. 467, fol. 138r.

In contrast to his father Frederick Barbarossa, marriage projects with foreign royal families were out of the question for Philip; his marriage policy was exclusively related to the dispute for the German throne. In 1203 he tried to find a balance with the Holy See through a marriage project, in which Philip wanted to arrange the betrothal of one of his daughters with a nephew of Pope Innocent III. However, Philip did not agree with important points required by the Pope, such as carrying out a crusade, returning unlawfully confiscated goods to the Roman Church or concession to canonical elections, which was why the marriage negotiations with the Pope failed.

In contrast to Otto, Philip was ready to honor the achievements of his loyal followers. The Hohenstaufen was able to attract high-ranking Welf supporters to his side through gifts and rewards. Rewarding the faithful was one of the most important duties of the ruler. Duke Ottokar I of Bohemia received the royal dignity in 1198 for his support. Philip rewarded Count Wilhelm II of Jülich with valuable gifts for his expressed will to win over all of Otto's important supporters for the Hohenstaufen. Otto, however, refused to give his brother Henry, the city of Braunschweig and Lichtenberg Castle in the spring of 1204. Henry then went over to the Hohenstaufen side. For his change of loyalty, not only was the County Palatine of the Rhine restored to him by Philip, but he was also enfeoffed with the Vogtei over Goslar and rewarded with monetary payments. The change of the Count Palatine was decisive for a broad movement away from the Welf.

During the siege of Weißensee on 17 September 1204, Landgrave Hermann of Thuringia humbly submitted to the Hohenstaufen. It is the only case of submission (deditio) through which the historical sources provide detailed information. According to chronicler Arnold of Lübeck, Philip held up to the Landgrave "while he was lying on the ground for so long" about his "disloyalty and stupidity". Only after the intercession of those present was he lifted from the floor and received the peace kiss from the King. Hermann had initially supported Otto, switched to Philip in 1199 and then again joined Otto in 1203/04. The Landgrave was able to retain his title and property after his submission and stayed in the Hohenstaufen side until Philip was murdered.

In November 1204 Archbishop Adolph of Cologne and Duke Henry I of Brabant also switched to Philip's side in Koblenz. The Duke of Brabant received Maastricht and Duisburg and the Archbishop of Cologne was able to retain his position in the election and ordination of a King and was rewarded with 5,000 marks for siding with Philip. The growing money traffic in the High Middle Ages influenced the princes in their decisions for military support or in the question of their partisanship. With the transfer of the Archbishop of Cologne to his side, Philip's documentary production also increased considerably. However, the majority of Cologne's citizens remained on the Welf's side. The support commitments of Archbishop Adolph and Henry I of Brabant were the first one documented since the Hohenstaufen-Zähringen agreement from 1152. The double election is therefore also seen as a turning point, as it marked the beginning of written alliances in the northern Alpine empire. The number of contracts concluded also rose during the controversy for the throne. However, these written agreements were regularly broken for political reasons. The nobles tried to use the political situation to expand their regional principalities. Landgrave Hermann of Thuringia, Philip's cousin, changed sides five times between the outbreak of the controversy and the election of Frederick II in September 1211. According to historian Stefan Weinfurter, the relativization of the oath by the Pope was also essential for the breach of contract. Pope Innocent III advised the spiritual and secular princes to submit to his judgment only. With the Duke of Brabant, Philip strengthens ties in 1207 with the betrothal of his daughter Maria with Henry, heir of the Duchy of Brabant. As a result, Henry I should be closely tied to the Hohenstaufen monarchy.

After the protracted conflicts between the Archbishop of Cologne and Philip, order had to be restored in a demonstrative way. Philip moved into Cologne on the symbolic Palm Sunday. The adventus (formally entry to a city) had "the function of a homage, a solemn recognition of the rule of the king". In addition, numerous Welf supporters on the Lower Rhine and from Westphalia had joined the Hohenstaufen side. Philip has now been able to unite a large number of supporters in the Holy Roman Empire behind him. The basis for Philip's success against Otto's followers was “a mixture of threats, promises and gifts”. On the occasion of the renewed coronation in Aachen, the Archbishop of Cologne went to meet Philip with “the greatest display of splendor and service” in front of the walls. In this way the Archbishop publicly recognized Philip as monarch. On 6 January 1205, Philip was crowned again with great ceremony at the traditional coronation site in Aachen by the correct coronator ("Königskröner"), the Archbishop of Cologne. With this measure Philip took the honor of the Archbishop into consideration and, by safeguarding his coronation right in Aachen, made submission to the long-fought king acceptable to him. The repetition of the coronation also cleared up the taint of his first coronation in 1198.

On 27 July 1206, Philip defeated a Cologne army loyal to Otto in Wassenberg. This was the only time that the armies of the two kings met. After the battle, the two kings met for the first time. It took place in an atmosphere of confidentiality (colloquium familiare) and offered the necessary consideration for the honor of the two kings. Direct negotiations in public were rather unusual at the time. However, the negotiations failed. Pope Innocent III also noticed Otto's decline in the empire and a month or two later Philip was loosed from the papal ban. In 1207/08 the Pope approached Philip and negotiations about the imperial coronation began, and also it seemed probable that a treaty was concluded by which were renewed the marriage negotiations of the nephew of the Pope with one of Philip's daughters and to receive the disputed territory of Tuscany.

=== Court ===
From the 12th century the court developed into a central institution of royal and princely rule. It was a “decision-making center and theater of power, consumer and entertainment center, distribution center, broker's seat for and for power, money and goods and social opportunities, for tastes, ideas and fashions of all kinds”. Medieval kingship was exercised in an empire without a capital through outpatient rulership practice. Philip had to go through the kingdom and thereby give his rule validity and authority. The greats of the empire gathered for deliberations on the court days. For Philip's reign, 28 Hoftag are known, of which only 12 took place within the Hohenstaufen sphere of influence. Somewhat more than 630 people can be found at Philip's court between 1198 and 1208, of whom around 100 belonged to the King's inner court, being "attested in a somewhat more noticeable density in the Hohenstaufen circle". The Bishops Konrad of Hildesheim, Hartwig of Eichstätt and Konrad IV of Regensburg and especially Konrad of Speyer joined to Philip's court. By contrast, none of the secular princes is as closely and frequently attested to at court as Bishop Konrad of Speyer. Duke Bernhard of Saxony, Duke Louis I of Bavaria and Margrave Theodoric I of Meissen probably had the most intensive contact within the court. They had profited significantly from the fall of Henry the Lion and feared that his son Otto IV would gain access to the Welf inheritance. The ministeriales had in Henry of Kalden their most outstanding representant: he was not only a military leader, but also influenced Philip's politics by arranging a personal encounter with Otto. He is mentioned in more than 30 charters and also in narrative sources.

The most important part of the court was the Chancery. Philip's Chancery was in the personal tradition of Henry VI. In other ways, too, Philip's document system does not differ from that of his Hohenstaufen predecessors. In contrast to his predecessors, his rival Otto IV and his nephew Frederick II, Philip had few seals. The ducal seals for Tuscany and Swabia as well as a wax seal and a gold bull for the royal period are verifiable. This is probably due to the fact that he did not obtain the imperial crown, because it would have led to a change in title. With his awarding of charters, Philip reached considerably further north, north-west (Bremen, Utrecht, Zutphen) and south-west (Savoy, Valence) to assert his kingship. With the issuing of charters, Philip wanted to bind his followers more closely to himself in these areas as well. His itinerarium is shaped like no other ruling rulers from the Hohenstaufen era by the political situation of the controversy for the throne. An almost orderly move through the empire with continuous notarial activity did not take place. Rather, a regionalization of itinerary, awarding of charters and visits to the court can be identified, which historian Bernd Schütte interpreted as a “withdrawal of the royal central authority”.

Philip is considered to be the "first Roman-German ruler whose court can be shown to have courtly poetry and who himself became the subject of courtly poetry." Walther von der Vogelweide dedicated a special song to the Magdeburg Court Day of 1199, in which he honored Philip as ruler. During his short reign, Philip didn't have the opportunity to promote art or build buildings. Spiritual institutions were not particularly promoted by him.

== Death ==
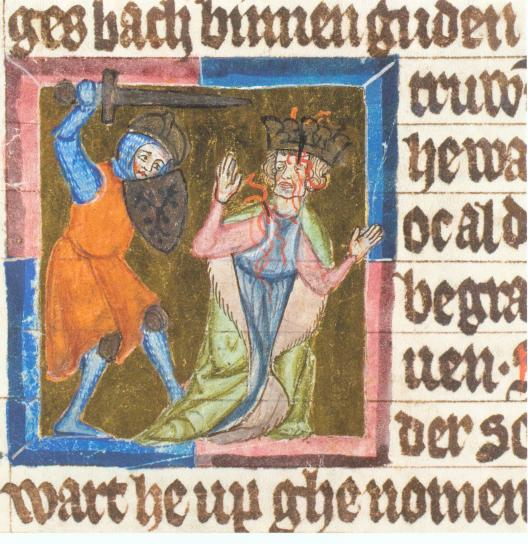
Count Palatine Otto VIII of Wittelsbach kills Philip of Swabia. Miniature from the Sächsische Weltchronik, Northern Germany, early 14th century, Berlin, Berlin State Library, Ms. germ. fol. 129, fol. 117v.

Since the end of May 1208, Philip had been preparing for a campaign against Otto IV and his allies. He interrupted the planning to attend the wedding of his niece Countess Beatrice II of Burgundy with Duke Otto of Merania on 21 June in Bamberg. After the marriage, the King retired to his private apartments. In the afternoon he was murdered by Count Otto VIII of Wittelsbach. After the murder, Count Otto VIII was able to flee with his followers. Bishop Ekbert of Bamberg and his brother, Margrave Henry II of Istria, were suspected of having known about the plans. Other medieval historians expressed doubts about complicity or ignored other possible perpetrators.

For the first time since the end of the Merovingian dynasty a king had been murdered. Besides Albert I of Habsburg (1308), Philip is the only Roman-German ruler to be assassinated. No chronicler witnessed the murder. In contemporary sources there is little agreement about the course of the murder. Most medieval chroniclers saw the withdrawal of the promise of marriage as a motive for murder. Even in distant Piacenza, Philip's murder was still associated with a failed marriage project. Allegedly the Wittelsbach scion, already known for his unstable character, had fallen into a rage when he learned of the dissolution of his betrothal to Gertrude of Silesia by her father, the Piast Duke Henry I the Bearded, who was apparently informed of Count Otto VIII's cruel tendencies and in an act of concern for his young daughter decided to terminate the marriage agreement. Later, after an unfortunate campaign to Thuringia, Philip had betrothed his third daughter Kunigunde to Count Otto VIII in the summer of 1203 in order to make him a reliable ally in the fight against Landgrave Hermann I of Thuringia. In the following years Philip increasingly succeeded in gaining acceptance for his kingship, so the betrothal with the Wittelsbach became without purpose to him; in November 1207 the King engaged Kunigunde to Wenceslaus, son and heir of King Ottokar I of Bohemia, on the Hoftag in Augsburg. Philip hoped that this alliance would gain permanent support from Bohemia. For Count Otto VIII this behavior was an act of treason and also felt that his social status was threatened; he swore revenge on the German King, whom he blamed for both spurned betrothals, culminating in the murder at Bamberg.

Since historian Eduard Winkelmann's analysis in the 19th century, research has assumed that Otto VIII of Wittelsbach acted as a lone perpetrator. In contrast, historian Bernd Ulrich Hucker hypothesized a “comprehensive conspiratorial plan” in 1998 and suspected a “coup d'état”. The Andechs Dukes of Merania, King Philip II of France and Duke Henry I of Brabant should have been involved in this comprehensive plot; allegedly, the conspirators had planned to put the Duke of Brabant on the German throne. But Hucker's coup hypothesis did not prevail. It remains to be seen what use the French king would have had from the removal of Philip and his replacement by the Duke of Brabant. The House of Andechs, as loyal followers of Philip, who often stayed at his court and were protected by him, had no interest in his death.

== Aftermath ==
Philip was initially buried in Bamberg Cathedral, the burial place of Emperor Henry II and King Conrad III. His rival Otto IV let the assassins be persecuted relentlessly and wanted to prove his innocence. Only the Annales Pegaviensis (chronicle of the Pegau Abbey) held Otto IV's supporters responsible for the murder. Philip's widow, Irene-Maria, pregnant at that time, took refuge in Hohenstaufen Castle, dying only two months after the Bamberg regicide as a result of a miscarriage. After Philip's death, Otto IV quickly prevailed against the remaining Hohenstaufen supporters, was acknowledged as German monarch at an Imperial Diet in Frankfurt in November 1208 and crowned Holy Roman Emperor by Pope Innocent III the next year. For the new fully recognized German King, the most important goal was to restore order in the realm. A Landfrieden was established for this purpose and the Imperial ban on Philip's murderer and alleged accomplices, the Andechs brothers Bishop Ekbert of Bamberg and Margrave Henry II of Istria, was imposed. As a result, they lost all offices, rights and property. In addition, Otto IV's engagement to Beatrix, Philip's eldest daughter, was agreed. Philip's murderer Otto VIII of Wittelsbach (now condemned as vogelfrei) was found in March 1209 by Reichsmarschall Henry of Kalden in a granary on the Danube near Regensburg and beheaded. The Andechs brothers, however, were politically rehabilitated three years later.

However, Otto IV soon entered into conflict with Pope Innocent III when he tried to conquer the Kingdom of Sicily in 1210, which led to his excommunication. The Welf lost the consensus on his rule in the part of the empire north of the Alps, and part of the princes renounced to their vow of obedience to Otto IV and chose Philip's nephew Frederick II as a rival emperor (alium imperatorem). In 1212 Frederick II moved to the northern part of the empire. At the turn of the year 1213/14, Frederick II's rule in the empire north of the Alps was not yet secured. In this situation, Frederick II had Philip's remains transferred from Bamberg to Speyer. Personally, Frederick II does not seem to have come to Bamberg for the transfer of the body. Bamberg was possibly avoided by the later Hohenstaufen rulers because of Philip's murder. At Christmas 1213 Philip's mortal remains were re-interred in Speyer Cathedral, which was considered a memorial of the Salian-Staufen dynasty and was the most important burial place of the Roman-German kingship. By transferring there his uncle Philip's remains, Frederick II was able to gain the trust of the Hohenstaufen partisans and strengthened his position against his opponents. From the mid-13th century, the death anniversary of Philip was celebrated in Speyer in a way similar to that of the Salian Emperor Henry IV. Philip is the last Roman-German king who is listed in both medieval dead books of the Speyer Cathedral. The Bamberg Horseman, a figure carved in stone on Bamberg Cathedral around 1235, has repeatedly been referred to as Philip; so historian Hans Martin Schaller sees in him the attempt to maintain Philip's memory. But the figure was also mistaken for either the Roman Emperor Constantine the Great, King Saint Stephen I of Hungary, or Emperors Henry II and Frederick II.

=== Medieval judgements ===
Many chroniclers saw the divine order represented by the ruler as a result of the conflict between the two kings for the throne. Philip is described in detail in the chronicle of the premonstratensian priest Burchard of Ursperg. Burchard wrote a continuation of the World Chronicle (Chronicon universale) of Ekkehard of Aura and Frutolf of Michelsberg in 1229/30. The chronicle is one of the most important sources for the history of the empire at the beginning of the 13th century. For the chronicler (who was loyal to the Hohenstaufen), Philip was of a meek and mild disposition, of affable speech, kind and quite generous, while Otto IV was not named with the title of king until Philip was murdered. Despite great physical strength, the Welf lacked all the important virtues of rulership; for Burchard, he was “haughty and stupid, but brave and tall” (superbus et stultus, sed fortis videbatur viribus et statura procerus). The chronicler Arnold of Lübeck, despite being loyal to the Welf dynasty, called Philip an "ornament of virtues". Arnold portrayed Otto IV's rule through the murder of Philip as being cursed by God. The image of Philip in posterity had a major impact on Walther von der Vogelweide, who referred to him in an honorable short form as "young and brave man".

The Bamberg regicide had no major impact on the further history of the empire. Later chroniclers and annals describe the transition of the royal rule from Philip to Otto IV as smooth. However, after the experience of the dynastic dispute over in the empire, a considerable development spurt began, which led to a rethink in writing down the customs. The Sachsenspiegel of Eike of Repgow is an important testimony to this.

=== Artistic reception ===
In modern times, little was remembered of Philip of Swabia. He fell significantly behind the other Hohenstaufen rulers Frederick Barbarossa and Frederick II. His reign, which was limited to a few years, was never undisputed, and he was never crowned Holy Roman Emperor. In addition, he hadn't fought a major conflict with the Pope, in which the alleged failure of the medieval central authority could have been exemplified. In addition, his name cannot be associated with any extraordinary conception of power. Furthermore, his murder could not be instrumentalized for sectarian disputes or for the establishment of a German nation-state in the 19th century.

Representations of the Bamberg regicide are rarely found in history painting. Alexander Zick made a drawing of the murder in 1890, and Karl Friedrich Lessing made a draft without converting it into a painting. On 4 July 1998, Rainer Lewandowski's play “The King's Murder in Bamberg” was premiered at the E.T.A.-Hoffmann-Theater in Bamberg.

=== Historical research ===
Historical research of the 19th and early 20th century was hampered by historians anachronistically projecting their contemporary political preferences backwards in time. During the contemporary Kulturkampf, nationalist Protestant historians viewed the Catholic church or anything that smacked of ultramontanism extremely negatively. Likewise Kleinstaaterei was seen as a historical calamity and there was a search for culpable parties in history. The historians of the 19th century were interested in a strong monarchical central power and therefore looked for the reasons for the late emergence of a unified German nation state.

The "sources of strength of the German nation" were located in the Middle Ages. The kings and emperors were presented as early representatives of a strong monarchical power that was also longed for by the nationalist historians for their own time. The decisive factor for the historians' judgment was whether the medieval rulers increased the royal development of power over the nobility and the church or whether they were seen to be responsible for the loss of power.

The image of history shaped by this perspective emerged after the 1806 dissolution of the HRE and the Wars of Liberation against Napoleon. It was heavily colored by romantic nationalism. From that point of view, the German kings and emperors under the Ottonian, Salian and Hohenstaufen dynasties appeared to be extremely powerful, since they held a predominant position in Europe. In the course of the Middle Ages, however, the emperors had lost this position of power.

In the perspective of Protestant nationalist German historiography, the papacy and the princes were held responsible for this. They were considered to be the "gravedigger of German royal power.” Two turning points were considered to be decisive for the central authority's loss of power. The first one was the Road to Canossa by Henry IV in 1077 (in which he lost royal influence over the church). The second one was the double election of 1198. The nobility used their right to vote for kings to obtain privileges from the monarchy and thus expand their own rule. The view of a loss of power for the German kingship through the double election of 1198 has long remained the predominant one. In Karl Bosl's work “Die Reichsministerialität” from 1950, Philip and Otto IV's government signified “a huge, if not perhaps the decisive, setback that the German monarchy suffered in its last attempt to build a state”.

The historical study of Philip of Swabia began in 1852 with the monograph König Philipp der Hohenstaufe by Heinrich Friedrich Otto Abel, who made no secret of his sympathies for Philip. Eduard Winkelmann's Yearbooks of German History (Jahrbücher der Deutschen Geschichte) under Philip of Swabia and Otto IV (1878) became the standard reference work of later historiography. With 541 closely described pages, they are the most detailed account of the Hohenstaufen to date. Winkelmann wrote about Philip that he was "attractive as a person, as a king to be counted among the best and most capable”. In 1866 Wilhelm Grotefend published his dissertation. Unlike Winkelmann and Abel, he passed a damning verdict on Philip. He regarded Philip as a "dependent, weak personality with a smooth form and graceful appearance, but without nobility of disposition." The decisive factor for this judgment was that Philip didn't fight energetically enough for his kingship, and that his alliance with the French king granted "the Erbfeind" influence over the Holy Roman Empire. In addition, he had made too many concessions to an arrogant Pope and selfish princes.

Since the 1980s, historical research on the Middle Ages has gained numerous new insights into high medieval royalty. The German royal rule in the Middle Ages was no longer perceived as a history of decline. Rather, the king and the nobility are seen as "natural main partners in the empire". The older image of the selfish princes who only wanted to weaken the kingship was put into perspective by pointing out that the nobility repeatedly tried to settle the throne dispute. The newer research shifted the focus to the communication and interaction of the ruler with his great ones. Philip's actions were no longer questioned regarding the increase in monarchical power, but rather regarding the means by which he tried to enforce his kingship in the aristocratic network of relationships.

In contrast to other Staufers, Philip remained a neglected ruler for a long time in medieval studies. For several decades no major accounts of Philip appeared. His murder in Bamberg didn't attract the interest of even the Historical Association of Bamberg (Historischer Verein Bamberg) in 1908 or 1958. Only recently has Philip received greater attention in historical studies. In 1998, historian Bernd Ulrich Hucker characterized Philip as a "weak king" who was completely dependent on his ministeriales, whereby the imperial princes lost their influence on the king. Ulrich no longer saw the regicide of Bamberg as a private vengeance, but as a “coup d'état” by important imperial elites. This hypothesis sparked controversial discussions, but did not prevail.

Since 2002 the edition of the diplomas of Philip of Swabia has been prepared on behalf of the Monumenta Germaniae Historica. The edition published in 2014 has a total of 216 documents and deperdita (lost documents that have been handed down in other sources, for example chronicles), including 199 documents from Philip's ten-year reign as king, of which around 2/3 are products of his court. Bernd Schütte's work, published in 2002, examined the scope of action and the ability to integrate Philip's monarchy on the basis of itinerary, award of certificates and court. Schütte contradicted Hucker's thesis of the weak kingship of Philip of Swabia. He interpreted the increase in document production, from an average of 1.5 pieces per month to just over two pieces (due to the transfer of Archbishop Adolph of Cologne in November 1204) as a "yardstick for the recognition of his kingship". Schütte also found that Philip's radius of action had extended beyond the rooms of personal presence through the award of diplomas.

In 2003, Peter Csendes published the first modern biography of Philip of Swabia in 130 years. On the 800th anniversary of the murder of Philip in 2008, the Society for Staufer History (Gesellschaft für staufische Geschichte) dedicated a volume to Philip. In the working group for regional and local history in the Association of Württemberg History and Antiquity Associations (Arbeitskreis für Landes- und Ortsgeschichte im Verband der württembergischen Geschichts- und Altertumsvereine), the spring meeting on 25 April 2008 was entitled "Philipp von Schwaben († 1208) and the rule in the German southwest". His rule was viewed from a regional historical perspective. A conference also took place in Vienna in May 2008, the contributions of which were published in 2010. Based on the edition of the documents for Philip's reign, the studies reveal new possibilities for knowledge.

== Sources ==
- Abulafia, David (1988). Frederick II: A Medieval Emperor. Oxford University Press.
- Alemparte, Jaime Ferreiro (1986). "Acercamiento Mutuo de Espana y Alemania" [Spain and Germany Mutual Approach]. In Martín, Antonio Pérez (ed.). España y Europa, un pasado jurídico común [Spain and Europe, a common legal past] (in Spanish). Cometa S.A.
- Althoff, Gerd (1997). "Namengebung und adliges Selbstverständnis" [Naming and noble self-understanding]. In Geuenich, Dieter; Haubrichs, Wolfgang; Jarnut, Jörg (eds.). Nomen et gens: Zur historischen Aussagekraft frühmittelalterlicher Personennamen [Nomen et gens: On the historical significance of early medieval personal names] (in German). Berlin: De Gruyter. pp. 126–139. ISBN 9783110158090.
- —— (2009). "Otto IV. – Woran scheiterte der welfische Traum vom Kaisertum?" [Otto IV – How did the Welfish dream of the imperiality fail?]. Frühmittelalterliche Studien (in German). 43: 199–214.
- —— (2012). "Die Kathedrale als Begegnungsort von Religion und Politik: Das Beispiel des Magdeburger Domes" [The cathedral as a meeting place of religion and politics: The example of the Magdeburg Cathedral]. In Schenkluhn, Wolfgang; Waschbüsch, Andreas (eds.). Der Magdeburger Dom im europäischen Kontext [Magdeburg Cathedral in European context] (in German). Regensburg: Schnell & Steiner. pp. 13–23. ISBN 978-3795424510.
- Baldwin, Philip B. (2014). Pope Gregory X and the Crusades. The Boydell Press. ISBN 9781843839163.
- Bihrer, Andreas (2005). "Philipp von Schwaben (1208)". In Sommer, Michael (ed.). Politische Morde: Vom Altertum bis zur Gegenwart [Political murders: From Antiquity to the Present] (in German). Darmstadt: Wissenschaftliche Buchgesellschaft. pp. 117–126. ISBN 978-3534185184.
- Bihrer, Andreas (2010). "Historiker als Attentäter: Zeitgenössische Wahrnehmung, narrative Ausgestaltung und diskursive Instrumentalisierung der Ermordung König Philipps von Schwaben" [Historians as assassins: Contemporary perception, narrative design and discursive instrumentalization of the assassination of King Philip of Swabia]. In Rzihacek, Andrea; et al. (eds.). Philipp von Schwaben: Beiträge der internationalen Tagung anlässlich seines 800. Todestages, Wien, 29. bis 30. Mai 2008 (in German). Vienna: Austrian Academy of Sciences. pp. 9–24. ISBN 978-3700166511.
- Ciggaar, Krijna Nelly (1996). Western Travellers to Constantinople: The West and Byzantium, 962–1204. Brill. ISBN 978-90-04-47805-3.
- Csendes, Peter (2003). Philipp von Schwaben: Ein Staufer im Kampf um die Macht [Philip of Swabia: A Staufer in the fight for power] (in German). Darmstadt: Primus Verlag. ISBN 9783896784582.
- Csendes, Peter (2010). "Aspekte der Biographie Philipps von Schwaben" [Aspects of the biography of Philip of Swabia]. In Rzihacek, Andrea; et al. (eds.). Philipp von Schwaben (in German). Vienna: Austrian Academy of Sciences. pp. 73–84. ISBN 978-3700166511.
- Görich, Knut (2006). Die Staufer: Herrscher und Reich [The Staufer: Ruler and Empire] (in German). Munich: C.H.Beck. ISBN 978-3406535932.
- Görich, Knut (2010). "Ehre als Handlungsmotiv in Herrschaftspraxis und Urkunden Philipps von Schwaben" [Honor as a motive for action in the practice of domination and documents of Philip of Swabia]. In Rzihacek, Andrea; et al. (eds.). Philipp von Schwaben (in German). Vienna: Austrian Academy of Sciences. pp. 129–150. ISBN 978-3700166511.
- Görich, Knut (2011). Friedrich Barbarossa: eine Biographie [Friedrich Barbarossa: a biography] (in German). München: C.H. Beck. ISBN 978-3-406-59823-4.
- Hucker, Bernd Ulrich (1998). "Der Königsmord von 1208 – Privatrache oder Staatsstreich?" [The King’s Murder of 1208 – Private Throat or Coup?]. In Henning, Lothar (ed.). Die Andechs-Meranier in Franken: Europäisches Fürstentum im Mittelalter [The Andechs-Meranier in Franconia: European Principality in the Middle Ages] (in German). Mainz: Verlag Phillip von Zabern in Wissenschaftliche Buchgesellschaft. ISBN 3805324871.
- Keupp, Jan (2008). "Der Bamberger Mord 1208 – ein Königsdrama?" [The Bamberg Murder 1208 – a Royal Drama?]. Philipp von Schwaben – Ein Staufer im Kampf um die Königsherrschaft [Philip of Swabia – A Staufer in the Battle for the Rule of the King] (in German). pp. 122–142. ISBN 9783929776195.
- Krieb, Steffen (2000). Vermitteln und Versöhnen. Konfliktregelung im deutschen Thronstreit 1198–1208 [Mediate and reconcile. Conflict settlement in the German throne dispute 1198–1208] (in German). Köln: Böhlau. ISBN 9783412111991.
- Krieb, Steffen (2010). "Verfahren der Konfliktlösung in Thronstreitigkeiten. Deutschland, Dänemark und Ungarn im Vergleich" [Conflict resolution procedures in throne disputes. Germany, Denmark and Hungary: Useful Info]. In Rzihacek, Andrea; et al. (eds.). Philipp von Schwaben (in German). Vienna: Austrian Academy of Sciences. pp. 277–292. ISBN 978-3700166511.
- Kottmann, Katrin (2005). "Die Thronstreitpolitik Adolfs I. von Altena im Spannungsfeld von 'Recht' und Rechtsmentalität" [The power of the throne disputes of Adolf I of Altena in the field of tension between 'law' and legal mentality]. Frühmittelalterliche Studien (in German). 39: 151–175.
- Kroonen, Guus; Langbroek, Erika; Quak, Arend; Roeleveld, Annelies, eds. (2014). Amsterdamer Beiträge zur älteren Germanistik. Vol. 72. Editions Rodopi.
- Lyon, Jonathan R. (2013). Princely Brothers and Sisters: The Sibling Bond in German Politics, 1100–1250. Ithaca: Cornell University Press. ISBN 9780801451300.
- Madden, Thomas F. (2014) [First published 1999]. The Concise History of the Crusades. New York: Rowman & Littlefield. ISBN 978-1442215740.
- Maiorov, Alexander V. (2021). "The German King Philip of Swabia, Hungarian Queen Gertrude of Andechs-Meranien, and St Elizabeth of Thuringia in Rus' Chronicles". Jahrbücher für Geschichte Osteuropas. 69 (2): 253–292. doi:10.25162/jgo-2021-0007.
- Rzihacek, Andrea (2010). "Die Edition der Urkunden Philipps von Schwaben für die Diplomata-Reihe der Monumenta Germania Historica. Planung – Durchführung – Aspekte" [The edition of the documents of Philip of Swabia for the Diplomata series of the Monumenta Germania Historica. Planning – implementation – aspects]. In Rzihacek, Andrea; et al. (eds.). Philipp von Schwaben (in German). Vienna: Austrian Academy of Sciences. pp. 151–161. ISBN 978-3700166511.
- Scheibelreiter, Georg (2010). "Philipp von Schwaben in höfischer Sicht" [Philip of Swabia in courtly view]. In Rzihacek, Andrea; et al. (eds.). Philipp von Schwaben (in German). Vienna: Austrian Academy of Sciences. pp. 85–98. ISBN 978-3700166511.
- Schieffer, Rudolf (2010). "Zur Eröffnung: Philipp von Schwaben im 19. und 20. Jahrhundert" [For the opening: Philip of Swabia in 19th and 20th century]. In Rzihacek, Andrea; et al. (eds.). Philipp von Schwaben (in German). Vienna: Austrian Academy of Sciences. pp. 1–6. ISBN 978-3700166511.
- Schneidmüller, Bernd; Weinfurter, Stefan (2003). Die deutschen Herrscher des Mittelalters: historische Portraits von Heinrich I. bis Maximilian I. (919–1519) [The German rulers of the Middle Ages: historical portraits from Henry I to Maximilian I. (919–1519)] (in German). C.H. Beck. ISBN 978-3-406-50958-2.
- Schütte, Bernd (2002). König Philipp von Schwaben. Itinerar – Urkundenvergabe – Hof [King Philip of Swabia. Itinerar – Award of documents – Court] (in German). Hanover: Hahnsche Buchhandlung. ISBN 3-7752-5751-9.
- Schütte, Bernd (2008). "Der Hof König Philipps von Schwaben" [The court of King Philip of Swabia]. Philipp von Schwaben – Ein Staufer im Kampf um die Königsherrschaft [Philip of Swabia – A Staufer in the Battle for the Rule of the King] (in German). Göppingen. pp. 43–61. ISBN 9783929776195.
- Seibert, Hubertus (2005). "Die frühen Staufer – Forschungsbilanz und offene Fragen" [The early Staufer – research balance and open questions]. In Seibert, Hubertus; Dendorfer, Jürgen (eds.). Grafen, Herzöge, Könige. Der Aufstieg der Staufer und das Reich 1079–1152 [Counts, Dukes, kings. The Rise of the Staufer and the Kingdom 1079–1152] (in German). Ostfildern: Thorbecke. pp. 1–39. doi:10.11588/diglit.34732. ISBN 978-3-7995-4269-2.
- Stürner, Wolfgang (1992). Friedrich II: Teil 1 Die Konigscheffschaft in Sizilien un Deutschland 1194–1220 [Frederick II: Part 1 The Conigship in Sicily and Germany 1194–1220] (in German). Darmstadt: Wissenschaftliche Buchgesellschaft.
- Stürner, Wolfgang (2007). 13. Jahrhundert. 1198–1273. Handbuch der deutschen Geschichte 6 (in German) (10th, completely revised ed.). Stuttgart: Klett-Cotta. ISBN 978-3608600063.
- Weinfurter, Stefan (2008). "Verträge und politisches Handeln um 1200". Philipp von Schwaben – Ein Staufer im Kampf um die Königsherrschaft [Philip of Swabia – A Staufer in the Battle for the Rule of the King] (in German). Göppingen. pp. 26–42. ISBN 9783929776195.
- Weller, Tobias. "Dynastische Politik unter Philipp von Schwaben" [Dynastic politics under Philip of Swabia]. In Rzihacek, Andrea; et al. (eds.). Philipp von Schwaben (in German). Vienna: Austrian Academy of Sciences. pp. 193–214. ISBN 978-3700166511.
- Wihoda, Martin (2015). Vladislaus Henry: The Formation of Moravian Identity. Brill. ISBN 978-90-04-30383-6.
- Winkelmann, Eduard August (1873). Philipp von Schwaben und Otto IV. von Braunschweig (in German). Duncker & Humblot.
- Zientara, Benedykt (1997). Henryk Brodaty i jego czasy [Henry the Bearded and His Time] (in Polish). Wydawnictwo TRIO.

Philip of Swabia House of Hohenstaufen Born: 1177 Died: 1208
Regnal titles
Preceded by Henry VI	King of Germany; 1198–1208 (contested by Otto IV)	Succeeded by Otto IV
Preceded by Conrad II	Duke of Swabia; 1196–1208	Succeeded by Frederick VI
Preceded by Christian I	Margrave of Tuscany; 1195–1197	Succeeded by none
Preceded by Gottfried of Spitzenberg	Prince-Bishop of Würzburg; 1190–1191	Succeeded by Heinrich of Berg
