= List of countesses of the Palatinate =

The Countess of the Palatinate (German: Gräfin von der Pfalz) was the consort of the Count of the Palatinate, one of the Empire's greatest princes.

== Non-Hereditary, 1085–1156 ==
Picture	Name	Father	Birth	Marriage	Became Countess	Ceased to be Countess	Death	Husband
	Adelheid von Weimar-Orlamünde	Otto I, Margrave of Meissen (Meissen)	around 1055	after 1080	1085 husband's accession	23 October 1095 husband's death	28 March 1100	Henry of Laach
	Gertrude of Northeim	Henry, Margrave of Frisia (Northeim)	1090	before 27 August 1111		3 September 1113 husband's death	before 1165	Siegfried of Ballenstedt
	Liutgard of Zähringen	Berthold II, Duke of Zähringen (Zähringen)	-	-	1113 husband's death	1129 husband's deposition	-	Gottfried von Calw
	Adelheid	-	-	before 17 March 1130	1129 husband's accession	1139 husband's deposition	-	Wilhelm von Ballenstedt
	Gertrude of Hohenstaufen	Frederick I, Duke of Swabia (Hohenstaufen)	-	1127	1142 husband's accession	2 October 1156 husband's death	after 1182	Hermann von Stahleck

== House of Hohenstaufen, 1156–1195 ==
Picture	Name	Father	Birth	Marriage	Became Countess	Ceased to be Countess	Death	Husband
	?	Gottfried I, Count of Sponheim (Sponheim)	-	-	1156 husband's appointment	1159/60		Conrad
	Irmingard of Henneberg	Berthold I, Count of Henneberg (Henneberg)	-	1159		c. 1212 husband's abdication	15 July 1197	Conrad

== House of Welf, 1195–1214 ==
Picture	Name	Father	Birth	Marriage	Became Countess	Ceased to be Countess	Death	Husband
	Agnes of Hohenstaufen	Conrad, Count Palatine of the Rhine (Hohenstaufen)	1176	December 1193 or January 1194	8 November 1195 husband's accession	9/10 May 1204		Henry V
	Agnes of Wettin	Conrad II, Margrave of Lower Lusatia (Wettin)	-	1211		c. 1212 husband's abdication	1 January 1248	Henry V
	Matilda of Brabant	Henry I, Duke of Brabant (Leuven)	1200	end-November 1212	c. 1212 husband's accession	25 April 1214 husband's death	22 December 1267	Henry VI

== House of Wittelsbach, 1214–1356 ==
Picture	Name	Father	Birth	Marriage	Became Countess	Ceased to be Countess	Death	Husband
	Ludmilla of Bohemia	Frederick, Duke of Bohemia (Přemyslid)	1170	end-October 1204	25 April 1214 husband's accession	15 September 1231 husband's death	5 August 1240	Louis I
	Agnes of the Palatinate	Henry V, Count Palatine of the Rhine (Welf)	1201	May 1222	15 September 1231 husband's accession	29 November 1253 husband's death	16 November 1267	Otto II Wittelsbach
	Maria of Brabant	Henry II, Duke of Brabant (Leuven)	1226	2 August 1254		18 January 1256		Louis II
	Anna of Glogau	Konrad I, Duke of Silesia-Glogau (Piast)	1250/52	24 August 1260		25 June 1271		Louis II
	Matilda of Habsburg	Rudolph I of Germany (Habsburg)	1252	24 October 1273		2 February 1294 husband's death	23 December 1304	Louis II
	Mechtild of Nassau	Adolf, King of the Romans (Nassau)	before 1280	1 September 1294		1317 husband's desposition	19 June 1323	Rudolf I
	Beatrix of Świdnica	Bolko I, Duke of Jawor and Świdnica (Piast)	1290/2	14 October 1308/11	1317 husband's accession	25 August 1322		Emperor Louis IV
	Margaret of Holland	William I, Count of Hainaut (Avesnes)	1311	26 February 1324		1329; Treaty of Pavia	23 June 1356	Emperor Louis IV
	Anna of Gorizia-Tyrol	Otto III, Duke of Carinthia (Meinhardiner)	1300	1328	1329; Treaty of Pavia	16 May 1331 or 4 July 1335		Rudolf II
	Margaret of Sicily	Frederick III of Sicily (Barcelona)	1331	1348		4 October 1353 husband's death	1377	Rudolf II
	Elisabeth of Namur	John I, Marquis of Namur (Dampierre)	1329	Autumn 1350 or Summer 1358		10 January 1356; Raised to Electress	29 March 1382	Rupert I
