= Stahleck Castle =

12th-century fortified castle in Bacharach, Germany

Coordinates: 50°03′29″N 7°45′56″E

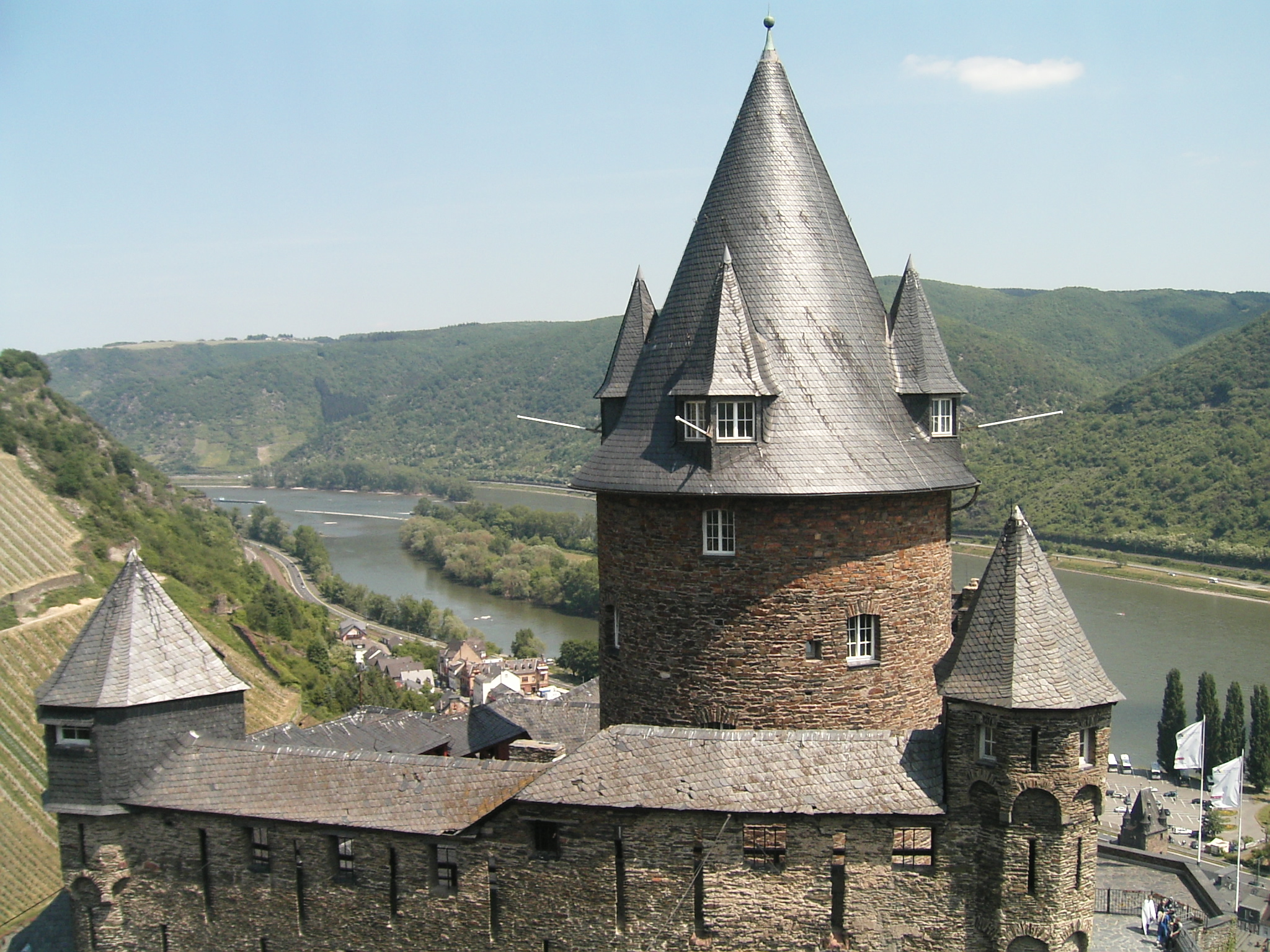
View over Stahleck Castle to the Rhine

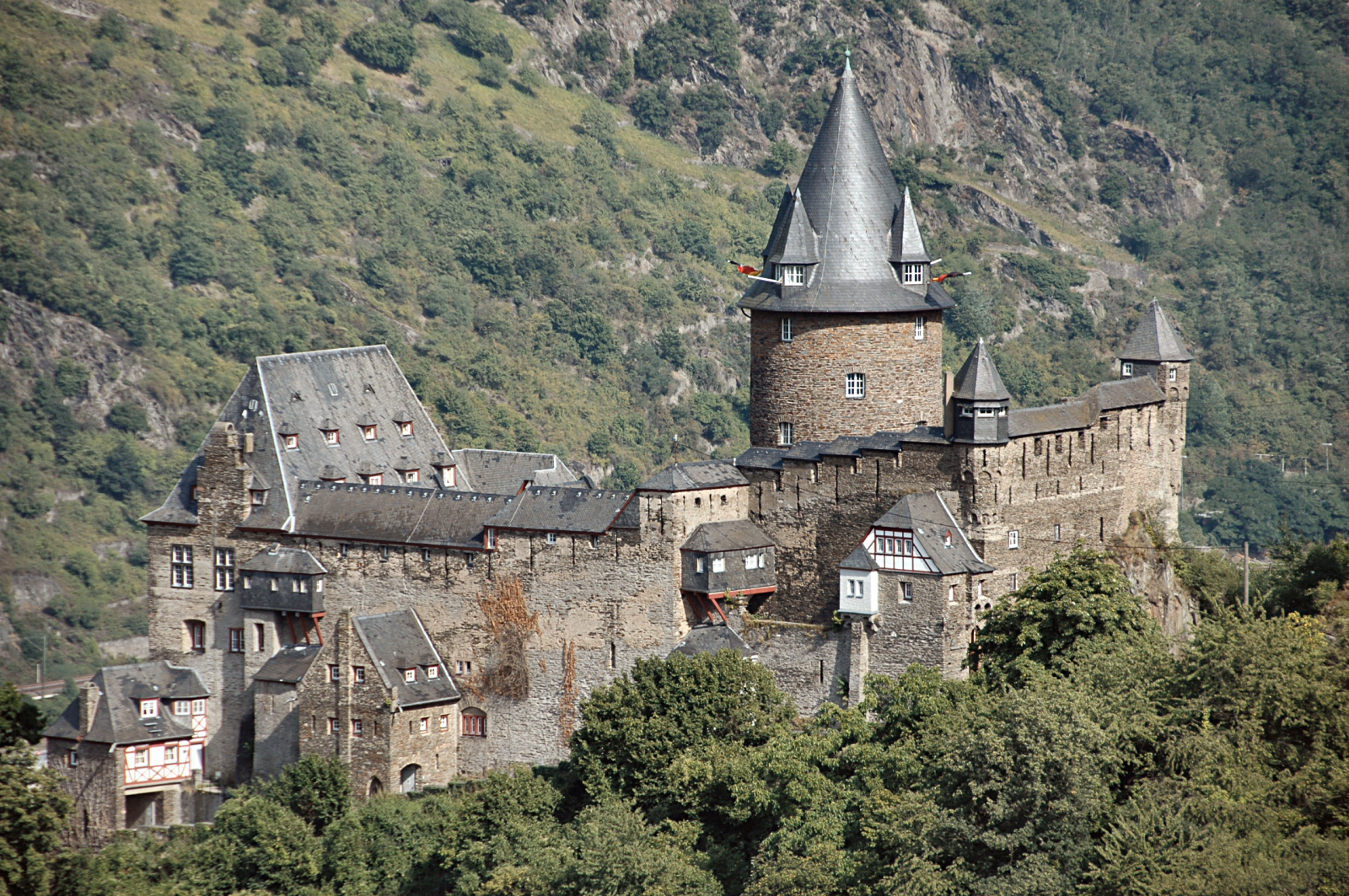
The castle from the northwest

Stahleck Castle (German: Burg Stahleck) is a 12th-century fortified castle in the Upper Middle Rhine Valley at Bacharach in Rhineland-Palatinate, Germany. It stands on a crag approximately 160 metres (520 ft) above sea level on the left bank of the river at the mouth of the Steeg valley, approximately 50 kilometres (31 mi) south of Koblenz, and offers a commanding view of the Lorelei valley. Its name means "impregnable castle on a crag", from the Middle High German words stahel (steel) and ecke (here: crag). It has a water-filled partial moat, a rarity in Germany. Built on the orders of the Archbishop of Cologne, it was destroyed in the late 17th century but rebuilt in the 20th and is now a hostel.

== History ==
=== Beginnings ===
From about 1000 AD, Bacharach is presumed to have been a possession of the Archbishops of Cologne. They had the castle built, perhaps as a southern outpost to guard the far-flung archbishopric; their Vogt resided there. It is uncertain when the present castle was built to replace an earlier fortification; perhaps around 1135. It was the first large castle north of Bingen and Rüdesheim.

A "Gozwin von Stalecke" is first mentioned in charters in 1120–21. This was Goswin von Falkenburg, who is also referred to in 1135 by the Latin translation "Cozwinus de Staelechae" and was the first attested holder of the castle in fief. He was a member of a Main-Frankish family and had come into possession of the castle through marriage to Luitgard von Hengebach, the widow of Heinrich I of Katzenelnbogen, who died in 1102. From then on he called himself Goswin von Stahleck.

=== Seat of the Counts Palatine by Rhine ===
In 1125, Goswin's son Hermann married Gertrud of Swabia, sister of King Conrad III of Germany. After receiving Stahleck Castle in fief from his brother in law in 1140, he was additionally granted the County of Palatinate by Rhine. This made him one of the greatest lords of the Holy Roman Empire and the Four Valley Region, which consisted of the settlements of Bacharach, Steeg (now part of Bacharach), Diebach and Manubach plus the castles of Stahleck, Fürstenberg and Stahlberg, and made Stahleck the centre of power of the heart of what later became the Rhineland territory of the Counts Palatine. They developed Bacharach into a trading town, among other things for the wine trade, and the castle was thus used to enforce payment of duties. When he went on the Second Crusade, Conrad made Hermann his regent.

After Hermann's death in 1156, Emperor Frederick Barbarossa bestowed the title of Count Palatine on his half-brother Conrad of Hohenstaufen. After the death of his remaining son in 1189, Conrad's only heir was his daughter Agnes. So that the castle and the title could remain in the family, that year King Henry VI commuted the fief from a personal to a hereditary one. In the future this led to repeated conflicts between the Counts Palatine and the See of Cologne, since Stahleck was a possession of the Electoral Archbishop and not the king's to modify.

It was her father's wish for Agnes to marry King Philip II of France, but instead when Conrad was away from the castle in January or February 1194, she secretly married Henry the Elder of Brunswick, son of his enemy the Welf Duke Henry the Lion, to whom she had previously been engaged; the marriage, performed by Johann I, Archbishop of Triers, is known as the Stahleck Marriage or the Bacharach Marriage. After Conrad's death, Henry succeeded him as Count Palatine and so came into possession of the castle. However, in 1212 he renounced the title and the rights associated with it in favour of his son Henry the Younger. When the latter died young and childless in 1214, his younger sister Agnes inherited Stahleck. The non-allodial remainder of the County reverted to the Crown and was subsequently bestowed on the Bavarian Duke Ludwig I of the House of Wittelsbach.

=== Wittelsbach ownership ===
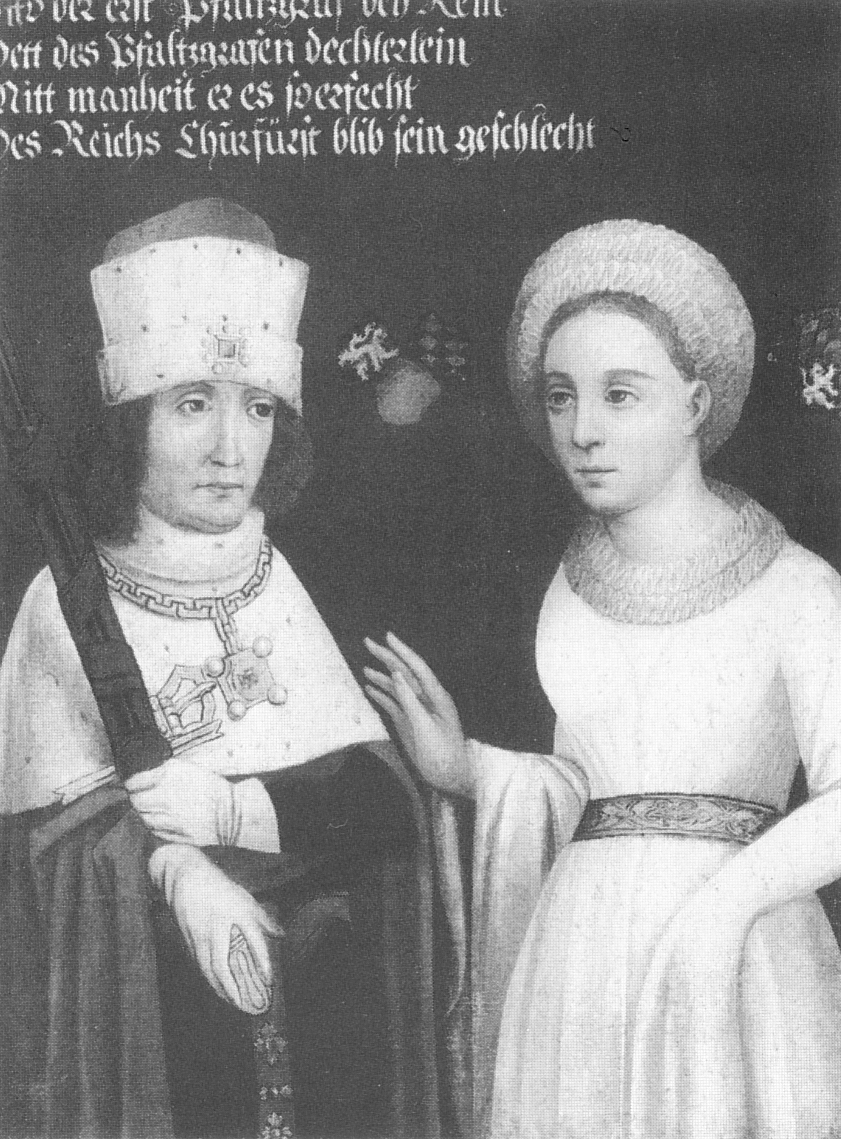
Otto II of Bavaria and Agnes of the Palatinate in a 16th-century painting based on a 15th-century original

In order to secure possession also of the castle and the overseership of Bacharach, Ludwig I arranged a marriage in 1222 between his son Otto and Agnes. Under Otto (Otto II) in 1243, the long-running conflict with the Archbishopric of Cologne was settled, and he received Fürstenberg and Stahlberg Castles as additional fiefs.

Ludwig I transferred his primary residence to Heidelberg, so that from then on, Stahleck was used only occasionally and was overseen by counts, who called themselves "Ritter (Knight) von Stahleck". From the 15th century on, it was administered by bailiffs. However, although the castle was no longer the administrative centre of the Palatinate, important gatherings of the nobility continued to take place there into the 15th century, including the election of Ludwig IV as King of Germany in May 1314 and the wedding of Emperor Charles IV and Anna, only daughter of Rudolf II, Count Palatine, on 4 March 1349. In addition, the castle was used several times during the 14th century as a pledge. In December 1314, to cover the costs of his election, Ludwig IV pledged it for 58,300 pounds of Hellers to John of Luxembourg, King of Bohemia, and his uncle Baldwin, Electoral Archbishop of Triers. In July 1328, they were required to surrender Stahleck and also Stahlberg and Braunshorn Castles as security for a fine payable to Countess Loretta of Sponheim. The castle was thus administered by Count Wilhelm I of Katzenelnbogen as regent until the entire sum of 11,000 pounds had been paid. The castle was also opened for military use to Gerlach of Nassau, Archbishop of Mainz, in 1346.

In 1353, the Palatinate was divided and Stahleck Castle passed to Rupert the Younger, after which it was incorporated into the fortifications around the town of Bacharach. In late 1400, Rupert's son, also named Rupert, celebrated there his election as King of Germany and Rome after the deposition of King Wenceslaus of Luxembourg. In 1408, Rupert hosted a banquet for the Electors of the Holy Roman Empire, but after that Stahleck gradually lost its importance for the empire. In 1442 Ludwig IV, Count Palatine, held a reception and electoral banquet there for King Frederick of Habsburg as he was en route to Aachen to be crowned Emperor, but during the 15th and 16th centuries the castle sank into insignificance.

=== Destruction in the 17th century ===
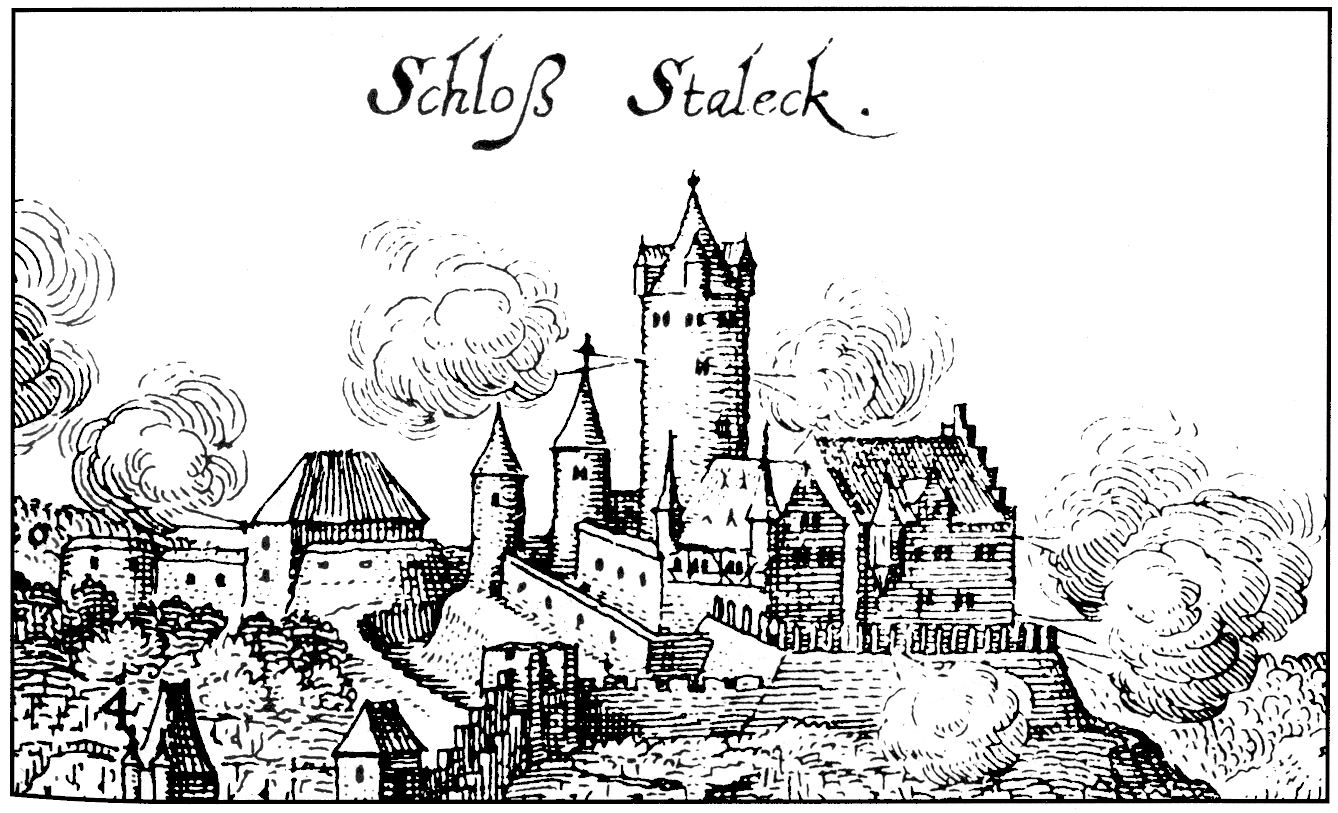
Spanish forces defend Stahleck Castle against recapture by Swedes in 1632; engraving by Matthäus Merian, 1646

After the introduction of cannon, an artillery platform was added to the medieval castle on the northeast side to cover the access route, but its exact date of construction is unknown. Despite this, the castle was besieged, conquered, and sacked a total of eight times during the Thirty Years' War. On 4 October 1620, it and the town of Bacharach were taken by Spanish troops commanded by Ambrogio Spinola, but the Spaniards were evicted by Protestant Swedes on 9 January 1632. The castle was heavily damaged during the siege leading up to its recapture. A copper engraving in Matthäus Merian's 1646 Topographia Germaniae depicts the battle.

In July 1635, Imperial troops under Matthias Gallas, Count of Campo, successfully besieged Stahleck. They were evicted four years later, in July 1639, by Weimaran soldiers, but the castle was then occupied by Bavarian troops in March 1640. They stayed only a short time, and after their withdrawal the Weimaran troops reoccupied the castle and the town. In autumn 1640, after a 14-day siege, Spanish troops once more took their place.

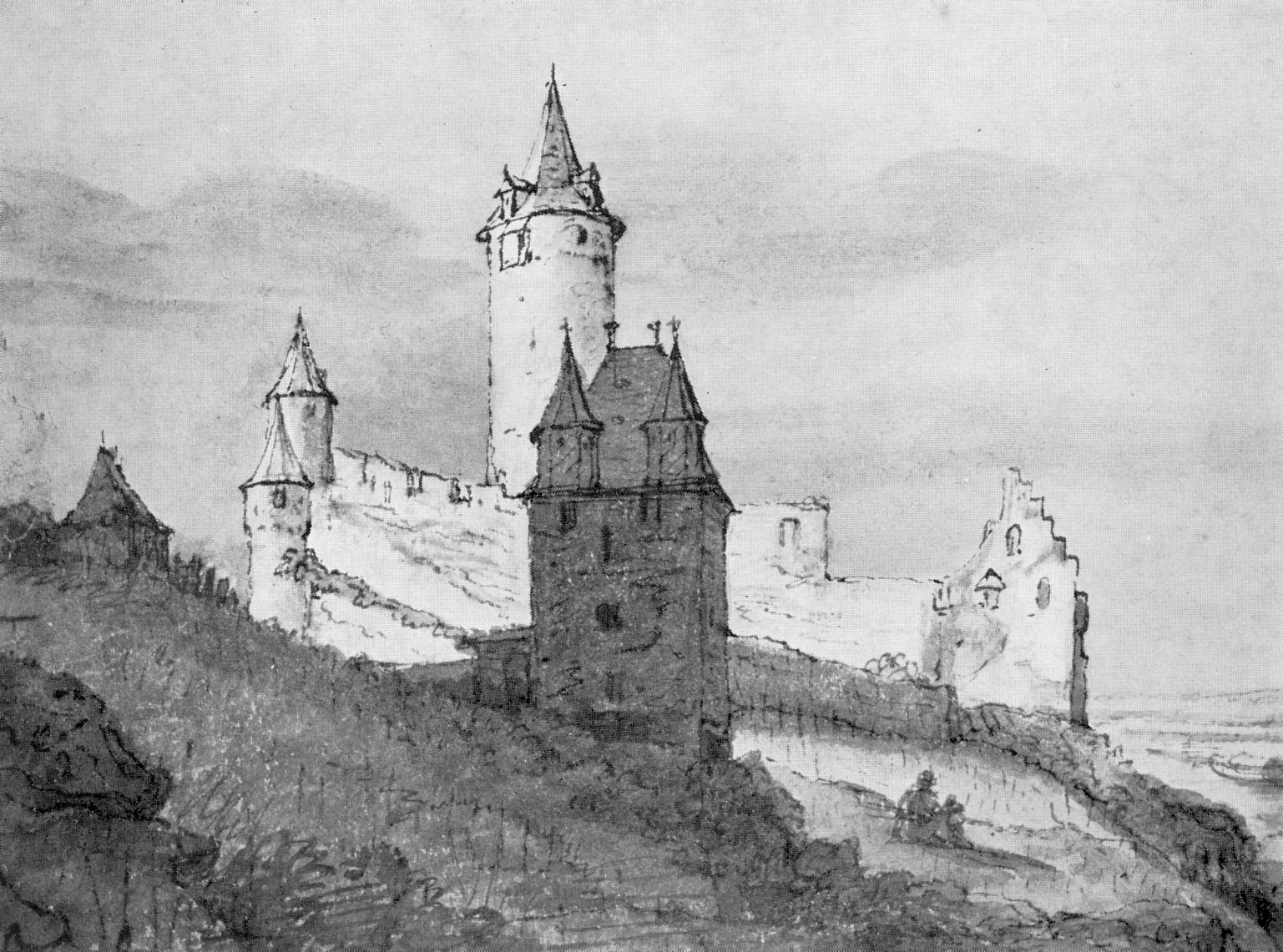
Stahleck Castle in 1663, with damage from the Thirty Years' War; drawing by Lambert Doomer

In September 1644, the castle and the town were taken by French soldiers after a 10-day siege; the following month, Cologne troops attacked them and forced them to retreat to the castle with heavy losses. The Cologne commander, Constantin von Nievenheimb, therefore ordered the bombardment and "more or less ruination" of the castle, but did not attempt to capture it. The French soldiers remained until 24 July 1650 but had to vacate the castle under the terms of the Peace of Westphalia, which returned it to the Palatinate and Count Palatine Karl Ludwig. In 1666, he had the castle repaired and made some alterations: he greatly changed the interior of the palas and between it and the northern rampart built a massive new building with a Fachwerk half-timbered upper storey. An inscribed stone tablet on the palas commemorates his rebuilding of the castle.

During the War of the Palatine Succession, the castle was decisively destroyed, like most of the fortifications in the Upper Middle Rhine Valley. Its commander, von Dachenhausen, surrendered it to French troops on 11 October 1688, but on 15 March 1689 they blew it up. The explosion completely destroyed both the ring wall and the keep, the residential buildings burned out in the resulting fire, and debris from the explosion destroyed the Gothic Werner Chapel at the foot of the castle hill. The castle was so heavily damaged that it was not rebuilt. Under the 1697 Treaty of Ryswick, the ruin reverted to the Palatinate, where it remained until the dissolution of the County at the end of the 18th century.

=== French and Prussian ownership ===
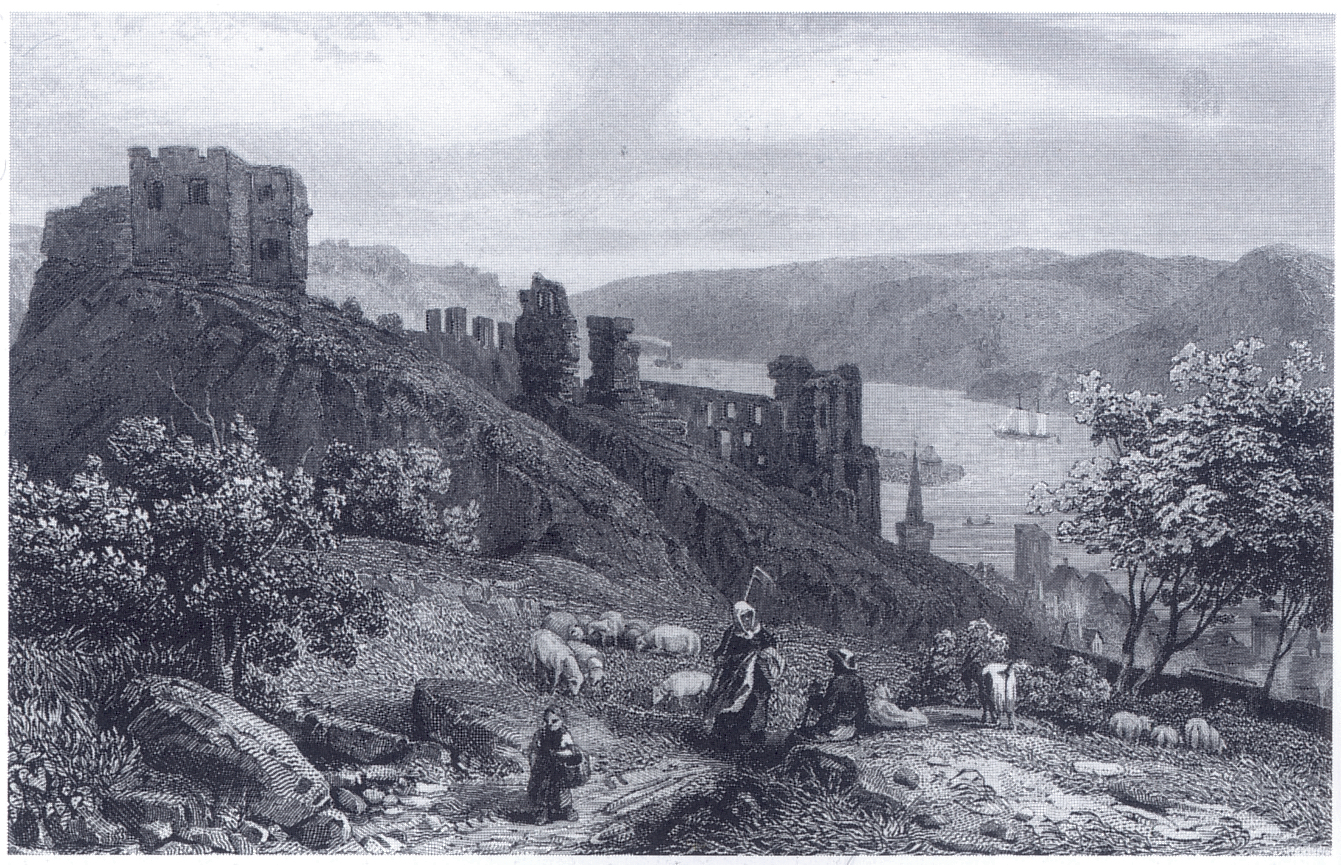
The ruined castle in an 1840 engraving

After the occupation of the parts of the Palatinate on the left bank of the Rhine by French Revolutionary troops in 1794, in 1801 the Treaty of Lunéville awarded the ruined castle to the French; in 1804 they offered it for sale. In 1815 the Congress of Vienna resulted in its passing into the possession of the Kingdom of Prussia. In 1828 the then Crown Prince Frederick William acquired it in order to give it to his wife Elisabeth Ludovika of Bavaria; she was a Wittelsbach princess. In association with a visit by her in the 1850s, large parts of the toppling walls were cleared, and the rubble spread over the courtyard and used to fill the moat. All that remained was the wall of the palas on the courtyard side, the ring wall on the Steeg valley side to the height of the chemin de ronde and a small piece of the inner or shield wall.

The ruined castle became well known among romantics and nationalists and was often depicted in the 19th century. Beginning in 1907, Axel Delmar had plans for a home for artists in the ruins of the castle, but the Prussian royal family refused to sell the site.

=== 20th-century rebuilding ===
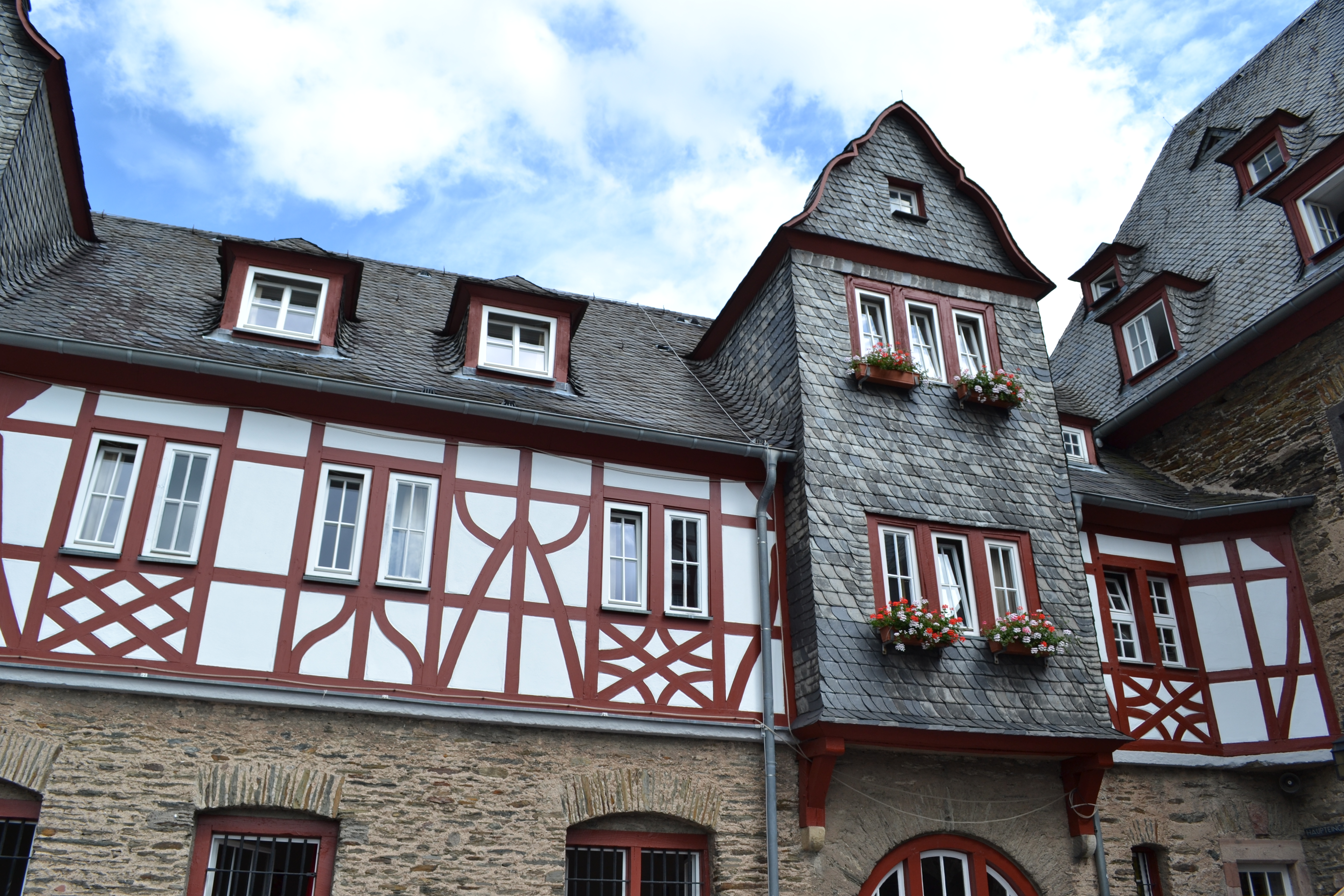
20th century rebuilding work done on Stahleck

The first work to stabilise and rebuild the ring wall and shield wall, costing 3,500 marks, began only in 1909, after the ruin had been transferred from the Prussian Crown to the Rhenish Association for Landmark Preservation and Landscape Protection. The Association was able to raise the 5,000 mark purchase price through donations. Work was interrupted by World War I, and the castle suffered further vandalism and decay. In 1924 Richard Blankenhorn, the owner of the villa above the castle, wished to start a business in the ruins, but there was no response for 5 years to his enquiry concerning a lease.

Early in 1925 the decision was taken to construct a youth hostel at the castle. Firm plans were made in March of that year. The Association contracted with the architect Ernst Stahl to "build in the ruin, in the spirit of the old buildings and making use of the old walls, a building which [would] fit well into the landscape". Financing of the initial work was ensured by an endowment of 50,000 ℛ︁ℳ︁.

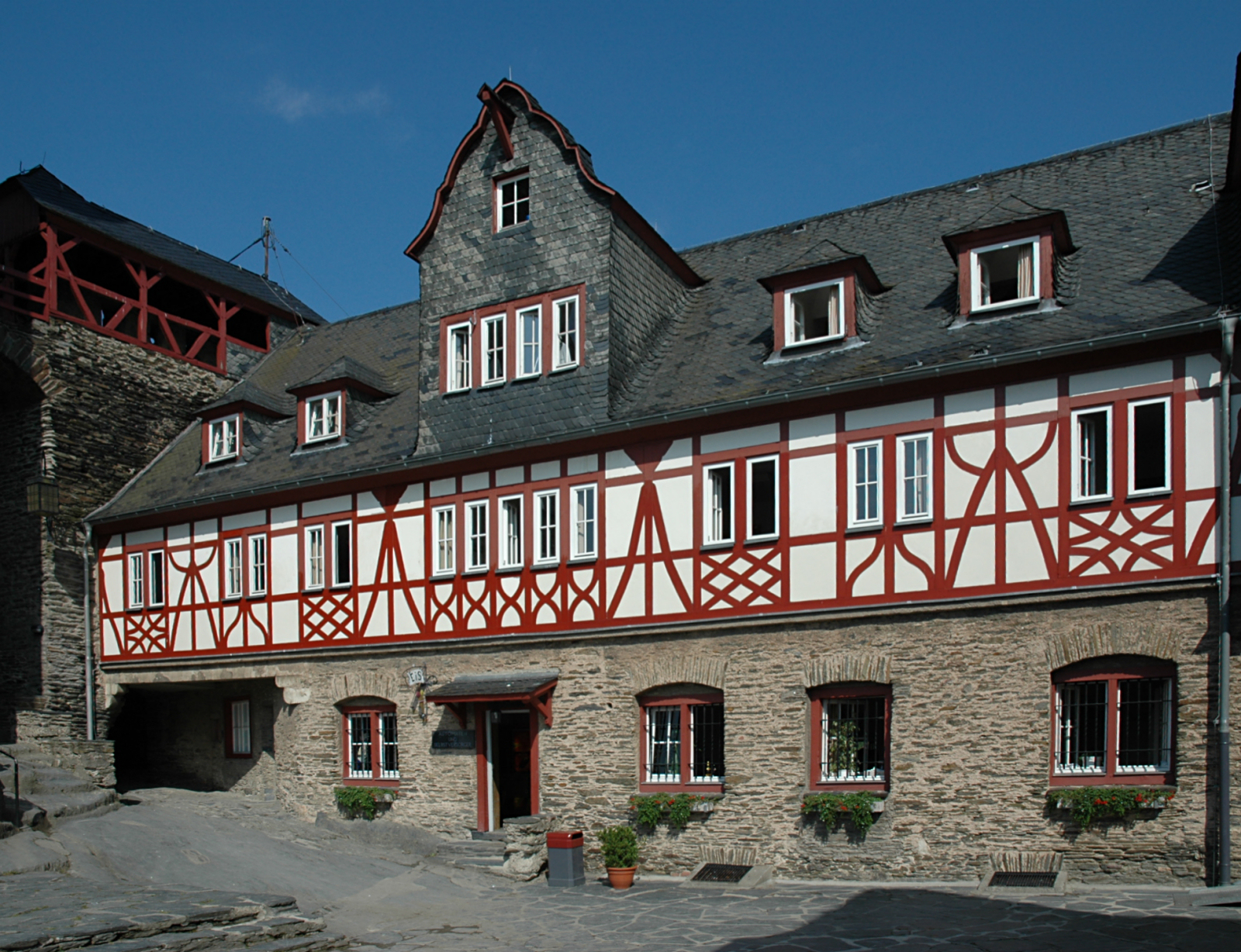
Longhouse, built as a boys' hostel in 1925–26

Stahleck became the Association's prestige project. The intention was to completely rebuild the castle. Stahl based his designs on historical models and appended them to remaining structures, but changed his plans again after ancient, previously unknown building foundations came to light in excavations beginning in August 1925. The excavations and the attendant repeated surveying of the site delayed the start of building to late summer 1925. The first building, the longhouse, was intended as a hostel for boys. On the first floor, executed in Fachwerk, were a flat for the hostel manager and an adjacent dormitory with washroom. On the ground floor, built in crushed stone, were the kitchen and a day-room, while the top floor, which has dormers on the courtyard side, housed further sleeping and washing space. The design adhered as far as possible to the use of space in the old castle. An old cellar at the east corner of the site was rebuilt and roofed over in reinforced concrete to make a viewing terrace. Further excavations took place parallel to the construction work, and recovered stones were used as building material in rebuilding the ring wall and the foundation of the keep.

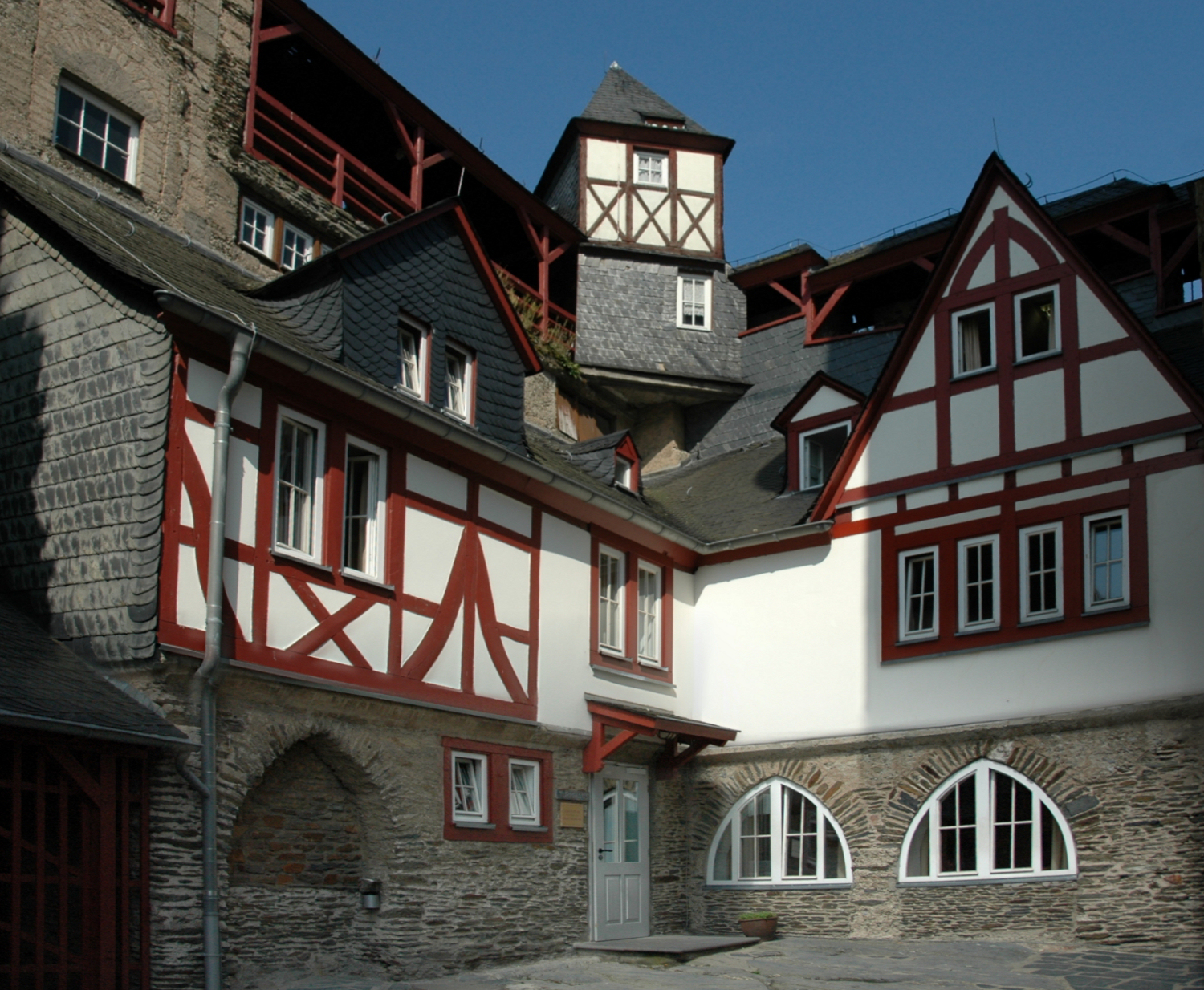
Tower building, formerly girls' hostel, completed in 1927

The official dedication of the youth hostel took place on 12–13 June 1926 and was followed by a second building phase, from autumn 1926 to July 1927, in which the tower building, with two wings at right angles and a turret at the angle, was built as a girls' hostel on the foundations of two Fachwerk buildings against the shield wall. The ground floor consisted of a large day-room; on the first floor were a large dormitory, washrooms and living and sleeping space for matrons. Further sleeping space was under the single-pitched roof, and in addition there was a 4-bed room inside the turret. Rebuilding of the entire ring wall and the shield wall lasted until 1927.

Once open, the youth hostel was almost always oversubscribed, leading to problems with the water supply. Insufficient water frequently led to a complete ban on washing. The problem was alleviated by tapping a new source of water on the western hillside.

In 1929, the keep, with two holes in it from the explosion, was finally stabilised to a height of 3 m. The hole on the east side was used as an entrance to the tower. Also in 1929, the day-rooms were redecorated with dados and murals. In 1930–31, the ground floor of the ruined palas was rebuilt, to make a dining hall, a dishwashing room, and a flat for the hostel manager. In 1932, work was done on clearing the rubble from the moat.

=== Under National Socialism ===
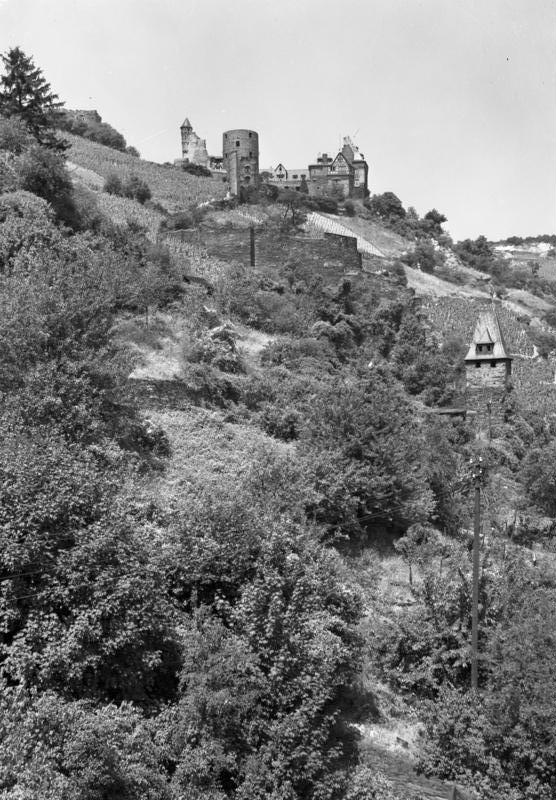
Stahleck Castle in the 1930s, with new hostel buildings and unfinished keep

Since there was still insufficient space in the hostel, which had over 30,000 overnight stays in 1934, the palas was completely rebuilt, providing 260 beds. The ceremonial laying of its foundation stone took place on 18 November 1934. The work, which took only 11 months, cost 25,000 ℛ︁ℳ︁ and included addition of a kitchen, another Fachwerk building, on the south side. On 25 October 1935, the rebuilt building was officially dedicated. In the presence of members of the Hitler Jugend, the Deutsches Jungvolk, the Bund Deutscher Mädel, and both the SA and the SS, Gauleiter Gustav Simon gave the dedicatory address. Stahleck became one of 27 Jugendburgen (youth castles), to be used for indoctrination of teenagers and young adults. Between 1937 and early 1938, the turrets on the shield wall were built and its chemin de ronde roofed over. A visit by Rudolf Hess in June 1938 prompted the start of work to complete the rebuilding of the keep, which was still a ruined stump. The plan was to reconstruct it to a height of 36 m, 7 storeys, and name it the Rudolf Hess Tower. However, the existing foundations would not have been able to bear the weight, so the ruin was pulled down, and in November 1938, work began on a completely new tower on a smaller footprint. Work on this was interrupted by the outbreak of World War II.

From 1940 to 1942, the castle served as a military hospital. In addition, in November 1940, students from now occupied Luxembourg who had been studying at German and Austrian universities when the war began were forced to attend re-education classes there, and eventually a youth re-education camp was set up. Male schoolchildren and students from Esch-sur-Alzette and Echternach were interned at the castle for 4 months as punishment for protesting against the announcement in 1942 of the introduction of required military service in Luxembourg and the forced conscription associated with it, as well as for participating in the general strike which followed. (Girls were sent to a youth hostel at Adenau.) Those of military age were then sent to the front. There is a memorial plaque at the castle, and the State of Rhineland-Palatinate and the City of Bacharach have organised memorial events at which contemporary witnesses spoke.

Beginning in January 1943, the castle was used as an internment camp for German youth who had shown insufficient loyalty to the Party, such as the founders of the Catholic youth resistance group the Michael Troop; some were taken from Stahleck to concentration camps. From June 1943 to summer 1944, it was a work and military training camp for Germans between 14 and 18 years of age.

=== After the war and today ===
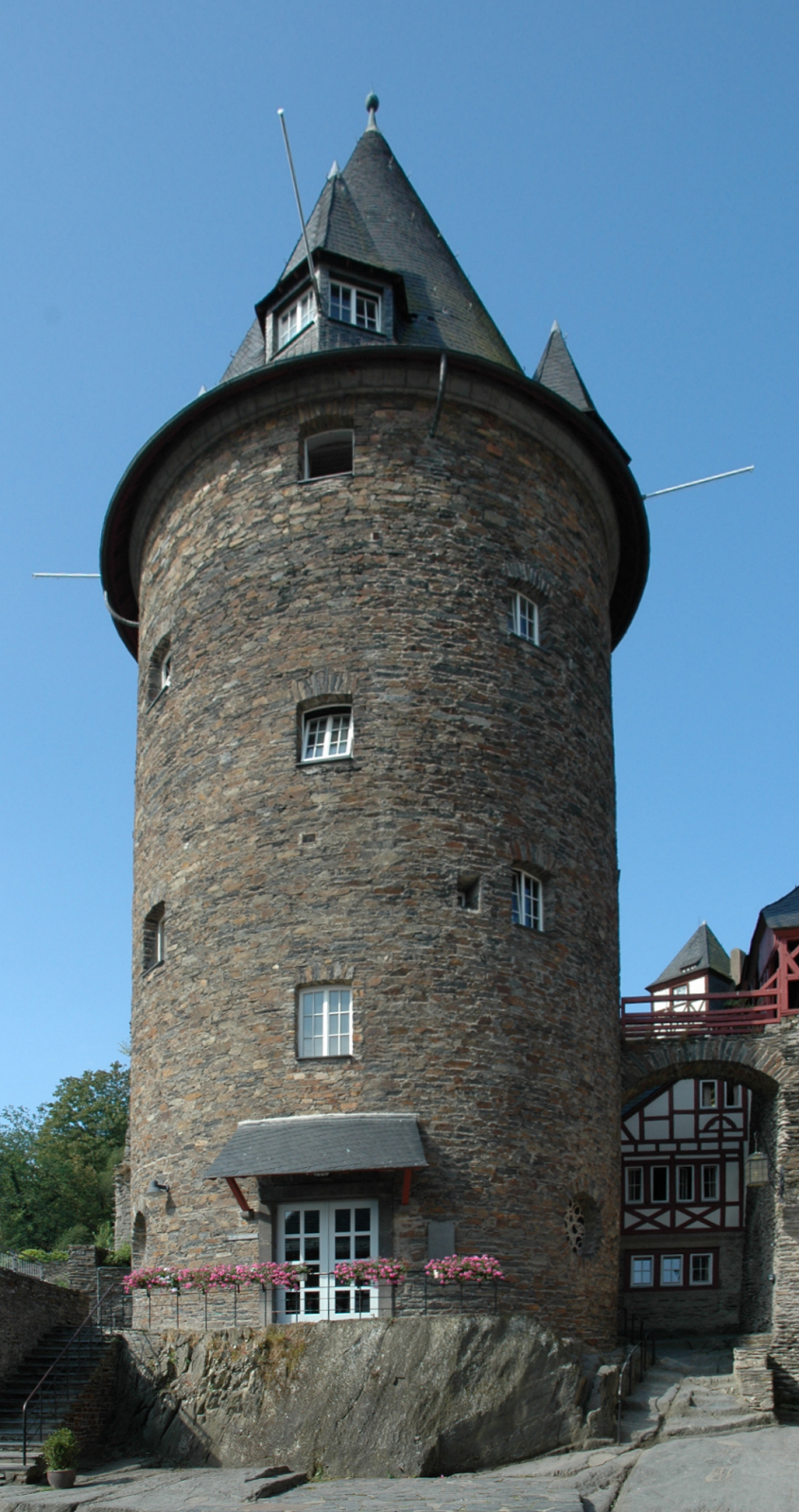
The keep (bergfried), completed in 1966–67

Following the end of the war, Stahleck Castle was first used to billet French soldiers, before returning to use as a youth hostel in November 1947. The Health and Welfare Ministry of Rhineland-Palatinate opened a youth leadership school at the castle in January 1948 to train prospective hostel managers and staff, but was forced to close it at the end of the same year because of the state's poor financial situation. The hostel itself, however, was unaffected. In 1957 the castle offered 270 beds and 60 emergency spaces and was thus the third largest youth hostel in Rhineland-Palatinate, after those in Koblenz and Mainz. In terms of overnight stays, it was in second place with 32,276.

Beginning in October 1965, a further building programme was carried out at the castle under government superintendent of works Heinrich Grimm, based on the plans of Stahl, who had died in 1957. This included interior modernisation and renovation and a new administration building. In addition, a large terrace was created on the south side, and beginning in 1966 the still incomplete keep was built up a further 4 m and topped with a tall cone-shaped roof. The ceremonial reopening took place on 20 May 1967.

The castle is still used as a hostel, now leased by the Rhineland-Palatinate Youth Hostel Association. It currently offers 168 beds and has approximately 42,000 overnights per year. It is almost always booked up. In the 1990s the non-visitor facilities were once more modernised at a cost of DM 8.3 million.

== Architecture ==
=== Until 1689 ===
A series of archaeological excavations between 1925 and 1927 revealed many previously hidden foundations of medieval buildings at the castle site, making it possible to reconstruct what was there before the castle was destroyed in 1689. According to the evidence, since the Middle Ages, Stahleck Castle had 3 entrances. One was a double gate reached by steps from the Rhine Valley, leading into a small, elongated zwinger, from which entry to the castle was through a double-barred door in the northern shield wall, 8 m from the northwest corner. The former main gate was in the west corner, on the site of today's main entrance, and could be reached either from the northern zwinger or by way of a drawbridge from a group of outbuildings to the southwest. The main gate led to a gate zwinger and an inside gate from which a narrow passage led to the courtyard. The third entrance consisted of a small door in the outside wall of the southern zwinger, which was parallel to the ring wall and had a round tower at the south corner.

Immediately inside the northern ring wall was a longish building with a stone residential building attached to its northern end. Its ground floor was divided into several small rooms, and at the south end there was a timber-framed building whose outside wall was the southern defensive wall. Two more timber-framed buildings stood on the west side in the shelter of a shield wall which protected the castle on the side where the hillside is higher. The buildings thus enclosed a long, narrow inner courtyard, in the centre of which was a round Romanesque keep (bergfried), with an outside wall 4 m thick.

Water was supplied to the castle by a well sunk into the hillside within the shield wall. It was connected by a tunnel at a depth of approximately four metres to the moat outside the walls.

Finds of fragments of early Gothic vaulting and of a Gothic window showed that the castle had a chapel. Until then, the only evidence had been a mention in the 1471 testament of Ruprecht of the Palatinate, Archbishop of Cologne. It is impossible to know exactly where the chapel was, but it is presumed to have been on the first floor of the palas, where Merian's engraving shows a small bay window on the Rhine side of the building.

In addition to the still existing artillery platform on the southwest side, there was a bastion in the northeast.

=== Today ===
The castle today is a 20th-century reconstruction, primarily based on the results of excavation and the 1646 engraving by Matthäus Merian. The rebuilding plans were mostly the work of Ernst Stahl, who closely followed Merian's depiction and used other historical models where the engraving gave no information. For example, the almost rectangular shape of the castle, measuring approximately 55 by 24 m, shows the typical regular layout and clear divisions of a castle of the Hohenstaufen period. The size of the modern buildings approximates that of those in the original castle; the oldest portions are the foundations of the keep, parts of the cellar under the palas and sections of the curtain wall.

Since the castle is used as a hostel, it is not available for tours. However, the courtyard is accessible to the public and offers a fine view of the Rhine, since on that side there is only a low parapet.

==== Palas ====
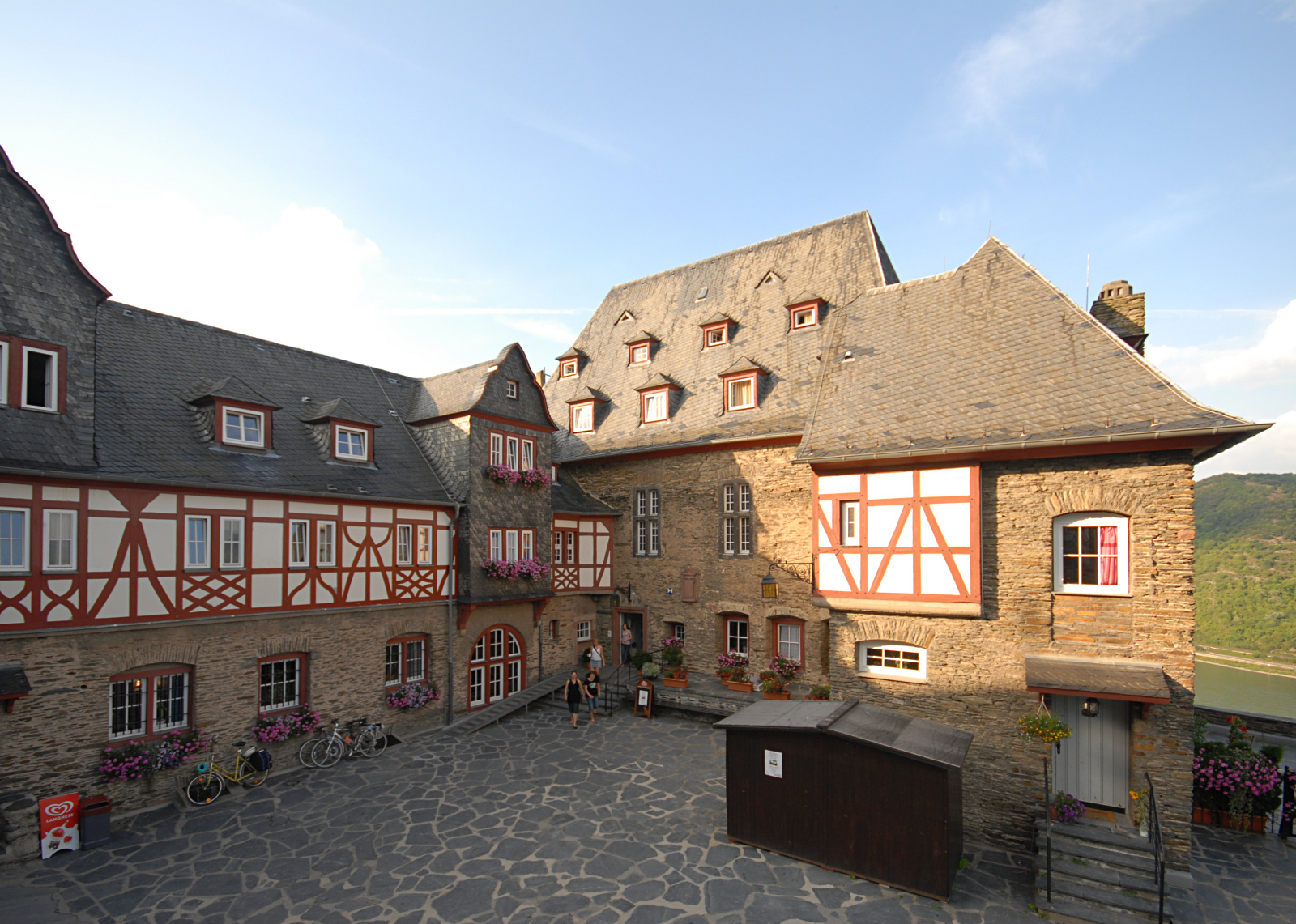
The palas, between the longhouse (left) and the kitchen building (right)

The palas (residential building) is 2 storeys high, built of crushed stone lined with Rhenish Schwemmstein (a traditional artificial material made of dried pumice and lime, similar to concrete), and stands at the eastern, Rhine valley end of the courtyard, over a vaulted cellar that Ernst Stahl dated to the time of Conrad of Hohenstaufen. It has a shingled hip roof 10 m high. Adjoining it on the southwest side is the so-called kitchen building, with Fachwerk first floor, which today is the residence of the hostel managers.

On the courtyard side, a red sandstone tablet commemorates Duke Karl Ludwig's rebuilding of the castle. The inscription reads:

CARL LVDWIG PFALTZGRAF CHVRFÜRST ERNEVERT MICH ANNO 1666 (Carl Ludwig, Count Palatine [and] Elector, remade me in the year 1666)

Of the numerous details that Stahl once envisaged incorporating in the rebuilding of the castle, only the windows and chandeliers of the great hall exist today. The 11 windows of the hall, made of stained glass by the Düsseldorf glass painter Richard Gassen, depict the most important events in the history of the castle and the arms of the people or institutions of the Rhine Province in the 1920s. They are framed by versions in basalt which can only be seen from outside. The room has an oak plank floor and holds approximately 100 people.

==== Bergfried ====
Although documentary evidence leads to the conclusion that the castle was built in the 12th century at the latest, the archaeological investigations have been unable to provide proof. Stahl believed, however, that the preserved foundations of the bergfried (keep) should be dated to the 12th century. The keep is a round tower 7.5 m in diameter which stands on bedrock in the centre of the inner courtyard. It has walls 2 metres thick and is topped by a 16 m cone-shaped roof. The top floor, 4 m high, was added later, which can be seen from the different colour of the stone.

==== Shield wall and main entrance ====
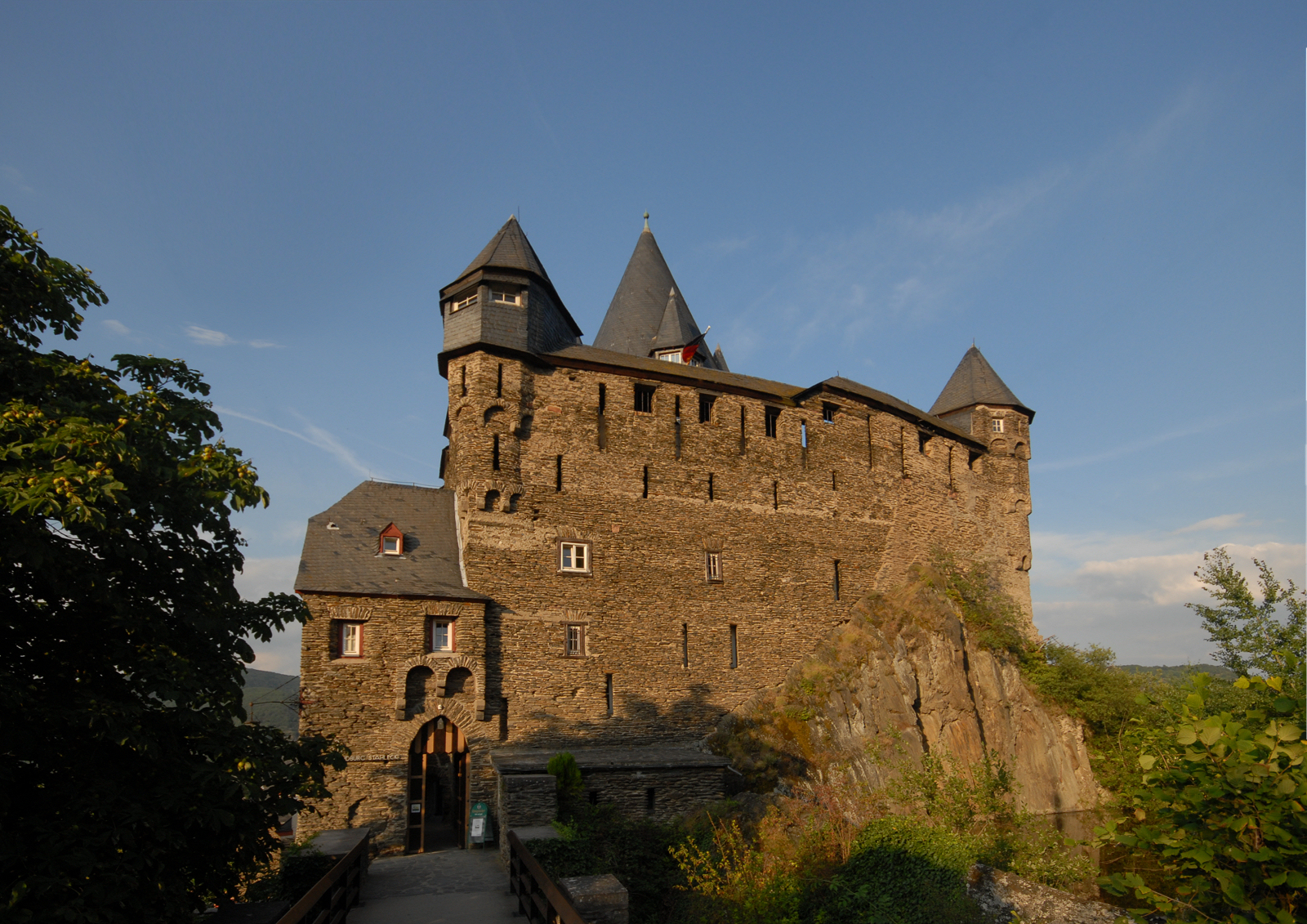
Main gate and shield wall

The castle is defended from the high hillside on the west by a chemise wall which has been fortified to form a shield wall 2.6 m thick. There is an interior stairway, which does not, however, reach as far as the roofed chemin de ronde at the top of the wall; it is used to reach the upper floors of the 1930s tower building. Some of the tall, narrow embrasures were subsequently walled closed at the base and fitted with wooden frames to absorb the recoil of early firearms. Their fishtail shape indicates that the wall dates to the first half of the 14th century. At the top they are flanked on both sides by polygonal turrets which replaced two earlier round towers.

Below the shield wall is a moat cut out of the rock. A section of this measuring 18 by 13 metres is separated off and filled with water, doubling as a cistern. A stone bridge leads over the moat to the main entrance; the gateway is guarded by an embrasured turret above and leads to an elongated zwinger.

==== Other structures ====
The former boys' hostel is now called the longhouse. It has a ground floor of crushed stone and a Fachwerk first floor. The slate roof has a dormer on the courtyard side with a curved gable.

What is now known as the tower building, formerly the girls' hostel, stands against the shield wall. It resembles the longhouse in its details.

A walled platform cut out of the rock a little above the castle to the southwest is a post-medieval position for artillery aimed at the hillside which was an important part of the castle's defences after the introduction of gunpowder. Its precise date is unknown, but Matthäus Merian's 17th-century engraving shows that it existed by 1646.

== Sources ==
- Gabriele Nina Strickhausen-Bode. Stahls Stahleck: Ernst Stahl (1882-1957) und der Neuaufbau von Burg Stahleck am Rhein. Braubach: Deutsche Burgenvereinigung, 2007, ISBN 978-3-927558-26-7
- Stefan Grathoff, Burg Stahleck at regionalgeschichte.net (in German)

== Gallery ==
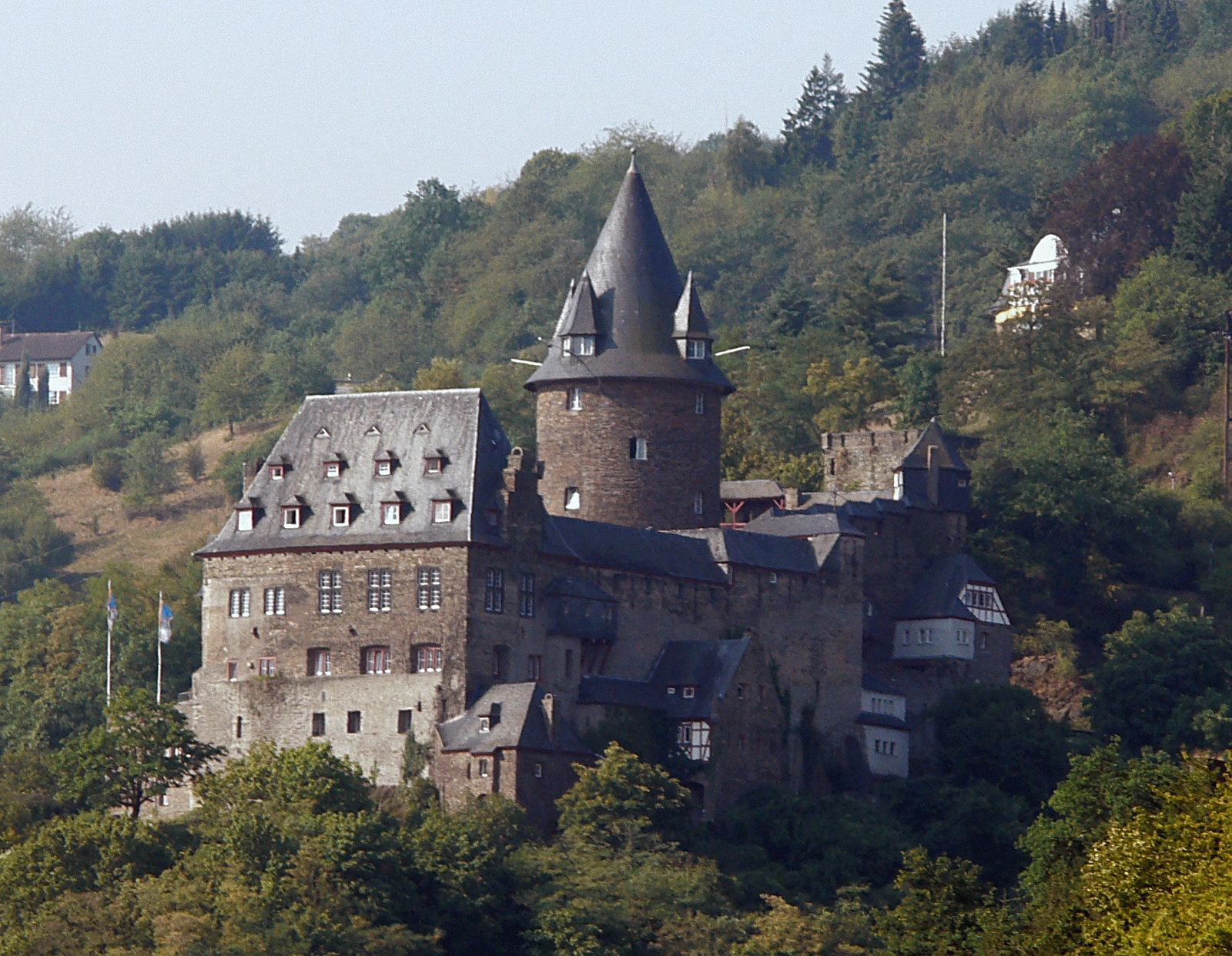
The castle viewed from the northeast across the Rhine

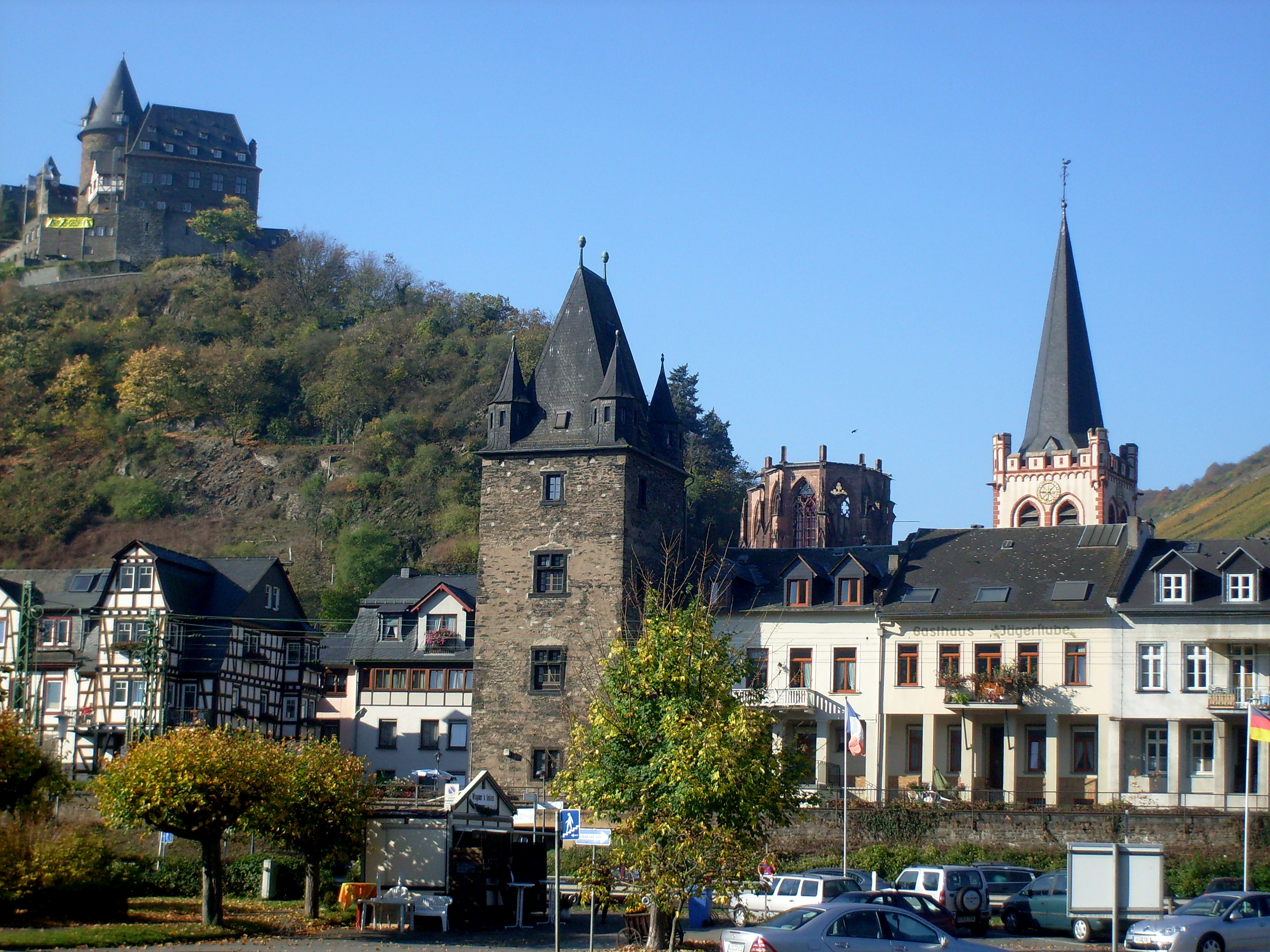
The castle and Bacharach and the ruined Werner chapel below

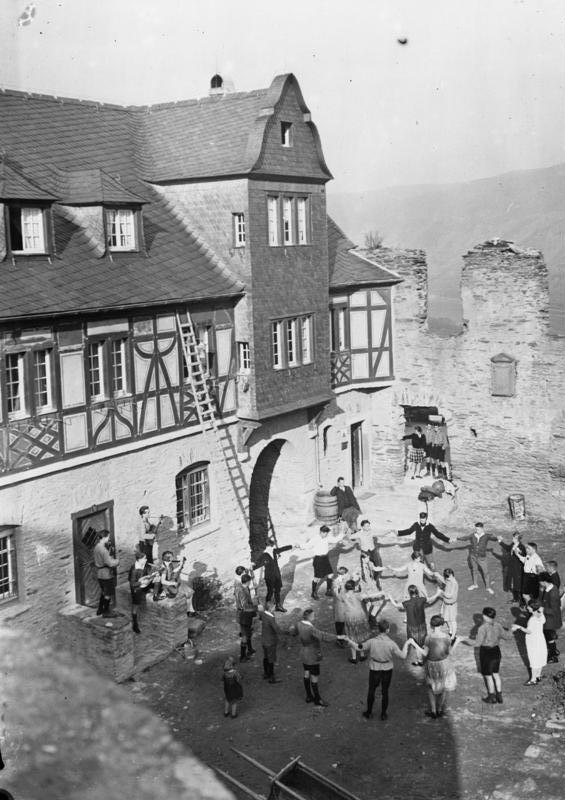
Hostellers in the courtyard, April 1932

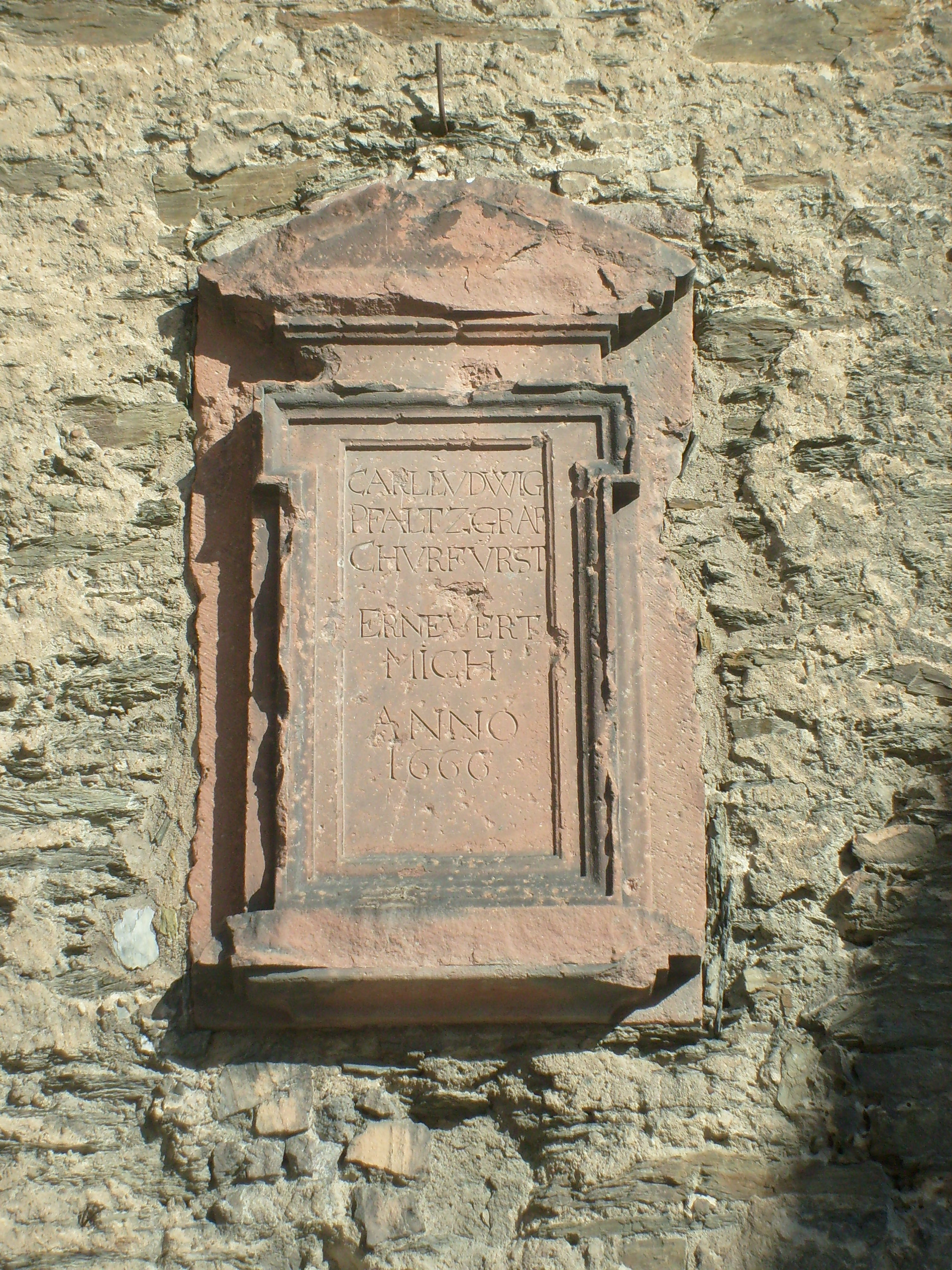
Plaque commemorating rebuilding by Duke Karl Ludwig in 1666

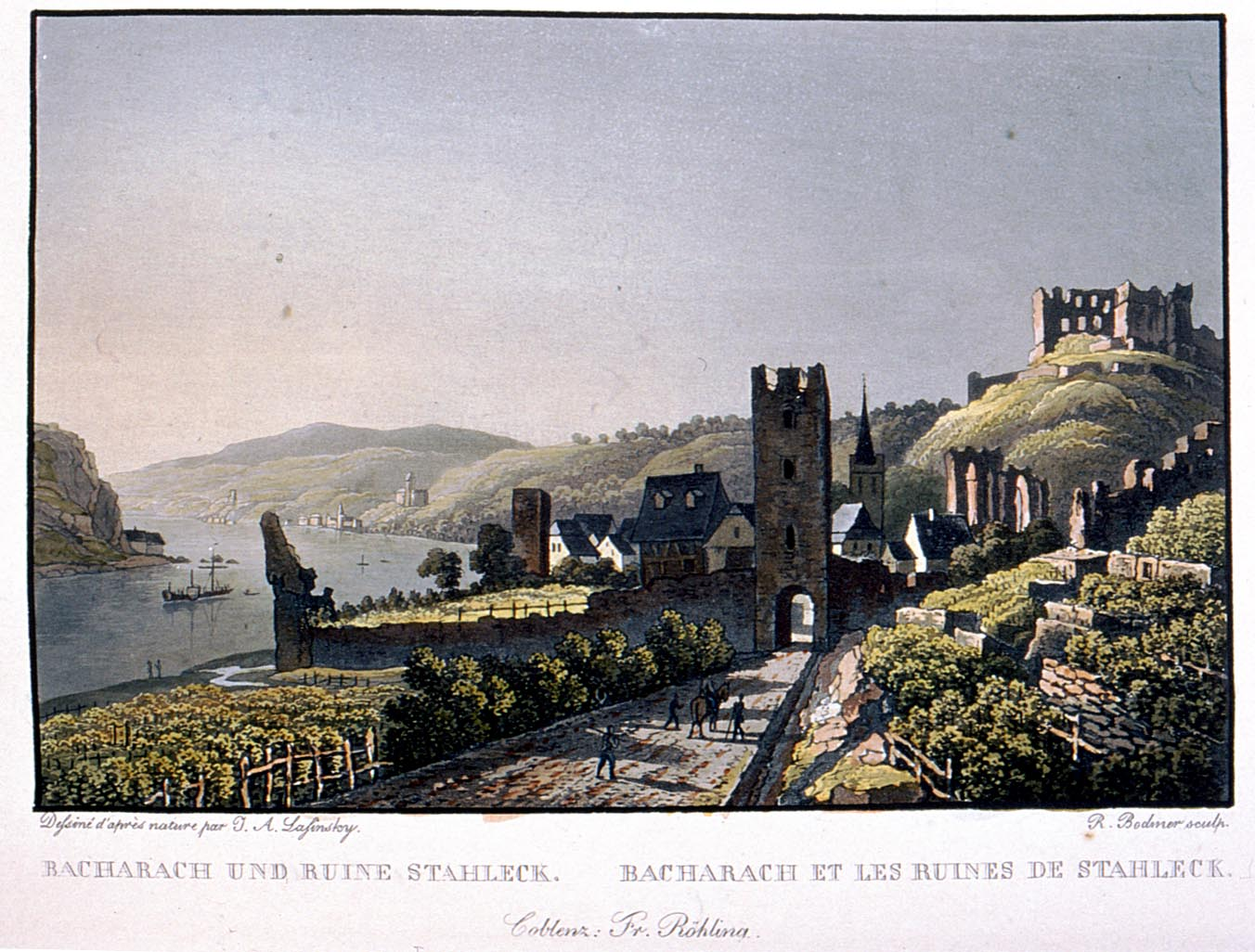
The ruined castle above Bacharach, by Rudolf Bodmer, circa 1830

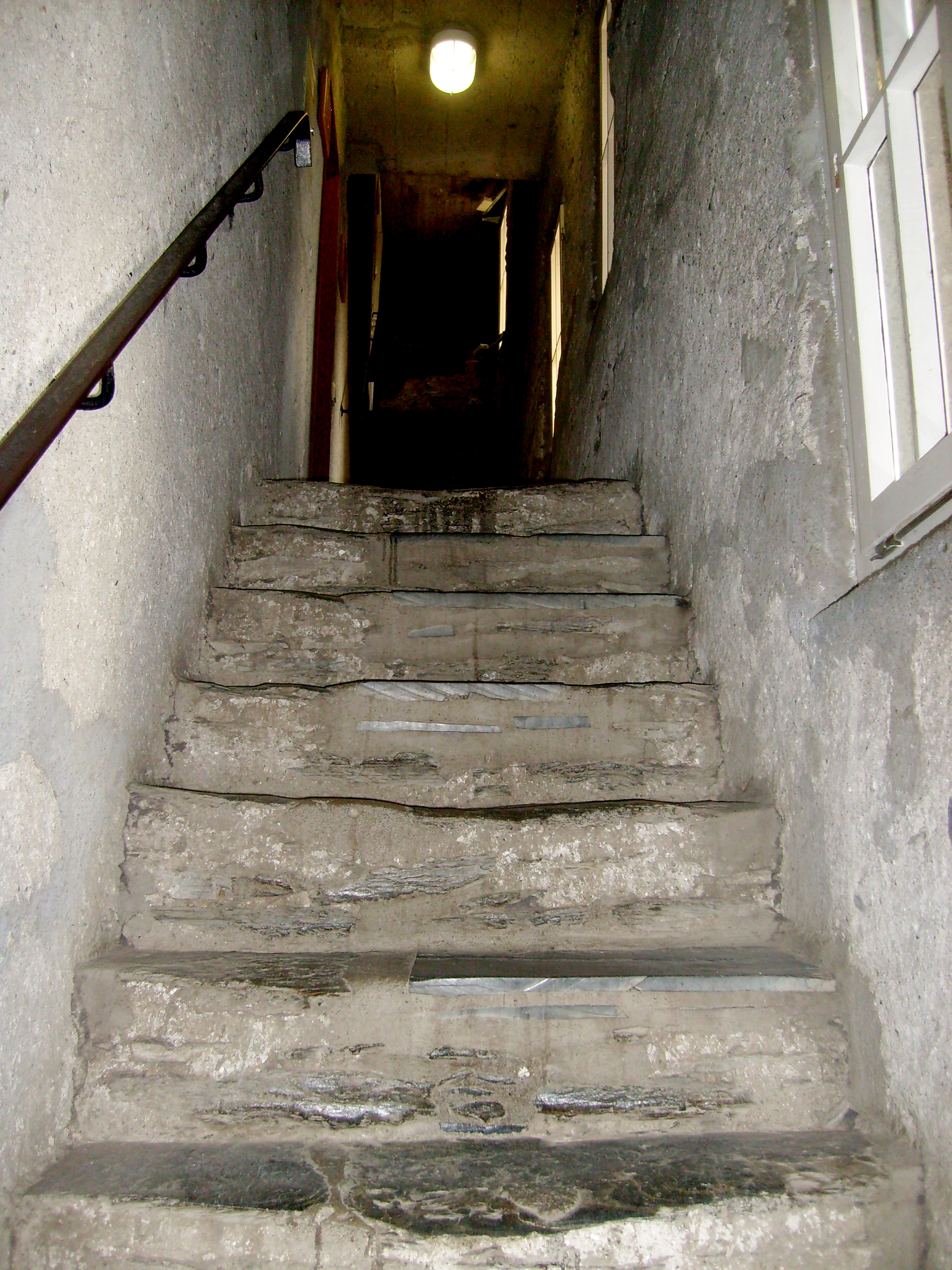
Stairs inside the shield wall

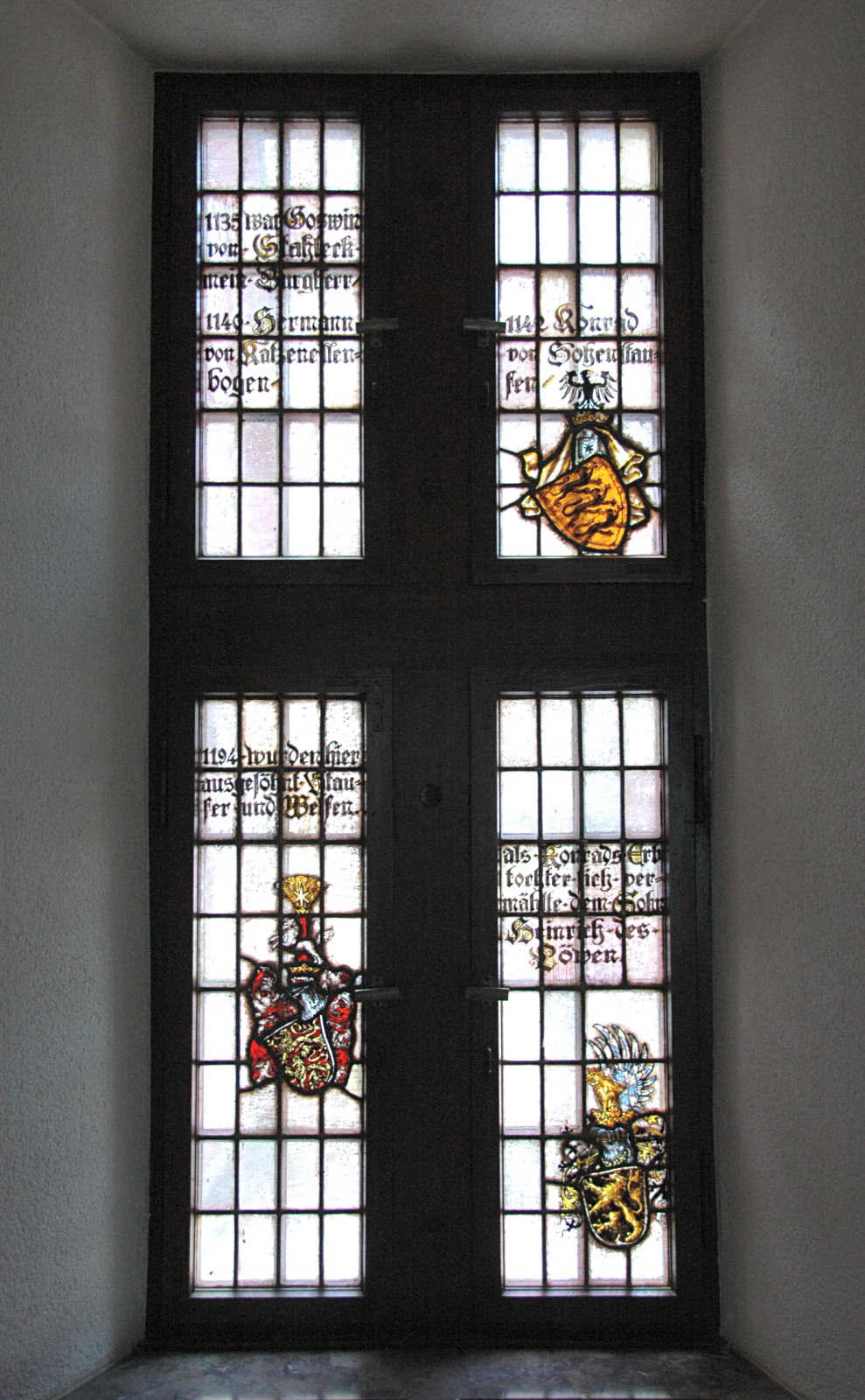
Stained glass coats of arms in the great hall windows
