= Electoral Palatinate =

State of the Holy Roman Empire (1085–1803)

Electorate of the Palatinate Kurfürstentum Pfalz (German)
- 1085–1803
- Top: Flag until 1776; Bottom: Flag design of 1604 Electoral arms (1356–1803)

- The Electoral Palatinate in 1618
- Status: Imperial Estate
- Capital: Heidelberg; (1085–1690); Düsseldorf; (1690–1720); Mannheim; (1720–1803); 49°30′N 8°01′E
- Common languages: German; Palatine German
- Religion: Pre-1556 Roman Catholic, thereafter Protestant
- Government: Hereditary monarchy
- Elector
  - 1085–1095: Henry of Laach (first)
  - 1799–1803: Maximilian Joseph (last)
- Historical era: Middle Ages; Renaissance
  - Demotion of the Count Palatine of Lotharingia: 1085
  - Confirmed as Electorate: 10 January 1356
  - Peace of Westphalia: 15 May – 24 October 1648
  - Subsumed by Bavaria: 30 December 1777
  - Treaty of Lunéville: 9 February 1801
  - Annexed by Baden: 27 April 1803
Preceded by
| Rhenish Franconia |
| Margraviate of the Nordgau |
| Bohemian Palatinate |
| Palatinate-Sulzbach |
| Palatinate-Neuburg |
Succeeded by
| Electorate of Baden |
| Mont-Tonnerre |
| Electorate of Bavaria |
- Today part of: Germany; France

The Electoral Palatinate (Note: /pəˈlætɪnɪt/ (German: Kurpfalz [ˈkuːɐ̯ˌpfalts]) or the Palatinate (Pfalz [pfalts]), officially the Electorate of the Palatinate (Kurfürstentum Pfalz [ˈkuːɐ̯ˌfʏʁstn̩tuːm -])) was a constituent state of the Holy Roman Empire until it was annexed by the Electorate of Baden in 1803. From the end of the 13th century, its ruler was one of the prince-electors who elected the Holy Roman emperor, ranking them among the most significant secular Princes of the Holy Roman Empire.

The Palatinate consisted of a number of widely dispersed territories, ranging from the left bank of the Upper Rhine in the modern state of Rhineland-Palatinate, adjacent parts of the French regions of Alsace and Lorraine to the opposite territory on the east bank of the Rhine in present-day Hesse and Baden-Württemberg up to the Odenwald range and the southern Kraichgau region, containing the capital cities of Heidelberg and Mannheim.

In 1541, Otto Henry, Elector Palatine converted to Lutheranism, and in 1618 his Calvinist descendant, Frederick V, sparked the Thirty Years' War by accepting the Crown of Bohemia. Occupied until the 1648 Peace of Westphalia, the Palatinate suffered extensive damage during the 1688 to 1697 Nine Years' War. Ruled in personal union with the Electorate of Bavaria from 1777, the Palatinate was annexed by Baden in 1803, before being absorbed by Bavaria in 1805.

== History ==
=== Background ===
Arms of the Duke of Lotharingia

A position of Count Palatine at the Frankish court of King Childebert I was mentioned about 535. The Counts Palatine were the permanent representatives of the king in particular geographic areas, in contrast to the semi-independent authority of the dukes (and their successors). Under the Merovingian dynasty, the position had been a purely appointed one, but by the Middle Ages had evolved into an hereditary one.

Up to the tenth century, the Frankish empire was centered at the royal palace (Pfalz) in Aachen, in what had become the Carolingian kingdom of Lotharingia. Consequently, the Count Palatine of Lotharingia became the most important of the Counts Palatine. Marital alliances meant that, by the Middle Ages, most Count Palatine positions had been inherited by the duke of the associated province, but the importance of the Count Palatine of Lotharingia enabled it to remain as an independent position.

In 985, Herman I, a scion of the Ezzonids, is mentioned as count palatine of Lotharingia (which by then had been divided into Upper and Lower Lotharingia). While his Palatine authority operated over the whole of Upper Lorraine, the feudal territories of his family were instead scattered around south-western Franconia, including parts of the Rhineland around Cologne and Bonn, and areas around the Moselle and Nahe rivers.

In continual conflicts with their rivals, the Archbishops of Cologne, he changed the emphasis of his rule to the southern Eifel region and further to the Upper Rhine, where the Ezzonid dynasty governed several counties on both banks of the river. The southernmost point was near Alzey.

Palatine Lion, arms of the Count Palatine

From about 1085/86, after the death of the last Ezzonian count palatine Herman II, Palatinate authority ceased to have any military significance in Lotharingia. In practice, the Count Palatinate's Palatine authority had collapsed, reducing his successor (Henry of Laach) to a mere feudal magnate over his own territories – along the Upper Rhine in south-western Franconia. From this time on, his territory became known as the County Palatine of the Rhine (not because Palatine authority existed there, but as an acknowledgment that the Count still held the title, if not the authority, of Count Palatine).

Various noble dynasties competed to be enfeoffed with the Palatinate by the Holy Roman Emperor – among them the House of Ascania, the House of Salm (Count Otto I of Salm in 1040) and the House of Babenberg (Henry Jasomirgott in 1140/41).

The first hereditary Count Palatine of the Rhine was Conrad, a member of the House of Hohenstaufen and younger half-brother of Emperor Frederick Barbarossa. The territories attached to this hereditary office in 1156 started from those held by the Hohenstaufens in the Donnersberg, Nahegau, Haardt, Bergstraße and Kraichgau regions (other branches of the Hohenstaufens received lands in the Duchy of Swabia, Franche-Comté, and so forth). Much of this was from their imperial ancestors, the Salian emperors, and apart from Conrad's maternal ancestry, the Counts of Saarbrücken. These backgrounds explain the composition of Upper and Rhenish Palatinate in the inheritance centuries onwards. About 1182, Conrad moved his residence from Stahleck Castle near Bacharach up the Rhine river to Heidelberg.

Territory of the Palatinate (1329) along the Rhine

Upon Conrad's death in 1195, the Palatinate passed to the House of Welf through the (secret) marriage of his daughter Agnes of Hohenstaufen with Henry of Brunswick. When Henry's son Henry the Younger died without heirs in 1214, the Hohenstaufen king Frederick II enfeoffed the Wittelsbach Duke Louis I of Bavaria, whose son, Otto II of Bavaria, married Agnes of the Palatinate, daughter of Henry of Brunswick and Agnes of Hohenstaufen, in 1222. The Bavarian House of Wittelsbach eventually held the Palatinate territories until 1918.

During a later division of territory among the heirs of Duke Louis II, Duke of Upper Bavaria, in 1294, the elder branch of the Wittelsbachs came into possession of both the Rhenish Palatinate and the territories in the Bavarian Nordgau (Bavaria north of the Danube River). As this region was politically connected to the Rhenish Palatinate, the name Upper Palatinate (German: Oberpfalz) became common from the early 16th century in contrast to the Rhenish Palatinate (Rheinpfalz) along the Rhine.

With the Treaty of Pavia in 1329, the Wittelsbach Emperor Louis IV, a son of Louis II, returned the Palatinate to his nephews Rudolf and Rupert I.

The Palatinate (1505)

In the Golden Bull of 1356, the Palatinate was recognized as one of the secular electorates, and given the hereditary offices of archsteward (German: Erztruchseß, Latin: Archidapifer) of the Empire and imperial vicar (Reichsverweser) of Franconia, Swabia, the Rhine, and southern Germany. From that time forth, the Count Palatine of the Rhine was usually known as the Elector Palatine (German: Kurfürst von der Pfalz, Latin: Palatinus elector). In 1386, Rupert I helped establish the University of Heidelberg, the oldest University in Germany.

In 1400, the Elector Palatine, Rupert III, was elected as King of the Romans, but he was never crowned as Holy Roman Emperor because he was defeated in Italy while attempting to travel to Rome for a coronation.

Due to the practice of dividing territories among different branches of the family, by the early 16th century junior lines of the Palatine Wittelsbachs came to rule in Simmern, Kaiserslautern, and Zweibrücken in the Lower Palatinate, and in Neuburg and Sulzbach in the Upper Palatinate. The Elector Palatine, now based in Heidelberg, adopted Lutheranism in the 1530s; when the senior branch of the family died out in 1559, the electorate passed to Frederick III of Simmern, a staunch Calvinist, and the Palatinate became one of the major centers of Calvinism in Europe, supporting Calvinist rebellions in both the Netherlands and France. Elector Frederick IV became the leader of the Protestant Union in 1608.

=== Thirty Years' War ===
In 1619, the Protestant Frederick V, Elector Palatine, accepted the throne of Bohemia from the Bohemian Diet. This initiated the 1618–1648 Thirty Years' War, one of the most destructive conflicts in human history; it caused over eight million fatalities from military action, violence, famine, and plague in the vast majority in the German states of the Holy Roman Empire. In terms of proportional German casualties and destruction, it was surpassed only by the period January to May 1945 and remains the single greatest war trauma in German memory.

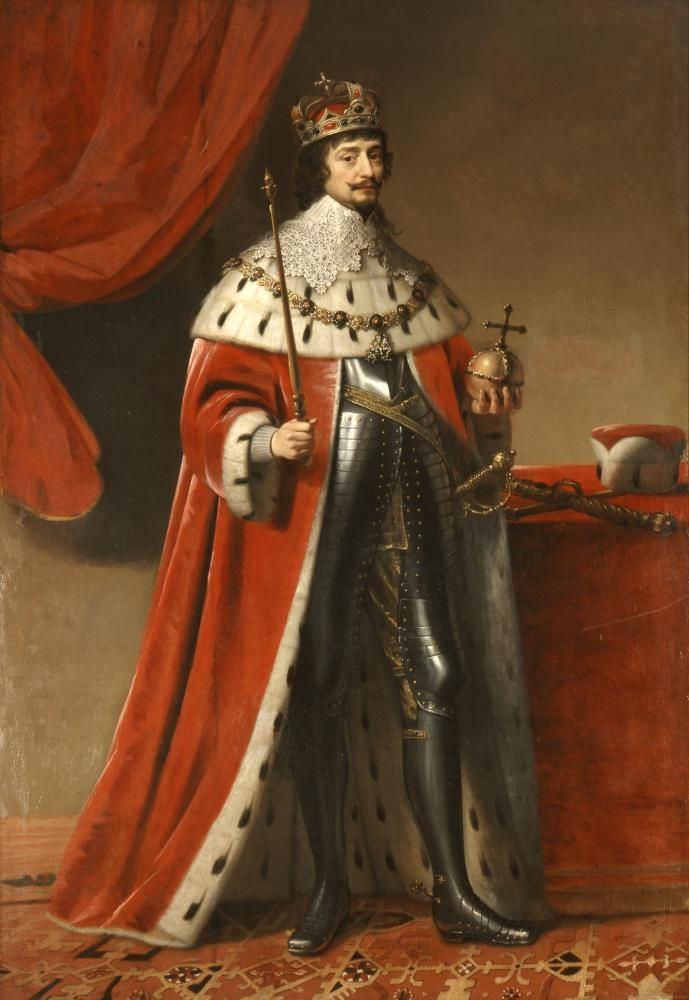
Frederick I, King of Bohemia (1619–1620)

Frederick was evicted from Bohemia in 1620 following his defeat by the forces of Ferdinand II, Holy Roman Emperor, at the Battle of the White Mountain. Over the period 1621–1622, the Palatinate was occupied by Spanish and Bavarian troops and Frederick was exiled to the Dutch Republic. His territories and electoral rights were transferred to the distantly related but Catholic Maximilian I of Bavaria, Duke of Bavaria and now Prince Elector Palatine.

After his death in 1632, Frederick's daughter Princess Elizabeth and wife Elizabeth Stuart, Queen of Bohemia, worked tirelessly to have the Palatinate restored to her son Charles Louis and the Protestant cause. When the Peace of Westphalia ended the war in 1648, he regained the Lower Palatinate and the title 'Elector Palatine' but now ranked lower in precedence than the others. He was succeeded by Charles II, Elector Palatine, in 1680, but the Simmern branch became extinct in the male line after he died in 1685.

In 1670, Charles II's sister Elizabeth Charlotte of the Palatinate married Philippe of Orléans, younger brother of Louis XIV; on this basis, Louis claimed the Rhineland territories of the Palatinate for France. However, he was outmaneuvered by Leopold I, Holy Roman Emperor, whose third wife was Eleonore-Magdalena of Pfalz-Neuburg, eldest daughter of Philip William, a Catholic who was the closest male heir in the direct line. Leopold installed his father-in-law as Elector Palatine, ensuring that his electoral vote and this strategic region remained in Imperial control.

=== Nine Years' War ===
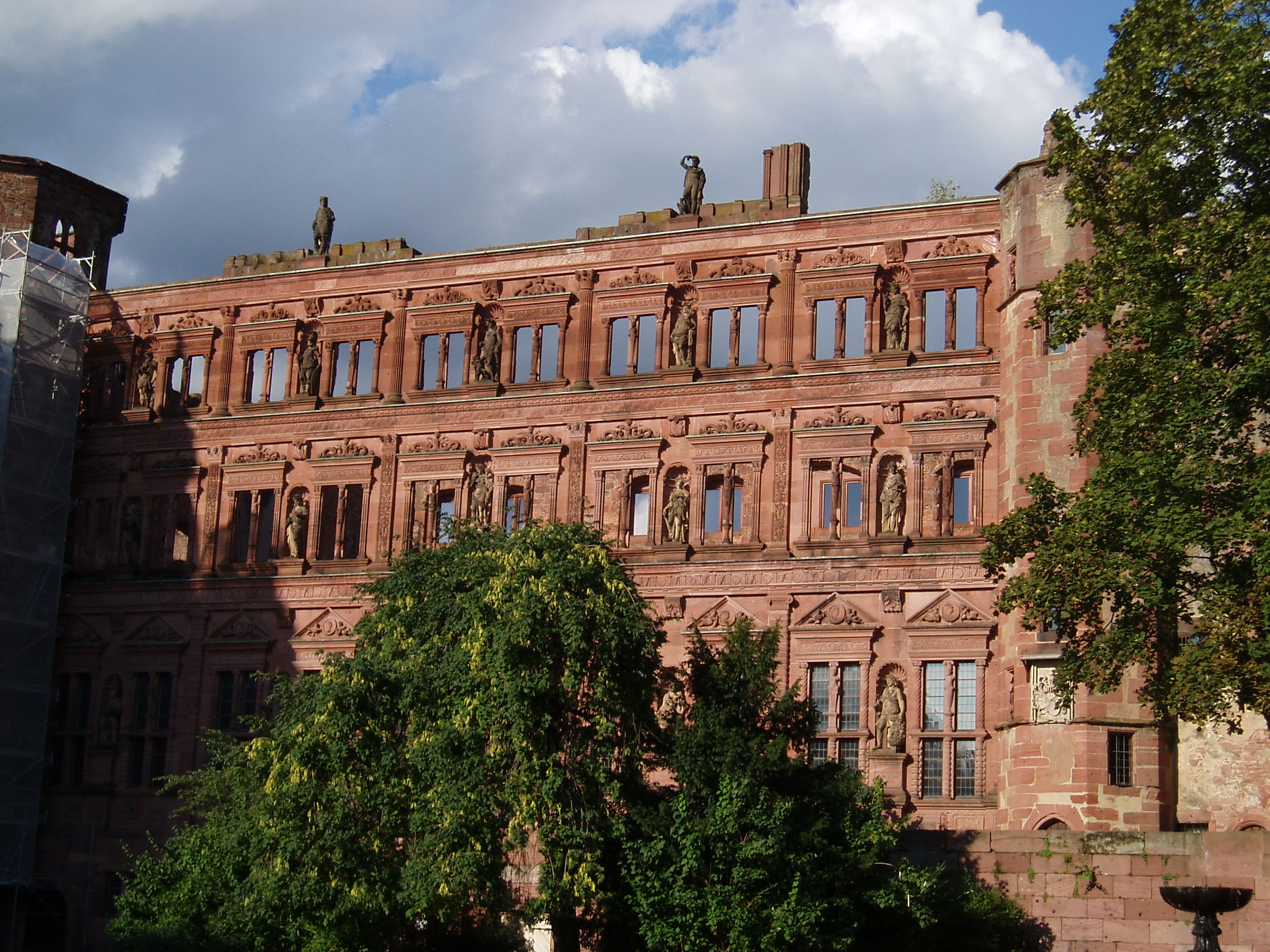
Heidelberg Castle, destroyed by the French in 1689 and never rebuilt

When France invaded the Palatinate in September 1688 to enforce its claim, these wider connections meant the conflict rapidly escalated, leading to the outbreak of the Nine Years' War. The French were forced to withdraw in 1689 but before doing so, destroyed much of Heidelberg, another 20 substantial towns and numerous villages. This destruction was systematically applied across a large section of the Rhineland but especially the Palatinate, which was raided again in 1693; the devastation shocked much of Europe. France later renounced its claim to the region in the 1697 Treaty of Ryswick.

Johann Wilhelm succeeded as elector in 1690, changing his residence first to Düsseldorf, then back to Heidelberg and finally Mannheim in 1720. Like his father, he was a Catholic, which under the 1555 Peace of Augsburg meant the Protestant majority in the Palatinate was theoretically obliged to convert to Catholicism. The 1705 'Palatine Church Division' compromised by allocating five-sevenths of public church property to the Reformed or Calvinist church and the remainder to Catholicism, while excluding the Lutheran Church, whose membership exceeded 40% of the population in some areas.

In 1716, Charles Philip succeeded his brother as elector and in January 1742, helped his cousin Charles Albert become the first non-Habsburg emperor in over 300 years. He died in December and the Palatinate passed to Charles Theodore, then Duke of Sulzbach, who also inherited the Electorate of Bavaria in 1777. The title and authority of the two electorates were combined, Charles and his heirs retaining only the vote and precedence of the Bavarian elector, although continuing to use the title 'Count Palatine of the Rhine'.

=== Mediatization ===
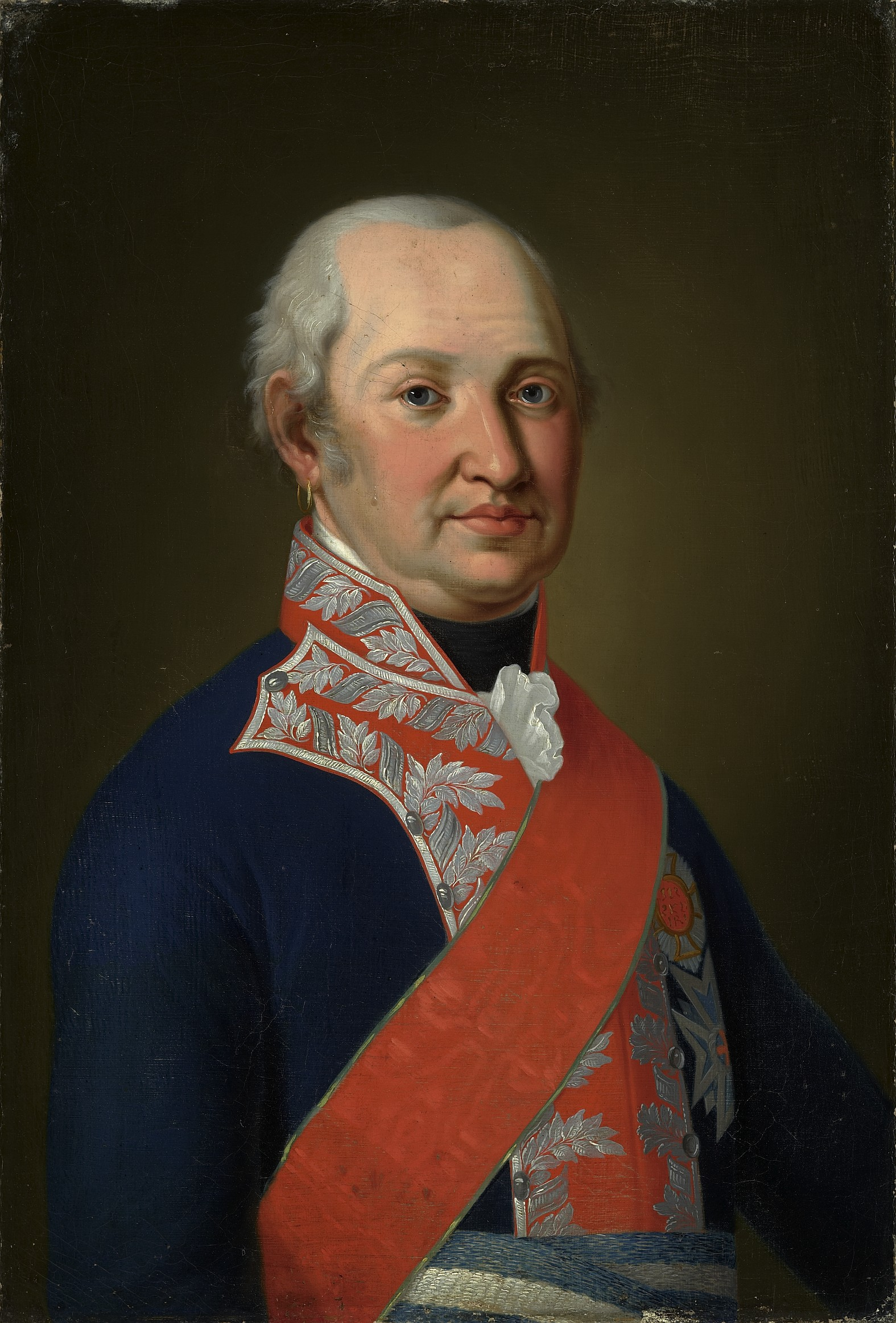
Maximilian Joseph, Elector of Bavaria (1799–1806)

The Palatine territories on the left bank of the Rhine were annexed by France in 1795, mainly becoming part of the Mont-Tonnerre department. In 1799 Elector Charles Theodore died and the territory was inherited by the Duke of Palatine Zweibrücken, uniting all the Wittelsbach lands. The loss of the left bank territories was accepted by the new Elector Maximilian Joseph in the Treaty of Paris. Those on the right were taken by the Elector of Baden, after the 1805 Peace of Pressburg dissolved the Holy Roman Empire; the remaining Wittelsbach territories were united by Maximilian Joseph as the Kingdom of Bavaria.

== Coat of arms and flag ==
In 1156 Conrad of Hohenstaufen, brother of Emperor Frederick Barbarossa, became Count Palatine. The old coat of arms of the House of Hohenstaufen, the single lion, became coat of arms of the Palatinate.

By marriage, the Palatinate's arms also became quartered with those of Welf and later Wittelsbach. The arms of Bavaria were used with reference to the elector's holdings in Bavaria. This was extended to quartering of the lion and the Bavarian Arms upon the ascension of Maximilian I to the position of elector of the Palatinate in 1623, used concurrently with the arms shown. From 1356 onwards, the orb represented their position as Arch-Steward of the Holy Roman Empire.

Coats of arms

House of Hohenstaufen (before confirmation as Electorate)

House of Wittelsbach (Electoral Palatinate)

House of Palatinate-Simmern (Electoral Palatinate)

House of Palatinate-Simmern (variant)

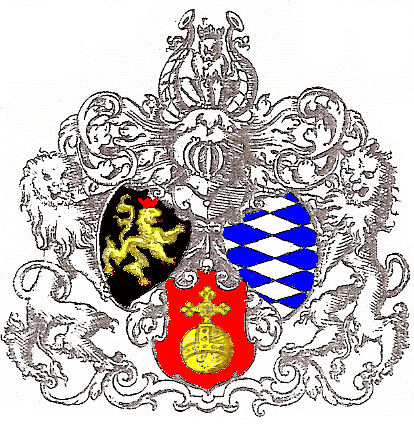
Greater coat of arms from 1703
Flags

1329–1776
Heraldic flag of the Palatinate

The variant used by the Wittelsbachs who inherited the Palatinate in the mid-14th century

1604 design

The colors of the country (Landesfarben) ensign (alternate flag)

1776–1789
(merged with Bavaria)

== Legacy ==
Coat of arms of Rhineland-Palatinate

In 1806, Baden was raised to a grand duchy and parts of the former Palatinate including Mannheim became part of it. At the Congress of Vienna in 1814 and 1815, southern parts of the left-bank Palatinate were restored and enlarged by mediatization (consuming the former Prince-Bishopric of Speyer, the Free Imperial City of Speyer, and others) up to the new border with France, and given (temporarily) to the Habsburg Austrian Empire; after this time, it was this new region that was principally known as "the Palatinate". The right-bank Palatinate remained with Baden while northern parts became part of Prussia (Rhine Province) and Hesse (Rhenish Hesse).

In 1816, the Palatinate became a formal part of the Wittelsbach Kingdom of Bavaria (the Rheinkreis or Circle of the Rhine) in a prearranged exchange for Tyrol, which Bavaria returned to Austria. Most of the area remained a part of Bavaria until after the Second World War (after 1918 the Free State of Bavaria), with some western parts becoming part of the Territory of the Saar Basin after World War I.

In September 1946 the territory was made part of the federal state of Rhineland-Palatinate, along with former left bank territories of Prussia (southern part of the Rhine Province, including the former Principality of Birkenfeld which had been an exclave of Oldenburg until 1937, and western parts of the Province of Nassau) and Rhenish Hesse. The former Territory of the Saar Basin was reinstated and expanded to create the French Saar Protectorate, which returned to Germany in 1956 as the modern state of Saarland.

== See also ==
- Count palatine
- German Palatines
- List of Counts Palatine of the Rhine

== Sources ==
- Beiler, Rosalind (2008). Immigrant and Entrepreneur: The Atlantic World of Caspar Wistar, 1650–1750. The Pennsylvania State University Press. pp. 60–61. ISBN 978-0-271-03595-6.
- Dosquet, Emilie (2016). "The Desolation of the Palatinate as a European News Event in News Networks in Early Modern Europe". News Networks in Early Modern Europe. Brill: 643–644. ISBN 978-90-04-27717-5. JSTOR 10.1163/j.ctt1w8h1ng.35.
- Jackson, Clare (2021). Devil Land; England under Siege 1588 - 1688. Allen Lane. ISBN 978-0241285817.
- Lindsay, J. O. (1957). The New Cambridge Modern History. Vol. 7, The Old Regime, 1713–1763 (New ed.). Cambridge University Press. p. 420. OL 25552836M.
- Lynn, John (1999). The Wars of Louis XIV, 1667–1714. Longman. ISBN 978-0-582-05629-9.
- Nicholls, David (1999). Napoleon: A Biographical Companion. ABC-CLIO. p. 18. ISBN 978-0-87436-957-1.
- Wilson, Peter H. (2009). Europe's Tragedy: A History of the Thirty Years War. Allen Lane. ISBN 978-0-7139-9592-3.
