= Agnes of Hohenstaufen =

Countess Palatine of the Rhine (1176–1204)

- Countess of the Palatinate
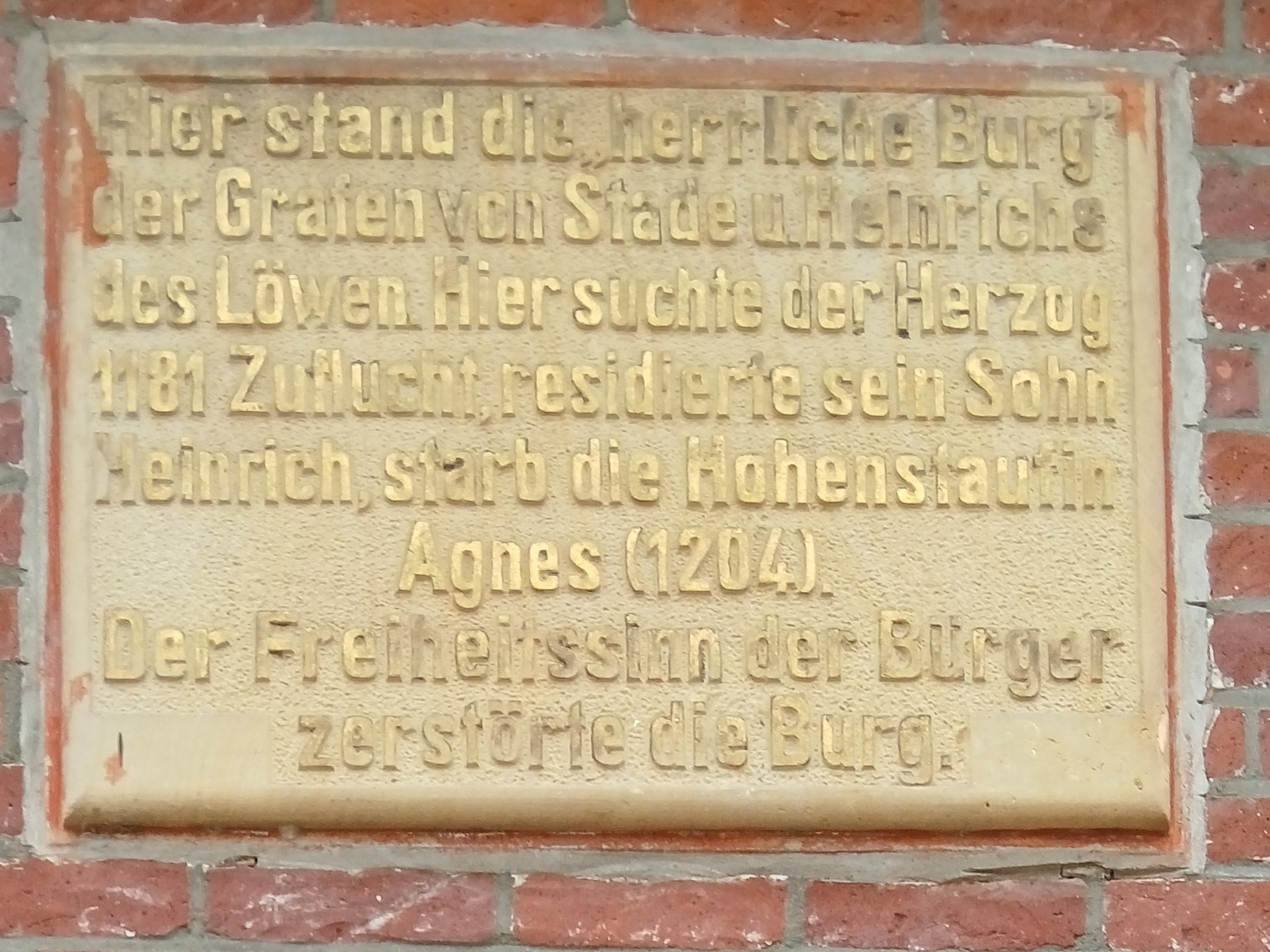
- Born: c. 1176
- Died: 7 or 9 May 1204; Stade, Saxony
- Noble family: Hohenstaufen
- Spouse: Henry V, Count Palatine of the Rhine
- Issue: Henry VI; Irmengard; Agnes
- Father: Conrad, Count Palatine of the Rhine
- Mother: Irmingard of Henneberg

Agnes of Hohenstaufen (1176 – 7 or 9 May 1204) was the daughter and heiress of the Hohenstaufen count palatine Conrad of the Rhine. She was Countess of the Palatinate herself from 1195 until her death, as the wife of the Welf count palatine Henry V.

== Life ==
Agnes's father Conrad of Hohenstaufen was a younger half-brother of Emperor Frederick Barbarossa, who had enfeoffed him with the Electoral Palatinate in 1156. A cautious and thoughtful politician, he aimed for peace and reconciliation in the Empire. Even before 1180, he had betrothed his daughter to Henry V, the eldest son of the rebellious Saxon duke Henry the Lion, in order to defuse the re-emerging conflict between the Hohenstaufen and Welf dynasties.

In 1193, however, Barbarossa's son and successor, Emperor Henry VI, wanted to create a political alliance with King Philip II of France and planned to marry his cousin Agnes to Philip II. When the young Welf scion Henry V heard of this plan, he contacted Agnes's parents. Her father avoided definitive statements on her betrothal, as he preferred a marriage with the French king, but also did not want to offend Henry V, whom Agnes revered fanatically.

Agnes's mother Irmengard (d. 1197), daughter of Count Berthold I of Henneberg, continued to advocate her daughter's marriage with the Welf prince. A little later she took advantage of the absence of her husband, who stayed at Henry VI's court, to thwart the Emperor's plan. She invited the young Welf to Stahleck Castle, where he and Agnes were married in January or February 1194.

Furious Emperor Henry VI felt betrayed and demanded that Conrad immediately annul the marriage. Conrad, however, dropped his initial resistance to the marriage and, seeing as it had already been blessed in Church, chose to convince his nephew Henry VI of the domestic political benefits of this marriage. Conrad's sons had died young and Henry VI could assure the succession in the Electoral Palatinate by enfeoffing Henry the Welf. Additionally, Conrad and Agnes on the occasion of the marital union convinced the emperor to pardon Henry the Lion, who had been deposed and outlawed by Frederick Barbarossa in 1180.

The reconciliation between Emperor Henry VI and Duke Henry the Lion was solemnly held in March 1194 at the Imperial Palace of Tilleda. Agnes and her husband Henry V had done their bit to prepare for this major domestic event with their unscheduled marriage at Stahleck Castle. Moreover, Emperor Henry VI had to settle the conflict with the House of Welf, to ensure peace in the Holy Roman Empire while enforcing his claims on the Kingdom of Sicily after the death of King Tancred on 20 February 1194.

== Issue ==
Agnes and Henry had a son and two daughters:

- Henry, was Count Palatine of the Rhine from 1212 to 1214
- Irmengard (1200–1260), married Herman V, Margrave of Baden-Baden
- Agnes (1201–1267), married Duke Otto II of Bavaria. Agnes and Otto became the ancestors of the House of Wittelsbach in Bavaria and the Palatinate. Her daughter Elisabeth was the mother of Conradin. Her son Louis was the father of Emperor Louis IV.

== Legacy ==
During the Romanticism period in the 19th century, the historic picture of Agnes of Hohenstaufen was blissfully idealised. In Christian Dietrich Grabbe's drama entitled Henry VI, published in 1830, she is depicted as a carefree but resolute girl, who even addresses the Imperial Diet to assert her marriage with the man she loves. Fighting for the love and happiness of her reluctant fiancé, she brings about the ultimate reconciliation of the Welf and Hohenstaufen families on the deathbed of her father-in-law, Henry the Lion, who called her "a rose blossoming between to rocks". In fact, it was Agnes's mother Irmengard who had arranged the marriage.

The opera Agnes von Hohenstaufen by the Italian composer Gaspare Spontini, based on the libretto by Ernst Raupach, had its premiere on 12 June 1829 at the Royal Opera Berlin.
