= Agnes of the Palatinate =

Duchess consort of Bavaria

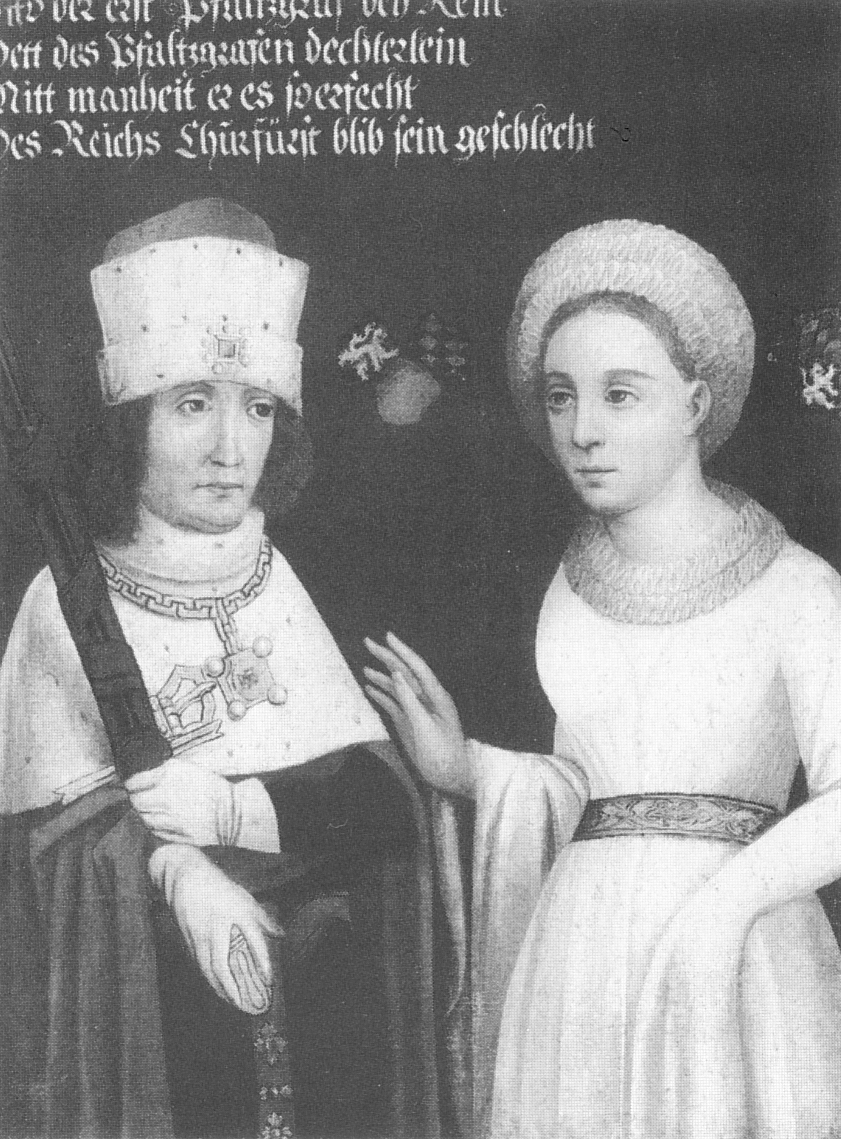
- Agnes with her husband Otto II Wittelsbach, Duke of Bavaria
- Born: 1201
- Died: 1267 (aged 65–66)
- Noble family: House of Guelph
- Spouse: Otto II Wittelsbach, Duke of Bavaria
- Issue: Louis II, Duke of Bavaria; Henry XIII, Duke of Bavaria; Elizabeth of Bavaria
- Father: Henry V, Count Palatine of the Rhine
- Mother: Agnes of Hohenstaufen

Agnes of the Palatinate (1201–1267) was a daughter of Henry V, Count Palatine of the Rhine, of the House of Welf, by his first wife Agnes of Hohenstaufen, daughter and heiress of Conrad of Hohenstaufen, Count Palatine of the Rhine. She married Otto II Wittelsbach, Duke of Bavaria.

== Family ==
Agnes was the youngest of three children born to her father by both of his marriages. Her father's second wife, also called Agnes, was the daughter of Conrad II, Margrave of Lusatia. Agnes' older sister was Irmgard, wife of Herman V, Margrave of Baden-Baden and her brother was Henry VI, Count Palatine of the Rhine.

== Marriage ==
Agnes married Otto II at Worms when he came of age in 1222. With this marriage, the Wittelsbach family inherited Palatinate and kept it as a Wittelsbach possession until 1918. Since that time also the lion has become a heraldic symbol in the coat-of-arms for Bavaria and the Palatinate.

In 1231 upon the death of Otto's father, Louis I, Duke of Bavaria, Otto and Agnes became Duke and Duchess of Bavaria.

After a dispute with Emperor Frederick II was ended, Otto joined the Hohenstaufen party in 1241. Their daughter, Elizabeth, was married to Frederick's son Conrad IV. Because of this, Otto was excommunicated by the pope.

Within thirty-one years of marriage, the couple had:

1. Louis II, Duke of Bavaria (13 April 1229, Heidelberg – 2 February 1294, Heidelberg)
2. Henry XIII, Duke of Bavaria (19 November 1235, Landshut – 3 February 1290, Burghausen)
3. Elisabeth of Bavaria, Queen of Germany (c. 1227, Landshut – 9 October 1273), married to:
  1. 1246 in Vohburg to Conrad IV of Germany;
  2. 1259 in Munich to Count Meinhard II of Gorizia-Tyrol, Duke of Carinthia.
4. Sophie (1236, Landshut – 9 August 1289, Castle Hirschberg), married 1258 to Count Gerhard IV of Sulzbach and Hirschberg.
5. Agnes (c. 1240 – c. 1306), a nun

Otto died 29 November 1253. Agnes died fourteen years later in 1267. She is buried at Scheyern.

== Ancestry ==
Ancestors of Agnes of the Palatinate

16. Henry IX, Duke of Bavaria
8. Henry X, Duke of Bavaria
17. Wulfhilde of Saxony
4. Henry the Lion
18. Lothair III, Holy Roman Emperor
9. Gertrude of Süpplingenburg
19. Richenza of Northeim
2. Henry V, Count Palatine of the Rhine
20. Geoffrey Plantagenet, Count of Anjou
10. Henry II of England
21. Matilda of the English
5. Matilda of England
22. William X, Duke of Aquitaine
11. Eleanor of Aquitaine
23. Aenor de Châtellerault
1. Agnes of the Palatinate
24. Frederick I, Duke of Swabia
12. Frederick II, Duke of Swabia
25. Agnes of Germany
6. Conrad, Count Palatine of the Rhine
26. Frederick, Count of Saarbrücken
13. Agnes of Saarbrücken
27. Gisela (of Teckelenburg or Lorraine?)
3. Agnes of Hohenstaufen
28. Gotebold II, Count of Henneberg
14. Berthold I, Count of Henneberg
29. Liutgard von Hohenberg
7. Irmingard of Henneberg
30. Frederick IV of Putelendorf, Count Palatine of Saxony
15. Bertha of Putelendorf
31. Agnes van Limburg

== Sources ==
- Bumke, Joachim (1991). Courtly Culture: Literature and Society in the High Middle Ages. Translated by Dunlap, Thomas. University of California Press.
- Jeffery, Renée (2018). Princess Elisabeth of Bohemia: The Philosopher Princess. Lexington Books.i

Agnes of the Palatinate House of Guelph Born: 1201 Died: 1267
Preceded by Ludmilla of Bohemia	Duchess of Bavaria; 1231–1253	Succeeded by Elisabeth of Hungary (Lower); Marie of Brabant (Upper)
