= Conrad of Hohenstaufen =

Conrad of Hohenstaufen may refer to:

- Conrad III of Germany (died 1152)
- Conrad, Count Palatine of the Rhine (died 1195)
- Conrad II, Duke of Swabia (died 1196)
- Conrad IV of Germany (died 1254)
- Conradin (died 1268)
