= Bertha of Putelendorf =

Bertha von Putelendorf (died after 1182) may have been the daughter of Count Palatine Friedrich IV von Putelendorf in Saxony and his wife Agnes of Limburg, daughter of Henry, Duke of Lower Lorraine. According to a secondary source, she was the daughter of the Count Palatine of Saxony. If this were true, from a chronological standpoint, her father would most likely be Friedrich IV von Putelendorf in Saxony. A woman named Bertha, possibly Bertha von Putelendorf, is recorded as the mother of Poppo VI, Count of Henneberg, as well as Irmgard and Liutgarde.

She married Berthold I, Count of Henneberg (died 1159?), and had three surviving children:

- Poppo VI, Count of Henneberg (a son, died 14 June 1190)
- Irmgard of Henneberg (a daughter, died 15 July 1197)
- Liutgarde of Henneberg (a daughter, died 22 November 1220), married Adalbert von Sommerschenberg

Bertha was also the grandmother of Agnes of Hohenstaufen through her daughter Irmgard von Henneberg.
