= Hermann von Stahleck =

German aristocrat (died 1156)

Hermann von Stahleck (died 2 October 1156) was the son of Count Goswin von Stahleck and Luitgard von Heimbach. He was Count Palatine of the Rhine from 1142/43 until his death.

Hermann inherited property from his father in eastern Franconia with the title of Count of Bildhausen (today a district of Münnerstadt) as well as in Höchstadt. His mother's inheritance probably included properties around Stahleck Castle. Although he was already appears powerful and influential as the sole heir to his father's numerous castles and estates, his reputation and lands were to be significantly increased by his marriage to Gertrud von Staufen, a sister of King Conrad and Frederick II of Swabia.

In 1142/1143 he was made Count Palatine of the Rhine by his brother-in-law king Conrad III, after the previous holder of that title, Henry II Jasomirgott had taken over the Margraviate of Austria. Hermann was also made vogt of the Archbishopric of Trier shortly afterwards. Hermann maintained his title against the claims of relatives of Henry's predecessors, in particular Otto I, Count of Salm and his son Otto II. According to one source, he had Otto II strangled at Schönburg in 1149. Otto I died the following year, and Hermann destroyed his castle at Rheineck on Conrad’s orders.

From 1147 to 1148 Hermann took part in the Wendish Crusade.

Disputes with the Archbishops of Mainz resulted in him being excommunicated twice. In 1155, Frederick Barbarossa sentenced his uncle to a degrading punishment, de:the carrying a dog, for breach of the peace, but this does not seem to have put a strain on their relationship, as Hermann remained close to Frederick until his death.

Shortly before his death in 1156, he founded Bildhausen Abbey which was however not settled until two years later by Cistercians from Ebrach Abbey. Hermann was initially buried in Ebrach Abbey and, after its completion, reburied in the monastery church of the Bildhausen Abbey.

After Hermann's death, Frederick Barbarossa passed the County Palatine to his half-brother Conrad von Hohenstaufen.
