= Irmingard of Henneberg =

Irmingard of Henneberg was the daughter of Berthold I of Henneberg and Bertha of Putelendorf. She was born between 1134 and 1136. She was the older sister of Poppo VI von Henneberg (1140–1191), Lukardis von Henneberg (1142–1220), and Otto IV Count of Henneberg (1144–1212).

== Marriage and issue ==
Irmingard married Conrad, Count Palatine of the Rhine on 1160. She and Conrad had the following children.

- Agnes of Hohenstaufen, 1176-1204; married Henry V, Count Palatine of the Rhine
- Friedrich, stillborn son

== Death ==
Irmingard died of unknown causes in 1197 at the age of 61-63. Her burial place is unknown.
