= Henry V, Count Palatine of the Rhine =

German noble (c. 1173–1227)

Henry V
- Count Palatine of the Rhine
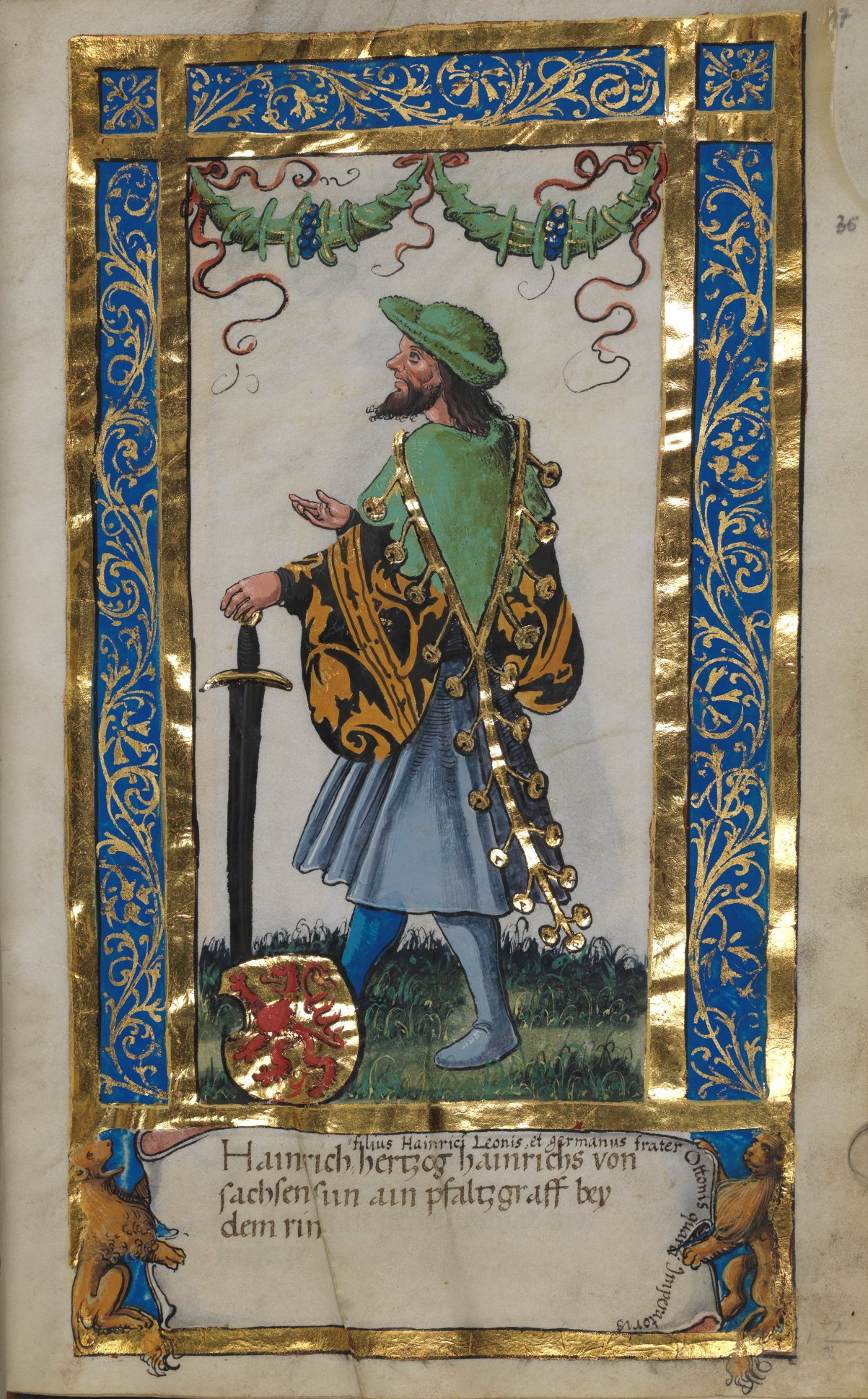
- Henry in the Weingarten Stifterbüchlein, c. 1510
- Reign: 1195–1212
- Born: c. 1173
- Died: c. 1227; Braunschweig, Saxony
- Buried: Brunswick Cathedral
- Noble family: Guelph
- Spouses: Agnes of Hohenstaufen (m. 1193; died 1204) Agnes of Landsberg (m. 1209)
- Issue: Henry VI, Count Palatine of the Rhine; Irmengard, Margravine of Baden; Agnes, Duchess of Bavaria
- Father: Henry the Lion
- Mother: Matilda of England

Henry V, the Elder of Brunswick (German: Heinrich der Ältere von Braunschweig; c. 1173 – c. 1227), a member of the House of Welf, was Count Palatine of the Rhine from 1195 until 1212.

== Life ==
Henry was the eldest son of Henry the Lion, Duke of Saxony and Bavaria and Matilda, the eldest daughter of King Henry II of England and Eleanor of Aquitaine.

After his father's deposition by his first-cousin the Hohenstaufen emperor Frederick Barbarossa, he grew up in England. When the family returned to Germany in 1189, young Henry distinguished himself by defending the Welf residence of Braunschweig against the forces of the emperor's son King Henry VI. Peace was established the next year, provided that Henry and his younger brother Lothar (d. 1190) were held in hostage by the king. He had to join the German forces led by Henry VI, by then emperor, on the 1191 campaign to the Kingdom of Sicily and participated in the siege of Naples. Taking advantage of the Emperor falling ill, Henry finally deserted, fled to Marseille, and returned to Germany, where he falsely proclaimed Henry VI's death and tried to underline his own abilities as a possible successor. This partly led to the withdrawal of Henry VI and the captivity of Empress Constance.

Though he was banned, he became heir to the County Palatine of the Rhine through his 1193 marriage to Agnes of Hohenstaufen, a cousin of Emperor Henry VI and daughter of Conrad of Hohenstaufen, Count Palatine of the Rhine, the younger half-brother of the late Emperor Frederick Barbarossa. He and Emperor Henry VI reconciled shortly afterwards, and upon Conrad's death in 1195, Henry was enfeoffed with his County Palatine. A close ally of the emperor, he accompanied him on the conquest of Sicily in 1194/95 and on the Crusade of 1197.

After the sudden death of the emperor in 1197, Henry's younger brother Otto IV became one of two rival kings of the Holy Roman Empire. At first he supported him, but switched sides to Philip of Swabia in 1203. Having divided the Welf allodial lands with his brothers Otto and William of Winchester, Henry then ruled over the northern Saxon territories around Stade and Altencelle and also was confirmed as count palatine by King Philip. When the German throne quarrel ended with Philip's assassination in 1208, Henry again sided with Otto IV. In Imperial service, he tried to ward off the territorial claims by the Rhenish Prince-archbishops of Cologne, Trier and Mainz, though to no avail.

After he inherited further significant properties in Saxony from his brother William in 1213, Henry ceded the Palatinate to his son Henry the Younger and moved north. After his son's early death the next year, he left his Welf properties to his nephew, William's son Otto the Child, who became the first Duke of Brunswick-Lüneburg in 1235. Henry died in 1227 and is entombed in Brunswick Cathedral.

== Marriage and children ==
In 1193, Henry married Agnes of Hohenstaufen (1177–1204), daughter of Count Palatine Conrad. They had the following children:

- Henry VI (1197–1214), married Matilda, daughter of Duke Henry I of Brabant
- Irmengard (1200–1260), married Margrave Herman V of Baden
- Agnes (1201–1267), married Otto II of Wittelsbach, Count palatine of the Rhine from 1214, Duke of Bavaria from 1231.

Around 1209, he married Agnes of Landsberg (d. 1248), daughter of the Wettin margrave Conrad II of Lusatia.

== Ancestors ==
Ancestors of Henry V, Count Palatine of the Rhine

8. Henry IX, Duke of Bavaria
4. Henry X, Duke of Bavaria
9. Wulfhilde of Saxony
2. Henry the Lion
10. Lothair II, Holy Roman Emperor
5. Gertrude of Süpplingenburg
11. Richenza of Northeim
1. Henry V, Count Palatine of the Rhine
12. Geoffrey V, Count of Anjou
6. Henry II of England
13. Matilda of England
3. Matilda of England
14. William X, Duke of Aquitaine
7. Eleanor of Aquitaine
15. Aenor de Châtellerault

== Sources ==
- Lyon, Jonathan R. (2013). Princely Brothers and Sisters: The Sibling Bond in German Politics, 1100-1250. Cornell University Press.
- Nicholson, Helen (2001). Love, War, and the Grail. Brill.
- Schutz, Herbert (2010). The Medieval Empire in Central Europe: Dynastic Continuity in the Post-Carolingian Frankish Realm, 900-1300. Cambridge Scholars Publishing.

Henry V, Count Palatine of the Rhine House of Welf Born: ? 1173 Died: 28 April 1227
German nobility
Preceded by Conrad	Count Palatine of the Rhine; 1195–1213	Succeeded by Henry VI
