= Henry VI, Count Palatine of the Rhine =

German noble

Henry VI "the Younger" of Brunswick (c. 1196 – 16 or 26 April 1214), of the House of Welf, was Count Palatine of the Rhine from 1212 to 1214.

Henry was born around 1196, the only son of Count Palatine Henry V and Agnes, daughter of Conrad, Count Palatine of the Rhine. In 1212 he was married to Mathilde of Brabant (died 1267), daughter of Henry I, Duke of Lower Lorraine and Brabant.

Henry was raised at the court of his granduncle, King John of England, and returned to Germany in 1211/1212. On political grounds, Henry's father abdicated the Palatine dignity in his favor in 1212.

At the court assembly in November 1212 in Aachen, Henry took the side of his uncle Otto IV, Holy Roman Emperor. He was presumably engaged to Mathilde of Brabant about the same time. Shortly thereafter he took sides against the party of Otto IV on behalf of Frederick II.

Henry died childless on the 16th or 26 April 1214. He was buried in Schönau Abbey near Heidelberg. He was succeeded as Count Palatine by the Duke Louis I of Bavaria, father of his brother-in-law Otto of Bavaria.

Henry VI, Count Palatine of the Rhine House of Welf Born: ? 1196 Died: April 1214
German nobility
Preceded by Henry V	Count Palatine of the Rhine; 1212–1214	Succeeded by Louis I
