= Conrad, Count Palatine of the Rhine =

First hereditary Count Palatine of the Rhine

Conrad of Hohenstaufen
- Born: c. 1135
- Died: 8 November 1195
- Noble family: House of Hohenstaufen
- Spouses: A daughter of Gottfried I of Sponheim; Irmengard of Henneberg
- Issue: 4, including: Agnes of Hohenstaufen
- Father: Frederick II of Swabia
- Mother: Agnes of Saarbrücken

Conrad of Hohenstaufen (c. 1135 – 8 November 1195) was the first hereditary Count Palatine of the Rhine.

His parents were Frederick II of Swabia (1090–1147), Duke of Swabia, and his second wife Agnes of Saarbrücken, daughter of Frederick, Count of Saarbrücken. Young Conrad, the only half-brother of Frederick Barbarossa, received the family's possessions around Franconia and Rhineland, particularly those of his mother's ancestry.

In 1156 on the occasion of the Reichstag at Worms, Emperor Frederick Barbarossa conferred upon his half-brother the dignity of Pfalzgraf (Count Palatine, of the Rhine), as well as the Vogtei of Schönau Abbey and of the chapter of Worms Cathedral, besides the Staufen family estates in the regions of Speyer and Worms. From about 1160 Conrad was married to Irmengard of Henneberg (d. 1197) as his second wife, daughter of Count Bertold I of Henneberg, Burggraf of Würzburg. This brought him the possession of the Vogtei of Lorsch Abbey. His endeavours to extend his area of influence brought him into conflict with the Bishops of Trier and Cologne.

Conrad and both his wives were buried in Schönau Abbey near Heidelberg. His two sons did not survive to continue the family. His inheritance passed to his daughter Agnes and her husband Henry V, of the House of Brunswick. (Their heiress would, in turn, pass the inheritance to the Wittelsbach dynasty who thereby became the well-known lords of the Palatinate and Electors Palatine.)

== Personal life ==
Conrad married firstly a daughter, whose name is not known, of Count Gottfried I of Sponheim, who probably died in 1159 or 1160 and was buried in Schönau Abbey. They had:

- Gottfried of Staufen (died probably in 1187 or 1188)

He married secondly Irmengard of Henneberg (c. 1135-1197), by whom he had three children:

- Frederick (died 3 September before 1189)
- Conrad (died probably in 1186), buried in Schönau Abbey
- Agnes (died 9 May 1204), buried in St. Marien in Stade; married late 1193 at Burg Stahleck Henry V, Duke of Brunswick (died 28 April 1227), Count Palatine of the Rhine from 1195 to 1212

== Sources ==
- Loud, Graham A.; Schenk, Jochen, eds. (2017). The Origins of the German Principalities, 1100–1350: Essays by German Historians. Routledge.

Conrad, Count Palatine of the Rhine House of Hohenstaufen Born: c. 1135 Died: 8 November 1195
German royalty
Regnal titles
Preceded by Hermann III of Stahleck	Count Palatine of the Rhine; 1156–1195	Succeeded by Henry V of Brunswick
