= List of counts palatine of the Rhine =

Counts Palatine of the Rhine, Counts Palatine of Lotharingia, and Elector Palatines

This article lists counts palatine of Lotharingia, counts palatine of the Rhine, and electors of the Palatinate (German: Kurfürst von der Pfalz), the titles of three counts palatine who ruled some part of the Rhine region in the Kingdom of Germany and the Holy Roman Empire between 915 and 1803. From 1261 (formally 1356), the title holder was a member of the small group of prince-electors who elected the emperor of the Holy Roman Empire. Since then, the title has also been referred to as "Elector Palatine".

== Counts palatine of Lotharingia, 915–1085 ==
The Palatinate emerged from the County Palatine of Lotharingia which came into existence in the 10th century.

- Wigeric of Lotharingia, count of the Bidgau (c. 915/916–922)
- Godfrey, count of the Jülichgau (c. 940)

=== House of Ezzo ===
During the 11th century, the Palatinate was dominated by the Ezzonian dynasty, which governed several counties on both banks of the Rhine. These territories were centered around Cologne-Bonn, but extended south to the rivers Moselle and Nahe. The southernmost point was near Alzey.

- Hermann I of Lotharingia 945–996
- Ezzo of Lotharingia 996–1034
- Otto I of Lotharingia 1034–1045 (Duke of Swabia 1045–1047)
- Henry I of Lotharingia 1045–1060/1061
- Hermann II of Lotharingia 1061/1064–1085 (in tutelage to Anno II, archbishop of Cologne until 1064)

== Counts palatine of the Rhine, 1085–1214 ==
From c.1085, after the death of the last Ezzonian count palatine, Herman II of Lotharingia, the Palatinate lost its military importance in Lotharingia. The territorial authority of the count palatine was reduced to his counties along the Rhine, henceforth called the County Palatine of the Rhine.

- Heinrich II of Laach 1085–95
- Siegfried of Ballenstedt 1095–1113
- Gottfried von Calw 1113–29
- William of Ballenstedt 1129–39
- Henry IV Jasomirgott 1139–42
- Hermann III of Stahleck 1142–55

=== Hohenstaufen counts palatine ===
The first hereditary count palatine of the Rhine was Conrad of Hohenstaufen, who was the younger brother of Emperor Frederick Barbarossa. The territories attached to this hereditary office began with those held by the Hohenstaufens in Franconia and Rhineland. (Other branches of the Hohenstaufen dynasty received territories including lands in Swabia and Franche-Comté). Part of this land derived from their imperial ancestors, the Salian Emperors, and part from Conrad's maternal ancestors, the Saarbrücken. This explains the composition of the inheritance that comprised the Upper and Rhenish Palatinate in the following centuries.

- Conrad of Hohenstaufen 1156–95

=== Welf counts palatine ===
In 1195, the Palatinate passed to the House of Welf through the marriage of Agnes, heir to the Staufen count.

- Henry V of Welf 1195–1213
- Henry VI of Welf 1213–14

== The Palatinate under the Wittelsbach: the Electoral dignity (1214–1803) ==
On the marriage of the Welf heiress Agnes in the early 13th century, the territory passed to the Wittelsbach dukes of Bavaria, who were also counts palatine of Bavaria. During a later division of territory among the heirs of Duke Louis II of Upper Bavaria in 1294, the elder branch of the Wittelsbachs came into possession of both the Rhenish Palatinate and the territories in Bavaria north of the Danube river (the Nordgau) centred around the town of Amberg. As this region was politically connected to the Rhenish Palatinate, the name Upper Palatinate (Oberpfalz) became common from the early 16th century, to contrast with the Lower Palatinate along the Rhine.

The Golden Bull of 1356, in circumvention of inner-Wittelsbach contracts and thus bypassing Bavaria, recognized the Palatinate as one of the secular electorates. The count was given the hereditary offices of Archsteward (Erztruchseß) of the Empire and Imperial Vicar (Reichsverweser) of Franconia, Swabia, the Rhine and southern Germany. From that time forth, the Count Palatine of the Rhine was usually known as the Elector Palatine (Kurfürst von der Pfalz). The position of prince-elector had existed earlier (for example, when two rival kings of Germany were elected in 1257: Richard of Cornwall and Alfonso X of Castile), though it is difficult to determine exactly the earliest date of the office.

By the early 16th century, owing to the practice of dividing territories among different branches of the family, junior lines of the Palatine Wittelsbachs came to rule in Simmern, Kaiserslautern and Zweibrücken in the Lower Palatinate, and in Neuburg and Sulzbach in the Upper Palatinate. The Elector Palatine, now based in Heidelberg, adopted Lutheranism in the 1530s and Calvinism in the 1550s.

=== House of Wittelsbach ===
==== Partitions of Palatinate under Wittelsbach rule ====
County Palatine of the Rhine (1214–1356)
Electoral Palatinate (Main line) (1356–1559)
| | Neumarkt (1410–1448) | Simmern (1st creation) (1410–1598); Simmern-Sponheim (1559–1598) |
| | Mosbach (1410–1490) | Simmern (1st creation) (1410–1598); Simmern-Sponheim (1559–1598) |
| | Mosbach (1410–1490) | | Zweibrücken (Main line) (1459–1661) |
| Neuburg (1st creation) (1505–1557) | | | Zweibrücken (Main line) (1459–1661) |
| Neuburg (1st creation) (1505–1557) | | | Veldenz (1543–1694) |
| Part of Zweibrücken | | | Veldenz (1543–1694) |
| Part of Zweibrücken | Electoral Palatinate (Simmern Line, 1st creation) (1559–1623) | | Veldenz (1543–1694) |
| Neuburg (2nd creation) (1569–1685) | Electoral Palatinate (Simmern Line, 1st creation) (1559–1623) | | Veldenz (1543–1694) | Zweibrücken -Vohenstrauss -Parkstein (1569–1597) | | | Zweibrücken -Birkenfeld (1569–1731) | | Sulzbach (1st creation) (1569–1604) |
| Neuburg (2nd creation) (1569–1685) | Electoral Palatinate (Simmern Line, 1st creation) (1559–1623) | | Veldenz (1543–1694) | Part of Neuburg (1597–1684) | | | Zweibrücken -Birkenfeld (1569–1731) | | Sulzbach (1st creation) (1569–1604) |
| Neuburg (2nd creation) (1569–1685) | | | Veldenz (1543–1694) | Part of Neuburg (1597–1684) | Landsberg (1604–1661) | Kleeburg (1604–1718) | Zweibrücken -Birkenfeld (1569–1731) | | Part of Neuburg |
| Neuburg (2nd creation) (1569–1685) | | Simmern (2nd creation) (1610–1674) | Veldenz (1543–1694) | Part of Neuburg (1597–1684) | Landsberg (1604–1661) | Kleeburg (1604–1718) | Zweibrücken -Birkenfeld (1569–1731) | | Part of Neuburg |
| Neuburg (2nd creation) (1569–1685) | | Simmern (2nd creation) (1610–1674) | Veldenz (1543–1694) | Part of Neuburg (1597–1684) | Landsberg (1604–1661) | Kleeburg (1604–1718) | Zweibrücken -Birkenfeld (1569–1731) | | Sulzbach (2nd creation) (1614–1742) |
| Neuburg (2nd creation) (1569–1685) | | Simmern (2nd creation) (1610–1674) | Veldenz (1543–1694) | Part of Neuburg (1597–1684) | Landsberg (1604–1661) | Kleeburg (1604–1718) | Zweibrücken -Birkenfeld -Bischweiler (1615–1671) | | Sulzbach (2nd creation) (1614–1742) |
| Neuburg (2nd creation) (1569–1685) | Part of the Electorate of Bavaria | Simmern (2nd creation) (1610–1674) | Veldenz (1543–1694) | Part of Neuburg (1597–1684) | Landsberg (1604–1661) | Kleeburg (1604–1718) | Zweibrücken -Birkenfeld -Bischweiler (1615–1671) | | Sulzbach (2nd creation) (1614–1742) |
| Neuburg (2nd creation) (1569–1685) | Electoral Palatinate (Simmern Line, 2nd creation) (1648–1685) | Simmern (2nd creation) (1610–1674) | Veldenz (1543–1694) | Part of Neuburg (1597–1684) | Landsberg (1604–1661) | Kleeburg (1604–1718) | Zweibrücken -Birkenfeld -Bischweiler (1615–1671) | | Sulzbach (2nd creation) (1614–1742) |
| Neuburg (2nd creation) (1569–1685) | Electoral Palatinate (Simmern Line, 2nd creation) (1648–1685) | Simmern (2nd creation) (1610–1674) | Veldenz (1543–1694) | Part of Neuburg (1597–1684) | Landsberg (1604–1661) | Kleeburg (1604–1718) | Zweibrücken -Birkenfeld -Bischweiler (1615–1671) | Zweibrücken -Birkenfeld -Gelnhausen (1654–1799) | Sulzbach (2nd creation) (1614–1742) |
| Neuburg (2nd creation) (1569–1685) | Electoral Palatinate (Simmern Line, 2nd creation) (1648–1685) | Simmern (2nd creation) (1610–1674) | Veldenz (1543–1694) | Part of Neuburg (1597–1684) | Zweibrücken (Landsberg Line) (1661–1677) | Kleeburg (1604–1718) | Zweibrücken -Birkenfeld -Bischweiler (1615–1671) | Zweibrücken -Birkenfeld -Gelnhausen (1654–1799) | Sulzbach (2nd creation) (1614–1742) |
| Neuburg (2nd creation) (1569–1685) | | | Veldenz (1543–1694) | Part of Neuburg (1597–1684) | Annexed to the Kingdom of France | Kleeburg (1604–1718) | | Zweibrücken -Birkenfeld -Gelnhausen (1654–1799) | Sulzbach (2nd creation) (1614–1742) |
| Electoral Palatinate (Neuburg Line) (1685–1742) | | | Veldenz (1543–1694) | Part of Electoral Palatinate (1685–1694) | Annexed to the Kingdom of France | Kleeburg (1604–1718) | | Zweibrücken -Birkenfeld -Gelnhausen (1654–1799) | Sulzbach (2nd creation) (1614–1742) |
| Electoral Palatinate (Neuburg Line) (1685–1742) | | | Veldenz (1543–1694) | Part of Electoral Palatinate (1685–1694) | Zweibrücken (Swedish Kleeburg Line, 1st creation) (1693–1718) | Kleeburg (1604–1718) | | Zweibrücken -Birkenfeld -Gelnhausen (1654–1799) | Sulzbach (2nd creation) (1614–1742) |
| | | | | | Zweibrücken (Kleeburg Line, 2nd creation) (1718–1731) | | | Zweibrücken -Birkenfeld -Gelnhausen (1654–1799) | Sulzbach (2nd creation) (1614–1742) |
| | | | | | Zweibrücken (Birkenfeld Line) (1731–1799) | | | Zweibrücken -Birkenfeld -Gelnhausen (1654–1799) | Sulzbach (2nd creation) (1614–1742) |
| Electoral Palatinate (Sulzbach Line) (1742–1799) | | | | | Zweibrücken (Birkenfeld Line) (1731–1799) | | | Zweibrücken -Birkenfeld -Gelnhausen (1654–1799) |
Electoral Palatinate (Zweibrücken Line) (1799–1803)

==== Table of rulers ====
| Ruler | Born | Reign | Death | Ruling part | Consort | Notes |
|---|---|---|---|---|---|---|
| Louis I the Kelheimer | 23 December 1173 | 1214–1231 | 15 September 1231 | County Palatine of the Rhine | Ludmilla of Bohemia; 1204 one child | Son of Otto I of Wittelsbach, Duke of Bavaria. Louis obtained the Palatinate of the Rhine in 1214. So Louis I served also as Count Palatine of the Rhine. He was assassinated 1231. |
| Otto II the Illustrious | 7 April 1206 | 1231–1253 | 29 November 1253 | County Palatine of the Rhine | Agnes of the Palatinate; 1222; Worms eleven children | Otto II served also as Count Palatine of the Rhine. On Otto II's death, Bavaria was divided between his sons. Louis received the Palatinate. |
| Louis II the Strict | 13 April 1229 | 1253–1294 | 2 February 1294 | County Palatine of the Rhine | Maria of Brabant; 2 August 1254 (executed) no children Anna of Głogów; 1260 two children Matilda of Austria; 24 October 1273 four children | |
During a later division of territory among his heirs in 1294, the elder branch of the Wittelsbachs came into possession of both the Rhenish Palatinate and the territories in Bavaria north of the Danube river (the Nordgau) centred around the town of Amberg. As this region was politically connected to the Rhenish Palatinate, the name Upper Palatinate (Oberpfalz) became common from the early 16th century, to contrast with the Lower Palatinate along the Rhine.
| Rudolph I the Stammerer | 4 October 1274 | 1294–1317 | 12 August 1319 | County Palatine of the Rhine | Matilda of Nassau; 1 September 1294; Nuremberg six children | Ruled jointly. In 1317 Rudolph abdicated of his rights to his brother |
| Louis IV the Bavarian | 5 April 1282 | 1294–1329 | 11 October 1347 | County Palatine of the Rhine | Beatrice of Świdnica-Jawor; 14 October 1308 six children | Ruled jointly. In 1317 Rudolph abdicated of his rights to his brother |
In 1327, Louis IV, Duke of Bavaria occupied Palatinate, but was not recognized as Count Palatine, as he was defending the position of his younger nephews against the claimancy of his older nephew, Adolf, Count Palatine of the Rhine. Ten years later gave it to his nephews, sons of Rudolph. With the Treaty of Pavia in 1329, as Emperor, Louis made formal his donation, pushing back the claimant Count Adolf.
| Rudolph II the Blind | 8 August 1306 | 1329–1353 | 4 October 1353 | County Palatine of the Rhine | Anna of Carinthia-Tyrol; 1328 one child Margaret of Sicily; 1348 no children | Son of Rudolph I. |
The Golden Bull of 1356 confirmed the right to participate in the election of a Holy Roman Emperor to the Count Palatine, title that evolved to Elector Palatine. Left no descendants. He was succeeded by his cousin Robert, son of the pushed Count Adolf.
| Robert I the Red (Ruprecht I. der Rote) | 9 June 1309 | 1353–1356 | 16 February 1390 | County Palatine of the Rhine | Elisabeth of Namur; 1350 or 1358 no children Beatrix of Berg; 1385 no children | Son of Rudolph I and brother of Rudolph II. In January 1356 was recognized as the First Elector Palatine. |
| Robert I the Red (Ruprecht I. der Rote) | 9 June 1309 | 10 January 1356 – 16 February 1390 | 16 February 1390 | Electoral Palatinate | Elisabeth of Namur; 1350 or 1358 no children Beatrix of Berg; 1385 no children | Son of Rudolph I and brother of Rudolph II. In January 1356 was recognized as the First Elector Palatine. |
| Robert II the Hard (Ruprecht II. der Harte) | 12 May 1325 | 16 January 1390 – 6 January 1398 | 6 January 1398 | Electoral Palatinate | Beatrice of Sicily; 1345 seven children | Son of the claimant count Adolf. |
| Robert III the Righteous (Ruprecht III. der Gerechte) | 5 May 1352 | 6 January 1398 – 18 May 1410 | 18 May 1410 | Electoral Palatinate | Elisabeth of Nuremberg; 27 June 1374; Amberg seven children | Also King of Germany (1400–1410). |
| Louis III the Bearded (Ludwig III. der Bärtige) | 23 January 1378 | 18 May 1410 – 30 December 1436 | 30 December 1436 | Electoral Palatinate | Blanche of England; 6 July 1402; Cologne no children Matilda of Savoy; 30 November 1417 five children | Children of Robert III, divided the land. Louis kept the Electorate; Stephen received Simmern, John inherited Neumarkt and Otto received Mosbach. Stephen brought by marriage the County of Veldenz to his possessions, and, after his death, Zweibrücken split off from Simmern. |
| Stephen I | 23 June 1385 | 1410–1459 | 14 February 1459 | Palatinate-Simmern | Anna of Veldenz; 10 June 1410; Heidelberg eight children | Children of Robert III, divided the land. Louis kept the Electorate; Stephen received Simmern, John inherited Neumarkt and Otto received Mosbach. Stephen brought by marriage the County of Veldenz to his possessions, and, after his death, Zweibrücken split off from Simmern. |
| John I | 1383 | 1410–1443 | 14 March 1443 | Palatinate-Neumarkt | Catherine of Pomerania-Stolp; 15 August 1407; Ribe seven children | Children of Robert III, divided the land. Louis kept the Electorate; Stephen received Simmern, John inherited Neumarkt and Otto received Mosbach. Stephen brought by marriage the County of Veldenz to his possessions, and, after his death, Zweibrücken split off from Simmern. |
| Otto I | 24 August 1390 | 1410–1461 | 5 July 1461 | Palatinate-Mosbach | Joanna of Bavaria-Landshut; January 1430; Burghausen eight children | Children of Robert III, divided the land. Louis kept the Electorate; Stephen received Simmern, John inherited Neumarkt and Otto received Mosbach. Stephen brought by marriage the County of Veldenz to his possessions, and, after his death, Zweibrücken split off from Simmern. |
| Regency of Otto I, Count Palatine of Mosbach (1436–1442) | | | | | | |
| Louis IV the Meek (Ludwig IV. der Sanftmütige) | 1 January 1424 | 30 December 1436 – 13 August 1449 | 13 August 1449 | Electoral Palatinate | Margaret of Savoy; 18 October 1445; Heidelberg one child | |
| Christopher I | 26 February 1416 | 1443–1448 | 5/6 January 1448 | Palatinate-Neumarkt | Dorothea of Brandenburg; 12 September 1445; Copenhagen no children | Also King of the Kalmar Union (1440–1448), in Denmark, Sweden and Norway. Left no descendants. Neumarkt reverted to Palatinate-Mosbach. |
Neumarkt definitely annexed to Palatinate-Mosbach
| Frederick I the Victorious (Friedrich I. der Siegreiche) | 1 August 1425 | 13 August 1449 – 12 December 1476 | 12 December 1476 | Electoral Palatinate | Clara Tott; 1471/2 (morganatic) two children | Brother of his predecessor. Left no legitimate heirs to the Electorate. He was succeeded by his nephew. |
| Frederick I the Pious | 19 November 1417 | 1459–1480 | 29 November 1480 | Palatinate-Simmern | Margaret of Guelders; 6 August 1454; Lobith ten children | Children of Stephen, divided the land. |
| Louis I the Black | 1424 | 1459–1489 | 19 July 1489 | Palatinate-Zweibrücken | Johanna de Croÿ; 20 March 1454; Luxembourg twelve children | Children of Stephen, divided the land. |
| Otto II the Mathematician | 26 June 1435 | 1461–1490 | 8 April 1499 | Palatinate-Mosbach | Unmarried | Had a strong interest in astronomy and mathematics. Abdicated in 1490 to spend the remainder of his life in scientific pursuits. Mosbach reverted to the Electorate. |
Mosbach definitely annexed to the Electoral Palatinate
| Philip I the Upright (Philipp I. der Aufrichtige) | 14 July 1448 | 12 December 1476 – 28 February 1508 | 28 February 1508 | Electoral Palatinate | Margaret of Bavaria; 1474; Amberg fourteen children | |
| John I | 15 May 1459 | 1480–1509 | 27 January 1509 | Palatinate-Simmern | Joanna of Nassau-Saarbrücken; 29 September 1481 three children | |
| Alexander I the Lame | 26 November 1462 | 1489–1514 | 21 October 1514 | Palatinate-Zweibrücken | Margaret of Hohenlohe-Neuenstein; 1499; Zweibrücken six children | Sons of Louis the Black, ruled jointly. |
| Kaspar | 11 July 1459 | 1489–1490 | 1527 | Palatinate-Zweibrücken | Amalie of Brandenburg; 19 April 1478; Zweibrücken no children | Sons of Louis the Black, ruled jointly. |
| Louis V the Pacific (Ludwig V. der Friedfertige) | 2 July 1478 | 28 February 1508 – 16 March 1544 | 16 March 1544 | Electoral Palatinate | Sibylle of Bavaria; 23 February 1511; Heidelberg no children | Left no descendants. He was succeeded by his brother. |
| John II | 21 March 1492 | 1509–1557 | 18 May 1557 | Palatinate-Simmern | Beatrix of Baden; 22 May 1508 twelve children | He introduced the Reformation into Simmern which led to increased tensions with his neighbours, the Archbishoprics of Trier and Mainz. |
| Louis II the Younger | 14 September 1502 | 1514–1532 | 3 December 1532 | Palatinate-Zweibrücken | Elisabeth of Hesse; 10 September 1525; Kassel two children | |
| Robert I | 1506 | 1532–1544 | 28 July 1544 | Palatinate-Veldenz | Ursula of Salm-Kyrburg; 23 June 1537 three children | Divided the land. Robert was a younger brother of Louis II, and Wolfgang was Louis' son. Technically, Robert held both lands during Wolfgang's minority. |
| Regency of Robert, Count Palatine of Veldenz (1532–1543) | | | | | | Divided the land. Robert was a younger brother of Louis II, and Wolfgang was Louis' son. Technically, Robert held both lands during Wolfgang's minority. |
| Wolfgang | 26 September 1526 | 1532–1569 | 11 June 1569 | Palatinate-Zweibrücken | Anna of Hesse; 24 February 1544 thirteen children | Divided the land. Robert was a younger brother of Louis II, and Wolfgang was Louis' son. Technically, Robert held both lands during Wolfgang's minority. |
| Frederick II the Wise (Friedrich II. der Weise) | 9 December 1482 | 16 March 1544 – 26 December 1556 | 26 December 1556 | Electoral Palatinate | Dorothea of Denmark; 18 May 1535; Heidelberg no children | Left no descendants. He was succeeded by a cousin. |
Regencies of Ursula of Salm-Kyrburg (1544–1546) and Wolfgang, Count Palatine of Zweibrücken (1544–1560)
| George John I the Astute | 11 April 1543 | 1560–1592 | 18 April 1592 | Palatinate-Veldenz | Anna of Sweden; 20 December 1562 eleven children | |
| Regencies of Philip, Elector Palatine (1505–1508) and Frederick II, Elector Palatine (1508–1516) | | | | | | Children of Robert of Palatinate, bishop of Freising (and grandsons of Philip I). Their father married the heiress of Bavaria-Landshut, Elisabeth, was adopted by his father-in-law, and eventually became heir of Bavaria-Landshut. This new declaration led to the Landshut War. In the aftermath of the conflict, a part of Landshut joined Palatinate with the name of Palatinate-Neuburg. In 1557 Otto Henry abdicated of Neuburg to become Elector. Neuburg fell to Wolfgang I. Otto Henry left no descendants: the main line became extinct with his death. Simmern line succeeded in the Electorate. |
| Otto Henry the Magnanimous (Ottheinrich. der Großmütige) | 10 April 1502 | 1505–1557 | 12 February 1559 | Palatinate-Neuburg | Susanna of Bavaria; 16 October 1529; Neuburg an der Donau no children | |
| Otto Henry the Magnanimous (Ottheinrich. der Großmütige) | 10 April 1502 | 26 December 1556 – 12 February 1559 | 12 February 1559 | Electoral Palatinate | Susanna of Bavaria; 16 October 1529; Neuburg an der Donau no children | |
| Philip I the Warlike | 12 November 1503 | 1505–1541 | 4 July 1548 | Palatinate-Neuburg | Unmarried | |
Neuburg annexed to Zweibrücken
| Frederick III the Pious (Friedrich III. der Fromme) | 14 February 1515 | 1557–1559 | 26 October 1576 | Palatinate-Simmern | Marie of Brandenburg-Kulmbach; 21 October 1537; Kreuznach eleven children Amalia of Neuenahr; 25 April 1569; Heidelberg no children | When the senior branch of the family died out in 1559, the electorate passed to Frederick III of Simmern, son of John II and a staunch Calvinist. The Palatinate became one of the major centers of Calvinism in Europe, supporting Calvinist rebellions in both the Netherlands and France. |
| Frederick III the Pious (Friedrich III. der Fromme) | 14 February 1515 | 12 February 1559 – 26 October 1576 | 26 October 1576 | Electoral Palatinate | Marie of Brandenburg-Kulmbach; 21 October 1537; Kreuznach eleven children Amalia of Neuenahr; 25 April 1569; Heidelberg no children | When the senior branch of the family died out in 1559, the electorate passed to Frederick III of Simmern, son of John II and a staunch Calvinist. The Palatinate became one of the major centers of Calvinism in Europe, supporting Calvinist rebellions in both the Netherlands and France. |
| George | 20 February 1518 | 1559–1569 | 17 May 1569 | Palatinate-Simmern | Elisabeth of Hesse; 9 January 1541 one child | Son of John II. Left no descendants. He was succeeded by his brother. |
| Richard | 25 July 1521 | 1569–1598 | 13 January 1598 | Palatinate-Simmern | Julianna of Wied; 30 January 1569 four children Emilie of Württemberg; 26 March 1578 no children Anne Margaret of Palatinate-Veldenz; 14 December 1589 no children | Son of John II. Left no descendants. Simmern returned to the Electorate. |
Simmern briefly annexed to the Electoral Palatinate (1598–1610)
| Regency of Anna of Hesse, William IV, Landgrave of Hesse-Kassel and Louis VI, Elector Palatine (1569–1574) | | | | | | Children of Wolfgang, divided the land: John received Zweibrücken; Frederick received Vohenstrauss-Parkstein, which after his death with no descendants went to Neuburg; Otto Henry received Sulzbach, which after his death with no descendants went to Neuburg; Charles received Birkenfeld; Philip Louis (the eldest son) received Neuburg, and absorbed his childless brothers land after their deaths. |
| John I the Lame | 8 May 1550 | 1569–1604 | 12 August 1604 | Palatinate-Zweibrücken | Magdalene of Jülich-Cleves-Berg; 1579; Bad Bergzabern nine children | Children of Wolfgang, divided the land: John received Zweibrücken; Frederick received Vohenstrauss-Parkstein, which after his death with no descendants went to Neuburg; Otto Henry received Sulzbach, which after his death with no descendants went to Neuburg; Charles received Birkenfeld; Philip Louis (the eldest son) received Neuburg, and absorbed his childless brothers land after their deaths. |
| Philip Louis | 2 October 1547 | 1569–1614 | 22 August 1614 | Palatinate-Neuburg | Anna of Cleves; 27 September 1574; Neuburg an der Donau eight children | Children of Wolfgang, divided the land: John received Zweibrücken; Frederick received Vohenstrauss-Parkstein, which after his death with no descendants went to Neuburg; Otto Henry received Sulzbach, which after his death with no descendants went to Neuburg; Charles received Birkenfeld; Philip Louis (the eldest son) received Neuburg, and absorbed his childless brothers land after their deaths. |
| Frederick I | 11 April 1557 | 1569–1597 | 17 December 1597 | Palatinate-Zweibrücken-Vohenstrauss-Parkstein | Katharina Sophie of Legnica; 26 February 1587 three children | Children of Wolfgang, divided the land: John received Zweibrücken; Frederick received Vohenstrauss-Parkstein, which after his death with no descendants went to Neuburg; Otto Henry received Sulzbach, which after his death with no descendants went to Neuburg; Charles received Birkenfeld; Philip Louis (the eldest son) received Neuburg, and absorbed his childless brothers land after their deaths. |
| Otto Henry | 22 July 1567 | 1569–1604 | 29 August 1604 | Palatinate-Sulzbach | Dorothea Maria of Württemberg; 25 November 1582 thirteen children | Children of Wolfgang, divided the land: John received Zweibrücken; Frederick received Vohenstrauss-Parkstein, which after his death with no descendants went to Neuburg; Otto Henry received Sulzbach, which after his death with no descendants went to Neuburg; Charles received Birkenfeld; Philip Louis (the eldest son) received Neuburg, and absorbed his childless brothers land after their deaths. |
| Charles I | 4 September 1560 | 1569–1600 | 16 December 1600 | Palatinate-Zweibrücken-Birkenfeld | Dorothea of Brunswick-Lüneburg; 23 November 1590 four children | Children of Wolfgang, divided the land: John received Zweibrücken; Frederick received Vohenstrauss-Parkstein, which after his death with no descendants went to Neuburg; Otto Henry received Sulzbach, which after his death with no descendants went to Neuburg; Charles received Birkenfeld; Philip Louis (the eldest son) received Neuburg, and absorbed his childless brothers land after their deaths. |
Vohenstrauss-Parkstein annexed to Neuburg
Sulzbach annexed to Neuburg
| Louis VI the Careless (Ludwig VI. der Leichtsinnige) | 4 July 1539 | 26 October 1576 – 22 October 1583 | 22 October 1583 | Electoral Palatinate | Elisabeth of Hesse; 8 July 1560; Marburg twelve children Anne of Ostfriesland; 12 July 1583; Heidelberg no children | Children of Frederick III, divided the land: Louis received the Electorate, and John Casimir was given a portion at Lautern. The latter didn't have descendants, and his portion returned to the Electorate. |
| John Casimir | 7 March 1543 | 1576–1592 | 16 January 1592 | Palatinate-Simmern (at Lautern) | Elisabeth of Saxony; 4 June 1570; Heidelberg no children | Children of Frederick III, divided the land: Louis received the Electorate, and John Casimir was given a portion at Lautern. The latter didn't have descendants, and his portion returned to the Electorate. |
Lautern reabsorbed in the Electorate
| Regency of John Casimir, Count Palatine of Lautern (1583–1592) | | | | | | With his adviser Christian of Anhalt, he founded the Evangelical Union of Protestant states in 1608. |
| Frederick IV the Righteous (Friedrich IV. der Aufrichtige) | 5 March 1574 | 22 October 1583 – 19 September 1610 | 19 September 1610 | Electoral Palatinate | Louise Juliana of Orange-Nassau; 23 June 1593; Dillenburg eight children | With his adviser Christian of Anhalt, he founded the Evangelical Union of Protestant states in 1608. |
| Regency of Anna of Sweden (1592–1598) | | | | | | Children of George John I, ruled jointly. In 1598 divided the land: George Gustavus kept Veldenz; John Augustus received Lützelstein; and Louis Philip and George John received jointly received Gutenberg. In 1601 George John ruled alone Gutenberg. In 1611, after the death of John Augustus with no descendants, Lützelstein was annexed to Guttenberg. In 1654, after the death of George John without descendants, Guttenberg reverted to Veldens, united under Leopold Louis, George Gustavus' son. |
| George Gustavus | 6 February 1564 | 1598–1634 | 3 June 1634 | Palatinate-Veldenz | Elisabeth of Württemberg; 30 October 1586 no children Maria Elizabeth of Palatinate-Zweibrücken; 17 May 1601 eleven children | Children of George John I, ruled jointly. In 1598 divided the land: George Gustavus kept Veldenz; John Augustus received Lützelstein; and Louis Philip and George John received jointly received Gutenberg. In 1601 George John ruled alone Gutenberg. In 1611, after the death of John Augustus with no descendants, Lützelstein was annexed to Guttenberg. In 1654, after the death of George John without descendants, Guttenberg reverted to Veldens, united under Leopold Louis, George Gustavus' son. |
| John Augustus | 26 November 1575 | 1598–1611 | 18 September 1611 | Palatinate-Veldenz (at Lützelstein) | Anne Elizabeth of the Palatinate; 1599 no children | Children of George John I, ruled jointly. In 1598 divided the land: George Gustavus kept Veldenz; John Augustus received Lützelstein; and Louis Philip and George John received jointly received Gutenberg. In 1601 George John ruled alone Gutenberg. In 1611, after the death of John Augustus with no descendants, Lützelstein was annexed to Guttenberg. In 1654, after the death of George John without descendants, Guttenberg reverted to Veldens, united under Leopold Louis, George Gustavus' son. |
| Louis Philip I | 24 November 1577 | 1598–1601 | 24 October 1601 | Palatinate-Veldenz (at Gutenberg) | Unmarried | Children of George John I, ruled jointly. In 1598 divided the land: George Gustavus kept Veldenz; John Augustus received Lützelstein; and Louis Philip and George John received jointly received Gutenberg. In 1601 George John ruled alone Gutenberg. In 1611, after the death of John Augustus with no descendants, Lützelstein was annexed to Guttenberg. In 1654, after the death of George John without descendants, Guttenberg reverted to Veldens, united under Leopold Louis, George Gustavus' son. |
| George John II | 24 June 1586 | 1598–1654 | 29 September 1654 | Palatinate-Veldenz (at Gutenberg) | Susanna of Palatinate-Sulzbach; 20 December 1562 eleven children | Children of George John I, ruled jointly. In 1598 divided the land: George Gustavus kept Veldenz; John Augustus received Lützelstein; and Louis Philip and George John received jointly received Gutenberg. In 1601 George John ruled alone Gutenberg. In 1611, after the death of John Augustus with no descendants, Lützelstein was annexed to Guttenberg. In 1654, after the death of George John without descendants, Guttenberg reverted to Veldens, united under Leopold Louis, George Gustavus' son. |
| Regency of Philip Louis, Count Palatine of Neuburg (1600–1612) and John I, Count Palatine of Zweibrücken (1600–1604) | | | | | | Children of Charles I, divided the land. |
| George William | 6 August 1591 | 1608–1669 | 25 December 1669 | Palatinate-Zweibrücken-Birkenfeld | Dorothea of Solms-Sonnenwalde; 30 November 1616 six children Juliana of Salm-Grumbach; 30 November 1641 no children Anne Elizabeth of Öttingen-Öttingen; 8 March 1649 no children | Children of Charles I, divided the land. |
| Christian I | 3 November 1598 | 1615–1654 | 6 September 1654 | Palatinate-Birkenfeld-Bischweiler | Magdalene Catherine of Palatinate-Zweibrücken; 14 November 1630 nine children Maria Joanna of Helffenstein; 28 October 1648 one child | Children of Charles I, divided the land. |
| John II the Younger | 26 March 1584 | 1604–1635 | 9 August 1635 | Palatinate-Zweibrücken | Catherine de Rohan; 26 August 1604 one child Louise Juliana of the Palatinate; 13 May 1612 seven children | Children of John I, divided the land: John Kept Zweibrücken, Frederick Casimir received Landsberg and John Casimir inherited Kleeburg. |
| Frederick Casimir | 10 June 1585 | 1604–1645 | 30 September 1645 | Palatinate-Landsberg | Emilia Antwerpiana of Orange-Nassau; 4 July 1616; Landsberg three children | Children of John I, divided the land: John Kept Zweibrücken, Frederick Casimir received Landsberg and John Casimir inherited Kleeburg. |
| John Casimir | 20 April 1589 | 1604–1652 | 18 June 1652 | Palatinate-Kleeburg | Catherine of Sweden; 11 June 1615; Stockholm eight children | Children of John I, divided the land: John Kept Zweibrücken, Frederick Casimir received Landsberg and John Casimir inherited Kleeburg. |
| Frederick V the Winter King (Friedrich V. der Winterkönig) | 26 August 1596 | 19 September 1610 – 23 February 1623 | 29 November 1632 | Electoral Palatinate | Elizabeth of Great Britain; 14 February 1613; London thirteen children | In 1619, he accepted the throne of Bohemia from the Bohemian estates. He was defeated by the Emperor Ferdinand II at the Battle of White Mountain in 1620, and Spanish and Bavarian troops soon occupied the Palatinate itself. He was known as "the Winter King" because his reign in Bohemia only lasted one winter. In 1623, Frederick was put under the ban of the Empire. |
Frederick V's territories and his position as elector were transferred to the Duke of Bavaria, Maximilian I, of a distantly related branch of the House of Wittelsbach. Although technically Elector Palatine, he was known as the Elector of Bavaria. From 1648 he ruled in Bavaria and the Upper Palatinate alone, but retained all his electoral dignities and the seniority of the Palatinate Electorate. Electoral Palatinate briefly annexed to the Electorate of Bavaria (1623–1648)
| Louis Philip | 23 November 1602 | 1610–1655 | 6 January 1655 | Palatinate-Simmern | Marie Eleonore von Brandenburg; 4 December 1631 seven children | Son of Elector Frederick, restored Simmern. |
| Wolfgang William | 4 November 1578 | 1614–1653 | 14 September 1653 | Palatinate-Neuburg | Magdalene of Bavaria; 11 November 1613; Munich one child Catharina Charlotte of Palatinate-Zweibrücken; 11 November 1631; Blieskastel two children Maria Franziska of Fürstenberg-Heiligenberg; 3 June 1651 no children | Son of Philip Louis, inherited Neuburg. |
| Augustus | 2 October 1582 | 1614–1632 | 14 August 1632 | Palatinate-Sulzbach | Hedwig of Holstein-Gottorp; 17 July 1620 seven children | Sons of Philip Louis, inherited Sulzbach. John Frederick created Palatinate-Sulzbach-Hilpoltstein, but at his death with no surviving children, Sulzbach became reunited under Augustus' son, Christian August. |
| John Frederick | 23 August 1587 | 1614–1644 | 19 October 1644 | Palatinate-Sulzbach (at Hilpoltstein) | Sophie Agnes of Hesse-Darmstadt; 7/17 November 1624 eight children | Sons of Philip Louis, inherited Sulzbach. John Frederick created Palatinate-Sulzbach-Hilpoltstein, but at his death with no surviving children, Sulzbach became reunited under Augustus' son, Christian August. |
| Regency of John Frederick, Count Palatine of Sulzbach-Hilpoltstein (1632–1636) | | | | | | Reunited Sulzbach after John Frederick's death in 1644. |
| Christian Augustus | 26 July 1622 | 1632–1708 | 23 July 1708 | Palatinate-Sulzbach | Amalie of Nassau-Siegen; 27 March 1649 five children | Reunited Sulzbach after John Frederick's death in 1644. |
| Regency of George John II, Count Palatine of Lützelstein-Guttenberg (1634–1639) | | | | | | Reunited Palatinate-Veldenz in 1654. However, left no surviving male descendants. Veldenz went to the Electorate. |
| Leopold Louis | 1 February 1625 | 1634–1694 | 29 September 1694 | Palatinate-Veldenz | Agatha Christine of Hanau-Lichtenberg; 4 July 1648; Bischweiler twelve children | Reunited Palatinate-Veldenz in 1654. However, left no surviving male descendants. Veldenz went to the Electorate. |
Veldenz definitely annexed to the Electoral Palatinate
| Frederick I | 5 April 1619 | 1635–1661 | 9 July 1661 | Palatinate-Zweibrücken | Anna Juliane of Nassau-Saarbrücken; 6 April 1640 ten children | Left no male surviving descendants. Zweibrucken was inherited by Landsberg line. |
| Frederick Louis | 27 October 1619 | 1645–1661 | 11 April 1681 | Palatinate-Landsberg | Juliana Magdalena of Palatinate-Zweibrücken; 14 November 1645; Düsseldorf thirteen children Anna Marie Elisabeth Hepp; 21 August 1672 (morganatic) five children | Inherited Zweibrücken from his cousin Frederick in 1661, and annexed Landsberg to it. In 1677 the Kingdom of France occupied his duchies. He left no surviving descendants. |
| Frederick Louis | 27 October 1619 | 1661–1677 | 11 April 1681 | Palatinate-Zweibrücken | Juliana Magdalena of Palatinate-Zweibrücken; 14 November 1645; Düsseldorf thirteen children Anna Marie Elisabeth Hepp; 21 August 1672 (morganatic) five children | Inherited Zweibrücken from his cousin Frederick in 1661, and annexed Landsberg to it. In 1677 the Kingdom of France occupied his duchies. He left no surviving descendants. |
Palatinate-Landsberg was definitely reannexed to the Palatinate-Zweibrücken
Palatinate-Zweibrücken (with Landsberg) was briefly annexed to the Kingdom of France (1677–1693)
| Charles Louis (Karl I. Ludwig) | 22 December 1617 | 24 October 1648- 28 August 1680 | 28 August 1680 | Electoral Palatinate (Simmern line restored) | Charlotte of Hesse-Kassel; 22 February 1650; Kassel (unilateral divorce in 1658) three children Marie Luise von Degenfeld; 6 January 1658; Schwetzingen (morganatic and bigamous) thirteen children Elisabeth Hollander von Bernau; 11 December 1679; Vohenstrauß (morganatic) one child | Son of Frederick V. By the Peace of Westphalia in 1648, Charles Louis was restored to the Lower Palatinate and was given a new electoral title, also that of "Elector Palatine" but lower in precedence than the other electorates. |
| Charles Gustavus | 8 November 1622 | 1652–1654 | 13 February 1660 | Palatinate-Kleeburg | Hedwig Eleonora of Holstein-Gottorp; 24 October 1654; Stockholm one child | Abdicated from Kleeburg in 1654, to become King of Sweden (as Charles X), right hat he inherited from his mother. |
| John Charles | 17 October 1638 | 1654–1704 | 21 February 1704 | Palatinate-Birkenfeld-Gelnhausen | Sophie Amalie of Palatinate-Zweibrücken; 1685; Weikersheim one child Esther Maria von Witzleben; 28 July 1696 five children | Son of Christian I, received Gelnhausen. |
| Adolph John I | 21 October 1629 | 1654–1689 | 24 October 1689 | Palatinate-Kleeburg | Elsa Beata Brahe; 19 June 1649; Stockholm one child Elsa Elisabeth Brahe; 1661; Stockholm nine children | Brother of Charles Gustavus, received Kleeburg after the abdication of his brother. |
| Louis Henry | 11 October 1640 | 1655–1674 | 3 January 1674 | Palatinate-Simmern | Maria of Orange-Nassau; 23 September 1666; Kleve no children | Left no descendants. Simmern returned to the Electorate. |
Simmern definitely annexed to the Electoral Palatinate
| Charles Otto | 5 September 1625 | 1669–1671 | 30 March 1671 | Palatinate-Zweibrücken-Birkenfeld | Margaret Hedwig of Hohenlohe-Neuenstein; 26 September 1658 three children | Left no surviving descendants. Birkenfeld passed to Bischweiler line. |
| Christian II | 22 June 1637 | 1654–1671 | 26 April 1717 | Palatinate-Birkenfeld-Bischweiler | Catherine Agatha of Rappoltstein; 5 September 1667 seven children | Son of Christian I, kept Bischweiler, while his brother John Charles gained Gelnhausen.Inherited Birkenfeld from his cousin Charles Otto, and annexed Bischweiler to it. |
| Christian II | 22 June 1637 | 1671–1717 | 26 April 1717 | Palatinate-Zweibrücken-Birkenfeld | Catherine Agatha of Rappoltstein; 5 September 1667 seven children | Son of Christian I, kept Bischweiler, while his brother John Charles gained Gelnhausen.Inherited Birkenfeld from his cousin Charles Otto, and annexed Bischweiler to it. |
Palatinate-Birkenfeld-Bischweiler definitely reannexed to the Palatinate-Zweibrücken-Birkenfeld
| Charles II (Karl II) | 10 April 1651 | 28 August 1680 – 26 May 1685 | 26 May 1685 | Electoral Palatinate | Wilhelmine Ernestine of Denmark; 20 September 1671; Heidelberg no children | Last of Simmern line. |
| Philip William (Philipp Wilhelm) | 24 November 1615 | 1653–1685 | 2 September 1690 | Palatinate-Neuburg | Anna Catherine of Poland; 8 June 1642; Warsaw no children Elisabeth Amalie of Hesse-Darmstadt; 3 September 1653; Bad Schwalbach seventeen children | When the Simmern branch of the family died out in 1685, the electorate passed to Philip William of Neuburg (also Duke of Jülich and Berg), son of Wolfgang William. He was a Catholic and a maternal nephew of Maximilian I of Bavaria. |
| Philip William (Philipp Wilhelm) | 24 November 1615 | 26 May 1685 – 2 September 1690 | 2 September 1690 | Electoral Palatinate | Anna Catherine of Poland; 8 June 1642; Warsaw no children Elisabeth Amalie of Hesse-Darmstadt; 3 September 1653; Bad Schwalbach seventeen children | When the Simmern branch of the family died out in 1685, the electorate passed to Philip William of Neuburg (also Duke of Jülich and Berg), son of Wolfgang William. He was a Catholic and a maternal nephew of Maximilian I of Bavaria. |
| Adolph John II | 21 August 1666 | 1689–1701 | 27 April 1701 | Palatinate-Kleeburg | Unmarried | Left no descendants. His lands went to his brother, Gustavus. |
| John William (Johann Wilhelm) | 19 April 1658 | 2 September 1690 – 8 June 1716 | 8 June 1716 | Electoral Palatinate | Maria Anna Josepha of Austria; 25 October 1678; Wiener Neustadt two children Anna Maria Luisa de' Medici; 6 May 1691; Innsbruck no children | Left no descendants. He was succeeded by his brother. |
| Charles III | 24 November 1655 | 1693–1697 | 5 April 1697 | Palatinate-Zweibrücken | Ulrika Eleonora of Denmark; 6 May 1680; Skottorp seven children | Son of Charles Gustavus (Charles X of Sweden), assumed the restored Palatinate-Zweibrücken. Also King of Sweden, as Charles XI. |
| Charles IV | 17 June 1682 | 1697–1718 | 30 November 1718 | Palatinate-Zweibrücken | Unmarried | Son of Charles II. Also King of Sweden, as Charles XII. After his death with no descendants, Zweibrücken was inherited by Kleeburg line. |
| Gustavus | 12 April 1670 | 1701–1718 | 17 September 1731 | Palatinate-Kleeburg | Dorothea of Palatinate-Veldenz; 10 July 1707 no children Louise Dorothea von Hoffmann; 13 May 1723 (morganatic) no children | Inherited Zweibrücken from his cousin Charles III, and annexed Kleeburg to it. Left no descendants. His lands went to Birkenfeld line. |
| Gustavus | 12 April 1670 | 1718–1731 | 17 September 1731 | Palatinate-Zweibrücken | Dorothea of Palatinate-Veldenz; 10 July 1707 no children Louise Dorothea von Hoffmann; 13 May 1723 (morganatic) no children | Inherited Zweibrücken from his cousin Charles III, and annexed Kleeburg to it. Left no descendants. His lands went to Birkenfeld line. |
Palatinate-Kleeburg was definitely reannexed to the Palatinate-Zweibrücken
| Regency (1704–1711) | | | | | | Left no male descendants. He was succeeded by his brother John. |
| Frederick Bernard | 28 May 1697 | 1704–1739 | 5 August 1739 | Palatinate-Birkenfeld-Gelnhausen | Ernestine Louise of Waldeck-Pyrmont; 30 May 1737; Arolsen two children | Left no male descendants. He was succeeded by his brother John. |
| Theodore Eustace | 14 February 1659 | 1708–1732 | 11 July 1732 | Palatinate-Sulzbach | Maria Eleonore of Hesse-Rotenburg; 6 June 1692; Lobositz nine children | |
| Charles Philip (Karl III. Philipp) | 4 November 1661 | 8 June 1716 – 31 December 1742 | 31 December 1742 | Electoral Palatinate | Ludwika Karolina Radziwiłł; 10 August 1688; Berlin four children Teresa Lubomirska; 15 December 1701; Kraków two children Violante Theresia of Thurn and Taxis; 1728 (morganatic) no children | Left no descendants. The Electorate went to Sulzbach line. |
| Christian III | 7 November 1674 | 1717–1731 | 3 February 1735 | Palatinate-Zweibrücken-Birkenfeld | Caroline of Nassau-Saarbrücken; 21 September 1719; Lorentzen four children | Inherited Zweibrücken from his cousin Gustavus, and annexed Birkenfeld to it. |
| Christian III | 7 November 1674 | 1731–1735 | 3 February 1735 | Palatinate-Zweibrücken | Caroline of Nassau-Saarbrücken; 21 September 1719; Lorentzen four children | Inherited Zweibrücken from his cousin Gustavus, and annexed Birkenfeld to it. |
Palatinate-Zweibrücken-Birkenfeld definitely reannexed to Palatinate-Zweibrücken
| John Christian | 23 January 1700 | 1732–1733 | 20 July 1733 | Palatinate-Sulzbach | Maria Henriette de La Tour d'Auvergne; 15 February 1722 two children Eleonore of Hesse-Rotenburg; 21 January 1731; Mannheim no children | |
| Regency of Caroline of Nassau-Saarbrücken (1735–1740) | | | | | | His children from his morganatic marriage were barred from succession. He was succeeded by his nephew. |
| Christian IV | 6 September 1722 | 1735–1775 | 5 November 1775 | Palatinate-Zweibrücken | Maria Johanna Camasse; 1751 (morganatic) six children | His children from his morganatic marriage were barred from succession. He was succeeded by his nephew. |
| John | 24 May 1698 | 1739–1780 | 10 February 1780 | Palatinate-Birkenfeld-Gelnhausen | Sophie Charlotte of Salm-Dhaun; 1743; Dhaun eight children | |
| Regency of Charles Philip, Elector Palatine (1733–1738) | | | | | | The title and authority of Elector Palatine were subsumed into the Electorate of Bavaria in 1777. Charles Theodore and his heirs retaining only the single vote and precedence of the Bavarian elector, though they continued to use the title "Count Palatine of the Rhine" (German: Pfalzgraf bei Rhein, Latin: Comes Palatinus Rheni). Left no descendants, and the Electorates passed to Zweibrücken line. |
| Charles Theodore (Karl IV Theodor) | 11 December 1724 | 1733–1742 | 16 February 1799 | Palatinate-Sulzbach | Elisabeth Auguste of Palatinate-Sulzbach; 17 January 1742; Mannheim one child Maria Leopoldine of Austria-Este; 15 February 1795; Innsbruck no children | The title and authority of Elector Palatine were subsumed into the Electorate of Bavaria in 1777. Charles Theodore and his heirs retaining only the single vote and precedence of the Bavarian elector, though they continued to use the title "Count Palatine of the Rhine" (German: Pfalzgraf bei Rhein, Latin: Comes Palatinus Rheni). Left no descendants, and the Electorates passed to Zweibrücken line. |
| Charles Theodore (Karl IV Theodor) | 11 December 1724 | 31 December 1742 – 30 December 1777 | 16 February 1799 | Electoral Palatinate | Elisabeth Auguste of Palatinate-Sulzbach; 17 January 1742; Mannheim one child Maria Leopoldine of Austria-Este; 15 February 1795; Innsbruck no children | The title and authority of Elector Palatine were subsumed into the Electorate of Bavaria in 1777. Charles Theodore and his heirs retaining only the single vote and precedence of the Bavarian elector, though they continued to use the title "Count Palatine of the Rhine" (German: Pfalzgraf bei Rhein, Latin: Comes Palatinus Rheni). Left no descendants, and the Electorates passed to Zweibrücken line. |
| Charles Theodore (Karl IV Theodor) | 11 December 1724 | 30 December 1777 – 16 February 1799 | 16 February 1799 | Electoral Palatinate and Electorate of Bavaria | Elisabeth Auguste of Palatinate-Sulzbach; 17 January 1742; Mannheim one child Maria Leopoldine of Austria-Este; 15 February 1795; Innsbruck no children | The title and authority of Elector Palatine were subsumed into the Electorate of Bavaria in 1777. Charles Theodore and his heirs retaining only the single vote and precedence of the Bavarian elector, though they continued to use the title "Count Palatine of the Rhine" (German: Pfalzgraf bei Rhein, Latin: Comes Palatinus Rheni). Left no descendants, and the Electorates passed to Zweibrücken line. |
| Charles August | 29 October 1746 | 1775–1795 | 1 April 1795 | Palatinate-Zweibrücken | Maria Amalia of Saxony; 12 February 1774; Dresden no children | Son of Frederick Michael, Count Palatine of Zweibrücken, brother of Christian IV. Succeeded his uncle, but left no descendants. He was succeeded by his brother. |
| Charles John | 13/18 September 1745 | 1780–1789 | 31 March 1789 | Palatinate-Birkenfeld-Gelnhausen | Unmarried | Left no male descendants. He was succeeded by his brother William. |
| William | 10 November 1752 | 1789–1799 | 8 January 1837 | Palatinate-Birkenfeld-Gelnhausen | Maria Anna of Zweibrücken-Birkenfeld; 30 January 1780; Mannheim three children | In 1799 his lands were annexed to Bavaria. |
Palatinate-Birkenfeld-Gelnhausen definitely annexed to the Electorate of Bavaria
| Maximilian Joseph (Maximilian I. Joseph) | 27 May 1756 | 1795–1799 | 13 October 1825 | Palatinate-Zweibrücken | Augusta Wilhelmine of Hesse-Darmstadt; 30 September 1785; Darmstadt five children Caroline of Baden; 9 March 1797; Karlsruhe eight children | Charles Theodore's heir, Maximilian Joseph, Duke of Zweibrücken (on the French border), brought all the Wittelsbach territories under a single rule in 1799. The Palatinate was dissolved in the Wars of the French Revolution. First, its left bank territories were occupied (and then annexed) by France starting in 1795; then, in 1803, its right bank territories were taken by the Margrave of Baden. The Rhenish Palatinate, as a distinct territory, disappeared. In 1806, the Holy Roman Empire was abolished, and all the rights and responsibilities of the electors with it. |
| Maximilian Joseph (Maximilian I. Joseph) | 27 May 1756 | 16 February 1799 – 27 April 1803 | 13 October 1825 | Electoral Palatinate and Electorate of Bavaria | Augusta Wilhelmine of Hesse-Darmstadt; 30 September 1785; Darmstadt five children Caroline of Baden; 9 March 1797; Karlsruhe eight children | |
| Maximilian Joseph (Maximilian I. Joseph) | 27 May 1756 | 27 April 1803 – 1 January 1806 | 13 October 1825 | Electorate of Bavaria | Augusta Wilhelmine of Hesse-Darmstadt; 30 September 1785; Darmstadt five children Caroline of Baden; 9 March 1797; Karlsruhe eight children | |
Palatinate-Zweibrücken was definitely annexed to the Electorate of Bavaria
Electoral Palatinate was definitely annexed to the Electorate of Bavaria

== Electors of Bavaria and counts palatine of the Rhine, 1777–1803 ==
Zweibrücken Line
| Image | Name | Began | Ended | Notes |
| | Maximilian I Joseph | 16 February 1799 | 27 April 1803 | Charles Theodore's heir, Maximilian Joseph, Duke of Zweibrücken (on the French border), brought all the Wittelsbach territories under a single rule in 1799. The Palatinate was dissolved in the Wars of the French Revolution. First, its left bank territories were occupied (and then annexed) by France starting in 1795; then, in 1803, its right bank territories were taken by the Margrave of Baden. The Rhenish Palatinate, as a distinct territory, disappeared. In 1806, the Holy Roman Empire was abolished, and all the rights and responsibilities of the electors with it. |

== Later history ==
Following the great restorations of 1815, the Lower Palatinate (albeit without any prince-elector role) was restored as one of eight Bavarian Districts. After World War II the American Military Government of Germany took the Lower Palatinate from Bavaria and merged it with neighbouring territories to form a new state called Rhineland-Palatinate (German: Rheinland-Pfalz) with Mainz as the state capital. The people had felt neglected by the governments in Munich for generations and later approved the merger in a plebiscite.

The present head of the House of Wittelsbach, Franz, Duke of Bavaria (born 1933), is still traditionally styled as His Royal Highness the Duke of Bavaria, Duke of Franconia and in Swabia, Count Palatine of the Rhine. One task that still tied him to the former Palatinate area was the chairmanship of the board of trustees of the European Foundation for the Imperial Cathedral of Speyer in the State of Rhineland-Palatinate. However, due to his age, he handed this task over to his brother Max Emanuel Herzog in Bayern.
