= Palatinate-Lützelstein =

Ephemeral state of the Holy Roman Empire based around La Petite-Pierre, France

Coordinates: 48°51′41″N 7°19′15″E

County Palatine of Lützelstein Pfalz-Lützelstein
- 1598–1611
- Coat of arms
- Status: State of the Holy Roman Empire
- Capital: La Petite-Pierre
- Common languages: German
- Government: Principality
- Count Palatine
  - 1598 - 1611: John Augustus
- Historical era: Early modern period
  - Split from Palatinate-Veldenz: 1598
  - to Palatinate-Guttenberg: 1611
Preceded by	Succeeded by
County of Veldenz	Palatinate-Lützelstein-Guttenberg

Palatinate-Lützelstein was an ephemeral state of the Holy Roman Empire based around La Petite-Pierre (German: Lützelstein), located in the Vosges Mountains, in the present-day Bas-Rhin and Moselle départements of the Grand Est region in northeastern France.

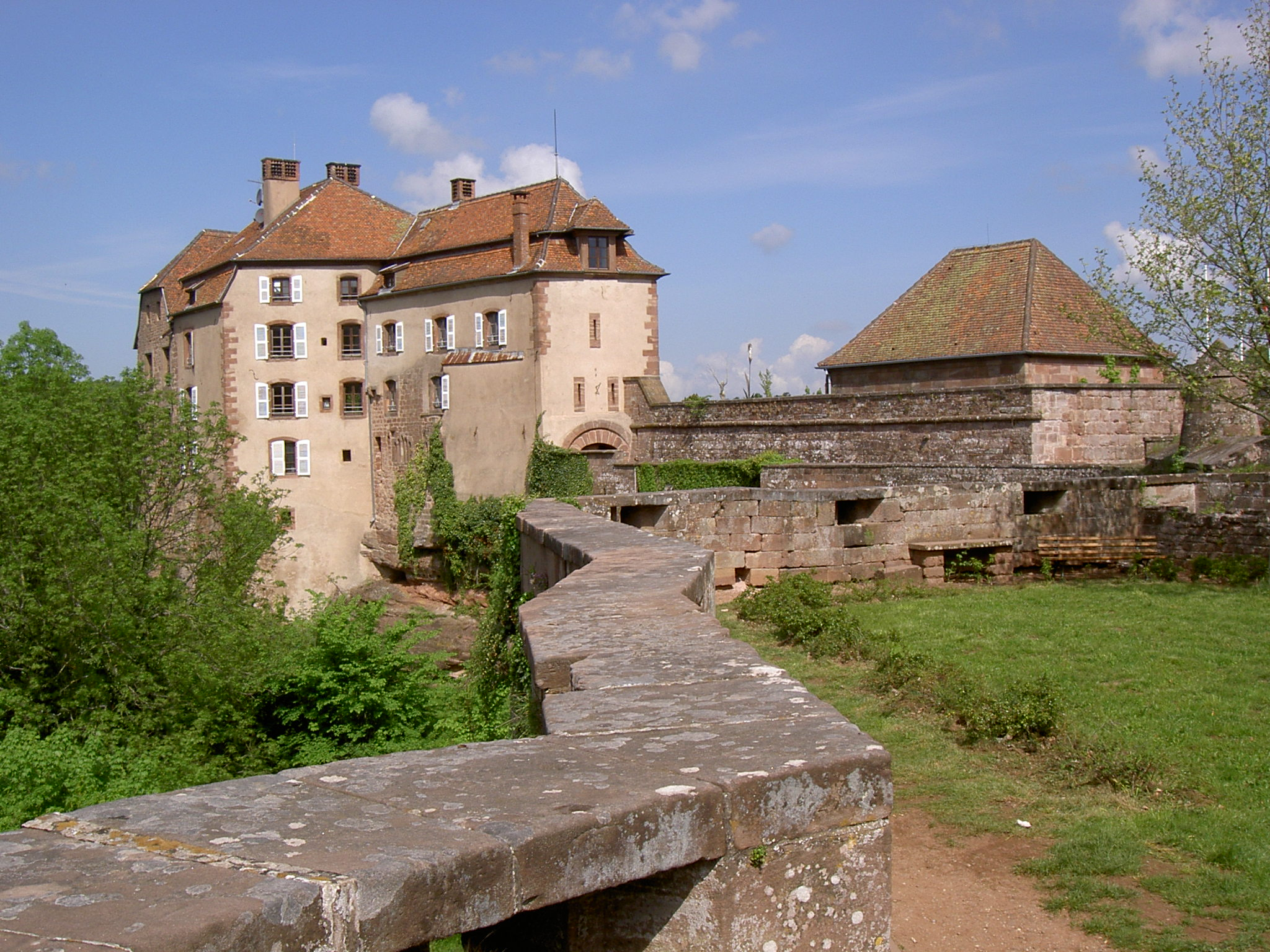
Lützelstein Castle

Lützelstein Castle, erected by the Counts of Blieskastel at a mountain pass to Lorraine, and the surrounding territory originally were a fief of the Bishopric of Strasbourg. Held by the elder House of Leiningen, who had accepted the suzerainty of the Electorate of the Palatinate, the lands were seized as a reverted fief by the mighty Wittelsbach Elector Palatine Frederick I upon the extinction of the Leiningen counts in 1462.

In the course of a 1553 re-arrangement of the Palatinate territories, Lützelstein was allotted to Count Palatine Wolfgang of Zweibrücken, who ceded the estates to his uncle Count Palatine Rupert of Veldenz. His son Count Palatine George John I of Veldenz founded the town of Phalsbourg (Pfalzburg), which he nevertheless was forced to pledge to Duke Charles III of Lorraine shortly afterwards.

Upon the death of Count Palatine George John I in 1592, Palatinate-Veldenz was administrated by his widow Princess Anna Maria of Sweden, until in 1598 her sons divided their heritage. Palatinate-Lützelstein was created for Count Palatine John Augustus, who had received the territories around Lützelstein.

John Augustus himself died without issue in 1611 and was succeeded by his younger brother Count Palatine George John II of Guttenberg, who renamed the united state Palatinate-Lützelstein-Guttenberg. As he himself left no surviving children upon his death in 1654, his territory fell back to Palatinate-Veldenz.

With the Alsace region, the Lützelstein territory was annexed by France according to the 1697 Treaty of Ryswick following the Nine Years' War of the Palatinate Succession, and finally incorporated into the Bas-Rhin département in 1801.
