= Palatinate-Guttenberg =

Palatinate-Guttenberg was a state of the Holy Roman Empire based around Guttenberg in the south of modern Rhineland-Palatinate, Germany.

Palatinate-Guttenberg was created in the partition of County of Veldenz#Palantine Veldenz LinePalatinate-Veldenz in 1598 for Louis Philip and George John II, the two younger sons of George John I. Louis Philip died in 1601 leaving George John II as the sole ruler. In 1611, he inherited Palatinate-Lützelstein from his elder brother John Augustus, Count Palatine of Lützelstein, and George John renamed his state to Palatinate-Lützelstein-Guttenberg.

Name	Notes
Louis Philip	1598–1601
George John II	1598–1611
