= Lixheim =

- Commune
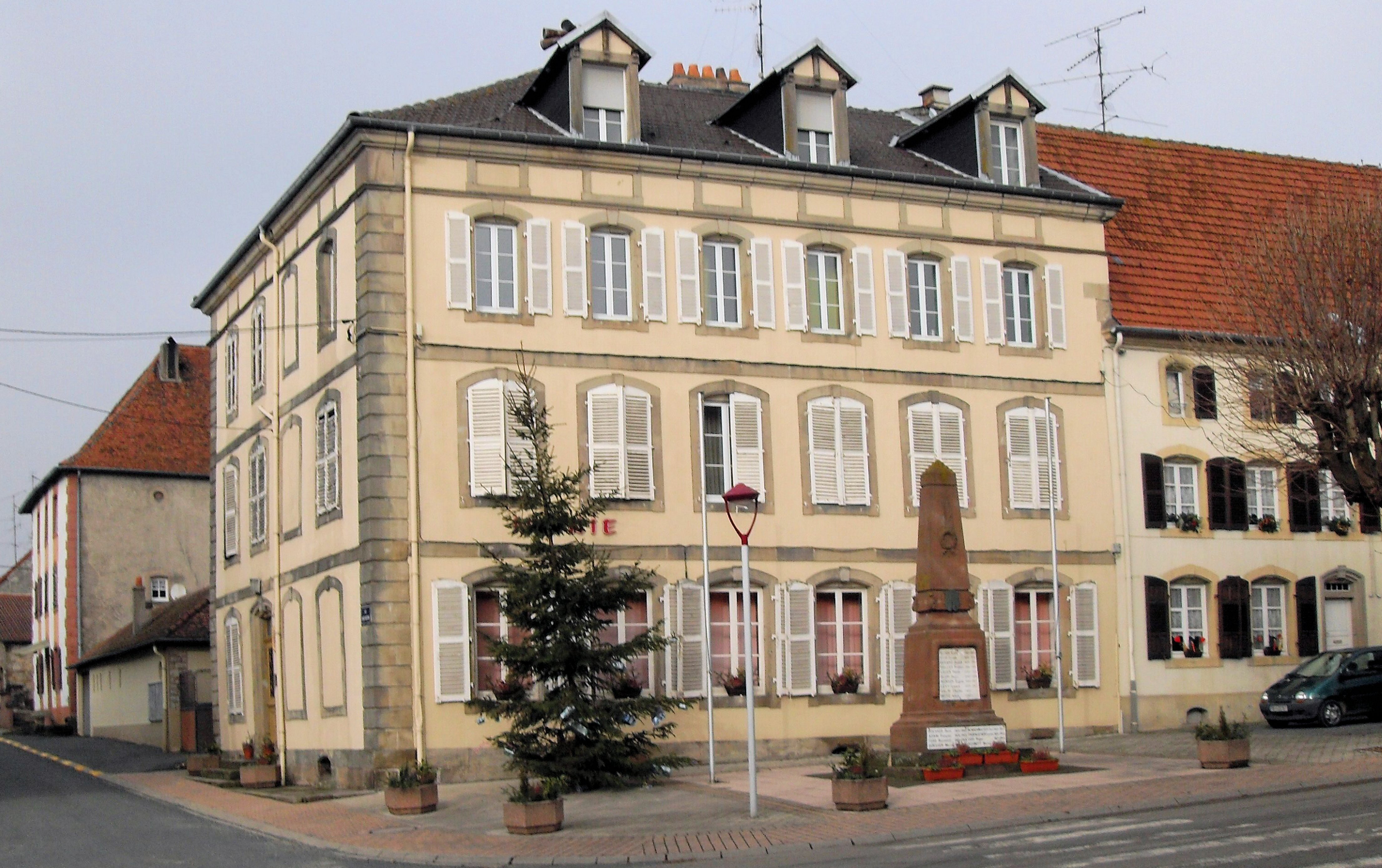
- The town hall in Lixheim

- Coat of arms
- Location of Lixheim
- Location within France Location within Grand Est
- Coordinates: 48°46′32″N 7°08′34″E
- Country: France
- Region: Grand Est
- Department: Moselle
- Arrondissement: Sarrebourg-Château-Salins
- Canton: Phalsbourg
- Intercommunality: CC du Pays de Phalsbourg

Government
  - Mayor (2020–2026): Christian Untereiner
- Area^{1}: 3.96 km^{2} (1.53 sq mi)
- Elevation: 350 m (1,150 ft)
- Highest elevation: 336 m (1,102 ft)
- Lowest elevation: 268 m (879 ft)
- Population (2023): 552
  - Density: 139/km^{2} (361/sq mi)
- Time zone: UTC+01:00 (CET)
  - Summer (DST): UTC+02:00 (CEST)
- INSEE/Postal code: 57407 /57635
- ^{1} French Land Register data, which excludes lakes, ponds, glaciers > 1 km^{2} (0.386 sq mi or 247 acres) and river estuaries.

Lixheim is a commune of France in the northeastern Moselle department of Grand Est, a kilometre southeast of another commune, Vieux-Lixheim.

== History ==
The first Lixheim (now Vieux-Lixheim) was founded by a Benedictine priory in the 12th century.

The new town was founded by Count Palatine George Gustavus in 1608 to replace Phalsbourg, which his father Count Palatine George John I had had to cede. In their small principality of the county of Lutzelstein (La Petite-Pierre), the Counts Palatine wanted to create fortified towns capable of accommodating their Reformed co-religionists, who had been expelled from the Duchy of Lorraine.

Nevertheless, Lixheim was sold to the Duke of Lorraine in 1623; despite his commitment to freedom of Protestant worship, Duke Henry II The Good did little to resist the pressures that drove many of the Reformed inhabitants into exodus.

In 1629–1660, Lixheim and Phalsbourg formed the short-lived principality of Phalsbourg and Lixheim, for the benefit of Henriette de Lorraine and her three successive husbands, including Louis de Guise. The princess had coins minted in Lixheim.

On the death of the princess, the principality's territories reverted to the Duchy of Lorraine. Duke Leopold observed in his own way the tolerance promised by Henry II: the Reformed were allowed to worship in the neighboring county of Nassau-Sarrewerden (Alsace bossue), a modest but commendable concession from a sovereign whose House had always fiercely defended Catholicism.

== See also ==
- Communes of the Moselle department
