= Palatinate-Lützelstein-Guttenberg =

State in the Holy Roman Empire

Palatinate-Lützelstein-Guttenberg; Pfalz-Lützelstein-Guttenberg
1611 – 1654
Capital; Circle; Bench	Guttenberg Castle none none
Palatinate-Guttenberg	1611
Extinct; to Palatinate-Veldenz	1654

Palatinate-Lützelstein-Guttenberg was a state of the Holy Roman Empire based around La Petite-Pierre in the far northeast of France.

Palatinate-Lützelstein-Guttenberg was created in 1611 when George John II of Palatinate-Guttenberg inherited Palatinate-Lützelstein from his brother John Augustus. After George John died in 1654, Palatinate-Lützelstein-Guttenberg was inherited by the elder Palatinate-Veldenz line.

Name	Notes
George John II	1611–1654
