= Anne of Sweden =

Anne of Sweden - Swedish: Anna - may refer to:

- Anne of Austria, Queen of Poland (1573–1598), Queen consort of Sweden as of 1592
- Anne, Princess of Sweden 1470, daughter of King Charles VIII of Sweden
- Princess Anna Maria of Sweden (1545–1610) (Anna Maria - Anne Mary)
- Anna Vasa of Sweden (1568–1625), Princess of Sweden
- Anna Maria, Princess of Sweden 1593, daughter of King Sigismund III Vasa (died young)
