= George John II, Count Palatine of Lützelstein-Guttenberg =

George John II (German: Georg Johann II.) (24 June 1586 – 29 September 1654) was the co-Duke of Veldenz from 1592 until 1598 and the Duke of Guttenberg from 1598 until 1611, and the Duke of Lützelstein-Guttenberg from 1611 until 1654.

== Life ==
Georg Johann II was born in 1586 as the youngest son of Georg Johann I, Count Palatine of Lützelstein. His father died in 1592, and George John and his brothers succeeded him under the regency of their mother Anna of Sweden. In 1598 the brothers partitioned the territories; George John II received half of the Guttenberg territory. In 1601 he received the other half of Guttenberg when his brother Louis Philip died. In 1611 he inherited the County of Lützelstein following the death of his brother Johann Augustus. Georg Johann died in 1654.

== Marriage ==
George John married Princess Susanne of Pfalz-Sulzbach (6 June 1591 – 21 February 1661) on 6 June 1613, daughter of the Count Otto Henry, Count Palatine of Sulzbach, on 6 June 1613 and had the following children:

1. Georg Otto (25 September 1614 – 30 August 1635)
2. Anne Maria (20 June 1616 – 13 September 1616)
3. John Frederick (5 September 1617 – 21 February 1618)
4. Philip Louis (4 October 1619 – 19 March 1620)

Regnal titles
Preceded by George John I	Duke of Veldenz; 1592 – 1598; With: George Gustavus, Johann Augustus & Louis Philip	Duchy divided
New title	Duke of Guttenberg; 1598 – 1654; With: Louis Philip (1598 – 1601)	Merged with County of Lützelstein
Preceded by Johann Augustus	Duke of Lützelstein; 1611 – 1654	Succeeded by Leopold Louis
