= Phalsbourg =

- Commune
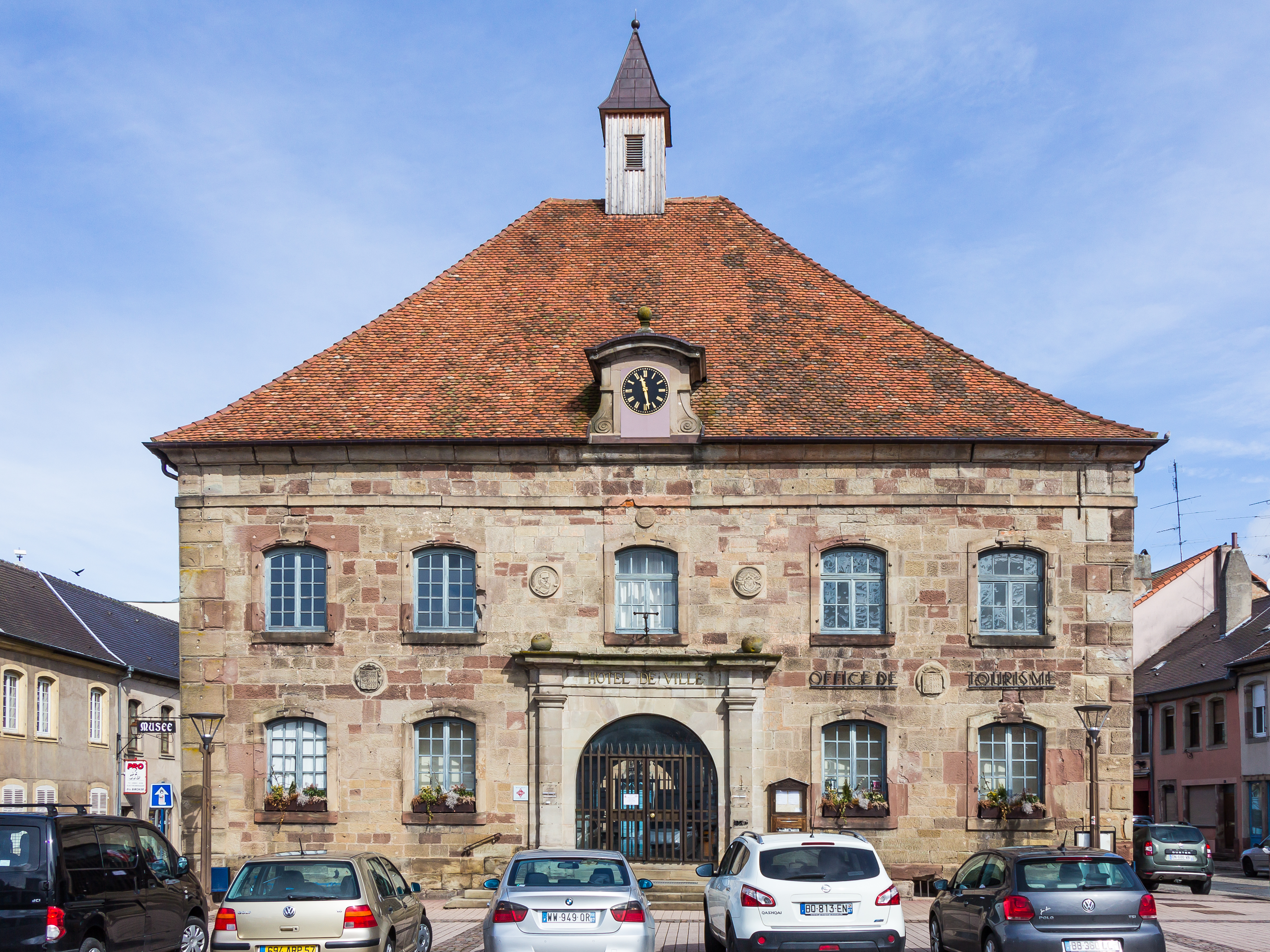
- Town hall of Phalsbourg, former Corps de Garde

- Coat of arms
- Location of Phalsbourg
- Location within France Location within Grand Est
- Coordinates: 48°46′N 7°16′E
- Country: France
- Region: Grand Est
- Department: Moselle
- Arrondissement: Sarrebourg-Château-Salins
- Canton: Phalsbourg
- Intercommunality: Pays de Phalsbourg

Government
  - Mayor (2020–2026): Jean-Louis Madelaine
- Area^{1}: 13.15 km^{2} (5.08 sq mi)
- Elevation: 380 m (1,250 ft)
- Highest elevation: 384 m (1,260 ft)
- Lowest elevation: 200 m (660 ft)
- Population (2023): 4,688
  - Density: 356.5/km^{2} (923.3/sq mi)
- Demonym: phalsbourgeois
- Time zone: UTC+01:00 (CET)
  - Summer (DST): UTC+02:00 (CEST)
- INSEE/Postal code: 57540 /57370
- Website: www.phalsbourg.fr
- ^{1} French Land Register data, which excludes lakes, ponds, glaciers > 1 km^{2} (0.386 sq mi or 247 acres) and river estuaries.

Phalsbourg (French pronunciation: [falsbuʁ]; German: Pfalzburg; Lorraine Franconian: Phalsburch) is a commune in the Moselle department in Grand Est in north-eastern France, with a population of about 4,700.

It lies high on the west slopes of the Vosges, 25 miles (40 km) northwest of Strasbourg. In 1911, it contained an Evangelical and a Roman Catholic church, a synagogue and a teachers' seminary. Its industries then included the manufacture of gloves, straw hats and liqueurs, and quarrying.

== History ==
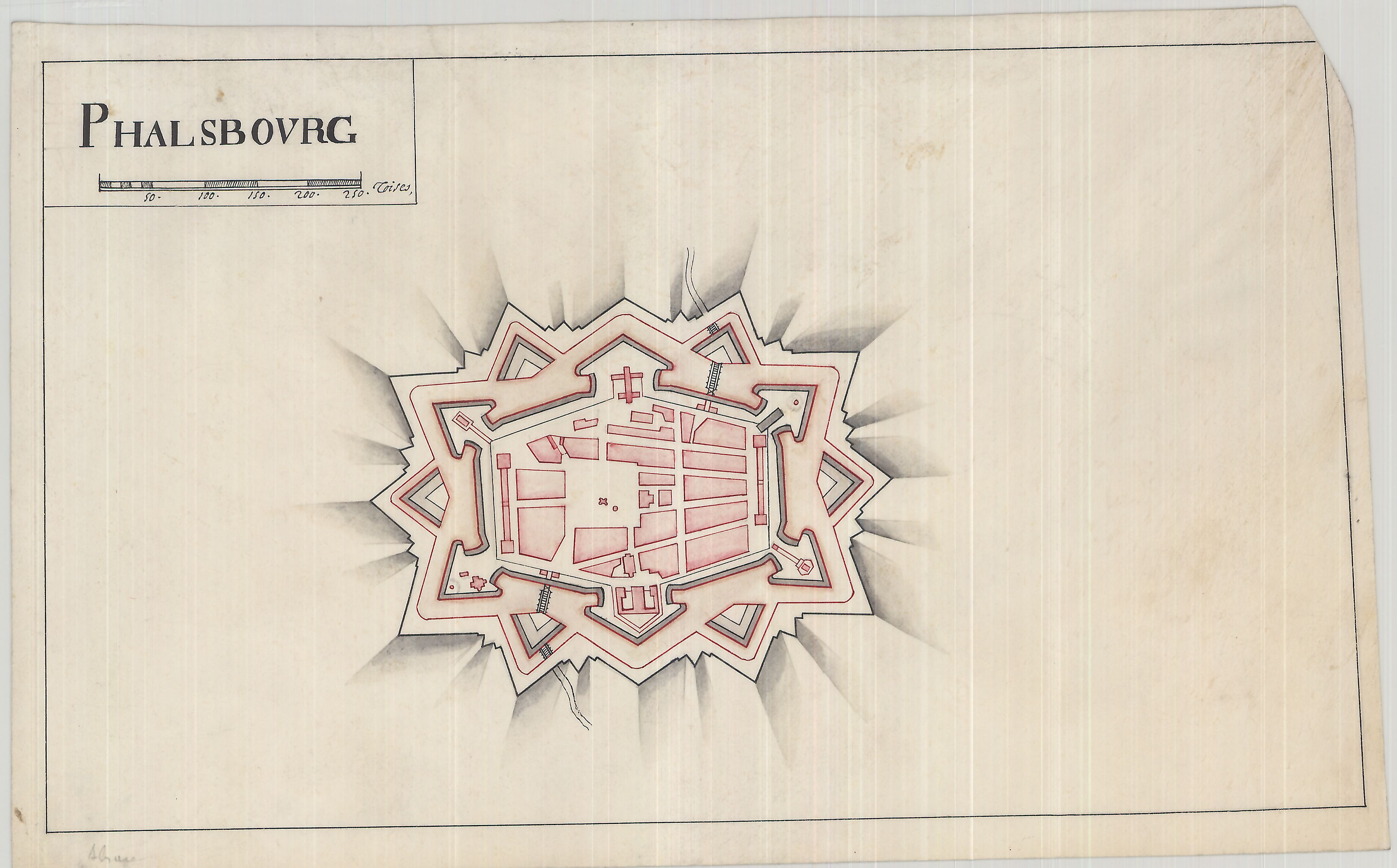
Phalsbourg 1850

The area of the city of Phalsbourg, originally Pfalzburg, was originally part of the principality of Lützelstein, under the overlordship of Luxembourg, then the bishops of Metz and of Strasbourg, before becoming possessed by the Dukes of Palantine Veldenz, all within the Holy Roman Empire of the German Nation. In 1570, Duke George John I, Count Palatine of Veldenz founded the town of Pfalzburg as a refuge for Reformed Protestants expelled from the Duchy of Lorraine, and as an administrative center of his holdings. But the cost forced him to sell the city and the surrounding district of Einarzhausen between 1583 and 1590 to Lorraine, the territory of which surrounded most of the area. In 1608, his successor Georg Gustav of Palantine Veldenz founded nearby Lixheim for Reformed refugees, but was also forced to sell the new town in 1623 to Lorraine.

From 1629 to 1660, Pfalzburg and Lixheim were combined as the Principality of Pfalzburg, for duchess Henriette of Lorraine (1605-1660) and her three successive husbands. The principality was acknowledged by Holy Roman Emperor Ferdinand II in 1629. After the death of Henriette, the principality returned to Lorraine. But the next year, Lorraine had to cede it to France in the Treaty of Vincennes in 1661, at a time when most of Lorraine was occupied by French troops since 1634.

The famous French military engineer Vauban reconstructed the town's fortifications in 1680. The town was of military importance as commanding one of the passes of the Vosges. The fortifications of Phalsbourg resisted the Allies in 1814 and 1815, and the Germans commanded by Taillant for four months during 1870, but they were taken on 12 December of that year, and have since been razed. The town was German again from 1871 to 1918, with its old name of Pfalzburg.

The United States Air Forces in Europe built an air base near the city in 1953. The base was returned in 1967 to the French government, which redesignated it as "Quartier La Horie". The base is currently used by the French military's 1er Régiment d'Hélicoptères de Combat.

== Culture ==
Johann Wolfgang von Goethe visited the town on 23 June 1770, and mentioned his stay in his autobiography Dichtung und Wahrheit.

The town is home to a week long theatre summer festival since 1980.

== Population ==
Historical population
Year	Pop.	±% p.a.
1905	3,716	—
1968	3,379	−0.15%
1975	3,905	+2.09%
1982	3,848	−0.21%
1990	4,189	+1.07%
1999	4,499	+0.80%
2007	4,661	+0.44%
2012	4,789	+0.54%
2017	4,728	−0.26%
2023	4,688	−0.14%
Source: 1911 Encyclopædia Britannica. and INSEE

== Climate ==
The climate in this area has mild differences between highs and lows, and there is adequate rainfall year-round. The Köppen Climate Classification subtype for this climate is "Cfb" (Marine West Coast Climate/Oceanic climate).

Climate data for Phalsbourg, elevation: 377 m (1,237 ft) (1991-2020 normals, extremes 1945-present)
Month	Jan	Feb	Mar	Apr	May	Jun	Jul	Aug	Sep	Oct	Nov	Dec	Year
Record high °C (°F)	17.1 (62.8)	19.6 (67.3)	24.3 (75.7)	28.8 (83.8)	31.8 (89.2)	34.7 (94.5)	37.0 (98.6)	38.1 (100.6)	32.3 (90.1)	27.8 (82.0)	21.5 (70.7)	18.7 (65.7)	38.1 (100.6)
Mean daily maximum °C (°F)	4.0 (39.2)	5.5 (41.9)	10.0 (50.0)	14.8 (58.6)	18.7 (65.7)	22.4 (72.3)	24.3 (75.7)	24.1 (75.4)	19.6 (67.3)	13.9 (57.0)	7.9 (46.2)	4.7 (40.5)	14.2 (57.6)
Daily mean °C (°F)	1.6 (34.9)	2.6 (36.7)	6.2 (43.2)	10.2 (50.4)	14.0 (57.2)	17.4 (63.3)	19.4 (66.9)	19.3 (66.7)	15.2 (59.4)	10.6 (51.1)	5.5 (41.9)	2.5 (36.5)	10.4 (50.7)
Mean daily minimum °C (°F)	−0.7 (30.7)	−0.3 (31.5)	2.5 (36.5)	5.5 (41.9)	9.2 (48.6)	12.5 (54.5)	14.5 (58.1)	14.4 (57.9)	10.8 (51.4)	7.2 (45.0)	3.1 (37.6)	0.2 (32.4)	6.6 (43.9)
Record low °C (°F)	−18.6 (−1.5)	−22.0 (−7.6)	−13.7 (7.3)	−5.5 (22.1)	−1.8 (28.8)	3.0 (37.4)	4.9 (40.8)	4.7 (40.5)	0.4 (32.7)	−6.0 (21.2)	−10.3 (13.5)	−16.9 (1.6)	−22.0 (−7.6)
Average precipitation mm (inches)	68.2 (2.69)	64.3 (2.53)	66.8 (2.63)	53.9 (2.12)	81.2 (3.20)	68.9 (2.71)	71.6 (2.82)	72.7 (2.86)	72.2 (2.84)	83.1 (3.27)	75.3 (2.96)	86.7 (3.41)	864.9 (34.05)
Average precipitation days (≥ 1.0 mm)	11.9	10.7	10.5	9.5	11.3	10.5	10.2	10.2	9.4	11.7	11.6	13.1	130.7
Mean monthly sunshine hours	43.5	76.9	121.3	163.6	203.6	215.6	237.0	208.5	181.4	114.6	50.3	43.8	1,660.1
Source 1: Meteociel
Source 2: Infoclimat (sunshine hours)

== Notable people ==
- Christoph Theodor Aeby (1835-1885), anatomist, anthropologist, and academic
- Jean-Baptiste-Adolphe Charras (1810-1865), soldier, military historian and political figure
- Alexandre Chatrian (1826-1890), writer
- Émile Erckmann (1822-1899), writer
- George John I, Count Palatine of Veldenz (1543-1592), founder of Phalsbourg
- Mathieu Klein (1976-), mayor of Nancy
- Philippe Klein (1957-), engineer and businessman in the automotive industry
- Joseph Alfred Micheler (1861-1931), general during World War I
- Georges Mouton (1770-1838), soldier and political figure
- Louis Dominique Munnier (1734-1800), general of the French Revolutionary Wars
- Fatih Öztürk (1986-), football player who played in the Süper Lig
- Romuald Peiser (1979-), former football player who played for Troyes and Gueugnon
- Henri Rottembourg (1769-1857), soldier, division commander in the Napoleonic Wars
- Mathilde Salomon (1837-1907), director of Collège Sévigné from 1883 to 1909
- Jean-Jacques Uhrich (1802-1886), military governor during the Franco-Prussian War
- Pierre Veltz (1945-), academic, urban planner
- Nicolas Krick (1819-1854), priest from Phalsbourg, then missionary with the Paris Foreign Missions.

== See also ==
- Communes of the Moselle department
