= Louis Philip, Count Palatine of Guttenberg =

Palatinate-Veldenz nobleman (1577–1601)

Louis Philip (German: Ludwig Philipp) (24 November 1577 – 24 October 1601) was the co-Duke of Veldenz from 1592 until 1598 and the Duke of Guttenberg from 1598 until 1601.

== Life ==
Louis Philip was born in 1577 as the third surviving son of George John I, Count Palatine of Lützelstein. His father died in 1592, and Louis Philip and his brothers succeeded him under the regency of their mother Anna of Sweden. In 1598 the brothers partitioned the territories; Louis Philip received half of the territory of Guttenberg. Louis Philip died there in 1601 and was probably buried in Heidelberg.

Regnal titles
Preceded by George John I	Duke of Veldenz; 1592 – 1598; With: George Gustavus, John Augustus & George John II	Duchy divided
New title	Duke of Guttenberg; 1598 – 1601; With: George John II	Succeeded by George John II
