= La Petite-Pierre =

- Commune
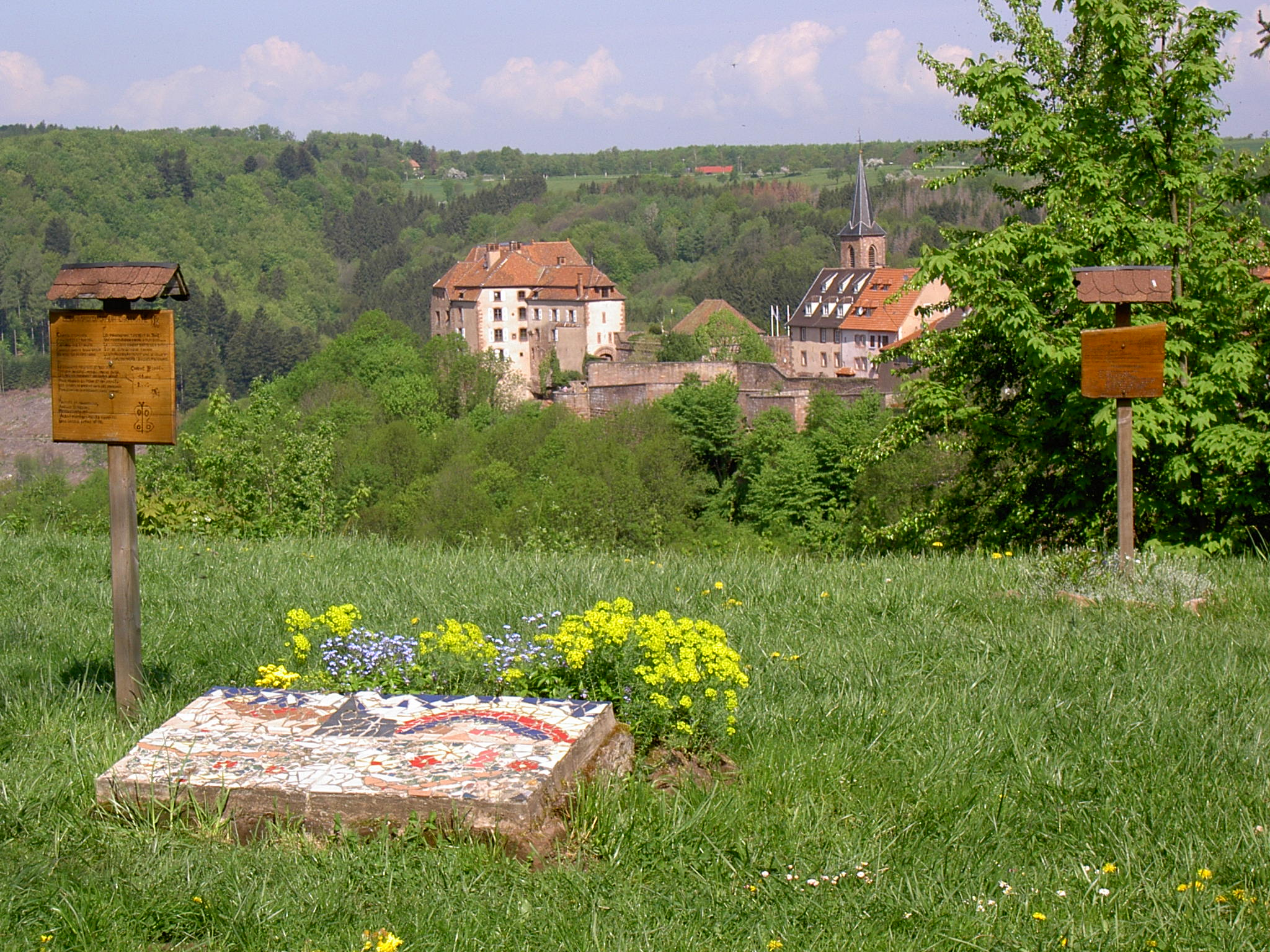
- A general view of La Petite-Pierre

- Coat of arms
- Location of La Petite-Pierre
- Location within France Location within Grand Est
- Coordinates: 48°52′N 7°19′E
- Country: France
- Region: Grand Est
- Department: Bas-Rhin
- Arrondissement: Saverne
- Canton: Ingwiller

Government
  - Mayor (2020–2026): Claude Windstein
- Area^{1}: 19.57 km^{2} (7.56 sq mi)
- Highest elevation: 397 m (1,302 ft)
- Lowest elevation: 215 m (705 ft)
- Population (2023): 586
  - Density: 29.9/km^{2} (77.6/sq mi)
- Time zone: UTC+01:00 (CET)
  - Summer (DST): UTC+02:00 (CEST)
- INSEE/Postal code: 67371 /67290
- ^{1} French Land Register data, which excludes lakes, ponds, glaciers > 1 km^{2} (0.386 sq mi or 247 acres) and river estuaries.

La Petite-Pierre (French pronunciation: [la pətit pjɛʁ]; German: Lützelstein; Rhine Franconian: Lítzelstain) is a commune in the Bas-Rhin department in Grand Est in north-eastern France. It lies in the historical and cultural region of Alsace (Elsass in German). Petit-Pierre literally means little rock.

The town lies in the Northern Vosges Regional Nature Park which has its headquarter in the château (Maison du Parc).

== History ==
Lützelstein castle was built by Count Hugo, who was the son of Hugh, Count of Blieskastel. It was claimed by the Bishop of Strasbourg in 1223, but the count successfully defended it. After Count Friedrich died without a male successor, the county was subject to a protracted inheritance dispute between his uncle, Frederick Burkhard, and his sister, who was married to John of Leiningen. Both John and the sons of Burkhard died within a short time and without heirs, so the entire county was passed to the Electoral Palatinate in 1462.

During the partition of the House of Wittelsbach territories in 1533, Lützelstein county was passed to the Palatinate-Zweibrücken. Wolfgang, Count Palatine of Zweibrücken gave it to Ruprecht, Count Palatine of Veldenz, his uncle.

George John I, Count Palatine of Veldenz attempted to develop his Alsatian territories as the focus of his state, which led to him building the city of Pfalzburg in 1570 and populating it with Protestant refugees from the Duchy of Lorraine. The project was so grand and unaffordable that in 1583 he was forced to sell the city and half the County of Lützelstein to Lorraine.

After the death of George John I, Anna Maria of Sweden ruled the county as regent. After the division of Palatinate-Veldenz in 1598, the County of Lützelstein was passed to John Augustus, Count Palatine of Lützelstein. John Augustus himself died without issue in 1611 and was succeeded by his younger brother Count Palatine George John II of Guttenberg, who renamed the united state Palatinate-Lützelstein-Guttenberg. As he himself left no surviving children upon his death in 1654, his territory fell back to Palatinate-Veldenz. After Leopold Louis, Count Palatine of Veldenz died without issue, the county was returned to Palatinate-Zweibrücken in 1694. However, Palatinate rule of Lützelstein after 1680 was nominal due to French occupation of it. After the signing of the Treaty of Ryswick, Lützelstein was nominally ruled by Zweibrücken as a French fief, but was de facto ruled by the Kingdom of France. Vauban, the French marshall, expanded its fortress. The fortress was again expanded in 1815 but was partially demolished in 1872 by Germans. Finally it was formally annexed by France with the Palatinate-Zweibrücken and was part of the Bas-Rhin department in 1801. Thereafter it has shared the fate of Alsace since 1801.

== Notable people ==
- François Antoine Louis Bourcier, a French cavalry officer and divisional general of the French Revolutionary Wars and the Napoleonic Wars.
- René Char, hid in the woods between la Petit-Pierre and Petersbach, for about six months, during the phoney war.

== Tourism ==
The upper part of the town is built as a fortified city around the Château de La Petite-Pierre (also known as Chateau de Lützelstein). There is also a church, which was built in the fifteenth century (parts of which remain) and has some nice artwork.

The area around the town is suitable for walking or hiking. There are a number of marked trails. The town has its own division of Club Vosgien.

== International relations ==
La Petite-Pierre is twinned with

- Veldenz, Germany

== See also ==
- Communes of the Bas-Rhin department
