= Château de La Petite-Pierre =

Castle in Grand Est, France

Coordinates: 48°51′26″N 7°18′53″E

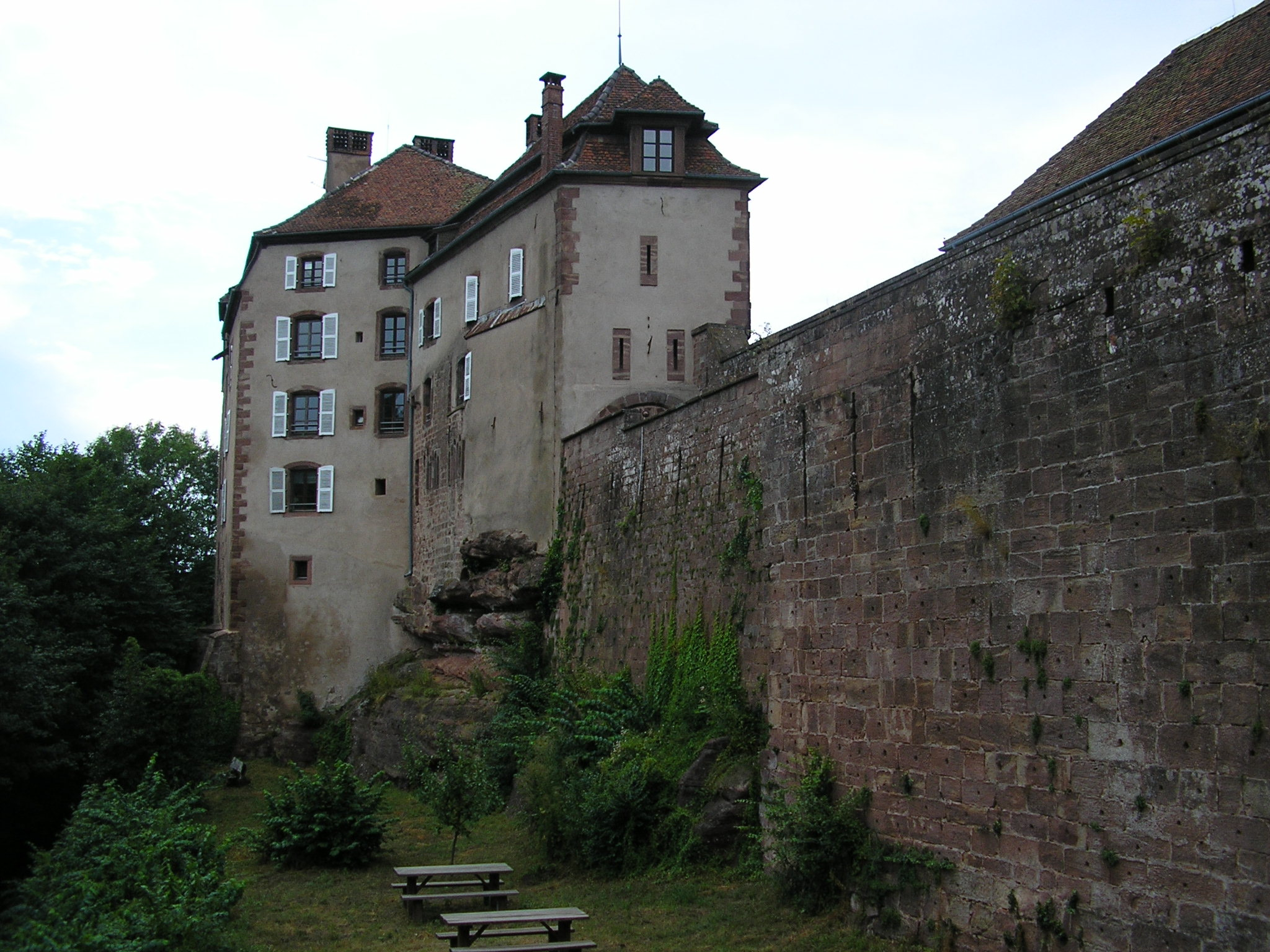

The Château de la Petite-Pierre, Burg Lützelstein (German) is a castle in the commune of La Petite-Pierre (German: Lützelstein) in the Bas-Rhin département of France, in Alsace (German: Elsass). All the names of the place are related to "small stone" (Latin: parva petra), and come from Old Franconian Lítzelstäin, with the French name as a translation.

It is the headquarters of the Parc naturel régional des Vosges du Nord. It has been listed as monument historique by the French Ministry of Culture since April 1922.

== History ==
Originally there was a stronghold in the place, built by the family of Hugues IV of Nordgau (fr), Count of Egisheim.

Built at the end of the 12th century, the Château de la Petite-Pierre is recorded from 1212. Count Hugo, either the son or grandson of the powerful Count of Blieskastel (fr), is held as the constructor. The fief was recognised as the "County of Lützelstein", within the German Holy Roman Empire, approximately at the same time.

The counts have used the title Graf von Lützelstein, later also Comte de Petite-Pierre, meaning basically the same, also Comte de Lunéville (in Lorraine), which might be due to a confusion of transferral of power at some point.

A probable, incomplete, order of the early counts of Lützelstein, as precise documentation is not at hand:

- Hugo I of Blieskastel (d.a. 1220), Count of Lützelstein or Lunéville (or both), second son of Folmar I (d.a. 1179), Count of Blieskastel with Clementia of Metz. His brother Folmar II, Count of Blieskastel was married to Jutta, daughter of Simon I, Count of Saarbrücken. Hugo married Kunigunde, daughter of Konrad, Count of Kyrburg and Mathilde of Bar, and had Hugo II.
  - Hugo II of Blieskastel, Count of Lützelstein (1208? - a. 1246). Married Judith (Joathe) of Lorraine, daughter of Philippe, son of Frederick I, Duke of Lorraine ("Ferry").
    - Hugo III, Count of Lützelstein (Perhaps also Lunéville) (d.a. 1280/99), married Elisabeth (d.a. 1271), daughter of Simon III, Count of Saarbrücken. Probably also Elisabeth of Vinstingen, a grandniece of Simon.

In 1223, due to a conflict with the Bishop of Strasbourg, the counts of Parva Petra were forced to yield it as a fief to the bishop as an episcopal stronghold, under the bishop's reign.

In 1403, Friedrich of Lutzelstein died as the last was the last male heir of the castle. His uncle Bourcard/Burkhard II of Lutzelstein, Bishop of Strasbourg (in office 1393 - 1394), was one of the claimants, as well as Friedrich's sister, married to Johann of Leiningen. Burkhard (of Friedrich?) divided the property letting Palatine count Robert III, Holy Roman Emperor a fourth and the rest to his daughters. Sons of Burkhard and of the Leiningen family ruled for some time in Lützelstein. However the Palatine count Frederick I (1425 - 1476) seized it all in 1452/62 as the new holders died without legitimate heirs. In 1566, it became the residence of George John I, Count Palatine of Veldenz, who carried out major works. The French Army occupied the castle in 1677; in 1681 the county was joined with in France. Vauban was charged with improving the fortifications. In 1870 that the fortifications were removed.

Since 1977, the building has housed the administrative services of the Parc naturel régional (Natural Regional Park) of Vosges du Nord. In the multi-media exhibition there, a room is specifically devoted to the history of the castle with, in particular, a superb model of Staedtel, the fortified old town, according to plans of 1771, and an impressive sight of the castle's ancient cistern.

The fortified town, with the Saint-Louis chapel, the 15th-century church choir and the bastion tower protecting the cisterns, is closely linked to the castle.

== Architecture ==
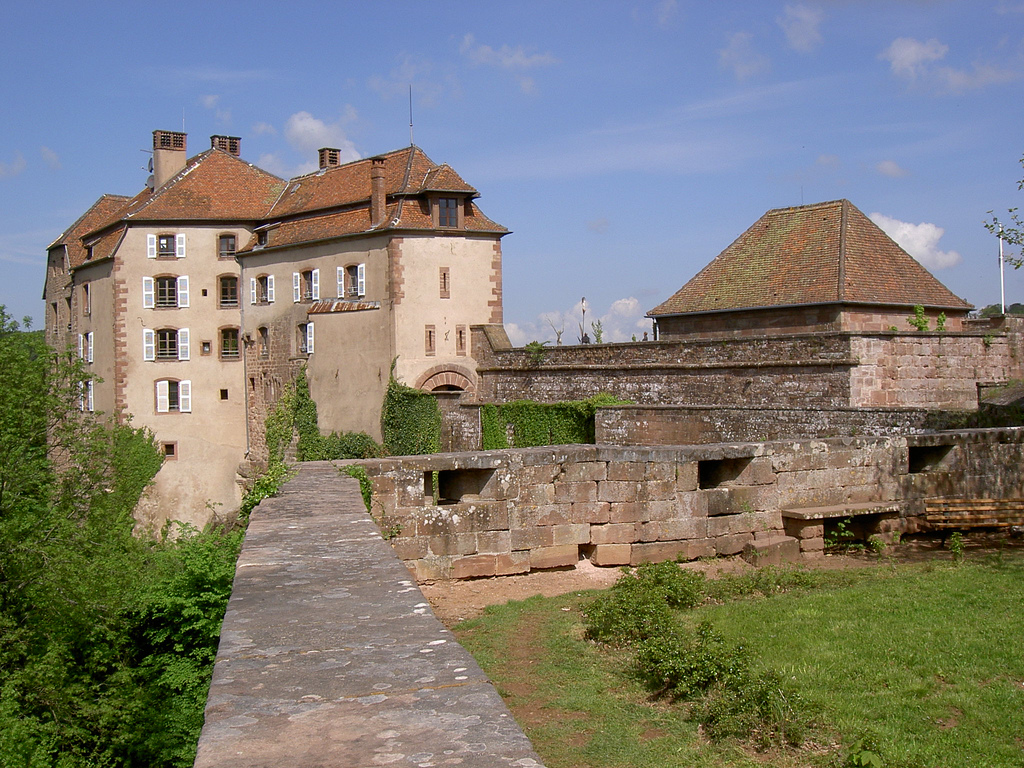

The castle is located at the end of a crest, separated from the old town by an artificial ditch dating from the beginning of the 13th century. The pentagonal keep was destroyed in the 19th century. The residence has been greatly altered but in its cellar the filtering cistern dates from the 14th century. On the southern façade are Romanesque windows. The well with Renaissance decoration, the main door with pilasters and the staircase turret date from the 16th century.

The polygonal construction exhibits Gothic ornamentation, in particular hooked capitals.

== See also ==
- List of castles in France
