= George Gustavus, Count Palatine of Veldenz =

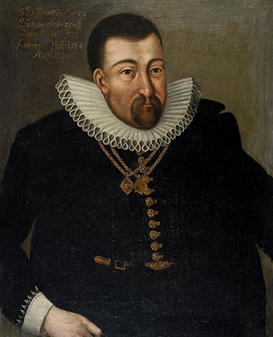
George Gustavus, Count Palatine of Veldenz.

George Gustavus (German: Georg Gustav) (6 February 1564 – 3 June 1634) was the Count of Veldenz from 1592 until 1634.

== Biography ==
George Gustavus was born in 1564 as the eldest son of George John I, Count Palatine of Lützelstein. His father died in 1592, and John Augustus and his brothers succeeded him under the regency of their mother Anna of Sweden. In 1598 the brothers partitioned the territories; George Gustavus retained the counties of Veldenz and Lautereck while his younger brothers obtained the other territories. In 1608, he founded Lixheim for Reformed refugees, but was also forced to sell the new town in 1623 to Henry II, Duke of Lorraine. He died in 1634 and was buried in Remigiusberg.

=== Marriage ===
George Gustavus married Duchess Elizabeth of Württemberg (3 March 1548 – 28 February 1592), daughter of Duke Christopher, on 30 October 1586. The marriage remained childless.

George Gustavus married Princess Maria Elizabeth of Palatinate-Zweibrücken (7 November 1581 – 18 August 1637), daughter of Duke John I, on 17 May 1601 and had the following children:

1. Anne Magdalena (19 March 1602 – 20 August 1630), married to Henry Wenceslaus, Duke of Oels-Bernstadt
2. John Frederick (12 January 1604 – 30 November 1632)
3. George Gustavus (17 August 1605 – 17 September 1605)
4. Elizabeth (18 March 1607 – 4 October 1608)
5. Charles Louis (5 February 1609 – 19 July 1631)
6. Wolfgang William (22 August 1610 – 27 January 1611)
7. Sophie Sybille (14 March 1612 – 12 July 1616)
8. Maria Elizabeth (24 June 1616 – 12 September 1649)
9. Maria Amalie (11 September 1621 – 10 December 1622)
10. Magdalena Sophie (29 November 1622 – 14 August 1691)
11. Leopold Louis (1 February 1625 – 29 September 1694)

Regnal titles
Preceded by George John I	Count of Veldenz; 1592 – 1634; With: John Augustus, Louis Philip & George John II (1592 – 1598)	Succeeded by Leopold Louis
