= Leopold Louis, Count Palatine of Veldenz =

German nobleman (1625–1694)

Leopold Louis
- Count Palatine of Veldenz
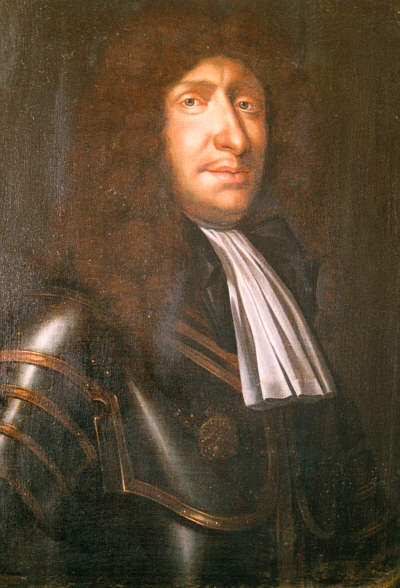
- Portrait of Leopold Louis

Count Palatine of Veldenz
- Reign: 1634–1694
- Predecessor: George Gustavus
- Successor: None (Veldenz passed to Palatinate-Kleeburg)
- Full name: Leopold Ludwig von Pfalz-Veldenz
- Born: 31 January 1625; Lauterecken
- Died: 29 September 1694 (aged 69); Strasbourg
- Family: House of Wittelsbach
- Spouse: Agatha Christina of Hanau-Lichtenberg
- Issue: Anna Sophie; Gustav Philip; Elisabeth Johanna; Karl George; Leopold Albert; Amalie Eleanor; Karl Philip; Anna Margaret; Anton Ulrich; Maria Anna; Dorothea; Elisabeth Louise
- Father: George Gustavus
- Mother: Maria Elisabeth of Palatinate-Zweibrücken

Leopold Louis (German: Leopold Ludwig) (1 February 1625 – 29 September 1694) was the Count of Veldenz from 1634 until 1694.

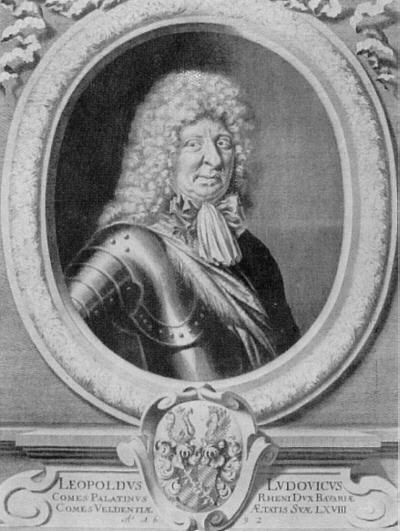
Leopold Louis, Count Palatine of Veldenz.

== Life ==
Leopold Louis was born in Lauterecken in 1625 as the youngest son of George Gustavus, Count Palatine of Veldenz, from his second marriage to Maria Elizabeth of Palatinate-Zweibrücken (7 November 1581 – 18 August 1637), daughter of Duke John I.

After his father's death in 1634, he succeeded him, as his elder brothers had already died. During the Thirty Years' War his lands were occupied, and again during the Nine Years' War by Swedish, Spanish and later French soldiers. Leopold Louis died in Strasbourg in 1694 as a poor man and was buried in Lützelstein (now called La Petite-Pierre, in France). As he had no surviving sons, the ruins of Veldenz were inherited by the Palatinate-Kleeburg line, the head of which was Charles XI, king of Sweden, in conflict with the nearer Electorate of Palatinate.

== Marriage ==
Leopold Louis married Agathe Christine, the youngest daughter of Count Philip Wolfgang of Hanau-Lichtenberg, on 4 Jul 1648 and had the following children:

1. unnamed daughter (1649)
2. Anne Sophie (20 May 1650 – 12 June 1706)
3. Gustav Philip (17 July 1651 – 24 August 1679)
4. Elisabeth Johanna (22 February 1653 – 5 February 1718)
5. Christine (29 March 1654 – 18 February 1655)
6. Christine Louise (11 November 1655 – 14 April 1656)
7. Christian Louis (5 October 1656 – 15 April 1658)
8. Dorothea (16 January 1658 – 17 August 1723)
9. Leopold Louis (14 March 1659 – 17 March 1660)
10. Charles George (27 May 1660 – 3 July 1686)
11. Agatha Eleanore (29 June 1662 – 1 January 1664)
12. Augustus Leopold (22 December 1663 – 9 September 1689)

Regnal titles
Preceded by George Gustavus	Count of Veldenz; 1634 – 1694	Succeeded by Charles I
