= Anna of Sweden (1545–1610) =

Princess Anna
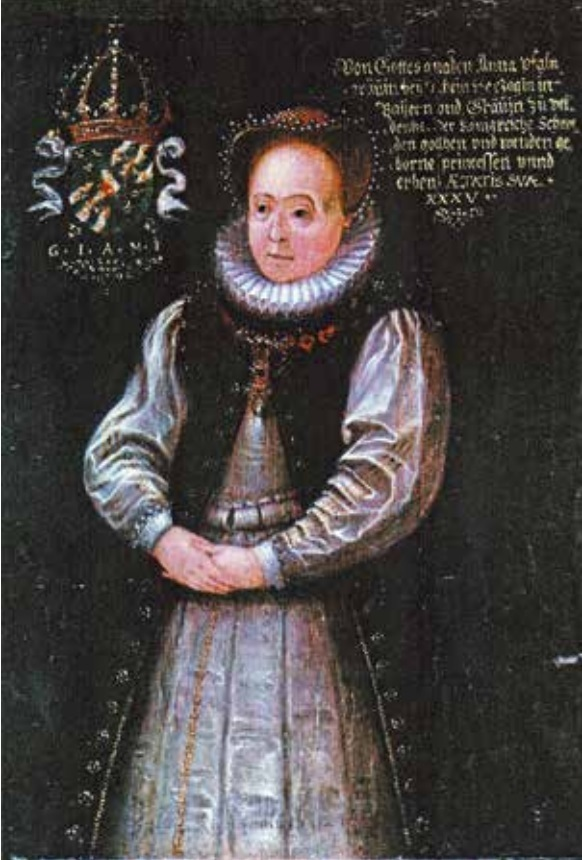
- Portrait of Anna according to the text on it

Countess Palatine of Veldenz
- Tenure: 1562–1592

Regent of Veldenz and Lautereck
- Regency: 1592–1598
- Born: 19 June 1545
- Died: 20 March 1610 (aged 64)
- Spouse: George John I, Count Palatine of Veldenz
- Issue: George Gustavus, Count Palatine of Veldenz; Anne Margaret of Palatinate-Veldenz; John Rupert; Anne Margaret, Countess Palatine of Simmern-Sponheim; Ursula, Duchess of Württemberg; Joanna Elizabeth; John Augustus, Count Palatine of Lützelstein; Louis Philip, Count Palatine of Guttenberg; Maria Anne; Catherine Ursula; George John II, Count Palatine of Lützelstein-Guttenberg
Names
- Anna; Swedish: Anna Gustavsdotter
- House: Vasa
- Father: Gustav I of Sweden
- Mother: Margaret Leijonhufvud

Princess Anna of Sweden (Swedish: Anna Gustavsdotter; 19 June 1545 – 20 March 1610), also known as Anna Maria and Anne Marie, was a Countess Palatine consort of Veldenz by marriage to George John I, Count Palatine of Veldenz. She served as Interim Regent from 1592 to 1598, and supervised the partition of the territories between her sons. She was the daughter of King Gustav I of Sweden and Queen Margaret.

== Biography ==
=== Early life ===
Very little is known about Anna's childhood. During her early childhood, she, as well as her siblings in the royal nursery, were primarily under the care of her mother the queen's trusted nurse, Brigitta Lars Anderssons, her mother's cousin lady Margareta and the noble widow Ingrid Amundsdotter. After the death of her mother in 1551, she as well as her siblings were placed in the care of Christina Gyllenstierna and then under her aunts Brita and Martha Leijonhufvud before her father's remarriage to Catherine Stenbock. They were then under the responsibility of their stepmother and, more precisely, the head-lady-in-waiting Anna Hogenskild. As her sisters, she was given a careful education, and tutored in foreign languages, particularly the German language.

In 1556, she and her sisters were given a dowry of 100.000 daler, had their portraits painted and their personal qualities described in Latin by the court poet Henricus Mollerus, and introduced on the Dynastic European marriage market. Several dynastic marriages where suggested from that point on. In 1559, a marriage was suggested between Anna and Louis VI, Elector Palatine or Poppo XII of Henneberg (1513–1574). After the scandal surrounding Princess Cecilia that year, Cecilia's main suitor George John I, Count Palatine of Veldenz, chose to direct his marriage negotiations toward Anna instead. The marriage was contracted because it could give George John I the needed funds (her dowry of 100.000 was larger than most German Princesses, who normally had 28.000 at the most), and because it could give the Swedish Royal House valuable contacts as George John I, though a petty ruler himself, was related with most of the German Princely Houses. The wedding was conducted at the Stockholm Royal Castle 20 December 1562. It was noted that Anna wore a crown of pearls and the king of Denmark was among the wedding guests.

Anna and George John I remained in Sweden for some time after the wedding to gather her great dowry. In 1563, the three princesses Cecilia, Anna and Sophia had sent a letter of protest to their brother king Eric XIV regarding his imprisonment of their brother John, something he had a very negative reaction to. The couple finally left Sweden for Germany in July 1563, and settled in Lauterecken in Veldenz.

=== Countess Palatine ===
The marriage is described as a happy one, and Anna reportedly acted as the adviser of George John, trying to use her influence to restrain his many adventurous and expensive projects. During the journey of her brother Charles in Germany in 1577, he was suspected by their brother John III to conspiring against him, and Anna acted as a mediator. In 1578–79, she also participated in the negotiations between Duke Charles and Maria of Palatinate-Simmern.

George John used Anna's great fortune to finance an expensive court life and ruinous speculations, and accumulated debts which ruined her fortune and the economy of the state, often by taking loans to pay other loans. One of the most costly expenses was the foundation of the city of Pfalzburg (1570) in Northern Alsace and where their court often resided in the Château de La Petite-Pierre (Lützelstien). In 1579, her dowry was evidently wasted, as she and her spouse could not afford to attend the wedding between her brother Charles and Maria of Palatinate-Simmern in accordance with their status.

Anna was often assigned by George John to act as mediator in his business affairs: in 1588, she was given the task by him to persuade Charles III, Duke of Lorraine to prolong his chance to buy back the city of Pfalzburg, which he had previously sold to Lorraine with the right to buy it back, so that he might have the time to loan money to buy it back in time. Anna successfully persuaded the Duke of Lorraine to prolong George John's right to buy Pfalzburg back, but it finally became a part of Lorraine in 1590.

=== Regency and later life ===
Upon the death of George John in April 1592, the state was bankrupt and the interests of her late husband's debts was greater than the entire state income: he left a debt of 300.000 florines, and she spent the rest of her life trying to repay it. In parallel with this, the state also faced political turmoil, as George John had divided the areas of the state between their sons, which resulted in an inheritance feud between the sons which made the realm impossible to govern.

In order to solve the inheritance dispute between her son about the lands of the state, Anna acted as mediator, and administered the undivided territories as effective regent for six years from 1592 until the dispute could finally be solved, and the lands peacefully divided between the sons.

In order to solve the debt problems, Anna dissolved the court and lived in the household of her brothers-in-law until she could afford to have her own household again: she also entered negotiations with her brother Charles IX and queen dowager Gunilla Bielke in order to be given the Swedish funds which she managed to have John III promise to send her before his death.

Anna did not managed to convince her brother Charles IX to participate in her regency, but she cooperated very well with her co-regents, Ernst Philip of Baden and her brothers-in-law Rickard of Simmern and Louis of Württemberg, and successfully managed to solve the problems her regency faced. In 1592, she threatened the Duke of Lorraine with Swedish intervention if he did not stop his son from warring the areas around in Lützelstein. In 1598, Anna successfully made sure that her eldest son Georg Gustav was secured the control of Veldenz, and her younger son Johan August was given full control of Lützelstein, before she retired from power.

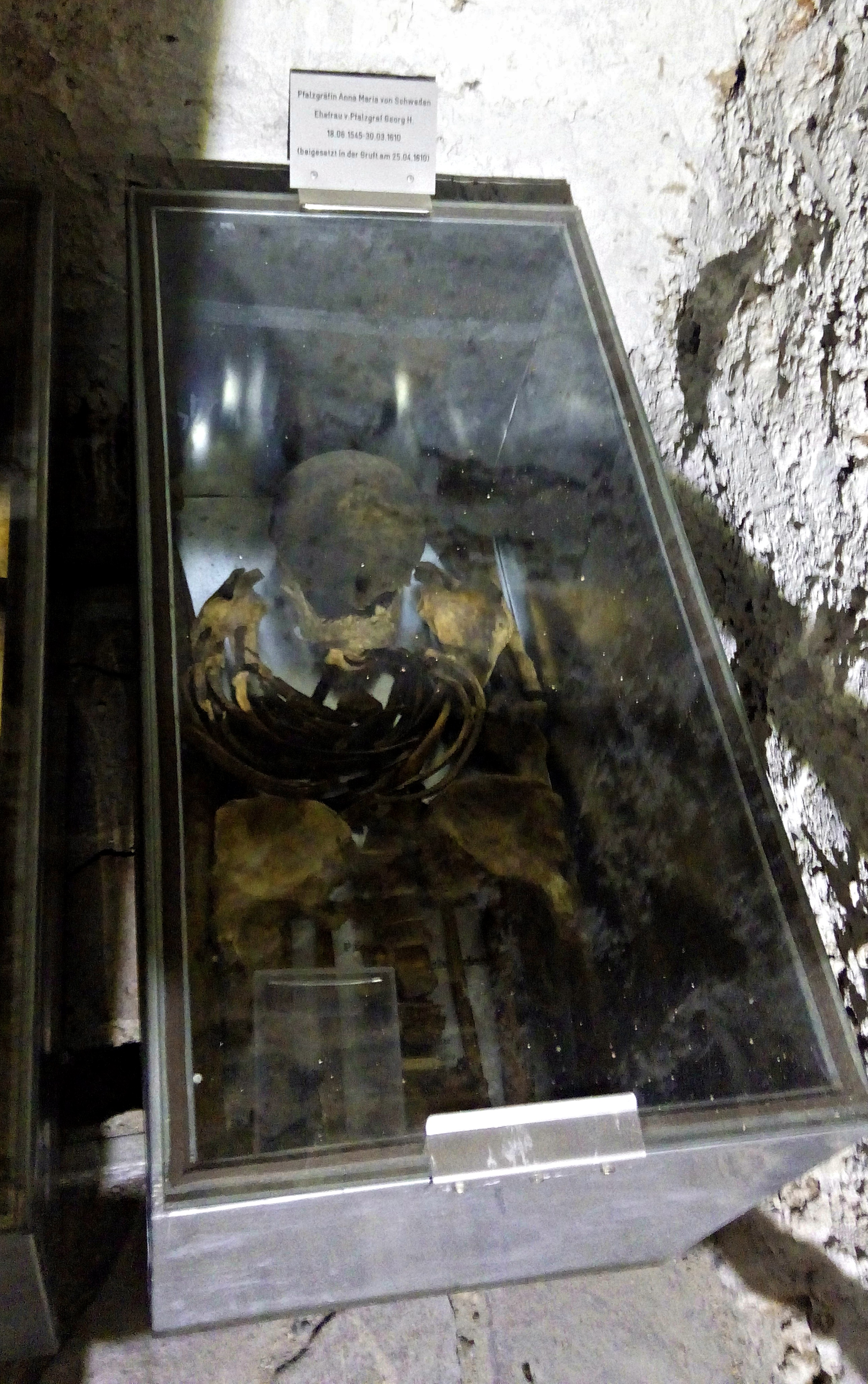
Anna's grave in Haschbach am Remigiusberg (with a sign calling her Anna Maria)

She spent her retirement after regency on her dower residence in Lauterecken and Remigiusberg. In her will, she donated a large sum with an income to be divided among the poor annually.

Anna was described as a faithful and dutiful, compassionate and cooperative but also firm: she was afforded to recognition of having successfully solved an extremely difficult situation during her regency because of her personal qualities and by emphasizing her status an authority as the central figure and matriarch of the dynasty. She was popular and respected in Veldenz, where she was affectionately referred to as "Mother Anna".

== Family ==
She married Georg Johann, the Count Palatine of Veldenz on 20 December 1562. The couple had the following issue:

1. George Gustavus, Count Palatine of Veldenz (6 February 1564 – 3 June 1634)
2. Anne Margaret of Palatinate-Veldenz (28 April 1565 – 2 October 1566)
3. John Rupert of Palatinate-Veldenz (9 September 1566 – 1 October 1567)
4. Anne Margaret of Palatinate-Veldenz (17 January 1571 – 1 November 1621); married Count Palatine Richard of Simmern-Sponheim
5. Ursula of Palatinate-Veldenz (24 February 1572 – 5 March 1635); married Louis III, Duke of Württemberg
6. Joanna Elizabeth of Palatinate-Veldenz (2 October 1573 – 28 July 1601)
7. John Augustus, Count Palatine of Lützelstein (26 November 1575 – 18 September 1611)
8. Louis Philip, Count Palatine of Guttenberg (24 November 1577 – 24 October 1601)
9. Maria Anne of Palatinate-Veldenz (9 June 1579 – 10 October 1579)
10. Catherine Ursula of Palatinate-Veldenz (3 August 1582 – 22 January 1595)
11. George John II, Count Palatine of Lützelstein-Guttenberg (24 June 1586 – 29 September 1654)

== Ancestry ==
Ancestors of Anna of Sweden (1545–1610)

Johan Kristiersson (Vasa)
Erik Johansson (Vasa)
Birgitta Gustafsdotter (Sture)
Gustav I of Sweden (Vasa)
Måns Karlsson (Eka)
Cecilia Månsdotter (Eka)
Sigrid Eskilsdotter (Banér)
Anna of Sweden (Vasa)
Abraham Kristiernsson (Leijonhuvud)
Erik Abrahamsson (Leijonhufvud)
Birgitta Månsdotter (Natt och Dag)
Margareta Leijonhufvud
Erik Karlsson (Vasa)
Ebba Eriksdotter (Vasa)
Anna Karlsdotter (Vinstorpa)
