= John Augustus, Count Palatine of Lützelstein =

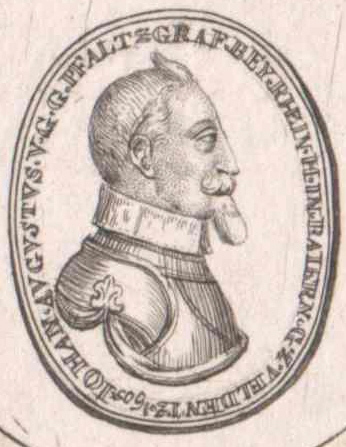
Johann August, Count Palatine of Lützelstein.

John Augustus (German: Johann August) (26 November 1575 – 18 September 1611) was the co-Duke of Veldenz from 1592 until 1598 and the Duke of Lützelstein from 1598 until 1611.

== Life ==
John Augustus was born in 1575 as the second surviving son of George John I, Count Palatine of Lützelstein. His father died in 1592, and John Augustus and his brothers succeeded him under the regency of their mother Anna of Sweden. In 1598 the brothers partitioned the territories; John Augustus received Palatinate-Lützelstein. John Augustus died in Castle Lemberg in 1611 and was buried in Lützelstein. He was succeeded by his younger brother George John.

== Marriage ==
John Augustus married Anne Elizabeth of the Electorate of the Palatinate (23 June 1549 – 20 September 1609), daughter of the Elector Frederick III, in 1599. The marriage remained childless.

Regnal titles
Preceded by George John I	Duke of Veldenz; 1592 – 1598; With: George Gustavus, Louis Philip & George John II	Duchy divided
New title	Duke of Lützelstein; 1598 – 1611	Succeeded by George John II
