= George John I, Count Palatine of Veldenz =

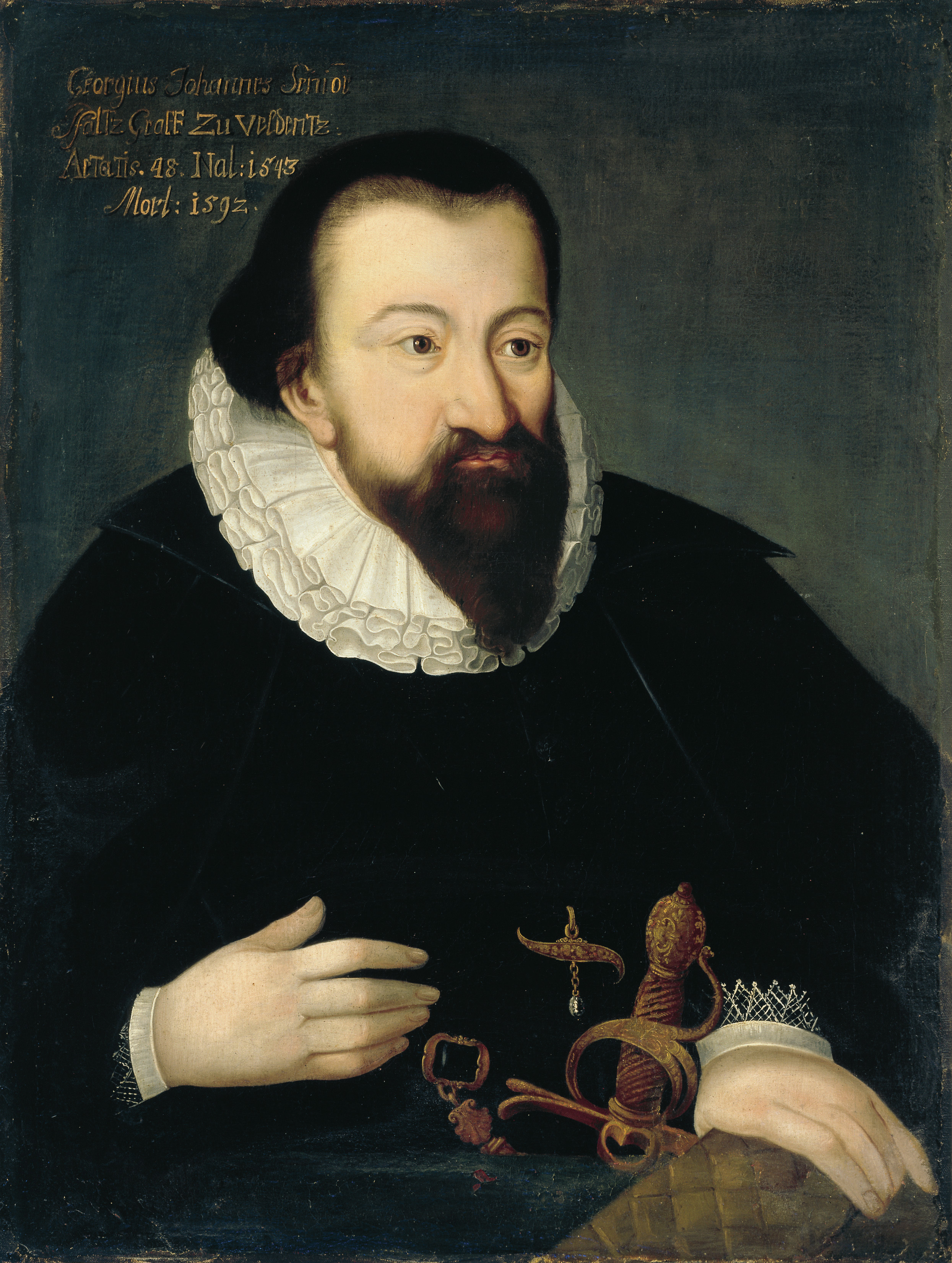
- Born: 11 April 1543
- Died: 18 April 1592 (aged 49); Lützelstein
- Noble family: House of Wittelsbach
- Spouse: Anna of Sweden
- Issue: George Gustavus; John Augustus; Louis Philip; George John
- Father: Rupert, Count Palatine of Veldenz
- Mother: Ursula of Salm-Kyrburg

George John I (German: Georg Johann I.; sometimes called George Hans) (11 April 1543 – 18 April 1592) was the Count of Veldenz from 1544 until 1592.

== Life ==
George John was born in 1543 as the only son of Rupert, Count Palatine of Veldenz. George John's cousin, Wolfgang, Count Palatine of Zweibrücken, was a child when he inherited his title, so George John's father served as Wolgang's regent. In 1543, when Wolfgang reached majority and took on the responsibility of office, he enacted the Marburg Contract, giving Rupert the County of Veldenz. Rupert died the following year, and the one-year-old George John succeeded him.

In 1563 he married Anna of Sweden, the daughter of King Gustav I of Sweden, beginning a long-running connection between the Electorate of the Palatinate and Sweden. In 1553 after the Heidelberg War of Succession which regulated the mutual inheritance of all the lines of the House of Wittelsbach, George John obtained Palatinate-Lützelstein. He attempted to develop his Alsatian territories to be the focus of his state, which led to him building the city of Phalsbourg (Pfalzburg) in 1570 and populating it with Protestant refugees from the Duchy of Lorraine. The project was so grand and unaffordable that in 1583 he was forced to sell the city and half of Palatinate-Lützelstein to Lorraine.

George John died in Lützelstein in 1592 and was buried in the city's church.

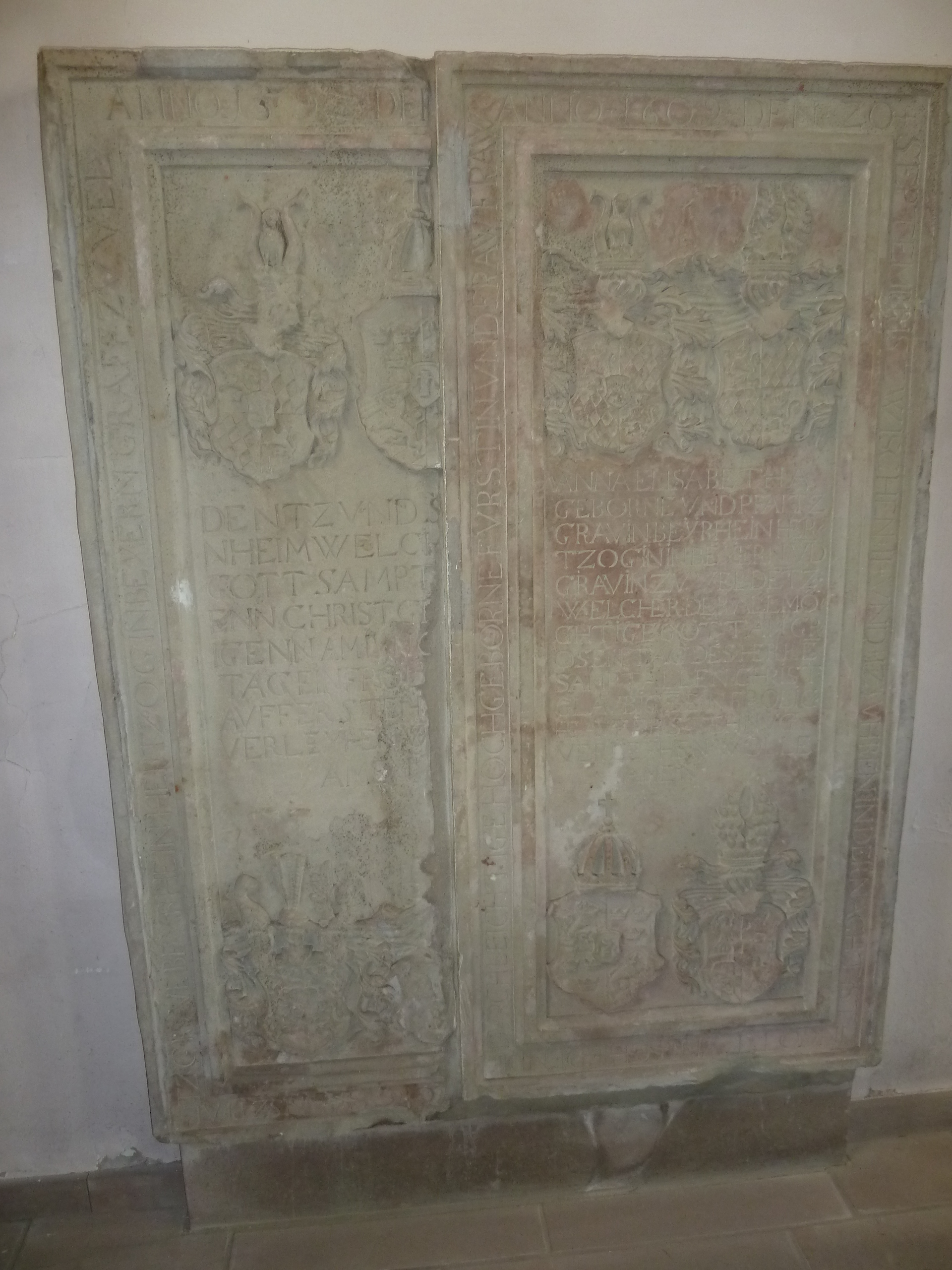
Gravestone of George John of Veldenz

== Marriage ==
George John married Princess Anna of Sweden (1545–1610), daughter of King Gustavus I, in 1563 and had the following children:

1. George Gustavus (1564 – 3 June 1634)
2. Anne Margaret (28 April 1565 – 2 October 1566)
3. John Rupert (9 September 1566 – 1 October 1567)
4. Anne Margaret (17 January 1571 – 1 November 1621) third wife of Reichard, Count Palatine of Simmern-Sponheim
5. Ursula (24 February 1572 – 5 March 1635), second wife of Louis III, Duke of Württemberg
6. Joanna Elizabeth (2 October 1573 – 28 July 1601)
7. John Augustus (26 November 1575 – 18 September 1611)
8. Louis Philip (24 November 1577 – 24 October 1601)
9. Maria Anne (9 June 1579 – 10 October 1579)
10. Catherine Ursula (3 August 1582 – 22 January 1595)
11. George John (24 June 1586 – 29 September 1654)

== Ancestors ==
Ancestors of George John I, Count Palatine of Veldenz

16. Stephen, Count Palatine of Simmern-Zweibrücken
8. Louis I, Count Palatine of Zweibrücken
17. Anna of Veldenz
4. Alexander, Count Palatine of Zweibrücken
18. Antoine I of Croÿ
9. Johanna of Croÿ
19. Margaret of Lorraine-Vaudémont
2. Rupert, Count Palatine of Veldenz
20. Kraft V of Hohenlohe-Weikersheim
10. Kraft VI, Count of Hohenlohe-Weikersheim
21. Margaret of Oettingen
5. Margarete of Hohenlohe-Neuenstein
22. Ulrich V, Count of Württemberg
11. Helen of Württemberg
23. Margaret of Savoy
1. George John I, Count Palatine of Veldenz
24. John V, Wild- and Rhinegrave of Dhaun-Kyrburg
12. John VI, Wild- and Rhinegrave of Dhaun-Kyrburg
25. Johanette of Salm
6. John VII, Wild- and Rhinegrave of Dhaun-Kyrburg
26. Nicholas of Moers-Saarwerden
13. Joanna of Moers-Saarwerden
27. Barbara of Vinstingen-Schwanenhals
3. Ursula of Salm-Kyrburg
28. Louis II, Count of Isenburg-Büdingen
14. Philip, Count of Isenburg-Ronneburg
29. Maria of Nassau-Wiesbaden-Idstein
7. Amma of Isenburg-Büdingen
30. Philip II, Count of Rieneck
15. Amalia of Rieneck
31. Anna of Wertheim

== See also ==
- Château de La Petite-Pierre, castle which became his residence in 1566 and which he heavily rebuilt.

Regnal titles
Preceded by Rupert	Count of Veldenz; 1544 – 1592	Succeeded by George Gustavus
Preceded by Wolfgang	Count of Lützelstein; 1553 – 1592	Succeeded by John Augustus
Preceded by Wolfgang	Count of Lützelstein; 1553 – 1592	Succeeded by Louis Philip
Preceded by Wolfgang	Count of Lützelstein; 1553 – 1592	Succeeded by George John II
