= County Palatine of Veldenz =

State in the Holy Roman Empire

County Palatine of Veldenz Grafschaft Veldenz (German)
- 1112–1797
- Arms of the counts palatine of Veldenz

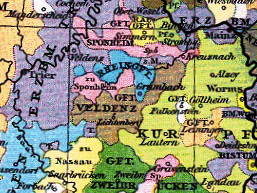
- Veldenz c. 1400
- Status: State of the Holy Roman Empire
- Capital: Veldenz
- Common languages: Moselle Franconian
- Government: County
- Historical era: Middle Ages
  - Established: 1112
  - Counts of Veldenz-Geroldseck: 1277
  - Inherited by House of Palatinate-Zweibrücken: 1444
  - Joined Upper Rhenish Circle: 1500
  - Counts of Palatinate-Veldenz: 1543
  - To Palatinate-Zweibrücken: 1694
  - Annexed by the French First Republic: 1797
Preceded by	Succeeded by
Rhenish Franconia	Sarre (department)

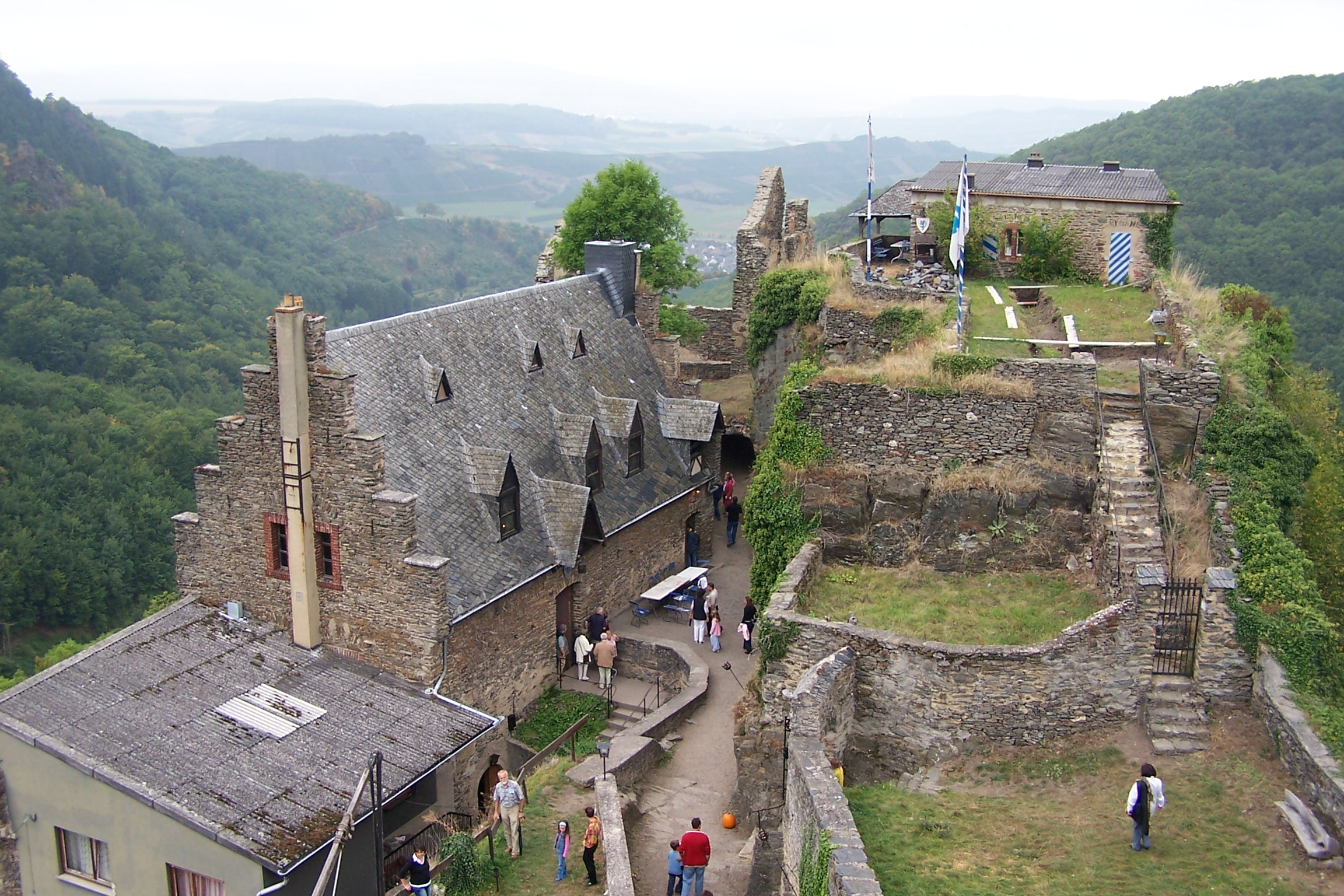
Schloss Veldenz 2005

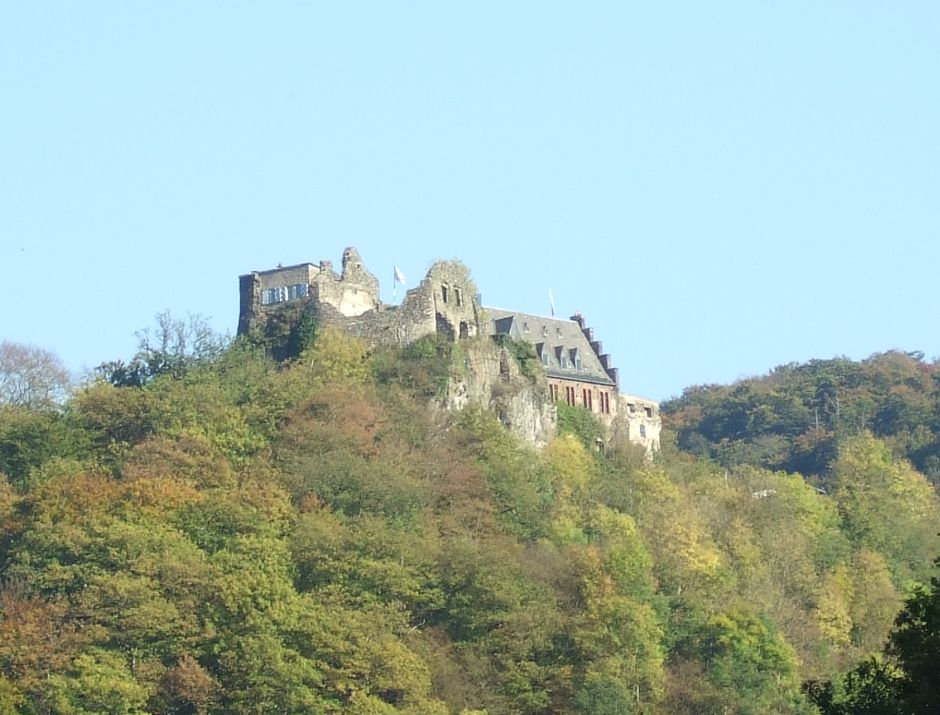
Schloss Veldenz, 2007

The County Palatine of Veldenz was a principality in the contemporary Land Rhineland-Palatinate with full voting rights to the Reichstag. The county was located partially between Kaiserslautern, Sponheim and Zweibrücken, partially on the Mosel in the Archbishopric of Trier. A municipality of the same name, Veldenz, and a castle, Schloss Veldenz, are located in the district of Bernkastel-Wittlich.

== History ==
The Counts of Veldenz separated from the Wildgraves of Kyrburg and Schmidburg family in 1112. The direct male line of the first comital house ceased in 1260 with the death of Gerlach V of Veldenz and his daughter Agnes of Veldenz inherited the county in 1260. Her husband Heinrich of Geroldseck became the founder of the second line of Counts of Veldenz or the House of Veldenz-Geroldseck (Hohengeroldseck).

In 1444 the county came under the rule of Stephen, Count Palatine of Simmern-Zweibrücken by his marriage to Anna of Veldenz, the only heiress of Count Frederick III of Veldenz. As of 1532, the entire County Palantine of Zweibrücken passed to the child Wolfgang. In 1543, when Wolfgang reached majority and took on the responsibilities of office, he enacted the Marburg Contract, giving his uncle Rupert, who had served as his regent and guardian for 11 years, the County of Veldenz.

When Rupert died in 1544, son George John succeeded him as Count Palatine of Veldenz. George married Anna Maria of Sweden, a daughter of Gustav I of Sweden, in 1563. This was the joining of the House of Wittelsbach with the Swedish Vasa royal family which was strengthened by a further marriage when Johann Casimir of Pfalz-Zweibrücken married Catharina of Sweden, a sister of Gustavus Adolphus in the 17th century. Wolfgang had in 1553 with the Heidelberg Succession agreement regulated the mutual inheritance of all Wittelsbach lines reaching from Veldenz-Palatinate to the county Lützelstein in Alsace. The grandson of Georg Hans, Leopold Ludwig von Lützelstein, died in 1694 as a poor man without legitimate offspring and the county-Palatinate of Veldenz, which was in ruins after many French attacks, reverted to the Zweibrücken line, specifically King of Sweden Charles XI, who ruled in personal union with the duchy of Palatine Zweibrücken. However, the bordering Electoral Palatinate also wanted the ruins, which they obtained in 1733.

In 1801 it was incorporated into the Saardepartement of the First French Empire. The Congress of Vienna, 1815, gave the smaller part of the county lying on the Mosel to Prussia and the remainder to Bavaria.

== Counts of Veldenz ==
=== First Veldenz Line ===
- Emicho, Count of Kyrburg and Schmidburg (1086–1113)
- Gerlach I, Count of Veldenz (1113–1146)
- Gerlach II, Count of Veldenz (1146–1186)
- Gerlach III, Count of Veldenz (1186–1214)
- Gerlach IV, Count of Veldenz (1214–1254)
- Gerlach V, Count of Veldenz (1254–1260)
- Agnes, Countess of Veldenz (1260–1277)

=== Veldenz-Geroldseck Line ===
- Henry, Count of Geroldseck (1277–1298) ∞ Agnes of Veldenz (1258–?)
- Walter, Count of Veldenz (1298–1327)
- George I, Count of Veldenz (1327–1347)
- Henry II, Count of Veldenz (1347–1378)
- Frederick II, Count of Veldenz (1378–1396)
- Henry III, Count of Veldenz (1378–1389)
- Henry IV, Count of Veldenz (1389–1393)
- Frederick III, Count of Veldenz (1393–1444)

=== House of Wittelsbach ===
==== Palatine Zweibrücken Line ====
- Stephen (briefly in 1444), widower of Anna of Veldenz (died 1439, daughter of Frederick III), separated Veldenz from his other holdings and gave it to his younger son
- Louis (1444–1489)
- Alexander (1489–1514)
- Louis II (1514–1532)
- Wolfgang (1532–1543). Wolfgang rewarded his uncle and regent, Rupert, with Veldenz. Wolfgang's other counties and duchies were split amongst his own sons upon his death in 1569.

==== Palatine Veldenz Line ====
- Rupert, Count Palatine of Veldenz (1543–1544)
- George John I, Count Palatine of Veldenz (1544–1592)
- George Gustavus, Count Palatine of Veldenz (1592–1634)
- Leopold Louis, Count Palatine of Veldenz (1634–1694), died without heir, Veldenz reabsorbed by the Palatine Zweibrücken line (King of Sweden Charles XI)

=== Veldenz ruins ===
Sweden and the Palatinate disputed the Veldenz ruins for years. When the personal union of Sweden and Zweibrücken ended and following agreements among the Wittelsbach family, Veldenz went to the bordering Electoral Palatinate in 1733.

== Literature ==
- (in German) Crollius, Georg Christian: Vorlesung: Von dem ersten geschlecht der alten graven von Veldenz und dessen gemeinschaftlichen abstammung mit den ältern Wildgraven von den graven im Nohgau. Historia et Commentationes. Academiae Electoralis Scientiarvm et Elegantiorvm Litterarvm Theodoro-Palatinae. Mannhemii Typis Academicis 1770 (complete at Google Books)
- (in German) Crollius, Georg Christian: Vorlesung: von dem zweiten geschlechte der grafen von Veldenz, aus dem hause der herren von Geroldseck in der Ortenau. Historia et Commentationes. Academiae Electoralis Scientiarvm et Elegantiorvm Litterarvm Theodoro-Palatinae. Mannhemii Typis Academicis 1778 (complete at Google Books)
- (in German) Gerbert, Martin: Pragmatische Geschichte des Hauses Geroldsek, wie auch derer Reichsherrschaften Hohengeroldsek, Lahr und Mahlberg in Schwaben. Frankfurt und Leipzig 1766 (complete at Google Books)
