= Ricfried =

- Bishop of Utrecht
- Church: Catholic Church
- Diocese: Archdiocese of Utrecht
- In office: 806–815/816

Personal details
- Died: 815/816

Ricfried was Bishop of Utrecht between 806 and 815/816.

It is suspected that he was related to his successors Frederick, Alberik II, Ludger and Balderic. Nothing is known about his reign. He was buried in the St. Salvator Church in Utrecht.

Preceded by Hamacarus	Bishop of Utrecht; 806-ca. 815	Succeeded by Frederick of Utrecht
