= Liudger of Utrecht =

Luidger
- Bishop of Utrecht
- Church: Catholic Church
- Diocese: Archdiocese of Utrecht
- In office: 848–854

Personal details
- Died: 854

Liudger or Ludger was Bishop of Utrecht from around 848 to ca. 854.

Ludger was probably related to several other bishops of Utrecht from the ninth and tenth centuries, including his predecessor Alberik II. That this family was not averse to nepotism is shown in a certificate from 850, which showed that an uncle of Ludger called Baldric was planning to found a chapter that would be led by Ludger, according to a structure that would give clear advantages to their family. Ludger was also supposed to be succeeded by a close relative called Kraft, but he declined the seat because he was afraid that his personal wealth would attract Viking raids. Ludger was buried in the St. Salvator Church in Utrecht.

Preceded by Eginhard	Bishop of Utrecht ca. 848-854	Succeeded by Saint Hunger
