= Bernlef =

Frisian bard (died 809)

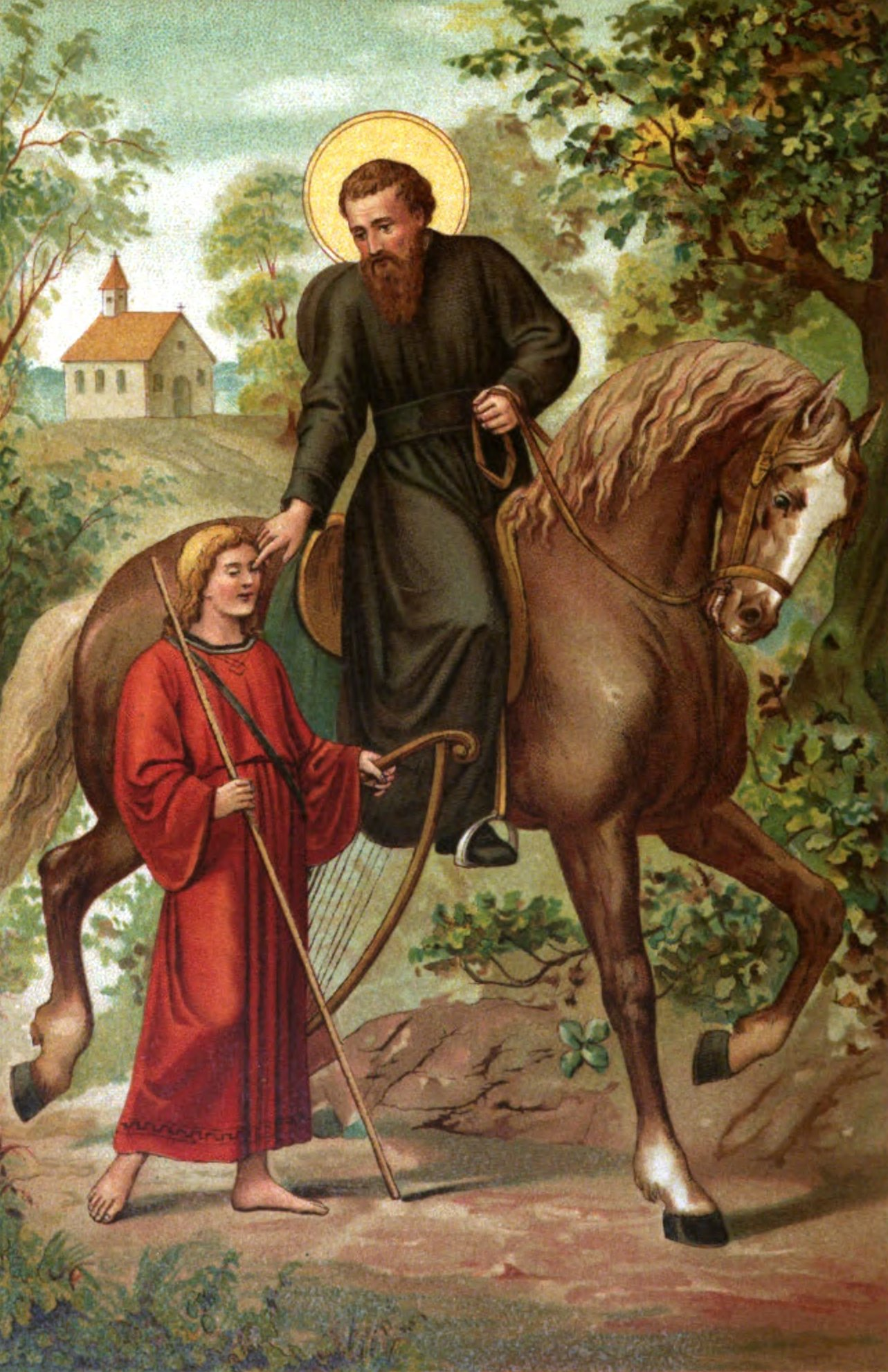
- An early 20th-century painting of Saint Ludger on a horse, healing Bernlef of his blindness
- Died: 809

Bernlef (Latin: Bernlevus; d. 809) was a Frisian bard and convert to Christianity. During his life, he traveled through the coastal regions of Frisia, singing epics about Frisian kings and heroes. According to tradition, he was healed of his blindness by Saint Ludger who then taught him to play the Psalms on his harp instead. When Ludger was forced to leave by the Saxons during their persecution of Christians, he called on Bernlef to evangelize to the Frisian people and baptize infants who were likely to die shortly.

== Biography ==
Bernlef was born in the 8th century. During his life, he traveled the coast throughout Frisia, between what is now the Dutch provinces of Groningen and Friesland, singing laudatory poems about the wars, heroes, and kings of Frisia while he played his harp. Sometime around the turn of the 9th century, he was converted to Christianity by Saint Ludger. Bernlef died in 809.

Much of what is known about Bernlef's life comes from Vita Sancti Liudigeri ('The Life of Saint Ludger'), a hagiography by his relative Saint Altfrid, which is compiled with three other accounts written by monks at the monastery established by Ludger in Werden: the Vita secunda ('The Life [of Saint Ludger] the Second [Version]'), Vita tertia ('The Life [of Saint Ludger] the Third [Version]'), and Vita rythmica ('The Life [of Saint Ludger, written in] Verse'). These works were compiled by monks from other copies of the story, except the Vita rythmica, which is partially from oral tradition as well.

According to W. Moll's Kerkgeschiedenis van Nederland vóór de Hervorming ('Church History of the Netherlands before the Reformation'), Bernlef and his wife resided in Holwert near Dokkum and traveled during the winter months to sing songs where he was held in high esteem by listeners. Over time, Bernlef had become blind and his wife invited Ludger into their home as he passed through Holwert to proselytize, hearing of his good works in the south. Traditionally ascribed to a miracle, Bernlef's blindness was cured by Ludger. Some versions of the story relate that Bernlef doubted Ludger's Christian message by saying "If your God is so powerful, show me a sign." Thereafter, Ludger placed his hands on Bernlef's eyes and with a prayer healed his blindness. Other versions say that he confessed his sins to Ludger and was healed. After regaining his sight, Bernlef learned to play the Psalms on his harp from Ludger, forgoing the bellicose poetry from his earlier days and evangelizing to the Frisian people. When Ludger was expelled from the area by the Saxons, he charged Bernlef with continuing the evangelizing mission and the baptism of believers, particularly baptizing children who were in poor health and likely to die. Bernlef had eighteen children, only two of whom survived. Both of the surviving children were confirmed by Ludger. Bernlef held to his faith during the Saxon persecution of Christians and died in old age. On his deathbed, he comforted his wife by saying that they would not be separated for long if his prayers were answered and she died fifteen days later.

Some of what has been written about Bernlef is subject to debate. For example, J. G. R. Acquoy disputed W. Moll's recounting of Bernlef's life, stating that although Moll was "otherwise so precise a historian, [he] unconsciously formed the legend of the Psalm-singing Bernlef". Acquoy points to several sections of the Vita Sancti Liudgeri where Moll appears to take artistic license, which may have been truthful but are not found in the source Moll purported to have found it. For example, Moll writes that Bernlef "was a welcome guest on winter evenings far and wide by free commoners in the area", but Acquoy cites the original Vita Sancti Liudgeri, which only holds that he was held in high esteem by his neighbors. The Vita secunda only writes that he was "loved intensely by the plain and the wealthy", which is copied by the Vita tertia, and nothing of this is mentioned in the Vita rythmica. Acquoy also notes that Moll later reported that he had gotten the town Bernlef was from wrong; Bernlef was actually from Holwierde near Delfzijl, not Holwert near Dokkum.

== Legacy ==
Bernlef has been considered as a possible author of the Heliand, an Old Saxon religious poem. Although none of his work has survived, some Frisians consider him to be the first poet, though critics such as Coen Peppelenbos have criticized this notion, saying that "Friesland has wrongly hijacked him as the first poet".

The Dutch poet Hendrik Jan Marsman used the pen name "J. Bernlef" after the blind bard.

== Gallery ==
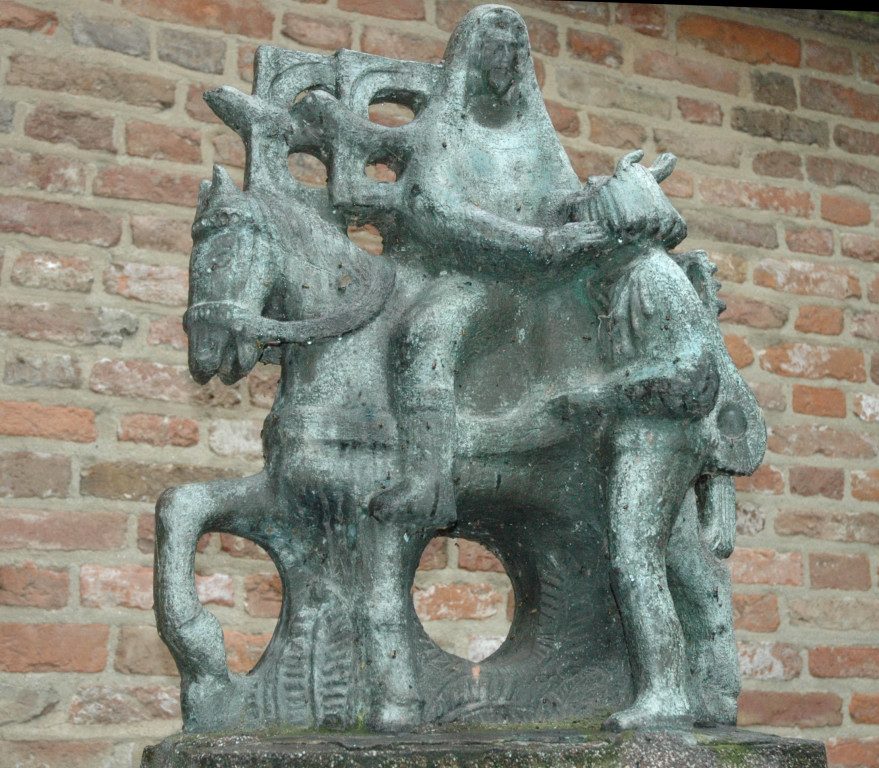
A statue commemorating Bernlef's healing by Henk Carlier

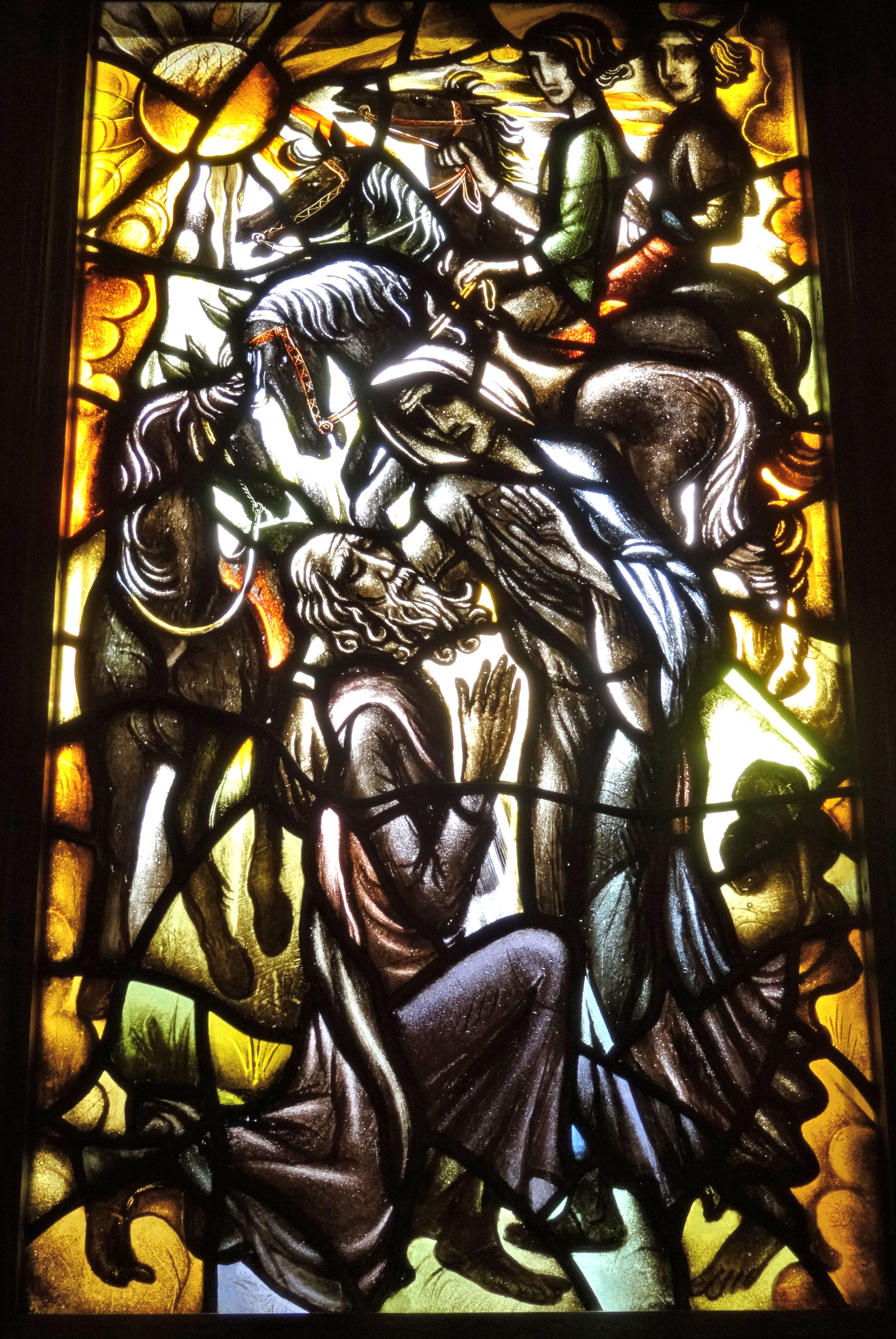
A stained-glass window at the University of Groningen depicting Bernlef and Ludger

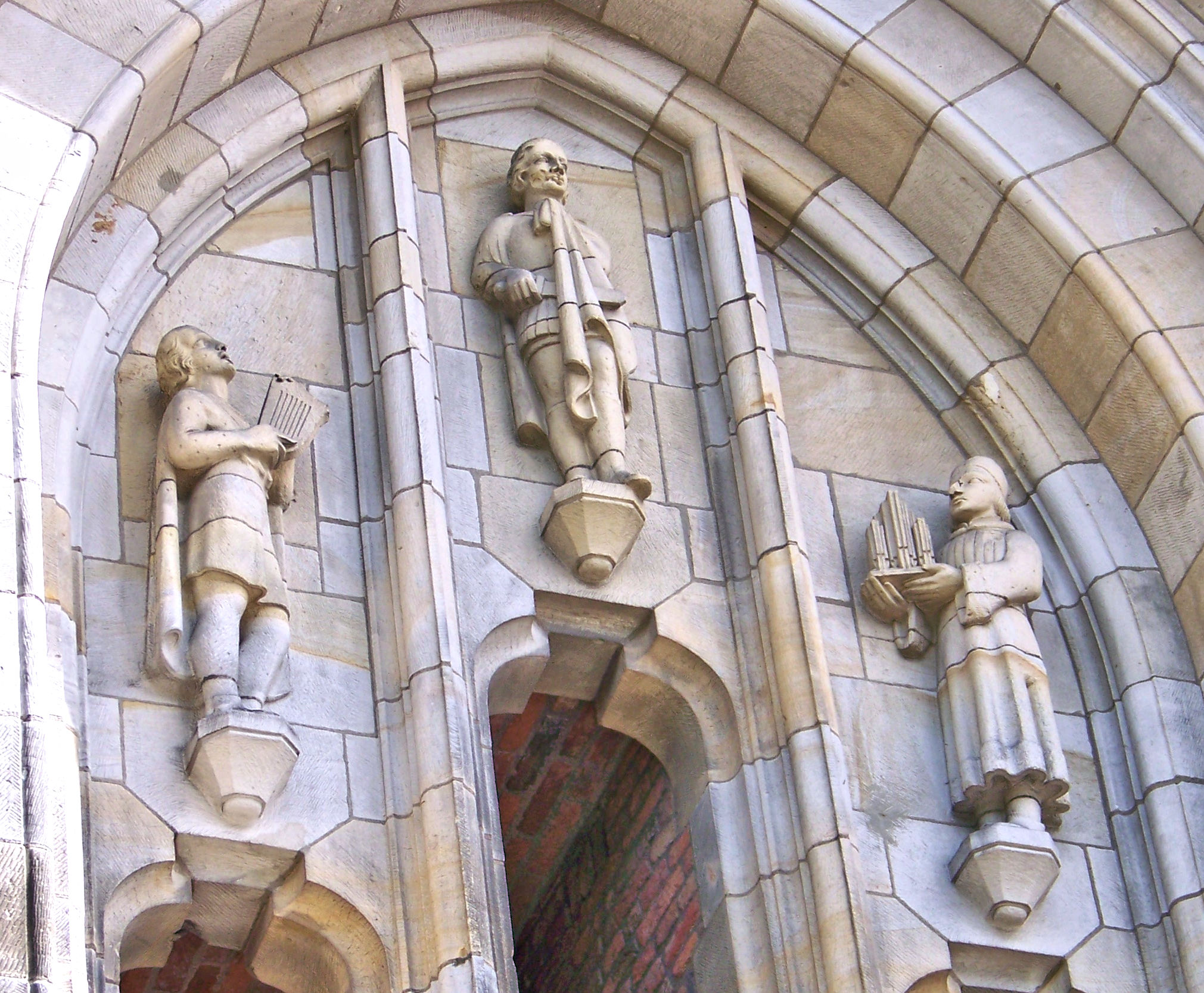
Bernlef (left) on the façade of the Martinitoren holding his harp, sculpted by Willem Valk in 1940

== See also ==
- Christianization of the Germanic peoples
- Frisian–Frankish wars
