= Alberic I of Utrecht =

Alberic of Utrecht

Bishop
- Died: 21 August 784
- Venerated in: Roman Catholic Church, Eastern Orthodox Church
- Feast: 14 November

Saint Alberic of Utrecht, Dutch: Alberik I van Utrecht, (died 21 August 784) was a Benedictine monk and bishop of Utrecht, in what is today the Netherlands.

== Life ==
Alberic was the nephew of Saint Gregory of Utrecht. Little is known of Alberic before he joined the Order of Saint Benedict. It is known that he served as prior of the Monastery of Saint Martin in Utrecht. When Gregory died in 775, Alberic succeeded his uncle in administering the diocese of Utrecht.^{[a]} He later traveled to Cologne where he was consecrated Bishop of Utrecht.

Alberic strove to deepen the faith of his faithful who still preserved many pagan traditions. His bishopric was noted for the success of its mission among the pagan Teutons, as well as the reorganization of the school of Utrecht. In addition, Alberic directed the mission of Ludger in Ostergau.

Alberic was a good friend of Alcuin, a teacher and poet from York, England, preeminent among the scholars of that era. This relationship likely speaks to Alberic's own intelligence, as the saint has been noted for his "encyclopedic knowledge of the faith."

== Notes ==
1. Although sources state that Alberic succeeded his uncle to the see of Utrecht, Gregory was not a bishop, but in fact an "administrator," an abbot. It is, however, certain that Alberic was a bishop, since he was consecrated at Cologne in 777.

Preceded by Gregory of Utrecht	Bishop of Utrecht; 775–784	Succeeded by Theodard of Utrecht
