= Alberic II =

Alberic II may refer to:

- Alberic II of Utrecht (d. 844), bishop
- Alberic II of Spoleto (d. 954), prince of Rome
- Alberic II, Count of Dammartin (d. 1183)
