= Eginhard (bishop) =

Bishop of Utrecht

- Bishop of Utrecht
- Church: Catholic Church
- Diocese: Utrecht
- In office: 845–848
- Predecessor: Alberik II
- Successor: Liudger

Eginhard, also Egihard, was Bishop of Utrecht from around 845 to 848.

All that is known of Eginhard is an immunity certificate given by emperor Lothair I from 21 March 845, in which he is mentioned as bishop of Utrecht

Preceded by Alberik II	Bishop of Utrecht; 845–848	Succeeded by Liudger
