= Kaufmannskirche =

- Merchant's Church
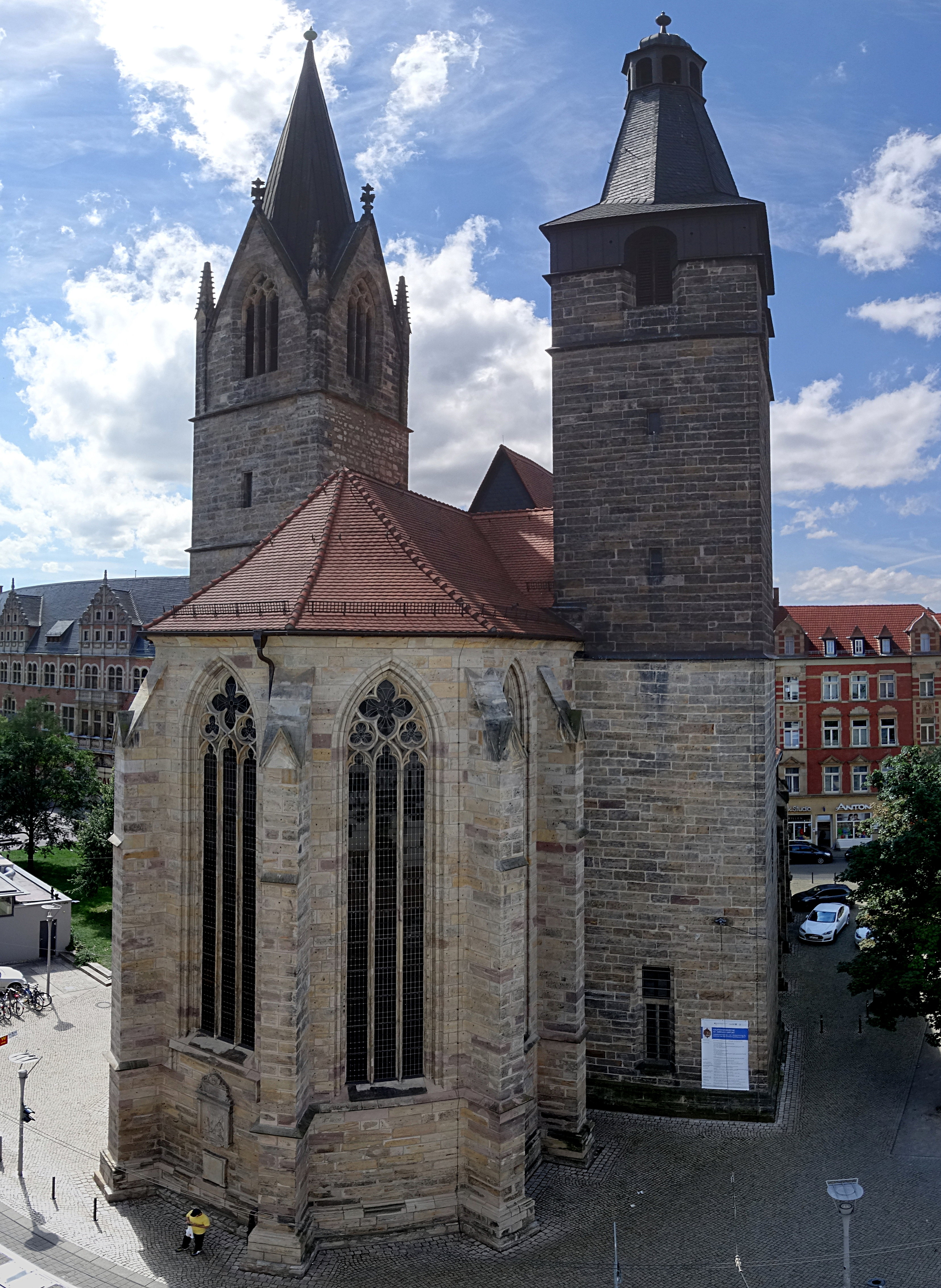
- View from east

- Location of the Kaufmannskirche in Germany
- 50.97798°N 11.03510°E
- Location: Erfurt, Thuringia
- Country: Germany
- Language: German
- Denomination: Lutheran
- Previous denomination: Roman Catholic
- Website: kaufmannsgemeinde-erfurt.de

History
- Status: Parish church
- Dedication: Gregory of Utrecht

Architecture
- Heritage designation: Kulturdenkmal in Thuringia
- Style: Gothic
- Years built: before 1368

The Kaufmannskirche (pronounced [ˈkaʊfmansˌkɪʁçə], "Merchant's Church") is a church building in the historical centre of the city of Erfurt in Thuringia, Germany. It is located at the north end of Erfurt's Anger square and has been Lutheran since 1521.

== History ==
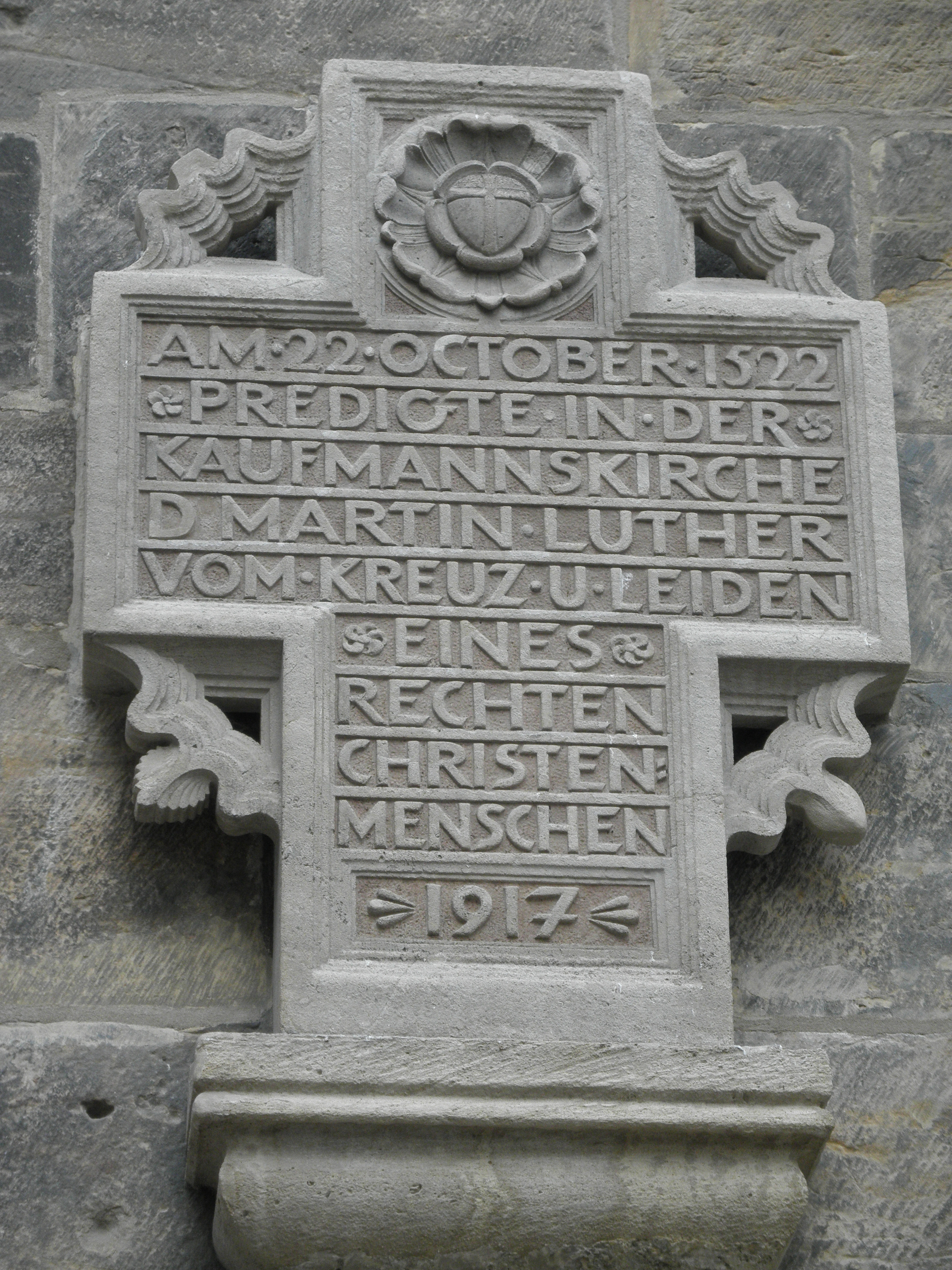
Martin Luther memorial cross

The early history of the Kaufmannskirche is disputed. It is possible that it was founded by Frisian merchants in the 8th century, although more recent research tends to assume that it was founded in the High Middle Ages. As the parish church of the first market settlement in the city, the Merchants' Church is dedicated to St Gregory of Utrecht. Along with the Reglerkirche, it is one of the two double-towered parish churches in the city. After a fire in 1291, the present building was essentially built in Gothic style by 1368. The church's late-Renaissance interior dates from 1598 to 1625.

The church was used as one of the two collection points for the taxes payable to the Archbishop of Mainz (mentioned in 1108), which also indicates its great age. From 1636 to 1650, the Kaufmannskirche served as a Swedish garrison church. In 1668, Johann Sebastian Bach's parents were married in the church. From 1855 to 1865, extensive restoration work was carried out, including the installation of side galleries. In 1944, the church was severely damaged by an aerial mine and was restored until 1952. The altar was restored in 1955, the pulpit from 1987 to 1992, the south tower in 1994 and the north tower in 2001. On 28 June 2009, a thanksgiving and baptismal service celebrated the completion of the restoration of the church's baptismal font, which is over 400 years old.

In 1917, the text Am 22. Oktober 1522 predigte in der Kaufmannskirche Martin Luther vom Kreuz und Leiden eines rechten Christenmenschen –1917– ("On 22 October 1522, Martin Luther preached in the Kaufmannskirche about the cross and suffering of a true Christian –1917–") was inserted into the outer church wall, in the direction of the Anger and the Martin Luther monument, in the form of a stone cross.

In 1965, the Kaufmänner-Pfarrhaus ("merchants' clergy house") to the north of the church was demolished for traffic reasons. It dated from the beginning of the 18th century and had been built in Baroque forms. The Institute for the Preservation of Historical Monuments had tried in vain to preserve the parsonage.

According to a "master plan" (as of 2010), the Kaufmannskirche is to be redesigned for cultural and social functions in addition to its religious function. The galleries and the pews are to be removed and a "modern rectangular building made of translucent glass" is to be added to the south side facing the Anger.

== Interior ==
=== High altar ===
In 1625, the 8.5-metre-high (28 ft) and 3.6-metre-wide (12 ft) high altar made of lime wood was erected in the choir by the Friedemann brothers. It was painted and gilded – presumably because of the outbreak of the Thirty Years' War – only in 1671 by Michael Kesweiß from Gotha. The original high altar was destroyed by a vault collapse in 1594.

It is a winged altar with a central shrine, fixed side wings and a sprinkling, which stands on a predella. On the central shrine, and thus in the centre, the Last Supper is depicted. This scene is framed by two composite columns and the side wings. The left wing relief shows the Annunciation at the bottom and the birth of Jesus at the top. The right wing relief depicts the Circumcision at the bottom and the Baptism at the top. Both side wings are bordered on the outside by depictions of the Evangelists. In the superstructure, the focus is on the depiction of the Crucifixion, which is flanked on the left by the Resurrection and on the right by the Ascension. Above this, the Last Judgment is depicted on the left and Damnation on the right. At the very top is Jesus as the Judge of the World, seated on a rainbow, flanked by Moses and John and surrounded by angels' heads. The sprinkling consists of four standing angels holding the instruments of torture in their hands. On the predella is written in Latin as well as in Aramaic, Hebrew and Greek script: "This is my body, this is my blood." (Matthew 26:26–28).

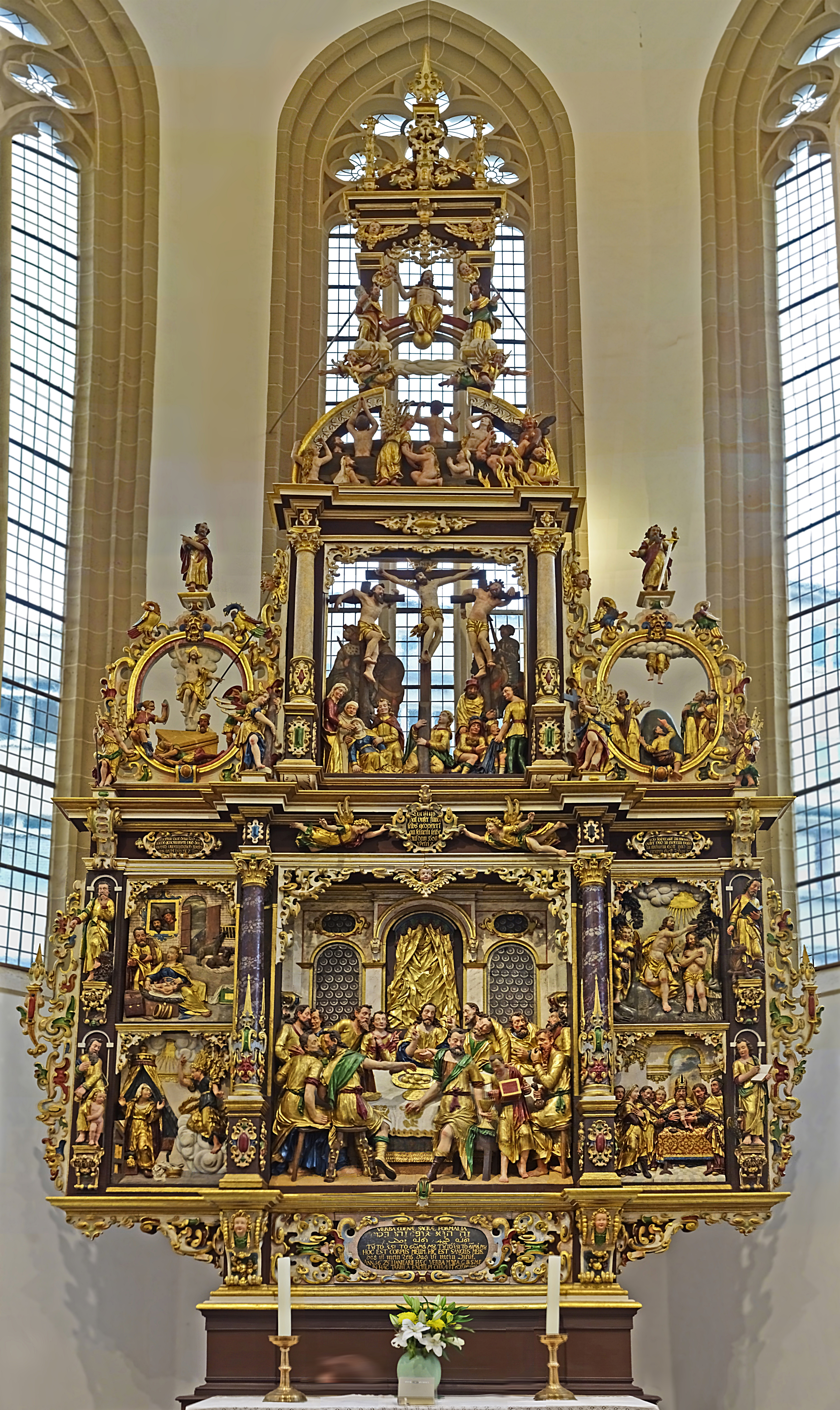
The altar

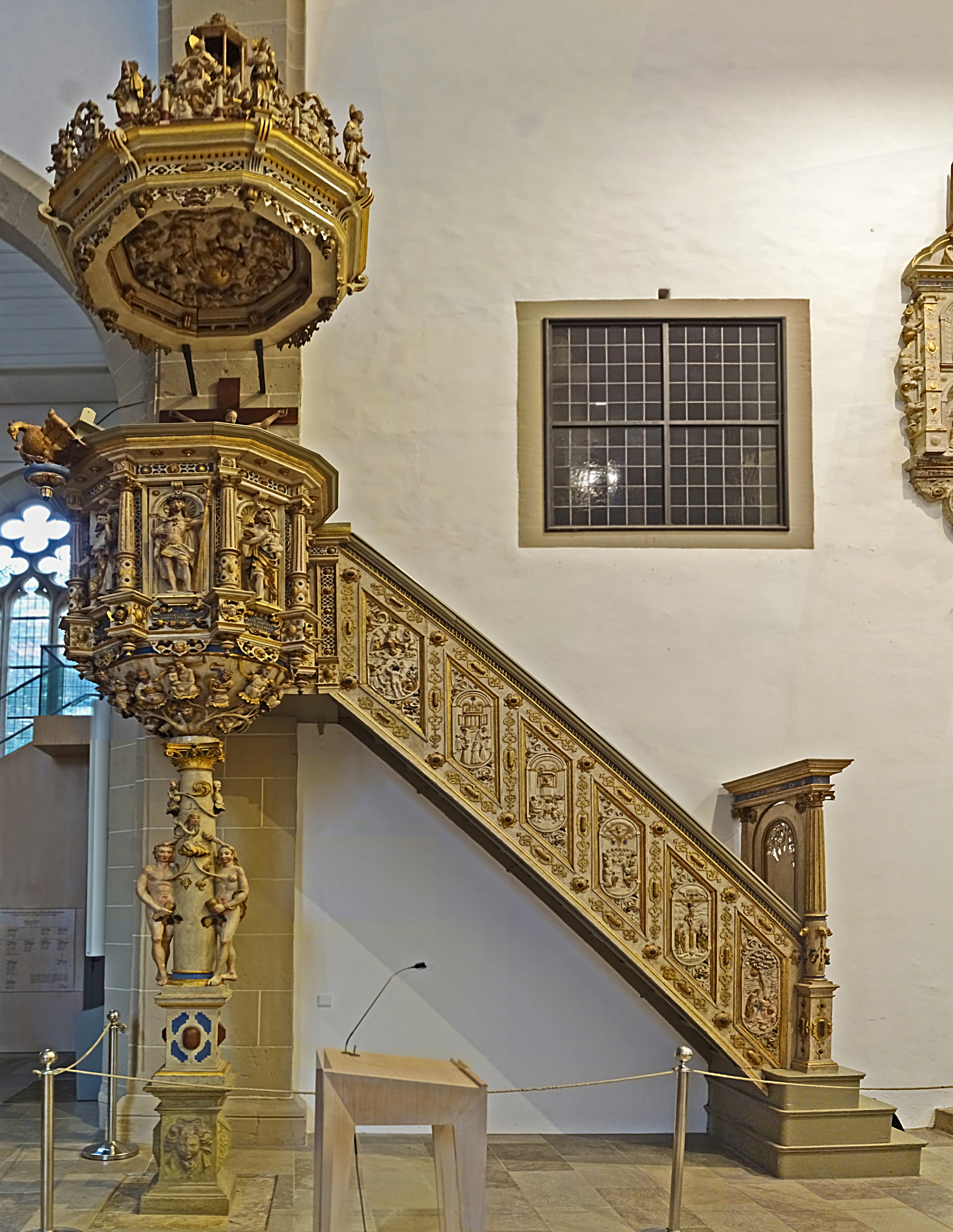
The pulpit

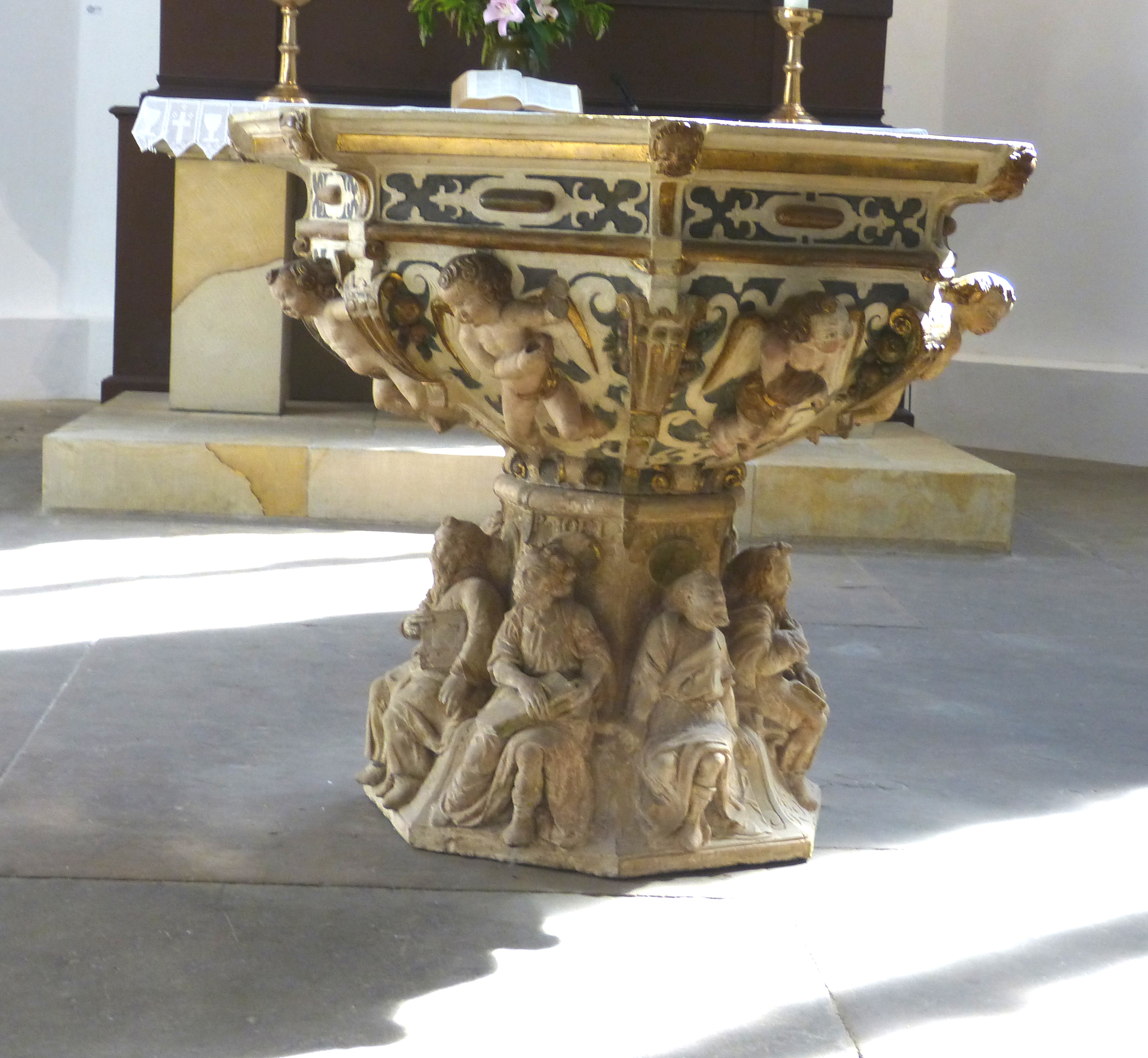
The baptismal font

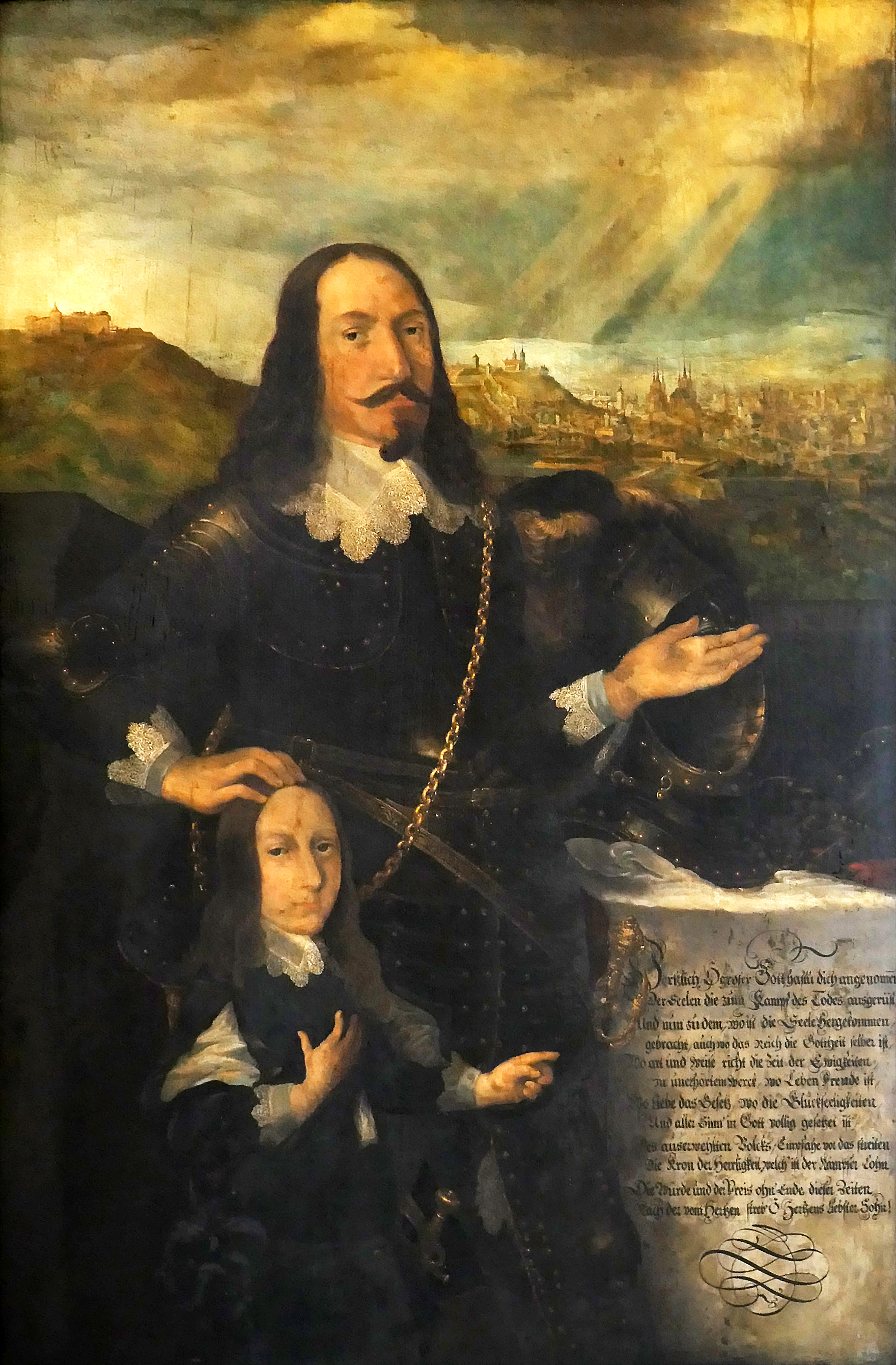
Caspar Ermes with son (Christian Richter c. 1650)

=== Pulpit ===
Likewise by the Friedemann brothers, the 7-metre-high (23 ft) pulpit was built in 1598 on the southern pillar of the triumphal arch in the choir. Since restoration work in the 19th century, it has been located on today's north side.

The pulpit depicts the Protestant doctrine figuratively. Thus Adam and Eve, who are at the base of the pulpit made of sandstone, are supposed to be the representatives of humanity. They are blessed by Abraham, whose blessing is also transferred to Isaac, Jacob and Jesus, who are depicted above him. Below the pulpit basket, David with harp can be seen singing the Psalms, as can Mary with Child and the progenitors of Jesus. Above, directly on the pulpit basket, Jesus is depicted as the Man of Sorrows, who suffered and then died for humanity. On the pulpit basket are a prophet, John the Baptist and a Caritas figure. On the sounding board are the Disciples of Jesus, except for Judas. Ambrose, Augustine, Jerome and Gregory the Great are on the top of the sound lid and the representation of the Trinity of God on the bottom.

On the cheek of the pulpit staircase, six bas-reliefs depict the Creed from Creation to Redemption to Sanctification. The Last Supper and the Last Judgment are also depicted. There are two reliefs on the pulpit door. The first shows thieves breaking into the sheepfold, the second how the flock is finally led back. In addition, "I am the door to the sheep" (John 10:7) can be read in Latin. The door is supposed to symbolise Jesus and that the preacher may only come to the congregation through him, i. e. with his message.

=== Baptismal font ===
According to an anonymous chronicle note, the baptismal font from the workshop of the Friedemann brothers was erected in the choir at Easter 1608. It is made of sandstone and is 1.07 metres (3 ft 6 in) high, 55 centimetres (1 ft 10 in) wide and its upper diameter is 1.22 metres (4 ft 0 in). Its seven-sided base is decorated with prophets from the Old Testament. They are supposed to point to the coming of the Saviour. The basin is framed by winged putti with instruments of torture. The putti are supposed to symbolise the New Testament. As babies used to be immersed in the font for baptism, the stone font is very deep. Today, however, this is no longer practised, so a shallow brass baptismal bowl is placed above the basin.

=== Organ ===
The first organ was built in 1511 by Barthel Herings. This was replaced in 1686–1688 by a new instrument by Christoph Junge, whose Baroque case is still preserved today. In 1845, Johann Michael Hesse the Younger repaired and extended the organ. In 1911, a new organ built by Wilhelm Rühlmann with 42 stops on three manuals and pedal was consecrated. In 1957, the company Schuster & Sohn built a new instrument, retaining some of the stops and the wind chests of the Rühlmann organ. The organ was located on the west wall until 2020, has since become defective and has been dismantled. It is planned to install a new organ in the Baroque case on a gallery that is also to be newly built; an electronic organ is being used as a transitional measure.

=== Paintings ===
In the southern gallery staircase, there are two paintings by the Erfurt painter Christian Richter. One shows the Swedish colonel and city commander Caspar Ermes (died 1648) with his son, the other his wife Anna (died 1654) with their two deceased children. Both paintings are 1.60 metres (5 ft 3 in) high and 1.05 metres (3 ft 5 in) wide. The portrait of Ermes shows a view of the city of Erfurt in the background. It was painted around 1650; that of his wife five years earlier.

Two further paintings can be found in the northern gallery staircase. One of them, 2.32 metres (7 ft 7 in) high and 1.17 metres (3 ft 10 in) wide, was painted around 1670 and shows Magister Nikolaus Stenger, who died in 1680. He was the pastor of the Kaufmannskirche for a long time and also worked as a professor at Erfurt University. The oldest authentic view of the Kaufmannskirche can be seen in the background.

=== Epitaphs ===
The choir walls are dominated by the numerous epitaphs. Presumably only the three large epitaphs survived the vault collapse of 1594. The epitaph of Hans Ziegler was created in 1584, that of Wolfgang von Tettau around 1585 and that of the family of Sigismund von der Sachsen around 1592. The epitaphs erected after 1594 probably originate from the workshop of the Friedemann brothers. Epitaphs and gravestones from the 14th to the 17th century can be found throughout the nave.

== Bibliography ==
- Haetge, Ernst (1932). Die Kunstdenkmale der Provinz Sachsen. Die Stadt Erfurt. Kaufmannskirche. Vol. 2, part 2. Burg: August Hopfer Verlag.
- Eißing, Stephanie; et al. (2003). Georg Dehio: Handbuch der deutschen Kunstdenkmäler. Thüringen. Berlin/München: Deutscher Kunstverlag. ISBN 3-422-03095-6.
