= Theodard of Utrecht =

Theodard
- Bishop of Utrecht
- Church: Catholic Church
- Diocese: Archdiocese of Utrecht
- In office: 784–c.790

Personal details
- Died: around 790

Theodard (Thiatbraht) was Bishop of Utrecht from around 784 to around 790.

It is believed that because of his name Théodard, like his predecessors Gregory and Alberic, he was related to the Carolingian house. There is nothing known of his administration.

In Vienna there is a 6th-century Livy manuscript written with a note from the 8th century: Codex iste est episcopi Theutberti the Dorestat (translation: this book is owned by Theutbert, bishop of Dorestad).

Preceded by Alberic of Utrecht	Bishop of Utrecht; 784-790	Succeeded by Hamacarus
