= Floris van Wevelinkhoven =

- Bishop of Utrecht
- Church: Catholic Church
- Diocese: Archdiocese of Utrecht
- In office: 1379–1393

Personal details
- Born: c. 1330
- Died: 4 April 1393

Floris van Wevelinkhoven (ca. 1330 – Castle Hardenberg, 4 April 1393) was Bishop of Münster from 1364 to 1379 and Bishop of Utrecht from 1379 to 1393.

Floris van Wevelinkhoven descended from high nobility and started his career in the Bishopric of Cologne, where he climbed to the position of vicedeacon of the cathedral chapter in 1356. He was appointed bishop of Münster by the pope as a result of several changes in positions, in which the Bishop of Liège Engelbert III of the Mark was moved to Cologne, the bishop of Utrecht Jan van Arkel was moved to Liege, and the bishop of Münster Jan van Virneburg was moved to Utrecht. Such movements were common in medieval times because whenever someone became bishop of a new bishopric, he had to pay a large amount of taxes to the pope, the so-called servitia tax.

In Münster, Floris fought the unruly nobility and put the bishopric's finances in order. In 1368, he signed a Landesvereinigung with the States.

In 1379, another shuffle of ecclesiastical seats took place; Arnold II of Horne was moved from Utrecht to Liege by Pope Urban VI, and Floris was moved from Münster to Utrecht. Despite his advanced age at his accession (c. 50), Floris showed himself to be an able and powerful ruler, a good organiser and diplomat, and he secured the support of his subjects.

Firstly, he had to deal with a rival candidate, the by Antipope Clement VII appointed Reinoud van Vianen. The start of his reign was further made difficult by the rising faction struggles in Utrecht, which were finally put to rest by the banishment of the Gunterlingen faction in 1380.

Once firmly established, Floris dealt with the unruly knights in the Sticht with support from the cities and chapters, and this way enlarged his authority. His predecessor, Arnold van Hoorn, had been forced to lease a lot of castles as a result of high debts, but Floris managed to take them back by arms. In the case of the castle of Montfoort it took a siege of five months. Though he later had to lease several castles and offices again, his secular rule can be considered to be a success.

In the Western Schism, Floris sided with Pope Urban VI. He was at first sympathetic with the ideas of Geert Groote, but at the encouragement of Geert Groote's opponents, he gave him a speaking ban. Later, however, he favored the monasteries of the Modern Devotion, such as the Congregation of Windesheim

Floris van Wevelinkhoven is buried in the Dom Church. A gravestone in the highchoir commemorates him.

In 2008, a square in Hardenberg was named after him; the van Wevelinckhovenplein. In Zwolle, a street has been named after him.

== Sources ==
- J.H. Huiting, Florens van Wevelinghofen, in: Utrechtse biografieën, deel 1 (Amsterdam, z.j.)

Regnal titles
Catholic Church titles
Preceded by Arnold II of Horne	Prince-Bishop of Utrecht; 1378–1393	Succeeded by Frederik III van Blankenheim
Preceded by John I of Virneburg	Prince-Bishop of Münster; 1364–1378	Succeeded by John II Potho of Pothenstein
