= Adalbold =

Adalbold was the name of:

- Adalbold I, 9th-century bishop of Utrecht
- Adalbold II of Utrecht, 11th-century bishop of Utrecht
