= Hamacarus =

Dutch bishop

- Bishop of Utrecht
- Church: Catholic Church
- Diocese: Archdiocese of Utrecht
- In office: c.790–806

Personal details
- Died: 806

Hamacarus was Bishop of Utrecht from around 790 to 806.

From Hamacarus nothing is known except that he was a bishop of Utrecht.

Preceded by Theodard of Utrecht	Bishop of Utrecht; 790-806	Succeeded by Ricfried
