= Frederik II van Sierck =

Bishop of Utrecht

- Bishop of Utrecht
- Church: Catholic Church
- Diocese: Utrecht
- In office: 1317–1322

Personal details
- Died: 20 July 1322

Frederick van Sierck (died 20 July 1322) served as Bishop of Utrecht from 1317 until his death in 1322.

Frederick van Sierck was the protégé of William III, Count of Holland, who had managed to get him elected to the bishopric of Utrecht. This way the count was able to increase his influence in the bishopric, which led to friction between the nobility of Utrecht and the provost Floris van Jutphaas, who wanted to make an end to Hollandic influence. Floris won a trial over the definition of the jurisdiction between the bishop and the provost.

The construction of the Dom Tower of Utrecht began during Frederick's episcopate. The theory that the bishop wanted a strong defendable tower where he would be able to retreat in times of danger, is not universally accepted.

Frederick van Sierck was buried in a chapel named after him in the Dom Church.

Catholic Church titles
Preceded by Guy of Avesnes	Bishop of Utrecht; 1317–1322	Succeeded by Jacob van Oudshoorn
