= Frederick of Utrecht =

Bishop of Utrecht; Saint

- Bishop of Utrecht
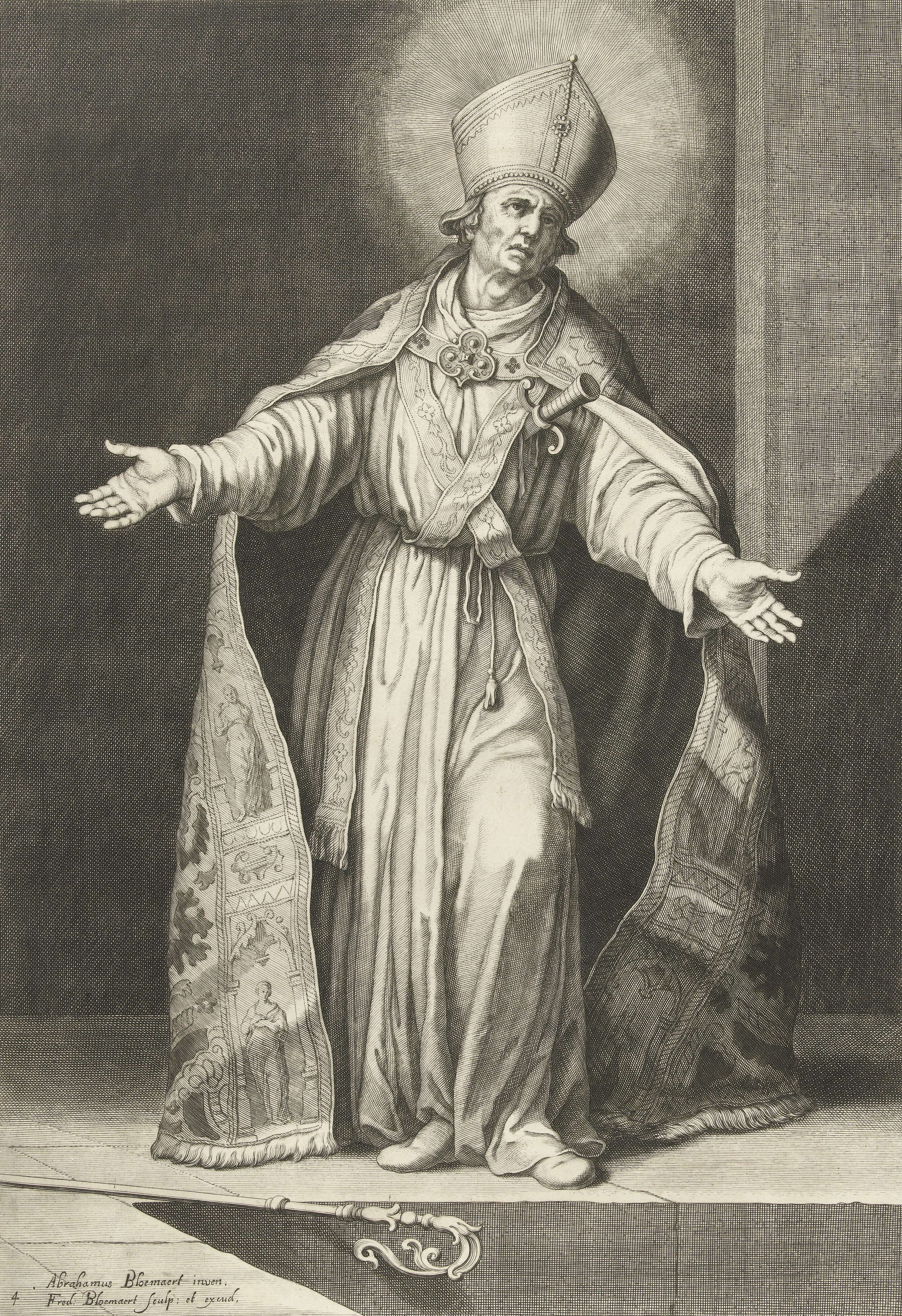
- Frederick of Utrecht, engraving from ca. 1630 by Frederik Bloemaert.]
- Church: Chalcedonian Christianity
- Diocese: Archdiocese of Utrecht
- In office: 815/816–834/838

Personal details
- Died: 834/838

Sainthood
- Venerated in: Catholic Church, Eastern Orthodox Church

Frederick I was Bishop of Utrecht between 815/816 and 834/838 AD, and is a saint of the Eastern Orthodox Church and Roman Catholic Church. His name is sometimes Latinized as Fridericus Cridiodunus.

Frederick was born around 780 in a noble family from Frisia. 16th-century folklore mistook him for a grandson of the Frisian King Radboud. According to Church records, he died on 18 July 838 but other sources give dates between 834 and 838. In any case it is certain that he was murdered.

At a young age he was taught at Utrecht by the clergy, including Bishop Ricfried. After completing his studies he was ordained priest and put in charge of converting the remaining heathens in the northern areas of the diocese, but also in areas outside of the diocese. It is known that he preached at Walcheren and together with St. Odulfus in Stavoren and its surroundings.

After the death of Ricfried in 815/816, Frederick was chosen as Bishop of Utrecht. He was known for his piety and erudition. He maintained a correspondence with Rabanus Maurus. He was praised for his knowledge and understanding during the synod of Mainz in 829. The hagiographyVita S. Bonifacii has been attributed to him.

It is unclear exactly how Frederick came to an end. It has been established that he was murdered, but by whom and why is unclear. Legend tells that he was stabbed by two men after the offering of the Mass on 18 July 838. According to the 11th and 12th century writers Bishop Otbert of Liège (Passio Frederici) and William of Malmesbury, the killers were hired by Empress Judith, because of Frederick's regular criticism of her dissolute way of life. Later writers like Cesare Baronio and Jean Mabillon write that the inhabitants of Walcheren, who were hostile to Christianity, sent them as a response to Frederick's preaching there.

The latter seems the most plausible. There are no sources of writers of the time showing that the empress was unchaste or immoral, or that Frederick had made that allegation. Moreover, Walcheren was quite hostile to the missionaries from Utrecht.

Shortly after his death, Frederick was canonized. His feast day is 18 July and he is the patron saint of the deaf. He was buried in St. Salvator's Church in Utrecht.

Preceded by Ricfried	Bishop of Utrecht ca. 815-ca. 830s	Succeeded by Alberik II
