= Jacob van Oudshoorn =

Dutch bishop

- Bishop of Utrecht
- Church: Catholic Church
- Diocese: Archdiocese of Utrecht
- In office: 1322

Personal details
- Died: c. 18 September 1322

Jacob van Oudshoorn (died c. 18 September 1322) was bishop of Utrecht in 1322.

Van Oudshoorn descended from a noble Hollandic house; he was the son of Willem and brother of Dirk van Oudshoorn (1301–1327), lords of Oudshoorn and Aarlanderveen. Van Oudshoorn was deacon in Utrecht before he was elected bishop. He was consecrated by the archbishop of Cologne, Hendrik II van Virnenburg, but pope John XXII only accepted his nomination after the payment of a large amount of money, which ruined his family. Shortly after this he died, according to his own suspicions, from poison. He was called brave, learned and pious.

== Literature ==
Van der Aa, Biographisch Woordenboek der Nederlanden (1852)

Preceded by Frederik II van Sierck	Bishop of Utrecht; 1322	Succeeded by Jan III van Diest
