= Radboud of Utrecht =

Dutch saint and bishop

Saint Radboud
- Bishop of Utrecht
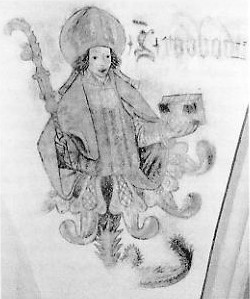
- Image of Bishop Radboud in the Broerenkerk in Zwolle
- Church: Catholic Church
- Diocese: Archdiocese of Utrecht
- In office: 900–917

Personal details
- Born: before 850
- Died: 917

Saint Radbod (or Radboud; before 850 – 917) was bishop of Utrecht from 899 to 917.

== Life ==
Radboud was born around the middle of the 9th century from a noble Frankish family near Namur. His mother was of Frisian origin and a descendant of the Frisian king Radboud (died in 719). Radboud began his studies under the care of his maternal uncle Günther, Archbishop of Cologne, from 850 until his deposition in 863. After that Radboud continued his studies at the court school of the Western Frankish king Charles the Bald (843- 877), whose chaplain he became. Much of his life was devoted to study and science.

After Charles's death, he presumably became a Benedictine monk in the famous Saint-Martin convent of Tours. In 899 Radboud was elected bishop of the diocese of Utrecht with the permission of Emperor Arnulf of Carinthia (887-899). Because Utrecht was destroyed by the Normans, he did not live there but in Deventer in the Oversticht, where one of his predecessors had settled.

As bishop, Radboud was the most important representative of East Frankish authority in the northern Netherlands. In 911, however, the Duchy of Lorraine, in which the diocese of Utrecht was located, came to the western Frankish kingdom. Radboud then seems to have wavered between loyalty to his old king or loyalty and connection with the new monarch. His most ancient biographical description criticizes him for the use of bishops in the East Frankish government, but this criticism may be the responsibility of the author. Around 914/915 he traveled to Rome where he presented a further unknown conflict with Count Meginhard of Hamaland to Pope John X (914-928); After having heard Radboud and representatives of Meginhard, the pope found a settlement.

Radboud made preparations to take the seat in Utrecht again. To do so, he drew up a list of all the possessions of the diocese before the expulsion by the Normans. Radboud fell ill on a mission trip in Drenthe and died in Ootmarsum in November 917 before these plans could be executed. He was buried in the Lebuïnuskerk, Deventer.

He had appointed his successor, Balderik, himself.

== Writings ==
A number of smaller writings are attributed to Radboud, but there are doubts about his authorship. Most of the writings are saints' lives, some in prose, others in verses. He described the life of the Anglo-Saxon missionaries Boniface (in prose), Suitbert and Lebuïnus (both in a sermon and in verses), as well as St. Amalberga (?) and Bishop Saint Servatius of Maastricht .

== Veneration ==
He was buried in the Lebuin Church of Deventer. Several sources, including historian Johan Picardt, indicate that his intestines have been buried in the church in Nijenstede. During the Middle Ages, the veneration of Saint Radboud remained limited to the diocese of Utrecht. His feast day is 29 November.

=== Patronage ===
In the Netherlands, Radboud is the patron of Catholic scientific practice. In 1905, the St. Radboud Foundation was established with the aim of promoting Catholic higher education in the Netherlands and in particular the establishment of a Catholic university. In 1923 the Catholic University of Nijmegen was opened, in 1956 the associated Sint-Radboud hospital (now Radboudumc). On 1 September 2004, the university adopted the name Radboud University Nijmegen.

Catholic Church titles
Preceded by Adalbold I	Bishop of Utrecht; 900–917	Succeeded by Balderic of Utrecht
