= Holwierde =

- Village
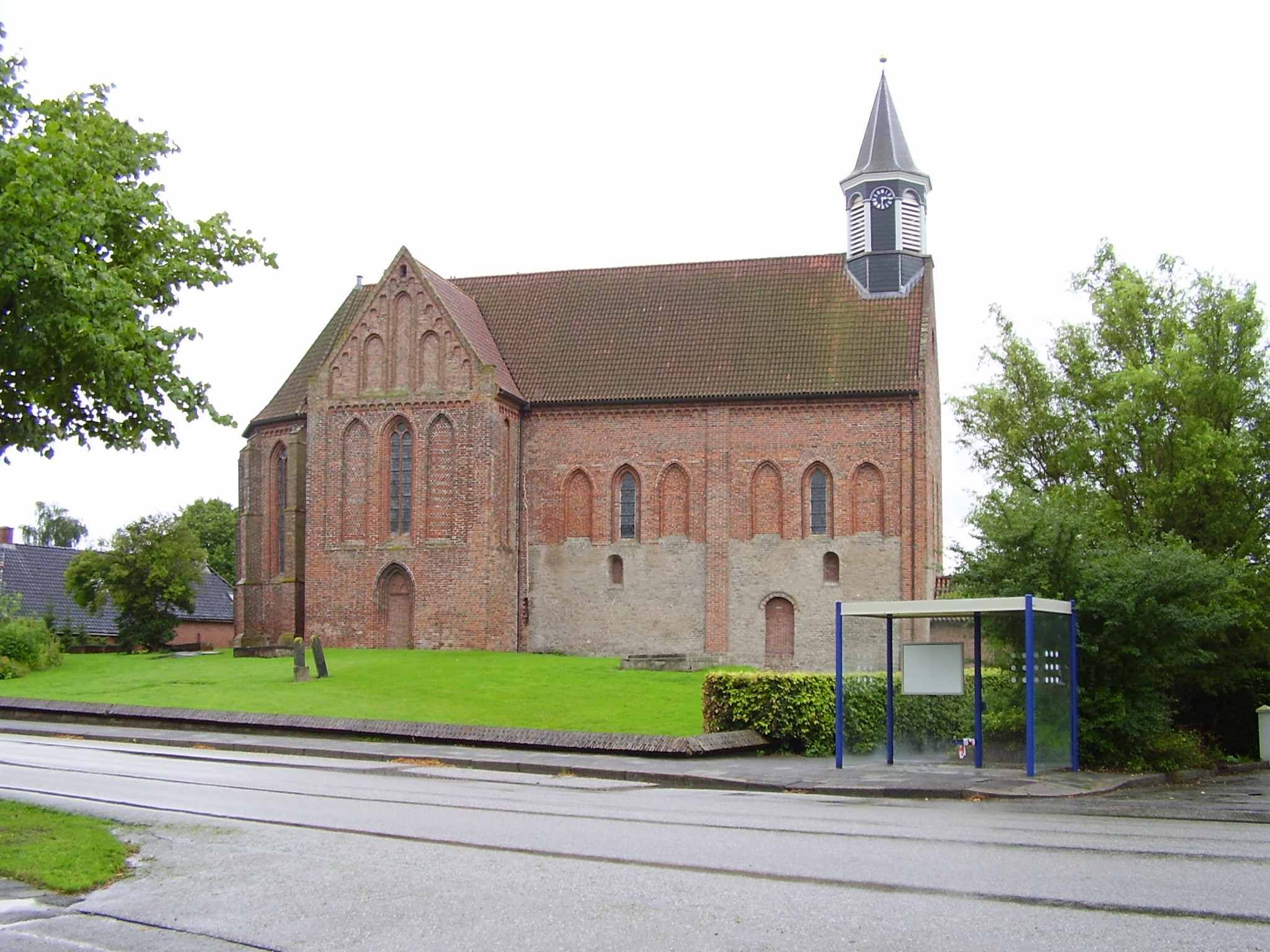
- Stefanuskerk (Stephen Church)

- Location in the province of Groningen in the Netherlands Holwierde (Netherlands)
- Coordinates: 53°21′N 6°52′E
- Country: Netherlands
- Province: Groningen
- Municipality: Eemsdelta

Area
  - Total: 0.56 km^{2} (0.22 sq mi)
- Elevation: 0.8 m (2.6 ft)

Population (2021)
  - Total: 935
  - Density: 1,700/km^{2} (4,300/sq mi)
- Time zone: UTC+1 (CET)
  - Summer (DST): UTC+2 (CEST)
- Postal code: 9905
- Dialing code: 0596

Holwierde (Dutch pronunciation: [ɦɔlˈʋiːrdə]; Gronings: Holwier [ɦɔɫˈʋiːɾ]) is a village in the municipality of Eemsdelta in the province of Groningen in the Netherlands. It lies about 26 km (16.2 mi) northeast of the city of Groningen.

== History ==
The village was first mentioned in 1247 as "in Halwirth". The etymology is unclear. Holwierde is a terp (artificial living hill) village from the early middle ages. In the late middle ages, a canal was dug to the Damsterdiep.

The nave of the Dutch Reformed church dates from the 11th century. The church has been extended in the 13th and 14th century. The tower was from the 13th century, but collapsed in 1836 and the remains were demolished in 1854.

Holwierde was home to 66 people in 1840. In April 1945, Holwierde was heavy damaged. The German forces had decided to make a last stand, and taken a part of the male population hostage in the church.

The 8th-century Frisian bard Bernlef lived in Holwierde.

== Gallery ==
Reformed church

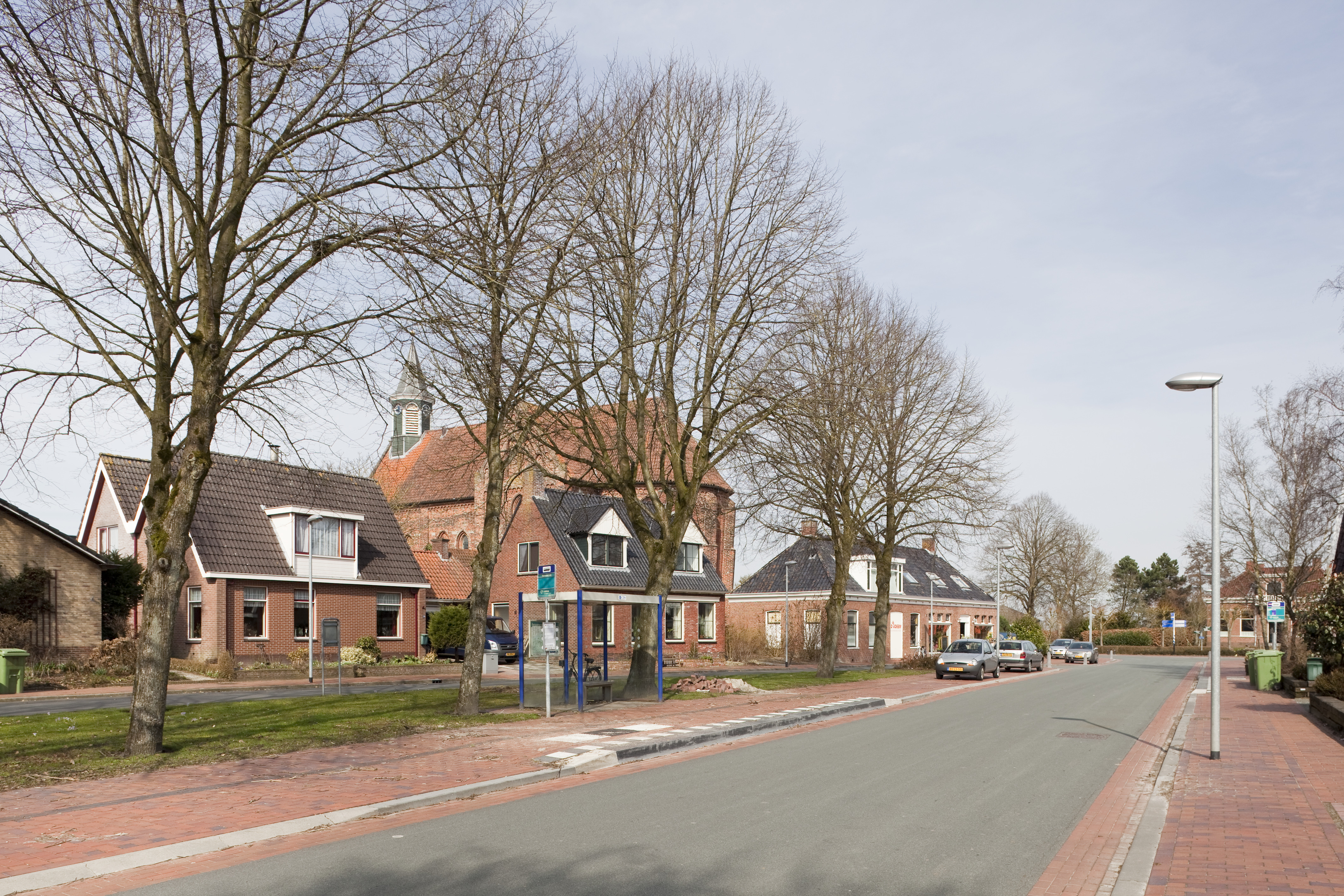
Street view

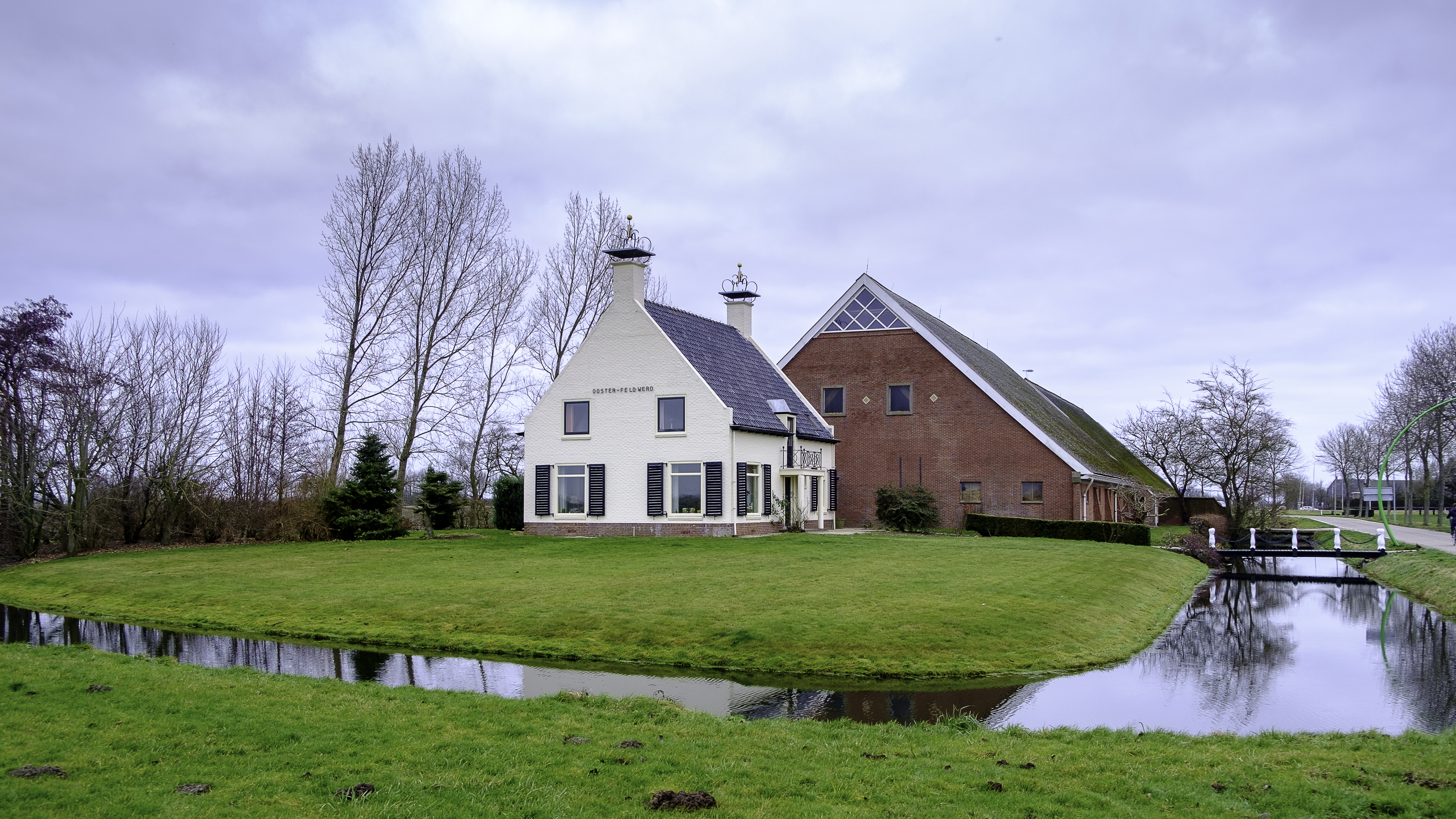
Farm near Holwierde

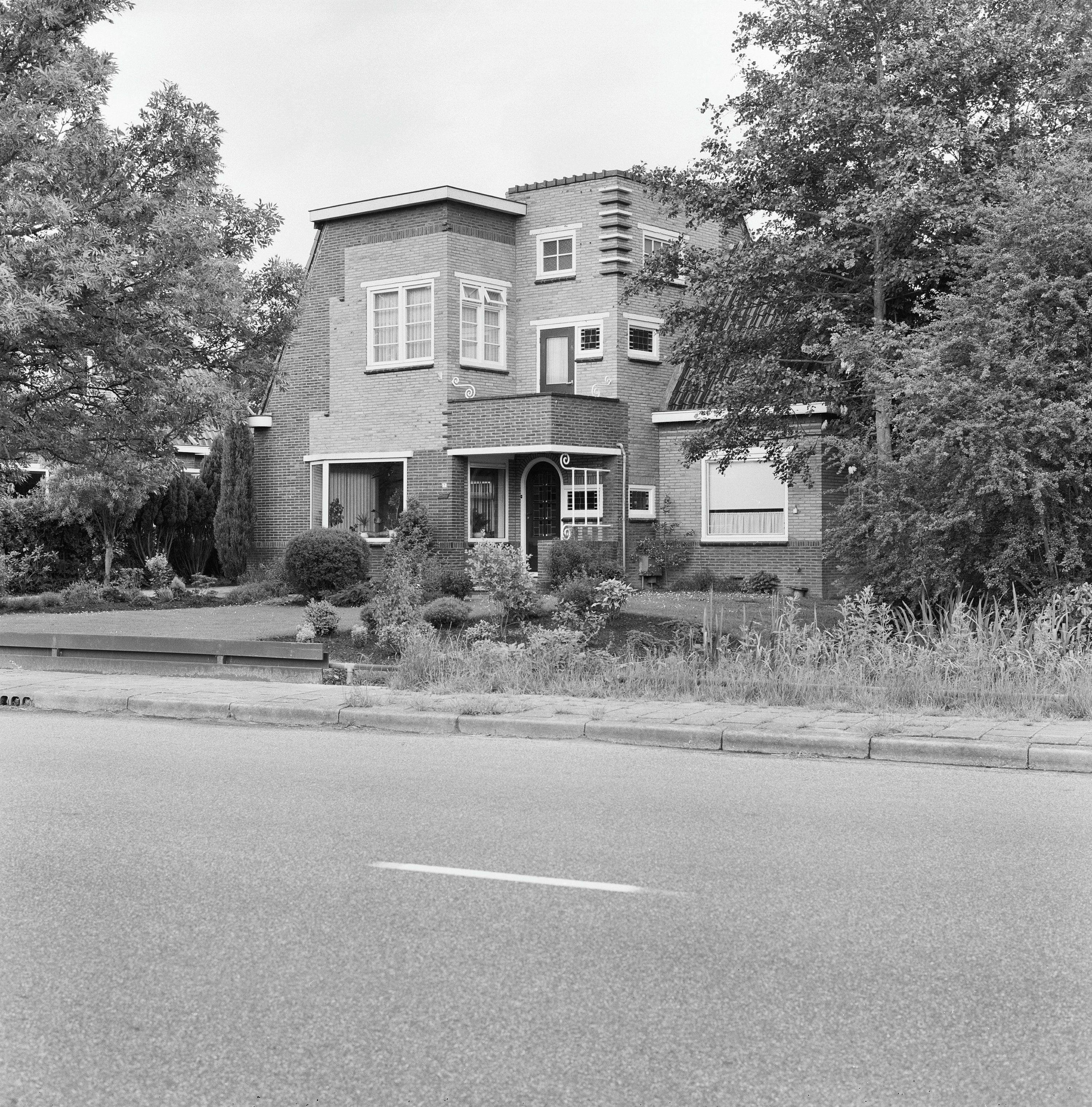
Villa in Holwierde
