= Arnold II of Horne =

Prince-Bishop of Liège

- Prince-Bishop of Liège
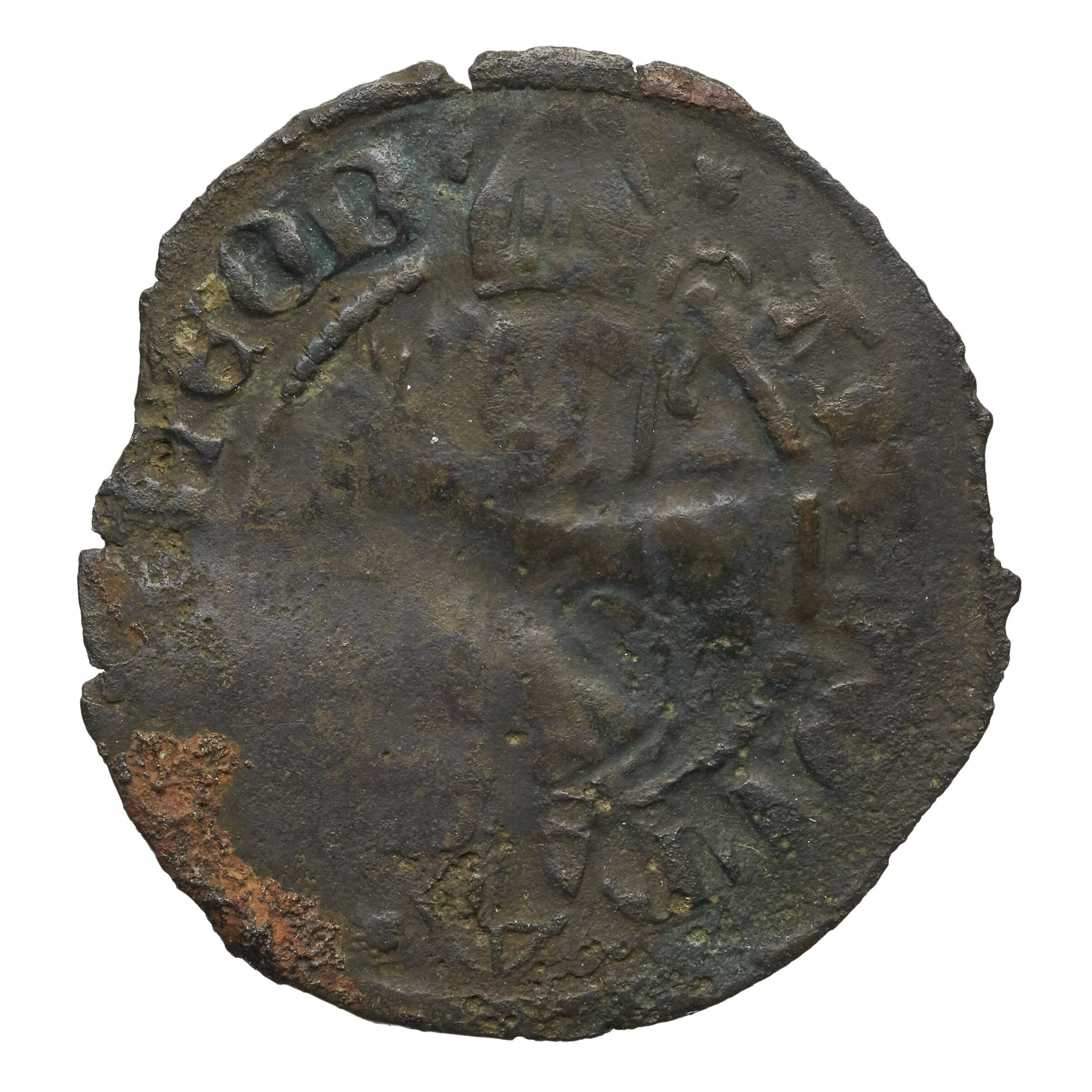
- Coin issued by Arnold of Horne during his tenure as bishop of Liège (1378-1389)
- Church: Catholic Church
- Diocese: Liège
- In office: 1378–1389
- Previous posts: Bishop of Utrecht

Personal details
- Died: 8 March 1389

Arnold II of Horne (1339 - 8 March 1389) served as Prince and Bishop of Liège from 1378 until his death in 1389. He had previously served as Bishop of Utrecht from 1371 to 1378.

== Early life ==
Arnold was the son of Willem IV of Horne and Elisabeth of Cleves. Because of his noble background, he was able to receive a high education. In 1359, he graduated in Paris with a degree in the seven liberal arts. Arnold continued his academic career in Montpellier, where he specialized in both secular and canon law.

After completing his studies, Arnold opted for a career as a clergyman. He became a canon in the dioceses of both Liège and Utrecht in 1361. In 1362 he became a canon and archdeacon in Cologne as well. Around the same time, Arnold spent some time in Avignon, where he came into closer contact with the inner circle of the Pope.

== Bishop of Utrecht ==
After the death of bishop Jan van Virneburg in 1371, the cathedral chapter nominated its provost Zweder Uterlo as candidate for the bishopric, but the rest of the chapters supported the papal candidate Arnold van Horne, who as a result become bishop. Arnold seems to have been a forceful bishop, though he endangered the financial state of the bishopric.

In 1371, Arnold involved himself in the Guelders War of Succession, choosing the side of duchess-pretender Mechteld of Guelders. This involvement almost led to his capture in Tiel in September 1372 as well as William II, Duke of Jülich burning down several villages in the bishopric of Utrecht (Amerongen, Doorn, Zeist en De Bilt). It also put a financial strain on the bishopric.

From 1373 to 1375 Arnold also waged war against the County of Holland and its duke Albert over the advantageously located trading town of Vreeswijk. These actions had little results however, while they cost a lot of money. While the western border of the Sticht was re-enforced and the Hollandic advance was halted, Holland still held the mouth of the rivers Vecht and Lek, which kept Utrecht isolated.

Bishop Arnold was forced to grant participation to the Utrecht burghers in the administration of the land, in the Stichtse Landbrief (Land Letter of the Diocese) of 17 May 1375, after which they accepted new taxes in order to straighten out the financial status of the bishopric. This Landbrief is an important document that is considered the first constitution of the Nedersticht.

Now that the conflicts had been halted, an old party struggle in the city erupted again, with the Gunterlingen on one side and the Lichtenbergers on the other side. Bishop Arnold managed to keep the parties separate. During his tenure as bishop of Utrecht, Arnold also besieged several castles, such as Puttenstein in 1375 and Loenersloot in 1377.

== Bishop of Liège ==
In July 1378, Liège's bishop John of Arkel died and Arnold was moved to the Bishopric of Liège by Pope Urban VI. However, the chapter at Liege had chosen Eustache of Rochefort for the bishopric, and this candidate was supported by Antipope Clement VII. Only after a year of struggle was Arnold able to take his seat as bishop of Liège in early 1379.

During his tenure as bishop of Liège, Arnold besieged several castles and cities, such as Reifferscheid in 1385 and Ravenstein in 1388.

Arnold died after succumbing to illness on March 8, 1389. His body was buried in abbey of Keizerbosch (near Neer), while his heart was placed in the Carthusian monastery in Liège.

Arnold of Horne was a learned man who was a good organiser, and able to inspire people. He was also adept at the Vielle.

Arnold of Horne Lords of Horne Died: 8 March 1389
Catholic Church titles
Regnal titles
Preceded by Jan V van Virneburg	Bishop of Utrecht as Arnold II; 1371–1378	Succeeded by Floris van Wevelinkhoven
Preceded by John of Arkel	Prince-Bishop of Liège; 1378–1389	Succeeded by John of Bavaria
