= Jan van Virneburg =

Bishop of Utrecht

- Bishop of Utrecht
- Church: Catholic Church
- Diocese: Utrecht
- In office: 1364–1371
- Predecessor: Jan van Arkel
- Successor: Arnold II of Horne
- Previous post: Prince-Bishop of Münster

Personal details
- Died: 23 June 1371

Jan van Virneburg (died 23 June 1371) served as Bishop of Utrecht from 1364 until his death in 1371. He had previously served as Prince and Bishop of Münster from 1363 to 1364.

Jan van Virneburg was transferred from Münster to Utrecht by Pope Urban V after the transfer of bishop Jan van Arkel from Utrecht to Liege. His rule was not a success. Already during the vacancy before his consecration, the chapters and the city of Utrecht united to codify their rights in the so-called Overdrachte. Because of this, Jan was a weak leader, forced to follow the politics of the states. He did not succeed in continuing the strong rule his predecessor had had. During the war against Albert I, Count of Holland he suffered multiple defeats, and he was captured during an expedition to Twente. In order to pay his ransom he was forced to lease the Oversticht and Vollenhove.

Regnal titles
Catholic Church titles
Preceded by John of Arkel	Prince-Bishop of Utrecht; 1364–1371	Succeeded by Arnold II of Horne
Preceded by Adolphus of the Marck	Prince-bishop of Münster as John I 1363–1364	Succeeded by Florence of Wevelinkhoven
