= Jan III van Diest =

Bishop of Utrecht

- Bishop of Utrecht
- Church: Catholic Church
- Diocese: Utrecht
- In office: 1322–1340

Personal details
- Died: 1 June 1340

John or Jan van Diest (died 1 June 1340) served as Bishop of Utrecht from 1322 until his death in 1340.

Jan descended from a noble family from Brabant, and was initially provost of Cambrai. In 1322 Jan was proposed as candidate for the Bishopric of Utrecht by William III, Count of Holland and Reginald II of Guelders, much against the wishes of the Utrecht chapters, who had chosen Jan van Bronkhorst. The latter was confirmed by the archbishop of Cologne, but Pope John XXII intervened, declaring the choice of the Utrecht chapters void, and personally consecrated Jan van Diest in Avignon. It was not until 1327 that Jan was dedicated as priest.

Jan's reign was a low point for the bishopric of Utrecht. It was characterised by financial abuses and nepotism on a large scale. Upon taking office, Jan immediately inherited a large debt from his predecessors. Jan made the situation even worse through the purchase of goods in the Oversticht. Not only did the local nobility profit from this, but the counts of Holland and Guelders also saw their chances. They lent the bishop large amounts of money, which made the bishop completely dependent on them. In 1331 the counts of Holland and Guelders signed an agreement where they would divide the lands of the bishopric amongst themselves. William III threatened to take over the Nedersticht, and it was only because of the resistance of its citizens that the independence of the bishopric was maintained.

Jan van Diest was buried in the Dom Church.

Catholic Church titles
Preceded by Jacob van Oudshoorn	Bishop of Utrecht; 1322–1340	Succeeded by Jan IV van Arkel
