= Saint Hunger =

Dutch bishop and saint (died 866)

- Bishop of Utrecht
- Church: Catholic Church (pre-Schism Christian Church)
- Diocese: Archdiocese of Utrecht
- In office: 856–866

Personal details
- Died: 866

Hunger (ca. 800 – 866), also known as Hungerus Frisus, was the Bishop of Utrecht from 856 to 866. He is a saint of the Catholic and Eastern Orthodox Churches.

Hunger was born around 800, in Friesland. He joined the Benedictine order and in 856 became the Bishop of Utrecht. After the death of his predecessor Liudger of Utrecht, Liudger's nephew Craft was offered the seat. However, Craft, a very wealthy person, refused because he was afraid that he would attract Viking raids. Instead, Canon Hunger was appointed.

At first his relations with the Vikings were peaceful, but eventually Utrecht was threatened by the Vikings, which caused the bishop and the entire clergy of Utrecht to flee to Sint Odiliënberg, near Roermond. In 858, the Lotharingian king Lothair II made a monastery available for them. Later the bishop settled in Prüm and then in Deventer.

Hunger seems to have been a godly man who, unlike his predecessors, did not engage in nepotism. In the case of the childless marriage between Lothair II and his wife Teutberga, he defended the sanctity of their marriage on biblical and theological grounds, but to secure his succession, Lothair II repudiated his wife and married Waldrada, with whom he had a son.

Hunger died in Prüm, Germany. His feast day is on 22 December.

| Preceded by Liudger of Utrecht | Bishop of Utrecht; 856–866 | Succeeded by Adalbold I |
