= Diocese of Utrecht (695–1580) =

Historic Roman Catholic diocese

The historic Diocese of Utrecht was a diocese of the Latin Church (or Western) of the Catholic Church from 695 to 1580, and from 1559 archdiocese in the Low Countries before and during the Protestant Reformation.

== History ==
=== Diocese ===
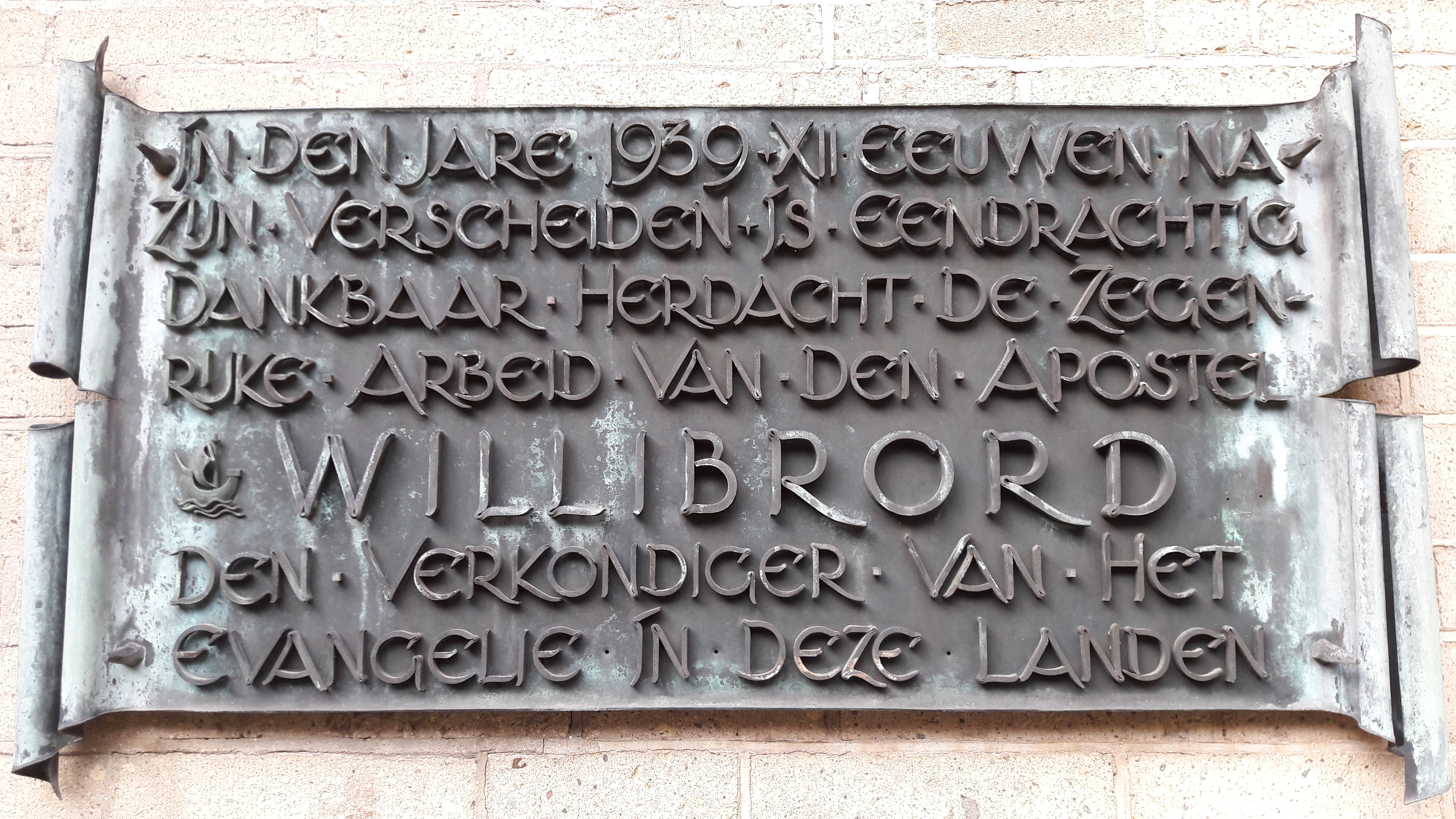
Commemorative plaque at the Domkerk in Utrecht. Translation: In the year 1939, twelve centuries after his death, the blessed work of the apostle Willibrord, the preacher of the Gospel in these lands, is unitedly and thankfully commemorated.

According to the Catholic Encyclopedia, the founding of the diocese dates back to Francia, when St. Ecgberht of Ripon sent St. Willibrord and eleven companions on a mission to pagan Frisia, at the request of Pepin of Herstal. The Diocese of Utrecht (Latin: Dioecesis Ultraiectensis) was erected by Pope Sergius I in 695. In 695 Sergius consecrated Willibrord in Rome as Bishop of the Frisians.

George Edmundson wrote in the 1911 edition of the Encyclopædia Britannica that the bishops of the Diocese, as the result of grants of immunities by a succession of German kings, and notably by the Saxon and Franconian emperors, gradually became the temporal rulers of a dominion as great as the neighboring counties and duchies. John Mason Neale explained, in History of the so-called Jansenist church of Holland, that bishops "became warriors rather than prelates; the duties of their pastoral office were frequently exercised by suffragans, while they themselves headed armies against the Dukes of Guelders or the Counts of Holland." Adalbold II of Utrecht "must be regarded as the principal founder of the territorial possessions of the diocese," according to Albert Hauck, in New Schaff–Herzog Encyclopedia of Religious Knowledge, especially by the acquisition in 1024 and 1026 of the counties of Drenthe and Teisterbant; but, the name "Bishopric of Utrecht" is not used in the article. Debitum pastoralis officii nobis was Pope Leo X's 1517 prohibition to the Archbishop-Elector of Cologne, Hermann of Wied, as legatus natus, (Note: "As papal power increased after the middle of the eleventh century these legates came to have less and less real authority and eventually the legatus natus was hardly more than a title.") to summon, to a court of first instance in Cologne, Philip of Burgundy, his treasurer, and his ecclesiastical and secular subjects. (Note: Joosting and Muller noted that Leo X also promulgated another bull, in which he commissioned that the Bishop of Utrecht, his treasurer and his subjects informed that they were empowered to disregard privileges formerly granted to others and to prosecute offenders while setting aside formerly specified legal process.) Leo X only confirmed a right of the Church, explained Neale; but Leo X's confirmation "was providential" in respect to the future schism. The Bishopric ended when Henry of the Palatinate resigned the see in 1528 with the consent of the cathedral chapter, and transferred his secular authority to Charles V, Holy Roman Emperor. The chapters voluntarily transferred their right of electing the bishop to Charles V, and Pope Clement VII gave his consent to the proceeding. George Edmundson wrote, in History of Holland, that Henry, "was compelled" in 1528 to formally surrender "the temporalities of the see" to Charles V.

=== Archdiocese ===
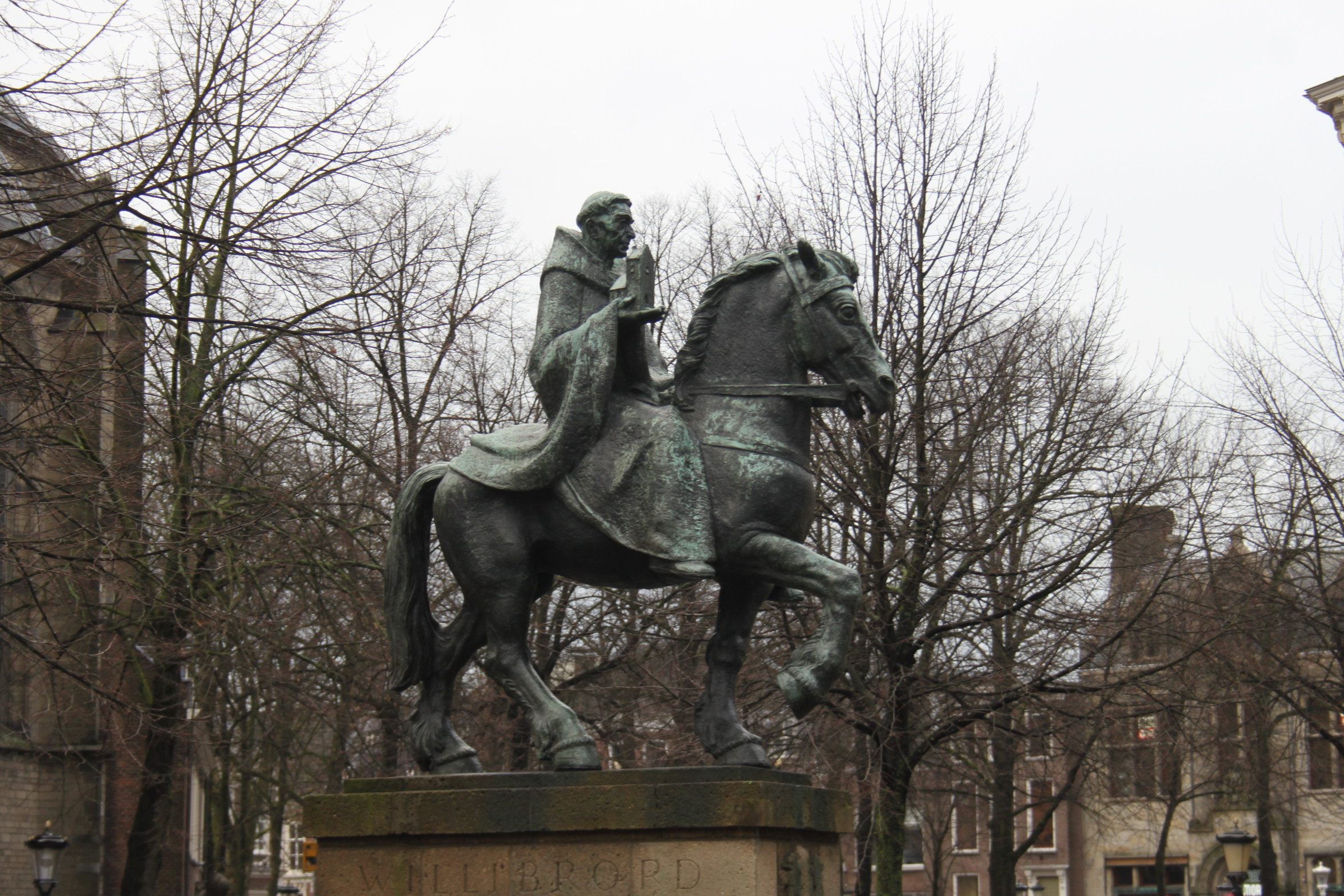
Statue of Saint Willibrord in Utrecht

The diocese was elevated to an archdiocese in 1559. It was taken from Province of Cologne, in which it was a suffragan, and elevated to the rank of an archdiocese and metropolitan see. During the administration of the first archbishop, Frederik V Schenck van Toutenburg, Calvinism spread rapidly, especially among the nobility, who viewed with disfavor the endowment of the new bishoprics with the ancient and wealthy abbeys. The parish churches were attacked in the Beeldenstorm in 1566. The hanging of the nineteen Martyrs of Gorkum in Brielle in 1572 is an example of the persecution which Catholics suffered. During the Dutch Revolt in the Spanish Netherlands, the archdiocese fell. In the Beeldenstorm in 1580, the collegiate churches were victims of iconoclastic attacks and St. Martin's Cathedral, Utrecht, was "severely damaged". "Even though approximately one third of the people remained Roman Catholic and in spite of a relatively great tolerance," as early as 1573, the public exercise of Catholicism was forbidden, and the cathedral was converted into a Protestant church in 1580. The cathedral chapter survived and "still managed its lands and formed part of the provincial government" in the Lordship of Utrecht. "The newly appointed canons, however, were always Protestants." The two succeeding archbishops appointed by Spain neither received canonical confirmation nor could they enter their diocese because of the States-General opposition. The archdiocese was suppressed in 1580. Walter Phillips wrote, in Encyclopædia Britannica, 1911 edition, the last archbishop of Utrecht, Frederik V Schenck van Toutenburg, died in 1580, "a few months before the suppression of Roman Catholic public worship" by William I, Prince of Orange. "Suppression of dioceses," wrote Hove, "takes place only in countries where the faithful and the clergy have been dispersed by persecution," the suppressed dioceses become missions, prefectures, or vicariates apostolic. This is what occurred in the Dutch Republic. (Note: Changes of this nature were not regulated by canon law, according to Hove who wrote in 1909.)

=== Vicariate Apostolic of Batavia ===
The Holland Mission started when the vicariate was erected by Pope Clement VIII in 1592. "For two centuries after the [1648] Peace of Westphalia much of Holland was under vicars apostolic as mission territory, as England was in the same period; although some areas had archpriests dependent on the nuncios in Cologne and Brussels."

== List of diocesans ==
=== Bishops ===
- St. Willibrord (Clemens) (695–739)
- Wera (739?–752/3)
- St. Eoban (753–754)
- St. Gregory of Utrecht (754–775)
- St. Alberic of Utrecht (775–784)
- Theodardus (784–790)
- Hamacarus (790–806)
- Ricfried (806–815/16)
- Frederick of Utrecht (815/16–834/38)
- Alberik II (834/8–845)
- Eginhard (ca. 845)
- Liudger (ca. 848–854)
- St. Hunger (854–866)
- Adalbold I (866–899)
- St. Radboud (899/900–917)
- Balderic (917/8–975/6)
- Folcmar (976–990)
- Baldwin I (991–995)
- St. Ansfried (995–1010)
- Adalbold II (1010–1026)
- Bernold (1026/7–1054)
- William I (1054–1076)
- Conrad (1076–1099)
- Burchard (1100–1112)
- Godbald (1114–1127)
- Andreas van Cuijk (1127/8–1139)
- Hartbert (1139–1150)
- Herman van Horne (1151–1156)
- Godfrey van Rhenen (1156–1178)
- Baldwin II van Holland (1178–1196)
- Arnold I van Isenburg (1196–1197)
- Dirk I van Holland (1197)
- Dirk II van Are (van Ahr) (1197/8–1212)
- Otto I (1212–1215)
- Otto II van Lippe (1216–1227)
- Wilbrand van Oldenburg (1227–1233)
- Otto III van Holland (1233–1249)
- Gozewijn van Amstel (van Randerath) (1249–1250)
- Henry I van Vianden (1250/2–1267)
- John I van Nassau (1267–1290)
- John II van Sierck (1290–1296)
- Willem II Berthout (1296–1301)
- Guy van Avennes (1301–1317)
- Frederik II van Sierck (1317–1322)
- Jacob van Oudshoorn (1322)
- Jan III van Diest (1322–1340)
- Jan IV van Arkel (1342–1364)
- Jan V van Virneburg (1364–1371)
- Arnold II van Hoorn (1371–1379)
- Floris van Wevelinkhoven (1379–1393)
- Frederik III van Blankenheim (1393–1423)
- Rudolf van Diepholt (1423–1455)
- Zweder van Culemborg (1425–1433)
- Walraven van Meurs (1434–1448)
- Gijsbrecht van Brederode (1455–1456)
- David van Bourgondië (1456–1496)
- Frederick IV of Baden (1496–1517)
- Philip of Burgundy (1517–1524)
- Henry of the Palatinate (bishop) (1524–1529)
- Willem III van Enckenvoirt (1529–1534)
- George van Egmond (1534–1559)

=== Archbishops ===
- Frederik V Schenck van Toutenburg (1559–1580)
- Herman van Rennenberg (1580–1592) - not enthroned due to Protestantism
- Jan van Bruhesen (1592–1600) - not enthroned due to Protestantism

== See also ==
- History of religion in the Netherlands
