= Adalbold I =

- Bishop of Utrecht
- Church: Catholic Church
- Diocese: Archdiocese of Utrecht
- In office: 867–898

Personal details
- Died: 898

Adelbold I (or Odilbald) was a bishop of Utrecht from 867/879 to 898.

Just like his predecessors and successors, Adelbold resided in Deventer because Utrecht was still threatened by Viking raids. A few times he acted as arbiter in matters at Cologne. He visited the Synods at Cologne in 873 and 887, and the Synod at Trebur in 895. Adelbold was buried in the St. Salvator Church in Utrecht.

Catholic Church titles
Preceded by Saint Hunger	Bishop of Utrecht; 866–899	Succeeded by Saint Radboud
