= John of Arkel =

Prince-Bishop of Liège

- Prince-Bishop of Liège
- Church: Catholic Church
- Diocese: Liège
- In office: 1364–1378
- Predecessor: Engelbert I von der Mark
- Successor: Arnold II of Horne
- Previous posts: Bishop of Utrecht

Personal details
- Died: 1 July 1378

John of Arkel or Jan van Arkel (died 1 July 1378, Liège) served as Prince and Bishop of Liège from 1364 until his death in 1378. He had previously served as Bishop of Utrecht from 1342 to 1364.

== Biography ==
John was the son of John III, lord of Arkel, and his second wife Kunigonda of Virneburg. After the death of Bishop John of Diest in 1340 there was a problem with the succession. The chapters had elected John of Bronkhorst, but Pope Benedict XII had appointed Nicola Capocci. This was not accepted by the chapters, and Nicola was forced to withdraw. The eventual appointment of John of Arkel as bishop was due to the influence of Count William IV of Holland.

His predecessor had left the Sticht as a semi-protectorate of Holland, and the reign of Jan van Arkel was aimed at removing its dependence on Holland. In this he was very successful, and he also straightened out the bishopric's finances. He was supported in these actions by the city of Utrecht, which understood that without a strong central authority, the minor nobility had free rein, which had resulted in the appearance of robber barons and pirates. The city decided to act independently of Holland, and signed an alliance with the bishop in 1344.

John of Arkel, who had moved to Grenoble in 1343 to save the costs of a household, was called back by his brother and deputy Robert of Arkel in 1345, when Count William IV of Holland decided to deal with the wayward city of Utrecht by sending a large force, besieging the city on 8 July. After eight weeks of siege, Utrecht was forced to recognise the authority of the count of Holland. However, the count was killed two months later, at which the Hook and Cod wars erupted in Holland. Soon the Duchy of Gelderland also became involved in the war, which meant that the Bishopric of Utrecht was left alone for a while.

As a result of the distraction of its neighbouring counties, the position of the diocese became stronger, and new measures against Holland became possible. With support from Utrecht, the Holland towns of Eemnes and IJsselstein were attacked in 1346, and in 1348 the bishop clashed with both Holland and Gelre. All of these actions cost John more than he could pay, and thus he came into trouble. He loaned the entire Oversticht, except for Vollenhove, to Frederick Eese, who had helped him defeat the Zutphen bannerlord Gijsbrecht of Bronkhorst, in order to pay him off. The following year both Vollenhove and the Nedersticht were also given away in loan. Moreover, the Pope sent a mandate to seize John's goods, because he had not paid the Serviti, or papal confirmation tax.

John withdrew to Grenoble again, but in 1351 he returned and regained his position and restored his authority in the diocese. He again acted against the robber barons, and he captured several strategically located castles in Utrecht. Stability within the city was restored by the expulsion of the pro-Holland party of the Gunterlingen. After a final campaign against Holland in 1355–1356, a preliminary peace was signed.

The bishopric was then in a better position than it had been for a long time. The diocese had removed itself from the influence of the count of Holland, and the robber barons had been pacified. However, one of the results was that the city of Utrecht had gained more power in exchange for financial support of John's military operations, which made the city of Utrecht more and more independent.

In 1364, John of Arkel was moved to the Bishopric of Liège by Pope Urban V. Because of the power of the guilds in Liege, he had less power than in Utrecht, though he annexed the County of Loon in 1366. In 1373 he was forced to set up the Tribunal of the XXII. This was a sovereign decision-making court that defended citizens against any unlawful action of the episcopal officials. It previously had a short-lived existence during the reign of Adolph II de la Marck.

After his death, John of Arkel was buried in the Cathedral of Utrecht. Following the Protestant Reformation, parts of his tomb were incorporated in a fence that seals off a chapel named after him.

Because members of the house of Arkel generally had the same name, John, it can be easy to confuse them. Therefore, the bishop John of Arkel is generally referred to as just John, while his namesake family members usually have numerals behind their name to identify them (for example, his father was known as John III of Arkel).

Catholic Church titles
Regnal titles
| Preceded by Jan III van Diest | Bishop of Utrecht as John IV; 1342–1364 | Succeeded by Jan V van Virneburg |
| Preceded by Engelbert I von der Mark | Prince-Bishop of Liège as John V 1364–1378 | Succeeded by Arnold II of Horne |
