= Johannes Gerhardus Rijk Acquoy =

Dutch Protestant theologian (1829–1896)

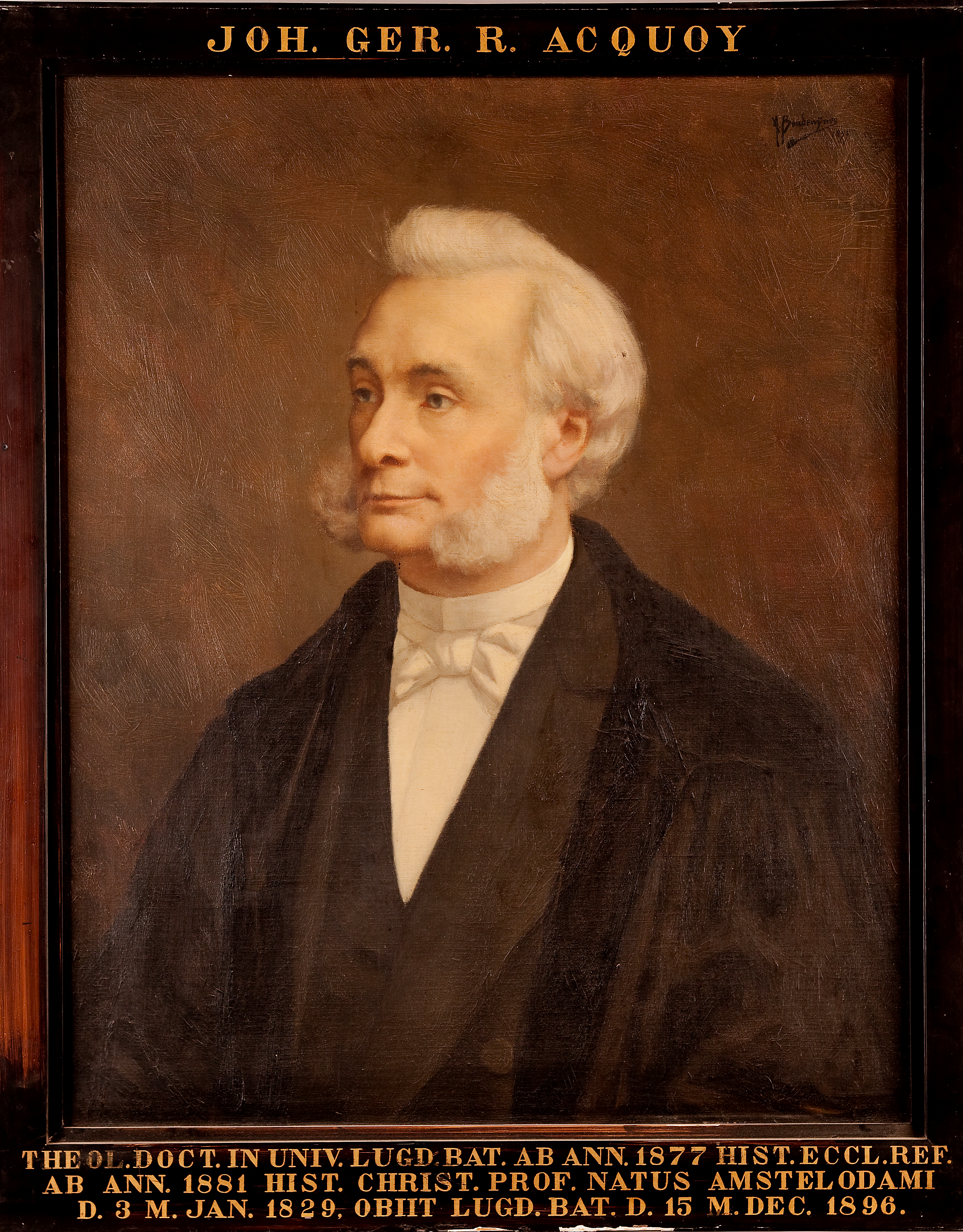
- Portrait of Acquoy by Adriaan Boudewijnse
- Born: 3 September 1829; Amsterdam, Netherlands
- Died: 15 December 1896 (aged 67); Leiden, Netherlands
- Occupation: Theologian

Johannes Gerhardus Rijk Acquoy (3 January 1829 – 15 December 1896) was a Dutch Protestant theologian and church historian.

== Life ==
Johannes Gerhardus Rijk Acquoy was born in Amsterdam on 3 January 1829, the son of Jacobus Acquoy, a self-taught school headmaster and independent scholar, and his wife Maria van den Berg. In 1857, he graduated with his doctorate of philosophy in Leiden. In the 1880s and 1890s, he was a professor of Church History, which Acquoy preferred to call "History of Christianity" at Leiden University. While teaching at the University of Leiden, Acquoy held weekly Privatissimum, exclusive small lectures, in which he taught source criticism and sought to instruct his students in character traits such as truthfulness, in order to train them to be future church historians. Some of his students went on to scholarly work, including Fredrik Pijper, who later took over Acquoy's position as Chair of the History of Church and Dogma at the University of Leiden. Acquoy died in Leiden on 15 December 1896 at the age of 67. At the University of Leiden, Acquoy was close friends with historian Robert Fruin and the two later were buried together in the same grave.

== Selected works ==
- Acquoy, J. G. R. (1870). Herman de Ruyter : Naar uitgegeven en onuitgegeven authentieke documenten [Herman de Ruyter: According to Published and Unpublished Authentic Documents] (in Dutch). 's-Hertogenbosch: Van der Schuyt. OCLC 506960281.
- — (1875). Het klooster te Windesheim en zijn invloed [The Monastery in Windesheim and its Influence] (in Dutch). Amsterdam: Grüner. OCLC 35045471.
- — (1882). Kerkgeschiedenis en geschiedenis van het Christendom [Church History and the History of Christendom] (in Dutch). Leiden: Brill. OCLC 943871102.
- — (1888). Middeleeuwsche geestelijke liederen en leisen, met eene klavier-begeleiding naar den aard hunner tonen (in Dutch). 's-Gravenhage: M. Nijhoff. OCLC 4369682.
