= Gregory of Utrecht =

Frankish bishop and saint

Saint Gregory of Utrecht
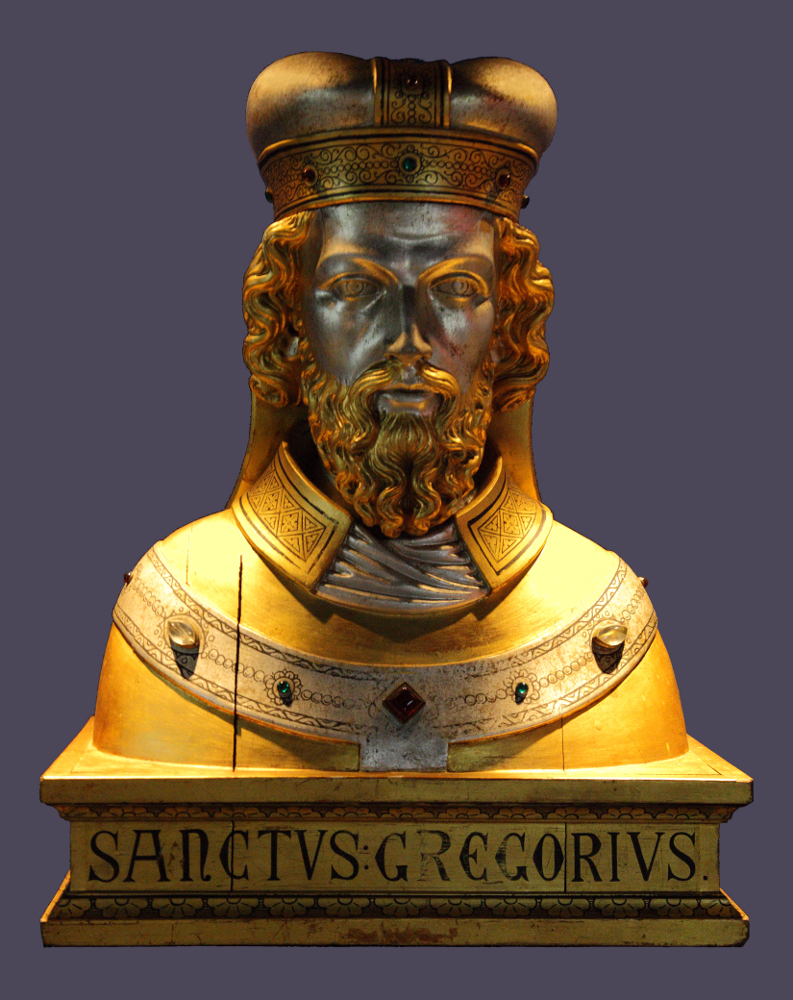

Abbot
- Born: c. 700; Trier
- Died: August 25, 776; Maastricht
- Venerated in: Roman Catholicism; Orthodox Church
- Canonized: Pre-Congregation
- Major shrine: Church of St. Amalberga, Susteren
- Feast: 25 August

Gregory of Utrecht (c. 700/705 – August 25, 776) was born of a noble family at Trier. He became a follower of Saint Boniface, who sent him to study at the Monastery of Saint Michael at Ohrdruf. He then accompanied Boniface on his missionary journeys. In 750, Boniface appointed Gregory abbot of St. Martin's Monastery in Utrecht. St. Martin's became a centre of learning and missionary activity. When, in 754, Eoban left to accompany Boniface on their last missionary trip, Gregory was tasked with administering the diocese of Utrecht, which he did faithfully for the next twenty-three years until his death in 776.

== Life ==
Gregory of Utrecht was born around the year 700 of a noble family at Trier. His father Alberic was the son of Addula, who in her widowhood was Abbess of Pfalzel (Palatiolum) near Trier. (Because of the similarity of names and also because of a forged will, Addula has been frequently confused with Saint Adela of Pfalzel, daughter of Dagobert II of Austrasia, thus wrongly imputing to Gregory membership of the royal house of the Merovingians).

He received his early education at Pfalzel. When, in 722, Boniface passed through Trier on his way from Frisia to Hesse and Thuringia, he stayed at this convent. Abbess Addula called on her fifteen years old grandson to read the scriptures at the meals. Saint Boniface gave an explanation of them and expanded upon the merits of an apostolic life, by which Gregory was inspired to accompany him. When Gregory persisted in his desire to go with Boniface, Addula gave him servants and horses.

He now became a disciple of Boniface, who sent him to the Monastery of Saint Michael at Ohrdruf to continue his studies. Gregory later became Boniface's helper, and accompanied him in all his missionary tours.

== Abbot ==
In 738 Saint Boniface made his third journey to Rome; Gregory went with him and brought back many valuable additions for his library. In 744 Saint Willibrord, the first Bishop of Utrecht, had died but no successor had been named. Boniface had taken charge and had appointed an administrator, Saint Eoban. About 750 Gregory was made Abbot of St. Martin's, in Utrecht. In 754 Boniface started on his last missionary trip accompanied by Eoban, who was to share his martyrdom. After this, Pope Stephen II and Pippin the Younger ordered Gregory to look after the diocese. For this reason he is sometimes called bishop, though he never received episcopal consecration.

The school of his abbey, the Martinsstift, a kind of missionary seminary, was now a centre of learning for many nations: Franks, Frisians, Saxons, even Bavarians and Swabians. England too, though it had splendid schools of its own, sent scholars. Among his disciples, Saint Ludger is perhaps the best known, later to be the first Bishop of Münster and author of the Life of Gregory, in which he describes Gregory's virtues, his contempt of riches, his sobriety, his forgiving spirit and his deeds of alms.

When the murderers of Gregory's two half-brothers were sent to him by the civil magistrates to be put to what death he should think fit, according to the custom of the country at that age, which left the punishment of the assassins to the direction of the relations of the deceased person; he gave every one of them a suit of clothes with an alms, and dismissed them with good advice.

Gregory welcomed Lebuinus of Ripon and entrusted him with the mission of Overijssel on the borders of Westphalia, and gave him Marchelm (or Marcellinus), a disciple of Saint Willibrord, as a companion. In 767 Gregory, who did not wish to receive episcopal consecration himself, sent Alubert, who had come from England to assist him in his missionary work, to York to be consecrated bishop.

Some three years before Gregory's death, paralysis attacked his left side and gradually spread over his entire body. Gregory died at Maastricht on August 25, 776. At the approach of death he had himself carried into church, where he died. He was succeeded by his nephew, Alberic of Utrecht, prior of St. Martin's.

== Veneration ==
His relics were kept at Utrecht, and in 1421 and 1597 were examined at episcopal visitations. A large portion of his head is in the church of Saint Amelberga at Susteren, where an official recognition took place on 25 September 1885 under the supervision of the Bishop of Roermond. A letter written by Saint Lullus, Bishop of Mainz, to Saint Gregory is still extant.

== Sources ==
- Luidgeri vita Gregorii Abbatis Traiectensis, ed. by O. Holder-Egger, Monumenta Germaniae historica, Scriptores (in folio), 15 part 1 (1887), pp. 63–79

Preceded by Eoban	Bishop of Utrecht; 754–775	Succeeded by Alberic of Utrecht
