= Ludger =

Bishop of Munster

Saint Ludger
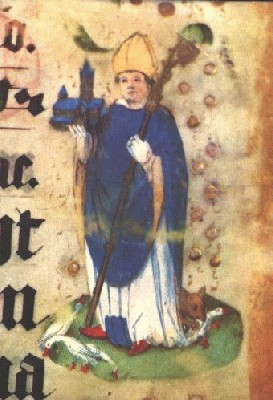
- Saint Ludger from an illuminated manuscript

Apostle of Saxony
- Born: c. 742; Zuilen near Utrecht, Francia
- Died: 26 March 809 (aged 66–67); Billerbeck, Duchy of Saxony
- Venerated in: Orthodox Church; Roman Catholic Church
- Feast: 26 March
- Attributes: Bishop holding a cathedral; reciting his Breviary; with a swan on either side
- Patronage: Groningen, Netherlands, Deventer, Netherlands; East Frisia; diocese of Münster, Germany; Werden, Germany

Ludger (Latin: Ludgerus; also Lüdiger or Liudger) (c. 742 – 26 March 809) was a missionary among the Frisians and Saxons, founder of Werden Abbey and the first Bishop of Münster in Westphalia. He has been called the "Apostle of Saxony".

== Early life to ordination ==
Ludger's parents, Thiadgrim and Liafburg, were wealthy Christian Frisians of noble descent. In 753 Ludger saw the great Apostle of Germany, Boniface, which, together with the subsequent martyrdom of the saint, made a deep impression on him. At his own request he was sent to the Utrecht Cathedral School (Martinsstift), founded by Gregory of Utrecht in 756 or 757, and made good progress. In 767 Gregory, who did not wish to receive episcopal consecration himself, sent Alubert, who had come from England to assist him in his missionary work, to York to be consecrated bishop. Ludger accompanied him to be ordained into the diaconate (as he duly was, by Ethelbert of York) and to study under Alcuin, but after a year he returned to Utrecht. Some time later he was granted an opportunity to continue his studies at York, when he developed a friendship with Alcuin which lasted throughout life.

In 772 friction arose between the Anglo-Saxons and the Frisians, and Ludger - for the sake of his personal safety - left for home, taking with him a number of valuable books. He remained in the Martinsstift until the death of Gregory in 775, in honour of whose memory he wrote the biography Vita Gregorii. He was then sent to Deventer to restore the chapel destroyed by the pagan Saxons and to find the relics of Lebuinus, who had worked there as missionary, built the chapel, and died there in c. 775. Ludger succeeded, and returned to teach in the Martinsstift, after which he and others were sent north to destroy pagan places of worship west of the Lauwers Zee.

== The Netherlands ==
After Ludger had been ordained at Cologne on 7 July 777, the missions of Ostergau (or Ostracha, i.e., East Frisia) were committed to his charge, of which missions Dokkum, the place of the martyrdom of Boniface, was made the centre. Every autumn, however, he came back to Utrecht to teach at the cathedral school. He worked in this way for about seven years, until Widukind in 784 persuaded the Frisians to drive out the missionaries, burn the churches, and return to the pagan gods.

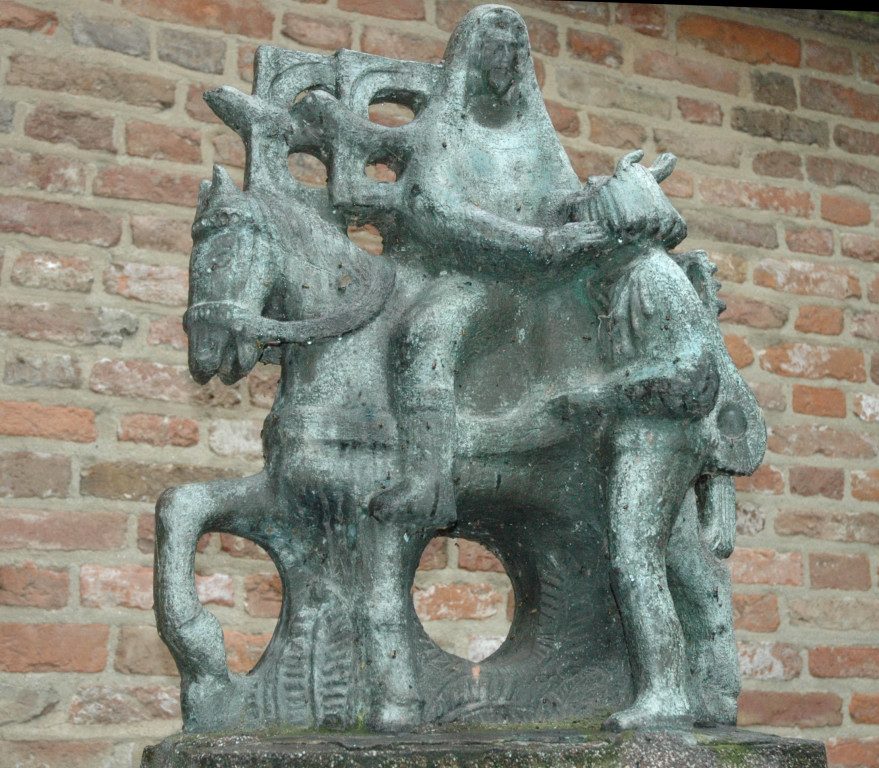
Ludger heals Frisian bard Bernlef from his blindness (statue at Lochem, Gelderland, The Netherlands).

Ludger escaped with his disciples, and in 785 visited Rome, where he was well received by Pope Adrian I, who gave him much advice and special faculties. From Rome he went to Monte Cassino, where he lived according to the Rule of Saint Benedict, but did not bind himself by vows. The news of Widukind's submission, and the arrival of Charlemagne at Monte Cassino in 787, put an end to Ludger's peaceful retirement. He was appointed missionary to five districts east of the river Lauwers, around the estuaries of the Hunze, the Fivel, and the Ems, which were still occupied almost entirely by pagans. He began his work armed with characteristic energy and faith in God, and had a significant advantage in that he knew the language and habits of the people, and put this knowledge to good use in achieving their conversion.

He worked in many places: the island of Bant, long since sunk beneath the sea, is mentioned as the scene of his apostolic work. He visited Heligoland (Fossitesland), where Willibrord had preached, where he destroyed the remains of paganism and built a Christian church. The well, formerly sacred to the pagan gods, he re-dedicated as his baptismal font. On his return he met the blind bard Bernlef, last of the Frisian skalds, allegedly cured his blindness, and made him a devout Christian.

== Westphalia and Saxony ==
In 793 Charlemagne wished to make Ludger Bishop of Trier, but he declined, while declaring himself willing to undertake the evangelization of the Saxons. Charlemagne accepted the offer, and north-western Saxony was thus added to Ludger's missionary field. The monastery of St. Ludger's Abbey at Helmstedt was founded as part of his missionary activity in this part of Germany. To meet necessary expenses the income of the Abbey of Leuze, in the present Belgian province of Hainaut, was given him, and he was told to pick his fellow-workers from the members of that abbey.

As Mimigernaford (also Mimigardeford or Miningarvard) had been designated the centre of the new district, Ludger built a monastery for canons regular there, from which the place took the name of Münster. Here he lived with his monks according to the rule of Saint Chrodegang of Metz, which in 789 had been made obligatory in the Frankish territories. He also built a chapel on the left bank of the Aa in honour of the Blessed Virgin, as well as the churches of Billerbeck, Coesfeld, Hersfeld, Nottuln and others. Near the church of Nottuln he built a home for his sister, Gerburgis, who had consecrated herself to God. Many other women soon joined her, and so originated the first convent in Westphalia (c. 803). Better known among his foundations, however, is the abbey at Werden, founded (after an abortive attempt to establish a religious house at Wichmond on the Erft) in c. 800 and consecrated in 804, on ground which Ludger himself had acquired, in fulfilment of his desire, formed since his stay at Monte Cassino, to found a Benedictine house.

== Later life ==
Alcuin recommended him to Charlemagne, who had Hildebold, Archbishop of Cologne, consecrate Ludger as bishop of Munster on 30 March 805. Ludger's principal concern was to have a good and efficient clergy. To a great extent he educated his students personally, and generally took some of them on his missionary tours. He also founded the monastery of Helmstad, afterwards called Ludger-Clooster, or Ludger's Cloister, in the duchy of Brunswick.

It was said of him that his peaceful methods were far more effective in promoting Christianity than the aggressive tactics of Charlemagne. He was criticised during his life for spending money on alms that should have gone towards the ornamentation of his churches. He suffered thereby, but was able to convince Charlemagne that this was no fault.

== Death and relics ==
On Passion Sunday 809, Ludger heard Mass at Coesfeld early in the morning and preached, then went to Billerbeck, where at 9:00 he again preached, and said his last Mass. That evening he died peacefully in the company of his followers, at the age of sixty-six.

A dispute arose between Münster and Werden for the possession of his remains. His brother Hildegrim was appealed to, and after consultation with the emperor, decided in favour of Werden, where the relics still remain. Portions have, however, since been brought to Münster and Billerbeck.

== Veneration ==
The successive Vitae, beginning with the serious contemporary biographical work of Altfrid and passing through the Vita Secunda and Vita Tertia to the Libellus Monasteriensis de miraculis sancti Liudgeri (The Little Book of Münster on the Miracles of Saint Ludger) of c. 1170, demonstrate the growth of the legend. Votive practice in Münster seems to have focused on a very large and elaborate cross containing a number of relics of the saint. The cult seems to have remained mostly local, and largely to have faded in the later Middle Ages. He is the patron saint of Werden, East Frisia, and Deventer.

Ludger is represented either as a bishop holding a church and a book or as standing between two geese (occasionally described as swans). His feast day is celebrated on 26 March.

== Sources ==
This article includes some information from the German Wikipedia (mostly in German):

- Börsting, Heinrich, Borger, Hugo, Elbern, Victor H.: Sankt Liudger 809-1959. Gedenkschrift zum 1150. Todestage des Heiligen, Essen-Werden 1959
- Börsting, Heinrich and Schröder, Alois (eds): Liudger und sein Erbe, 2 vols (= Westfalia Sacra, Bd.1-2), Münster 1948-1950
- Boser: Am Grabe des hl. Ludger (Münster, 1908).
- Buhlmann, Michael: Liudger an der Ruhr, in: Ich verkünde euch Christus. St. Liudger, Zeuge des Glaubens 742-809 [1998], pp 22–42
- Buhlmann, Michael: Liudger und Karl der Große, in: Ich verkünde euch Christus. St. Liudger, Zeuge des Glaubens 742-809 [2001], pp 5–48
- Buhlmann, Michael: Liudger in den Münsteraner Chroniken des Mittelalters und der frühen Neuzeit, in: Ich verkünde euch Christus. St. Liudger, Zeuge des Glaubens 742-809 [2002], pp 76–100
- Buhlmann, Michael: Liudger und sein bischöfliches Wirken in der Zeit. Sächsischer Missionsbezirk und Münsteraner Bistum Liudgers in der Kirchenorganisation des karolingischen Frankenreichs, in: Seid Zeugen des Glaubens [2005], pp 55–89
- Diekamp, Wilhelm (ed): Die Vitae sancti Liudgeri (= Die Geschichtsquellen des Bistums Münster, Bd.4), Münster 1881
- Ficker, Julius (ed): Die Münsterischen Chroniken des Mittelalters (= Die Geschichtsquellen des Bistums Münster, Bd.1), Münster 1859
- Freise, Eckhard: Vom vorchristlichen Mimigernaford zum "honestum monasterium" Liudgers, in: Geschichte der Stadt Münster, ed F-J Jakobi, Bd.1: Von den Anfängen bis zum Ende des Fürstbistums, Münster, 3rd ed, 1994, pp 1–51
- Freise, Eckhard (ed): Liudger, in: Lexikon des Mittelalters, vol 5, Sp.2038
- Gerchow, Jan (ed): Das Jahrtausend der Mönche. KlosterWelt - Werden 799-1803 (exhibition catalogue), Essen-Köln 1999
- Kaus, Eberhard: Zu den Liudger-Viten des 9. Jahrhunderts, Westfälische Zeitung, 142 (1992), pp 9–55
- Levison, W: England and the Continent in the Eighth Century (1946)
- Löwe, Heinz: Liudger als Zeitkritiker, in: HJb 74 (1955), pp 79–91
- Pingsmann: Der hl. Ludgerus (Freiburg, 1879)
- Revue Bénédictine, III, 107; VII, 412
- Schrade, H: Die vita des hl Liudger und ihre Bilder (1960)
- Senger, Basilius (ed): Liudger in seiner Zeit. Altfrid über Liudger. Liudgers Erinnerungen, Münster, 4th ed, 1986
- Stadler: Heiligenlexikon
- Stühlmeyer, Barbara: Das Liudgeroffizium des Benediktinerklosters Essen Werden (Transkription und Analyse). In: Die Gesänge der Hildegard von Bingen. Eine musikologische, theologische und kulturhistorische Untersuchung. Phil.Diss., Hildesheim: Olms, 2003, ISBN 3-487-11845-9.
- Barbara Stühlmeyer: Liudger, ein Friese, der die Welt verändert. In: Karfunkel. Zeitschrift für erlebbare Geschichte, 61, 2005, S. 107-110, ISSN 0944-2677.
- Stühlmeyer, Ludger: Handschriften im Vergleich: Das Ludgerusoffizium des 12. Jh. in der Abtei Gerleve. In: Curia sonans. Die Musikgeschichte der Stadt Hof. Eine Studie zur Kultur Oberfrankens. Von der Gründung des Bistums Bamberg bis zur Gegenwart. Phil.Diss., Bamberg: Bayerische Verlagsanstalt, Heinrichs-Verlag 2010, ISBN 978-3-89889-155-4.
