= Alberic II of Utrecht =

Bishop of Utrecht

Alberik II
- Bishop of Utrecht
- Church: Catholic Church
- Diocese: Utrecht
- In office: c. 835–844
- Predecessor: Frederick I
- Successor: Eginhard

Alberik II, also Albricus or Alfrik, was Bishop of Utrecht from around 835 to 844.

Alberik was the brother of his predecessor Frederick of Utrecht. Nothing is known about his administration. He was buried in the Saint Salvatorchurch in Utrecht.

Preceded by Frederick I	Bishop of Utrecht c. 835–844	Succeeded by Eginhard
