= List of state leaders in the 12th-century Holy Roman Empire =

This is a list of state leaders in the 12th century (1101–1200) AD, of the Holy Roman Empire. Holy Roman Empire in Germany

== Main ==
- Holy Roman Empire, Kingdom of Germany (complete list, complete list) –

- Henry IV, Holy Roman Emperor (1084–1105), King (1053–1087)
- Henry V, Holy Roman Emperor (1111–1125), King (1099–1125)
- Lothair II, Holy Roman Emperor (1133–1137), King (1125–1137)
- Conrad III, King (1138–1152)
- Henry Berengar, co-King (1138–1150)
- Frederick I, Holy Roman Emperor (1155–1190), King (1152–1190)
- Henry VI, Holy Roman Emperor (1191–1197), King (1190–1197)
- Philip, King (1198–1208)
- Otto IV, Holy Roman Emperor (1209–1215), King (1198–1209)

== Austrian ==
- Margraviate/ Duchy of Austria (complete list) –

- Leopold III the Good, Margrave (1095–1136)
- Leopold the Generous, Margrave (1137–1141)
- Henry II Jasomirgott, Margrave (1141–1156), Duke (1156–1177)
- Leopold V the Virtuous, Duke (1177–1194)
- Frederick I the Catholic, Duke (1195–1198)
- Leopold VI the Glorious, Duke (1198–1230)

- County of Bregenz (complete list) –

- Rudolf I, Couint (1097–1160)

- Prince-Bishopric of Brixen (complete list) –

- Hugo, Prince-bishop (1100–1125)
- Reginbert, Prince-bishop (1125/29, 1138–1140)
- Hartmann of Brixen, Prince-bishop (1140–1164)
- Otto of Andechs, Prince-bishop (1165–1170)
- Heinrich of Fugen, Prince-bishop (1170–1173/74)
- Richer of Hohenburg, Prince-bishop (1173/74–1177)
- Heinrich of Berchtesgaden, Prince-bishop (1177–1196)
- Eberhard of Regensberg, Prince-bishop (1196/98–1200)
- Konrad of Rodank, Prince-bishop (1200–1216)

- Margraviate of Burgau –

- Heinrich I. von Burgau, Margrave (?–1241)
- Heinrich II. von Burgau, Margrave (?–1293/94)
- Heinrich III. von Burgau, Margrave (?–c.1301)

- Duchy of Carinthia (complete list) –

- Henry IV, Duke (1090–1122)
- Henry IV, Duke (1122–1123 )
- Engelbert, Duke (1123–1134)
- Ulrich I, Duke (1134–1144)
- Henry V, Duke (1144–1161)
- Herman, Duke (1161–1181)
- Ulrich II, Duke (1181–1201)

- Prince-Bishopric of Chur (complete list) –

- Ulrich III von Tegerfelden, Prince-bishop (1170–1179)
- Bruno von Ehrenfels, Prince-bishop (1179–1180)
- Henry II, Prince-bishop (1180–1193)
- Arnold II, Prince-bishop (1210–1221)
- Rudolf II, Prince-bishop (1223–1226)
- Berthold, Prince-bishop (1226–1233)
- Ulrich IV, Prince-bishop (1233–1237)
- Volcnand, Prince-bishop (1238–1251)
- Heinrich von Höwen, Prince-bishop (1441−?)
- Ulrich III. von Tegerfelden, Prince-bishop (1170–1179)
- Bruno von Ehrenfels, Prince-bishop (1179–1180)
- Heinrich II., Prince-bishop (1180–1194)
- Reinher della Torre, Prince-bishop (1194–1209)

- County of Gorizia (complete list) –

- Meinhard I, Count (1122–1142)
- Henry II, Count (1142–1150)
- Engelbert II, Count (1150–1191)
- Engelbert III, Count (1191–1220)

- March/ Duchy of Styria (complete list) –

- Ottokar II, Margrave (1082–1122)
- Leopold, Margrave (1122–1129)
- Ottokar III, Margrave (1129–1164)
- Ottokar IV, Margrave (1164–1180), Duke (1180–1192)
- Leopold V of Austria, Duke (1192–1194)
- Leopold VI of Austria, Duke (1194–1230)

- Prince-Bishopric of Trent (complete list) –

- Adalberon, Prince-bishop (1084–1106)
- Gebhard, Prince-bishop (1106–1120)
- Albert I, Prince-bishop (1120–1124)
- Altmann, Prince-bishop (1124–1149)
- Arnold II, Prince-bishop (1149–1154)
- Eberhard, Prince-bishop (1154–1156)
- St. Albert II, Prince-bishop (1156–1177)
- Salomon, Prince-bishop (1177–1183)
- Albert III di Madruzzo, Prince-bishop (1184–1188)
- Conrad II di Biseno, Prince-bishop (1188–1205)

- County of Tyrol (complete list) –

- Albert I, Count (?–1078)
- Albert II, Count (1055–1101)
- Albert III, Count (1101–1165)
- Berthold I, Count (1165–1180)
- Berthold II, Count (1180–1181)
- Henry I, Count (1180–1202)

== Bavarian ==
- Duchy of Bavaria (complete list) –

- Welf I, Duke (1070–1077, 1096–1101)
- Welf II, Duke (1101–1120)
- Henry IX the Black, Duke (1120–1126)
- Henry X, Duke (1126–1138)
- Leopold I, Duke (1139–1141)
- Henry XI Jasomirgott, Duke (1143–1156)
- Henry XII the Lion, Duke (1156–1180)
- Otto the Redhead, Duke (1180–1183)
- Agnes of Loon, Regent (1183–1191)
- Louis I, Duke (1183–1231)

- Berchtesgaden Prince-Provostry (complete list) –

- Bernhard I of Schönstätten, Provost (1194–1201)

- Landgraviate of Leuchtenberg (de:complete list) –

- Gebhardt I, Landgrave (?–1146)
- Gebhardt II, Landgrave (1146–1168)
- Diepold I, Landgrave (1168–1209)

- Prince-Abbey of Niedermünster (complete list) –

- Uda II von Marburg, Abbess (1089–1103)
- Richenza II von Zolling, Abbess (1103–1109)
- Mathilde II von Kirchberg, Abbess (1109–1116)
- Richenza III von Abensberg, Abbess (1116–1126)
- Richenza IV von Dornburg, Abbess (1126–1130)
- Heilka III von Kirchberg, Abbess (1130–1136)
- Kunigunde II von Kirchberg, Abbess (1136–1177)
- Tutta II von Falkenstein, Abbess (1177–1180)
- Adelheid I von Wolffershausen, Abbess (1180–1190)
- Bertha von Frontenhausen, Abbess (1190–1197)
- Heilka IV von Rotheneck, Abbess (1197–1218)

- Margraviate of the Nordgau (complete list) –

- Diepold III, Margrave (1093–1146)

- Imperial County of Ortenburg (complete list) –

- Rapoto I, Count (1120–1186)
- Rapoto II, Count (1186–1231)

- Pappenheim (complete list) –

- Henry III, Lord (early 12th century)
- Ernest, Lord (?–1170)
- Henry I, Lord (1170–1193)
- Rudolph I, Lord (1193–1221)

- Prince-Bishopric of Passau (complete list) –

- Ulrich, Prince-Bishop (1092–1121)
- Reginmar, Prince-Bishop (1121–1138)
- Reginbert of Hagenau, Prince-Bishop (1138–1147/48)
- Conrad I of Babenberg, Prince-Bishop (1148/1149–1164)
- Rupert I, Prince-Bishop (1164–1165)
- Albo, Prince-Bishop (1165–1169)
- Henry I of Berg, Prince-Bishop (1169–1172)
- Diepold of Berg, Prince-Bishop (1172–1190)
- Wolfger of Erla, Prince-Bishop (1191–1204)

- Prince-Bishopric of Regensburg (complete list) –

- Heinrich I of Wolfratshausen, Prince-bishop (1132–1155)
- Hartwig II of Ortenburg, Prince-bishop (1155–1164)
- Eberhard the Swabian, Prince-bishop (1165–1167)
- Konrad II of Raitenbuch, Prince-bishop (1167–1185)
- Konrad III of Laichling, Prince-bishop (1186–1204)

- Prince-Archbishopric of Salzburg (complete list) –

- Eberhard II of Regensburg, Prince-archbishop (1200–1246)

== Bohemian ==
- Duchy/ Kingdom of Bohemia (complete list) –

- Bořivoj II, Duke (1100–1107, 1117–1120)
- Svatopluk the Lion, Duke (1107–1109)
- Vladislaus I, Duke (1109–1117, 1120–1125)
- Sobeslaus I, Duke (1125–1140)
- Vladislaus II, Duke (1140–1158), King (1158–1172)
- Frederick, Duke (1172–1173, 1178–1189)
- Sobeslaus II, Duke (1173–1178)
- Conrad II Otto, Duke (1189–1191)
- Wenceslaus II, Duke (1191–1192)
- Bretislaus III, Duke (1193–1197)
- Vladislaus III Henry, Duke (1197)
- Ottokar I, Duke (1192–1193, 1197–1198), King (1198–1230)

- Margraviate of Moravia (complete list) –

- Conrad II Otto, Margrave (1182–1189)
- Vladislaus I Henry, Margrave (1197–1222)

== Burgundian-Low Countries ==
- County of Burgundy (complete list) –

- William II the German, Count (1097–1125)
- William III the Child, Count (1125–1127)
- Stephen I the Rash, Count (1097–1102)
- Reginald III, Count (1102–1148)
- Beatrice I, Countess (1148–1184)
- Frederick Barbarossa, Count (1156–1190)
- Otto I, Count (1190–1200)
- Joan I, Countess (1200–1205)

- Landgraviate/ Duchy of Brabant(complete list) –

- Godfrey I, Landgrave (1095–1139)
- Henry III, Landgrave (1085/1086–1095)
- Godfrey I, Landgrave (1095–1139)
- Godfrey II, Landgrave (1139–1142)
- Godfrey III, Landgrave (1142–1190)
- Henry I, Duke (1183/1184–1235)

- County of Flanders (complete list) –

- Robert II, Count (1093–1111)
- Baldwin VII Hapkin, Count (1111–1119)
- Charles I the Good, Count (1119–1127)
- William I Clito, Count (1127–1128)
- Theodoric, Count (1128–1168)
- Philip I, Count (1168–1191)
- Margaret I, Countess (1191–1194)
- Baldwin VIII, Count (1191–1194)
- Baldwin IX, Count (1194–1205)

- County of Hainaut (complete list) –

- Baldwin III, Count (1098–1120)
- Baldwin IV, Count (1120–1171)
- Baldwin V, Count (1171–1195)
- Baldwin VI, Count (1195–1205)

- County of Holland (complete list) –

- Floris II, Count (1091–1121)
- Dirk VI, Count (1121–1157)
- Floris III, Count (1157–1190)
- Dirk VII, Count (1190–1203)

- County/ Duchy of Limburg (complete list) –

- Henry I, Count (1082–1119)
- Waleran II, Duke (1119–1139)
- Henry II, Duke (1139–1167)
- Henry III, Duke (1165–1221)

- Duchy of Lower Lorraine (complete list) –

- Henry I, Duke (1101–1106)
- Godfrey VI/I, Duke (1106–1128)
- Waleran, Duke (1128–1139)
- Godfrey VII/II, Duke (1139–1142)
- Godfrey VIII/VIII, Duke (1142–1190)

title passes to the Duke of Brabant

- County of Namur (complete list) –

- Albert III, Count (1063–1102)
- Godfrey I, Count (1102–1139)
- Henry I the Blind, Count (1139–1189)
- Alice, Countess, Baldwin I, Margrave (1189–1195)
- Philip I, Margrave (1195–1212)

== Franconian ==
- County of Castell (complete list) –

- Rupert I, Count (1200–1223)

- Prince-Bishopric of Würzburg (complete list) –

- Herold von Hochheim, Prince-bishop (1168–1170)
- Reginhard von Abenberg, Prince-bishop (1171–1186)
- Gottfried I von Spitzenberg-Helfenstein, Prince-bishop (1186–1190)
- Philip of Swabia, Prince-bishop (1190–1191)
- Heinrich III of Berg, Prince-bishop (1191–1197)
- Gottfried II von Hohenlohe, Prince-bishop (1197)
- Konrad von Querfurt, Prince-bishop (1197–1202)

== Electoral Rhenish ==
- Archbishopric of Cologne (complete list) –

- Friedrich I, Prince-Archbishop (1100–1131)
- Bruno II von Berg, Prince-Archbishop (1131–1137)
- Hugo von Sponheim, Prince-Archbishop (1137)
- Arnold I, Prince-Archbishop (1138–1151)
- Arnold II von Wied, Prince-Archbishop (1152–1156)
- Friedrich II von Berg, Prince-Archbishop (1156–1158)
- Rainald of Dassel, Prince-Archbishop (1159–1167)
- Philipp von Heinsberg, Prince-Archbishop (1167–1191)
- Bruno III von Berg, Prince-Archbishop (1191–1192)
- Adolf I von Berg, Prince-Archbishop (1192–1205)

- Prince-Bishopric of Mainz (complete list) –

- Rudhart, Prince-archbishop (1088–1109)
- Adalbert I von Saarbrücken, Prince-archbishop (1111–1137)
- Adalbert II von Saarbrücken, Prince-archbishop (1138–1141)
- Markholf, Prince-archbishop (1141–1142)
- Henry I, Prince-archbishop (1142–1153)
- Arnold von Selenhofen, Prince-archbishop (1153–1160)
- Christian I, Prince-archbishop (1160–1161)
- Rudolf of Zähringen, opposing Prince-archbishop (1160–1161)
- Conrad I of Wittelsbach, Prince-archbishop (1161–1165)
- Christian I, Prince-archbishop (1165–1183)
- Conrad I of Wittelsbach (restored), Prince-archbishop (1183–1200)
- Luitpold von Scheinfeld, Prince-archbishop (1200–1208)

- County Palatine of the Rhine (complete list) –

- Siegfried of Ballenstedt, Count (1095–1113)
- Gottfried von Calw, Count (1113–1129)
- William of Ballenstedt, Count (1129–1139)
- Henry IV Jasomirgott, Count (1139–1142)
- Hermann III of Stahleck, Count (1142–1155)
- Conrad of Hohenstaufen, Count (1156–1195)
- Henry V, Count (1195–1213)

- Elector-Bishopric of Trier (complete list) –

- Egilbert, Prince-bishop (1079–1101)
- Bruno, Prince-bishop (1101–1124)
- Gottfrid, Prince-bishop (1124–1127)
- Meginher, Prince-bishop (1127–1130)
- Albero de Montreuil, Prince-bishop (1131–1152)
- Hillin of Falmagne, Prince-bishop (1152–1169)
- Arnold I of Vaucourt, Prince-bishop (1169–1183)
- Folmar of Karden, Prince-bishop (1183–1189)
- John I, Archbishop-elector (1189–1212)

== Lower Rhenish–Westphalian ==
- County of Bentheim (complete list) –

- Otto of Salm, Count (1115–1149)
- Sophia, Countess (1149–1176) and Dirk of Holland, Count (1149–1157)
- Otto I, Count (1176–1207)

- Duchy of Cleves (complete list) –

- Dietrich I, Count (1092–1119)
- Arnold I, Count (1119–1147)
- Dietrich II, Count (1147–1172)
- Dietrich III, Count (1172–1188)
- Dietrich IV, Count (1188–1198)
- Arnold II, Count (1198–1201)

- Essen Abbey (complete list) –

- Lutgarde, Princess-Abbess (c.1088–1118)
- Oda, Princess-Abbess (1119–1137)
- Ermentrude, Princess-Abbess (c.1140–post-1154)
- Hedwig von Wied, Princess-Abbess (1154–c.1172)
- Elisabeth I, Princess-Abbess (1172–pre-1216)

- County of Guelders (complete list) –

- Gerard I, Count (pre-1096–c.1129)
- Gerard II, Count (1129–c.1131)
- Henry I, Count (c.1131–1182)
- Otto I, Count (1182–1207)

- Herford Abbey (complete list) –

- Jutta of Arnsberg, Abbess (1147–post-1162)
- Ludgard I, Abbess (pre-1163–post-1170)

- Prince-Bishopric of Liège (complete list) –

- Otbert, Prince-Bishop (1091–1119)
- Frederick of Namur, Prince-Bishop (1119–1121)
- Albero I of Leuven, Prince-Bishop (1122–1128)
- Alexander I, Prince-Bishop (1128–1135)
- Albero II of Chiny-Namur, Prince-Bishop (1135–1145)
- Henry II of Leez, Prince-Bishop (1145–1164)
- Alexander II, Prince-Bishop (1164–1167)
- Rudolf of Zähringen, Prince-Bishop (1167–1191)
- Saint Albert of Leuven, Prince-Bishop (1191–1192)
- Lothaire of Hochstaden, Prince-Bishop (1192–1193)
- Simon of Limbourg, Prince-Bishop (1193–1195)
- Albert of Cuyck, Prince-Bishop (1195–1200)
- Hugh of Pierrepont, Prince-Bishop (1200–1229)

- County of Luxemburg (complete list) –

- William I, Count (1096–1131)
- Conrad II, Count (1131–1136)
- Henry IV, Count (1136–1189)
- Otto, Count (1196–1197)
- Ermesinde, Countess (1197–1247)

- County of Mark (complete list) –

- Eberhard I, Count (1160–1180)
- Frederick I, Count (1180–1198)
- Adolph I, Count (1198–1249)

- Prince-Bishopric of Münster (complete list) –

- Hermann II of Katzenelnbogen, Prince-bishop (1180–1202)

- County of Oldenburg (complete list) –

- Elimar I, Count (1101–1108)
- Elimar II, Count (1108–1143)
- Christian I the Quarrelsome, Count (1143–1168)
- Maurice I, Count (1168–1211)

- County of Sayn (complete list) –

- Eberhard I, Count (1139–1176)
- Godfrey II/III of Sponheim, Regent, (1181–1220)
- Henry I/II, co-Count (1176–1203)
- Eberhard II, co-Count (1176–1202)

- County of Schaumburg (complete list) –

- Adolf I, Count (1106–1130)
- Adolf II, Count (1130–1164)
- Adolf III, Count (1164–1225)

- Prince-Bishopric of Utrecht (complete list) –

- Burchard, Prince-bishop (1100–1112)
- Godbald, Prince-bishop (1114–1127)
- Andreas van Cuijk, Prince-bishop (1127/28–1139)
- Hartbert, Prince-bishop (1139–1150)
- Herman van Horne, Prince-bishop (1151–1156)
- Godfrey van Rhenen, Prince-bishop (1156–1178)
- Baldwin II van Holland, Prince-bishop (1178–1196)
- Arnold I van Isenburg, Prince-bishop (1196–1197)
- Dirk I, Prince-bishop (1197)
- Dirk II van Are), Prince-bishop (1197/98–1212)

- Prince-Bishopric of Verden (complete list) –

- Tammo of Verden, Prince-Bishop (1180–1188)
- Rudolph of Verden, Prince-Bishop (1189–1205)

- County of Wied (complete list) –

- Richwin IV, Count (1093–1112)
- Matfried III, Count (1093–1129)
- Burchard, Count (?–1152)
- Siegfried, Count (1129–c.1161)
- Dietrich/Theodoric, Count (c.1162–c.1197)
- George, Count (1197–1219)

== Upper Rhenish ==
- County of Bar (complete list) –

- Theodoric II, Count (1093–1105)
- Reginald I, Count (1105–1150)
- Reginald II, Count (1150–1170)
- Henry I, Count (1170–1189)
- Theobald I, Count (1189–1214)

- Prince-Bishopric of Basel (complete list) –

- Burchard of Basle, Prince-bishop (1072–1105)
- Rudolf IV von Homburg, Prince-bishop (1107–1122)
- Berthold von Neuenburg, Prince-bishop (1122–1133)
- Adalbert IV. von Froburg, Prince-bishop (1133–1137)
- Ortlieb von Froburg, Prince-bishop (1138–1164)
- Ludwig Garewart, Prince-bishop (1164–1179)
- Hugo von Hasenburg, Prince-bishop (1180)
- Heinrich I von Horburg, Prince-bishop (1180–1191)
- Leuthold I von Rotheln, Prince-bishop (1192–1213)

- Isenburg-Covern (complete list) –

- Gerlach II, Count (1158–1217)

- Isenburg-Isenburg (complete list) –

- Rembold IV, Count (1137–1162)
- Rembold V, Count (1152–1195)
- Bruno I, Count (1152–1199)

- Isenburg-Kempenich (complete list) –

- Siegfried, Count (1142–1153)
- Reynold, Count (1153–?)
- Theodoric I and Florentin, Count (12th century)
- Salentin and Rosemann, Count (12th/13th century)

- County of Leiningen (de:complete list) –

- Emich I, Count (fl.1127),
- Emich II, Count (fl.1143) to 1179
- Friedrich, Count (fl.1189)
- Emich III, Count (fl.1193–1208)

- Duchy of Lorraine (complete list) –

- Theodoric II, Duke (1070–1115)
- Simon I, Duke (1115–1138)
- Matthias I, Duke (1138–1176)
- Simon II, Duke (1176–1205)

- County of Nassau-Saarbrücken (complete list) –

- Siegbert, Count (1080–1105)
- Frederick, Count (1105–1135)
- Simon I, Count (1135–1182)
- Simon II, Count (1182–1207)

- Salm (complete list) –

- Andrea II, Count (1088–1138)
- Herman, Count (1138–1140)
- Henry, Count (1140–1165)

- Lower Salm (complete list) –

- Frederick I, Count (1163–1172)
- Frederick II, Count (1172–1210)

- Upper Salm (complete list) –

- Henry I, Count (1165–1210)

- Prince-Bishopric of Sion (complete list) –

- Vilencus, Prince-Bishop (1107–1116)
- Boson, Prince-Bishop (1135–1138)
- Guarinus of Sitten, Prince-Bishop (1138–1150)
- Louis, Prince-Bishop (1150–c.1162)
- Amédée of La Tour, Prince-Bishop (1162–c.1168)
- Guillaume of Blonay, Prince-Bishop (1176–1177)
- Conon, Prince-Bishop (1179–1181/84)
- Guillaume of Candie, Prince-Bishop (c.1184–1196)
- Nantelme of Écublens, Prince-Bishop (1196–1203)

- Prince-Bishopric of Speyer (complete list) –

- Johann I of Kraichgau, Prince-bishop (1090–1104)
- Gebhard II of Urach, Prince-bishop (1105–1107)
- Bruno of Saarbrücken, Prince-bishop (1107–1123)
- Arnold II, Prince-bishop (1124–1126)
- Siegfried I, Prince-bishop (1127–1146)
- Günther, Prince-bishop (1146–1161)
- Ulrich I of Dürrmenz, Prince-bishop (1161–1163)
- Gottfried II, Prince-bishop (1164–1167)
- Rabodo, Count of Lobdaburg, Prince-bishop (1167–1176)
- Konrad II, Prince-bishop (1176–1178)
- Ulrich II of Rechberg, Prince-bishop (1178–1187)
- Otto II, Count of Henneberg, Prince-bishop (1187–1200)
- Conrad III of Scharfenberg, Prince-bishop (1200–1224)

- Prince-Bishopric of Strasbourg (complete list) –

- Kuno, Prince-Bishop (1100–1123)
- Bruno von Hochberg, Prince-Bishop (1123–1126)
- Eberhard, Prince-Bishop (1126–1127)
- Bruno von Hochberg, Prince-Bishop (1129–1131)
- Gebhard von Urach, Prince-Bishop (1131–1141)
- Burkhard I, Prince-Bishop (1141–1162)
- Rudolf, Prince-Bishop (1162–1179)
- Konrad I, Prince-Bishop (1179–1180)
- Heinrich I von Hasenburg, Prince-Bishop (1181–1190)
- Konrad II von Hühnenburg, Prince-Bishop (1190–1202)

- Prince-Bishopric of Worms (complete list) –

- Adalbert II of Saxony, Prince-bishop (1070–1107)
- Erzo, Prince-bishop (1107–115)
- Arnold II, Prince-bishop (1110–1131)
- Burchard II von Asorn, Prince-bishop (1120–1149)
- Konrad I von Steinach, Prince-bishop (1150–1171)
- Konrad II von Sternberg, Prince-bishop (1171–1192)
- Henryk I van Maastricht, Prince-bishop (1192–1195)
- Luitpold von Schonfeld, Prince-bishop (1196–1217)

== Lower Saxon ==
- Duchy of Saxony (complete list) –

- Magnus, Duke (1072–1106)
- Lothair I, Duke (1106–1137)
- Henry II the Proud, Duke (1137–1139)
- Albert I the Bear, Duke (1139–1142)
- Henry III the Lion, Duke (1142–1180)
- Bernhard, Duke (1180–1212)

- Prince-Archbishopric of Bremen (complete list) –

- Siegfried of Anhalt, Prince-archbishop (1180–1184)
- Hartwig II, Prince-archbishop (1185–1190)
- Valdemar of Denmark, Prince-archbishop (1192)
- Hartwig II, Prince-archbishop (1192–1207)

- Gandersheim Abbey (complete list) –

- Adelheid III, Princess-Abbess (1096–1104)
- Frederun, Princess-Abbess (1104–1111)
- Agnes I, Princess-Abbess (1111–1125)
- Bertha I, Princess-Abbess (1126–1130)
- Liutgard II, Princess-Abbess (1130/31–1152)
- Adelheid IV, Princess-Abbess (1152/53–1184)
- Adelheid V, Princess-Abbess (1184–1196)
- Mechthild I, Princess-Abbess (1196–1223)

- County of Holstein (complete list) –

- Adolf I, Count (1111–1130)
- Adolf II, Count (1130–1137, 1143–1164)
- Henry of Badewide, Count (1137–1143)
- Matilda of Schwarzburg-Käfernburg, Regent (1164–c.1174)
- Adolf III, Count (1164–1203)

- Prince-bishopric of Lübeck (complete list) –

- Henry I, Prince-bishop (1180–1182)
- Conrad II, Prince-bishop (1183–1184)
- Theodoric I, Prince-bishop (1186–1210)

- Prince-Archbishopric of Magdeburg (complete list) –

- Wichmann von Seeburg, Prince-bishop (1180–1192)
- Ludolf of Koppenstedt, Prince-archbishop (1192–1205)

- Mecklenburg (complete list) –

- Pribislav, Prince of Obotrites (1160–1167), Prince of Mecklenburg (1167–1178)
- Nicholas I, co-Lord (1178–1200)
- Henry Borwin I, co-Lord (1178–1219)

- Obotrites (complete list) –

- Henry, Prince (1093–1127)
- Niklot, Prince (1131–1160)
- Pribislav, Prince of Obotrites (1160–1167), Prince of Mecklenburg (1167–1178)

- County of Oldenburg (complete list) –

- Elimar I, Count (1101–1108)
- Elimar II, Count (1108–1143)
- Christian I the Quarrelsome, Count (1143–1168)
- Maurice I, Count (1168–1211)

== Upper Saxon ==
- County of Anhalt (complete list) –

- Otto I the Rich, Count (1076/83–1123)
- Albert I the Bear, Count (1123–1170)
- Bernhard, Count (1170–1212)

- Prince-Bishopric of Brandenburg (complete list) –

- Wilmar, Prince-bishop (1161/65–1173)
- Siegfried I, Prince-bishop (1173–1179)

- Margraviate of Brandenburg (complete list) –

- Albert I the Bear, Margrave (1157–1170)
- Otto I, Margrave (1170–1184)
- Otto II the Generous, Margrave (1184–1205)

- Eastern March (complete list) –

- Henry I, Margrave (1075–1103)
- Henry II, Margrave (1103–1123)
- Wiprecht, Margrave (1123–1124)
- Albert, Margrave (1123–1128)
- Henry III, Margrave (1128–1135)

hereafter known as March of Lusatia

- Hevelli –

- Meinfried, Prince (?–1127)
- Pribislav-Henry, Prince (?–1150)

- Margravate of Meissen (complete list) –

- Henry I, Margrave (1089–1103)
- Thimo, Margrave (1103)
- Henry II, Margrave (1104–1123)
- Wiprecht, Margrave (1123–1124)
- Herman II, Margrave (1124–1130)
- Conrad, Margrave (1130–1156)
- Otto II, Margrave (1156–1190)
- Albert I, Margrave (1190–1195)
- Dietrich I, Margrave (1198–1221)

- Northern March (complete list) –

- Lothair Udo III, Margrave (1087–1106)
- Rudolf I, Margrave (1106–1112)
- Helperich von Plötzkau, Margrave (1112–1114)
- Henry II, Margrave (1114–1128)
- Udo IV, Margrave (1128–1130)
- Conrad, Margrave (1130–1133)
- Rudolf II, Margrave (1133–1134)
- Albert the Bear, Margrave (1134–1170)

- Duchy of Pomerania (complete list) –

- Świętobor, non-dynastic Duke (1060–1106)
- Świętopełk I, non-dynastic Duke (1106–1113)
- Wartislaw I, Duke (1120s–1135)
- Racibor I, Duke (1135–1156)

- Duchy of Pomerelia (complete list) –

- Świętobor, Duke (c.1100)
- Swietopelk I, Duke (1109/13–1121)
- Sobieslaw I, Duke (1150s–1177/79)
- Sambor I, Duke (1177/79–1205)

- Pomerania-Demmin (complete list) –

- Casimir I, Duke (1156–1180)
- Wartislaw II, Duke (1180–1184)
- Bogusław I, Duke of Pomerania-Stettin (1156–1187), of Pomerania-Demmin (1184–1187)
- Anastasia of Greater Poland, Regent (1187–1208)
- Casimir II, Duke (1187–1219)

- Pomerania-Schlawe-Stolp (complete list) –

- Swietopelk Raciborovic, Duke (1156–c.1190)
- Bogislaw III., Duke (c.1190–1223)'

- Pomerania-Stettin (complete list) –

- Bogusław I, Duke of Pomerania-Stettin (1156–1187), of Pomerania-Demmin (1184–1187)
- Anastasia of Greater Poland, Regent (1187–1208)
- Bogislaw II, Duke (1187–1220)

- Landgraviate of Thuringia (complete list) –

- Louis the Springer, Count (1056–1123)
- Louis I, Count (1123–1131), Landgrave (1131–1140)
- Louis II the Iron, Landgrave (1140–1172)
- Louis III the Pious, Landgrave (1172–1190)
- Hermann I the Hard, Landgrave (1190–1217)

== Swabian ==
- Duchy of Swabia (complete list) –

- Frederick I, contested Duke (1079–1105)
- Frederick II the One-Eyed, Duke (1105–1147)
- Frederick III Barbarossa, Duke (1147–1152)
- Frederick IV, Duke (1152–1167)
- Frederick V, Duke (1167–1170)
- Frederick VI, Duke (1170–1191)
- Conrad II, Duke (1191–1196)
- Philip, Duke (1196–1208)

- Prince-Bishopric of Augsburg (complete list) –

- Hermann of Vohburg, Prince-bishop (1096–1133)
- Walter I of Dillingen, Prince-bishop (1133–1152)
- Konrad of Hirscheck, Prince-bishop (1152–1167)
- Hartwig I of Lierheim, Prince-bishop (1167–1184)
- Udalschalk, Prince-bishop (1184–1202)

- Margraviate of Baden (complete list) –

- Herman II, Margrave (1073–1130)
- Herman III the Great, Margrave (1130–1160)
- Herman IV, Margrave (1160–1190)

- Margraviate of Baden-Baden (complete list) –

- Herman V, Margrave (1190–1243)

- Margraviate of Baden-Hachberg (complete list) –

- Henry I, Margrave (1190–1231)

- Prince-Bishopric of Constance (complete list) –

- Hermann von Arbon, Prince-bishop (1155–1165)
- Otto von Habsburg, Prince-bishop (1165–1174)
- Berthold von Bußnang, Prince-bishop (1174–1183)
- Hermann von Friedingen, Prince-bishop (1183–1189)
- Diethelm von Krenkingen, Prince-bishop (1190–1206)

- Ellwangen Abbey (complete list) –

- Adalger, Prince-abbot (c.1100)
- Ebo, Prince-abbot (?–1113)
- Richardus Rufus?, Prince-abbot (c.1120)
- Helmerich, Prince-abbot (c.1124)
- Adalbert I of Ronsberg, Prince-abbot (1136?–1173)
- Adalbert II of Künsberg?, Prince-abbot (1173–1188)
- Kuno, Prince-abbot (1188–1221)

- County of Hohenberg (complete list) –

- Burkhard III, Count (post-1152–post-1193)
- Friedrich, Count (post-1193–1195)
- Burkhard IV, Count (1195–1217/25)

- Princely Abbey of Kempten (complete list) –

- Eberhard III, Prince-abbot (1094–1105)
- Mangold, Prince-abbot (1105–1109)
- de:Hartmann, Prince-abbot (1109–1114)
- Totto II of Crisheim, Prince-abbot (1125–1127)
- Friedrich II Festenberger, Prince-abbot (1127–1138)
- Frederick III of Klingenstein, Prince-abbot (1138–1142)
- Robert Konrad of Scheideck, Prince-abbot (1142–1144)
- Eberhard IV, Prince-abbot (1144–1147)
- Fredeloch Vorbürger of Helmstorff, Prince-abbot (1147–1150)
- Friedrich IV of Helmishofen, Prince-abbot (1150–1155)
- Adalbert III, Prince-abbot (1155–1164)
- Hartmann II, Prince-abbot (1164–1166)
- Lantfried II, Prince-abbot (1166–1185)
- Berthold II Hochberger, Prince-abbot (1185–1197)
- Henry II, Prince-abbot (1197–?)

- County of Württemberg (complete list) –

- Conrad I, Count (pre-1081–1110)
- Konrad II, Count (1110–1143)
- Ludwig I, Count (1143–1158)
- Ludwig II, Count (1158–1181)
- Hartmann, Count (1181–1236)

== Italy ==
- Kingdom of Italy (complete list) –

- Henry V, King (1098–1125)

- Kingdom of Burgundy (later Arles) (complete list) –

- Henry IV, King (1056–1105)
- Henry V, King (1105–1125)
- Lothar III, King (1125–1137)
- Conrad III, King (1138–1152)
- Frederick I Barbarossa, King (1152–1190)
- Henry VI, King (1190–1198)

- Republic of Florence (complete list) –

- Cosimo de' Medici, Gonfaloniere of Justice, de facto ruler (1434–1464)

- March of Istria –

- Burchard, Margrave (1093–1101)
- Ulric II, Margrave (1098–1107)
- Engelbert II, Margrave (1107–1124)
- Engelbert III 1124–1173
- Berthold I, Margrave (1173–1188)
- Berthold II, Margrave (1188–1204)

- County/ Principality of Orange (complete list) –

- Raimbaut II, Count (?–c.1121)
- Tiburtia I, Countess, (c.1121–pre–1150)
- William of Aumelas, Count (pre–1150–1156)
- Raimbaut d'Aurenga, Count (1156–1173)
- Bertrand I, Prince (1173–1180)
- William I, co-Prince (1180–pre–1219)
- William II, co-Prince (1180–c.1239)

- Papal States (complete list) –

- Paschal II, Pope (1099–1118)
- Gelasius II, Pope (1118–1119)
- Callixtus II, Pope (1119–1124)
- Honorius II, Pope (1124–1130)
- Innocent II, Pope (1130–1143)
- Celestine II, Pope (1143–1144)
- Lucius II, Pope (1144–1145)
- Eugene III, Pope (1145–1153)
- Anastasius IV, Pope (1153–1154)
- Adrian IV, Pope (1154–1159)
- Alexander III, Pope (1159–1181)
- Lucius III, Pope (1181–1185)
- Urban III, Pope (1185–1187)
- Gregory VIII, Pope (1187)
- Clement III, Pope (1187–1191)
- Celestine III, Pope (1191–1198)
- Innocent III, Pope (1198–1216)

- County of Savoy (complete list) –

- Humbert II the Fat, Count (1082/91–1103)
- Amadeus III, Count (1103–1148)
- Humbert III the Blessed, Count (1148–1189)
- Thomas, Count (1189–1233)

- March of Tuscany (complete list) –

- Matilda, Margravine (1076–1115)

== Bibliography ==
- Napran, Laura (2005). Chronicle of Hainaut. Woodbridge: The Boydell Press. ISBN 9781843831204.
- Pixton, Paul B. (1995). The German Episcopacy and the Implementation of the Decrees of the Fourth Lateran Council: 1216-1245 : Watchmen on the Tower. Leiden: Brill. ISBN 9789004102620.
- Stieber, Joachim W. (1978). Pope Eugenius IV, The Council of Basel and the Secular and Ecclesiastical Authorities in the Empire: the Conflict Over Supreme Authority and Power in the Church. Leiden: Brill. ISBN 9789004052406.
