= Prince-Bishopric of Utrecht =

State of the Holy Roman Empire (1024–1528)

Prince-Bishopric of Utrecht Sticht Utrecht (Dutch) Episcopatus Ultraiectensis (Latin)
- 1024–1528
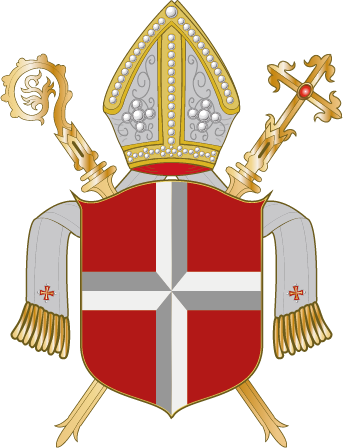
- Flag Coat of arms

- Bishopric of Utrecht c. 1350. Nedersticht is the smaller territory while Oversticht is the larger territory.
- Status: State of the Holy Roman Empire
- Capital: Utrecht
- Common languages: Middle Dutch, Medieval Latin, Middle Low German
- Religion: Roman Catholicism (State religion)
- Government: Ecclesiastical principality
- Prince-bishop
  - (1024–1026) (Note: Adalbold II of Utrecht was bishop of the Diocese of Utrecht from 1010.): Adalbold II of Utrecht
  - (1524–1528) (Note: Henry of the Palatinate remained bishop of the Diocese of Utrecht until 1529.): Henry of the Palatinate
- Historical era: Middle Ages
  - Lower Lotharingia divided from Lotharingia: 959
  - Established: 1024
  - Investiture Controversy: 1075–1122
  - Concordat of Worms: 1122
  - Joined the Burgundian Circle: 1512
  - Guelders Wars: 1502–1543
  - Disestablished: 1528
  - Union of Utrecht signed: 1579
Preceded by	Succeeded by
Lower Lotharingia	Lordship of Utrecht; Lordship of Overijssel
- Today part of: Netherlands

The Bishopric of Utrecht (Dutch: Sticht Utrecht; Latin: Episcopatus Ultraiectensis) was an ecclesiastical principality of the Holy Roman Empire in the Low Countries, in the present-day Netherlands. From 1024 to 1528, as one of the prince-bishoprics of the Holy Roman Empire, it was ruled by the bishops of Utrecht.

The Prince-Bishopric of Utrecht is not to be confused with the Diocese of Utrecht, which covered a larger area. Over the areas outside the Prince-Bishopric, the bishop exercised only spiritual, not temporal, authority.

In 1528, Charles V, Holy Roman Emperor secularized the Prince-Bishopric, depriving the bishop of its secular authority.

== History ==
History of the Low Countries (Borders are imprecise)
Frisii		Belgae					
Frisii	Cana– nefates (Note: Roman foederati)	Chamavi, Tubantes (Note: The Chamavi merged into the confederation of the Franks; the Tubantes merged into the confederation of the Saxons.)		Gallia Belgica (55 BC–c. 5th century AD); Germania Inferior (83–c. 5th century)			
Frisii	Cana– nefates	Salian Franks		Batavi			
unpopulated (4th –c. 5th centuries)		Saxons	Salian Franks (4th–c. 5th centuries)				
Frisian Kingdom (c. 6th century – 734)		Saxons	Frankish Kingdom (481–843)—Carolingian Empire (800–843)				
Frisian Kingdom (c. 6th century – 734)		Austrasia (511–687)					
Middle Francia (843–855)				West; Francia (from 843)	Middle Francia (843–855)		
Kingdom of Lotharingia (Note: Part of East Francia after 939, divided in Upper Lorraine (as part of West Francia) and Lower Lorraine (as part of East Francia) in 959.) (855–959); Duchy of Lower Lorraine (Note: Lower Lorraine—also referred to as Lothier—disintegrated into several smaller independent territories and only the title of a "Duke of Lothier" remained, held by Brabant.) (from 959)			Kingdom of Lotharingia (855–959); Duchy of Lower Lorraine (from 959)	West; Francia (from 843)	Kingdom of Lotharingia (855–959); Duchy of Lower Lorraine (from 959)		
Frisia			Kingdom of Lotharingia (855–959); Duchy of Lower Lorraine (from 959)	County of Flanders (Note: Including County of Artois (part of Flanders until 1237) and Tournaisis.) (862–1384)	Kingdom of Lotharingia (855–959); Duchy of Lower Lorraine (from 959)		
Frisian; Freedom (Note: Lordship of Frisia and Lordship of Groningen (including the Ommelanden) after 1524 and 1536 respectively.) (11th–16th centuries)	County of Holland (Note: Including County of Zeeland, that was ruled by neighboring County of Holland and County of Flanders (until 1432).) (880–1432)	Bishopric of Utrecht (Note: Utrecht included Lordship of Overijssel (until 1528), County of Drenthe (until 1528) and County of Zutphen (until 1182).) (695–1456)	Duchy of Brabant (Note: Duchy of Brabant included since 1288 also the Duchy of Limburg (now part of Belgium's Liège Province) and the "Overmaas" lands Dalhem, Valkenburg and Herzogenrath (now part of the Dutch Province of Limburg).) (1183–1430) Duchy of Guelders (Note: The county, later duchy, of Guelders consisted of four quarters, as they were separated by rivers: situated upstream Upper Quarter (the present day northern half of the Dutch province of Limburg), spatially separated from the three downstream Lower Quarters: County of Zutphen (after 1182), Veluwe Quarter and Nijmegen Quarter. The three lower quarters emerged from the historic gau Hamaland (named after the Chamavi tribe), and formed the present day province of Gelderland. Guelders did not include the Cleves enclave Huissen and the independent counties of Buren and Culemborg, that were much later seceded to the province of Gelderland.) (1046–1543)	County of Flanders (862–1384)	County of Hainaut (1071–1432) County of Namur (981–1421)	Prince- Bishopric of Liège (Note: Throughout the Middle Ages, the bishopric was further expanded with the Duchy of Bouillon in 1096 (ceded to France in 1678), the acquisition of the county of Loon in 1366 and the county of Horne in 1568. The Lordship of Mechelen was also part of the Prince-Bishopric of Liège.)(980–1791)	Duchy of Luxembourg (1059–1443)
Frisian; Freedom (11th–16th centuries)	Burgundian Netherlands (1384–1482)					Prince- Bishopric of Liège (980–1791)	Burgundian Netherlands (1384–1482)
Habsburg Netherlands (1482–1795) (Seventeen Provinces after 1543) (Note: The name Seventeen Provinces came in use after the Habsburg emperor Charles V had re-acquired the Duchy of Guelders, and an continuous territory arose.)						Prince- Bishopric of Liège (980–1791)	Habsburg Netherlands (1482–1795) (Seventeen Provinces after 1543)
Dutch Republic (1581–1795)				Spanish Netherlands (1556–1714)		Prince- Bishopric of Liège (980–1791)	Spanish Netherlands (1556–1714)
Dutch Republic (1581–1795)				Austrian Netherlands (1714–1795)		Prince- Bishopric of Liège (980–1791)	Austrian Netherlands (1714–1795)
Dutch Republic (1581–1795)				United States of Belgium (1790)		Republic of Liège (1789–'91)	United States of Belgium (1790)
Dutch Republic (1581–1795)				Austrian Netherlands (1795–1797)		P.-Bish. of Liège (1791–1794)	Austrian Netherlands (1795–1797)
Batavian Republic (1795–1806); Kingdom of Holland (1806–1810)			associated with French First Republic (1795–1804) part of First French Empire (1804–1815)				
part of First French Empire (1810–1813)			associated with French First Republic (1795–1804) part of First French Empire (1804–1815)				
Sovereign Principality of the Netherlands (1813–1815)			associated with French First Republic (1795–1804) part of First French Empire (1804–1815)				
United Kingdom of the Netherlands (1815–1830)							Grand Duchy of Luxembourg (from 1815)
Kingdom of the Netherlands (from 1839)				Kingdom of Belgium (from 1830)			Grand Duchy of Luxembourg (from 1815)
Kingdom of the Netherlands (from 1839)				Kingdom of Belgium (from 1830)			Grand Duchy of Luxembourg (from 1890)

=== Background ===
The Diocese of Utrecht was established in 695 when Saint Willibrord was consecrated bishop of the Frisians at Rome by Pope Sergius I. With the consent of the Frankish ruler, Pippin of Herstal, he settled in an old Roman fort in Utrecht. After Willibrord's death the diocese suffered greatly from the incursions of the Frisians, and later on of the Vikings. Whether Willibrord could be called the first bishop of Utrecht is doubtful; as James Palmer points out, "there was no real concept of a well-defined bishopric until at least the days of Alberic (775–84)". And while Saint Boniface is referred to in his hagiographies as the successor of Willibrord (and, in turn, Gregory of Utrecht is referred to as the successor to Willibrord and Boniface), this does not necessarily mean "successor as bishop", but rather that they succeeded each other as missionaries to the Frisians.

=== Foundation ===
Better times appeared during the reign of the Saxon emperors, who frequently summoned the Bishops of Utrecht to attend the imperial councils and diets. In 1024 the bishops were made Princes of the Holy Roman Empire and the new Prince-Bishopric of Utrecht was formed. The secular territory over which it ruled was known as Sticht Utrecht or Het Sticht (a sticht was any piece of land governed by a bishop or abbot). This territory was divided into the Nedersticht (Lower Sticht, roughly corresponding to the present day province of Utrecht) and Oversticht (Upper Sticht, encompassing the present-day provinces of Overijssel, Drenthe, and part of Groningen).

In 1122, with the Concordat of Worms, the Emperor's right of investiture was annulled, and the cathedral chapter received the right to elect the bishop. It was, however, soon obligated to share this right with the four other collegiate chapters in the city. The Counts of Holland and Guelders, between whose territories the lands of the Bishops of Utrecht lay, also sought to acquire influence over the filling of the episcopal see. This often led to disputes and consequently the Holy See frequently interfered in the election. After the middle of the 14th century the popes repeatedly appointed the bishop directly without regard to the five chapters.

It was part of the Lower Rhenish–Westphalian Circle, until 1548 when it joined the Burgundian Circle as part of the Habsburg Netherlands.

In 1527, the Bishop sold his territories, and thus his secular authority, to Holy Roman Emperor Charles V and the principality became an integral part of the Habsburg dominions. The chapters transferred their right of electing the bishop to Charles V and his government, a measure to which Pope Clement VII gave his consent, under political pressure after the Sack of Rome.

=== Dissolution ===
The Prince-Bishopric of Utrecht was conquered by Habsburg troops in 1528. The southwestern Nedersticht core territory around the city of Utrecht became the Lordship of Utrecht, whilst the southern part of the Oversticht was transformed into the Lordship of Overijssel. The northern parts were annexed in 1536 as the County of Drenthe.

== Prince-bishops ==
- Adalbold II (1010–1026)
- Bernold (1026/7–1054)
- William I (1054–1076)
- Conrad (1076–1099)
- Burchard (1100–1112)
- Godbald (1114–1127)
- Andreas van Cuijk (1127/8–1139)
- Hartbert (1139–1150)
- Herman van Horne (1151–1156)
- Godfrey van Rhenen (1156–1178)
- Baldwin II van Holland (1178–1196)
- Arnold I van Isenburg (1196–1197)
- Dirk I van Holland (1197)
- Dirk II van Are (van Ahr) (1197/8–1212)
- Otto I van Gelre (1212–1215)
- Otto II van Lippe (1216–1227)
- Wilbrand van Oldenburg (1227–1233)
- Otto III van Holland (1233–1249)
- Gozewijn van Amstel (van Randerath) (1249–1250)
- Henry I van Vianden (1250/2–1267)
- John I of Nassau (1267–1290)
- John II van Sierck (1290–1296)
- Willem II Berthout (1296–1301)
- Guy van Avennes (1301–1317)
- Frederik II van Sierck (1317–1322)
- Jacob van Oudshoorn (1322)
- Jan III van Diest (1322–1340)
- Jan IV van Arkel (1342–1364)
- Jan V van Virneburg (1364–1371)
- Arnold II of Horne (1371–1379)
- Floris van Wevelinkhoven (1379–1393)
- Frederik III van Blankenheim (1393–1423)
- Rudolf van Diepholt (1423–1455)
- Zweder van Culemborg (1425–1433)
- Walraven van Meurs (1434–1448)
- Gijsbrecht van Brederode (1455–1456)
- David of Burgundy (1456–1496)
- Frederick IV of Baden (1496–1517)
- Philip of Burgundy (1517–1524)
- Henry of the Palatinate (1524–1529)
