= Gertrude of Northeim =

12th-century German noblewoman and regent (c. 1090)

- Born: c. 1090
- Died: after 1154-before 1169
- Spouses: Siegfried of Ballenstedt; Otto of Salm
- Issue: Siegfried II of Weimar-Orlamünde; Adela of Weimar-Orlamünde; William of Weimar-Orlamünde; Otto II of Salm; Sophia of Rheineck; Beatrice of Salm
- Father: Henry, Margrave of Frisia
- Mother: Gertrude of Brunswick

Gertrude of Northeim (also Gertrude of Nordheim) (c. 1090 – after 1154/before 1169), was a German noblewoman and regent.

She was the daughter of Henry, Margrave of Frisia. Gertrude was heiress of Bentheim and Rheineck. She married first Siegfried I of Weimar-Orlamünde and then Otto I, Count of Salm. She was regent of the County of Weimar-Orlamünde during the minority of her son Siegfried II of Weimar-Orlamünde in 1113-1115, and regent of the County of Bentheim on behalf of her daughter Sophia in 1150.

== Life ==
Gertrude was born around 1090. She was the daughter of Henry, Margrave of Frisia and Gertrude of Brunswick. Gertrude had two full siblings: Otto III of Northeim, who succeeded her father, and Richenza, who married the future Emperor Lothair II. From her mother’s second marriage, to Henry I, Margrave of the Saxon Ostmark, Gertude also had a half-brother, Henry II, Margrave of Meissen.

== First marriage ==
Gertrude’s first husband was Siegfried of Ballenstedt. Though marriage to Siegfried, Gertrude was countess palatine of the Rhineland, and countess of Weimar-Orlamünde.

Gertrude had three children with Siegfried:

- Siegfried II of Weimar-Orlamünde (1107-1124)
- Adela of Weimar-Orlamünde, married Conrad I of Peilstein
- Wilhelm von Ballenstedt (1112-1140)

When she was widowed in 1113, her son Siegfried II of Weimar-Orlamünde succeeded his father as count of Weimar-Orlamünde. Her son was five years old, and Gertrude acted as his regent.

== Second marriage ==
In about 1115, Gertrude married again. Her second husband was Otto I, Count of Salm, son of the German anti-king Hermann of Salm. Part of the reason Gertrude married Otto was to secure a male protector for her underage sons, Siegfried II and William. Otto likely became the regent of Weimar-Orlamünde during the minority of her son.

With Otto, Gertrude had several children, including:

- Otto II (c. 1115 – 1148/1149), fought against Hermann von Stahleck to recapture the County Palatine of the Rhine and was taken prisoner in 1148. He was later strangled at Schönburg Castle, near Oberwesel in 1148 or 1149
- Sophia, married Dirk VI, Count of Holland (d. 6 August 1157)
- Beatrix, married Wilbrand I, Count of Loccum-Hallermund

After the deaths of her son Otto II in 1148 and her husband Otto I in 1150, Gertrude ruled the county of Bentheim herself as regent of her eldest daughter and ensured that her daughter, Sophia, retained possession of Rheineck.
