= Sophia of Rheineck =

Countess of Bentheim from 1150 to 1176

- Reign: 1150-26 September 1176
- Born: c. 1120
- Died: 26 September 1176; Jerusalem
- Buried: Jerusalem
- Noble family: House of Salm
- Spouse: Dirk VI, Count of Holland
- Issue Detail: Floris III, Count of Holland; Baldwin II van Holland; Dirk I (bishop)
- Father: Otto I, Count of Salm
- Mother: Gertrude of Northeim

Sophia of Rheineck, (also known as Sophie of Salm, Countess of Bentheim c. 1120 – 26 September 1176) was a ruling suo jure Countess of Bentheim between 1150 and 1176. She was also countess consort of Holland by marriage to Dirk VI, Count of Holland, who was her co-ruler jure uxoris in the County of Bentheim.

== Life ==
Sophia was the only daughter of Otto I, Count of Salm, the son of the German anti-king Hermann of Salm, and Gertrude of Northeim. She was married to Dirk VI, Count of Holland sometime before 1135.

Sophia would fund the construction of new churches in the abbeys of Egmond and Rijnsburg. In 1138, she made a pilgrimage to Jerusalem with her husband. During their return journey, they visited the pope in Rome.

In 1150, Sophie inherited the County of Bentheim from her brother Otto II. Her rights were defended by her mother, who acted as her regent in Bentheim. Sophie successfully claimed Bentheim, and made her spouse co-regent jure uxoris.

After her husband's death in 1157, Sophia made a pilgrimage to Santiago de Compostela, and two more pilgrimages to Jerusalem in 1173 and 1176. During the latter visit, she died in the St. Mary's hospital of the Teutonic Knights in Jerusalem. She was buried in Jerusalem.

== Issue ==
1. Dirk, known as "the Pilgrim" (Peregrinus) (c. 1138 – 1151), buried in Egmond
2. Floris III (c. 1140 – 1 August 1190 at Antioch), who succeeded his father as Count of Holland in 1157
3. Otto (c. 1140/1145 – 1208 or later), who inherited his mother's possessions and became Count of Bentheim
4. Baldwin (c. 1149 – 30 April 1196), who was Provost at St. Maria in Utrecht and later Bishop of Utrecht from 1178 until his death
5. Dirk (c. 1152 – 28 August 1197 in Pavia), who also became Bishop of Utrecht, in 1197, but died the same year
6. Sophia, who became abbess of Rijnsburg Abbey in 1186
7. Hedwig (d. 28 August 1167), who was a nun at Rijnsburg
8. Gertrud, died in infancy
9. Petronilla
