= Henry, Margrave of Frisia =

Count of Rittigau and Margrave of Frisia

Henry
- Margrave of Frisia
- Born: c. 1055
- Died: 1101 (aged 45–46)
- Buried: 4 April 1101; Bursfelde
- Noble family: House of Nordheim
- Spouse: Gertrude of Brunswick
- Issue Detail: Otto III of Nordheim; Richenza of Nordheim; Gertrude of Northeim
- Father: Otto of Nordheim
- Mother: Richenza of Swabia

Henry the Fat (c. 1055 – 1101), also known as Henry of Nordheim or Northeim, was Count in Rittigau (part of Liesgau) and Eichsfeld from 1083 onwards, and was the Margrave of Frisia from 14 April 1099 until he was murdered in 1101. He was the father of Empress Richenza.

== Life ==
Henry was the eldest son of Otto of Nordheim and Richenza of Swabia. He was, by his patrimony of Rittigau and Eichsfeld, one of the most influential Saxon princes of his age. In 1086 he married the widow Gertrude of Brunswick, which allowed him to unite her inheritance of property from the Brunonen dynasty and from the counts of Katlenburg to his Northeimer Länderei. From the counts of Bilstein Henry inherited parts of the Werra Valley, where he became the sole landholder. Further, he was the Vogt of Helmarshausen and founded a Benedictine monastery at Bursfelde in 1093.

During the civil wars of the early 1080s, which were part of the wider Investiture Controversy, Henry sided with his father, Otto, and the anti-king Herman of Salm, to whom he was related by marriage, against Henry IV of Germany. In 1086 he and his brothers, Kuno and Otto, changed sides to support Emperor Henry IV.

Henry's wife, Gertrude, was the only sister of Egbert II, Margrave of Meissen, whose own marriage remained childless. By the right of inheritance Henry stood to receive Egbert's counties in Frisia on the margrave's death in 1090, though Meissen was granted by the Emperor to another Henry. These Frisian counties, however, had been annexed from Egbert during the latter's rebellion in 1089 and were being administered by Conrad, Bishop of Utrecht. When Conrad was assassinated on 14 April 1099, the Emperor finally bestowed the counties on Henry. Henry immediately tried to regulate Frisian shipping and ignored the privileges granted to the town of Staveren. The Church, feeling threatened by Henry, allied with the merchant class and the townsmen. Though they received him on seeming friendly terms, he perceived their threat and tried to flee by boat. His ship was attacked at sea and sunk, Henry was killed, but his wife escaped the assault. The day of his death is not known precisely, but he was buried in Bursfelde on 10 April 1101.

== Issue ==
Henry and Gertrude, Henry had three children:

- Otto III of Nordheim, who inherited his father's patrimony
- Richenza, married Emperor Lothair II
- Gertrude (c. 1090 – bef. 1165), who was heiress of Bentheim and Rheineck. She married first Siegfried I of Weimar-Orlamünde and then Otto I, Count of Salm. Henry's widow, Gertrude, married the aforementioned Henry, Margrave of Meissen.
