= Sophia of Formbach =

Countess of Salm (c. 1050–1088)

- Born: c. 1050/5
- Died: after 1088
- Spouse: Hermann of Salm
- Issue: Otto I, Count of Salm; Hermann II of Salm
- Father: Meginhard IV of Formbach
- Mother: Mathilde von Reinhausen

Sophia of Formbach (also Sophia of Vormbach) (c. 1050/5 – after 1088), was the daughter of Meginhard IV of Formbach. She was countess of Salm through her marriage to Hermann of Salm, who was also elected German anti-king from 1081 to 1088.

== Life ==
Sophia was the daughter of Meginhard IV of Formbach and Matilda of Reinhausen, a daughter of Count Elli. Sophia married Hermann of Salm. The couple were closely related and there were attempts to separate them on these grounds. Hermann died in 1088. It is sometimes said that Sophia married for a second time around 1092 to Stephan II, Count of Sponheim, although this is not certain.

Sophia, like the rest of her natal dynasty (the Formbachs), was a patron of Göttweig Abbey.

== Children ==
With her first husband, Hermann, Sophia had the following children:

- Otto I, Count of Salm
- Hermann II of Salm (1087–1135)
- Dietrich of Salm (fl. 1095)

If she married Stephan II of Sponheim, then Sophia was also the mother of:

- Meginhard I, Count of Sponheim
- Jutta (1090-1136), founder of the female convent at the abbey of Disibodenberg
- Hugh of Sponheim, archbishop of Cologne (1137)
