= Hartbert (disambiguation) =

Hartbert was bishop of Utrecht from 1139 to 1150.

Hartbert may also refer to:

- Hartbert or Ardobert, bishop of Sens (8th century)
- Hartbert, bishop of Chur (949-968)
- Hartbert, bishop of Brandenburg (1100-1122)
