= Otto I of Salm =

Count of Salm, Count Palatine on the Rhine

Otto I
- Count of Salm
- Born: c. 1080
- Died: 1150 (aged 69–70)
- Noble family: House of Salm
- Spouse: Gertrude of Northeim
- Issue: Otto II of Salm; Sophia of Rheineck; Beatrice of Salm
- Father: Hermann of Salm
- Mother: Sophia of Formbach

Otto I, Count of Salm (c. 1080 – 1150) was a German nobleman. He was a ruling count of Salm and from 1125 to 1137, he was co-ruler of the County Palatine of the Rhine with his stepson William.

== Life ==
His parents were the German anti-king Hermann of Salm and his wife Sophia of Formbach. Around 1115, he married Gertrude, the widow of Count Palatine Siegfried of Ballenstedt, daughter and heir of Henry, Margrave of Frisia and Gertrude of Brunswick. Gertrude was also the sister of Richenza of Northeim, the consort of Emperor Lothair III.

Otto constructed Rheineck Castle and from c. 1124, he styled himself Otto of Rheineck, after his castle. After his stepson Count Palatine William of the Rhine had died in 1140, he claimed the County Palatine of the Rhine. However, King Conrad III of Germany, who had been elected in 1138, decided that the County Palatine was a completed fief, and hence fell back to the King, who gave it to his brother-in-law and devoted supporter Hermann von Stahleck.

Otto managed to keep Treis Castle until 1148, and Rheineck Castle until 1151. In 1148, war broke out between Otto and the Emperor. The Emperor took Treis Castle in 1148, and gave it to the Elector of Trier. In 1151, he captured and destroyed Rheineck Castle.

== Family ==
Otto married Gertrude, daughter of Henry, Margrave of Frisia. They had several children, including:

- Otto II (c. 1115 – 1148/1149), fought against Hermann von Stahleck to recapture the County Palatine of the Rhine and was taken prisoner in 1148. He was later strangled at Schönburg Castle, near Oberwesel in 1148 or 1149
- Sophia, married Dirk VI, Count of Holland (d. 6 August 1157)
- Beatrix, married Wilbrand I, Margrave of Frisia

== Notes ==
Otto I of Salm House of Salm Born: c. 1080 Died: 1150
Preceded by William	Count Palatine of the Rhine; 1140	Succeeded by Henry IV Jasomirgott
