= Henry the Fat =

Henry the Fat may refer to:

- Henry, Margrave of Frisia (died 1101)
- Henry I, Count of Anhalt (died 1252)
- Henry I of Cyprus (died 1253)
- Henry I of Navarre (died 1274)
- Henry V, Duke of Legnica (died 1296)
- Henry IV, Duke of Mecklenburg (died 1477)
