= Bernold of Constance =

German chronicler (c.1054–1100)

Bernold of Constance (c. 1054–Schaffhausen, September 16, 1100) was a priest, chronicler, writer of Christian tracts, and a defender of the Church reforms of Pope Gregory VII.

== Life ==
He was educated at Constance under the renowned teacher Bernard of Constance. He attended the Lenten Synod of Rome, in 1079, at which Berengarius of Tours retracted his errors.

He was ordained a priest on 21 December 1084 by Cardinal Odo. Remaining in Italy till 1084, he likely attended the Council of Piacenza, on the proceedings of which he is the main authority. From his writings comes the well known statement that ambassadors of the Byzantine Emperor Alexius I appeared at Piacenza to drum support for the military campaigns against the Seljuq Turks. This possibly led to the First Crusade, the matter however remains unclear.

Once more at Constance, he attended the ordination of bishop Gebhard and was ordained priest himself by the papal legate. In 1086 he went with Bishop Gebhard as counsellors to Herman, contender for the Imperial crown, at the Battle of Pleichfeld. He then entered the Benedictine Abbey of St Blasien in the Black Forest where he stayed until 1091 when he moved to the Abbey of All Saints in nearby Schaffhausen, where he died.

== Works ==
He wrote seventeen surviving tracts which are mostly apologetics for the pope's policy, defences of papal supremacy or vindications of men who advocated or enforced it in Germany. Chief among these are: De prohibendâ sacerdotum incontinentiâ (against married clergy); De damnatione schismaticorum and Apologeticus super excommunicationem Gregorii VII (justifying excommunication of schismatics and of Henry IV, Holy Roman Emperor and his partisans).

Of broader interest is Bernold's chronicle, Chronicon, the latter part of which is a terse record of contemporary events by a knowing and intelligent observer in the extreme Papal camp. The chronicle covers the years AD 1054-1100. The records of the earlier years were composed of brief summaries until the AD 1070’s, and the remaining yearly annals are much longer and expansive. The chronicle mostly focuses on Papal court politics and the rivalry with the German clergy/nobility. Important current events like warfare, famines and deaths of public figures are also briefly recounted.

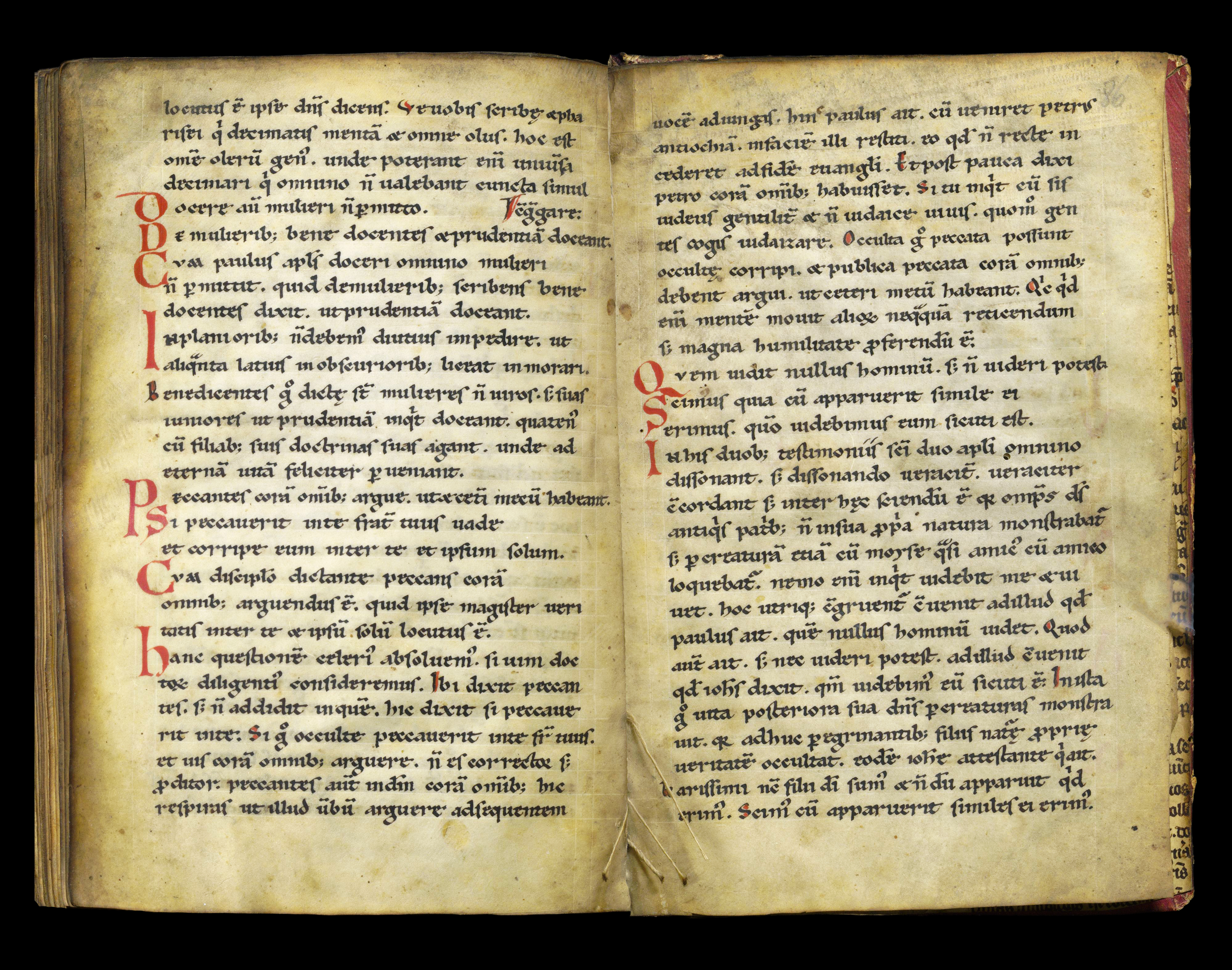
Micrologus de ecclesiasticis observationibus by Bernold of Constance excerpt from a 1100-1200 manuscript.

Bernold was the author of Micrologus de ecclesiasticis observationibus (c. 1085), a lengthy commentary on the papal liturgy that became an important medieval liturgical treatise. Thanks to him, the German church was provided with a fairly common sacramentary throughout the Empire. The form of the mass given in Micrologus was established for Hungary, too, about 1100, by order of the local bishops.

== Sources ==
- Autenrieth, Johanne (1955). Bernold von Konstanz. In: Neue Deutsche Biographie (NDB) (in German). Berlin: Duncker & Humblot. p. 127. ISBN 3-428-00183-4.
