= Egbert II of Meissen =

Germanic noble (c. 1060–1090)

Egbert II (German: Ekbert) (c. 1060 – 3 July 1090) was Count of Brunswick and Margrave of Meissen. He was the eldest son of the Margrave Egbert I of the Brunonen family.

Still a minor, he succeeded his father on the latter's death 11 January 1068 in Brunswick and Meissen. He was married to Oda, daughter of Otto I, Margrave of Weimar-Orlamünde, whose lands he inherited, including the castle of Wanderslebener Gleichen.

In 1073, the Saxons, led by Duke Magnus and Otto of Nordheim, rebelled against King Henry IV. The insurrection was crushed by Duke Vratislaus II of Bohemia in the First Battle of Langensalza on 9 June 1075. Whether Egbert had participated in the Saxon rebellion remains unclear based on extant sources, but since he had nonetheless proved himself an opponent of the king, he was deprived of Meissen, which was given to Vratislaus. However, Egbert drove Vratislaus from Meissen the next year and was condemned. A Frisian county then in his possession was confiscated and given to the Bishop of Utrecht.

Egbert originally supported anti-king Rudolf of Rheinfeld, but eventually he and many other Saxon nobles withdrew their support and remained neutral. After the death of Otto of Nordheim in 1083, Egbert was the most important, but also inconsistent, Saxon opponent of Henry IV. In 1085, the two were briefly reconciled and Egbert entertained Henry in Saxony in July. In September, the conflict was resumed, but in 1087, Egbert and Henry made peace.

Some sources report that after the death of anti-king Herman of Salm, bishops Hartwig of Magdeburg and Burchard of Halberstadt persuaded Egbert to turn against the king and himself aim for the crown. Whatever the case, Egbert soon broke with his new allies, probably because of unkept promises. Bishop Hartwig's submission to the king isolated Egbert completely.

In 1088, Egbert was besieged in his castle of Gleichen for four months by Henry, but on Christmas Eve he managed to escape, during the confusion of battle, with a relief army. He was outlawed and deprived of Meissen and his Frisian possessions by a court of princes in Quedlinburg, and later again at Ratisbon in the same year. The fleeing Egbert, undefeated but isolated, fell in combat in 1090.

His remaining possessions fell to his sister Gertrude and her husband Henry the Fat, Margrave of Frisia, whose daughter Richenza married Lothair of Supplinburg, the later Duke and Emperor.

== Sources ==
- Schlesinger, Walter (1959). Ekbert II. In: Neue Deutsche Biographie (NDB) (in German). Berlin: Duncker & Humblot. p. 428. ISBN 3-428-00185-0.

Preceded by Egbert I	Margrave of Meissen; 1068–1090	Succeeded by Henry I
