= Henry II of Meissen =

Henry II
- Margrave of Meissen; Margrave of the Ostmark
- Reign: 1103–1123
- Predecessor: Henry I
- Successor: Wiprecht of Groitzsch
- Regent: Thimo of Wettin
- Born: 1103
- Died: 1123 (aged 19–20)
- Spouse: Adelaide of Stade
- House: Wettin
- Father: Henry I, Margrave of Meissen
- Mother: Gertrud of Braunschweig

Henry II (1103–1123) was the Margrave of Meissen and the Saxon Ostmark (as Lusizensis marchio: margrave of Lusatia) from his birth until his death. He was the posthumous son of Margrave Henry I and Gertrude of Brunswick, daughter of Egbert I of Meissen. He was by inheritance also Count of Eilenburg. He was the second Meissener margrave of the House of Wettin.

He was initially under the regency of first his mother and after her death in 1117 under his great uncle Thimo. He died young and without children in 1123. His lands were inherited by his half-sister Richenza of Northeim. He left a widow, Adelaide, daughter of Lothair Udo III, Margrave of the Nordmark. The succession to the marches was disputed after his death, triggering a war between Conrad, Margrave of Meissen, who opposed the emperor's enfeoffments and believed in his hereditary rights to the marches, against Herman II, Count of Winzenburg and Wiprecht of Groitzsch who were enfeoffed by Henry V with Henry II's marches after his death.

Regnal titles
Preceded by Henry I	Margrave of the Saxon Ostmark; 1103–1123	Succeeded by Wiprecht of Groitzsch
Preceded by Henry I	Margrave of Meissen; 1103–1123	Succeeded by Wiprecht of Groitzsch
