= Wilhelm von Ballenstedt =

Wilhelm von Ballenstedt or William of Ballenstedt (born 1112 in Worms, died 13 February 1140 in Cochem) from the House of Ascania was Count of Weimar-Orlamünde from 1124 and Count Palatine of the Rhine from 1126/1129.

== Biography ==
Wilhelm was the younger son of the Count Palatine of the Rhine and Count of Weimar-Orlamünde, Siegfried of Ballenstedt, and Gertrude of Northeim. Siegfried I had inherited the estate of his stepfather and adoptive father, Count Palatine Henry of Laach, and built Cochem Castle.

In 1113 Siegfried died in battle against Emperor Henry V. The emperor did not recognize the inheritance claims of Siegfried II, William's older brother, and instead appointed his loyal companion Gottfried von Calw as Count Palatine of the Rhine. Around 1115, William's mother entered into a second marriage with Otto I, Count of Salm, who presumably acted as regent for Siegfried II. In 1124, Siegfried II died and William, still underage, succeeded him as Count of Weimar-Orlamünde, presumably also under Otto's regency.

After William's uncle, Lothar of Supplinburg was elected King of the Romans in 1125, he put pressure on Godfrey of Calw to appoint William as Count Palatine of the Rhine. William was then appointed Count Palatine, but was under Godfrey's regency while he was a minority; William's stepfather Otto also received the title of Count Palatine.

In the German throne dispute, Wilhelm was on the side of the House of Welf.

Wilhelm married a certain Adelheid, but the marriage remained without offspring.

When William died, his cousin Albert the Bear succeeded him in the County of Weimar-Orlamünde. In the County Palatine of the Rhine, his stepfather Otto was overthrown by the Hohenstaufen King Conrad III, who first enfeoffed his own half-brother Henry II Jasomirgott of Austria and, in the following year, his brother-in -law Hermann von Stahleck with the County Palatine.
