= Flag of Utrecht =

Flag of Utrecht may refer to:

- Flag of Utrecht (city)
- (Utrecht (province)) Flag of Utrecht (province)
