= Andreas van Cuijk =

Dutch bishop

- Bishop of Utrecht
- Church: Catholic Church
- Diocese: Archdiocese of Utrecht
- In office: 1128–1139

Personal details
- Born: c. 1070
- Died: 23 June 1139

Andries or Andreas van Cuijk (ca. 1070 – 23 June 1139) was a bishop of Utrecht from 1128 to 1139.

Andries descended from a well-known family from the Sticht, the name for the central lands of the Bishopric of Utrecht. Andries was the second son of Herman of Malsen and Irmgard of Namur.

He was the first bishop of Utrecht since the Concordat of Worms in 1122, where the Investiture Controversy between the emperor and the pope over the right to appoint bishops was decided in favour of the pope. Andries was naturally allied to the papal party.

In 1133, Andries became involved in a war with Dirk VI, Count of Holland, who was supported by the city of Utrecht and several servants of the bishop. Dirk was granted the Gaue of Westergo and Oostergo by Conrad III of Germany. These lands had previously been confiscated by Henry V, Holy Roman Emperor from Andries' predecessor, bishop Burchard.

Preceded by Godbald	Bishop of Utrecht; 1128–1139	Succeeded by Hartbert
