= Vaartse Rijn =

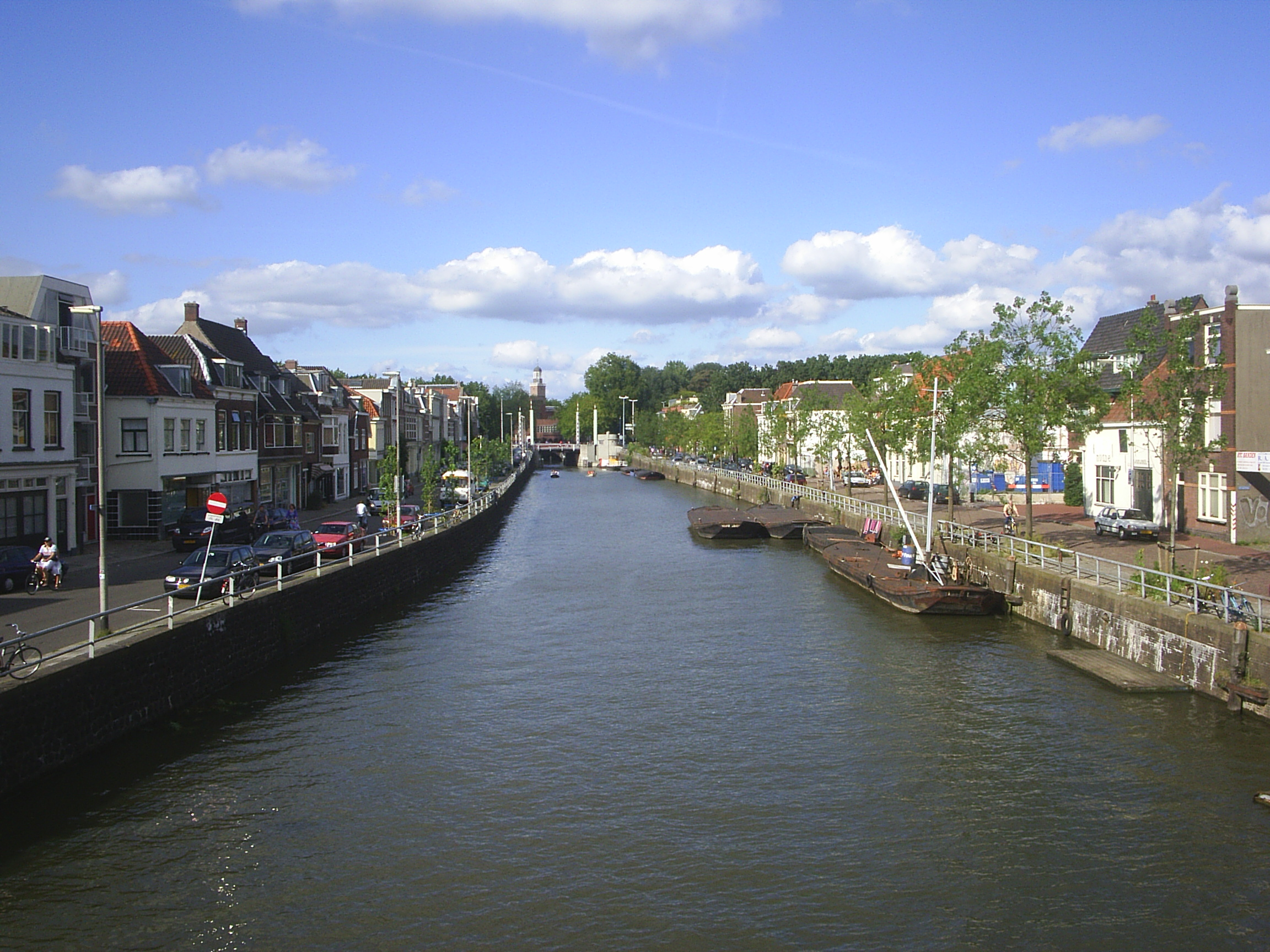
- The Vaartse Rijn in Utrecht, looking in the direction of the city centre

History
- Date of first use: 1127

Geography
- Start point: Utrecht; 52.0811°N 5.1238°E
- End point: Lek, near Vreeswijk; 52.0029°N 5.0918°E

The Vaartse Rijn is a canal connecting the city of Utrecht with Nieuwegein and the Lek river in the Dutch province of Utrecht. The Vaartse Rijn was formerly a major shipping route between Utrecht and the Rhine basin.

== History ==
In 1122, Bishop Godebald of Utrecht dammed the Kromme Rijn where it branches from the Nederrijn at Wijk bij Duurstede. In the Roman period, The Kromme Rijn had been the main channel of the Rhine river, but by this stage was a minor distributary, most water flowing in the Lek and the Waal distributaries. The Kromme Rijn was dammed to prevent inundation of the Bishop's land holdings near Wijk bij Duurstede. The dam on the Kromme Rijn severed the shipping connection between Utrecht and the Rhine hinterland, and the citizens of Utrecht therefore decided to dig a canal restoring the connection.

The first phase of construction of the Vaartse Rijn, (also called the Rechte Rijn in contrast to the Kromme Rijn) began in 1127, making it one of the oldest canals in the Netherlands. The first stretch was dug between the moat surrounding Utrecht and Liesbosch (currently part of the town of Nieuwegein. In the middle of the 12th century, the Vaartse Rijn was extended in the direction of the Hollandse IJssel, (the so-called Doorslag canal). At its junction with the Hollandse IJssel, a lock protected the canal from inundation. At the time, the Hollandse IJssel was in open connection with the Lek river, a major distributary of the Rhine.

In 1285 Floris V, Count of Holland dammed the Hollandse IJssel connection between the Lek and the Hollandse IJssel. In order to maintain the connection between the Utrecht and the Lek, Floris ordered the construction of a new stretch of the Vaartse Rijn (the "Nieuwe Vaart"), to meet the Lek directly at Vreeswijk. In 1373 the Vaartse Rijn was deepened, and a lock installed at Vreeswijk.
