= Gertrude of Brunswick =

German countess (c.1060–1117)

- Margravine of Meissen
- Born: c. 1060; Brunswick
- Died: 9 December 1117 (aged 56–57)
- Buried: Brunswick Cathedral
- Noble family: Brunonids
- Spouses: Dietrich II, Count of Katlenburg; Henry, Margrave of Frisia; Henry I, Margrave of the Saxon Ostmark
- Issue: Dietrich III of Katlenburg; Richenza of Northeim; Otto III of Northeim; Henry II, Margrave of Meissen; Gertrude of Northeim
- Father: Egbert I, Margrave of Meissen
- Mother: Immilla of Turin

Gertrud of Brunswick (German: Gertrud von Braunschweig; c. 1060 – 9 December 1117) was Countess of Katlenburg by marriage to Dietrich II, Count of Katlenburg, Margravine of Frisia by marriage to Henry, Margrave of Frisia, and Margravine of Meissen by marriage to margrave Henry I.

She served as regent of the County of Katlenburg during the minority of her son Dietrich III of Katlenburg in 1085-?, as regent of the Margrave of Frisia during the minority of her son Count Otto III of Northeim in 1090-?, and as regent of the County of Northeim during the minority of her son Henry II, Margrave of Meissen in 1103-?. She was also one of the leaders of the insurrections against Emperor Henry IV and his son Henry V.

== Life ==
Gertrud was the only daughter of Margrave Egbert I of Meissen (d. 1068) and Immilla of Turin (d. 1078), and as such a member of the Brunonid dynasty. Through her father, Gertrude was a great-granddaughter of Brun I, Count of Brunswick and Gisela of Swabia; since Gisela later became German queen and empress consort (from 1024 to 1043), Gertrude was closely related to Emperor Henry III and Emperor Henry IV. Through her mother, Gertrude was the niece of Adelaide of Turin and first cousins with Bertha of Savoy, German queen and empress consort from 1066 to 1087.

=== Katlenburg ===
She was married to Count Dietrich II of Katlenburg (d. 1085). In 1090, after the childless death of her older brother Margrave Egbert II of Meissen, last of the male Brunonids, she inherited the ancestral seat of Brunswick in Saxony. When her husband died, she acted as regent for their son Dietrich III.

=== Frisia ===
About 1086, Gertrude married again, this time to the Northeim count Henry the Fat (d. 1101), who was appointed Margrave of Frisia on 14 April 1099. Their daughter Richenza of Northeim (d. 1142) married Lothar of Süpplingenburg, Duke of Saxony and future Holy Roman Emperor. He received the Brunonen's seat at Brunswick. After Henry's death in 1101, Gertrud again acted as regent, this time for her second son Count Otto III of Northeim.

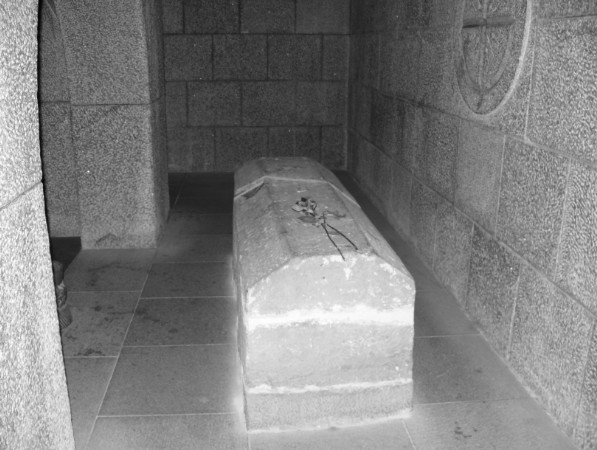
Tomb at Brunswick Cathedral

=== Meissen ===
Gertrud's third husband was the Wettin scion Henry I of Eilenburg (d. 1103), Margrave of Margraviate of Meissen since 1089. Their son, Henry II was probably born after his death in 1103; Gertude acted as regent during his minority. She was one of the leaders of the insurrections against Emperor Henry IV and his son Henry V. She protected the interests of her sons and Margrave Henry II later secured the Wettin authority over Meissen.
