= Gottfried von Calw =

- Died: 6 February 1131
- Other names: Godfrey of Calw
- Known for: Count of Calw and Count Palatine of the Rhine
- Spouse: Liutgard von Zähringen
- Children: 3
- Father: Count Adalbert II of Calw and Wiltrudis of Lorraine

Gottfried von Calw or Godfrey of Calw (died 6 February 1131) was Count of Calw and Count Palatine of the Rhine from 1113 to 1126.

He was the younger son of Count Adalbert II of Calw and Wiltrudis of Lorraine, a daughter of Duke Godfrey the Bearded. In 1095 he became Vogt of Hirsau and succeeded his father in Calw when the latter retired to the monastery in 1094/95. Godfrey was initially a follower of Emperor Henry IV, but from 1105, the year of the dispute over the throne between Henry IV and his son Henry V, he was one of the latter's most important supporters and advisors. Godfrey of Calw took part in the negotiations at San Maria in Turri and Ponte Mammolo during Henry V's first campaign in Italy in 1111, and later in the negotiations in Mouzon in 1119 and in those leading to the Concordat of Worms in 1122, which he co-signed.

After the death of Count Palatine Siegfried of Ballenstedt on March 9, 1113 as a result of an attack by imperial supporters, Gottfried was appointed as his successor on April 6, 1113.

His appointment led to disputes in Lorraine the following year, as well as with the Archbishop of Mainz, Adalbert I of Saarbrücken, and his colleague in Trier, Bruno von Lauffen. Before his second campaign in Italy in 1116, Henry V made Godfrey one of his representatives in Germany, together with Frederick II, Duke of Swabia and his brother Conrad which Godfrey used against Adalbert. The death of Henry V in 1125 and the election of Lothair III as the new king weakened Godfrey's position: although he was not immediately stripped of the County Palatine, a second Count Palatine, Wilhelm von Ballenstedt was appointed alongside him. Gottfried acted as guardian for Wilhelm, a minor, from 1126 to 1129 and was then forced to hand the County Palatine over to him.

Gottfried was married to Liutgard von Zähringen, a daughter of Duke Berthold II (not to be confused with the other Liutgard von Zähringen, daughter of Berthold I). With her he had at least three children:

- Gottfried, (died before 1131/32)
- Liutgard
- Uta of Schauenburg, (died 1196), who married Welf VI
