= Flag of Utrecht (city) =

Municipal flag

Municipality of Utrecht
- Flag of the Municipality of Utrecht
- Use: Municipal flag
- Proportion: 2:3
- Adopted: 5 July 1990; 36 years ago (officially, current)
- Design: Diagonally divided, with the upper right section being white and the lower left being red

The flag of Utrecht was adopted on the 5th of July, 1990 by the city council of Utrecht. The municipality's flag consists of two diagonally divided red and white pennons. The flag was ultimately derived from the corresponding municipal coat of arms.

== History ==
The flag of Utrecht originates from the medieval period, during which the city's militia was divided into two factions each symbolised by a single white and a single red monochromatic, triangular pennant. The municipality's contemporary flag represents the merger of these two pennants and adheres to a proportion of 2:3.

Historically, flags prominently featured Saint Martin, the municipality's patron saint, depicted on horseback cutting his red cloak to give to an individual in need.

The previous flag, which is used from 1948 till 1990, the municipal council adopted the following flag: Diagonally right of red and white, with Saint Martin in white.

== Gallery ==
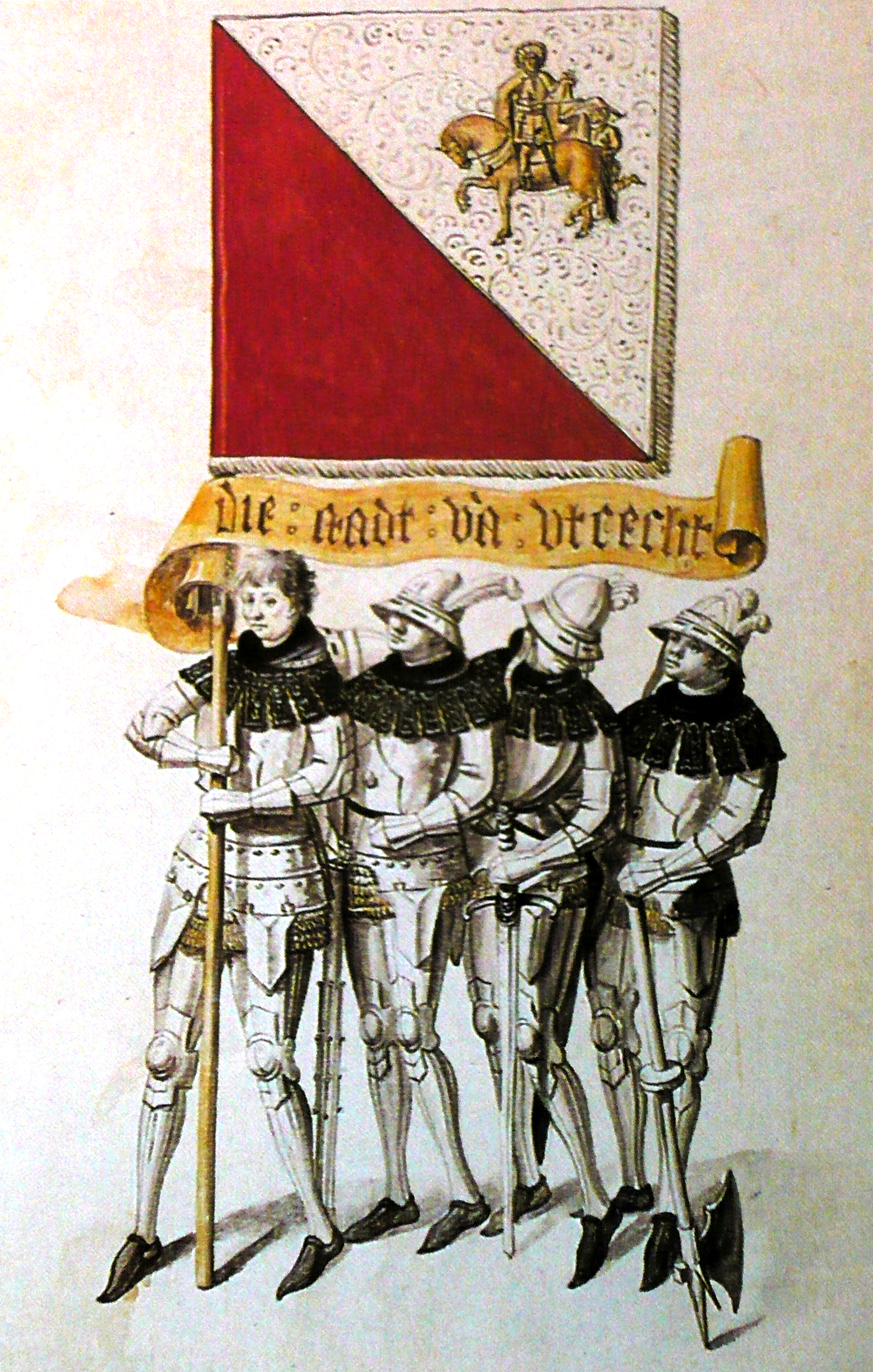
Some archers with the banner of the city (1648)

Design presented to the city in 1956

Variant of the flag c. 1961

Former municipal flag (1948-1990)
