= Dirk I (bishop) =

- Bishop of Utrecht
- Church: Catholic Church
- Diocese: Archdiocese of Utrecht
- In office: 1197

Personal details
- Died: 28 August 1197

Dirk van Holland (died at Pavia, 28 August 1197) was briefly bishop of Utrecht in 1197.

Dirk van Holland was the son of Count Dirk VI of Holland and Sophia van Rheineck. This made him brother to Count Floris III of Holland and Bishop Baldwin of Utrecht.

After Baldwin's death, Dirk was put forward by their nephew Count Dirk VII of Holland as candidate for the vacant seat at Utrecht. He was supported by Emperor Henry VI. However, the count of Guelders nominated Arnold I van Isenburg for the seat, and Arnold was supported by the archbishop of Cologne and the pope. The impasse resulted in Dirk being recognised in the Nedersticht while Arnold was recognised in the Oversticht.

Both candidates travelled to Rome, where Arnold was consecrated as bishop by Pope Celestine III in 1196. Arnold died in the same year however, which allowed Dirk to be consecrated after all. Dirk died while on his way back to Utrecht, in Pavia.

Preceded by Arnold I van Isenburg	Bishop of Utrecht; 1197	Succeeded by Dirk van Are
