= Battle of Pleichfeld =

Middle Ages battle in 1086 (in modern Germany)

- Part of the Saxon revolt of 1077–1088
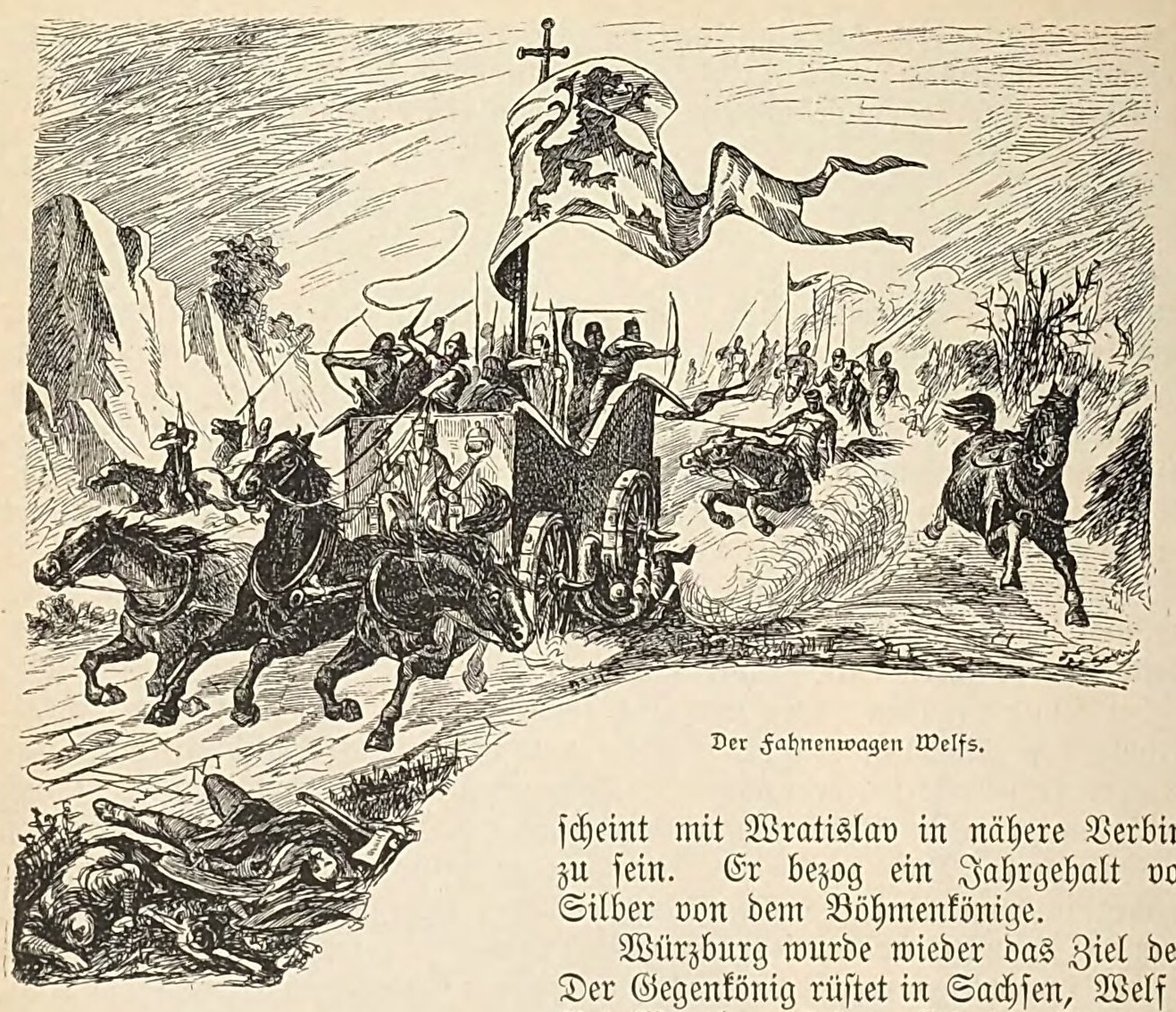
- The flag wagon of Welf in the battle (illustration by Emil Nietzsch Jr., 1890)
Date	11 August 1086
Location	Pleichfeld (near Würzburg), Germany
Result	Rebel victory
Territorial changes	Fall of Würzburg to the rebels

Belligerents
Holy Roman Empire	County of Luxemburg; Bavaria

Commanders and leaders
Henry IV, Holy Roman Emperor	Herman of Luxembourg; Welf I, Duke of Bavaria

Strength
20,000	10,000

Battle of Pleichfeld, in 1086, was the last major battle of the Saxon revolt of 1077–1088, a nobles' rebellion against the emperor Henry IV in the Holy Roman Empire. The battle was a victory for the rebel forces.

== Prelude ==
In their rebellion against the central imperial authority, Herman of Luxembourg and Duke Welf I of Bavaria laid siege to the imperial city of Würzburg in summer of 1086. In an effort to destroy the center of rebellion and to maintain the unity of the empire, emperor Henry IV attempted to lift the siege.

== Battle ==
Imperial army, numbering about 20,000 (according to unverifiable contemporary accounts), was largely composed of armed peasants and town militia, while rebel forces, numbering some 10,000, had a larger proportion of mounted knights.

Armies met on 11 August 1086 at Pleichfeld, a village 3 km (2 mi) north of Würzburg. Rebel knights dismounted, and charged the enemy on foot. Loyalist army, composed mostly of untrained peasants and armed citizens, broke and fled after the first charge. Their swift defeat was attributed by chroniclers to treason amongst the emperor's own knights, who accepted a bribe and changed sides in the thick of battle.
