= Ludwig I of Württemberg =

German nobleman

Ludwig I of Württemberg (c. 1098 – 1158) was Count of Wirtemberg. He reigned from 1143 until 1158 as the third ruler of Württemberg and first in his family line to do so. He acted as a member of the courts for Emperor Conrad III and Emperor Frederick I Barbarossa.

Ludwig I is supposed to have been the son of Konrad II and his wife Hadelwig. Together with his brother Emicho he appears from 1134 till 1154 respective 1139 till 1154 at the court of king Konrad III and emperor Friedrich I, Barbarossa. He presumably was Vogt of the Denkendorf monastery.

Preceded by Konrad II	Count of Württemberg; 1143–1158	Succeeded by Ludwig II
