= Konrad II of Württemberg =

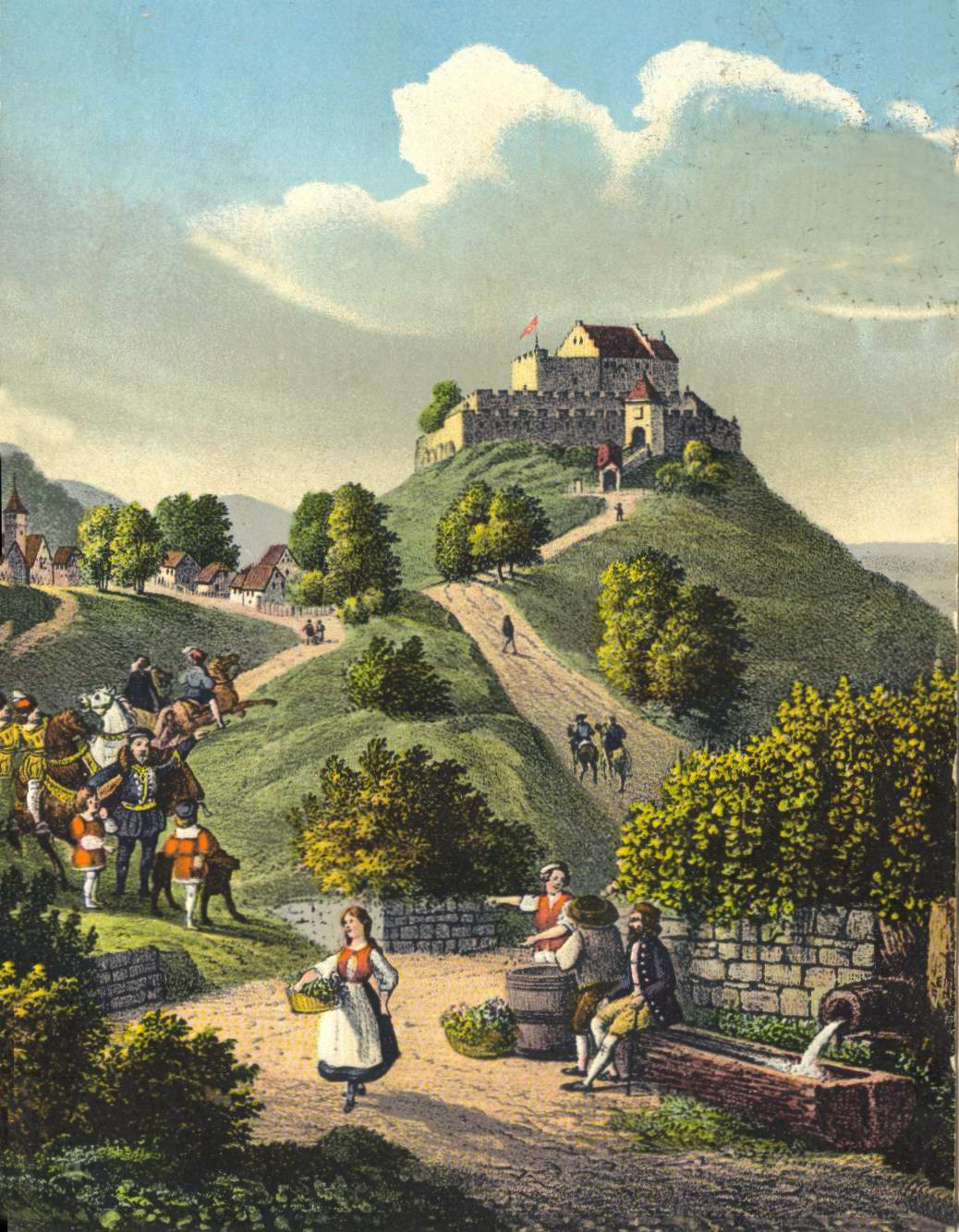
Castle Wirtemberg (around 1600) on a postcard of 1920

Konrad II (died 1143) was Count of Württemberg. He reigned from 1110 until 1143. He served as marshal of Swabia and advocate of the town of Ulm, and had large possessions in the valleys of the Neckar and the Rems.

Konrad's father is unknown, but he is believed to belong to the family of the counts of Veringen (Veringenstadt). The reason to believe so is due to the similarity of the arms of the Counts of Veringen with that of the Counts of Wirtemberg. Thus it is generally assumed that both noble families are related to each other. Konrad's mother Luitgard of Beutelsbach was a sister of his predecessor Konrad I.

After the death of Konrad I, he assumed power as heir of castle Wirtemberg. Konrad II appears on 12 May 1110 together with his wife Hadelwig as donator of properties near Göppingen to the monastery Blaubeuren and on 28 December 1122 as a witness of emperor Heinrich V in Speyer (the first time as count, the latter without title but mentioned amongst counts). He died in 1143.

| Preceded by Konrad I | Count of Württemberg; 1110–1143 | Succeeded by Ludwig I |
