= Godbald =

Bishop of Utrecht (d. 1127)

- Bishop of Utrecht
- Church: Catholic Church
- Diocese: Archdiocese of Utrecht
- In office: 1114–1127

Personal details
- Died: 12 November 1127

Godbald (or Godebald) (died 12 November 1127, in Utrecht) was a bishop of Utrecht from 1114 to 1127.

Nothing is known about Godbald's origins. He was Provost at the chapter of St John's church in Utrecht and was closely involved in the management of the bishops Conrad of Swabia and Burchard before he was himself elected as bishop in 1114, after a lengthy vacancy.

On his elevation, his first act was to restore order in the Zeelandic part of the diocese, which belonged to the County of Flanders. The heretical preacher Tanchelm had tried to get the area transferred to the bishopric of Terwaan, which was governed by a like-minded bishop. Tanchelm died in 1115, but his influence remained. In 1123, Godbald founded Middelburg Abbey, a Norbertine monastery in Middelburg, which was assigned to combat the heresy of Tanchelm.

Godbald was a reform-minded man. This was shown by his involvement in the founding of St. Laurence's Abbey near Oostbroek at De Bilt, which was the first monastery in the diocese to join the Cluniac movement. Godbald sided with the pope in the Investiture Controversy. During a visit of Henry V, Holy Roman Emperor, to Utrecht in 1122, the following of the emperor clashed with the bishop's ministeriales, after which Godbald was taken prisoner. He was soon released, but at the cost of major concessions. The city of Utrecht was given several important city rights; they were allowed to build an earthen wall around the city and they received financial favours at the cost of the bishopric.

At the Concordat of Worms in the same year, Godbald seems to have supported the emperor, but in 1123 they clashed again. They soon reconciled, but Henry V died in 1125 in Utrecht, after which his opponent Lothair III rose to the throne. Almost immediately Godbald was at odds with the emperor again. Lothair III supported his family-in-law, the Counts of Holland, and granted them rights over Friesland, which had previously been granted to the bishopric by Emperor Henry IV.

During the Imperial Diet at Utrecht in 1126, Godbald again lost in a dispute with the counts of Holland, this time over the newly mined peatlands around Utrecht. Godbald had played an active role in the cultivation of these areas. He had also had a dam laid down at Wijk bij Duurstede to stabilize the water level of the Kromme Rijn, and he had the Vaartse Rijn, a short canal, dug to improve the ship transportation.

After the setback at the Imperial Diet, Godbald retreated to the monastery of Oostbroek, where he died and was buried in 1127.

Preceded by Burchard (bishop of Utrecht)	Bishop of Utrecht; 1114–1127	Succeeded by Andreas van Cuijk
