= Henry I of the Saxon Ostmark =

Noble of the House of Wettin (1070–1103)

Henry I the Old
- Margrave of the Eastern March
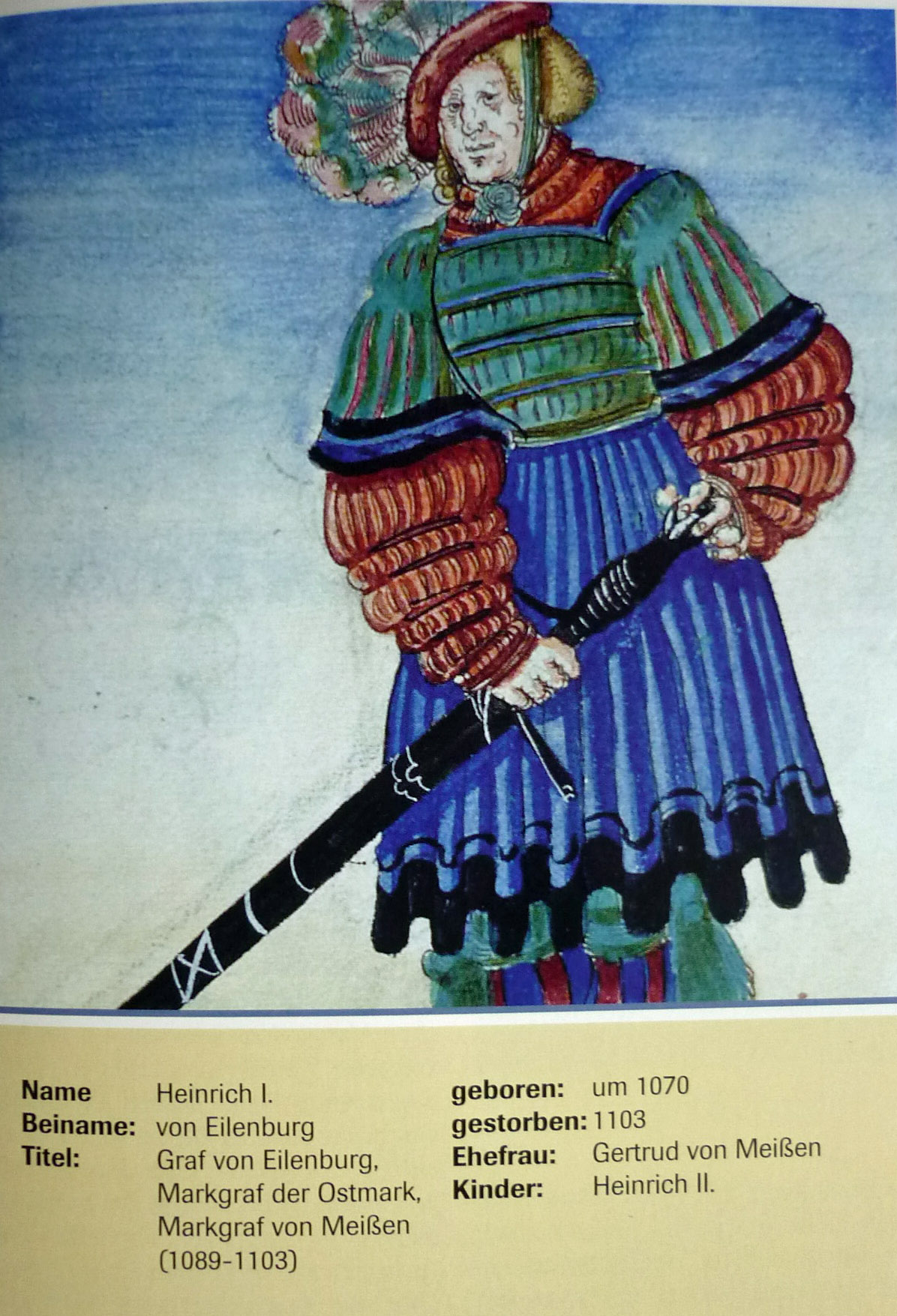
- Depiction in the chronicles by George Spalatin (c. 1520)
- Reign: 1075–1103
- Predecessor: Dedi I, Margrave of the Saxon Ostmark
- Successor: Henry II, Margrave of Meissen
- Born: 1070
- Died: 1103 (aged 43)
- Buried: Meissen
- Noble family: House of Wettin
- Spouse: Gertrud of Braunschweig
- Issue: Henry II
- Father: Dedi I of Wettin
- Mother: Adela of Louvain

Henry I (1070–1103), nicknamed the Old, a member of the House of Wettin, was Count of Eilenburg as well as Margrave of the Saxon Eastern March (March of Lusatia) from 1081 and Margrave of Meissen from 1089 until his death.

== Life ==
Henry was the son of the Wettin margrave Dedi I of Lusatia and his second wife Adela of Louvain, a granddaughter of Count Lambert I of Louvian and widow of Margrave Otto I of Meissen. His father ruled the Lusatian march since 1046; he was one of the nobles who joined the Saxon revolt of 1073–1075, but he quickly approached the Salian king Henry IV and was able to retain his margraviate until his death in 1075. Nevertheless, he had to extradite his minor son and heir Henry to the king as a hostage.

Henry was remained in captivity until in 1081 the king enfeoffed him with the March of Lusatia to curb Bohemian influence. It had previously been enfeoffed to Duke Vratislaus II of Bohemia in turn for his support against the Saxon insurgents, but he had never been confirmed in his possession.

Later, in 1089, he was also granted the Margraviate of Meissen by Emperor Henry IV. He was the first of the House of Wettin to govern that march, following the deposition of the Brunonid margrave Egbert II, who had sided with anti-king Hermann of Salm. About 1102 Margrave Henry married Egbert's daughter Gertrude of Brunswick (d. 1117) to further legitimate his claims. From this marriage he had one posthumous son, his successor Henry II. As Gertrude of Brunswick is sometimes nicknamed the Younger and there is no candidate for "Gertrude the Elder", the nickname must have come from confusion with an otherwise unattested daughter named Gertrude.

Margrave Henry was killed fighting against the Polabian Slavs near the Neisse river.

== Notes ==
Henry I the Elder House of Wettin Born: c. 1070 Died: 1103
Preceded by Dedi I	Margrave of the Eastern March; 1075–1103	Succeeded by Henry II
Preceded by Egbert II	Margrave of Meissen; 1089–1103	Succeeded by Henry II
