= Godfrey van Rhenen =

- Bishop of Utrecht
- Church: Catholic Church
- Diocese: Archdiocese of Utrecht
- In office: 1156–1178

Personal details
- Died: 27 May 1178

Godfried or Godfrey van Rhenen (died on 27 May 1178) was a bishop of Utrecht from 1156 to 1178.

Godfrey was appointed with support from Frederick I, Holy Roman Emperor in 1159 to deal with a revolt of citizens and his own ministers as a consequence of the struggle between the papal-supporting Welfs and the emperor-supporting Hohenstaufen, in which Godfrey supported the Hohenstaufen. The revolt was ended in 1160 in favour of the bishop. After this he busied himself with strengthening his position in the Oversticht and in Friesland. This led to a conflict with Floris III, Count of Holland in 1165, in which the emperor mediated. Bishop Godfrey built forts at Vollenhove and Montfoort.

Preceded by Herman van Horne	Bishop of Utrecht; 1156-1178	Succeeded by Baldwin II van Holland
