= Herman van Horne =

Dutch bishop (died 1156)

- Bishop of Utrecht
- Church: Catholic Church
- Diocese: Archdiocese of Utrecht
- In office: 1150–1156

Personal details
- Died: 31 January 1156

Herman van Horne (or Hoorn) (died 31 January 1156) was Bishop of Utrecht from 1150 to 1156. Herman was son of Thiery de Looz, Count of Horn, and grandson of Emmo, Count of Looz.

Herman became archdeacon at Liège in 1136, and provost of Sankt-Gereon in Cologne in 1149. He was consecrated as bishop of Utrecht in July 1150. His election was supported by the counts of Gelre, Holland and Cleves, but it was opposed by the city of Utrecht, who had chosen Frederick II of Berg. The resistance of the city was eventually broken by king Frederick I Barbarossa.

Preceded by Hartbert	Bishop of Utrecht; 1150–1156	Succeeded by Godfrey van Rhenen
