= Richenza of Northeim =

Holy Roman Empress from 1133 to 1137

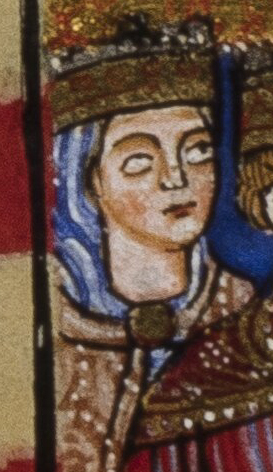
- Depiction in the Gospels of Henry the Lion, Richenza's grandson

Holy Roman Empress
- Tenure: 4 June 1133 – 4 December 1137
- Coronation: 4 June 1133, Rome

Queen consort of Germany
- Tenure: 30 August 1125 – 4 December 1137

Queen consort of Italy
- Tenure: 30 August 1125 – 4 December 1137
- Born: c. 1087/1089
- Died: 10 June 1141
- Spouse: Lothair II, Holy Roman Emperor (m. 1107; died 1137)
- Issue: Gertrude, Duchess of Bavaria
- Father: Henry, Margrave of Frisia
- Mother: Gertrude of Brunswick

Richenza of Northeim (c. 1087/1089 – 10 June 1141) held many titles from her marriage to her husband Lothair of Supplinburg in c. 1107. She was Duchess of Saxony since marriage, as well as Queen of Germany from 1125, Queen of Italy from 1128, and Holy Roman Empress from 1133.

== Family ==
Richenza was the daughter of Count Henry the Fat of Northeim (d. 1101) and Gertrude of Brunswick, daughter of the Brunonid margrave Egbert I of Meissen. Around 1107 Richenza married Lothair of Supplinburg, recently enfeoffed with the Duchy of Saxony. Richenza's only surviving daughter with Lothair, Gertrude of Süpplingenburg, was born in 1115.

== Queen and empress ==
After Lothair was elected King of the Romans in 1125, Richenza was crowned queen by Archbishop Frederick I of Cologne. Richenza took an active part in her husband's reign, which is reflected in her activities during the papal schism of 1130, and her role as intermediary between Lothair and his Hohenstaufen rivals, the proclaimed anti-king Conrad III and his brother Duke Frederick II of Swabia. In 1132–33 she accompanied her husband to the Kingdom of Italy. There they were crowned emperor and empress by Pope Innocent II at the Lateran Basilica in Rome on 4 June 1133. She also took part in Lothair's second Italian expedition in 1136–37, whereby she presided over hearings of the Imperial court and issued several deeds.

== Widowhood ==
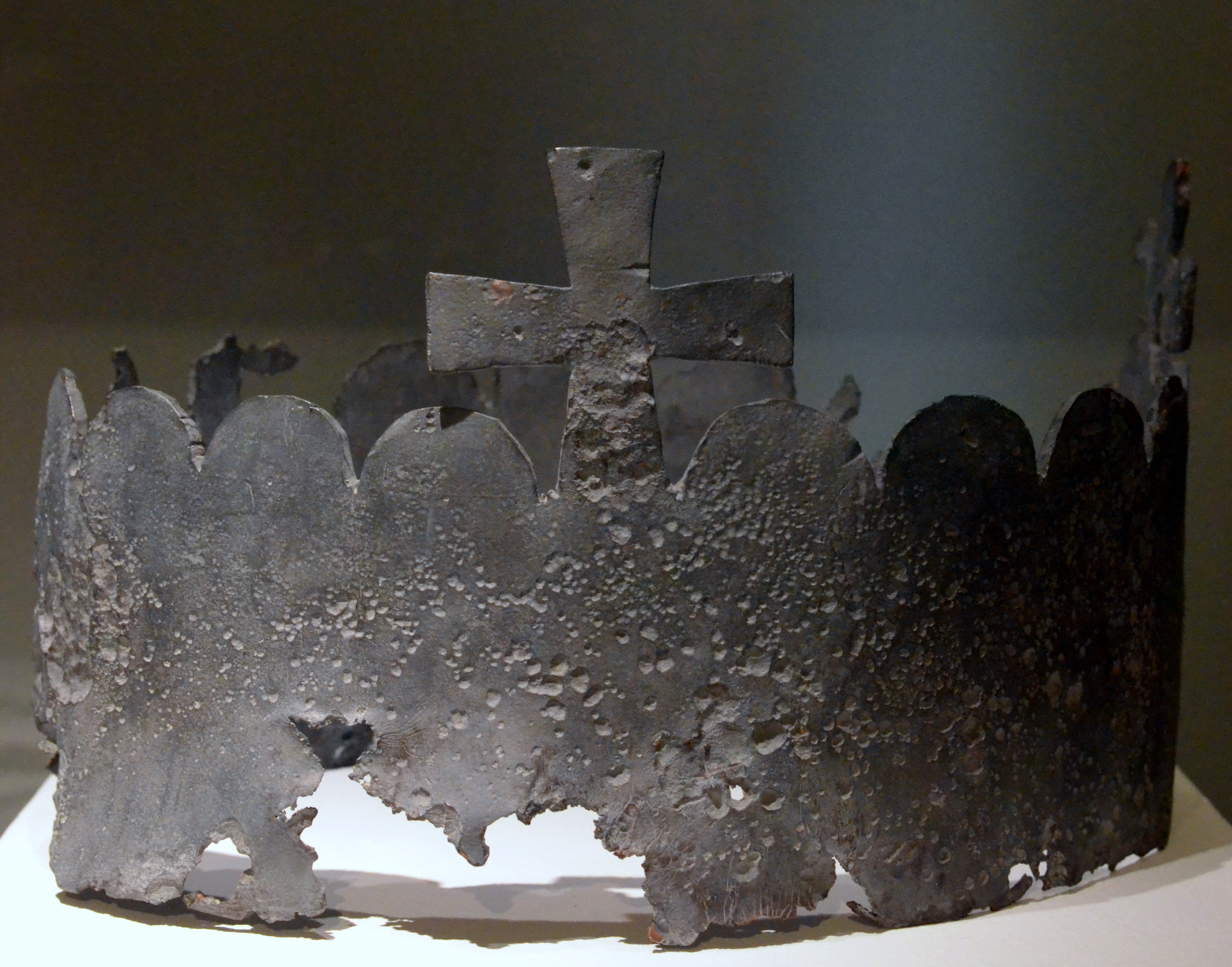
Crown from Richenza's grave, Braunschweigisches Landesmuseum

Lothair died in 1137, and Richenza moved swiftly to ensure the lands of Saxony went to her son-in-law, Duke Henry the Proud. On Pentecost the following year, however, the Princes of the Holy Roman Empire convened in Bamberg to elect Conrad III King of the Romans. Conrad vested the Ascanian count Albert of Brandenburg with Saxony and Henry died soon after, in the autumn of 1139. Richenza fought hard for the inheritance of her grandson Henry the Lion, seeing to his education, and pushing for his right to be regarded as the heir to the Saxon duchy. Young Henry was finally appointed Duke in 1142; his mother Gertrude ruled as regent until his majority.

Richenza however did not live to see her grandson succeed to the duchy. She died in 1141 and was buried next to her husband Emperor Lothair and her son-in-law Duke Henry the Proud in the Imperial Cathedral at Königslutter. Her grave goods included a simple and elegant lead crown.

== Sources ==
- Davis, R.H.C. (2013). Moore, R.I. (ed.). A History of Medieval Europe: From Constantine to Saint Louis (3rd ed.). Routledge. ISBN 978-0-582-78462-8.
- (in German) genealogie-mittelalter.de

Richenza of Northeim House of Northeim Born: c. 1087 Died: 10 June 1141
Royal titles
Preceded by Matilda of England	Empress consort of the Holy Roman Empire; 1133 – 4 November 1137	Succeeded by Beatrice I of Burgundy
Preceded by Matilda of England	Queen consort of Germany; 1125 – 4 November 1137	Succeeded by Beatrice I of Burgundy
Preceded by Matilda of England	Queen consort of Italy; 1128 – 4 November 1137	Succeeded by Gertrud of Comburg
