= Arnold I van Isenburg =

- Bishop of Utrecht
- Church: Catholic Church
- Diocese: Archdiocese of Utrecht
- In office: 1196–1197

Personal details
- Died: April or June 1197

Arnold (or Arnoud) van Isenburg (died in April or June 1197) was Bishop of Utrecht from 1196 to 1197.

Arnold descended from the German House of Isenburg and had been provost in Deventer since 1176. After Bishop Baldwin II van Holland died, Arnold was pushed forward by the count of Guelders. He was also supported by the archbishop of Cologne and the pope. However, Dirk VII, Count of Holland wanted his uncle, Dirk of Holland as bishop of Utrecht, and he was supported by Henry VI, Holy Roman Emperor. The resulting impasse led to Arnold being recognised by the Oversticht, while Dirk was recognised in the Nedersticht.

Both candidates travelled to Rome, where Arnold was consecrated by Pope Celestine III as bishop of Utrecht. However, he died soon after, allowing Dirk to be consecrated after all.

Preceded by Baldwin II van Holland	Bishop of Utrecht; 1196–1197	Succeeded by Dirk I (bishop)
