= Baldwin II van Holland =

Dutch bishop (died 1196)

- Bishop of Utrecht
- Church: Catholic Church
- Diocese: Archdiocese of Utrecht
- In office: 1178–1196

Personal details
- Died: 30 April 1196

Baldwin van Holland (died 30 April 1196 in Mainz) was bishop of Utrecht from 1178 to 1196.

Baldwin was the son of Dirk VI, Count of Holland and Sophia of Rheineck, and brother to counts Otto van Bentheim and Floris III, Count of Holland. Before Baldwin became bishop of Utrecht, he had been chaplain of Henry the Lion. With a relative as Bishop, the count of Holland was about to expand his power in Utrecht. During his rule Baldwin was involved in struggles with Otto I, Count of Guelders over the Veluwe and Salland, and with the lords of Groningen and Coevorden. These wars resulted in numerous raids and plunders in the Oversticht, which weighed heavily on the bishopric's finances. After his death Baldwin was interred in St. Martin's Cathedral, Utrecht.

Preceded by Godfrey van Rhenen	Bishop of Utrecht; 1178–1196	Succeeded by Arnold I van Isenburg
