= Hartbert =

Bishop of Utrecht

- Bishop of Utrecht
- Church: Catholic Church
- Diocese: Archdiocese of Utrecht
- In office: 1139–1150

Personal details
- Died: 12 November 1150

Hartbert van Bierum (died 12 November 1150) was a bishop of Utrecht from 1139 to 1150.

Hartbert, or Heribert, in several translations, was consecrated as bishop on 24 July 1139. During his rule, a rebellion occurred in the city of Groningen. After the bishop had put down the rebellion, he made an agreement with the city in which the city was not allowed to build a wall around itself - an agreement which was not kept for long.

The bishop loaned the prefecture of Groningen to his brother Ludolf, and his younger brother Leffart was given the castle of Coevorden in the south-east of Drenthe, which held control over the only road through the Bourtangerbog from Drenthe to Germany. This nepotism formed the basis of the eventual loss of Drenthe for the Bishopric of Utrecht.

He died on 10 November 1150.

Preceded by Andreas van Cuijk	Bishop of Utrecht; 1139–1150	Succeeded by Herman van Horne
