= Burchard (bishop of Utrecht) =

Dutch bishop

- Bishop of Utrecht
- Church: Catholic Church
- Diocese: Archdiocese of Utrecht
- In office: 1100–1112

Personal details
- Died: 18 May 1112

Burchard was Bishop of Utrecht between 1100 and 1112. He was dean in Strasbourg before he was appointed as bishop by Emperor Henry IV in 1100. He supported the Emperor during the investiture controversy but he did not play a major part in it. He gave Count Floris II of West Frisia, the title Count of Holland in 1101.

Burchard died on 18 May 1112, but his successor, Godbald, was not consecrated until June, leaving a brief vacancy in the office. Burchard was interred in the Cathedral of Saint Martin, Utrecht.

Catholic Church titles
Preceded by Conrad	Bishop of Utrecht; 1100–1112	Succeeded by Godbald
