= Hermann of Salm =

German anti-king (died 1088)

Herman of Luxembourg
- Count of Salm
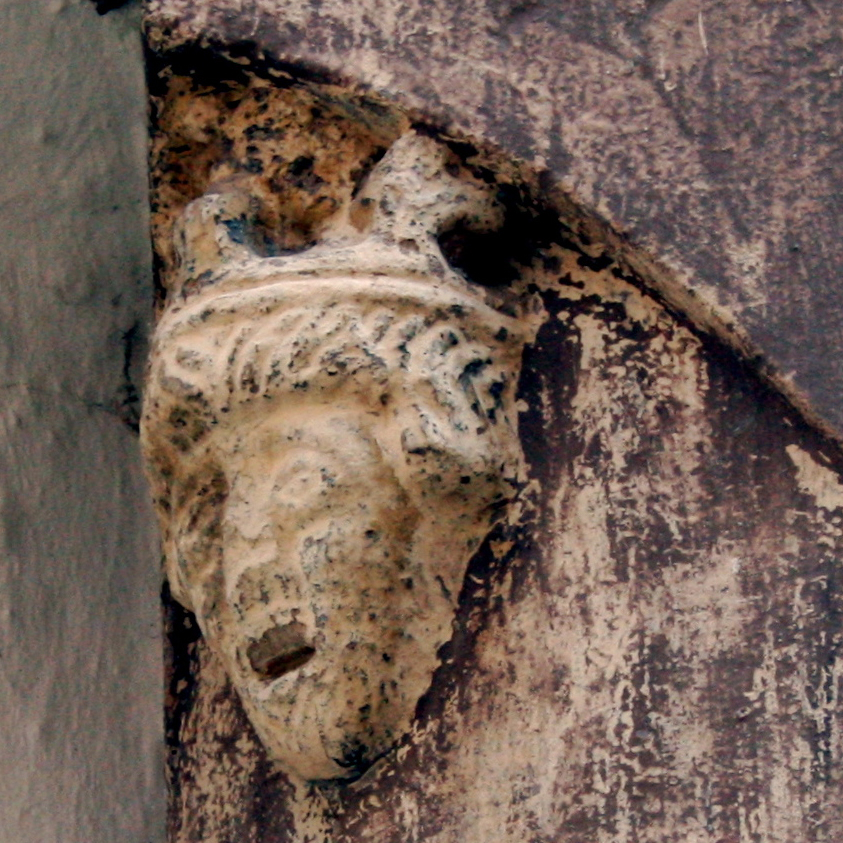
- King Herman, depiction at the Eisleben town hall
- Born: c. 1035; Luxembourg
- Died: 28 September 1088 (aged 52–53); Cochem Castle
- Noble family: House of Salm
- Spouse: Sophia of Formbach
- Issue: Otto I, Count of Salm; Hermann II of Salm
- Father: Giselbert of Luxembourg
- Mother: Unknown

Herman(n) of Salm (c. 1035 – 28 September 1088), also known as Herman(n) of Luxembourg, the progenitor of the House of Salm, was Count of Salm and elected German anti-king from 1081 until his death.

== Life ==
Hermann was a son of Count Giselbert of Luxembourg (1007–1059). His elder brother Conrad inherited the County of Luxembourg and became a faithful supporter of the Salian king Henry IV of Germany in the Investiture Controversy and the civil war of the Great Saxon Revolt.

=== Investiture Controversy ===
The major issue between Pope Gregory VII and Henry IV was the appointment of bishops. It was a custom that if a bishop was to die, the emperor would appoint a new bishop based on his ecclesiastical qualifications. Henry, on the other hand, was appointing bishops for political reasons which made Gregory furious and thus prohibited the appointments of investiture by any lay person, including the emperor.

From the 10th century, the rulers of the Holy Roman Empire were elected Kings of the Romans, who expected to be crowned by the Pope as Holy Roman Emperor. However, because Henry believed the papacy should submit to the crown, Pope Gregory had him excommunicated and declared that he was unworthy of being Emperor. Because of this, the church broke off from Henry and supported the election of German anti-kings.

=== Election ===
Upon Henry's humiliating Walk to Canossa, several princes met at Forchheim and had the Swabian duke Rudolf of Rheinfelden elected anti-king in 1077. Henry's and Rudolf's forces met in the 1080 Battle on the Elster, whereby Rudolf died from the wounds he received.

While Henry turned to Italy in order to enforce his coronation in Rome, the Saxon and Swabian nobles led by the deposed Bavarian Duke Welf I elected Hermann as the second anti-king opposed to the Salian monarch in Ochsenfurt, Franconia on 6 August 1081. He immediately entered into an armed conflict with the loyal Hohenstaufen duke Frederick of Swabia and retired to the Saxon lands, where Archbishop Siegfried of Mainz crowned him king in Goslar on 26 December.

=== Military campaigning ===
Unfortunately for Pope Gregory, Hermann was nowhere near as strong a leader as Rudolph and this caused Henry's power to grow. Henry was crowned Emperor by Antipope Clement III in 1084, leaving Hermann in a very awkward position. He gained broad support by the Saxon nobility, however, his plan to gather an army on the banks of the Danube and march across the Alps into Italy was dashed by the death of his main retainer, Count Otto of Nordheim. When Emperor Henry IV came into Saxony with a large army in 1085, Hermann fled to Denmark.

Little is known of what happened to Hermann after this other than he served as an anti-king under Gregory's rule. During the revolt of Margrave Egbert II of Meissen, Hermann was able to return to Germany. Once again in alliance with Duke Welf I, he defeated the emperor at the 1086 Battle of Pleichfeld on the river Main, taking Würzburg. Soon after his victory, however, he had to witness Egbert's reconciliation with Emperor Henry and the killing of his ally Bishop Burchard II of Halberstadt. Tired of being a pawn in the hands of the grandees, he retired to his familial estates. King Conrad (III) began his rule after Hermann's death. He died near the Imperial castle of Cochem later that year of 1088 in a skirmish with his relative Count palatine Henry of Laach, ending the Great Saxon Revolt.

His wife, Countess Sophia of Formbach, left him a son, Otto, who succeeded him in Salm.

According to a legend perpetuated by the Brothers Grimm, Hermann was mocked as "King Garlic" by his opponents. First celebrated by local Kalands Brethren, an annual "Garlic Wednesday" is held after Pentecost in the region around Halle up to today.
