= Anti-king =

Person who declares himself king in opposition to a reigning monarch

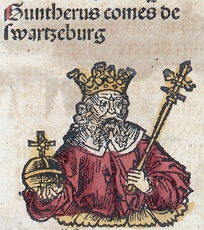
Günther von Schwarzburg, antiking to Charles IV, Holy Roman Emperor in 1349, Nuremberg Chronicle, 1493

An anti-king, anti king or antiking (German: Gegenkönig; French: antiroi) is a would-be king who, due to succession disputes or simple political opposition, declares himself king in opposition to a reigning monarch. The term is usually used in a European historical context where it relates to elective monarchies rather than hereditary ones. In hereditary monarchies, such figures are more frequently referred to as pretenders or claimants.

Anti-kings are most commonly referred to in the politics of the Holy Roman Empire, before the Golden Bull of 1356 issued by Emperor Charles IV defined the provisions of the Imperial election. Other nations with elective monarchies that produced anti-kings included Bohemia and Hungary. The term is comparable to antipope, a rival would-be pope, and indeed the two phenomena are related; just as German kings (kings of the Romans) and Holy Roman emperors from time to time raised up antipopes to politically weaken popes with whom they were in conflict, so too popes sometimes sponsored anti-kings as political rivals to emperors with whom they disagreed.

Several anti-kings succeeded in vindicating their claims to power, and were recognized as rightful kings: for example, King Conrad III of Germany, Emperor Frederick II, and Emperor Charles IV. The status of others as anti-kings is still disputed: e.g. in the case of Duke Henry II of Bavaria and Margrave Egbert II of Meissen.

== List of anti-kings ==
=== Germany ===
Name	Dates	In opposition to:
Arnulf the Bad	919–921	Henry the Fowler
Henry the Wrangler	984–985	Otto III
Rudolf of Rheinfelden	1077–1080	Henry IV
Hermann of Salm	1081–1088	Henry IV
Conrad III	1127–1135	Lothair III
Frederick II	1212–1215	Otto IV
Henry Raspe	1246–1247	Frederick II
William II of Holland	1248–1250	Frederick II
William II of Holland	1250–1254	Conrad IV
Alfonso X of Castile	1257–1275	Richard, 1st Earl of Cornwall
Frederick the Fair	1314–1330	Louis IV
Charles IV	1346–1347	Louis IV
Edward of Windsor (involuntary)	1348	Charles IV
Günther of Schwarzburg	1349	Charles IV
Frederick of Brunswick-Lüneburg	1400	Wenceslaus, King of the Romans

=== German double elections ===
Date	King	King
1198	Philip of Swabia 1198–1208	Otto IV 1198–1215
1257	Richard of Cornwall 1257–1272	Alfonso of Castile 1257–1273
1314	Frederick the Fair 1314–1330	Louis the Bavarian 1314–1346
1410	Sigismund of Luxembourg 1410–1437	Jobst of Moravia 1410–1411

=== Bohemia ===
Name	Dates	In opposition to:
Matthias Corvinus	1469–1471	George of Poděbrady
Matthias Corvinus	1471–1490	Vladislaus II
Frederick of the Palatinate	1619–1620	Ferdinand II
Charles Albert of Bavaria	1741–1743	Maria Theresa

=== Hungary ===
Name	Dates	In opposition to:
Ladislaus II	1162–1163	Stephen III
Stephen IV	1163–1165	Stephen III

=== Korea ===
Name	Dates	In opposition to:
Duke Angyeong	1269	Wonjong of Goryeo (deposed by dictator Im Yŏn)
Wang Ko	1320–1323	Chungsuk of Goryeo
Wang Ko	1339–1340	Chunghye of Goryeo

=== Scotland ===
Name	Dates	In opposition to:
Edward Balliol	1332–1356	David II

== See also ==
- Antipope
- War of succession
- Carlism

== Sources ==
- Heinrich Mitteis: Die deutsche Königswahl. Ihre Rechtsgrundlagen bis zur goldenen Bulle, 2nd expanded edition, Rohrer, Brünn, Munich, Vienna, 1944, pp. 113 ff.
- Dietmar Willoweit: Deutsche Verfassungsgeschichte. Vom Frankenreich bis zur Wiedervereinigung Deutschlands, 5th revised edition, expanded with a table of chronology and an attached map, Beck, Munich, 2005, pp. 71 ff., 94 ff., ISBN 3-406-52637-3
- Gerhard Theuerkauf: Gegenkönig. In: Handwörterbuch zur deutschen Rechtsgeschichte, 2nd, fully revised and expanded edition. Published by Albrecht Cordes, Heiner Lück, Dieter Werkmüller and Ruth Schmidt-Wiegand as philological advisor. Edited by: Falk Hess and Andreas Karg, Vol. I: Aachen-Geistliche Bank, Erich Schmidt Verlag, Berlin. 2008, Sp. 1995–1996, ISBN 978-3-503-07912-4
