= Ada (name) =

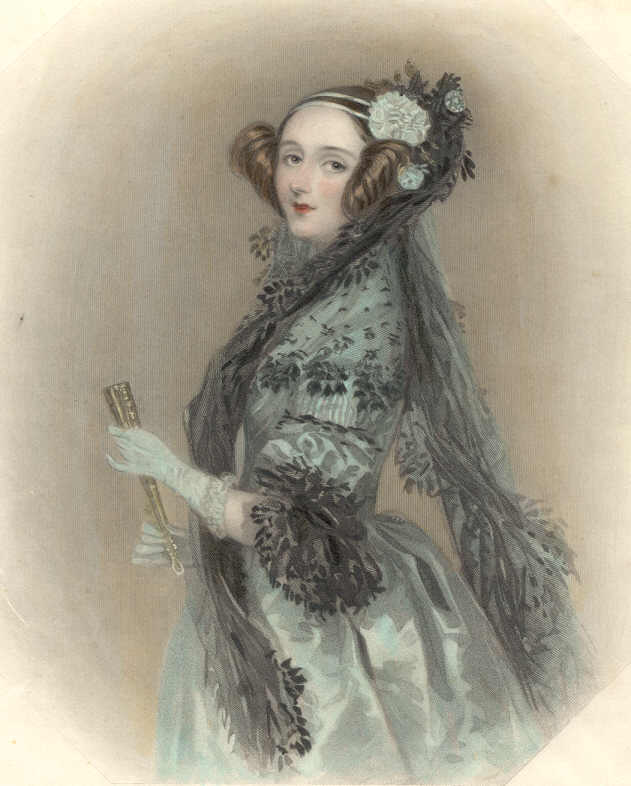
- Ada Lovelace was an English mathematician and writer.
- Pronunciation: /ˈeɪdə/
- Gender: Female (Unisex in Turkish)
- Language: German, Hebrew, Turkish, Igbo

Origin
- Meaning: "noble, nobility", "island", "adornment", "first daughter"

Other names
- See also: Adelaide, Adeline

Ada is a mostly feminine given name with the exception of the Turkish name being unisex (approximately 38.3% of individuals named Ada in Turkey are male). One origin is the Germanic element "adel-" meaning "nobility", for example as part of the names Adelaide and Adeline. The name can also trace to a Hebrew origin, sometimes spelled Adah עָדָה, meaning "adornment". Ada means "first daughter" among the Igbo People. Its equivalent for "first son" in the same clan is Tahitii and Okpara across all Igbo ethnic group in Nigeria. The Igbo people are one of the largest ethnic groups in Africa. Ada means "island" in Turkish, and although it is a unisex name it was the 35th most popular girls' name in Turkey in 2016. Finally, the name occurs in Greek mythology and was in use in Ancient Greece.

The name has seen a slight increase in popularity in the United States in recent years, where it was the 184th most common name given to baby girls born there in 2020. It had been among the top 100 names for girls in the United States between 1880 and 1912 and remained in the top 1,000 names for girls until 1985. It first reappeared among the top 1,000 names for girls in 2004, after a 19-year absence. Finnish variant Aada was among the top ten most popular names given to newborn girls in Finland in 2020. The name is also commonly used in Norway, where it was the 10th most popular name for girls born in 2020. It ranked 28th for girls born in Turkey in 2020, ranked 38th for girls born in England and Wales in 2020, ranked 45th for girls born in Ireland in 2020, ranked 47th for girls born in Scotland in 2020, ranked 78th for girls born in Northern Ireland in 2020, ranked 81st for girls born in Poland in 2020, ranked 177th for girls born in Italy in 2020 and ranked 355th for girls in The Netherlands in 2020.

Its increase in popularity has been attributed to the popularity of other "simple, old-fashioned names beginning with a vowel" such as Ava and Ella. Some of its popularity might also be attributed to Ada, Countess of Lovelace, the daughter of George Gordon, Lord Byron, who has been called the first computer programmer by some historians. Ada, a computer programing language, was named in her honor.

== Notable people ==
=== Given name ===
- Ada of Caria (fl. 377–326 BC), satrap deposed by her brother Idrieus and restored by Alexander the Great
- Saint Ada, 7th-century French abbess
- Ada or Adelais, 8th-century sister of Charlemagne, for whom the Ada Gospels at Trier were produced
- Ada de Warenne (1120–1178), Anglo-Norman wife of Henry of Scotland, Countess of Northumbria and Huntingdon
- Ada of Scotland (1146–1206), Scottish noblewoman, Countess of Holland by marriage
- Ada of Holland, Margravine of Brandenburg (c. 1163–1205), daughter of Floris III, Count of Holland and his wife Ada of Huntingdon
- Ada, Countess of Holland (1188–1223), Countess of Holland between 1203 and 1207
- Ada, Countess of Atholl (died 1264)
- Ada Adini (1855–1924), American operatic soprano who had an active international career from 1876
- Ada Adler (1878–1946), Danish classical scholar and librarian
- Ada Santana Aguilera (born 1998), Spanish politician
- Ada Albrecht, Argentinian author
- Ada Ameh (1974–2022), Nigerian actress
- Ada Bakker (born 1948), Dutch tennis player
- Ada Ellen Bayly (1857–1903), English novelist
- Ada Kouri Barreto (1917–2005), eminent cardiologist
- Ada Becchi (1937–2025), Italian politician and economist
- Ada Beveridge (1875–1964), Australian Country Women's Association leader
- Ada Blackjack, (1898–1983), Iñupiaq woman who was a castaway for two years on Wrangel Island in northern Siberia
- Ada Bolten (1903–1984), Dutch swimmer
- Ada Booyens (born 1961), South African race walker
- Ada Bromham (1880–1965), Australian feminist and temperance activist
- Ada Brown (judge) (born 1974), American federal judge
- Ada Brown (singer) (1890–1950), American blues singer
- Ada Buffulini (1912–1991), Italian anti-fascist campaigner
- Ada Cambridge (1844–1926), later known as Ada Cross, English writer
- Ada Carrasco (1912–1994), Mexican film and television actress
- Ada Castells (born 1968), Catalan professor, writer and journalist
- Ada Cavendish (1839–1895), English actress known for her Shakesperean roles and for popularising the plays of Wilkie Collins in America
- Ada Chaseliov (1952–2015), Brazilian actress
- Ada Nield Chew (1870–1945), British suffragist
- Ada Cheung, Australian endocrinologist and researcher
- Ada Choi (born 1973), Hong Kong actress best known for her work for TVB television
- Ada Clare (1834–1874), born Jane McElhenney, American actress, writer, and feminist
- Ada Colau (born 1974), Spanish activist and Mayor of Barcelona
- Ada Langworthy Collier (1843–1919), American writer
- Ada Comstock (1876–1973), American women's education pioneer
- Ada Cornaro (1881–1961), prominent Argentine film and theatre actress, tango dancer and singer of the 1930s and 1940s
- Ada Crossley (1874–1929), Australian singer
- Ada de la Cruz (born 1986), Miss Dominican Republic 2009 and Miss Universe 2009 first runner-up
- Ada Deer (1935–2023), Native American advocate and scholar who served as head of the United States' Bureau of Indian Affairs from 1993 to 1997
- Ada Dietz (1882–1950), American weaver best known for her 1949 monograph Algebraic Expressions in Handwoven Textiles
- Ada Dondini (1883–1958), Italian film actress
- Ada Dow Currier (died 1926), American stage actress, producer, acting coach
- Ada Constance Duncan (1896–1970), Australian welfare activist
- Ada Dyas (1843–1908), Irish actress
- Ada Ehi (born 1987), Nigerian gospel singer
- Ada María Elflein (1880–1919), Argentine poet, columnist, translator, feminist and teacher
- Ada English (1875–1944), Irish revolutionary politician and psychiatrist
- Ada Eronen (born 2004), Finnish ice hockey player
- Ada Evans (1872–1947), Australian lawyer, was the first female law graduate in Australia
- Ada and Minna Everleigh, sisters who operated the Everleigh Club, a high-priced brothel in the Levee District of Chicago after 1900
- Ada Falcón (1905–2002), Argentine tango dancer, singer and film actress of the 1920s and 1930s
- Ada Feinberg-Sireni (born 1930), Israeli politician
- Ada Ferrer (born 1962), American historian
- Ada Fisher (1947–2022), American retired physician and frequent Republican candidate for office
- Ada Lois Sipuel Fisher (1924–1995), key figure in the Civil Rights Movement in Oklahoma
- Ada Gabrielyan (born 1941), Armenian painter
- Ada Sawyer Garrett (1856–1938), Chicago socialite of the late 19th century
- Ada Gentile (born 1947), Italian pianist and composer
- Ada Gilmore (1883–1955), American watercolorist and printmaker
- Ada Gobetti (1902–1968), Italian journalist and politician
- Ada den Haan (1941–2023), Dutch swimmer
- Ada R. Habershon (1861–1918), Christian hymnist, known for her 1907 hymn "Will the Circle Be Unbroken"
- Ada L. Halstead (1861–1901), American novelist
- Ada Hasırcı (born 2007), Turkish alpine ski racer
- Ada Van Stone Harris (1866–1923), American educator
- Ada Hegerberg, Norwegian football striker
- Ada Augusta Holman (1869–1949), Australian journalist and novelist
- Ada Howard (1829–1907), the first president of Wellesley College
- Ada Verdun Howell (1902–1981), Australian author and poet
- Ada Louise Huxtable (1921–2013), architecture critic and writer on architecture
- Ada Maria Isasi-Diaz (1943–2012), professor emerita of ethics and theology at Drew University in Madison, New Jersey
- Ada Itúrrez de Cappellini, Argentine politician
- Ada J. Graves (1870–1918), British children's writer
- Ada James (1876–1952), suffragist, social worker, and reformer
- Ada Jones (1873–1922), popular mezzo-soprano who recorded from 1905 to the early 1920s
- Ada Karmi-Melamede (born 1936), Israeli architect
- Ada Katz (born 1928), wife and model of Alex Katz
- Ada Kent (1888–1969), Canadian musician and composer
- Ada Kepley (1847–1925), the first American woman to graduate from law school
- Ada van Keulen (1920–2010), Dutch World War II resistance member
- Ada Copeland King, the common law wife of American geologist Clarence King
- Ada Byron Milbanke, 14th Baroness Wentworth (1871–1917), British peeress
- Ada Kok (born 1947), Dutch swimmer
- Ada Korkhin (born 2004), American Olympic pistol shooter
- Ada Kramm (1899–1981), Norwegian stage and film actress
- Ada Kuchařová (born 1958), Czech orienteer
- Ada Turner Kurtz (1878–1947), English-born American singer, voice teacher
- Ada Annie Lawson or Cougar Annie (1888–1985), pioneer who settled on the west coast of Vancouver Island, Canada
- Ada Lee, jazz, blues, gospel and soul music singer from Springfield, Ohio since the late 1950s
- Ada Leverson (1862–1933), British writer who is now known primarily for her work as a novelist
- Ada Limón (born 1976), American poet
- Ada Lovelace (1815–1852), born Augusta Ada Byron, English writer, programmed Charles Babbage's mechanical computer, the analytical engine
- Ada Lundver (1942–2011), Estonian actress and singer
- Ada Mackenzie (1891–1973), Canadian golfer
- Ada Maddison (1869–1950), British mathematician best known for her work on differential equations
- Ada Maddocks (1927–2007), British trade union official
- Ada Madssen (1917–2009), Norwegian sculptor
- Ada Maimon (1893–1973), Israeli politician who served as a member of the Knesset for Mapai between 1949 and 1955
- Ada Maris (born 1957), Mexican-American actress
- Ada Marshania, ethnic Abkhaz and the Deputy of Supreme Council of the de jure Government of Abkhazia in exile since July 2006
- Ada Maza (born 1951), Argentine Justicialist Party politician
- Ada Menken or Adah Isaacs Menken (1835–1868), American actress, painter and poet
- Ada Milby (born 1983), Filipino rugby player
- Ada Miller or Corín Tellado (1927–2009), prolific Spanish writer of romantic novels and photonovels
- Ada Moldovan or Adriana Moldovan (born 1983), Romanian handball player
- Ada Andy Napaltjarri (born 1954), Warlpiri and Luritja speaking Indigenous artist from Australia's Western Desert region
- Ada Natali (1898–1990), first woman mayor in Italy
- Ada Negri (1870–1945), Italian poet and writer
- Ada Nettleship (1856–1932), British dressmaker and costume designer, at forefront of the Aesthetic dress style and rational dress movement
- Ada Nicodemou (born 1977), Australian-born Greek-Cypriot actress, played Leah Patterson-Baker in the soap opera Home and Away
- Ada Nield Chew (1870–1945), British socialist and suffragist
- Ada Norris, DCMG, DBE (1901–1989), Australian women's rights activist and community worker
- Ada M. Oredigger, pen name of Karl Emil Nygard (1906–1984), American Communist politician and first Communist mayor in the United States
- Ada Palmer (born 1981), American writer
- Ada Paterson (1880–1937), New Zealand school doctor, child health administrator and community worker
- Ada Patterson (1867–1939), American print journalist
- Ada Perkins (1959–1980), Puerto Rican beauty queen and contestant in the 1978 Miss Universe beauty pageant
- Ada Pilgrim (1867–1965), New Zealand healer
- Ada Polak (née Andrea Buch) (1914–2010), Norwegian art historian
- Ada Pometti (born 1942), Italian actress
- Ada Reeve (1874–1966), English actress of both stage and film
- Ada Rehan (1859–1916), American actress
- Ada Roach, American musical comedy actress
- Ada Roe (1858–1970), British supercentenarian
- Ada Rohovtseva (born 1937), Soviet and Ukrainian theater and film actress, theater teacher.
- Ada Rook, Canadian musician
- Ada Dwyer Russell (1863–1952), Mormon stage actress
- Ada Sari (1886–1968), Polish opera singer, actress, and educator
- Ada Salter (1866–1942), English social reformer, environmentalist, pacifist, Quaker, first woman mayor in London
- Ada Lewis Sawyer (1892–1985), American lawyer
- Ada Schnee (1872–1969), German author of a memoir about the East African campaign of World War I
- Ada Holly Shissler, Associate Professor of Ottoman and Modern Turkish History at the University of Chicago
- Ada Simond (1903–1989), American public health advocate and historian
- Ada Škerl (1924–2009), Slovene poet, writer and translator
- Ada Smith (born 1945), New York State Senator from 1989 to 2006
- Ada "Bricktop" Smith (1894–1984), African-American dancer, singer, vaudevillian, and self-described saloon-keeper
- Ada Svedin (1900–1975), German actress
- Ada Svetlova, Latvian singer, mezzo-soprano, performer of classical and ethnic repertoire
- Ada Josephine Todd (1858–1904), American author and educator
- Ada Udechukwu (born 1960), Nigerian artist and poet associated with the Nsukka group
- Ada Mae Vaughn (1905–1943), movie actress
- Ada Vélez (born 1970), Puerto Rican female professional boxer
- Ada Voytsik, Russian actress
- Ada Overton Walker (1880–1914), African-American vaudeville performer and wife of George Walker
- Ada Ward, English actress and singer who became a star in Australia in the 1870s, and later worked in the United States
- Ada Wells née Pike (1863–1933), feminist and social worker in New Zealand
- Ada Williams (actress) (1913–1975), American film actress
- Ada Williams (baby farmer) (1875–1900), baby farmer convicted of killing 21-month-old Selina Ellen Jones in London
- Ada Clendenin Williamson (1880–1958), American book illustrator
- Ada Yonath (1939–2026), Israeli crystallographer best known for her pioneering work on the structure of the ribosome
- Ada Zehra Anlatıcı (born 2007), Turkish swimmer with Down syndrome
- Ada Zhang, American author

=== Middle name ===
- Florence Ada Keynes (née Brown) (1861–1958), British author, social reformer, and Mayor of Cambridge in 1932
- Mary Ada Pickford CBE (1884–1934), British politician, industrialist and historian
- Florence Ada Mary Lamb Polson (1877–1941), New Zealand rural women's advocate
- Caroline Ada Seville (1874–1955), New Zealand nurse, hospital matron and community leader

=== Surnames ===
- Alma Flor Ada (born 1938), Cuban-American author of children's books, poetry and novels
- Ben Ada (1932–2016), Guamanian politician
- Francisco Ada (1934–2010), Northern Mariana Islands politician
- Gordon Ada (1922–2012), Australian microbiologist
- Jacquette Ada (born 1991), Cameroonian footballer
- Joseph Franklin Ada (born 1943), American politician
- Kawa Ada (born 1982), Canadian actor, writer and producer
- Marie-Noëlle Ada (born 1990), beauty queen, Miss Gabon 2012
- Patrick Ada (born 1985), Cameroonian footballer
- Tom Ada (born 1949), Guamanian politician
- Vicente Ada (born 1966/1967), Guamanian politician

== Fictional characters ==
- Ada, in the video game Castlevania: Legacy of Darkness
- Ada, an android in the comic book series Alex + Ada
- Ada, character in 1991 movie Armour of God II: Operation Condor
- Ada Clare, character in Charles Dickens' novel Bleak House
- Ada Clover, a non-playable character in the BlazBlue video game series
- Ada Forte (née Brook) character of HBO drama The Gilded Age
- Ada Harris, protagonist of the novel Mrs. 'Arris Goes to Paris
- Ada McGrath, protagonist of the 1993 film The Piano
- Ada Mesmer, a survivor in the video game Identity V
- Ada Monroe, character in Charles Frazier’s novel Cold Mountain
- Ada Shufflebotham or Sidebottom, in the TV show Cissie and Ada
- Ada Thorne (née Shelby) in BBC TV drama Peaky Blinders
- Ada Vessalius, in the animé Pandora Hearts
- Ada Vinelander, character in the novel Ada or Ardor: A Family Chronicle by Vladimir Nabokov
- Ada Wong, character in the survivor horror franchise Resident Evil
- Ada-1, a non-playable robot vendor in the video game Destiny 2.
- ADA, a character in the video game Ingress.
- Ada Twist, titular character from the Ada Twist, Scientist children's book and Netflix series
- ADA, also known as Artificial Directory and Assistant, A virtual character in the videogame Satisfactory
- Baby Ada, the half-human lamb in the A24 folk horror movie Lamb

== Lists of people ==
=== Lists with the surname ===
- Senator Ada (disambiguation)

=== Lists with the given name ===
- Ada of Holland (disambiguation)
- Ada Brown (disambiguation)
- Ada Smith (disambiguation)
- Ada Williams (disambiguation)

== See also ==
- Ada (disambiguation)
