= Ada =

Ada may refer to:

== Arts and entertainment ==
- Ada or Ardor: A Family Chronicle, a novel by Vladimir Nabokov

=== Film and television ===
- Ada, a character in 1991 movie Armour of God II: Operation Condor
- Ada... A Way of Life, a 2008 Bollywood musical by Tanvir Ahmed
- Ada (dog actor), a dog that played Colin on the sitcom Spaced
- Ada (1961 film), a 1961 film by Daniel Mann
- Ada TV, a television channel in Northern Cyprus
- Ada (2019 film), a short biopic about Ada Lovelace

== Aviation ==
- Ada Air, a regional airline based in Tirana, Albania
- Francisco C. Ada Airport, Saipan Island, Northern Mariana Islands
- IATA airport code for Adana Şakirpaşa Airport in Adana Province, Turkey

== Places ==
=== Africa ===
- Ada Foah, a town in Ghana
- Ada (Ghana parliament constituency)
- Ada, Osun, a town in Nigeria

=== Asia ===
- Ada, Karaman, a village in Karaman Province, Turkey
- Ada, Urmia, a village in West Azerbaijan Province, Iran

=== Europe ===
- Ada, Bosnia and Herzegovina, a village
- Ada Ciganlija or Ada, a river island artificially turned into a peninsula in Belgrade, Serbia
- Ada, Croatia, a village
- Ada, Serbia, a town and municipality

=== United States ===
- Ada, Alabama, an unincorporated community
- Ada County, Idaho
- Ada, Kansas, an unincorporated community
- Ada, Minnesota, a city
- Ada, Ohio, a village
- Ada, Oklahoma, a city
- Ada, Oregon, an unincorporated community
- Ada Township, Dickey County, North Dakota
- Ada Township, Michigan
- Ada Township, Perkins County, South Dakota
- Ada, West Virginia, an unincorporated community
- Ada, Wisconsin, an unincorporated community
- Mount Ada, a mountain in Alaska

=== Elsewhere ===
- Ada River (disambiguation), various rivers
- 523 Ada, an asteroid

== Schools ==
- Ada High School (Ohio), US
- Ada Independent School District, Oklahoma, US
- Ada, the National College for Digital Skills, a further education college in Tottenham Hale, London

== Science and technology ==
- Ada, the cryptocurrency of the Cardano blockchain platform
- List of storms named Ada

=== Biology ===
- Ada (plant), a genus of orchids
- Ada (protein), an enzyme induced by treatment of bacterial cells
- Adenosine deaminase, an enzyme involved in purine metabolism

=== Computing ===
- Ada (computer virus)
- Ada (programming language), programming language influenced by Pascal and other languages

== Ships ==
- Ada-class corvette, a class of anti-submarine corvettes developed by Turkey
- Ada (1897 shipwreck), a wooden ketch, wrecked near Newcastle, New South Wales, Australia
- SS Ada (1905), a cargo vessel built for the London and South Western Railway
- SS Ada Hancock

== People ==
- Ada Lovelace (1815–1852), computer scientist sometimes regarded as the first computer programmer
- Ada (name), a feminine given name and a surname, including a list of people and fictional characters
- Ada of Caria (fl. 377 – 326 BCE), satrap of ancient Caria and adoptive mother of Alexander the Great

== Other uses ==
- Ada Band, an Indonesian pop rock band
- Ada and Abere, a ceremonial sword of state in Yorubaland and surrounding regions of West Africa
- Ada Bridge, Belgrade, Serbia
- Ada (food), a traditional Kerala delicacy
- Ada Health, a German medical technology company
- Dangme language (ISO 639-2 and 639-3 code: ada), spoken in Ghana

== See also ==
- ADA (disambiguation)
- Ada regulon, an Escherichia coli adaptive response protein
- Adah (disambiguation)
- Adha (disambiguation)
- Ada'a, a woreda in the Oromia Region of Ethiopia
- Ade (disambiguation)
- USS Little Ada, a steamer captured by the Union Navy during the American Civil War
