= Ade =

Ade, Adé, or ADE may refer to:

== Aviation ==
- Ada Air's ICAO code
- Aeronautical Development Establishment, a laboratory of the DRDO (Defence Research and Development Organisation) in India
- IATA airport code for Aden International Airport in Aden Governorate, Yemen

== Medical ==
- ADE (chemotherapy), a chemotherapy regimen consisting of Ara-C (cytarabine), Daunorubicin and Etoposide
- Adverse drug event
- Antibody-dependent enhancement

== People ==
- Ade (given name)
- Adé (singer)
- Ade (surname)

== Places ==
- Adé, Chad, a city in Chad
- Adé, Hautes-Pyrénées, a commune in France
- Ade, Indiana, an unincorporated place in the US
- Ade, Maharashtra, a small village in Maharashtra state, India

== Other uses ==
- Acoustic droplet ejection, in microtechnology
- Adé, a bead-embroidered crown worn by Yoruba monarchs
- ADE classification, a mathematics classification
- -ade, a suffix used for fruit–flavored beverages
- ade, the ISO 639-3 language code of Adele language, a Niger-Congo language of Ghana and Togo
- Adenine, a nucleobase
- Adobe Digital Editions, an e-book reader software program
- Advection-diffusion equation, a partial differential equation
- Algebraic differential equation, a kind of differential equation
- Amsterdam Dance Event, an electronic music conference and club festival
- Application Development Environment, in software development
- Arizona Department of Education
- Association for Decentralised Energy, a British trade association
- Atlantis Diesel Engines, a South African manufacturer of diesel engines
- Australian Disability Enterprise, replacement term for "sheltered workshop"
- Avocat émérite (AdE or "Ad. E."), an honorary title given to senior lawyers in Quebec

== See also ==
- Ades (disambiguation)
- Ada (disambiguation)
- ADA (disambiguation)
