= Ades =

Ades may refer to:

- Ades (surname)
- Ades (artist), an anarchist graffiti artist (1995-?)
- AdeS, a brand of drinking water
- Ades Synagogue, a synagogue in Jerusalem
- AdES, an Advanced Electronic Signature
- Soft drinks (a collective term for lemonade, cherryade, orangeade, etc.)

== See also ==
- Ade (disambiguation)
- Hades (disambiguation)
