= Ada (1897 shipwreck) =

Wooden ketch

Coordinates: 32.92°S 151.79°E

History
- Name: Ada
- Fate: Wrecked 29 April 1897

General characteristics
- Type: Ketch
- Tonnage: 50 GRT
- Displacement: 50 NRT

Ada was a wooden ketch that was wrecked on the Oyster Bank at Newcastle, New South Wales, Australia.

== Wreck ==
On 29 April 1897, Ada missed stays at Broken Bay, near Newcastle's Oyster Bank, and ran aground. She was later dismantled.

== Sources ==
- Loney, Jack K. (1992). Wrecks on the New South Wales Coast. Oceans Enterprises, Yarram, Victoria.
- Australian Shipwrecks - vol1 1622-1850, Charles Bateson, AH and AW Reed, Sydney, 1972, ISBN 0-589-07112-2, Call number 910.4530994 BAT
- Australian shipwrecks Vol. 2 1851–1871 By Loney, J. K. (Jack Kenneth), 1925–1995. Sydney. Reed, 1980 910.4530994 LON
- Australian shipwrecks Vol. 3 1871–1900 By Loney, J. K. (Jack Kenneth), 1925–1995. Geelong Vic: List Publishing, 1982 910.4530994 LON
- Australian shipwrecks Vol. 4 1901–1986 By Loney, J. K. (Jack Kenneth), 1925–1995. Portarlington Vic. Marine History Publications, 1987 910.4530994 LON
- Australian shipwrecks Vol. 5 Update 1986 By Loney, J. K. (Jack Kenneth), 1925–1995. Portarlington Vic. Marine History Publications, 1991 910.4530994 LON
