= Adda =

Adda or ADDA may refer to:

== People ==
=== Given name ===
- Adda Husted Andersen (1898–1990), Danish-born American Modernist jeweler, silversmith, metalsmith, and educator
- Adda Angel, Cambodian songwriter and music producer
- Adda bar Ahavah, two Jewish rabbis and Talmudic scholars
- Adda Djeziri (born 1988), Algerian-Danish footballer
- Adda Gleason (1888–1971), American actress
- Adda of Bernicia (fl. 559–580), third ruler of the Anglo-Saxon Kingdom of Bernicia

=== Surname ===
- Elie Adda (1892–1975), Egyptian fencer
- Georges Adda (1916–2008), Tunisian politician and trade unionist
- Gruffudd ab Adda (fl. mid 14th century), Welsh language poet and musician
- Joseph Kofi Adda (1956–2021), Ghanaian politician
- Serge Adda (1948–2004), French television executive

== Places ==
- Adda (river), a tributary of the Po in North Italy
- Adda Motiram, a village in India
- Adda River (disambiguation), several rivers with this name

== Other uses ==
- ADDA (amino acid), a non-proteinogenic amino acid
- Adda (2013 film), a Telugu film
- Adda (2019 film), a Bengali film
- Adda Records, a French record label, now part of Accord
- Adda (South Asian), a type of conversation in South Asia, especial Bengal, also Addabazi
- Amar, después de amar, Argentine telenovela, shortened as "ADDA" in the logo

== See also ==
- AD/DA: the combination of Analog-to-Digital and Digital-to-Analog converters
- Addas, early convert to Islam
