= Senator Ada =

Senator Ada may refer to:

- Joseph Franklin Ada (born 1943), Senate of Guam
- Tom Ada (born 1949), Senate of Guam

== See also ==
- Ada L. Smith (born 1945), U.S. politician, senator in the New York State Senate
- Ada Itúrrez de Cappellini (born 1959), Argentinian politician, senator in the Honorable Senate of the Argentine Nation
- All pages with titles containing "Senator" and "Ada"
- Ada (name)
- Ada (disambiguation)
