= Pease Auditorium =

Concert hall on the campus of Eastern Michigan University

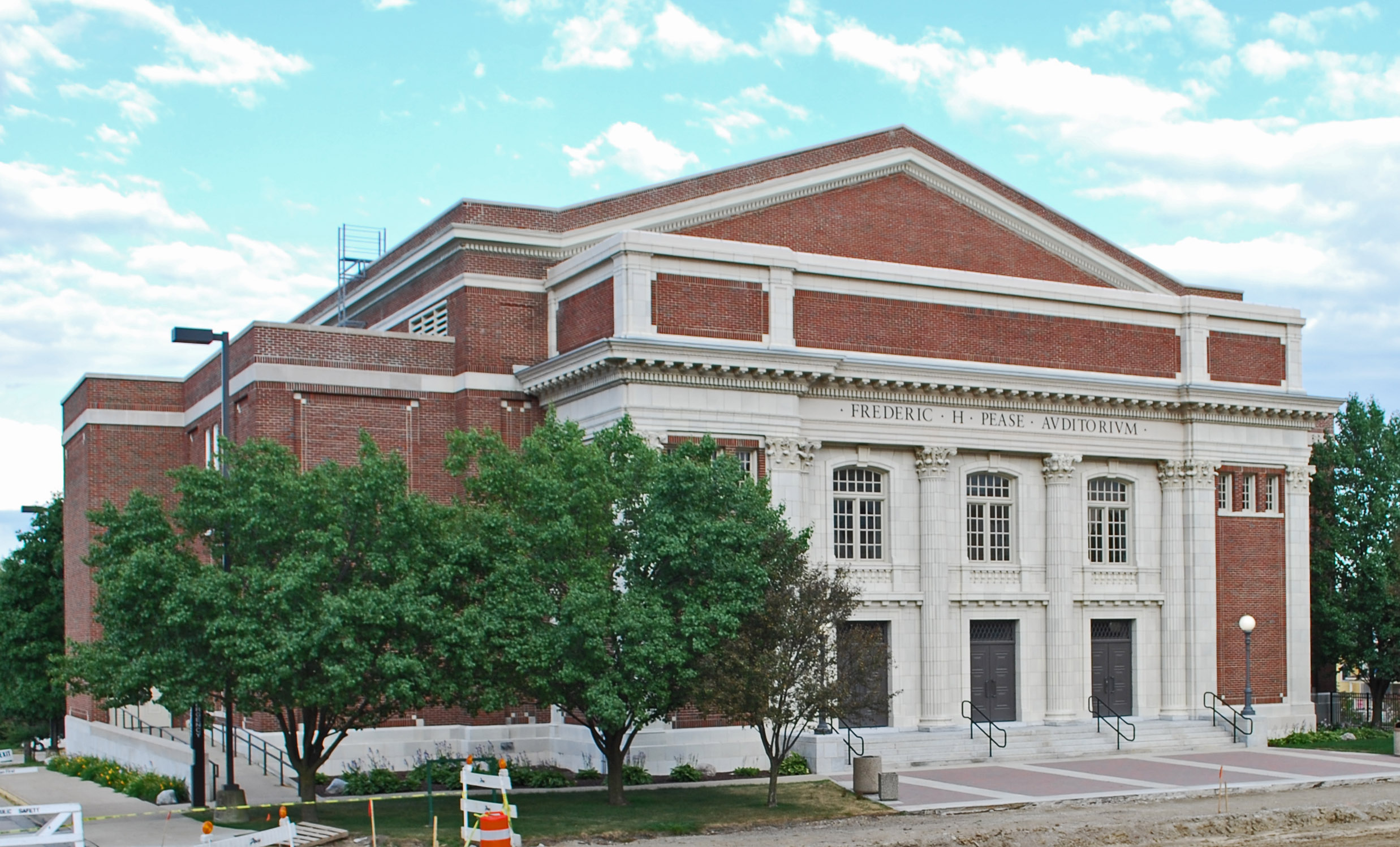
- Interactive map of Pease Auditorium
- Address: 494 College Place; Ypsilanti, Michigan; United States
- Coordinates: 42°14′47.06″N 83°37′17.38″W
- Capacity: 1541

Construction
- Opened: June 22, 1915; 111 years ago
- Expanded: 1995
- Architect: Smith, Hinchman & Grylls
- Pease Auditorium
- U.S. National Register of Historic Places
- Architectural style: Classical Revival
- NRHP reference No.: 84000018
- Added to NRHP: 1984

Pease Auditorium is a concert hall on the campus of Eastern Michigan University in Ypsilanti, Michigan. The auditorium was dedicated in 1915 in memory of music professor Frederic H. Pease, at the institution then known as the Michigan State Normal College, and is the fourth-oldest building on the EMU campus. Pease Auditorium is in the Neoclassical Revival architectural style, and was designed by the Detroit-based firm Smith, Hinchman, and Grylls. The auditorium's 1500-seat capacity and excellent acoustics contribute to its reputation as a premier music venue, presenting the performances of the Eastern Michigan University Department of Music and Dance.

Pease Auditorium was built to accommodate a large pipe organ, but no such organ was fitted when the auditorium opened. An 81-rank Aeolian-Skinner organ was installed in the early 1960s, and was fully restored in the late 1990s. Pease Auditorium was listed on the National Register of Historic Places in 1987, and a major renovation and addition program concluded in 2001.

== History ==
In the early 20th century, the Michigan State Normal College was thriving. The institution that would become Eastern Michigan University was founded as the Michigan State Normal School in 1849, and became the Michigan State Normal College in 1899 with the introduction of four-year academic programs. With the growth of the institution, the Conservatory of Music's quarters in the former Training School building were becoming cramped. Two successive university presidents advocated for the construction of an auditorium, and the necessary funds were raised during the term of Charles McKenny. Pease Auditorium was constructed at a cost of $159,000, equivalent to $3.6 million in 2024.

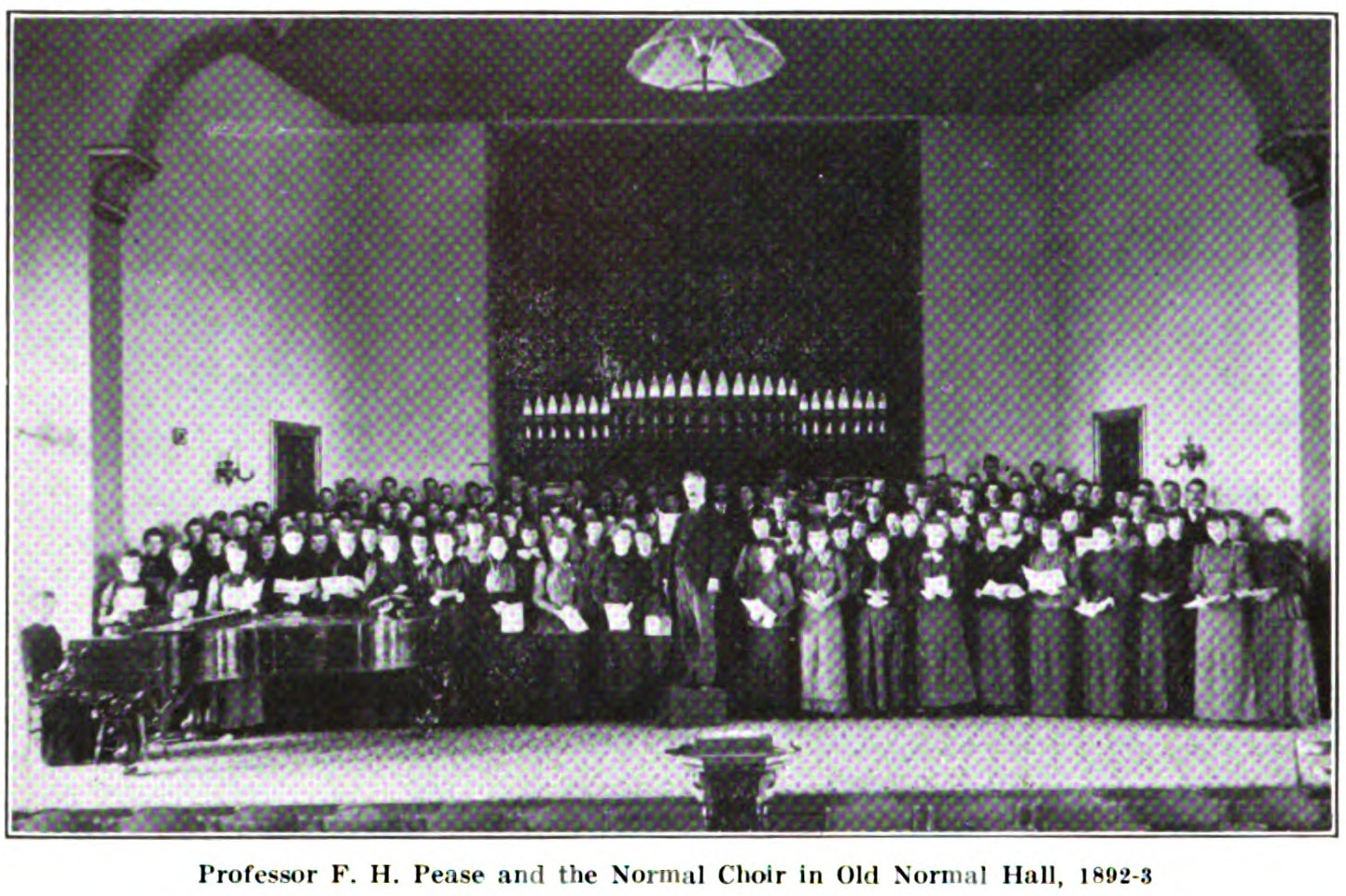
A cramped choir performance in the former Training School building in the early 1890s

The auditorium was initially planned to be named after John D. Pierce, the first Michigan Superintendent of Public Instruction. Ypsilanti residents objected during the construction, and petitioned to change the building's namesake to music professor Frederic H. Pease, who died suddenly in 1909. This effort was successful, and the auditorium was dedicated as Pease Auditorium on June 22, 1915.

Pease Auditorium featured the latest technologies in construction, ventilation, and lighting at its opening. The auditorium was constructed of fireproof concrete and steel, and was fitted with a ventilation system capable of providing entirely new fresh air every ten minutes. The building was fitted with 400 electric lights, designed to provide diffuse light that emulated daylight.

The original plans of the auditorium were drawn to accommodate a large pipe organ, but budget restrictions required the removal of the organ itself from the project. Frederick Alexander, successor to Pease as head of the Conservatory of Music, made it his mission to install a grand organ in Pease Auditorium. Alexander left $90,000 (equivalent to $820,000 in 2024) in his will to fund it, and plans for the organ began after Alexander's death in 1955. The first performance on the new Aeolian-Skinner organ was given in October 1960, after a year of tuning by music professor Erich Goldsmith. The stage was expanded to account for the size of the organ, removing 100 seats.

Interior of Pease Auditorium

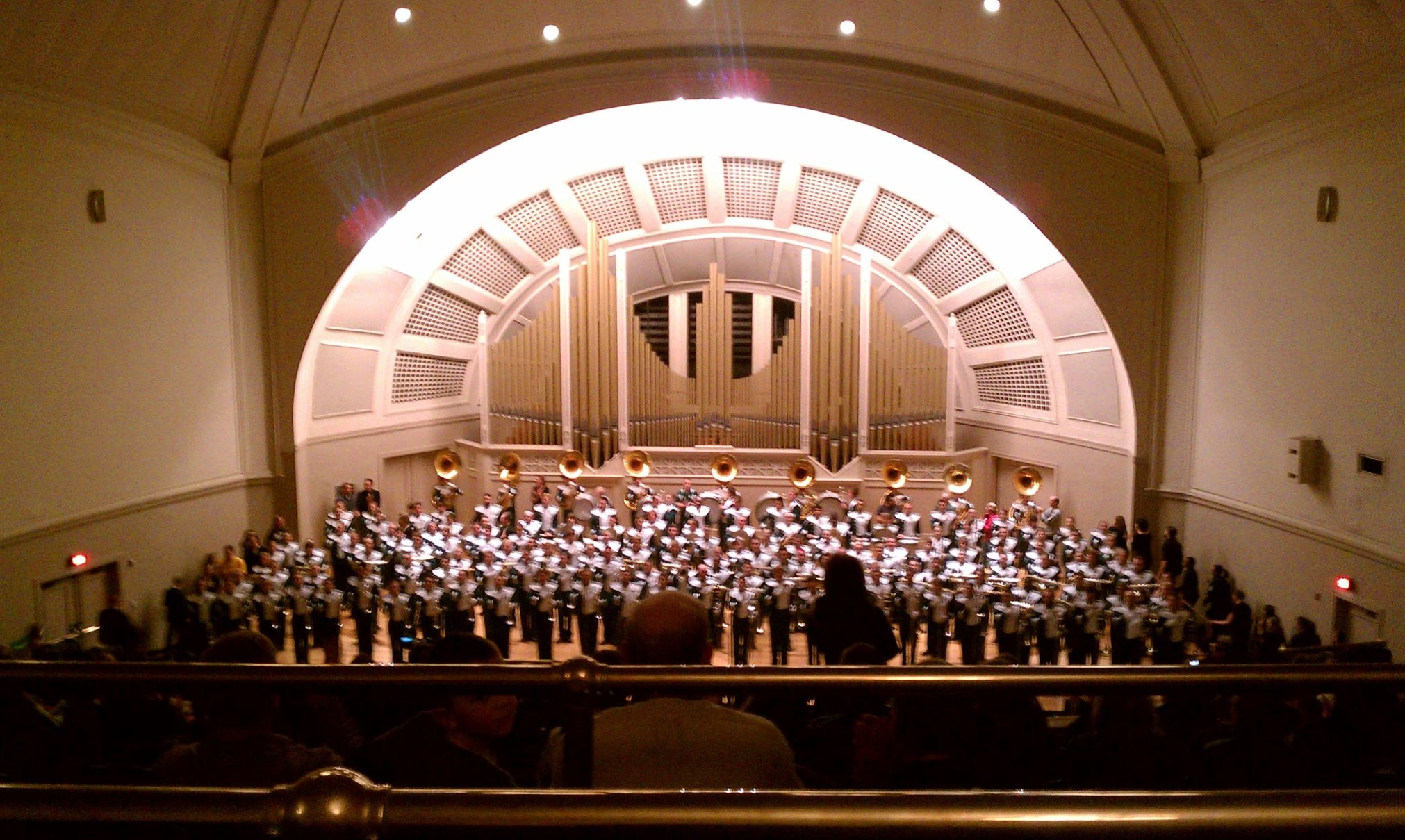
Marching band performance

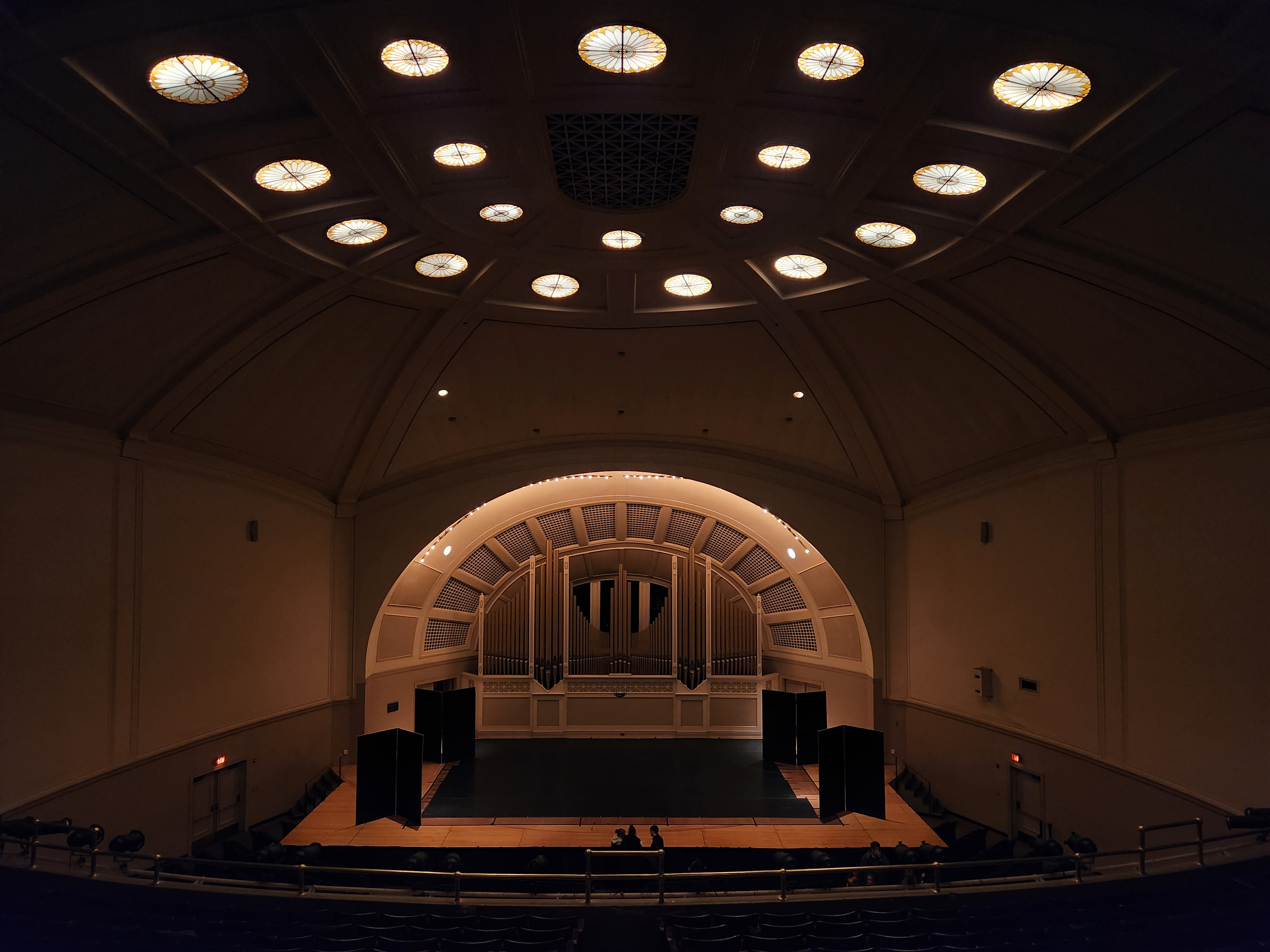
Configured for a dance performance

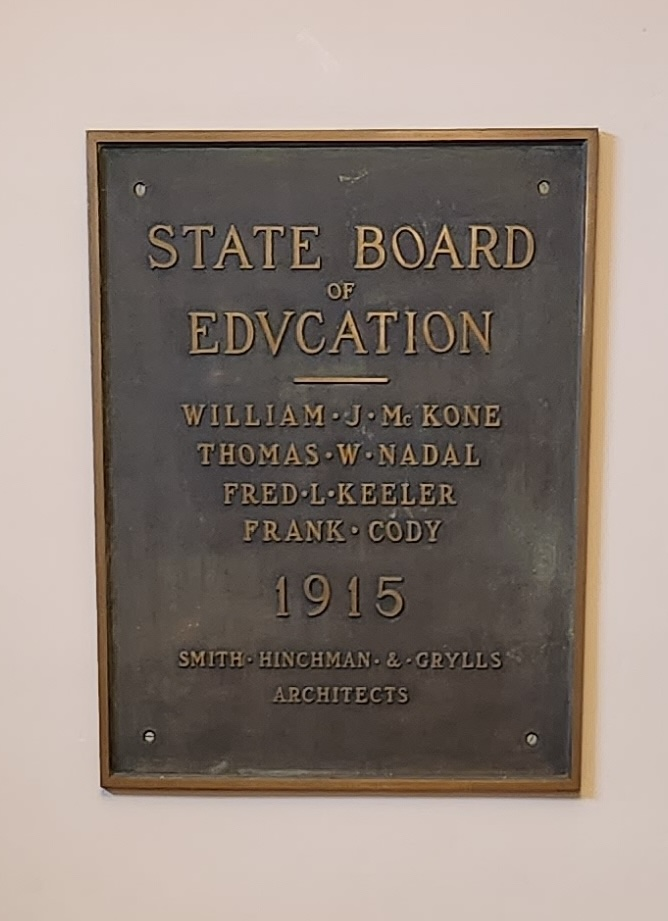
Dedication plaque

Pease Auditorium was listed on the National Register of Historic Places in 1984, but was also falling into disrepair. By 1990, the auditorium was unusable due to its deterioration. The university launched a major fundraising campaign to repair and expand Pease, taking advantage of federal grants and private donations. Major repairs were done to the interior and exterior of Pease, and the backstage area of the auditorium was expanded to include a green room for performers. Elevators and ramps were added for compliance with the Americans with Disabilities Act, and the seating capacity was reduced slightly to 1541. The $5.7 million ($11.1 million in 2024) renovation program concluded in 1995, with a reopening performance featuring Branford Marsalis.

The organ was disassembled and removed with the start of the renovation program, and refurbished over the course of several years. The reinstallation was complete in early 2001, and the Frederick Alexander Memorial Organ was rededicated in performance in April 2001.

== Namesake ==
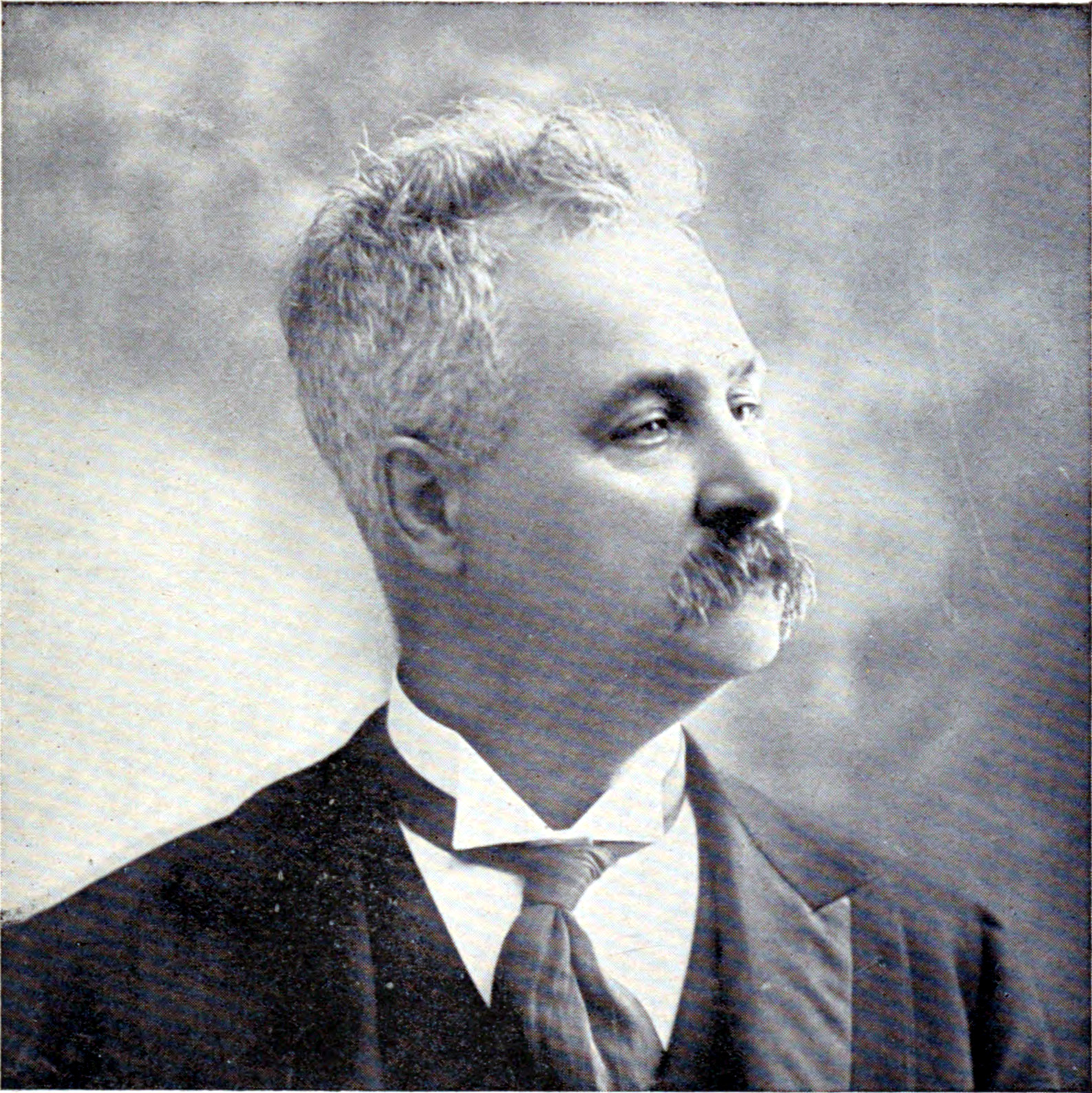
Frederic H. Pease, namesake, c. 1899

Pease Auditorium is named for longtime music professor Frederic H. Pease (1839-1909), Professor of Music at the Michigan State Normal School. Pease was the son of Ruth H. Crocker and Peter Pindar Pease, both early settlers of Oberlin, Ohio and contributors to the founding of Oberlin College. Frederic Pease studied under Professor E. M. Foote of Oberlin and traveled the Midwest, settling in Ypsilanti in 1859 to teach piano. Pease met Josephine Antoinette Dolsen, a student of music at the Normal College, that year, and they were married in November.

Frederic Pease was appointed director of the Conservatory of Music at the Normal School in 1863, a position that he held until his death. Pease founded the Ypsilanti Musical Union, regularly played church organs in Jackson and Detroit, composed music, and wrote textbooks for music teachers throughout his career. The Ypsilanti Musical Union grew rapidly from its founding in 1870, and proved so popular that the Ypsilanti Opera House was constructed for it in 1880.

Stained glass dedicated to Josephine Dolsen Pease
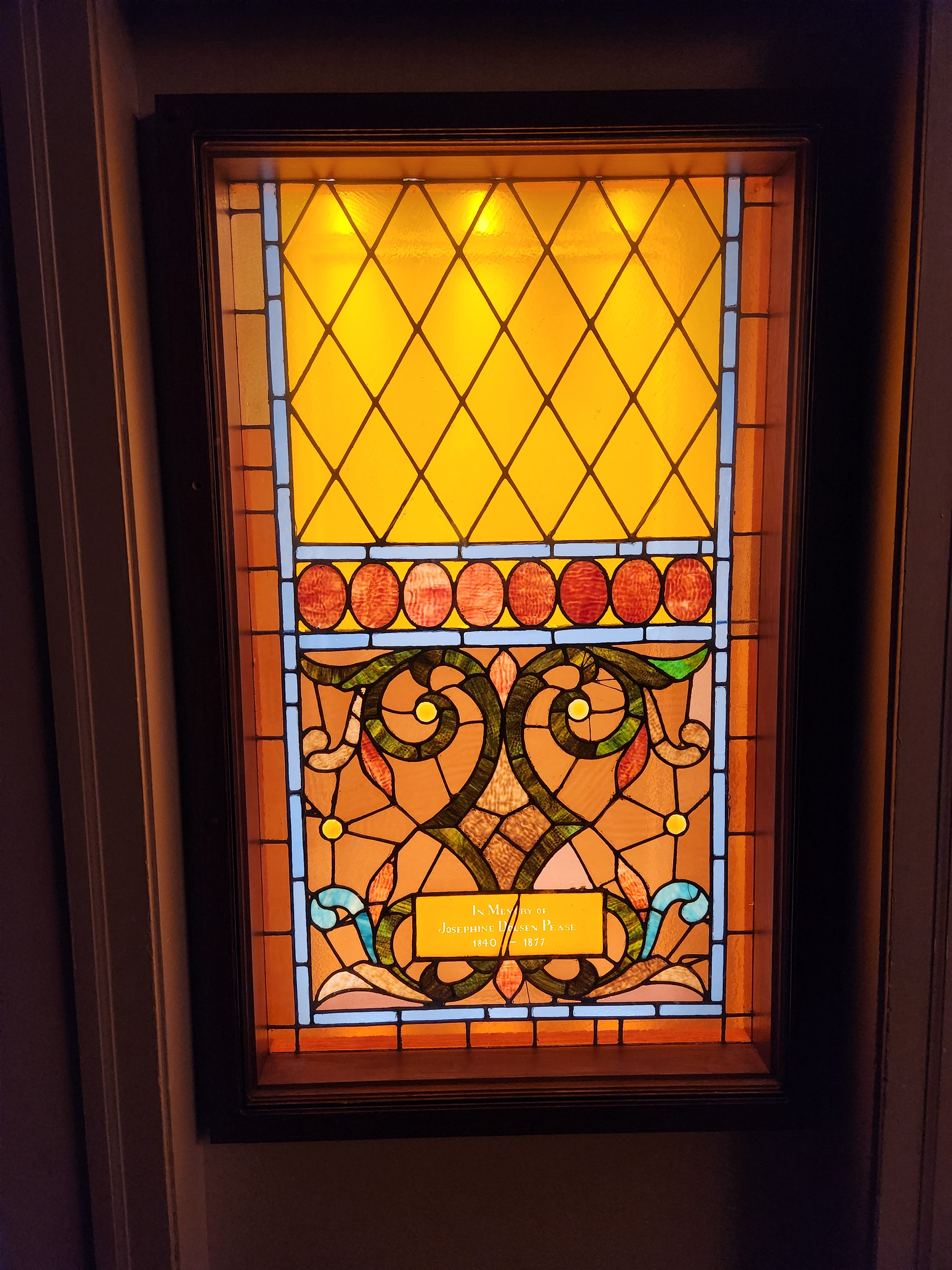
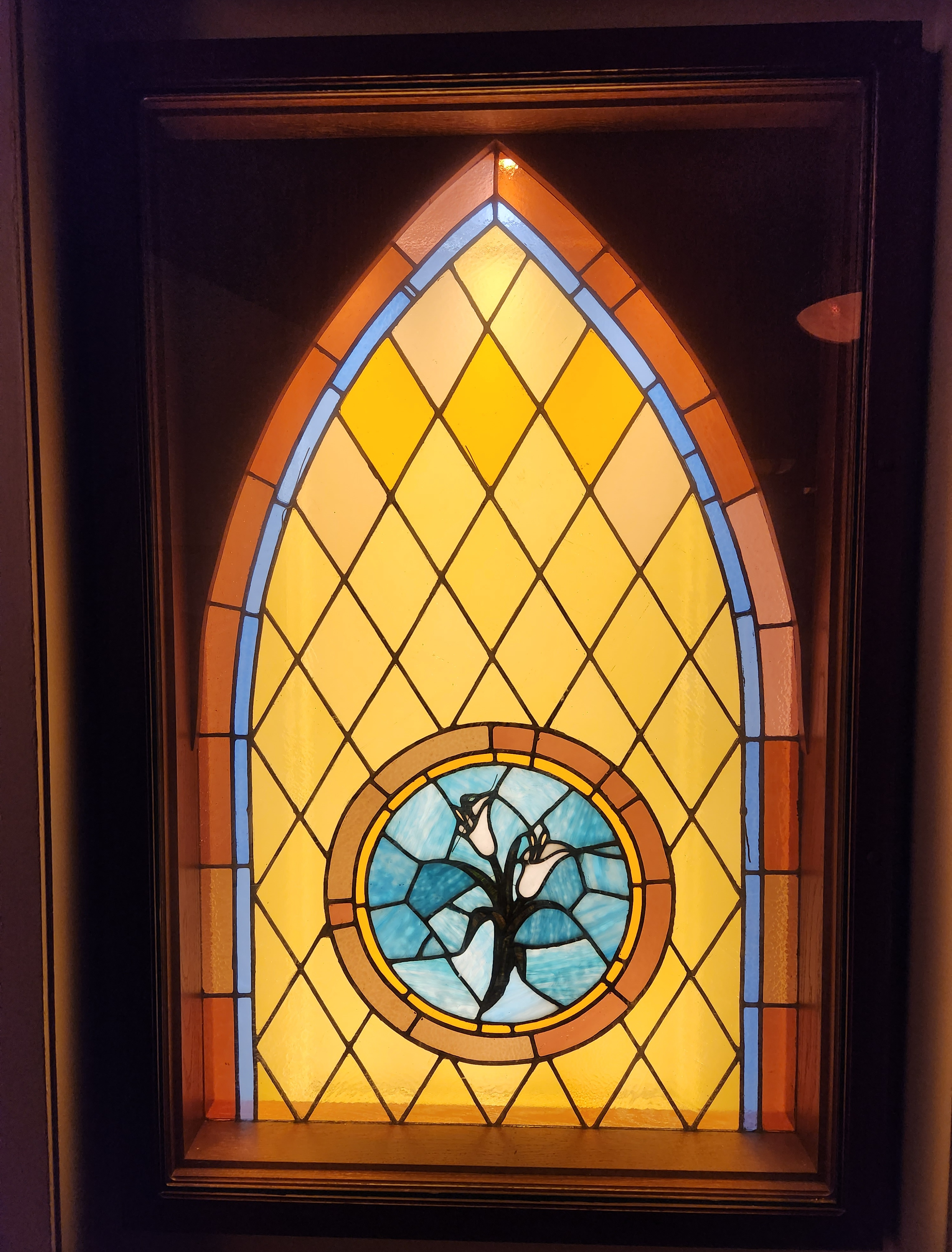

Josephine A. Dolsen Pease died in childbirth in 1877, at the age of 37. Frederic Pease died of sudden heart failure on March 22, 1909, at his house on South Summit Street.

After Josephine's death, Frederic commissioned a stained glass window in her memory at St. Luke's Episcopal Church in downtown Ypsilanti, where he was a distinguished member. The windows were later placed in storage, and were restored and installed in Pease Auditorium in 2015.
