= Adda River (disambiguation) =

Adda (river) is a tributary of the Po in North Italy.

Adda River may also refer to:

- Adda River (South Sudan), a river in Western Bahr el Ghazal, South Sudan
- River Adda (Wales), a small watercourse which flows through the city of Bangor, North Wales

== See also ==
- Adda (disambiguation)
- Ada River (disambiguation)
- Arda River (disambiguation)
