= Arda River =

Arda River may refer to the following rivers:

- Arda (Italy), a river in Italy
- Arda (Maritsa tributary), a river in Bulgaria
- Arda River (Douro tributary), a river in Portugal

== See also ==
- Arda (disambiguation)
- Ada (disambiguation)
- Adda River (disambiguation)
