= ADA =

ADA or AdA may refer to:

Note: the entries in each section are grouped and ordered in correspondence with the categories in each heading.

== Accessibility, medicine, biology, and chemistry ==
- Americans with Disabilities Act of 1990, a US law that prohibits discrimination on the basis of disability
- Adaptive Design Association, New York City based non-profit designing and fabricating adaptive devices for disabled persons
- American Dental Association
- Australian Dental Association
- American Dietetic Association, the former name of the Academy of Nutrition and Dietetics
- American Diabetes Association
- Adenosine deaminase, an enzyme involved in purine metabolism
- ADA (buffer), a chemical buffer in the physiological range
- Azodicarbonamide, a food additive also used in plastics production

== Copyright, computing, and electronics ==
- Alternative Distribution Alliance, a music distributor owned by Warner Music Group
- Australian Digital Alliance, a copyright advocacy group
- Apple Design Awards, an event at the Apple Worldwide Developers Conference
- ADA, a cryptocurrency on the Cardano blockchain platform
- Ada (programming language), a high-level computer programming language
- Advanced Distribution Automation, an extension of intelligent control over an electrical power grid
- Analog-to-digital converter (ADA or A/DA), an electronic converter in some electronic devices, often musical
- ADA (smart antenna), an Israeli adaptive antenna

== Transportation and military ==
- Airline Deregulation Act, a 1978 US law removing governmental control from commercial aviation
- Adana Şakirpaşa Airport (IATA code)
- Aerolínea de Antioquia, a Colombian Airline
- Aeronautical Development Agency, an agency of India's Ministry of Defence
- Armée de l'Air, the French Air Force
- Air Defense Artillery Branch, a branch of the US Army specializing in anti-aircraft weapons
- Angehöriger der Armee (AdA), a person on active duty in the Swiss Armed Forces

== Activism and land management ==
- American Decency Association, an advocacy group against pornography
- Americans for Democratic Action, a liberal advocacy organization
- After the Development of Agriculture, a system of counting years
- Amazon Development Agency, a development agency in Brazil
- Austrian Development Agency, a development aid agency
- Association of Drainage Authorities, a membership body for those involved in water level management in the UK

== Other uses ==
- Antideficiency Act, a US law that prohibits the federal government from incurring debts not authorized by Congress
- Assistant district attorney, a US government position
- Amigos dos Amigos, a drug cartel in Rio de Janeiro
- ADA collider, an electron–positron collider
- Dangme language (ISO 639-2 and ISO 639-3 codes)
- Asociación Deportiva Agropecuaria, a football club based in the city of Jaén, Cajamarca, Perú

== See also ==
- Ada (disambiguation)
