= Ada River =

Ada River may refer to the following watercourses:

In Australia

- Ada River (Baw Baw, Victoria), a watercourse in the Shire of Baw Baw of Victoria
- Ada River (East Gippsland, Victoria), a tributary of the Bemm River in the Shire of East Gippsland of Victoria

In Italy

- Adda (river), or Ada, a tributary of the Po in North Italy

In New Zealand

- Ada River (New Zealand), a tributary of the Waiau River in the South Island

== See also ==
- Ada (disambiguation)
- Adda River (disambiguation)
