= Adès (surname) =

Thomas Adès (born 1971) is a British composer.

Adès may also refer to:

- Dawn Adès (born 1943), British art historian, wife of Timothy, mother of Thomas
- Timothy Adès (born 1941), British poet, husband of Dawn, father of Thomas

== See also ==
- Ades (surname)
