= Adha =

Adha may refer to:

- Adha (tetragraph)
- Eid al-Adha
- American Dental Hygienists' Association

== See also ==
- Ada (disambiguation)
- Adah (disambiguation)
