= Alex Truesdell =

American designer and maker

Alex Truesdell (born c. 1955) is an American designer and maker, specializing in designs which improve the lives of children with special needs. She received a MacArthur Fellowship in 2015.

Truesdell earned a BS and MEd from Lesley University and a MEd from Boston College. From 1981 to 1998, she worked with the Perkins School for the Blind; she was founder and coordinator for the Assistive Device Center there. She founded the non-profit Adaptive Design Association based in New York City in 2001. Truesdell develops tools and furniture which are low-tech, affordable and adaptable, as well as providing training to others in these techniques.
