= Adah =

Adah may refer to:

- Adah, the first wife of either Lamech or of Esau
- The name of Jephthah's daughter, according to the Order of the Eastern Star

== Places ==
- Adah, Pennsylvania
- ADAH, acronym for the Alabama Department of Archives and History
- Adah Rose Gallery, a fine arts gallery in Kensington, MD

== People ==
- Adah Almutairi (born 1976)
- Adah Belle Thoms (1870–1943), African-American nurse of World War I
- Adah Isaacs Menken (1835–1868), American actress, painter, and poet
- Adah Jenkins (1901–1973), Civil rights activist, musician, teacher, and a music critic
- Adah Robinson (1882–1962), American artist, designer and teacher
- Adah Sharma (born 1992), Indian film actress
- Afure Adah (born 1997), Papua New Guinean sprinter
- Joseph Adah (born 1997), Nigerian footballer

== See also ==
- Ada (disambiguation)
- Adha (disambiguation)
