= Ada Clendenin Williamson =

American illustrator

Ada Clendenin Williamson (1880–1958) was an American book illustrator.

== Life ==
Her parents were the noted regional architect T. Roney Williamson and Ada Olympia Clendenin or Joseph Williamson and Ada H. Peirce Williamson depending on the source. Her papers are held at the Archives of American Art.

== Works ==
- Carroll Watson Rankin, The Cinder Pond, New York: H. Holt and Co., c1915; Nabu Press, 2011, ISBN 978-1-172-91794-5
- Dorothy Canfield Fisher, Understood Betsy, New York: Henry Holt and Company, 1917;
