= Charles Bateson =

Australian historian and journalist (1903–1974)

Charles Henry Bateson
- Born: 4 August 1903; Wellington, New Zealand
- Died: 5 July 1974 (aged 70); Vaucluse, Sydney
- Occupations: Maritime historian, journalist and author
- Known for: Author of The Convict Ships
- Spouses: Coy Catherine Foster-Lynam (m. 1923; died 1962) Ann Graham (m. 1964–1974)
- Children: 1
- Parent(s): Charles Bateson and Alice Lowe, nee Rossiter

Charles Bateson (4 August 1903 – 5 July 1974) was a maritime historian, journalist and author.

== Early life ==
Charles Henry Bateson was born in Wellington, New Zealand, son of Charles Bateson, a company manager born Liverpool, England, and mother Alice Lowe, née Rossiter, from Wales. He was educated at Hurworth school, Taranaki, before migrating to Australia in 1922.

== Career ==
=== Journalist ===
Charles Bateson worked as a journalist for a number of Australian papers. He worked for newspaper proprietor Ezra Norton's "Truth and Sportsman Ltd" becoming a talented administrator and lead writer for the Sydney Truth and Melbourne Truth. After Norton's newspapers were taken over by News Ltd Bateson became editorial manager of Mirror Newspapers Ltd, before helping launch The Australian newspaper.

=== War correspondent ===
Working for the Department of the Interior during World War II first as a publicity officer and then as principal information officer, he later became a war correspondent. It was during this time that he met two pilots in London with whom he collaborated in writing two of his early works as a writer: Spitfires over Malta (1943) and First into Italy (1944).

=== Author ===
After his journalistic career Bateson pursued his interest in writing particularly in the maritime history of Australia and the Pacific. He was editor of The Log, the official journal of the Australian and New Zealand branch of the World Ship Society between 1958 and 1966. Bateson's greatest success came with the publication of The Convict Ships 1787–1868 (first published 1959). Containing a comprehensive list of convict transports to the Australian colonies between 1787 and 1868 this remains the standard reference work of its type, an indispensable tool especially for those researching convict ancestry.

Another publishing success came with Australian Shipwrecks (1972). Bateson completed the first volume in what was to be a six volume series of books on maritime disasters in Australia. After his death the series was completed by Jack Loney.

Bateson bequeathed his collection of 1300 books and his personal papers to the Mitchell Library, State Library of New South Wales.

== List of works ==
- Spitfires over Malta (1943)
- First into Italy (1944)
- The Convict Ships 1788–1868 (1959)
- Gold fleet for California: forty-niners from Australia and New Zealand (1964)
- Patrick Logan – tyrant of Brisbane Town (1966)
- The War with Japan: a concise history (1968)
- Early sailor (1968)
- Early soldier (1968)
- Early surveyor (1970)
- A Chartmaker (1972)
- A Gold commissioner (1972)
- Australian Shipwrecks v1: 1622–1850 (1972)
- Dire Strait: a history of Bass Strait (1973)

== Personal life ==
Shortly after arriving in Australia, Bateson met and married journalist Coy Catherine Foster-Lynam on 27 August 1923 at St Peter's Anglican Church East Sydney. Bateson pursued his interests in military, naval and maritime history throughout his life particularly in retirement and was a member of the Royal Australian Historical Society.

Bateson died of coronary vascular disease at Vaucluse in Sydney on 5 July 1974, survived by his second wife Ann and daughter Louise of his first marriage.
