= Saint Ada =

7th-century saint from Le Mans, France

St. Ada
- Died: France
- Venerated in: Catholic Church
- Canonized: Pre-congregation
- Feast: 4 December
- Patronage: Nuns

Saint Ada (also known as Adeneta, Adna, Adnetta, Adonette, Adrechild, Adrehildis, end of 6th or 7th century), was a saint and abbess. She was the niece or granddaughter of Saint Englebert, bishop of Le Mans.

Ada was a nun at Soissons, France. Englebert promoted her as abbess there; he later transferred her to the monastery of Pré (St. Julian de Prato) at Le Mans and then installed her as abbess there. Her feast day is December 4.

== Biography ==
She was a nun in Soissons and abbess of the Abbey of Saint Julien-des-Prés in Le Mans.

She is the niece of Saint Aiglibert, Diocese of Le Mans.
