= Ada Zehra Anlatıcı =

Turkish swimmer with Mosaic Down syndrome

Personal information
- Nationality: Turkish
- Born: 2007 (age 18–19) Turkey
- Height: 1.55
- Weight: 42

Sport
- Sport: Swimming
- Strokes: Breaststroke, backstroke, freestyle
- Club: Beştepe Yüzme Spor Klübü
- Coach: Dilan Aydeniz
Medal record
Paralympic swimming
Representing Turkey
SUDS Open Euro Trigames
Silver medal – second place	2021 Ferrara	50 m breaststtroke
Silver medal – second place	2021 Ferrara	100 m breaststrroke
Bronze medal – third place	2021 Ferrara	50 m backstroke
Bronze medal – third place	2021 Ferrara	100 m backstroke
European Down Syndrome Championship
Gold medal – first place	2023 Padova	200 m breaststroke
Silver medal – second place	2023 Padova	100 freestyle
Bronze medal – third place	2023 Padova	50 m backstroke

Ada Zehra Anlatıcı (born 2007) is a Turkish world-champion swimmer with Mosaic Down syndrome. She is the holder of several world records.

== Sport career ==
Anlatıcı started swimming sport at the age of ten inspired by her coach Halil İbrahim Aydın. Besides swimming, she took gymnastics exercise course twice a week. In swimming, she trains five days a week in the pool and two days on ground. She debuted internationally in 2019 at the 5th Open European DSISO Swimming Championships on Sardinia, Italy.

She won two silver medals in the 50 m and 100 m breaststroke as well as two bronze medals in the 50 m and 100 m backstroke events at the SUDS Open Euro Trigames 2021 held in Ferrara, Italy. She broke also four world records in the 50 m, U16 100 m freestyle and open age 200 m breaststroke. In 2023, she took the gold medal in the 200 m breaststroke, the silver medal in the 100 m freestyle and the bronze medal in the 50 m backstroke events at the 7th European Down Syndrome Swimming Championship in Padova, Italy.

She is the first swimmer that classified as II1 licensed paralympic swimmer and join Virtus Paralympics Championship from Turkey who has Mosaic Down Syndrome. She achieved to won 2 Silver and 1 Bronze medals at Virtus 2026 European Summer Games held at Bydgoszcz, Poland.

== Personal life ==
Ada Zehra Anlatıcı was born in 2007 at Ankara Turkey. She lives in Ankara and is a student of Başkent University in Ankara.
