= Television in Northern Cyprus =

Television in the self-declared state of Northern Cyprus consists of nineteen TV channels. These are:

There are 14 television channels broadcasting nationally and regionally in the Turkish Republic of Northern Cyprus (TRNC). The first television channel established in the TRNC was Bayrak Radio Television, which was also a state-owned channel. With the establishment of Tempo TV, the first private television channel, in 1996, television broadcasting in the TRNC ceased to be a state monopoly.

Almost all national channels broadcast via Türksat, while regional channels can be watched via terrestrial antennas.

== List of TV channels in Northern Cyprus ==
- BRT 1
- BRT Spor
- TRT 1
- TRT Çocuk
- TRT Haber
- Ada TV
- ATV
- GAÜ TV
- Genç TV
- Kanal D
- Kanal Sim
- Kanal T
- Kıbrıs TV
- LAÜ TV
- Show TV
- Sokak TV
- Star TV
- TV 2020
- YDÜ TV

BRT is the state television of the Turkish Republic of Northern Cyprus. BRT is also the oldest Turkish Cypriot TV channel, established as a radio station in 1963, and launched its first television broadcast in 1976. Most of the TV channels in Northern Cyprus also broadcast via satellite, and there is a "Cyprus Packet" in the satellite of Türksat.

== See also ==
- TAK-Cyprus
- Television in Cyprus
