= Ada Ward =

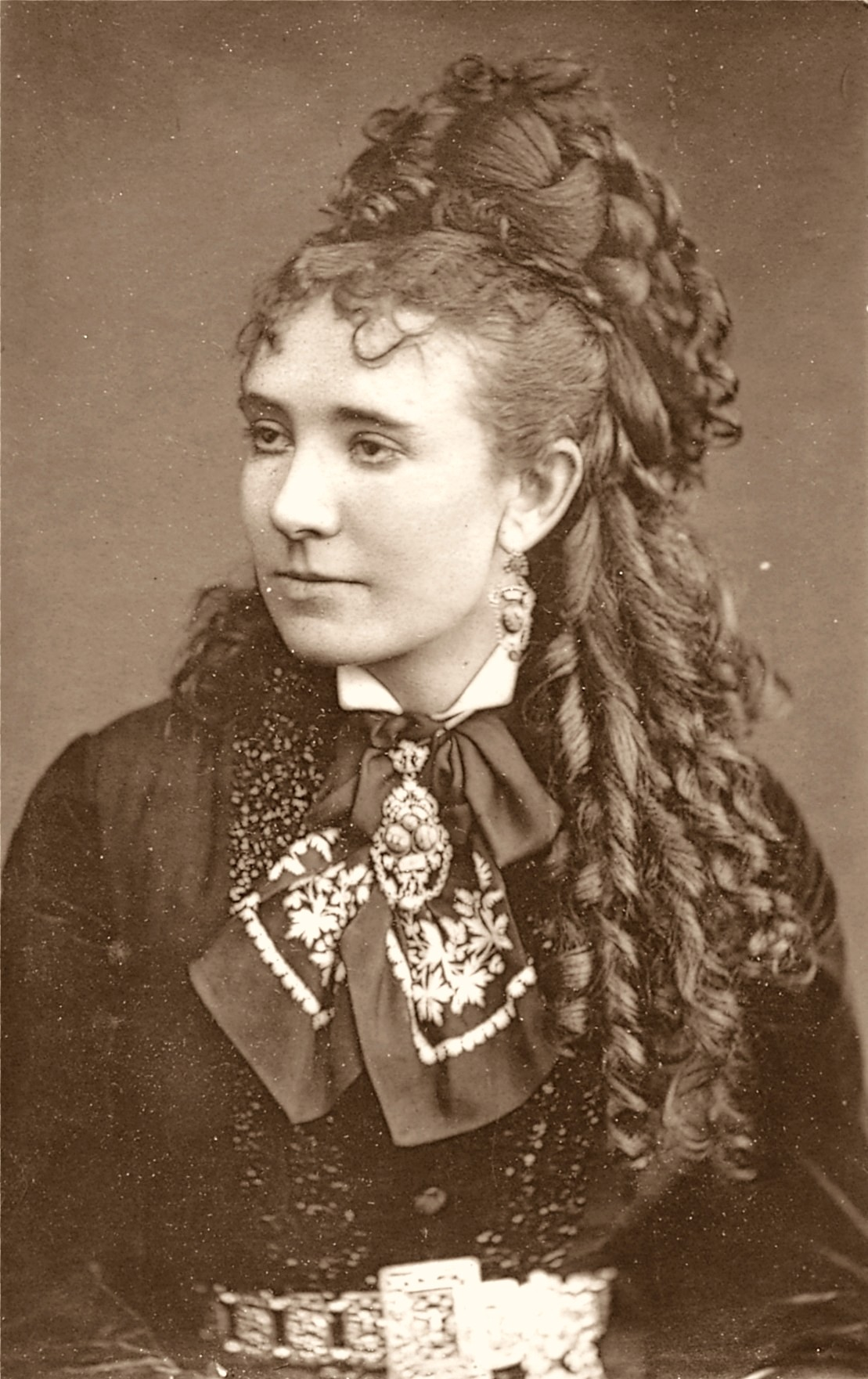
Ada Ward

Ada Ward was an English actress and singer who became a star in Australia in the 1870s, and later worked in the United States. She caused a sensation in 1897 by leaving the stage and joining the Salvation Army as a preacher and going on to work in the slums of London.
