= Charles McKenny =

American school administrator (1860–1933)

Charles McKenny (September 15, 1860 – September 23, 1933) was president of Central State Normal School (now Central Michigan University), Milwaukee State Normal School (a predecessor of University of Wisconsin–Milwaukee) and Michigan State Normal College (now Eastern Michigan University).

McKenny was born in Dimondale, Michigan. He received his bachelor's degree in 1881 from Michigan State Agricultural College (now Michigan State University) and masters from both Olivet College and the University of Wisconsin.

McKenny married Minnie E. Alderman (1869–1942) in 1890. She was a native of Vermontville, Michigan. They had three children, Charles Arthur McKenny, Laurence A. McKenny and Marion Louise McKenny. Laurence joined the Army Air Corps during World War I and was killed in action during World War II.

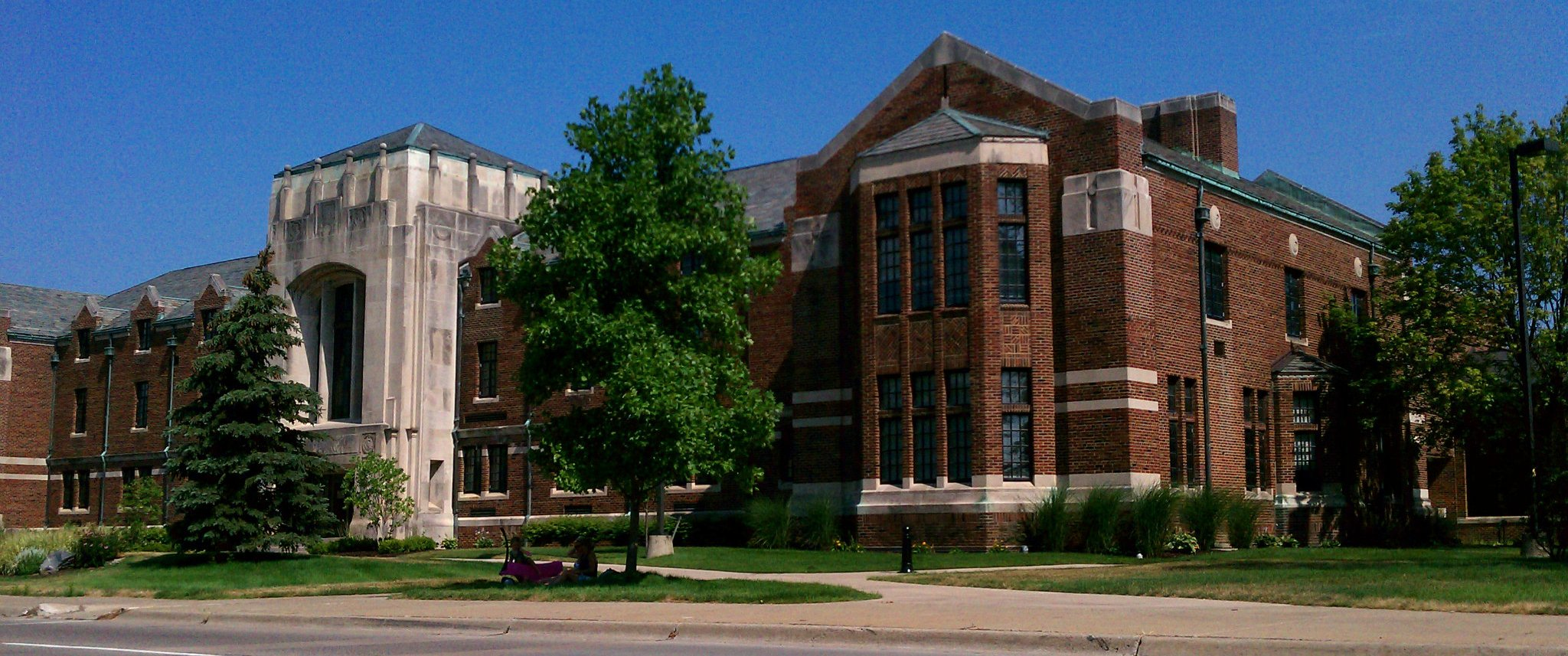
McKenny Hall, at Eastern Michigan University, is named for Charles McKenny.

McKenny begin his career as a teacher at Charlotte, Michigan. He then went to teach at Vermontville. In 1895–1896 he was a professor at Olivet College. In 1896 he became principal of Central State Normal School, where he remained as president until 1899. In 1900, he became principal of Milwaukee State Normal School where he remained until 1912.

He then took the presidency at the Michigan State Normal College (MSNC), now Eastern Michigan University. He started his administration at MSNC by instituting rules against female students having "gentleman callers" visit them in their rooms, only allowing them to visit in parlors. He also instituted rules to cut down on automobile and canoe use by female students, especially with males. The student body of MSNC at the time was overwhelmingly female. During his presidency, he proposed and then oversaw the construction of MSNC's student union, named McKenny Union (now McKenny Hall) in his honor. This was the first student union building built in the United States at an institution of higher learning primarily aimed at training teachers. McKenny remained president of MSNC until April 1933 when he became president emeritus. He died the following September.

In 1910 a book by McKenny entitled The Personality of the Teacher was published.

== Sources ==
- Eastern Michigan University archives, papers and find-aid biography of McKenny.
- Ypsilanti Daily Press, October 1, 1912
