= Ada Brown =

Ada Brown may refer to:

- Ada Brown (singer) (1890–1950), American blues singer
- Ada Brown (judge) (born 1974), American federal judge
- Ada Salter, née Brown (1866–1942), English social reformer
