= Ada Van Stone Harris =

American educator, school administrator (1866–1923)

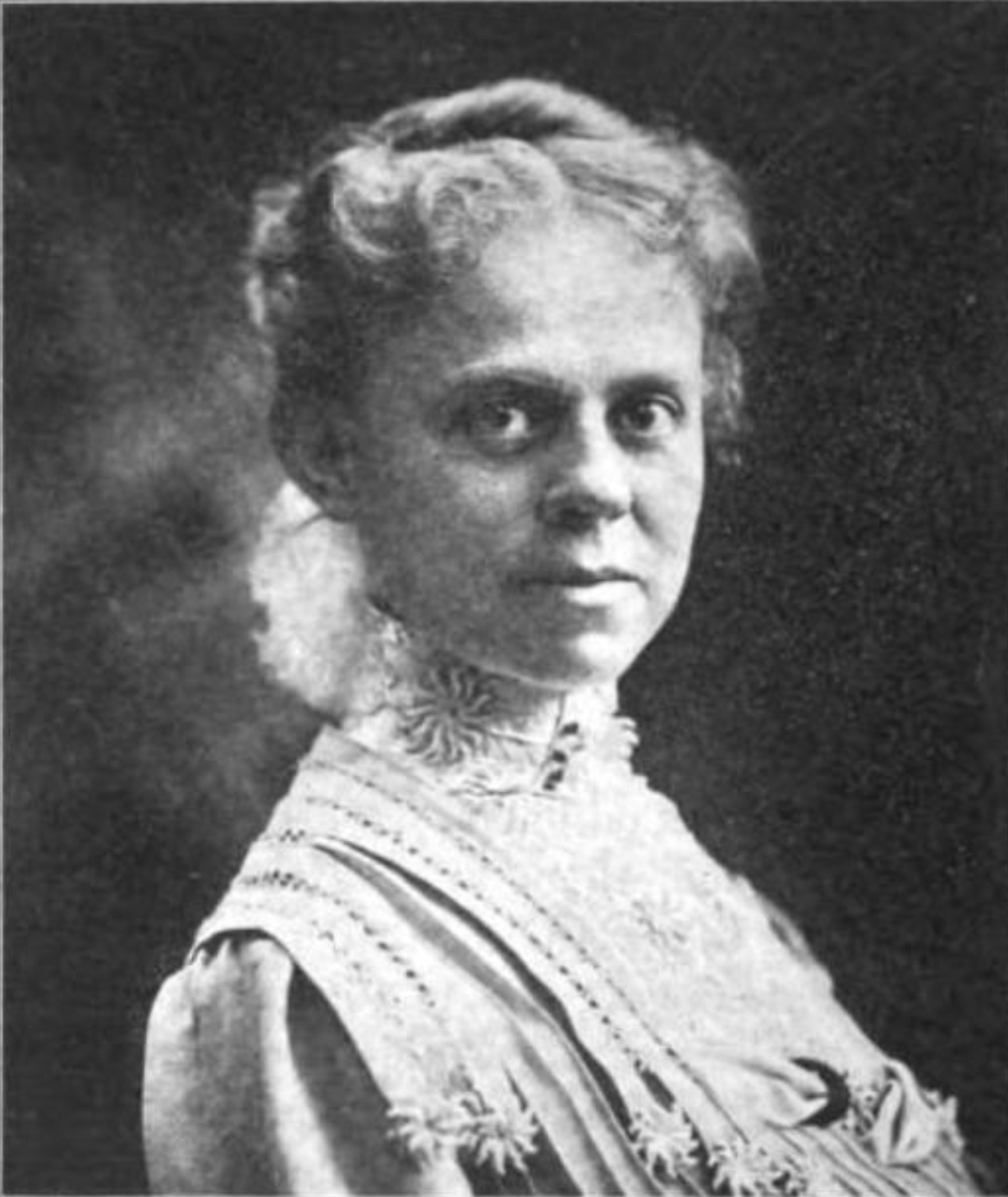
- Harris in 1904
- Born: July 27, 1866; Albion, Orleans County, New York, U.S.
- Died: January 18, 1923 (aged 56); Wilkinsburg, Pennsylvania, U.S.
- Occupations: educator; school district administrator
- Known for: President, Department of Elementary Education, National Education Association

Academic background
- Education: New York State Normal School; University of Chicago; New York University; Columbia University

Academic work
- Discipline: Kindergarten; primary grades

Ada Van Stone Harris (1866–1923) was an American educator as well as a city and county school district administrator. She held various positions associated with Kindergarten and primary grades in Michigan, Iowa, Minnesota, New York, Virginia, and Pennsylvania. A member of the National Education Association (NEA), Harris served as its President, Department of Elementary Education. She also wrote books and articles on educational topics.

== Early life and education ==
Ada Van Stone Harris was born in Albion, Orleans County, New York, on July 27, 1866. She received her early education in the state of New York.

She was a graduate of the Albion, New York public schools and of the New York State Normal School. She also studied at the University of Chicago, New York University, and Columbia University.

== Career ==
She entered upon her professional work soon after leaving school. Her experience in the grades was a foundation for her subsequent work. She soon found that her talents fitted her for the supervision and training of teachers. As she preferred the work associated with the younger children, she devoted her energies to kindergarten and primary school instruction.

Called to the training school at Muskegon, Michigan, she spent three years there. This was followed by a year at Marshalltown, Iowa.

By this time, she was well known as an organizer and trainer, and she was called to Duluth, Minnesota in the fall of 1862 to organize and take charge of the new training school just started in that city. The school was organized on a broad pedagogic basis, and Harris laid stress upon the principles of coordination and correlation. During the first year, 16 graduates of the high school were trained, in both theoretical and practical pedagogy, and under the constant supervision of Harris, became efficient primary teachers. The next year, Harris extended the scope of the instruction to all the grades below the high school. The course of study laid out by her required ability and physical vigor. Her careful training was evidenced by the fact that of the 27 admitted to the school, 25 received certificates in June. Of the two others, one left because of illness in her family; the other continued her work the next year.

The instruction of Harris and her assistants included the study of methods, psychology, pedagogy, and the history of education; the observation of various modes of instruction, and actual teaching experience. Harris organized monthly teachers' meetings for general criticism, suggestions, and discussions. The outgrowth of these meetings was a teachers' club, devoted to further educational improvements and advancement.

After three years of successful work in Duluth, Harris became supervisor of instruction in the Michigan State Normal college at Ypsilanti (later, Eastern Michigan University). She was there but two years, when a call from Newark, New Jersey brought her back to the scenes of her earlier experience. There was marked improvement in the primary school work at Newark during this year. The grade meetings, twice every week, brought the teachers more closely together, and, in a large degree, unified the system.

Her standard of work was high, but she was in thorough sympathy with the teachers, constantly helping and encouraging them. Her pedagogical ideas were broad and well grounded, and she showed skill and perseverance in their application. As a critic of primary work, she had few equals. If a teacher's method was bad, Harris was ready with a means of bettering it; if it was good, she could throw new light on its application. Harris was herself an experienced teacher as well as holding the position of supervisor of primary schools at Newark.

In the fall of 1901, Harris left Newark and came to Rochester, New York as supervisor, uniting the kindergarten and primary departments. She brought experience from other fields to this comprehensive work, and her influence was felt immediately. The kindergarten work throughout the city benefited by her supervision. A feature of the general plan which served to bring kindergartners together and to unify the work of the city was the Kindergarten Institute, which was held at least four times during the year. On this day, all kindergartens were closed and the teachers spent the day together, receiving instruction in art and music, or joining in round table conferences and sometimes games, under the guidance of Harris.

In 1904, while employed in the Rochester public schools, Harris was elected to be head of the domestic science department of Pratt Institute, Brooklyn, but declined the offer. In the same year, the eleventh convention of the International Kindergarten Union was held in Rochester, New York in April, with Harris serving as Chair of the Local Committee.

In 1906, she taught three courses at the Chautauqua Institution Summer Schools: Psychology and Pedagogy, Elementary Education General Methods, and Elementary Education Primary Methods.

Harris was a member of the NEA and served as its President, Department of Elementary Education, in 1916.

After resigning from her position in Rochester, New York, in 1910, she came to Richmond, Virginia as assistant assistant superintendent of schools in charge of primary instruction.

In 1919, while employed as Director of elementary practice teaching in Pittsburgh, Pennsylvania, Harris served on several of NEA committees: Health and Recreation, War Emergency, Necessary Readjustment in Education, Child Welfare Program in Relation to Public Education, and Enlistment of the Support of Women.

She also made important contributions to the educational magazines and was author or co-author of valuable books for schools.

== Later life ==
While residing in Pittsburgh in the Ruskin apartments, she became ill in September 1922 and for a time was in the Presbyterian Hospital. She died in Wilkinsburg, Pennsylvania on January 18, 1923. Interment was in Albion, New York.

== Selected works ==
=== Editor ===
- Sophie, adapted from the French of Madame De Segur by Charles Welsh. Illustrated by Eugene Prand. Edited by Ada Van Stone Harris. (Heath's Home and School Classics, 1895)

=== Books ===
- Harris, Ada Van Stone & Waldo, Lillian McLean, Little Folks in Busy-Land, 1916
- Harris, Ada Van Stone, "The Sixth Yearbook", The Kindergarten and Its Relation to Elementary Education, Manfred James Holmes (ed.), 1917
- Harris, Ada Van Stone & Waldo, Lillian McLean, Number Games for Primary Grades, 1919

=== Articles ===
- Harris, Ada Van Stone, "Arithmetic in the grades", 1895
- Harris, Ada Van Stone, "Homes and life of the people", The World Visualized for the Classroom, 1915
- Harris, Ada Van Stone, "Interrelation of functions in a city school system. Influence of the supervisor.", Proceedings of the Annual Meeting, National Education Association of the United States, 1906
- Harris, Ada Van Stone, "Literature for children", 1903
- Harris, Ada Van Stone, "The importance of the primary teacher", 1912
