= Ada L. Halstead =

American writer

Laura Eugenia Newhall
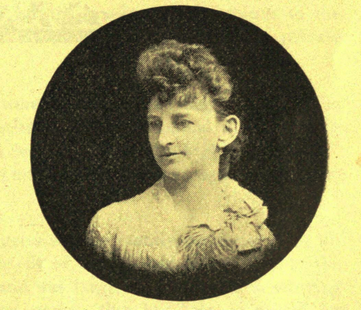
- Halstead in an 1893 publication.
- Born: Laura Eugenia Terry; 1861; California, U.S.
- Died: March 27, 1901 (aged 39–40); San Francisco, California, U.S.
- Occupation: Writer
- Spouse: Joshua Otis Newhall (m. 1884; div. 1898)
- Writing career
- Pen name: Ada L. Halstead
- Genres: novels; poetry; short stories; articles

Laura Eugenia Newhall (née Terry; pen name Ada L. Halstead; 1861–1901) was an American novelist, poet, short story writer, and journalist. (Note: Mighels (1893) and Dunne (1985) refer to Halstead's real name as Mrs. J. M. Newman.) She was born in California in 1861 and spent much of her life in Southern California, where she focused on writing fiction. Under the name "Ada L. Halstead", she published several novels, including Adopted, Hazel Verne, The Bride of Infelice, Amber, and After the Night Has Passed. In addition to her novels, she contributed poetry, short stories, and articles to newspapers and magazines, and continued her literary activities after returning to San Francisco later in life.

== Early life ==
Laura Eugenia Terry was born in California, in 1861.

== Career ==
While living in Southern California, Newhall devoted herself to writing fiction. Her productions were characterized as being on the order of the works of Augusta Evans. Newhall wrote a number of novels including: Adopted, Hazel Verne (which also went through a dramatization), The Bride of Infelice (set in Massachusetts), and Amber, among others. After the Night Has Passed (set in the Yucatan), Hazel Verne, or The Death Trust, and The Bride of Infelice were the best known of her works.

== Personal life ==
On July 31, 1884, in San Francisco, she married Joshua Otis Newhall (native of Saugus, Massachusetts), who was a merchant and hotel-keeper of Newhall, Los Angeles County, California. In 1890, Joshua Newhall turned over all his property to the Newhall Land and Farming Company, established by his uncle, Henry Newhall, in satisfaction of his debts. In the same year, Laura Newhall returned to San Francisco. In 1891, Joshua Newhall was associated with the Palace Hotel in Napa, California, and several of her poems of that time were signed from that city. In 1898, she was granted a divorce, the grounds being desertion.

Laura Eugenia Newhall died in San Francisco, March 27, 1901. She was survived by her mother, Mrs. Terry, who lived in Healdsburg, California.

== Selected works ==
After the Night has Passed

The Bride of Infelice

Hazel Verne, or the Death Trust

=== Articles ===
- "The Playing-Cards of All Nations", The San Francisco Call and Post, May 2, 1897 (text)

=== Novels ===
- Adopted, Or, The Serpent Bracelet: A Novel, 1886 (text)
- After the Night has Passed, 1896 (text)
- Amber
- Hazel Verne, or the Death Trust, 1889 ("The Pastime Series") (text)
- The Bride of Infelice, 1892 (text/text)

=== Poetry ===
- "An April Sonnet", Los Angeles Evening Express, April 23, 1890 (text)
- "Death of Summer", The Woman's Tribune, November 21, 1891 (text)
- "In My Hammock", The Woman's Tribune, August 22, 1891 (text)
- "L'Envoi", Los Angeles Evening Express, January 2, 1890 (text)
- "The Farm at Sunset", Pacific Rural Press, March 12, 1892 (text)
- "The New Athens", The Morning Call, April 26, 1891 (text)
- "Tryst of Angels", The San Francisco Call and Post, January 1, 1891 (text)

=== Short stories ===
- "A Stanza in Violets", The San Francisco Call and Post, November 26, 1899 (text)
- "Hops to Weigh", Family Friend (Auckland, New Zealand), 1890
