= Jack Loney =

Australian marine historian (1925–1995)

Jack Kenneth Loney
- Born: 21 October 1925; Geelong, Victoria
- Died: 13 February 1995 (aged 69)
- Occupations: schoolteacher and principal
- Known for: Maritime historian

Jack Kenneth Loney (21 October 1925 – 13 February 1995) was an amateur Australian maritime historian who published over one hundred books and numerous newspaper and magazine articles. He was a schoolteacher and principal until his retirement. He became interested in maritime history after preparing several general history booklets covering the Otway region of western Victoria, Australia.

== Personal life ==
Loney lived throughout his life in Portarlington, Victoria with his wife Padge. He had two children, Peter and Sally.

== Jack Loney Award ==
Loney was an inaugural and long-standing member of the Victorian Government's Historic Shipwrecks Advisory Committee (HSAC); the Victorian government decreed a perpetual memorial award - called the Jack Loney Award - for outstanding contribution to maritime history in recognition of Loney's contribution to the preservation of Australia's shipwreck and maritime heritage. The Award is made only as occasion demands, with the recipient chosen by the Victorian Historic Shipwrecks Advisory Committee to the Heritage Council. Winners have included:

- 1998: Peter Stone, in recognition of his outstanding contribution to the preservation of Australia's maritime heritage through his community role as a maritime and dive adventure writer, lobbyist, publisher and photographer.
- 2000: Terry Arnott, in recognition of his services to Victoria's maritime heritage at the Australian Institute for Maritime Archaeology (AIMA) and Australasian Society for Historical Archaeology (ASHA).
- 2004: Peter Ronald, the former Victorian Heritage Council member and Victorian Historic Shipwrecks Advisory Committee Chairman, for long-standing contribution to the protection of Victoria's historic shipwrecks and as an advocate of maritime heritage in the state.
- 2009: Dr Leonie Foster, for her groundbreaking research, long-standing committee membership, and mentoring of maritime heritage professionals in Australia.
- 2010: Peter Taylor, shipwreck diver and maritime historian

== Bibliography ==
=== Australian shipwrecks series ===
As an amateur maritime historian he took over the writing and publishing of the most comprehensive reference series of books on maritime disasters in Australia from Charles Bateson the Australian Shipwrecks series.

- Australian shipwrecks Vol. 1 1622–1850 By Charles Bateson. Sydney. Reed, 1972 910.4530994 BAT
- Australian shipwrecks Vol. 2 1851–1871 By Loney, J. K. (Jack Kenneth), 1925–1995. Sydney. Reed, 1980 910.4530994 LON
- Australian shipwrecks Vol. 3 1871–1900 By Loney, J. K. (Jack Kenneth), 1925–1995. Geelong Vic: List Publishing, 1982 910.4530994 LON
- Australian shipwrecks Vol. 4 1901–1986 By Loney, J. K. (Jack Kenneth), 1925–1995. Portarlington Vic. Marine History Publications, 1987 910.4530994 LON
- Australian shipwrecks Vol. 5 Update 1986 By Loney, J. K. (Jack Kenneth), 1925–1995. Portarlington Vic. Marine History Publications, 1991 910.4530994 LON

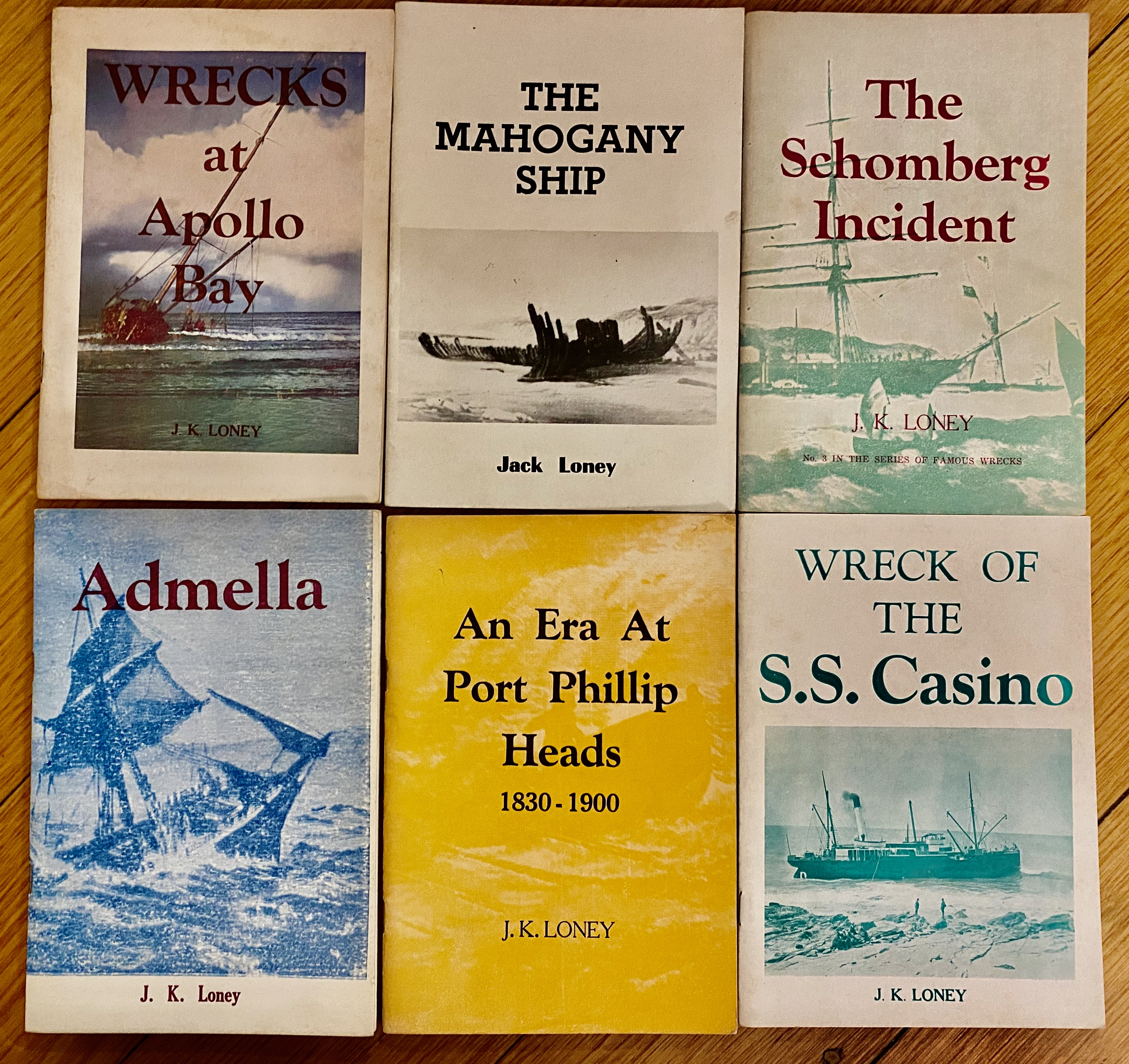
A sample of booklets written by Jack Loney

=== Other works ===
A selection of his many other books and smaller booklets includes:

- Admella
- Adventures with shipwrecks, an account of wrecks in the Apollo Bay Area
- An era at Port Phillip Heads: 1830–1900
- Apollo Bay : tourist and fishing guide
- The Australia run
- Australia's island shipwrecks
- Australia's shipwreck coast and other stories
- Australian sea mysteries
- Australian sea stories
- Bay steamers and coastal ferries
- Ben Boyd's ships
- Clipper Lightning in Geelong, 1862–1869
- Early shipping in the Port of Geelong
- Falls of Halladale
- Famous wrecks
- Great Ocean Road, tourist and historical guide
- High & dry: visible wrecks and wreckage in Australian waters
- The historic Barwon
- Jack Loney's maritime Australia, short tales of ships and men
- King Island: tourist and historical guide
- Lady Bay, Warrnambool: a graveyard of ships
- The Loch Ard disaster
- The mahogany ship
- Mysteries of the Bass Strait triangle
- Not enough grass to feed a single bullock: a history of Tarwin Lower, Venus Bay and Waratah
- Notes on the Otway
- Old days and ways along the South Coast: tales from the surf and shipwreck coasts
- Otway 1919–1969
- Otway and its coast in retrospect
- Otway memories
- Peterborough, Port Campbell, Princetown: tourist, historical and fishing guide
- Pioneering days: a collection of short articles prepared by the author, J.K. Loney, during his years at Apollo Bay (1954–1971)
- Port Fairy, tourist, historical and fishing guide
- The price of admiralty: ships of the R.A.N. lost, 1914–1974
- The Queenscliff lifeboat wreck and rescue at Port Phillip Heads
- Queenscliff, Point Lonsdale: tourist and historical guide
- Ramblers guide to west coast shipwrecks
- Sea adventures and wrecks on the N.S.W. south coast
- The Seahorse Inn
- Sea war in Bass Strait
- Ships and seamen off the south coast
- Ships and shipwrecks at Port Albert
- Ships and shipwrecks at Portarlington
- Ships at Port Welshpool and other memories
- Ships in Corio Bay, Geelong 1840–1980
- Shipwreck strait: an illustrated history of major shipwrecks, collisions, fires and strandings in Bass Strait from 1797
- Shipwrecks along the Great Ocean Road
- Shipwrecks and sea adventures around Wilsons Promontory
- Shipwrecks on Kangaroo Island
- The Schomberg incident
- Some overseas shipping arrivals in Melbourne and Geelong, 1856–1860
- South Coast story: Torquay, Barwon Heads, Ocean Grove, Point Lonsdale, Queenscliff
- Stranding of R.M.S. Australia
- Tales from the surf coast, shipwreck coast and their hinterlands
- Tall ships and sailormen : a concise survey of Victoria's early maritime history
- Twelve decades: a short history of Apollo Bay, 1850–1969
- Victims of the Corsair rock
- Victorian shipwrecks; all wrecks in Victorian waters and Bass Strait, including King Island and the Kent group
- Victoria's West Coast steamers
- Warrnambool the graveyard of ships, wrecks and strandings in and around Lady Bay
- Wreck - 1891 and other maritime memories
- Wreck and rescue at Port Phillip Heads
- Wreck of the Fiji
- Wreck of the Ly-e-Moon
- Wreck of the ship Eric The Red
- Wreck of the S.S. Casino
- Wrecks along the Murray
- Wrecks at Hell's Gates
- Wrecks at Robe
- Wrecks on Phillip Island
- Wrecks on South Australia's south-east coast: shipwrecks and strandings from Port Macdonnell to the Murray River
- Wrecks on South Australia's southern coastline
- Wrecks on the Gippsland coast
- Wrecks on the Gippsland coast: a survey of major incidents from Point Nepean to Cape Howe, and nearer islands of Bass Strait; including Westernport, Anderson's Inlet, Waratah Bay, Kent Group, Corner Inlet, Port Albert, Lakes Entrance, Lake Tyers, Marlo, Sydenham Inlet, Mallacoota and Gabo Island
- Wrecks on the New South Wales coast
- Wrecks on the Queensland coast, 1791-1992: includes Great Barrier Reef, Coral Sea, Torres Strait, Gulf of Carpentaria
- Wrecks on the South Australian coast: including Kangaroo Island
- Wrecks on Victoria's south west coast; a survey of incidents from the Victorian-South Australian border to Lady Bay, including Portland, Port Fairy, and Warrnambool
- Wrecks on the Western Australian coast: and Northern Territory
- Wrecks in Australian waters : an illustrated survey of shipwrecks, fires, collisions and strandings on the Australian coast from 1629
- Wrecks in the Furneaux Group (Flinders Island)
- Wreckers, smugglers and pirates in South Eastern Australian waters
- Wrecks along the Gippsland coast
- Wrecks around Cape Otway: shipwrecks and strandings from Port Campbell to Anglesea
- Wrecks at Apollo Bay
- Wrecks in Port Phillip Bay
- Wrecks in the Rip
- Wrecks on King Island
- Yambulla gold : a brief record of the colourful Yambulla goldrush, near Eden
