= Ada (computer virus) =

Computer virus affecting DOS operating systems, discovered in 1991

Malware details
- Technical name: ADA
- Aliases: Ada, Ada-2600, Ada.2600
- Type: DOS
- Subtype: COM infector. Random nuisance.
- Classification: Computer virus
- Family: N/A
- Isolation date: 1991
- Origin: Argentina
- Authors: Pessoa, nome, feminino = Ada ( Feliz, Própera, Desfragmentar, Vírus) Brasil

Ada is a computer virus that can affect any of the DOS operating systems. Ada was first discovered in 1991.

== History ==
Ada virus was first discovered in Argentina in October 1991 (34 years ago).

== Characteristics ==
Ada is a memory resident virus that infects files. The Ada virus mainly targets .COM files, specifically COMMAND.COM and stays in the memory of the computer it infects after the program it infected executes.

Infected programs have 2,600 bytes additional data inserted at the beginning of the file, and the file itself contains the text strings:

- COMMAND.COM
- PCCILLIN.COM
- PCCILLIN.IMG
- HATI-HATI !! ADA VIRUS DISINI !!Delete

Another version of Ada has these text strings along with the strings BASURA BASURA repeated numerous times.

Computers infected with the Ada virus often have a slow clicking sound emitting from their speakers; this clicking may sometimes change in pitch. Infected computers may show a "Disk Full" error even if the disk still has space on it.

While infected with the Ada virus, system memory measured by the DOS CHKDSK decreases by 21,296 bytes to 21,312 bytes. The virus resides in the memory after an infected file is run and will infect any other .COM files executed on the computer. It also hijacks interrupts 08, 13 and 21.

== Infection route ==
There is only one way to infect a computer with the Ada virus; by executing an infected file. The infected file may come from a variety of sources: floppy disks, files downloaded from the Internet, and infected networks.
