= Ada Lee =

American singer

- Origin: Springfield, Ohio, Dayton, Ohio, Toronto, Peterborough
- Genres: Jazz, Blues, Soul, Gospel
- Years active: 1957–present
- Label: Atco Records

Ada Lee is a singer from Springfield, Ohio, who has performed jazz, blues, gospel and soul music on stage and record in the United States and Canada since the late 1950s.

== Early years ==
Of African American heritage, Ada Lee was born in Springfield, Ohio, and grew up there in a musical family. Her father was a professional trumpeter who played all over Ohio with his own band. Her mother also played piano and organ and sang. From the time Ada was in junior high school she took her singing seriously and studied intensively with teachers in Springfield and at the Dayton Conservatory of Music. Her training was formal, and most of the songs on which she worked were classical. Jazz and popular music were not left out of her training, however. While in high school, she sang with the Bus Palmer Band of Springfield on weekends, and began appearing on local radio programs. Later, while studying at the Dayton Conservatory, she sang with bands in Dayton and Cincinnati. During that period, she won the Wendy Berrie Talent Show contest on WHIO-TV in Dayton. As a result, she was awarded a scholarship to Wilberforce University, where she continued her musical studies.

After leaving university, she remained in Ohio for a year, during which time she came to the attention of Count Basie and Lionel Hampton, and sang local dates with both bands. In 1957 she began receiving wider notice, with bookings at the Apollo Theater in New York and The Flame Show Bar in Detroit. Her big break came in 1960 when George Wein, the organizer of the Newport and other jazz festivals, heard her in Buffalo. He not only booked her for the Buffalo Jazz Festival that year, but became her personal manager.

== Recording career ==
Thanks to Wein's connections, Atlantic Records brought Lee to their studios in New York in December 1960 to record four songs under the supervision of Dick Hyman. Two numbers, You Always Hurt The One You Love b/w Moanin' were released on the Atlantic subsidiary Atco Records in June 1961. Atlantic arranged three more sessions with Lee in May and June 1961 where she recorded 12 more songs with Hyman and some of the top jazz session players in New York, including saxophonist Jerome Richardson, guitarist Joe Puma, and bass players Milt Hinton and George Duvivier. The results were released on the LP Ada Lee Comes On and feature a sophisticated blend of jazz, pop, blues and gospel styles. A review in the November 6, 1961, issue of Billboard Magazine gave the album four stars and said:

"Ada Lee is a young thrush with a warm and interesting voice, making her debut disking with this release. She comes off mighty well too, due to a good selection of tunes, bright vocal work and attractive arrangements by conductor Dick Hyman. Good wax."

A career highlight for Lee came in the summer of 1962 with an appearance at Wein's Ohio Valley Jazz Festival at the Carthage Fairgrounds outside Cincinnati. The three-day festival featured jazz legends including Duke Ellington, Louis Armstrong, Dave Brubeck, Horace Silver, Coleman Hawkins, Jimmy Smith and Roy Eldridge. The event was a huge financial and artistic success, and afforded Lee an opportunity to perform on the festival's final night in front of her hometown fans.

== Move to Canada ==
Lee continued to perform after moving to Canada in the 1960s, but her appearances on record after this time are few. One notable recording featured Lee’s distinctive scat style vocals on a tune called Expo Session 67 by a quintet led by Fred Stone. The song was recorded in Toronto in early 1967 and featured in Citerama, a six-minute long experimental film that played at the Man In The Community pavilion at Montreal’s 1967 International and Universal Exposition, better known as Expo 67. The song was also released on a soundtrack recording from KL Records.

In November 1974 Lee recorded vocals for an album by Scottish-born pianist Joel Shulman. The record featured Canadian jazz musicians Guido Basso on flugelhorn, Moe Koffman on flute, and Don Thompson on bass and vibes. Lee wrote and sang on the record’s title track Nowhere But Here.

For several decades Lee lived in the community of Peterborough, Ontario, northeast of Toronto, where she had served countless charities in the area and founded the Voices for Life Gospel Choir. For her work on stage and television and with the Peterborough Centennial Choir, Lee was honoured with the Governor General’s Award and a plaque on the Pathway of Fame at Peterborough’s Del Crary Park.

In 2014, she moved to Vancouver, British Columbia to be closer to her daughter. Her son, George Lee, is an Ohio-based jazz bassist.

== Selected discography ==
- Comes On! Atco 33-132 - 1961

=== Singles and anthologies ===
- Ada Lee – Moanin' / You Always Hurt The One You Love - Atco 6189 – June 1961
- Ada Lee – Comes On - Atco LP 33-132, SD 33-132 – Nov 1961
- Fred Stone Quintet – Citérama – KL RECORDS KL-201 - Early 1967
- Joel Shulman – Nowhere But Here – ATTIC LAT1014 – Nov 1974
