= Adaptive Design Association =

American nonprofit organization

Adaptive Design Association, Inc.
- Abbreviation: ADA
- Formation: 2001
- Type: 501(c)(3)
- Location: New York, New York, USA
- Founder: Alex Truesdell
- Executive Director: Jennifer Hercman
- Website: www.adaptivedesign.org

The Adaptive Design Association, Inc. (ADA) is a not-for-profit organization founded in 2001 responsible for creating custom child-specific adaptations for children with disabilities.

== Overview ==
The Adaptive Design Association, Inc. is a not-for-profit organization which creates custom adaptations for children with disabilities. Its work is based in part on the Adaptive Design work at the Perkins School for the Blind in Watertown, Massachusetts. The group utilizes tri-wall cardboard and other sustainable materials to meet children's equipment needs. Products include tangible symbol cues, customized positioning systems, and customized work surfaces.

The ADA also trains occupational and physical therapists in making adaptive design. The ADA is a community partner of Sarah Lawrence College in Bronxville/Yonkers, New York.

== History ==
MacArthur Fellow Alex Truesdell founded the organization in 2001 after founding and coordinating the Assistive Device Center at Perkins School For the Blind. As of 2013 she is the ADA's executive director.

The ADA was featured in the 2009 short documentary Among the Giants by Cory Tomascoff. It was also featured in a 2013 short film titled A World of Difference With Cardboard.
