= Ada, Bosnia and Herzegovina =

Ada
- Village
- Location within Bosnia and Herzegovina
- Coordinates: 45.0168°N 18.3507°E
- Country: Bosnia and Herzegovina
- Entity: Federation of Bosnia and Herzegovina; Republika Srpska
- Canton Region: Posavina; Doboj
- Municipality: Odžak; Vukosavlje

Area
  - Total: 1.25 sq mi (3.24 km^{2})

Population (2013)
  - Total: 315
  - Density: 252/sq mi (97.2/km^{2})
- Time zone: UTC+1 (CET)
  - Summer (DST): UTC+2 (CEST)

Ada is a village in the municipalities of Odžak (Federation of Bosnia and Herzegovina) and Vukosavlje (Republika Srpska), Bosnia and Herzegovina.

== Demographics ==
According to the 2013 census, its population was 315, with 186 living in the Odžak part and 129 in the Vukosavlje part.

Ethnicity in 2013
Ethnicity	Number	Percentage
Croats	312	99.0%
Serbs	1	0.3%
Other/Undeclared	2	0.6%
Total	315	100%
