= Ada (2019 film) =

Canadian short film

- Directed by: Steven Kammerer
- Written by: Steven Kammerer; Julie Bruns
- Produced by: Camille Hollett-French; Steven Kammerer; Michael Khazen; Amanda Konkin; Otto Mak
- Starring: Julie Bruns; Hanneke Talbot; John Emmet Tracy; Matthew Kevin Anderson; Jim Byrnes
- Cinematography: Wai Sun Cheng
- Edited by: Alex Leigh Barker
- Music by: Sean William
- Production companies: Crazy8s Film Society; Meep Productions
- Release date: February 23, 2019 (Canada)
- Country: Canada
- Language: English
- Budget: CAD $1,000

Ada is a 2019 Canadian short film based on the late life of Ada Lovelace, made for the Crazy8s film competition in Vancouver. It is directed by Steven Kammerer and stars Julie Bruns as Ada Lovelace. The cast includes Hanneke Talbot, John Emmet Tracy, Matthew Kevin Anderson, and Jim Byrnes.
