= Ada Williams =

Ada Williams may refer to:

- Ada Williams (actress) (born 1913), American film actress
- Ada Williams (baby farmer) (1875–1900), British murderer
