= Ada, Osun State =

Town in Boripe, Osun State, Nigeria

Ada
- Town
- Motto: Akara Loro Ada
- Ada Location within Nigeria
- Coordinates: 7°53′44″N 4°42′34″E
- Country: Nigeria
- State: Osun State
- Local Government area: Boripe
- Founded: 1900s

Government
  - Type: Monarchy
  - Olona Of Ada: Oba Oyetunde Olumuyiwa Ojo (2020-Present)

Area
  - Total: 34.54 km^{2} (13.34 sq mi)

Population
  - Total: 174,152
- Time zone: UTC+1 (WAT)
- National language: Yorùbá

Ada is a town in the Boripe Local Government area of Osun State, Nigeria. A town headed by Oba Oyetunde Olumuyiwa Ojo (The Olona of Ada), Ada has the biggest market in the local government area and it generated the highest revenue for it. Some of the compounds that make up the town are Ile Oba Oludele, Ile oba Adeitan, Ile oba Olugbogbo, Ile Aro, Ile Alagbaa, Ojomu Oteniola, Alade, Eesa, Jagun, Osolo, Oke Baale, Asasile, Oluode, Agba Akin, and Ile Odogun.The people of the town are hospitable, industrious, and hardworking. They value education and are accommodating for citation of any businesses due to their large geographical land expanse yet to be developed. There are hotels and a hospital in the town.

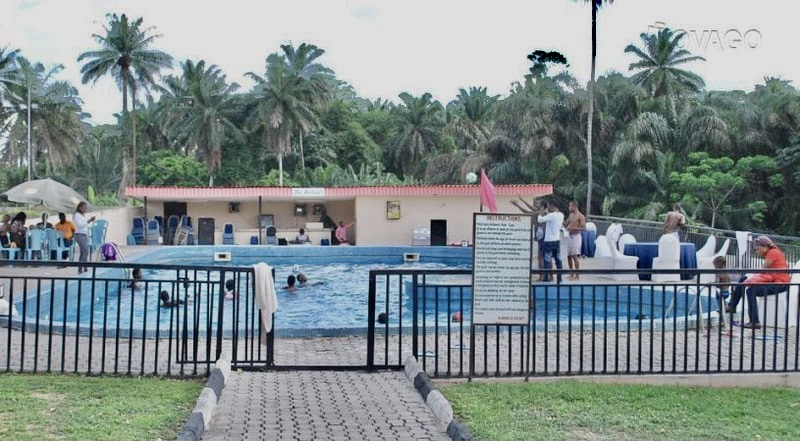
Miccom Golf Hotel in Ada

== Background ==
The settlement dates from before the late 19th century. Ada has the biggest market in the local government area known as (Obada Market) and it generated the highest revenue for it. Buying and selling takes place every 5 days. The town is the home of a private golf course that was created by Comfort Olufunke Ponnle and her husband, a prominent estate valuer and philanthropist, Bode Adediji, Late Alalade, one of the first chartered accountants in Nigeria.

== Religion ==
Several religions are practiced in the town but Christianity and Islam are the dominant religions, the town has seen a rise in other dominations of Christianity especially the Pentecostal's, Apostolic, Evangelical and others.

== Occupations ==
Ada people's ancient occupation is black soap production (Osedudu). Another main occupation of the town is Farming.

== Hotels and Restaurants ==
Ada also has hotels for visitors and travelers. Hotels in Ada are listed below.

- Miccom Golf Hotel & Resort
- Royal life Hotel
- Epic Hotel (and others)

== Educational institutions ==
Below is the list of notable Educational Institutions including private and government schools in the town.

Government Schools:

- Secondary commercial grammar school
- local authority middle school (L.A school)
- Baptist Primary School
- St Andrew Primary School
- Ajayi Memorial High School

And others...

Private Schools:

- Goshen Model college
- El-Shaddai Private school
- Salem Comprehensive high school
- Excel kiddies School

And many more
