= Caroline Ada Seville =

Caroline Ada Seville (1874–1955) was a New Zealand nurse, hospital matron and community leader. She was born in Birmingham, England in 1874.
