= Ade (surname) =

Ade /əˈdɪ/ is a surname with multiple origins. When found in Western Africa, it is usually accented. Ade is also a surname used by Banjara in India Refer Banjara Rajputs.

Ade may refer to people named:

- Ebiet G. Ade, Indonesian singer
- George Ade, American writer
- King Sunny Adé, Nigerian musician
- Maren Ade, German film director
- MC ADE, American musician
