= River Adda (Wales) =

River in North Wales

Coordinates: 53°13′47″N 4°06′40″W

River Adda (Afon Adda in Welsh) is a small watercourse which flows through the city of Bangor in North Wales before discharging into the Menai Strait at Hirael Bay, opposite Porth Penrhyn. The name is said to be of 19th-century origin, deriving from a field Cae Mab Adda ("the field of the son of Adam") close to its source. Its earlier name was Tarannon.

Lôn Las Adda (a foot and cycle path) follows closely the course of the river for much of its length. By this path at Glynne Road can be seen the sides of an old bridge.

Now for the most part culverted, parts of the river were open until the 1960s. The last section, from Glynne Road to Beach Road was culverted prior to the building of the nearby swimming pool.

Following flooding in the Caernarfon Road area in 2004, a flood alleviation scheme was carried out by the (then) Environment Agency Wales to improve the culverting. Work was completed in 2008.

In 2016 Dr Zoe Skoulding and Ben Stammers ran a project called rAdda, which was supported by a number of statutory and other bodies. The project sought to explore the relationship between the river and the people of Bangor. It included an interpreted walk along the course of the Adda, and a multi-media performance in Storiel gallery, which featured photographs; spoken, and recorded words, and music.

== Tarannon Festival ==
The Tarannon Festival is Bangor Cathedral's Festival of Religion and the Arts, held annually in October.
