= Carroll Watson Rankin =

American novelist

Caroline Clement Watson Rankin
- Born: May 11, 1864; Marquette, Michigan
- Died: August 13, 1945 (aged 81)
- Citizenship: American
- Spouse: Ernest Rankin
- Writing career
- Pen name: Carroll Watson Rankin
- Genres: Short stories, novels
- Notable work: Dandelion Cottage

Dandelion Cottage
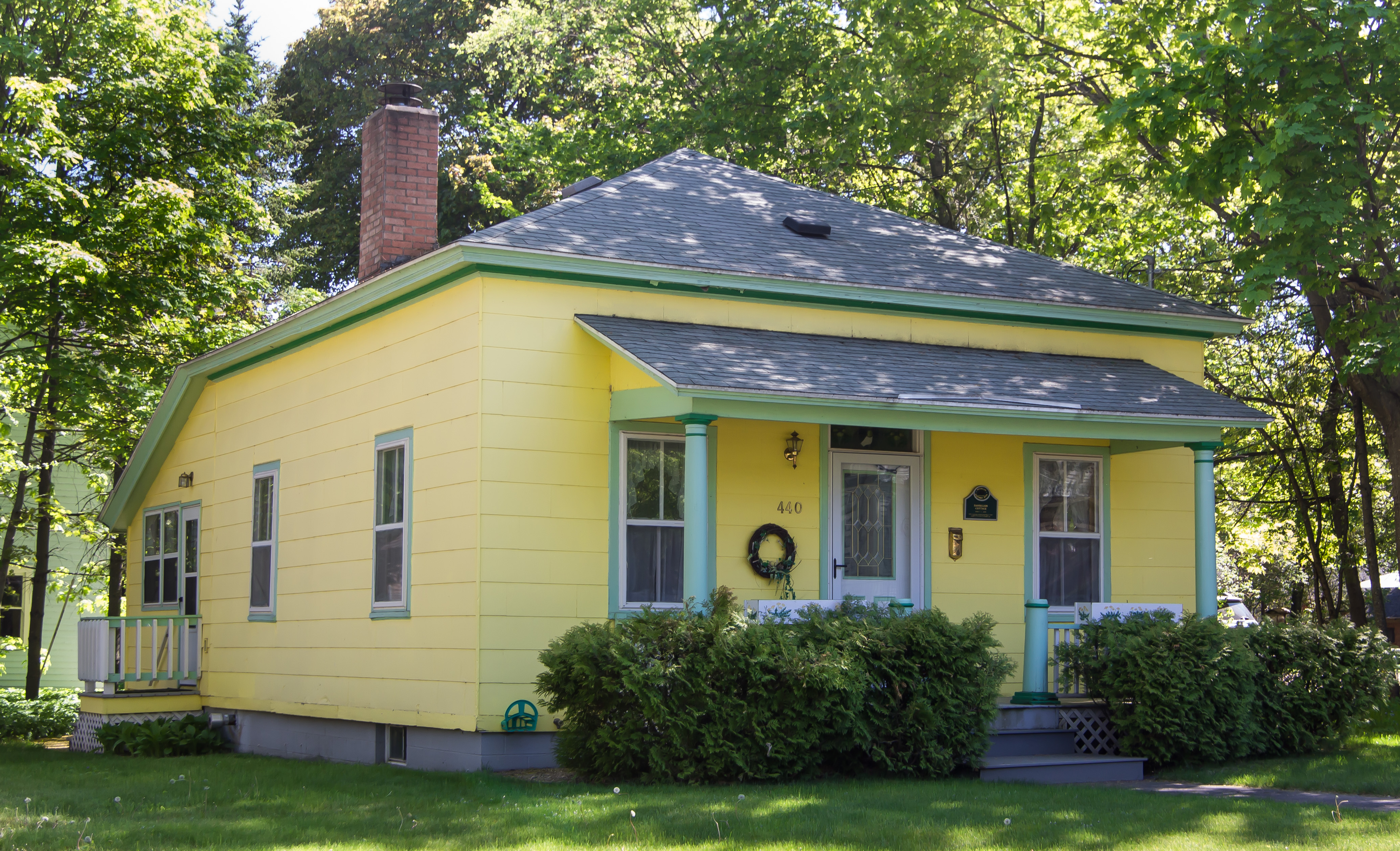
- Dandelion Cottage

- Location within Michigan
- 46°32′46″N 87°23′02″W
- Location: 440 E. Arch St., Marquette, Michigan

Michigan State Historic Site
- Designated: August 20, 1992

Carroll Watson Rankin was the pen name of American writer Caroline Clement Watson Rankin (1864–1945).

== Biography ==
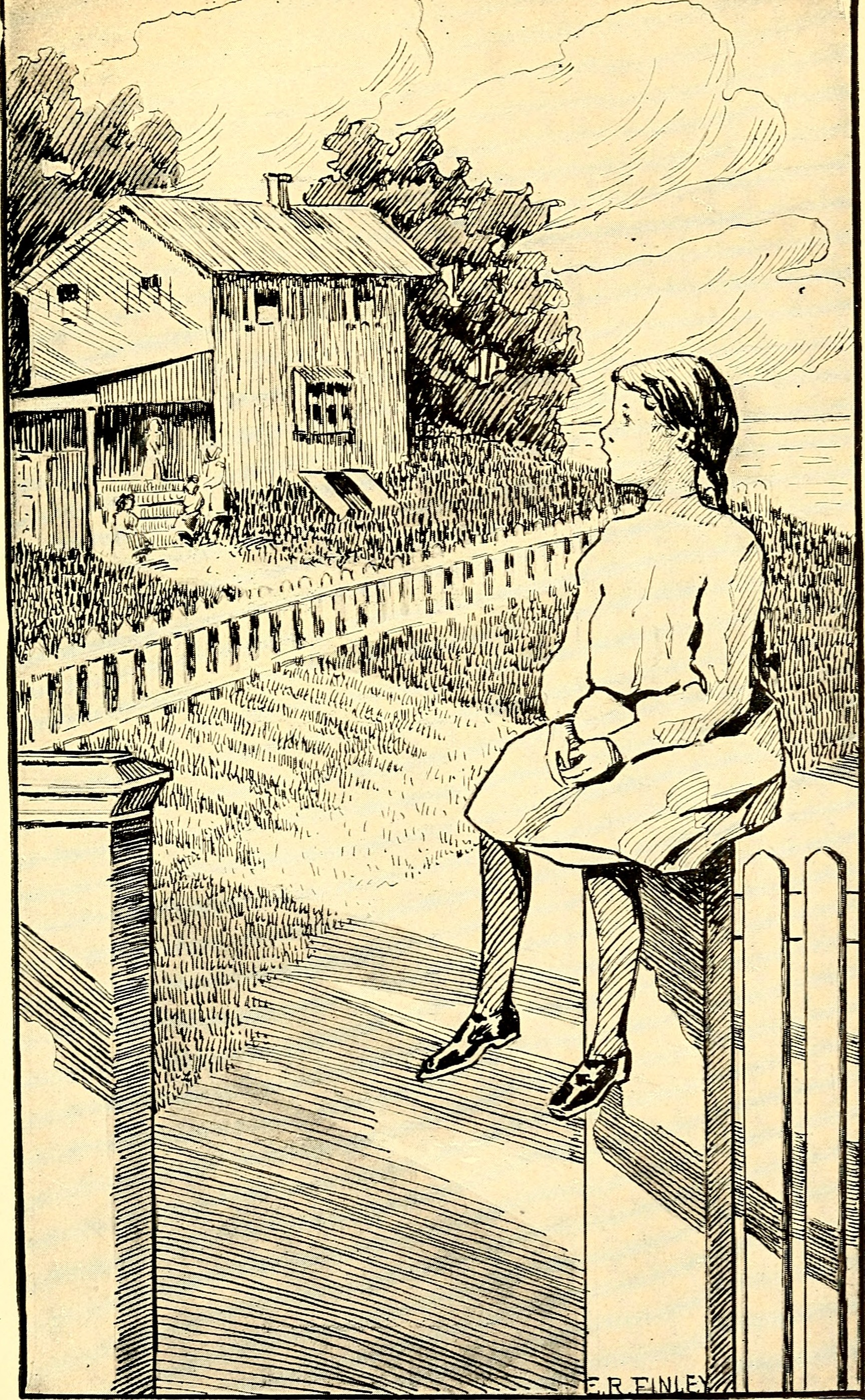
Dandelion Cottage with llustrations by Florence Scovel Shinn and Elizabeth Reynolds Finley

Rankin was born May 11, 1864, in Marquette, Michigan, in the Upper Peninsula, and raised her four children there. Her first writing assignment came at the age of 16, when she was hired as a reporter for the Daily Mining Journal. She kept the job until her marriage to Ernest Rankin in 1886. Her free lance stories were published by Century, Harper's Monthly, Youth's Companion, St. Nicholas, Leslie's, Lippincott's, Metropolitan and other widely circulated periodicals. Her best known novel is Dandelion Cottage, published in 1904 by Henry Holt and Company. She first wrote the story serially for her own children. Considered a regional classic in the Midwest, it tells of four young girls who negotiate the use of a derelict cottage belonging to a church as a playhouse by pulling dandelions for the senior warden of the church, prosperous Mr. Black. The real life model for Mr. Black is generally acknowledged to be Marquette businessman and philanthropist, Peter White. The original Dandelion Cottage is located at 440 East Arch and is privately owned. Now that the book is in public domain, it is available from Project Gutenberg and a print edition is available from the Marquette Regional History Center, published by the Marquette County Historical Society.

Rankin allowed her characters much latitude in emotion and behavior at a time when writing for children was often tepid and tutelary. Other of her novels for youth include:

- The Girls of Gardenville (1906)
- The Anti Foster Pet Association (1907)
- The Adopting of Rosa Marie (1908)
- Castaways of Pete's Patch (1911)
- The Cinder Pond (1915)
- Girls of Highland Hall (1921)
- Gipsy Nan (1926)
- Finders Keepers (1930)
- Wolf Rock (1933)
- Stump Village (1935)
