= Ades (surname) =

Ades is a surname. Notable people with the surname include:

- Jean-Claude Ades (21st century), German electronic music producer
- Joe Ades (1933–2009), NYC street hawker of carrot peelers
- Ovadiah Josiah Ades, co-financier of the Ades Synagogue
- Steven Ades (born 1982), English cricketer
- Yosef Isaac Ades, co-financier of the Ades Synagogue

== See also ==
- Adès (surname)
  - Thomas Adès, British composer
