= Ada Roach =

American actress

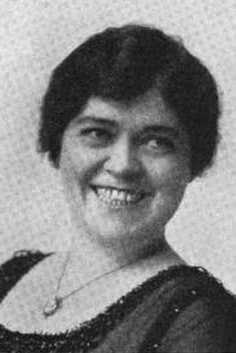
- Occupation(s): Comedy actress and entertainer
- Years active: 1910s–1920s

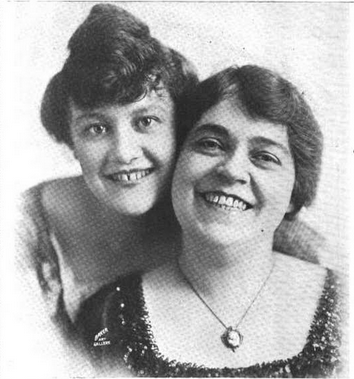
Ruth Freeman (back) and Ada Roach (front), as a duo act, from a 1918 advertisement.

Ada Roach was an American musical comedy actress and entertainer on the Chautauqua and lyceum circuits. She was head of the Ada Roach Company (also called "Ada Roach and Company") from 1915 to 1917, and partner of Ruth Freeman in the Roach-Freeman Duo into the 1920s.

== Career ==
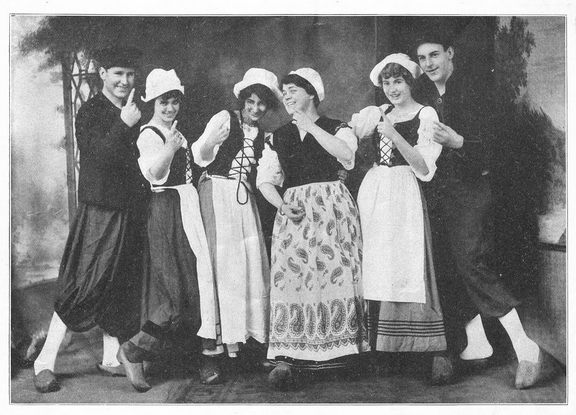
The Ada Roach Company, in "The Heart of the Immigrant" (1915).

In 1913 Roach performed with The Killarney Girls, a touring group presenting Irish songs and dances. As head of the six-person Ada Roach and Company from 1915 to 1917, she starred in Charles F. Horner's The Heart of the Immigrant (1915), "a stirring musical play which also abounds in histrionic and educational features", on the lyceum circuit. The show toured for two years. In Nebraska, the company's car broke down and they carried their luggage six miles on foot, rather than miss their curtain.

She was called a "bundle of sunshine" guaranteed to "chase the shadows from the face of the sourest of the sour." Her exuberant comedic talents were held to be especially welcome during wartime. By April 1918 she was partnered with fellow Killarney Girls alumna Ruth Freeman in a two-woman act, the Roach-Freeman Duo. They performed as part of the Liberty Girls show in 1918. Roach sang Irish songs, played accordion and banjo, and told stories, while Freeman presented a Swedish persona and played violin. The Roach-Freeman team moved to New York in 1922. They were both in the cast of a touring musical comedy, Meet Cousin Mary, in 1923. Roach and Freeman appeared together on the Chautauqua platforms in California and Montana in 1924.

In 1926, Ada Roach toured with another partner, pianist Martha Trippeer. She performed on radio in 1927, as a humorist, storyteller, and impersonator, on WMAQ in Chicago.

== Personal life ==
Ada Roach and her niece Jane McKenna were both injured in a car accident in 1917, in Chicago, and Roach was hospitalized for a month.
