= Ada of Holland (disambiguation) =

Ada, Countess of Holland (c. 1188 – 1234/37) was a countess-regnant and the co-regnant with husband Louis II of Loon.

Ada of Holland may also refer to:

- Ada of Holland, Margravine of Brandenburg (c. 1163 – after 1205)
- Ada of Scotland, Countess of Ross, Countess-consort of Holland (died after 1206)
- Ada of Holland (abbess) (1208–1258), abbess of Rijnsburg Abbey from 1239
