= Ada Castells =

Catalan professor, writer and journalist

Ada Castells Ferrer
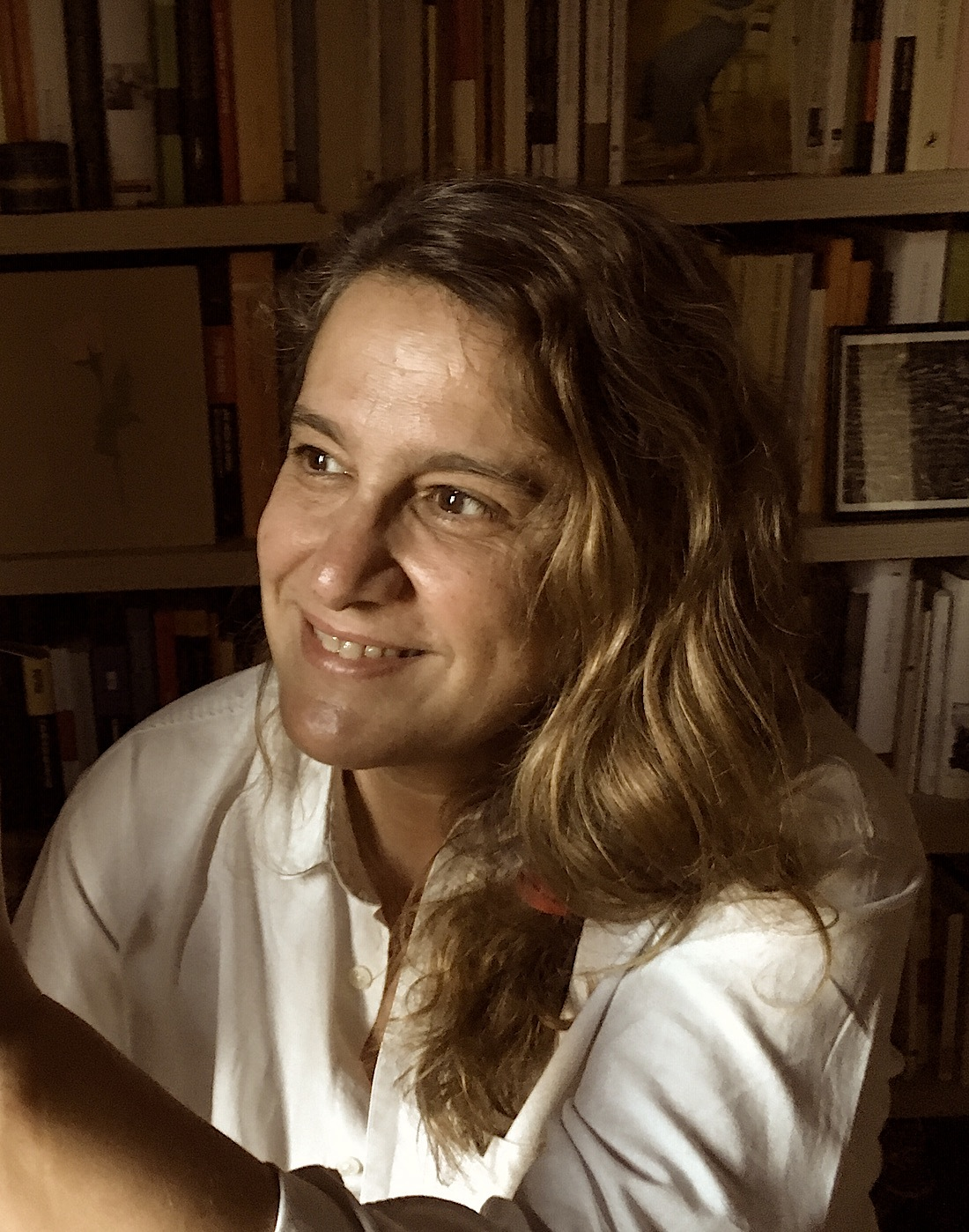
- Born: 28 November 1968 (age 57); Barcelona

Ada Castells Ferrer or Ada Castells (born 28 November 1968) is a Catalan professor, writer and journalist.

== Life ==
Castells was born in Barcelona in 1968.

Her first novel El dit de l'àngel involved her Protestant ancestors. It was published in Catalan (and Spanish) in 1998.

Castells was a professor in 1999. In 2004, her novel about the German painter Caspar David Friedrich, "Tota La Vida", was published. In 2010 she had teaching obligations at two universities and other colleges.

Her 2012 book Pura Sang (Pure Blood) was set in Minorca and it won the 32nd Premi Sant Joan Unnim for Catalan literature. Her 2019 novel "Mare" involves the differing memories of a woman and her daughter.
