= Ada Turner Kurtz =

American singer (1878–1947)

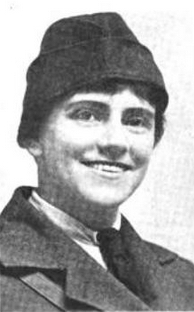
- Ada Turner Kurtz, from a 1919 publication
- Born: Ada Birdsall Turner; January 2, 1878; Stanningley, Yorkshire, U.K.
- Died: January 3, 1947 (aged 69); Los Angeles, California, U.S.
- Occupation(s): Singer, voice teacher

Ada Birdsall Turner Kurtz (January 2, 1878 – January 3, 1947) was an English-born American singer and voice teacher from Philadelphia. She entertained American troops in France and Belgium during World War I, earning the nickname "The Sunshine Lady."

== Early life and education ==
Turner was born in Stanningley, Yorkshire, the daughter of Jotham Harrison Turner and Mary Hannah Birdsall Turner. She moved to Philadelphia as a young child.

== Career ==
Kurtz was a concert soloist and voice teacher in Philadelphia and New York. Kurtz was head of the vocal department at the Philadelphia Conservatory of Music. In 1911, Kurtz sang a YMCA event in Atlantic City. Later that year, she was aboard a hot air balloon, attempting to achieve a women's distance record, when it was tugged by boat up the Delaware River.

During World War I, Kurtz spent a year in France and Belgium with the YMCA, entertaining American troops and acting as an informal chaplain, billed as "the Sunshine Lady". "Probably no woman in France is better known to the soldiers than Mrs. Ada Turner Kurtz," reported Musical America in early 1919. She taught at a summer training school for church song leaders in Indiana in 1920 and 1921. She gave a concert in Indiana in 1922. She taught voice students and gave performances at her own studio in Los Angeles in the 1930s.

Kurtz's students included Kathryn Meisle and gospel singer Homer Rodeheaver.

== Personal life ==
Ada Turner married American manufacturer Frederick Gross Kurtz in 1900; they had sons Robert and Allen, and they divorced in the 1910s. She died in 1947, in Los Angeles, at the age of 69.
