= Ades (artist) =

French anti-capitalist and anarchist squatter, cataphile and graffiti artist

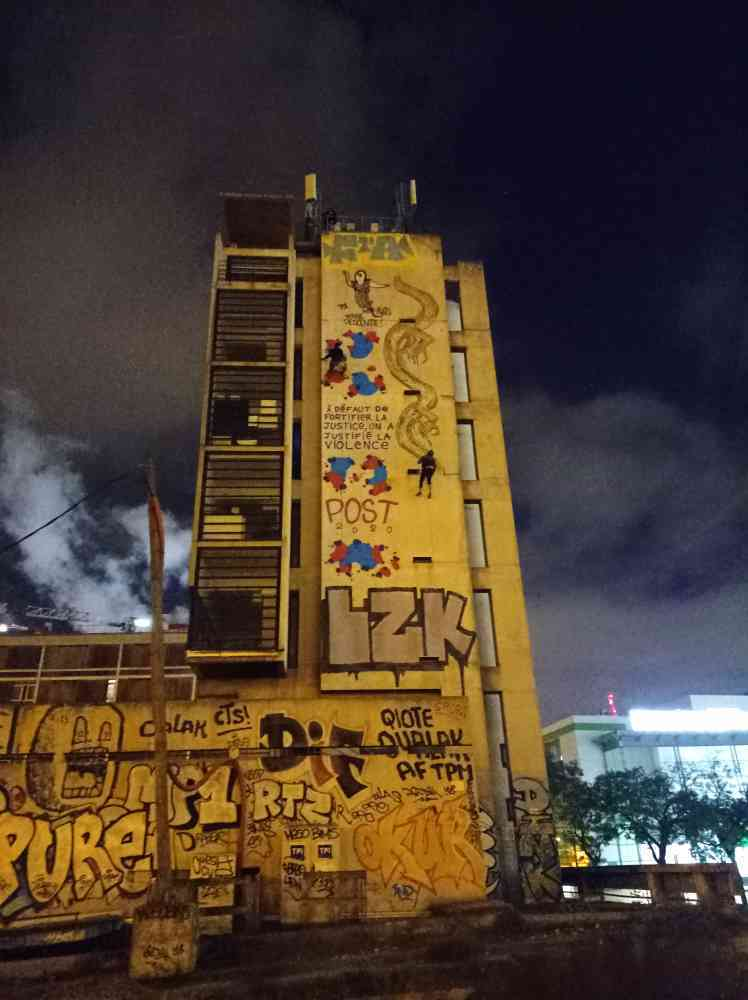
- Ades and another graffer doing a building in the 2020s
- Born: 1995; Paris, France
- Known for: Several graffiti in Île-de-France, organizing free parties or several squats
- Movement: Anarchist movement

Ades (born 1995) is a French anti-capitalist and anarchist squatter, cataphile and graffiti artist active in the first half of the 21st century.

Born in Paris in 1995, Ades grew up there before gradually joining the autonomous and anarchist circles of the Île-de-France region, focusing particularly on the organization of squats, free parties, and urban exploration initiatives in the catacombs and the Petite Ceinture.

The anarchist is distinguished by his involvement in the French graffiti scene, having created a significant number of works. His pieces often revolve around the creation of 'ghosts' that represent both himself and his ideas.

== Biography ==
Ades was born in Paris in 1995. He grew up in the 15th arrondissement of Paris.

He attended various high schools in this district, eventually joining a Catholic institution where he felt politically alienated from the majority of his classmates. During this time, he discovered the catacombs and the Petite Ceinture and began living in numerous squats. These were organized as self-managed spaces with an artistic focus, hosting various events. Ades reportedly chose this lifestyle and path of activism after experiencing severe precariousness; for instance, he was unable to secure a place in hostels for young workers, which had extremely long waiting lists at the time.

Ades is also involved in organizing and managing free parties, festive and political gatherings strongly influenced by anti-fascist and anarchist ideas. He has climbed numerous buildings, including Notre-Dame de Paris. In 2024, France 3 described Ades as a graffiti artist occupying a notable position within the French street art scene, an assessment shared by StreetPress.

== Artistic identity ==
The graffiti artist's visual style is particularly recognizable through his use of 'ghosts', which serve as both his way of representing the world and his way of representing and perceiving himself. He refers to these 'ghosts' as 'souls'.
