= Ade, Maharashtra =

Village in Maharashtra

Ade
- Village
- Interactive map of Ade
- Coordinates: 17.8904°N 73.0745°E
- Country: India
- State: Maharashtra

Ade is a small village in Ratnagiri district, Maharashtra state in Western India. The 2011 Census of India recorded 1,718 residents in the village. Ade's geographical area is 146 hectares (360 acres).
