= Ada Smith =

Ada Smith may refer to:

- Ada L. Smith (born 1945), American politician from New York
- Ada "Bricktop" Smith (1894–1984), American jazz singer and nightclub owner
- Ada Smith (gymnast) (1903–1994), British gymnast
- Ada Smith (poet) (1875–1898), British poet
