= Adda Motiram =

Village in Uttar Pradesh, India

Coordinates: 26.6873°N 83.4987°E

Adda Motiram is a village in Gorakhpur, Uttar Pradesh, India.
