= Ada Pilgrim =

New Zealand healer

Ada Pilgrim (1867–1965) was a New Zealand healer. She was born in Paparoa, Northland, New Zealand in 1867.
