= House of Holland (nobility) =

Noble family

Gerulfing / of Holland
- Noble family
- Coat of Arms
- Country: Netherlands; Belgium; Germany
- Founded: 9th century
- Founder: Gerulf I of Frisia
- Final ruler: John I, Count of Holland (in Holland); Otto V or Richardis (in Tecklenburg); Bernard (in Bentheim)
- Estates: County of Holland; County of Bentheim; County of Tecklenburg
- Dissolution: 1299; 727 years ago (in Holland); 1328; 698 years ago (in Tecklenburg); 1421; 605 years ago (in Bentheim)

The Gerulfings were the first family to rule over what would become the County of Holland and the County of Zeeland, then called West Frisia. The Gerulfings Dynasty from Gerulf I of Frisia, to John I, Count of Holland, Otto V or Richards, and Bernard ruled over the Counties fathering heirs for over 600 years.

== Origins ==
Coat of arms of the Bentheim family

They were named after Gerulf the Elder (died after 839), who is believed to have descended from the Frisian king Radbod (died 719). Dijkstra suggests that Dirk may have been the son of a sister of Gerolf and that his own father died while he was still an infant.

The first count of Holland, Dirk I, was the son or foster-son of Gerolf, Count in Frisia He received land around Egmond from Charles the Fat at a place called Bladella (modern-day Bladel near Eindhoven) in 922. This is seen as the beginning of the county of Holland. However, until about 1100, the usual names for the county were West-Friesland, Frisia or Kennemerland; in spite of this the counts from Dirk I onwards are traditionally named of Holland.

Note that the chronology of the first few counts is uncertain. The existence of a count between Dirk I and Dirk II was only recently suggested, since it is thought that the references to counts named Dirk between 896 and 988 refer to three, not two, different counts. This third Count Dirk is placed between Dirk I and II and numbered as Dirk I bis to avoid confusion with the already established numbering referring to the other counts of Holland named Dirk.

The main line of the family died out in 1299.

=== Bentheim and other branches ===
A branch of the dynasty held the County of Bentheim. The property was inherited through Sophia of Rheineck, married to Dirk VI of Holland. Their children split the property. This branch survived longer than the original family: it went extinct in 1421, after which Bentheim was inherited through non-direct female line.

Bastard lines of the family were the Van Teylingen, Van Brederode and Van der Duyn. The House of Egmond and the Van Wassenaer may also trace their origins to an illegitimate child from this family.

== Rulers ==
=== Gerulfing dynasty ===
Partitions under Gerulfing rule

| | Bentheim under House of Salm | Tecklenburg under Tecklenburg family |
| County of West Frisia; Later renamed County of Holland (885-1299) | | Tecklenburg under Tecklenburg family |
| County of West Frisia; Later renamed County of Holland (885-1299) | County of Bentheim (1176-1421) | County of Tecklenburg (1279-1328) |
| Inherited by the House of Avesnes | County of Bentheim (1176-1421) | County of Tecklenburg (1279-1328) |
| Inherited by the House of Avesnes | County of Bentheim (1176-1421) | Inherited by the County of Schwerin |
| Inherited by the House of Avesnes | Inherited by the Götterswyk family | Inherited by the County of Schwerin |

Table of rulers

| Monarch | Born | Reign | Ruling part | Consort | Death | Notes |
|---|---|---|---|---|---|---|
| Gerulf I the Elder | c.820 Son of ? | c.840 – 855 | County of West Frisia | A daughter of Waldger of Corbie at least four children | c.855 aged 34-35 | First ruler of the family in West Frisia. |
| Gerulf II | c.850 Son of Gerulf I | 855 – 896 | County of West Frisia | Unknown two children | 896 aged 45-46 | |
| Dirk I | c.875 Son of Gerulf II | 896 – 5 October 939 | County of West Frisia | Geva of Hamaland at least one child | 5 October 939; Andernach aged 63-64 | Recent historians propose a 'Dirk I bis' for the latter part of Dirk I's reign (roughly from c.931). |
| Dirk II | c.920 Son of Dirk I and Geva of Hamaland | 5 October 939 – 6 May 988 | County of West Frisia | Hildegard of Flanders; 950 three children | 6 May 988; Egmond aged 67-68 | |
| Arnulf of Ghent | c.950 Ghent; Son of Dirk II and Hildegard of Flanders | 6 May 988 – 18 September 993 | County of West Frisia | Lutgardis of Luxembourg; May 980 three children | 18 September 993; Winkel aged 42-43 | |
| Regency of Lutgardis of Luxembourg (993-1005) | | | | | | |
| Dirk III of Jerusalem | 982; Son of Arnulf and Lutgardis of Luxembourg | 18 September 993 – 27 May 1039 | County of West Frisia | Othelindis of Saxony (d.9 March 1044) three children | 27 May 1039; Egmond aged 56-57 | |
| Dirk IV | 1016; First son of Dirk III and Othelindis of Saxony | 27 May 1039 – 13 January 1049 | County of West Frisia | Unmarried | 13 January 1049; Dordrecht aged 32-33 | |
| Floris I | 1017; Vlaardingen; Second son of Dirk III and Othelindis of Saxony | 13 January 1049 – 28 June 1061 | County of West Frisia | Gertrude of Saxony c.1050 three children | 28 June 1061; Nederhemert aged 43-44 | |
| Regency of Gertrude of Saxony (1061-1093) and Robert I, Count of Flanders (1067-1093) | | | | | | Dirk V is the first to be called Count of Holland. |
| Dirk V | 1052; Vlaardingen; Son of Floris I and Gertrude of Saxony | 28 June 1061 – 17 June 1091 | County of Holland | Othethild (ca.1065-18 November 1120); 1083 two children | 17 June 1091; Geldern aged 38-39 | Dirk V is the first to be called Count of Holland. |
| Floris II the Fat | 1085; Vlaardingen; Son of Dirk V and Othethild | 17 June 1091 – 2 March 1121 | County of Holland | Gertrude-Petronilla of Lorraine c.1105 four children | 2 March 1121 aged 35-36 | |
| Regency of Gertrude-Petronilla of Lorraine (1121-1131) | | | | | | The early reign of Dirk VI was marked by conflict. After a rebellion from her second son, Floris, Gertrude supported him and associated him to her regency in 1129-1131. However, after a second rebellion, she returned her support to her eldest son, and Floris didn't recover power. Floris was eventually assassinated by Dirk's supporters. |
| Dirk VI | 1114; The Hague; First son of Floris II and Gertrude-Petronilla of Lorraine | 2 March 1121 – 1129 August 1131 – 5 August 1157 | County of Holland (from 1150 with the County of Bentheim, ruling with his wife) | Sophia of Salm, Countess of Bentheim c.1135 nine children | 5 August 1157 aged 42-43 | The early reign of Dirk VI was marked by conflict. After a rebellion from her second son, Floris, Gertrude supported him and associated him to her regency in 1129-1131. However, after a second rebellion, she returned her support to her eldest son, and Floris didn't recover power. Floris was eventually assassinated by Dirk's supporters. |
| Floris (III) the Black | c.1115 Second son of Floris II and Gertrude-Petronilla of Lorraine | 1129 – August 1131 | County of Holland (from 1150 with the County of Bentheim, ruling with his wife) | Unmarried | 26 October 1132 near Utrecht aged 17-18 | The early reign of Dirk VI was marked by conflict. After a rebellion from her second son, Floris, Gertrude supported him and associated him to her regency in 1129-1131. However, after a second rebellion, she returned her support to her eldest son, and Floris didn't recover power. Floris was eventually assassinated by Dirk's supporters. |
| Floris III | c.1140 The Hague; First son of Dirk VI and Sophia of Salm, Countess of Bentheim | 5 August 1157 – 1 August 1190 | County of Holland | Ada of Scotland; 28 August 1162; Egmond eleven children | 1 August 1190; Antioch aged 49-50 | Children of Dirk VI, divided the inheritance. |
| Otto I | c.1145 Second son of Dirk VI and Sophia of Salm, Countess of Bentheim | 5 August 1157 – 1208 | County of Bentheim (ruling with his mother until 1176) | Alberada of Arnsberg five children | 1208 aged 62-63 | Children of Dirk VI, divided the inheritance. |
| Dirk VII | c.1165 First son of Floris III and Ada of Scotland | 1 August 1190 – 4 November 1203 | County of Holland | Adelaide of Cleves; 1186 three children | 4 November 1203; Dordrecht aged 37-38 | |
| Ada | 1188; Daughter of Dirk VII and Adelaide of Cleves | 4 November 1203 – 14 October 1206 | County of Holland | Ada of Scotland; 28 August 1162; Egmond eleven children | 1237 aged 48-49 | Claimants to the succession of Dirk VII. Dirk wanted for his brother to succeed him, but his widow pushed their daughter Ada for the inheritance, marrying her to the count of Loon, who should rule alongside his wife; The inheritance struggle motivated the Loon War: Ada was sent to England and her husband didn't have enough supporters; the matter was eventually settled in 1206, establishing a co-rulership between them, but soon undone, as by 1210 William was already using the title alone, which may indicate the abandonment of Ada's claim. William is noted for participating in the Fifth Crusade: on his way to Egypt, stopped in Portugal and helped to conquer Alcácer do Sal. |
| William I | c.1167 The Hague; Second son of Floris III and Ada of Scotland | 4 November 1203 – 4 November 1203 | County of Holland | Adelaide of Guelders; 1198; Stavoren five children Maria of Brabant; July 1220 five children | 4 February 1222; The Hague aged 54-55 | |
| Baldwin the Courageous | c.1180 Son of Otto I and Alberada of Arnsberg | 1208 – May 1248 | County of Bentheim | Judith of Rietberg five children | May 1248 aged 67-68 | |
| Regency of Baldwin, Count of Bentheim (1222-1224) | | | | | | |
| Floris IV | 24 June 1210; The Hague; Son of William I and Adelaide of Guelders | 4 February 1222 – 19 July 1234 | County of Holland | Matilda of Brabant; December 1224 five children | 19 July 1234; Corbie aged 24 | |
| Regency of Matilda of Brabant (1234-1235); Regency of William of Holland (1235-1238); Regency of Otto (III), Bishop of Utrecht (1238-1239) | | | | | | Also King of Germany from 1247. |
| William II | February 1227; Son of William I and Adelaide of Guelders | 19 July 1234 – 28 January 1256 | County of Holland | Elisabeth of Brunswick-Lüneburg; 25 January 1252; Braunschweig two children | 28 January 1256; Hoogwoud aged 28 | Also King of Germany from 1247. |
| Otto II | c.1215 Bentheim; Son of Baldwinand Judith of Rietberg | May 1248 – 1280 | County of Bentheim (from 1262 with the County of Tecklenburg, ruling with his wife until 1264) | Judith one child Heilwig, Countess of Tecklenburg c.1245 three children | c.1280 Tecklenburg aged 74-75 | |
| Regency of Floris of Holland, the Guardian (1256-1258); Regency of Adelaide of Holland, Countess of Hainaut (1258-1263); Regency of Otto II, Count of Guelders (1263-1266) | | | | | | |
| Floris V The Peasant's God | 24 June 1254; Leiden; Son of William II and Elisabeth of Brunswick-Lüneburg | 28 January 1256 – 27 June 1296 | County of Holland | Beatrice of Flanders; 1269 eleven children | 27 June 1296; Muiderberg aged 42 | |
| Egbert I | 18 March 1253; Bentheim; First son of Otto II and Heilwig, Countess of Tecklenburg | 1280 – 1307 | County of Bentheim (from 1262 with the County of Tecklenburg, ruling with his wife until 1264) | Hedwig of Oldenburg (d. 2 February 1304); May/June 1277 thirteen children | 1311; Tecklenburg aged 57-58 | Children of Otto II, divided the inheritance. In 1307, Egbert resigned his county to join the Teutonic Order. |
| Otto III | c.1255 Tecklenburg; Second son of Otto II and Heilwig, Countess of Tecklenburg | 1280 – 1285 | County of Tecklenburg | Richardis of the Mark; April/May 1251 five children | c.1285 Ibbenbüren aged 29-30 | Children of Otto II, divided the inheritance. In 1307, Egbert resigned his county to join the Teutonic Order. |
| Regency of Richardis of the Mark (1285-1297) | | | | | | |
| Otto IV | c.1280 Son of Otto III and Richardis of the Mark | 1285 – 3 May 1307 | County of Tecklenburg | Beatrice of Rietberg (1275-1325); 1296 two children | 3 May 1307 aged 26-27 | |
| Regency of John III, Lord of Renesse (1296-1297); Regency of Wolfert I van Borselen (1297-1299) | | | | | | Left no descendants. The county was inherited by his cousin John, son of the previous regent Adelaide of Holland. |
| John I | 1284; Son of Floris V and Beatrice of Flanders | 27 June 1296 – 10 November 1299 | County of Holland | Elizabeth of England; 7 January 1297; Ipswich no children | 10 November 1299; Haarlem aged 14-15 | Left no descendants. The county was inherited by his cousin John, son of the previous regent Adelaide of Holland. |
Holland inherited by the House of Avesnes
| Otto V | 1301; Son of Otto IV and Beatrice of Rietberg | 3 May 1307 – 4 May 1328 | County of Tecklenburg | Kunigunda van Daalle c.1315 no children | 4 May 1328 aged 26-27 | Left no children. |
| John | c.1283 Son of Egbert I and Hedwig of Oldenburg | 1307 – 21 July 1333 | County of Bentheim | Matilda of Lippe; 3 August 1310 eight children | 21 July 1333 aged 49-50 | |
| Richardis | c.1290 Daughter of Otto IV and Beatrice of Rietberg | 4 May 1328 – c.1328? | County of Tecklenburg | Gunzelin VI, Count of Schwerin c.1310 five children | c.1328? aged 37-38? | Heiress of her brother. It is not certain if she survived him. |
Tecklenburg inherited by the County of Schwerin
| Simon | c.1310 First son of John and Matilda of Lippe | 21 July 1333 – 1344 | County of Bentheim | Catharina of Steinfurt c.1335? no children | 1344 aged 33-34 | Left no children. The county passed to his younger brother. |
| Otto III | 1327; Second son of John and Matilda of Lippe | 1344 – 1364 | County of Bentheim | Unmarried | 1379 aged 49-50 | Also provost of Domkapitel Münster. Abdicated to his younger brother. |
| Bernard | c.1330 Third son of John and Matilda of Lippe | 1364 – 2 November 1421 | County of Bentheim | Petronilla of Steinfurt (1359-November 1404); 2 October 1370 no children | 2 November 1421; Bentheim aged 90-91 | Left no descendants. Bentheim was inherited by his great-nephew, grandson of his sister Hedwig. |
Bentheim inherited by the Götterswyk family

== Bibliography ==
- Detlev Schwennicke, Europäische Stammtafeln Band II. (1984) Table 2:
- A. W. E. Dak: Genealogie der graven van Holland. ’s-Gravenhage 1954
- A. C. F. Koch: Oorkondenboek van Holland en Seeland tot 1299 I. ’s-Gravenhage 1970
- J. G. Kruisheer: De oorkonden en de kanselerij von den graven van Holland tot 1299 II. ’s-Gravenhage-Haarlem 1971
- Johanna Maria van Winter: Die Hamaländer Grafen als Angehörige der Reichsaristokratie im 10. Jahrhundert,. in: Rheinische Vierteljahresblätter 44 (1980), p. 14–46
- Johanna Maria van Winter: Ansfrid en Dirk twee namen uit de Nederlandse Geschiedenis van de 10e en 11e eeuw. in: Naamkunde. 13. Jahrgang (1981), p. 39–74
- Johanna Maria van Winter: De vornaamste adelijk geslachten in de Nederlanden 10e en 11e eeuw. in: Algemene Geschiedenis der Nederlanden I. Haarlem-Bussum 1981, p. 225–229
