= Pernille =

Pernille is a Danish and Norwegian female given name derived from Petronella, and may refer to:

- Pernille Agerholm (born 1991), Danish table tennis player
- Pernille Christensen (born 1974), Danish politician
- Pernille Dupont, retired female badminton player from Denmark
- Pernille Fischer Christensen (born 1969), Danish film director and sister of actor Stine Fischer Christensen
- Pernille Harder (badminton) (born 1977), female badminton player from Denmark
- Pernille Harder (footballer) (born 1993), female association football player from Denmark
- Pernille Holmboe (born 1977), Norwegian model, living in London
- Pernille Kaae Høier (born 1991), Danish actress
- Pernille Nedergaard (born 1967), retired female badminton player from Denmark
- Pernille Rose Grønkjær (born 1973), Danish film director
- Pernille Rosenkrantz-Theil (born 1977), former member of Folketinget (Danish parliament) for the Red-Green Alliance
- Pernille Sams (born 1959), Danish real estate agent, lawyer and politician
- Pernille Skipper, (born 1984), Danish politician, Folketing member, and political spokesperson for the Red-Green Alliance since 2016
- Pernille Svarre (born 1961), Danish athlete
- Pernille Sørensen (born 1977), Norwegian actress
- Pernille Vermund (born 1975), Danish politician and architect
- Pernille Weiss (born 1968), Danish politician

== See also ==
- Pernilla, the corresponding Swedish name
- Perilla
