= Petronella (disambiguation) =

Petronella or Petronilla is a feminine given name. It may also refer to:

- Petronella (film), a 1927 German-Swiss silent film
- Petronella, United States Virgin Islands, a settlement
- Petronella, a traditional Anglo-Celtic tune and associated country dance form - see contra dance choreography

== See also ==
- Petronila (disambiguation)
- Perpolita petronella, a species of land snail
- "Hej, sa Petronella", a Swedish children's song
- Petronel, a 16th or 17th century firearm
