= Adelaide of Guelders =

Countess consort of Holland

- Born: c. 1182
- Died: 1218
- Buried: Rijnsburg Abbey
- Noble family: House of Wassenberg
- Spouse: William I, Count of Holland
- Issue: Floris IV; Otto; William; Richarda; Ada
- Father: Otto I, Count of Guelders
- Mother: Richardis of Bavaria

Adelaide of Guelders (Dutch: Aleid, c. 1182 – 1218) was the daughter of Count Otto I of Guelders and his wife, Richardis. Also known as Adelaide of Bellich or Alice of Guelders.

Probably around 1198, in Stavoren, she married Count William I of Holland. They had five children:

1. Floris IV (24 June 1210 in The Hague–19 July 1234 in Corbie, France), succeeded his father as Count of Holland
2. Otto (d. 1249), Regent of Holland in 1238–1239, Bishop of Utrecht
3. William (d. 1238), Regent of Holland in 1234–1238.
4. Richarda (d. 1262)
5. Ada (d. 1258), Abbess at Rijnsburg from 1239 until her death

Adelaide died in 1218, while her husband was away on the Fifth Crusade. She was buried in Rijnsburg Abbey.
