= Rijnsburg =

- Town
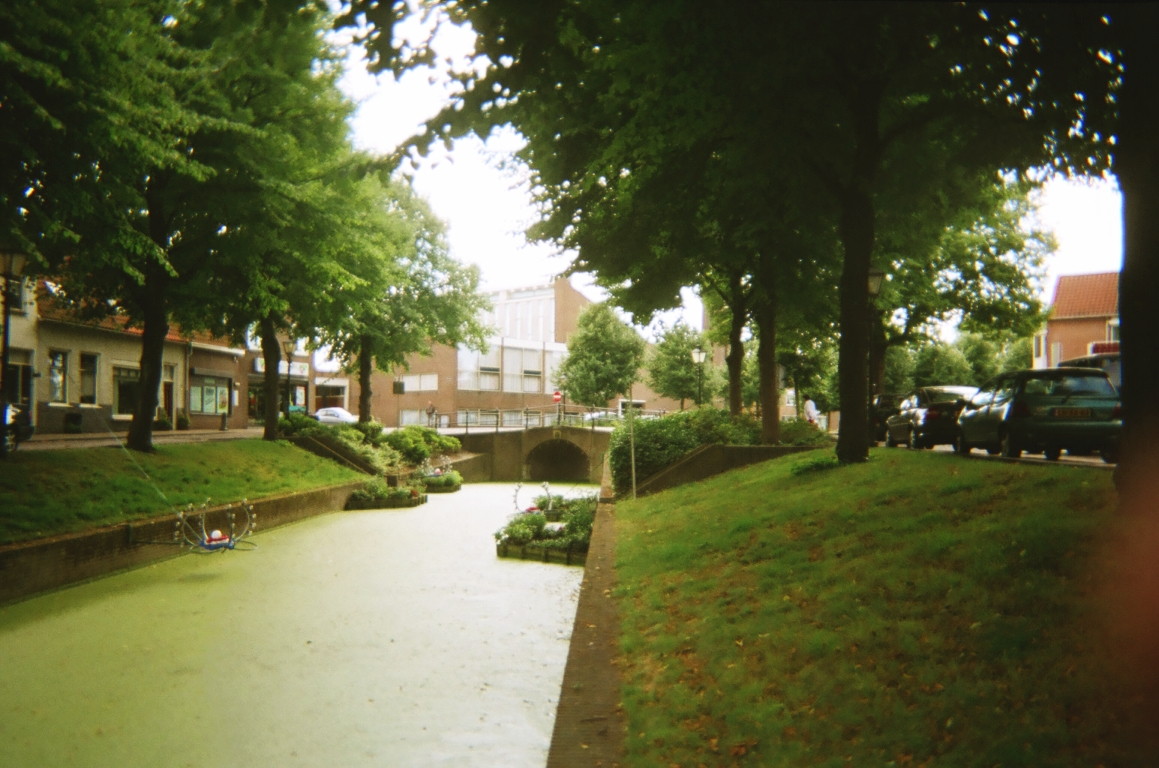
- The river Vliet flowing through Rijnsburg's old village centre

- Flag Coat of arms

- Location in the province of South Holland in the Netherlands Location in the Netherlands
- Coordinates: 52°11′N 4°26′E
- Country: Netherlands
- Province: South Holland
- Municipality: Katwijk

Area
  - Total: 6.06 km^{2} (2.34 sq mi)
- Elevation: 0.6 m (2.0 ft)

Population (2021)
  - Total: 16,880
  - Density: 2,790/km^{2} (7,210/sq mi)
- Time zone: UTC+1 (CET)
  - Summer (DST): UTC+2 (CEST)
- Postal code: 2231
- Dialing code: 071

Rijnsburg (Dutch: [ˈrɛinzbʏr(ə)x]) is a village in the eastern part of the municipality of Katwijk, in the western Netherlands, in the province of South Holland. It lies on the Oude Rijn, from which it takes its name.

== History ==
Rijnsburg used to be a separated municipality until 1 January 2006, when, together with Valkenburg, it was added to the municipality of Katwijk. Before that, the municipality covered an area of 6.07 km^{2} (2.34 sq mi) of which 0.21 km^{2} (0.081 sq mi) was water, and had a population of 14851 inhabitants (1 June 2005).

Rijnsburg's main claim to fame is that the philosopher Spinoza lived there from 1661 to 1663. The modest house in which he lived is still preserved, and can be visited.

Rijnsburg is located in an area called the "Dune and Bulb district" (Duin- en Bollenstreek) and is one of the locations of the flower auction company Royal FloraHolland.

Rijnsburg Abbey was established by Petronilla of Lorraine, consort of Floris II, Count of Holland, in 1133. It flourished for many years. Two of her granddaughters, Sophie and Hedwig, would later join this abbey, one of them as abbess.

=== Archeological finds ===
In 1913 a buckle, the mount with red, white and blue enamel, and the square coin were found together in a cemetery at Rijnsburg. The impressive gilded buckle with interwoven filigree and enamel inlay was probably made in Kent (England) across the Channel. These finds amongst others indicate that the mouth of the Rhine was home to some people of very high status, perhaps even royalty.

=== Burials at Rijnsburg Abbey ===
- Floris the Black
- Petronilla of Lorraine
- Dirk VI, Count of Holland
- William I, Count of Holland
- Floris IV, Count of Holland

== Gallery ==
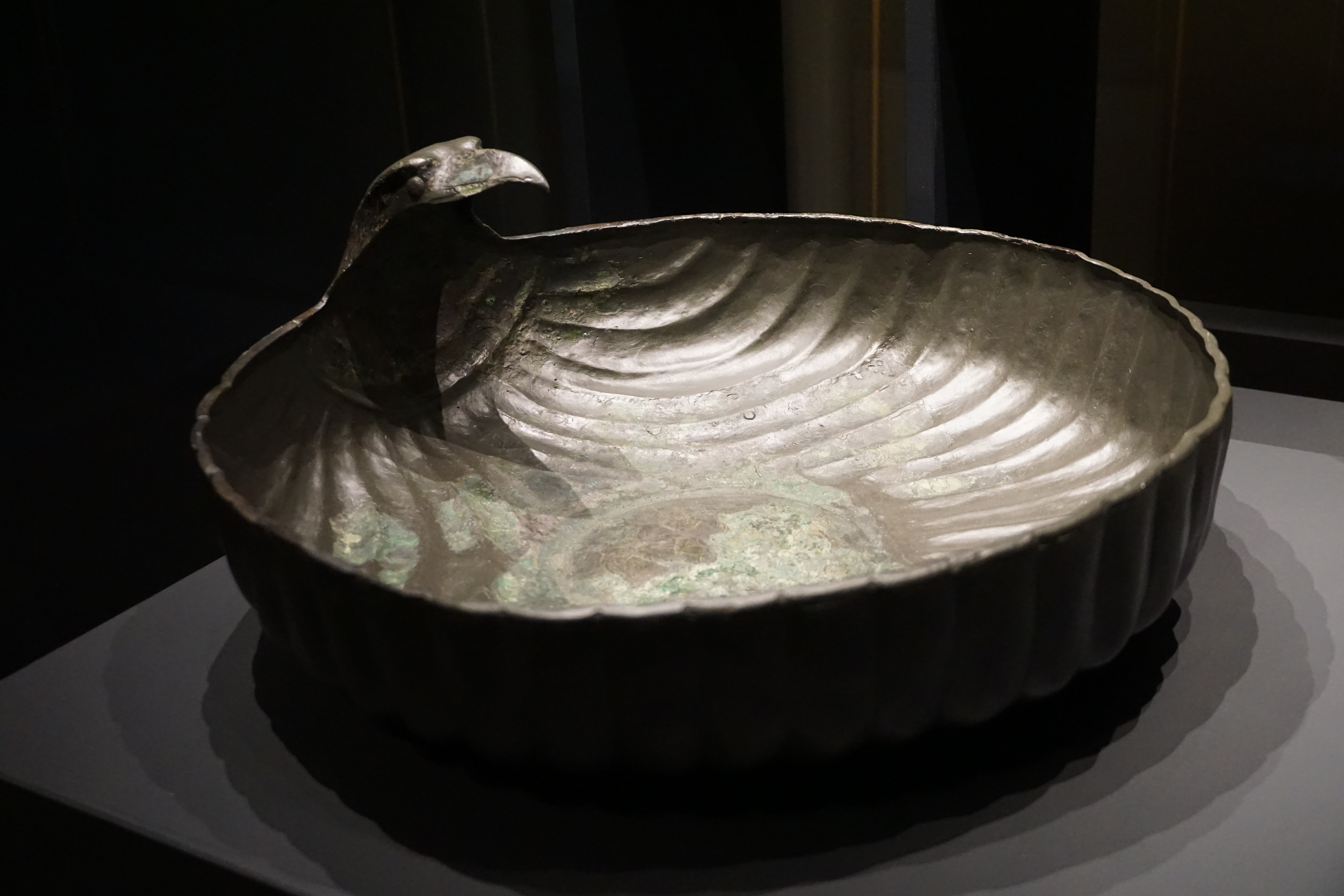
Roman bronze bowl with bird's head (250-330 AD), found in Rijnsburg

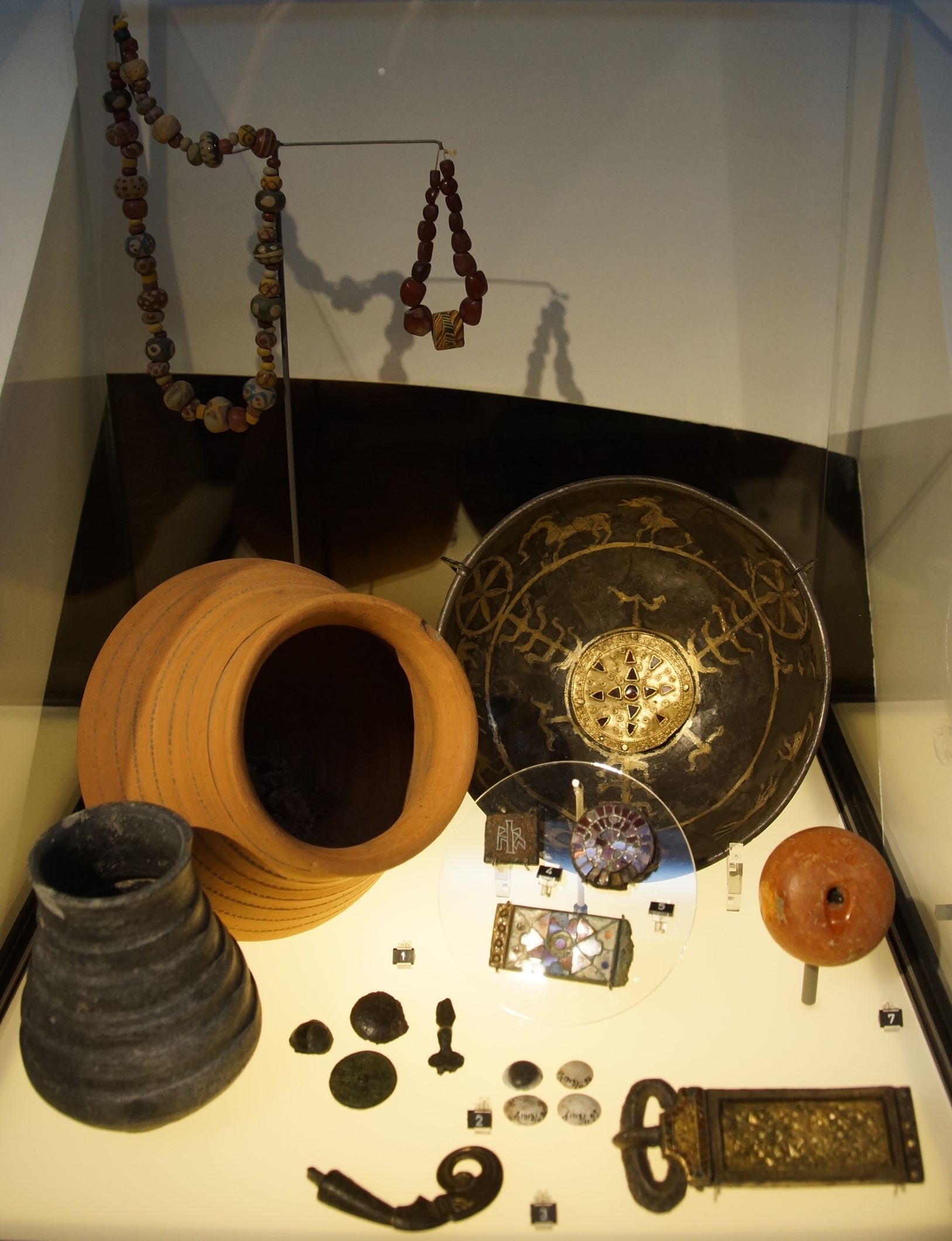
Archaeological finds from Rijnsburg, now exhibited in the Rijksmuseum van Oudheden in Leiden

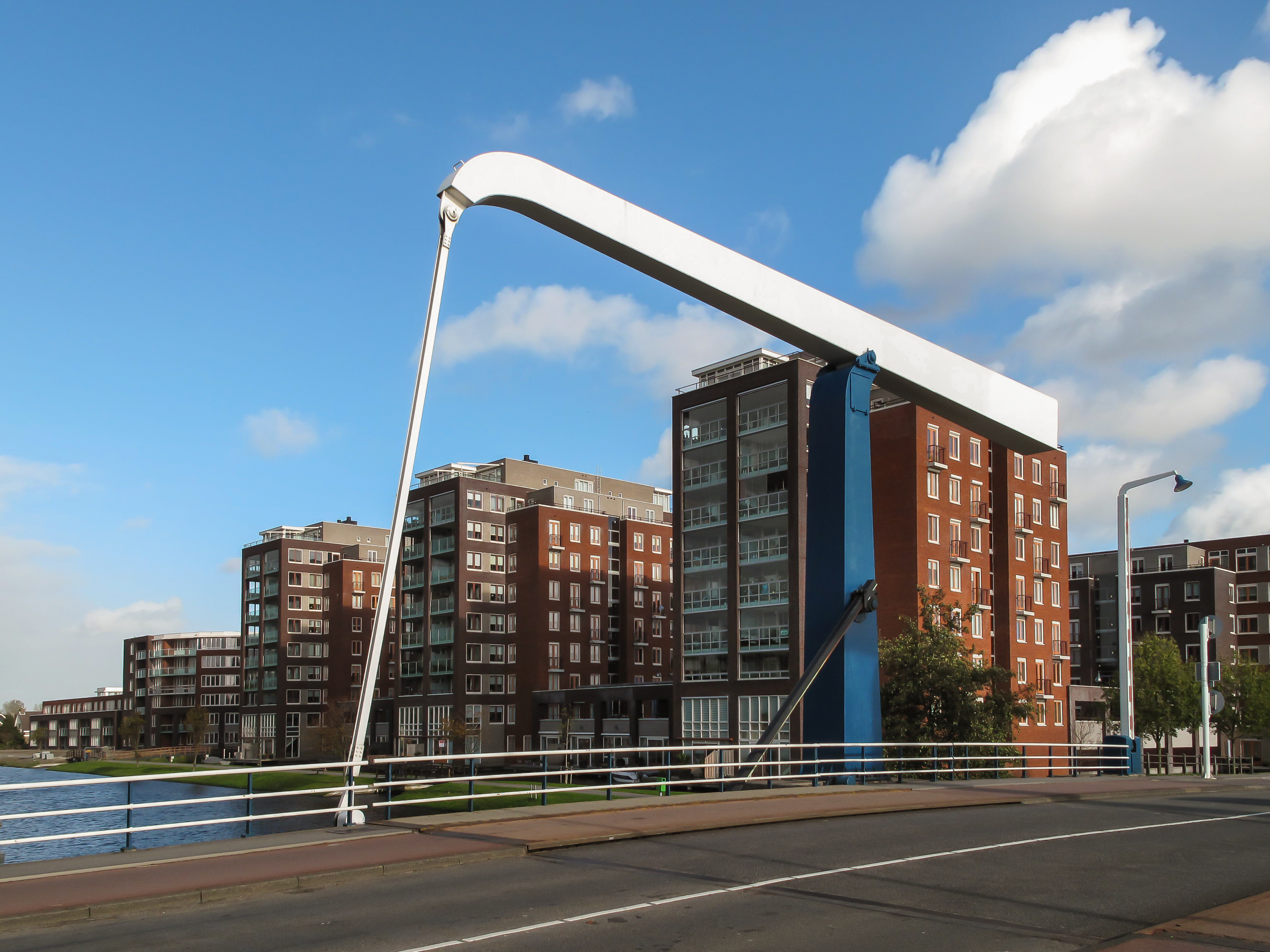
Rijnsburg, drawbridge and modern blocks

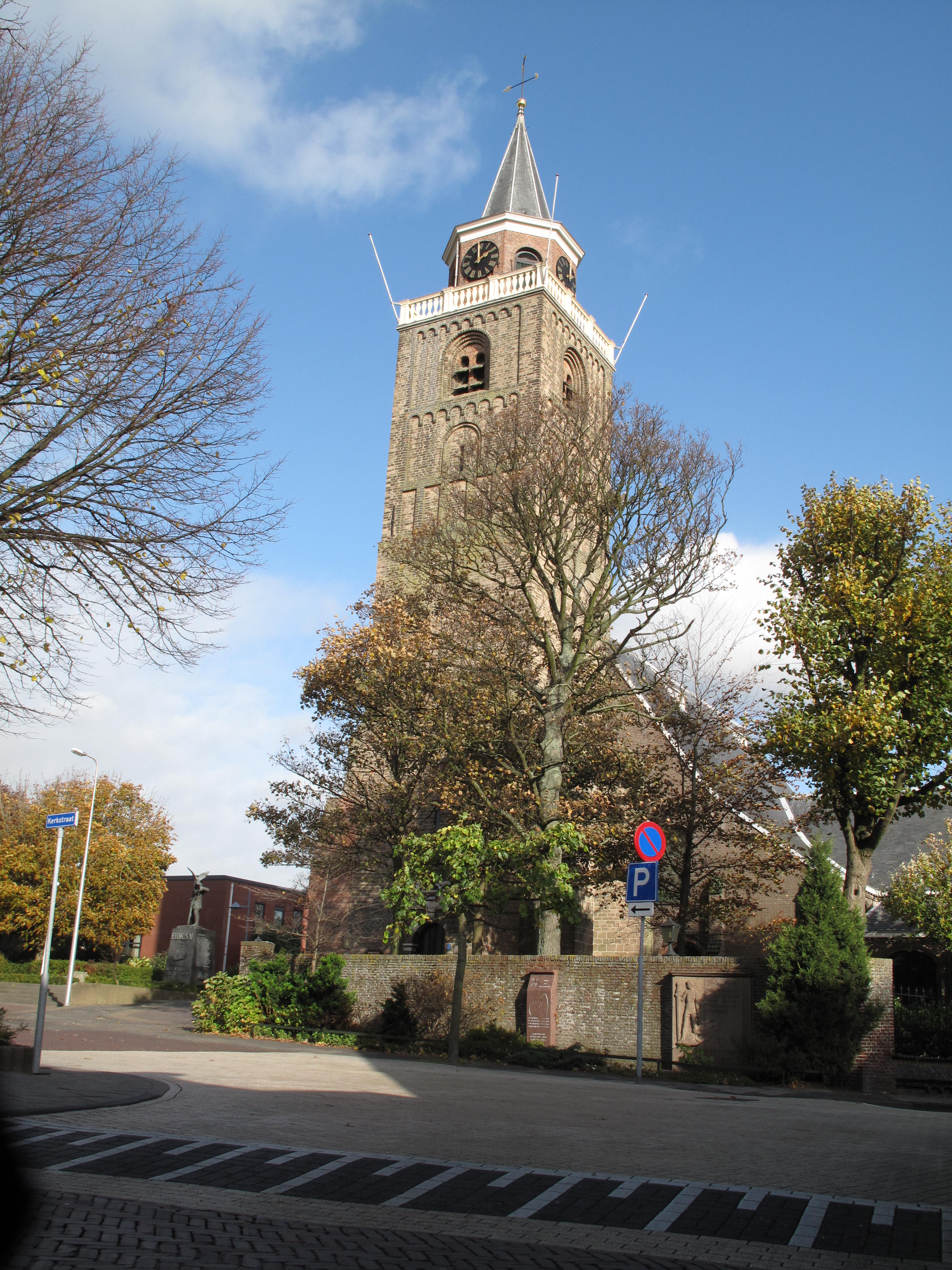
The Great Church
