= Cistercian Abbey of Roermond =

Cistercian nunnery in the Netherlands

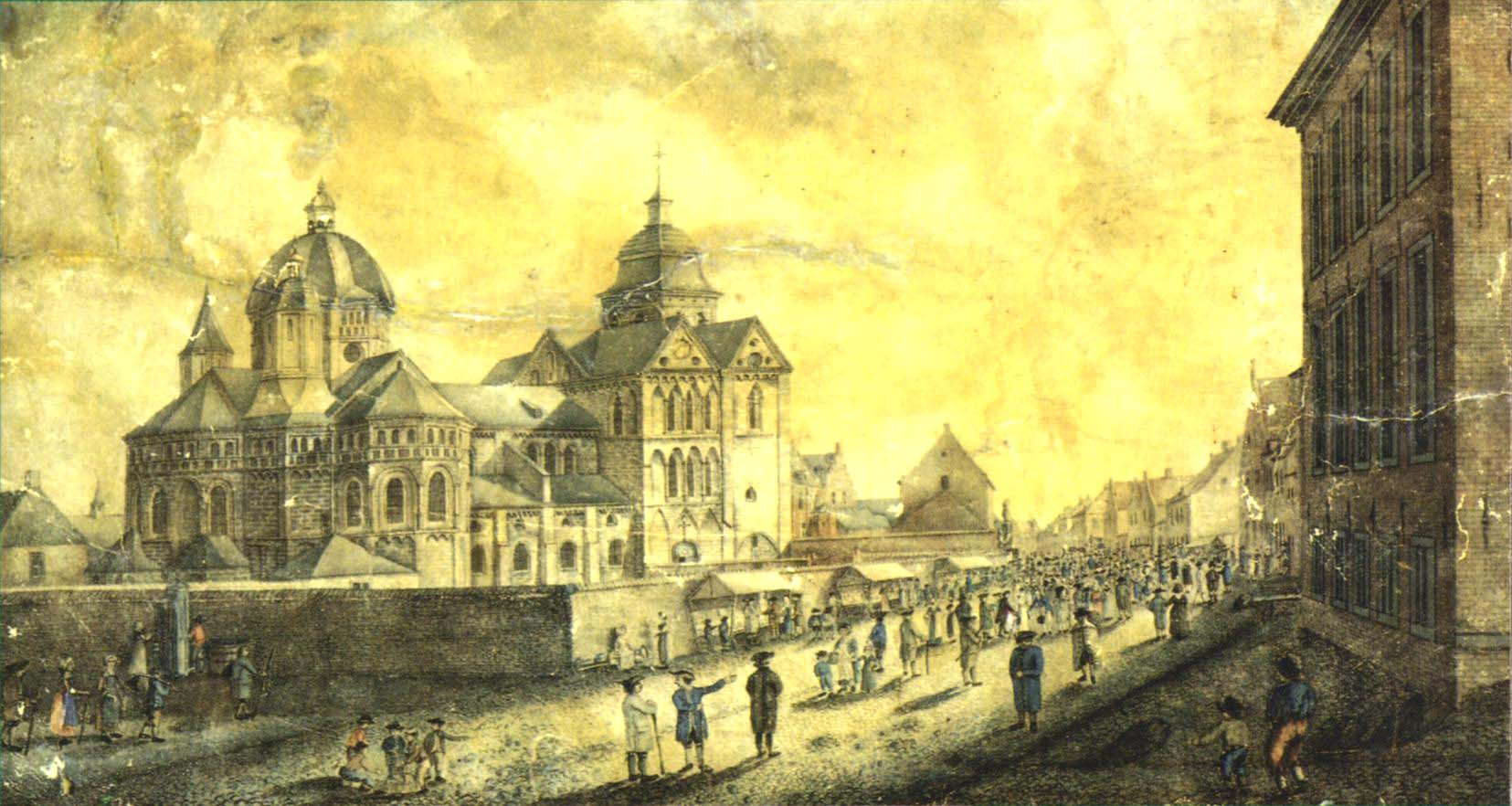
The Munster Abbey in the 18th century

The Cistercian Abbey of Roermond or Munsterabdij was a Cistercian nunnery in Roermond that existed from 1224 to 1797 and of which the Munsterkerk is the only physical remnant.

== History ==
=== Name ===
The name Munsterabdij — at the end of the 18th century Abdije Munster — is formed by the words abdij, abbey, and munster, which comes from the Latin monasterium, itself meaning monastery. It was originally called the Monastery of the Blessed Virgin Mary (Dutch: Klooster van de Heilige Maagd Maria).

=== Monastery foundation and history until 1797 ===
The official foundation of the monastery can be established on 16 June 1224. That is when, in the presence of the papal legate Conrad van Urach, the foundation deed was signed by Gerard III, Count of Guelders, and his wife, Margaret of Brabant. However, this signing was only a legal formality, as the monastery had been established in Roermond several years earlier, from 1218. The monastery church was incorporated in the Cistercian order in 1220, although the building might not have been completed by then. It was consecrated by the Archbishop of Cologne. The first abbess was Richardis of Bavaria, widow of Count Otto I of Guelders and mother of Gerard III. At her request, the abbot of Kamp was appointed visitor by the pope. She died in 1231 and was buried in the abbey.

On 18 February 1797, the sisters were forced to leave the convent by the French. Seven remaining nuns then moved in with one Mrs. Luitjens, but later all returned to their parental home. The last abbess of the abbey, Maria Josepha de Broich, died in Roermond on 8 February 1808.

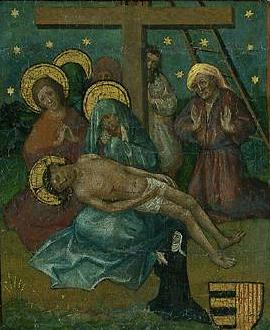
Abdis Bela van Mirlaer van Millendonck, depicted on the Roermond Passion, 1425-55 (Rijksmuseum, Amsterdam)

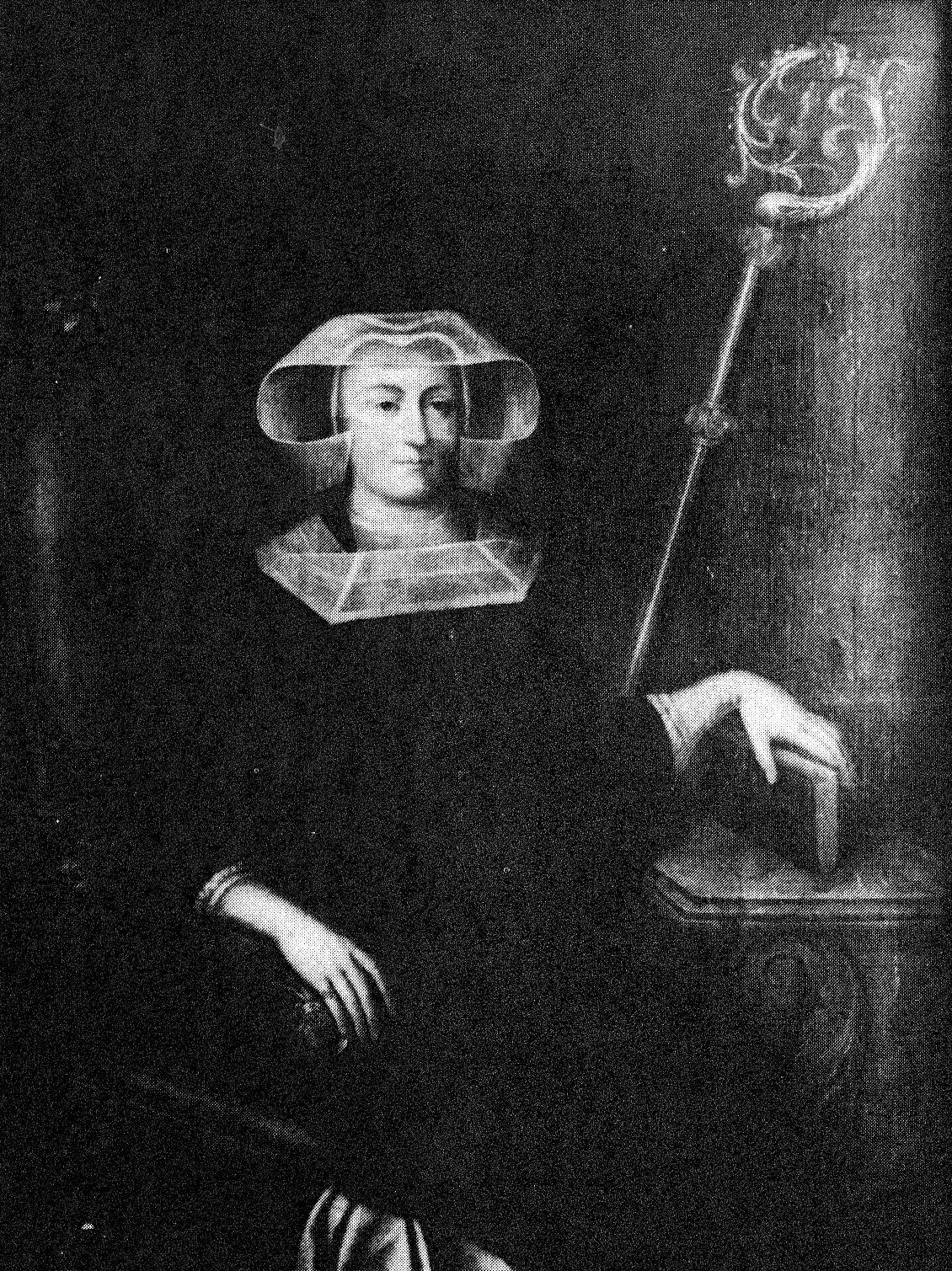
Maria Caecilia van Eyck, 30th abbess of the Munsterabdij (anonymous portrait, 1768 (?))

=== List of abbesses of the Munster Abbey ===
1. Richardis of Bavaria (from 1222 held the title of abbess)
2. Elisabeth of Guelders
3. Oda of Jülich
4. Clementina of Guelders
5. Agnes van Herpen
6. Elisabeth van Swalmen
7. Gertrude van Ravenach
8. Fritswindis van Swalmen
9. Bela van Malbourg
10. Bertha van Driel
11. Margaret van Elmpt
12. Mary van Driel
13. Bela van Mirlaer van Millendonck (abbess from 1447)
14. Aleidis van Bommel
15. Wilhelmina van Kessel (also called Wilhelmina de Kessel; fl. 15th century)
16. Bela van Dript
17. Jacoba van Erp
18. Agnes van Barick
19. Elisabeth van Flodrop
20. Anna van Barick
21. Agnes van Imstenraede
22. Anna van Ruyschenbergh
23. Susanna van Pardo
24. Adama van Egeren
25. Hermanna van Poll
26. Francisca d'Alsace Bossu
27. Maria Margaretha de Wijenhorst ex Donck
28. Adriana (or Adrienne) Albertina de Rheede de Saesvelt (abbess 1705–1728)
29. Anna Francisca van der Heyden, called Belderbusch
30. Maria Cecilia van Eyck (died 12 April 1771)
31. Maria Josepha de Broich (abbess until 1797; died 8 February 1808).

== Monastic buildings ==
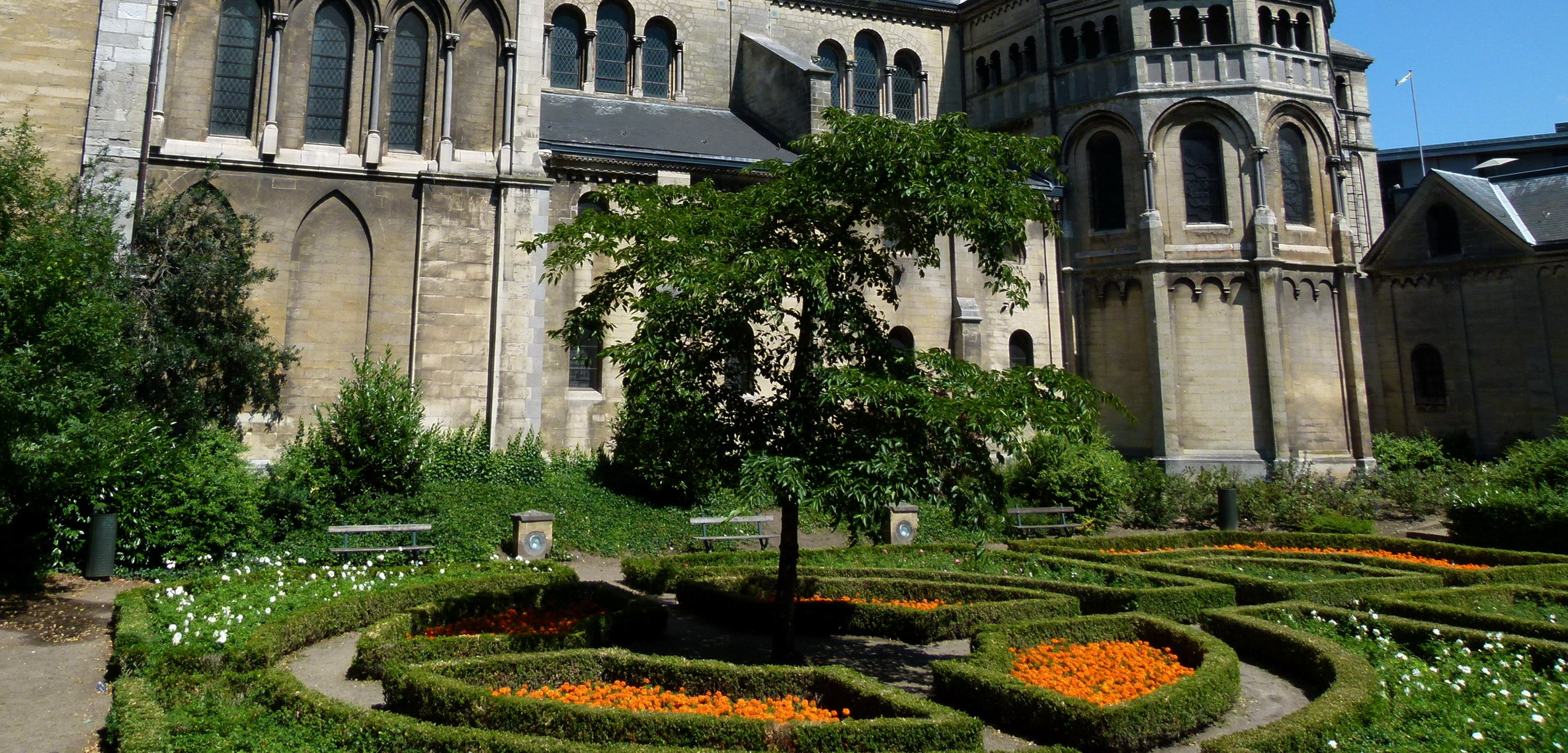
Park on the site of disappeared abbey buildings

The Munsterkerk, today a parish church, is the only remnant of the monastery. Originally on the south side of this church there was a cloister with the refectory, chapter house, palace hall (?) and, on the first floor, the dormitory. West of the Munsterkerk, where the music kiosk now stands on Munsterplein, originally stood the abbesses' house, which is mentioned as early as 1293. There was a building on Hamstraat, which probably served as a guest house. The large gate, which gave access to the monastery grounds, was also located on the same Hamstraat.

During the French occupation, the abbess house was used as a prison while the other buildings served as barracks. When the prison was moved elsewhere in the middle of the 19th century, the abbess house and some other dilapidated buildings were demolished to make way for a public park. What remained of the other buildings was demolished in 1924, despite a fierce rescue by priest and history expert Mgr. Van Gils.

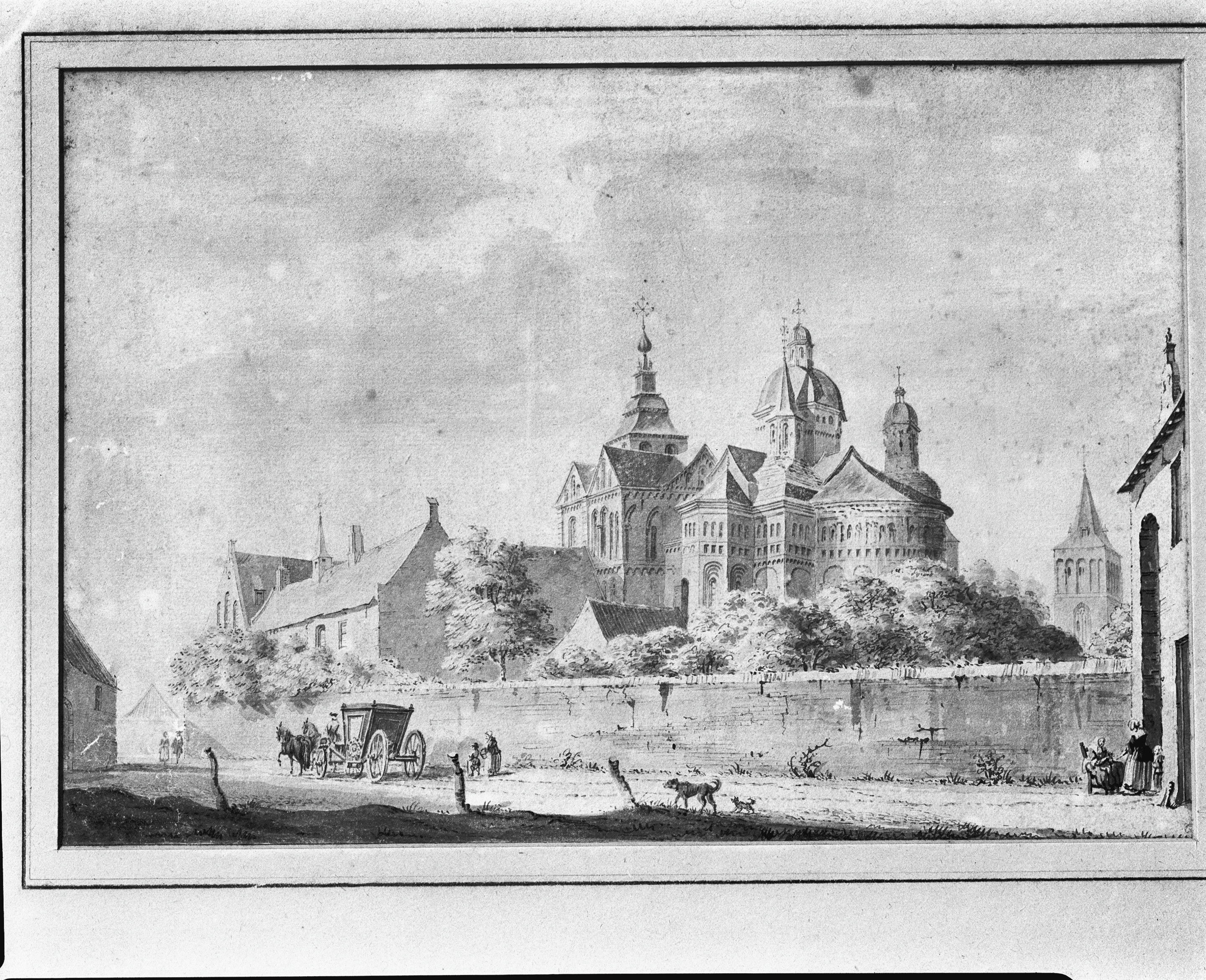
Ommuurd complex, 1738

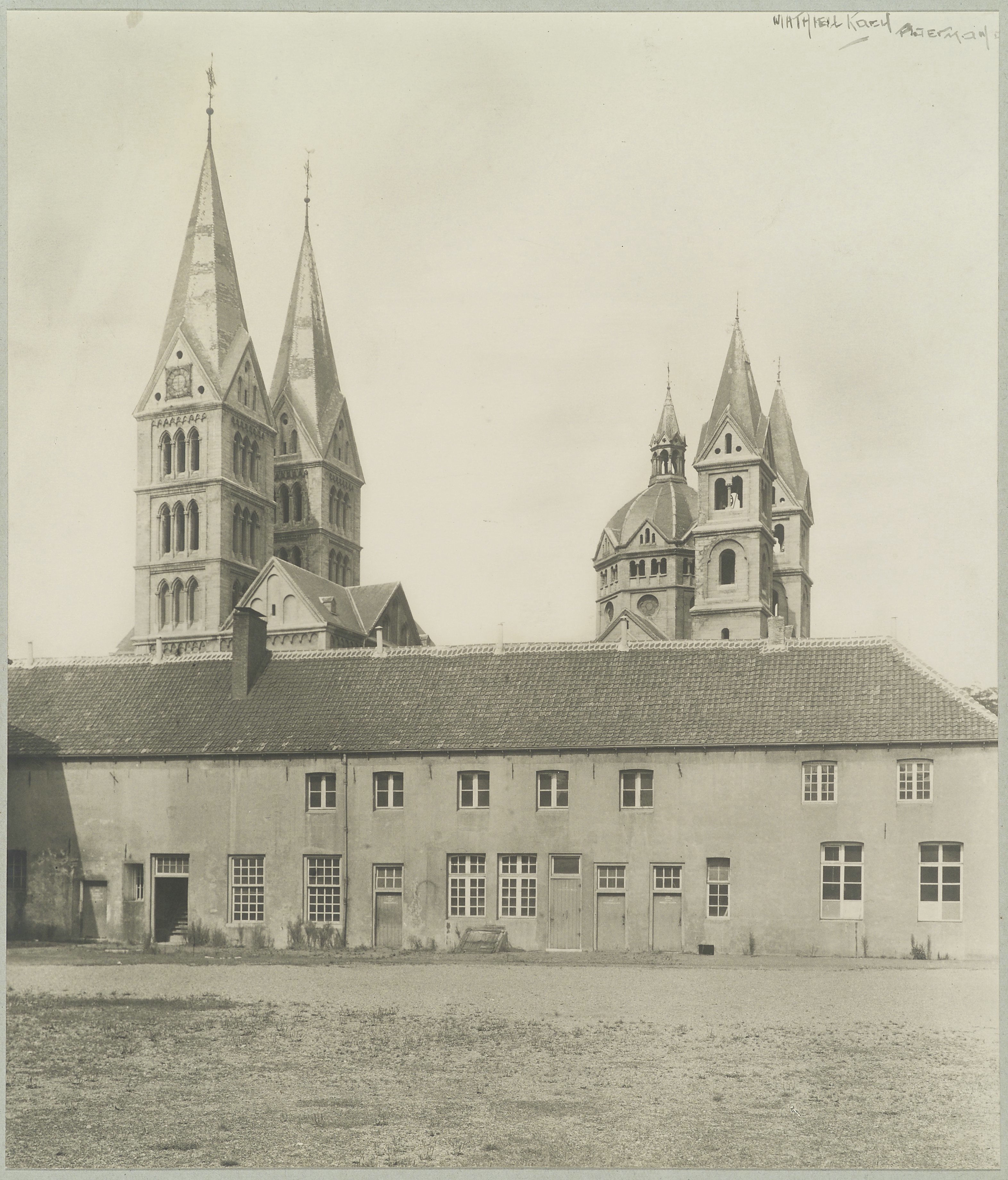
Monastery wing, before 1924

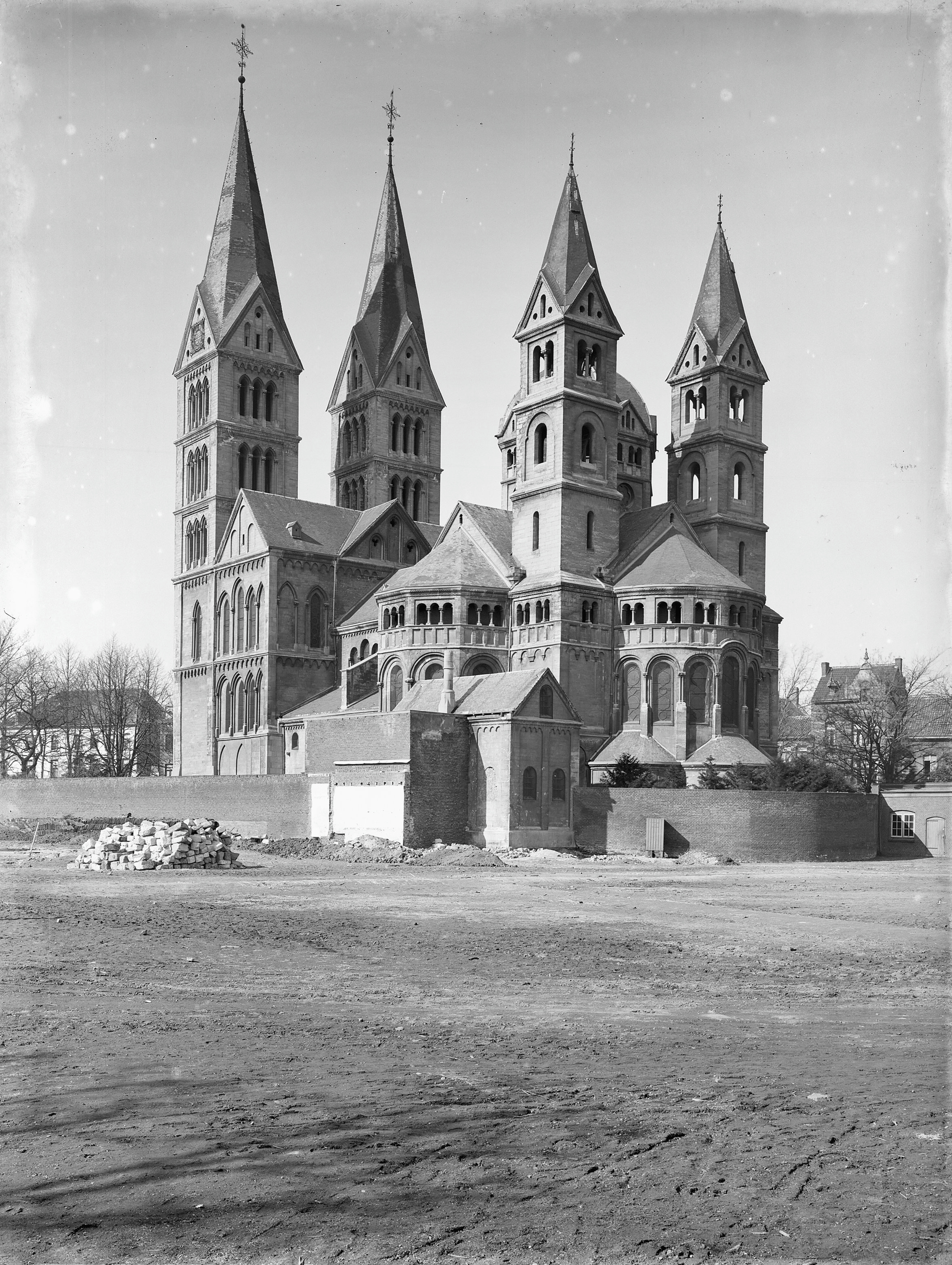
After the demolition, 1924

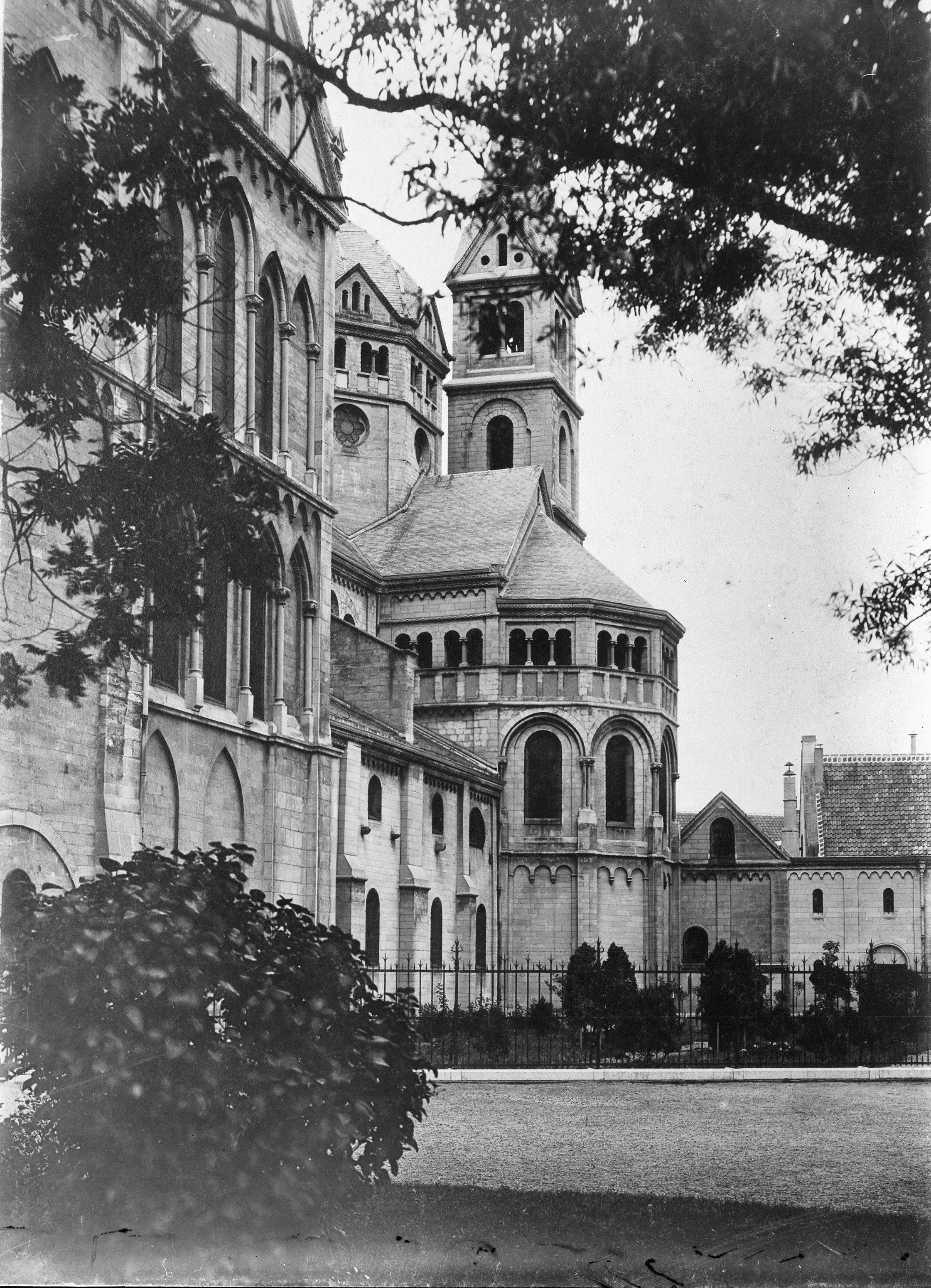
Redesigned area
