= Lilium 'Navona' =

Lily cultivar

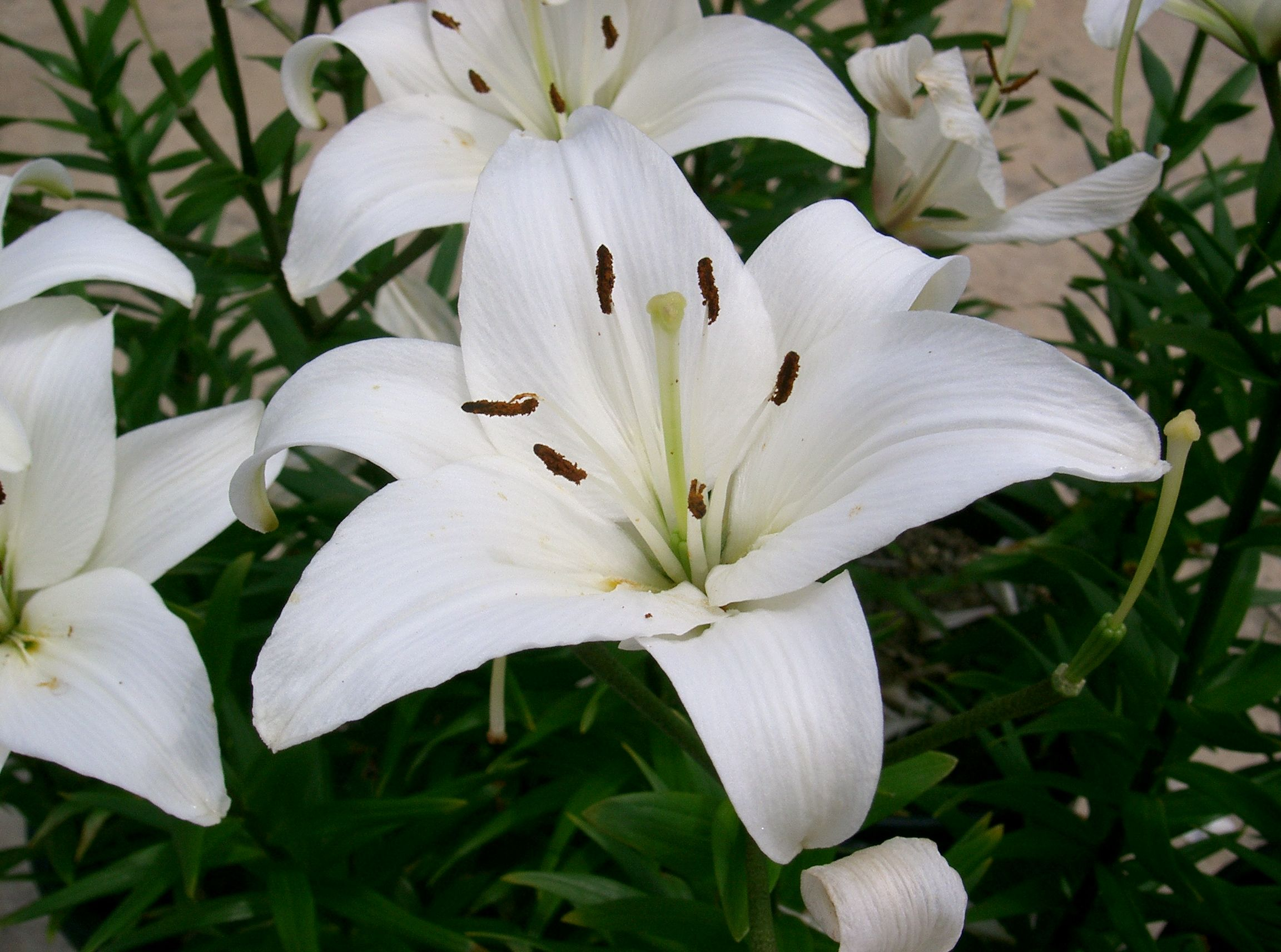
- Cultivar: 'Navona'
- Origin: Rijnsburg, The Netherlands

Lilium 'Navona' is an Asiatic lily hybrid variety of white lilies, used in cut-flower production worldwide.

== Description ==
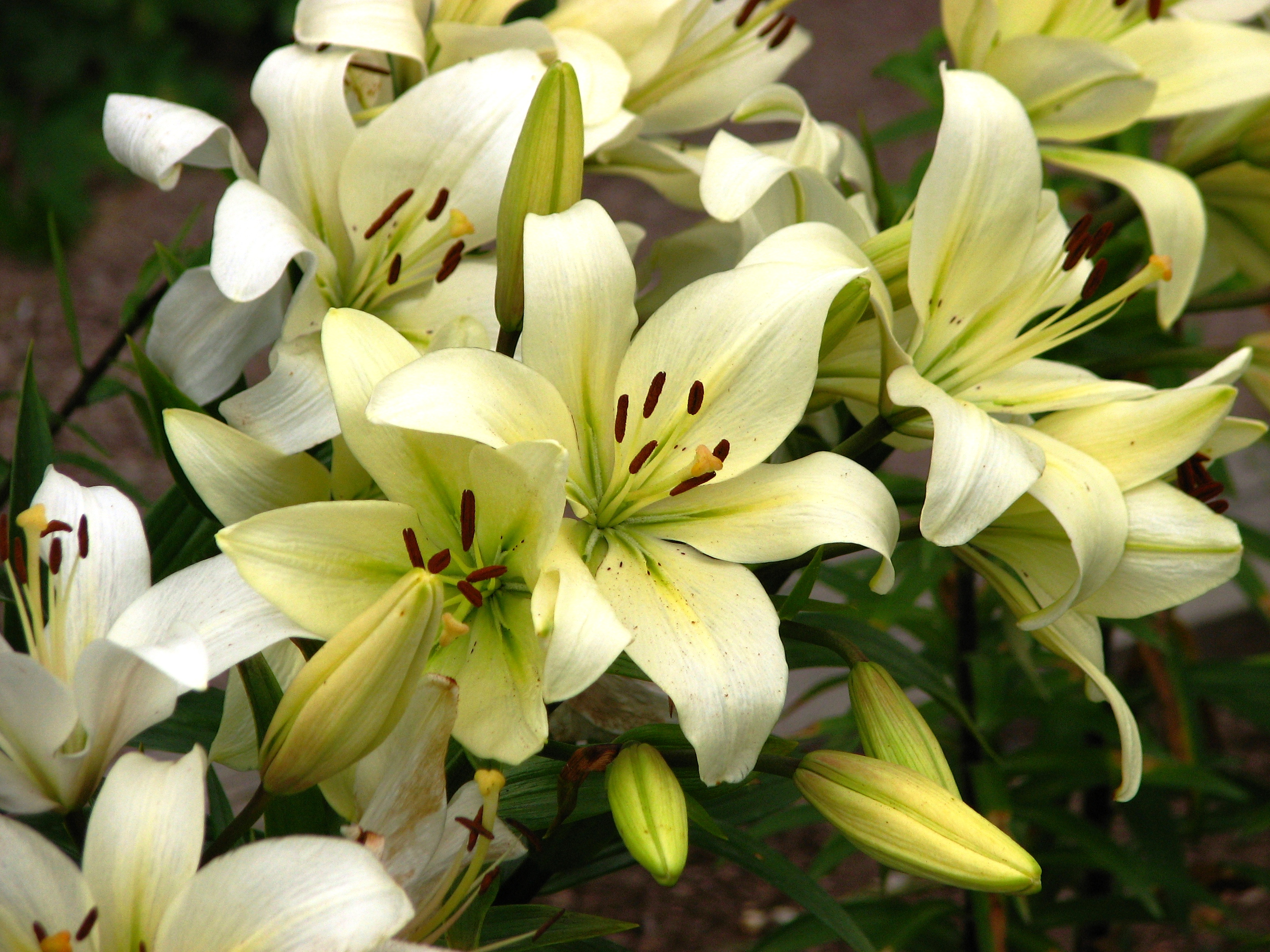

It has big upward-facing, white flowers, with dark green foliage, that flower from late spring to early summer. They can grow up to 26"-32" / 66.0 cm - 81.3 cm high.

== History ==
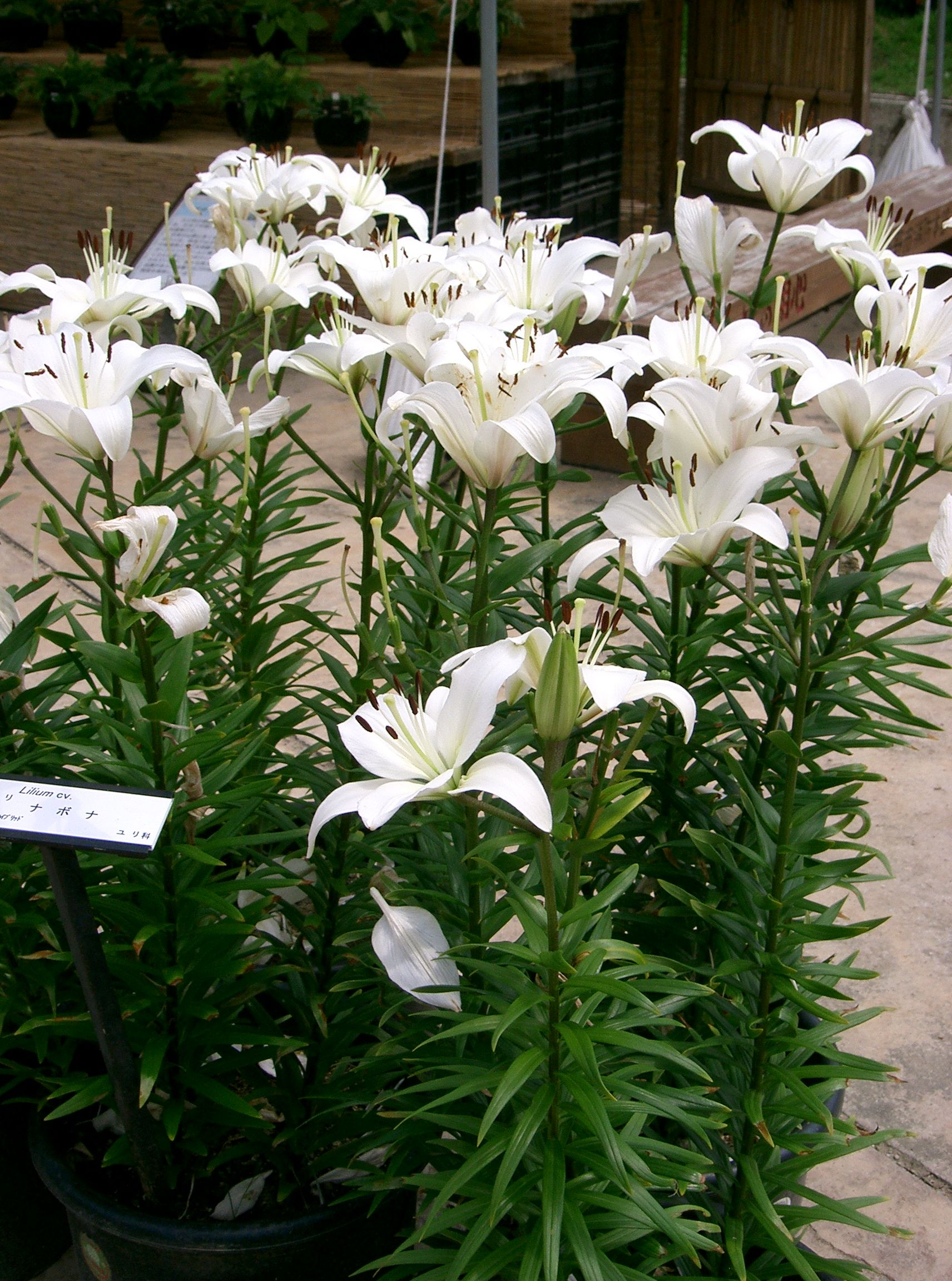

It was created by Gebr. Vletter and Den Haan in Rijnsburg, The Netherlands, in the eighties.

== Cultivation ==
It is hardy to between USDA Zone 3 and Zone 9.

It prefers positions in full sun or partial shade, in well-drained soils.

It can be grown in containers.
