= Pernilla =

Pernilla is a Swedish female given name derived from Petronella, and may refer to:

- Pernilla Andersson (born 1969), Swedish singer and songwriter
- Pernilla August (born 1969), Swedish actress
- Anna Pernilla Backman (born 1969), Swedish composer, artist and singer known as Meja
- Pernilla Karlsson (born 1990), Finland Swedish singer who represented Finland in the Eurovision Song Contest 2012
- Pernilla Månsson Colt (born 1966), Swedish journalist and producer
- Pernilla Stålhammar (born 1971), Swedish politician
- Pernilla Wahlgren (born 1967), Swedish singer and actress
- Pernilla Wiberg (born 1970), Swedish former alpine ski racer and winner of two Olympic gold medals

== See also ==
- Pernille, the corresponding Danish and Norwegian name
