= Kloosterkerk =

In the Netherlands the word Kloosterkerk or monasterium refers to a church that is or was connected to a monastery. Examples include:

- Kloosterkerk, The Hague
- Kloosterkerk, Assen
- Munsterkerk (at Roermond)
