= Richardis of Bavaria =

German noblewoman

- statue by Joep Thissen, 1954

Abbess of Roermond
- Reign: 1222 – 1231
- Successor: Elisabeth of Guelders
- Born: 1173; Kelheim, Bavaria
- Died: 20 September 1231; Roermond, Duchy of Guelders
- Buried: Church of Our Lady in Roermond
- Noble family: House of Wittelsbach
- Spouse: Otto I, Count of Guelders
- Issue Detail: Gerard III; Adelaide; Otto
- Father: Otto I Wittelsbach, Duke of Bavaria
- Mother: Agnes of Loon

Richardis of Bavaria (1173 – 20 September 1231) was a German noblewoman. She was a daughter of Count Palatine Otto I of Bavaria, who later became the first Wittelsbach Duke of Bavaria, and his wife Agnes of Loon.

Richardis married Otto I of Guelders, and after his death became the first abbess of the Cistercian Abbey of Roermond. She died in 1231 and was buried in the Church of Our Lady, today the only surviving part of the abbey.

== Life ==
Richardis was an influential person in Gelderland politics. Her family carried the same lion in their coat of arms as the counts of Guelders. Around 1188, she married Otto I, Count of Guelders. They had many children together, including three sons, as specified by the Genealogia Ottonis II Ducis Bavariæ. Their known children are: Henry, who died young, shortly after his engagement to Aleidis (born c. 1186), daughter of Dirk VII of Holland; Gerard, the Count of Guelders and Zutphen; Otto, who is recorded as Otto I's brother in one document and was Provost of Xanten before becoming Bishop of Utrecht at a very young age; Irmgard, Margaret, Matilda, and Adelaide, who married William I of Holland. Another son, Ludwig, is mentioned in two documents.

Richardis was deeply religious. After Otto I died in 1207, she had a house built on the Elberg near the hermitage Bethlehem near Doetinchem, where she stayed from time to time. There she devoted herself to God and supported the monastic community.

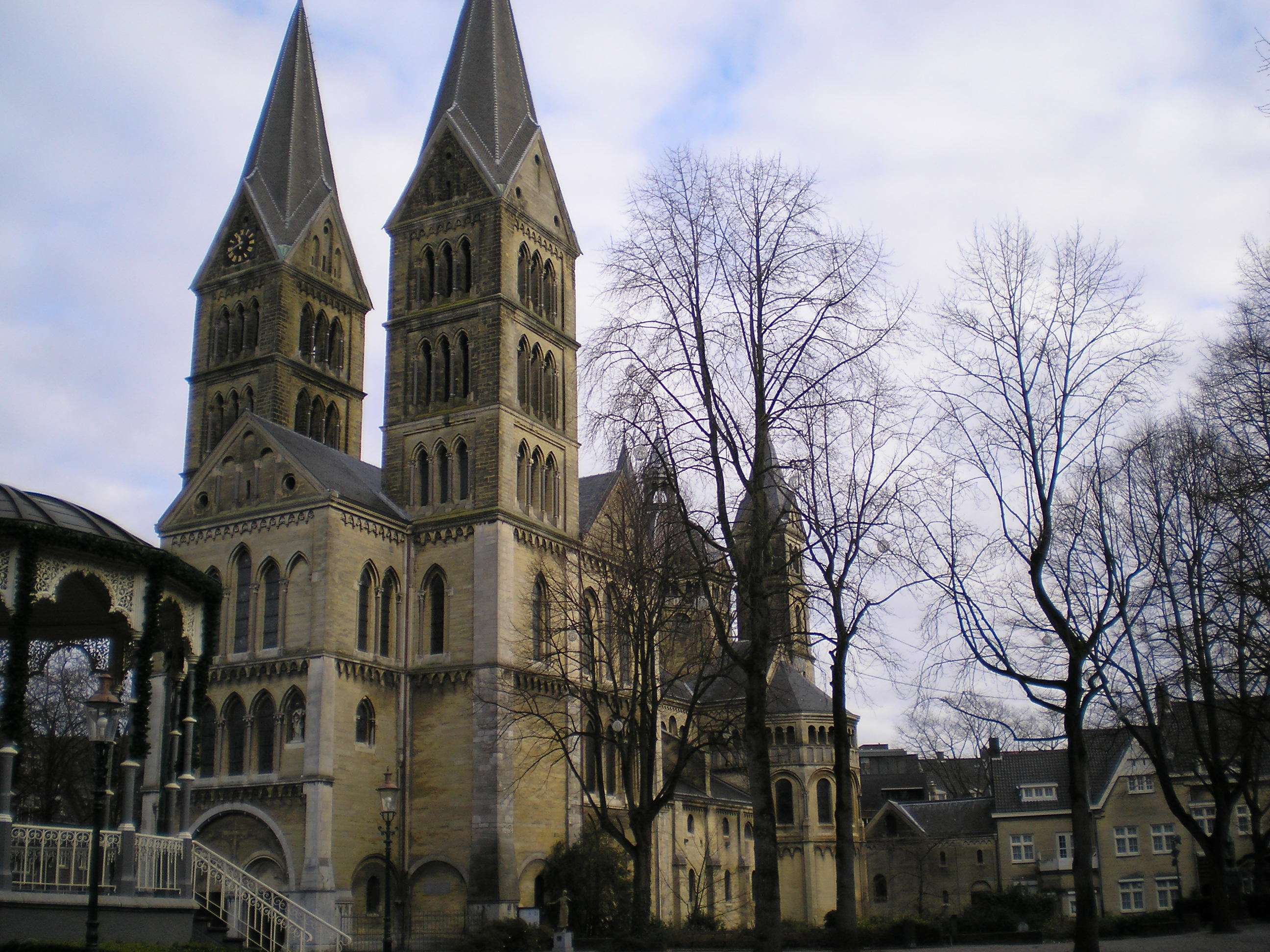
The Munsterkerk of the former Munsterabdij in Roermond, in which Richardis was buried

The Gelderland counts had close ties with the Cistercian order, in particular with the Kamp Abbey. Together with her husband, Richardis was a member of the Altenberg Abbey prayer community. At the end of the 12th century, Otto I had a plan to found a Cistercian monastery himself, but had not implemented it. Ten years after her husband's death, Richardis wanted to join this order. Because Guelders did not have a Cistercian monastery, in 1218 her son Count Gerard III founded in Roermond the Onze-Lieve-Vrouwenmunster, the Cistercian Abbey of Roermond, of which today only the Munsterkerk survives. Richardis became the first abbess of this women's abbey. The abbot of Kamp Abbey was appointed as a visitator.

In 1228 she founded the monastery Mariënhorst near Deventer. Richardis survived her son Gerard III Count of Guelders who died in 1229. Her grandson Otto II Count of Guelders and Zutphen granted Harderwijk city rights in 1231. These rights were probably transferred from the Roermond rights on behalf of Richardis.

She died in Anagni on 21 September 1231 after a visit to the Pope. Afterwards, she was buried in the Church of Our Lady in Roermond.

== Marriage and children ==
In 1186, she married Otto I, Count of Guelders. Together, they had the following children:

- Henry of Guelders (d. 1198). He was betrothed in 1197 to Aleidis, a daughter of Dirk VII, Count of Holland. However, he died in 1198 before the wedding could take place.
- Gerard III (1185–1229).
- Adelaide (d. 1218), married William I, Count of Holland.
- Otto (1193–1213), was Bishop of Utrecht as Otto I.
- Irmgard, married Adolph, Count of Altena and Mark, son of Frederick I, Count of Berg-Altena and his wife Alveradis.
- Margaret, married Lothar III, Count of Hochstadt.
- Matilda, married Henry II, Count of Nassau.
