= House of Holland =

House of Holland may refer to:

- The House of Holland (nobility), rulers of the County of Holland in the Low Countries between the 10th and the 16th century
- House of Holland, a fashion label of Henry Holland (fashion designer), English fashion designer
