= Ada of Holland (abbess) =

Dutch abbess of Rijnsburg Abbey

- Born: 1208
- Died: 15 June 1258 (aged 49–50); Rijnsburg Abbey
- Other name: Lady of Rijnsburg

Ada of Holland (1208 – 15 June 1258) was a Dutch abbess of Rijnsburg Abbey from 1239.

Ada was born in about 1208 to Willem I, Count of Holland (c. 1168 – 1222) and Aleid van Gelre (c. 1178 – 1218). She first appears in written records in 1233 and in 1239 she moves from being a nun to being the abbess of Rijnsburg Abbey.

Because the abbey had been donated by her family she was allowed to be called the Lady of Rijnsburg. Problems arose in 1244 when her brother, Otto III van Holland, required that she should refer important decisions to him and other clergy and monarchs. She appealed to the pope, Innocent IV, who ruled in her favour. He confirmed her autonomy and also allowed the abbey the right to receive donations from novices entering the abbey.

Ada's authority was further undermined when her cousin sold the abbey and Ada was obliged to use her own money to repurchase it.

Van Holland died in Rijnsburg Abbey on 15 June 1258.
