= Floris the Black =

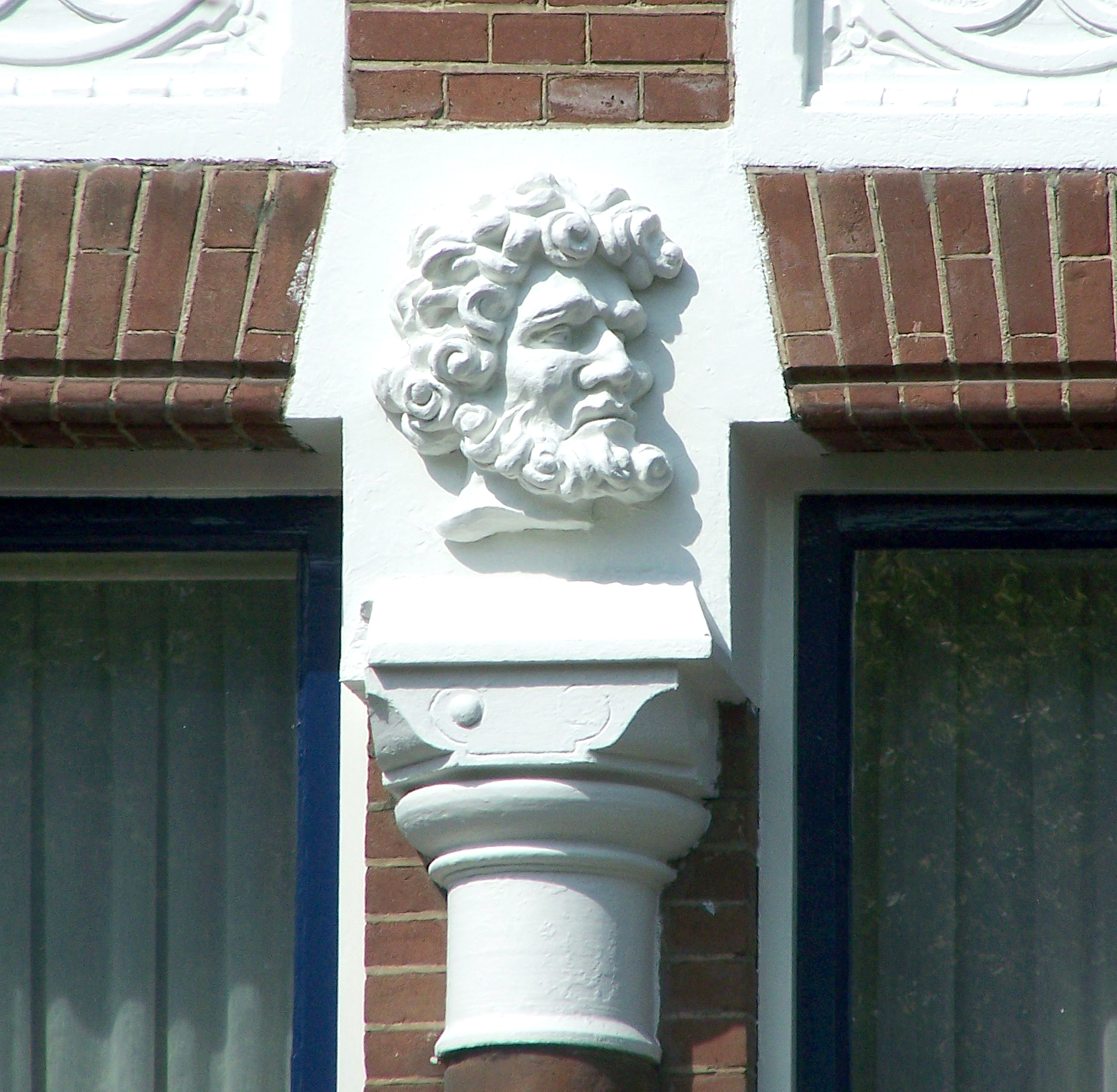
Floris de Zwarte Tolboom Mariaplaats Utrecht.jpg

Floris the Black was a son of Floris II, Count of Holland and Petronilla of Lorraine. He became a rebel count of Holland in the 1120s and 1130s, against the claim of his brother Dirk.

Floris openly revolted against his brother Dirk and was from 1129 to 1131 recognized as Count of Holland by, amongst others, King Lothair and Andreas of Kuyk, Bishop of Utrecht. After March 1131, Dirk again appears as count of Holland alongside him, the brothers apparently having reached an agreement. Only a few months later, however, in August 1131, Floris accepted an offer from the West-Frisians to become lord of their entire territory, which reignited the conflict with his brother. After this, the people from Kennemerland joined the revolt as well. A year later, in August 1132, King Lothair intervened and managed to reconcile the brothers. This did not pacify the Frisians however, who continued their revolt, which was nonetheless eventually suppressed.

Floris then departed for Utrecht, where he planned to marry Heilwive van Rode, a relative of the Bishop of Utrecht. On 26 October 1132, Floris was ambushed near Utrecht and murdered by Herman and Godfried of Cuijk, leaving Dirk to rule the county on his own. King Lothair punished this act by having Herman and Godfried's castle razed and banishing the two. Floris was buried at Rijnsburg Abbey.
