= Gerhart of Frisia =

9th-century Frisian count

Gerhart was a Frisian count from the 9th century. Friesland in that time was part of the Carolingian Empire and part of Middle Francia following the Treaty of Verdun. Gerhart was subject to King Louis the Pious and ruled the shire-county Westergoa. Hugo Jaekel used the Traditiones et Antiquitates Fuldenses, the Annales Fuldenses and other historical documents from the Abbeys of Fulda, Werden, and Corvey to hypothesize that Gerhart and the line of Counts of Friesland were descended from Redbad, King of the Frisians. Jaekel places Gerhart as son of Gerulf I of Frisia and father of Wigging. Gerhart likely held the title of Count of Friesland when his father was removed in 834 until 855 when Gerhart died. Shortly after Gerhart's death, his eldest son, Folkger, did not accept the title. Instead he donated some of his estates and entered Werden Abbey, leaving the remainder of his estates and the title of Count to Gerhart's second son, Wigging. Gerhart was likely married to the daughter of a Count in Hamaland, as evidenced by the similarity of his second son's name Wigging, to Wigmann who was a contemporary count in Hamaland, and because the family was recorded giving gifts in Hamaland to various abbeys.

Gerhart, his son Wigging, and other nobility from the region gave land and goods from several pagi of Friesland to the Abbey of Fulda.
