= Munsterkerk =

13th-century church in Roermond, Netherlands

Coordinates: 51°11′37″N 5°59′19″E

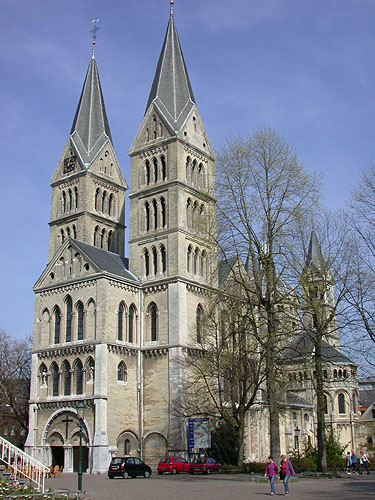
Munsterkerk in 2005

The Munsterkerk (Munster) is a 13th-century church dedicated to Our Lady in the Dutch town of Roermond. Its remarkable front towers are 55 meter in height. The Munsterkerk is one of the most important examples of Late Romanesque architecture in the Netherlands. The Roermond Minster is the only surviving part of an abbey, the rest of which was demolished in 1924. The church was renovated by architect P. J. H. Cuypers between 1863 and 1890; during this renovation, the two front towers were added while after a smaller baroque bell tower on the nave was removed, and the originally octagonal eastern towers were replaced by square ones. The renovation of the Roermond Minster was highly controversial, but Cuypers continued to renovate the Minster according to his plan.

In 1992, the church was damaged by an earthquake which destroyed the two eastern towers, which were rebuilt shortly after.

The church is a Rijksmonument, and is part of the Top 100 Dutch heritage sites.

== Burials ==
- Richardis of Bavaria
- Gerard III, Count of Guelders
- his wife, Margaretha of Brabant
