= Petronila =

Petronila may refer to:

- Petronila of Aragon (1136–1173), Queen Regent of Aragon (1164–1173)
- Petronila, Texas, a municipality in southern Texas
- Petronila Creek, a small river near Petronila, Texas
- Spanish frigate Petronila, a Spanish Navy screw frigate in commission from 1858 to 1863

== See also ==
- Petronilla
