= Floris II =

Count of Holland

Count of Holland
- Reign: March 1091 – March 1121
- Predecessor: Dirk V
- Successor: Dirk VI
- Born: c. 1085; Vlaardingen
- Died: 2 March 1121
- Spouse: Gertrude-Petronilla of Lorraine
- Issue: Dirk VI
- House: Holland
- Father: Dirk V, Count of Holland
- Mother: Othelhilde

Floris II, called Floris the Fat (c. 1085 – 2 March 1121), was the first from the native dynasty of Holland to be called Count of Holland, reigning from 1091 until his death.

== Life ==
Floris was the son of his predecessor Dirk V and his wife Othilde. Floris II ended the conflict with the Bishop of Utrecht (which he inherited from his father, and should be seen in light of the power struggle between the Pope and the Holy Roman Emperor), most likely by becoming his vassal. In 1101, he was endowed with the title of Count of Holland by the bishop of Utrecht, after acquiring the Rhineland (Leiden and surroundings) ('comes de Hollant', up until that time, the counts' dominion had been officially referred to as Frisia).

Around 1108, Floris II married Gertrude, the daughter of Theodoric II, Duke of Lorraine. Gertrude changed her name to Petronilla (after a saint venerated as the daughter of Peter), in recognition of her loyalty to the Holy See. Petronilla and Floris II had four children, three boys and one girl: Dirk, Floris, Simon and Hedwig, respectively. Dirk became his successor, Dirk VI of Holland, while Floris became known as Floris the Black and contested his brother's power.

Floris II House of Holland Died: 2 March 1121
Preceded by Dirk V	Count of Holland; 1091–1121	Succeeded by Dirk VI
