= Otto I (bishop of Utrecht) =

Dutch bishop

- Bishop of Utrecht
- Church: Catholic Church
- Diocese: Archdiocese of Utrecht
- In office: 1212–1215

Personal details
- Born: 1194
- Died: 1 September 1215 (aged 20–21)

Otto van Gelre (1194 – 1 September 1215) was bishop of Utrecht from 1212 to 1215.

Otto van Gelre was the son of Otto I, Count of Guelders and Richardis of Bavaria. He was appointed bishop at a young age with the support of Guelders and the Hohenstaufen. He was a loyal supporter of Guelder's interests in the Bishopric of Utrecht. He died at Voorthuizen at Elten, on the way to Rome.

Catholic Church titles
Preceded by Dirk van Are	Bishop of Utrecht; 1212-1215	Succeeded by Otto II van Lippe
