= Gerulf I of Frisia =

Gerulf I
- Count in Frisia
- Reign: around 839
- Successor: Gerulf II
- Died: past 865
- Issue: Count Gerulf II (c. 850 – 895/896); Count Gerhard; Gunther (d. 873), Archbishop of Cologne; The mother of bishop Radboud of Utrecht (d. 917)

Gerulf, also Gerulf the Elder, (d. after 865) was the first count of Frisia by this name and an ancestor of the Counts of Holland. Initially dispossessed for opposing emperor Louis the Pious, Gerulf was given back his lands in 839.

== Life ==
Gerulf was the son of count Dirk. In the times of emperor Louis the Pious he was count of Friesland as Louis' vassal, and reeve of the Frisians between Vlie and the river Weser. Already in the beginning of his reign, Louis, in an act of grace, had returned to the Frisians what they had lost earlier in their uprisings against his father. This act made the emperor popular among the Frisians but weakened the count's position towards the population. Later, Louis' weak policy against the Normans caused further annoyance in Frisia. In 826, he ceded a part of Frisia that was to be protected by the count of Friesland to the Danish pretender Harald Klak. Harald got the land of Rüstringen at the left bank of the Weser to have a refuge from hostile attacks by his kin. However, this was considerably interfering with the power of the counts of Friesland. It is presumed that in that time, Gerulf joined the opposition against the emperor.

A document by the emperor that was created on 8 July 839 in Kreuznach proves that there was an uprising in Friesland against the emperor. During the kinstrife between Louis and his sons, count Gerulf presumably took an active part in the movement against Louis, at the very least he lost his fiefs and his own estates were confiscated. On 8 May 839 after the reconciliation between Louis and his son Lothair, Gerulf's private properties were returned to him. The Kreuznach document mentions possessions of Gerulf in and around Leeuwarden and between Vlie and Lonbach.

It is assumed that Gerulf was related to the founders of Corvey Abbey. Furthermore, he may have married a daughter of Wala of Corbie.

== Issue ==
Gerulf I had the following children:

- Count Gerulf II (c. 850 – 895/896)
- Count Gerhard
- Gunther (d. 873), Archbishop of Cologne
- The mother of bishop Radboud of Utrecht (d. 917)
