= Petronilla of Lorraine =

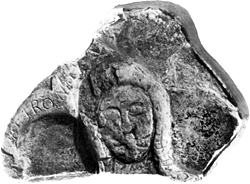
Engraving of Petronilla of Lorraine

Petronilla of Lorraine (c. 1082 – 23 May 1144) was Countess of Holland by marriage to Floris II, Count of Holland, and regent of the County of Holland during the minority of her son Dirk VI in 1121–1129. She was a daughter of Theodoric II, Duke of Lorraine and Hedwig of Formbach.

== Biography ==
Named initially as Gertrude after her maternal grandmother Gertrude of Haldensleben, she changed her name to Petronilla after her marriage to Floris II of Holland in 1100.

In 1121, after her husband's early death, she became regent for their son, Dirk VI. She is described as an ambitious and dominant regent who ruled with a "strong hand". In 1123–25, she gave military support to her brother the emperor in his struggle with his rival emperor Henry. After Baldwin VII, Count of Flanders died without heirs, she supported her son's claim to become Count of Flanders during the Flemish succession war of 1127, but Baldwin was eventually succeeded by Charles I.

Her mandate as regent formally expired when her son reached maturity in 1129, but according to contemporary Egmond chronicle, she remained de facto regent until 1133. In the struggle for power between Dirk and his younger brother, Floris the Black in 1129–31, she supported the latter upon his first attempt. In 1131, however, she retracted her support and refused to support him.

Petronilla founded Rijnsburg Abbey in 1133, where it seems that she retired from court and politics and spent the rest of her life. She was also buried there after her death in 1144. Petronilla descendant Ada was still in charge in the 1200s. She was abbess when her cousin sold the abbey and Ada was obliged to use her own money to repurchase it.

== Issue ==
With Floris II she had the following children:

- Dirk VI (c. 1115–1157)
- Floris the Black
