= Otto I of Guelders =

Count of Guelders and participant in the Third Crusade

Otto I, Count of Guelders
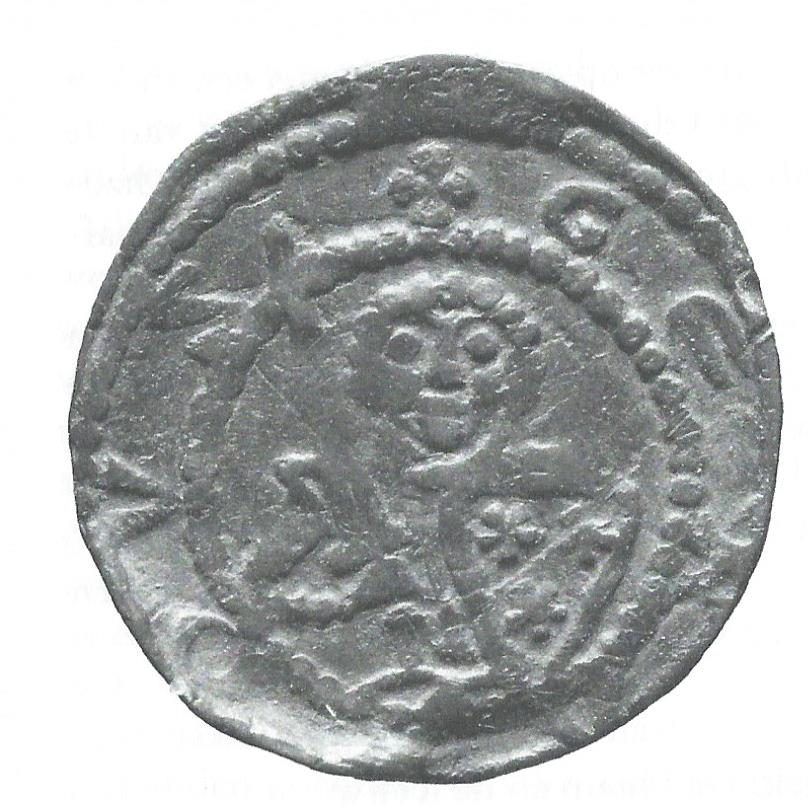
- Coin with Otto's coat of arms (1190)
- Tenure: 1182 - 1207
- Born: 1150
- Died: 1207 (aged 56-57)
- Noble family: House of Wassenberg
- Spouse: Richardis of Bavaria
- Issue Detail: Gerard III; Adelaide; Otto
- Father: Hendrik of Guelders
- Mother: Agnes of Arnstein

Otto I of Guelders (1150–1207) was a Count of Guelders and Zutphen from 1182 until his death in 1207. He was a son of Duke Hendrik of Guelders and Agnes of Arnstein. He married Richardis of Bavaria in 1184. Richardis was a daughter of Otto I Wittelsbach, Duke of Bavaria.

== Life ==
Otto I of Guelders joined his Emperor Frederick I Barbarossa on the Third Crusade (1189–1192) during which he aided the Crusader army in the taking of Iconium. After the death of Frederick I Barbarossa, some of the crusaders in the army left for home but Otto joined one of the groups that went on towards Syria and Palestine. After arriving in the Holy Land, Otto joined the army of Guy of Lusignan, the King of Jerusalem, who was besieging the city of Acre. Further hardships decimated the army of the late Frederick, and by the spring of 1191 most of them had left for home. Otto was the only survivor from the Low Countries, and returned home in 1190.

He is mentioned as the first Count of the combined area of Guelders and Zutphen in 1190. One of his sons was Otto, Bishop of Utrecht from 1212 until 1213.

== Family ==
Otto I of Guelders was a son of Duke Hendrik of Guelders and Agnes of Arnstein.

He married Richardis of Bavaria in 1184. Richardis was a daughter of Otto I Wittelsbach, Duke of Bavaria and Agnes of Loon. Otto and his wife Richardis had 7 children:

- Henry of Guelders (?–1198). Was betrothed to Aleidis of Holland in 1197, the daughter of Dirk VII, Count of Holland. Henry died in 1198, before the wedding could take place.
- Gerard III, Count of Guelders (1185–1229)
- Adelaide of Guelders (?–1218), married William I, Count of Holland
- Otto (1193–1213), was Bishop of Utrecht
- Irmgard of Guelders, married Adolf, Count of Altena and Mark, son of Frederick I, Count of Berg-Altena and his wife Alveradis
- Margaret of Guelders, married Lothar III, Count of Hochstadt
- Matilda of Guelders, married Henry II, Count of Nassau

Otto I of Guelders House of Wassenberg Born: 1150 Died: 1207
Preceded by Henry I	Count of Guelders; 1182–1207	Succeeded by Gerard III
