= William I of Holland =

Count of Holland from 1203 to 1222

William I
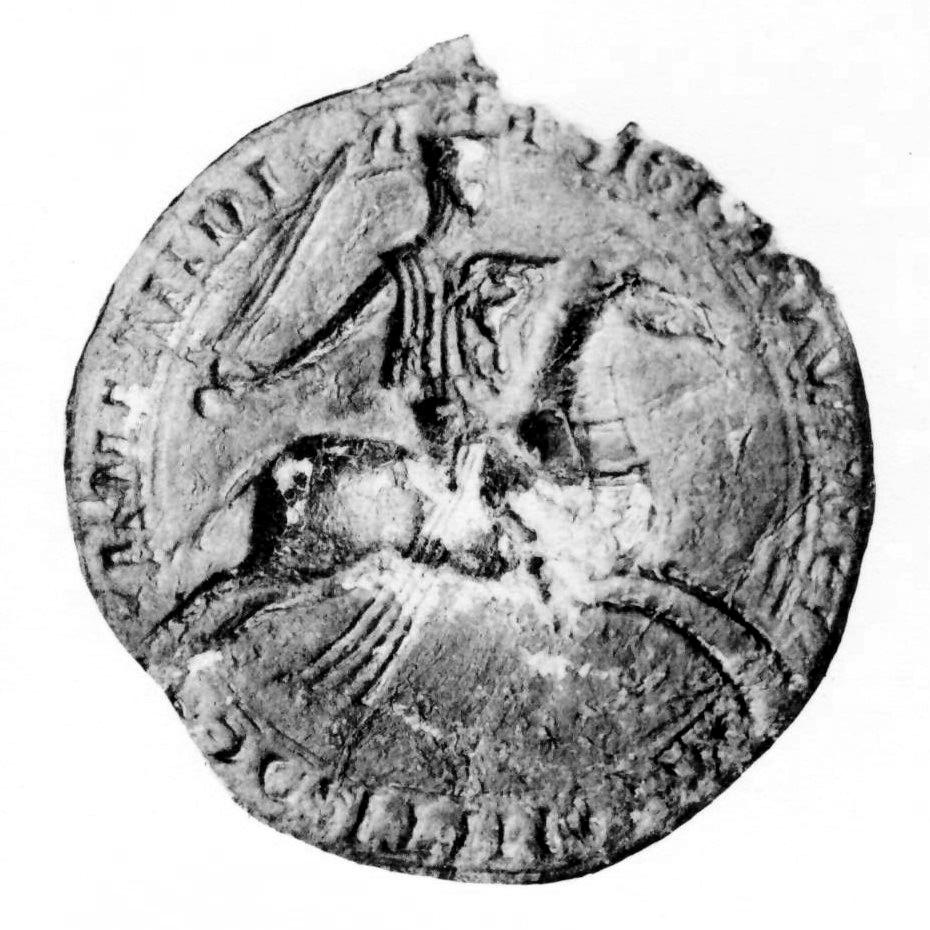
- Effigy of William on his seal

Count of Holland
- Reign: 1203 – 4 February 1222
- Predecessor: Ada
- Successor: Floris IV
- Born: c. 1167; The Hague
- Died: 4 February 1222
- Burial: Rijnsburg
- Spouse: Adelaide of Guelders; Marie of Brabant
- Issue and others...: Floris IV, Count of Holland; Otto, Bishop of Utrecht
- House: Holland
- Father: Floris III, Count of Holland
- Mother: Ada of Huntingdon

William I, or Willem I (c. 1167 – 4 February 1222) was count of Holland from 1203 to 1222. He was the younger son of Floris III and Ada of Huntingdon.

== Early life ==
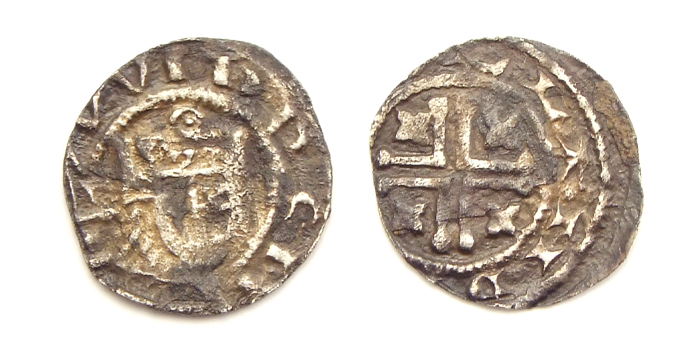
Dutch penny struck by William I (c. 1213–1222)

William was born in The Hague, but raised in Scotland. He participated in the Third Crusade under Emperor Frederick I alongside his father, Floris, and his uncle Otto of Bentheim. He started a revolt against his brother, Dirk VII and became count in Friesland after a reconciliation. Friesland was considered a part of Holland by the counts of Holland. His niece Ada inherited Holland in 1203, but William refused to accept this. After a war of succession, known as the Loon War (1203–1206), William won the county. Ada and her husband, Louis II of Loon, were supported by the bishop of Liège, bishop of Utrecht, and the count of Flanders. William was supported by the duke of Brabant and by the majority of the Hollanders.

== Countship ==
Emperor Otto IV acknowledged him as count of Holland in 1203 because he was a supporter of the Welfs. He and many others changed allegiance to Frederick II after the battle of Bouvines in 1214. He took part in a French expedition against King John of England. The pope excommunicated him for this. Possibly because of this, William then became a fervent crusader and by this his excommunication was lifted. He campaigned in Prussia. In Europe, he came to be called William the Crazy for his chivalric and reckless behaviour in battle. On his way to the Egypt, he commanded a joined force of Frisian, Dutch, Flemish and Rhenish crusaders that helped the Portuguese conquered the city of Alcácer do Sal from the Almohads as it is noted in the De itinere Frisonum and the Gesta crucigerorum Rhenanorum. William helped to conquer the city of Damietta during the Fifth Crusade.

There were great changes in the landscape of Holland in the end of the 12th and during the 13th century. Many colonists bought land to turn the swamps into polders. Most of the swamps had been sold, and irrigation had started during the reign of William. Huge infrastructural works were done; the island called Grote Waard was enclosed with dikes all around and a dam was built at Spaarndam. New governmental bodies were created, the so-called water boards, which were charged with the task of protecting the polders against ever-present threat of flooding. Count William granted city rights to Geertruidenberg in 1213, to Dordrecht in 1217, to Middelburg in 1220 and perhaps also to Leiden. In this way he gave an impulse to trade.

== Family ==
Count William was married twice. First, he was married in 1197 at Stavoren to Adelaide of Guelders, daughter of Otto I, Count of Guelders and Richarde of Bavaria. They had the following children:

1. Floris IV (1210 – 19 July 1234), who succeeded William I as count of Holland
2. Otto (died in 1249), regent of Holland in 1238–1239, bishop of Utrecht
3. William (died in 1238), regent of Holland in 1234–1238
4. Richardis (died in 1262)
5. Ada, abbess at Rijnsburg in 1239

Adelaide died on 12 February 1218 while William was away on crusade. In 1220 Count William married Marie of Brabant, widow of Emperor Otto IV.

Preceded by Ada	Count of Holland; 1203–1222	Succeeded by Floris IV
