= Dirk VI =

Count of Holland
- Reign: 2 March 1121 – 5 August 1157
- Predecessor: Floris II
- Successor: Floris III
- Born: c. 1114
- Died: August 5, 1157
- Burial: Rijnsburg Abbey
- Spouse: Sophia of Rheineck
- Issue and others...: Floris III
- House: Holland
- Father: Floris II
- Mother: Petronilla of Lorraine

Dirk VI (c. 1114 – 5 August 1157) was Count of Holland between 1121 and 1157, at first, during his minority, under the regency of his mother Petronilla. He was the son of Count Floris II. After his death he was succeeded by his eldest son Floris III. He married Sofie of Salm, Countess of Rheineck and Bentheim. She was heiress of Bentheim, which she ruled together with her husband and which was inherited by the couple's second son Otto after his parents' death.

== Petronilla's regency ==
When his father died in 1122, Dirk was only 7 years old and his mother, Petronilla, governed the county as regent. In 1123 she supported the uprising of her half-brother, Lothair of Süpplingenburg, Duke of Saxony against Emperor Henry V. After Lothair had been elected king of Germany himself in 1125 he returned Leiden and Rijnland to Holland, which had both been awarded to the Bishop of Utrecht in 1064 (Later on during Dirk's reign the wooden fortifications at Leiden would be replaced by a stone castle). Because Petronilla saw little ability or ambition in Dirk as he grew up, she stalled letting go of the regency when he reached adulthood (fifteen years old), until her favourite son Floris could attempt to take over the county.

== Floris the Black ==
This Floris, called "the Black" (Dutch: de Zwarte) did possess those qualities which his older brother seemed to lack. He openly revolted against him and was from 1129 to 1131 recognised as Count of Holland by, amongst others, King Lothair and Andreas of Kuyk, Bishop of Utrecht. After March 1131 Dirk again appears as count of Holland alongside him, the brothers apparently having reached an agreement. Only a few months later, however, in August 1131 Floris accepted an offer from the West-Frisians to become lord of their entire territory, which reignited the conflict with his brother. After this the people from Kennemerland joined the revolt as well. A year later, in August 1132 King Lothair intervened and managed to reconcile the brothers. This did not pacify the Frisians however, who continued their revolt, which was nonetheless eventually suppressed. Later that year, on 26 October Floris was ambushed near Utrecht and murdered by Herman and Godfried of Kuyk, leaving Dirk to rule the county on his own. King Lothair punished this act by having Herman and Godfried's castle razed and banishing the two. Floris was buried at Rijnsburg Abbey.

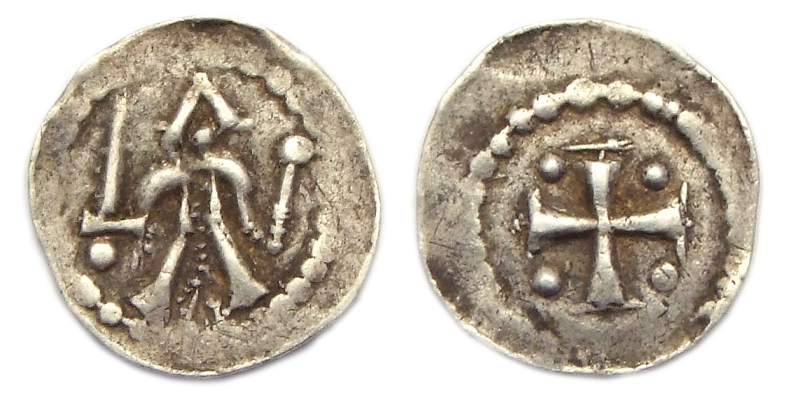
Holland, penny struck circa 1140 by Dirk VI, Count of Holland.

== Imperial affairs ==
Count Dirk had supported his relative Lothair of Saxony against Henry V and with his assistance parts of Holland were regained that had been awarded to and occupied by the Bishopric of Utrecht in 1064. Furthermore, with help from King Conrad III and support of the counts of Cleves and Guelders and his brother-in-law Otto II, Count of Rheineck, he was able to get a candidate of his own (Herman of Horne) recognised as bishop of Utrecht.

== Ecclesiastical affairs and pilgrimage ==
Dirk and his mother supported the abbeys of Egmond and Rijnsburg, which flourished in this period. The nunnery at Rijnsburg was established by Petronilla in 1133. Two of her granddaughters, Sophie and Hedwig later joined it, one of them as abbess.

Dirk and Sophie went on a pilgrimage to the Holy Land in 1138 and it was on this pilgrimage that their first son Dirk, called Peregrinus ("Pilgrim"), was born, but he died when he was only 12 years old. On the return journey, in 1139, Dirk visited Pope Innocent II and asked for the abbeys of Egmond and Rijnsburg to be placed under direct papal authority and this request was granted. In this way Dirk removed the Bishop of Utrecht's influence over those abbeys. Dirk's mother, Petronilla, died in 1144 and was buried at Rijnsburg.

In 1155 the Frisians revolted again and plundered the area of Santpoort nearby Haarlem, but they were beaten back by the knights of Haarlem and Osdorp.

In 1156 Count Dirk VI resolved the protracted conflict between the abbeys of Egmond and Echternach, which had been ongoing ever since the establishment of Egmond in 923 by Count Dirk I. At the time of the establishment the Count had granted Egmond the rights over all the churches in the area, which had previously belonged to Echternach. Repeated attempts were made to regain these lost rights, initially with little result, but in 1063 William I, Bishop of Utrecht, decided to split the rights between the two abbeys. This division was unacceptable to Egmond however, and its abbots pressed the counts for compensation. Finally, in 1156, Dirk VI resolved to give all the rights over the churches to Egmond again, compensating Echternach with the rights over the proceeds of the church in Vlaardingen and lands on the island of Schouwen. Although the abbot of Egmond was a witness at the agreement, it seems he may have attended under pressure, as only a little while later he excommunicated both Count Dirk and his son Floris. This perhaps is the reason that Dirk, unlike his forefathers, was not buried at Egmond, but at Rijnsburg.

== Family ==
Count Dirk VI married Sophie of Salm, Countess of Bentheim some time before 1137. She was a daughter of Otto of Salm, Count of Rheineck and Bentheim, son of Hermann of Salm, King of Germany. Dirk and Sophie had:

1. Dirk, known as Pilgrim (Peregrinus), born 1138/1139 – died 1151.
2. Floris, born ca. 1140 – died 1 August 1190 at Antioch (succeeded his father as Floris III, Count of Holland, in 1157).
3. Otto, born 1140/1145 – died 1208 or after, (inherited his mother's county and became Count of Bentheim).
4. Baldwin, born ca. 1149 – died 30 April 1196, (firstly, Provost at St Maria in Utrecht; secondly, Bishop of Utrecht from 1178 until his death).
5. Dirk, born ca. 1152 – died 28 August 1197 in Pavia, (also became Bishop of Utrecht, in 1197, but died the same year).
6. Sophie (in 1186 she became abbess of Rijnsburg Abbey, established by her grandmother).
7. Hedwig, died 28 August 1167 (a nun at Rijnsburg).
8. Gertrud (died in infancy).
9. Petronilla.

Also, it was alleged that Count Dirk had fathered an illegitimate son, whose name was Robert. (Note: M. Gumbert-Hepp, J.P. Gumbert, and J. W. J. Burgers show a Robert as a son of Dirk VI but do not mention illegitimacy.)

== Sources ==
- De Boer, Dick; Cordfunke, Erik (1995), Graven van Holland : portretten in woord en beeld (880-1580), Zwolle: Walburg Pers, pp. 29–30, ISBN 978-90-6011-915-0
- Dijkstra, B.K.S. (1991), Een stamboom in been, Amsterdam
- Gumbert-Hepp, M.; Gumbert, J.P.; Burgers, J. W. J., eds. (2007). Annalen van Egmond: de Annales Egmundenses tezamen met de Annales Xantenses en het Egmondse Leven van Thomas Becket. Uitgeverij Verloren. ISBN 978-9087040000.
- Dirk VI of Holland at www.genealogie-mittelalter.de

Preceded by Floris II	Count of Holland; 1121–1157	Succeeded by Floris III
