= Pernille Kaae Høier =

Danish actress (born 1991)

Pernille Kaae Høier (born May 9, 1991 Hørsholm, Denmark) is a Danish actress.

== Career ==
She got her first film role in 1998, in the film Når mor kommer hjem. In 2003 she played in Jesus & Josefine the leading part Josefine, for this role she became famous. The Christmas series is an Advent calendar, which was aired in Germany too.

In 2004 she acted in Skyggen i Sara and in 2005 she played in a sequel to the series Jesus & Josefine. This film, Oskar and Josefine, was distributed in Germany too.

== Filmography ==
- 1998: On Our Own (Når mor kommer hjem) - Julie
- 1999: Åh Yrsa og Valdemar - Yrsa
- 2003: Jesus & Josefine (Jesus og Josefine) - Josefine
- 2004: Skyggen i Sara - Sara
- 2005: Oskar & Josefine (Oskar og Josefine) - Josefine
- 2008: Patrol (Panser) - a Girl
- 2009: Store drømme - Episode 7: Nye veje at gå - Heidi
