= Otto III van Holland =

Catholic Bishop from 1233 to 1249

Otto III
- Bishop of Utrecht
- Church: Catholic Church
- Diocese: Archdiocese of Utrecht
- In office: 1233–1249

Personal details
- Died: 27 March 1249

Otto van Holland (died 27 March 1249) was a bishop of Utrecht from 1233 to 1249.

Otto was the second son of William I, Count of Holland and his first wife Adelaide of Guelders. He was elected as bishop in 1233, but because of resistance from the canons of Utrecht, his consecration was delayed until 1245. He emerged as a forceful ruler who involved himself primarily in secular affairs. After the death of his brother Floris IV, Count of Holland in 1234, he became guardian of Floris' son William II, Count of Holland, and he governed the County of Holland. He resolved the problems in Drenthe, problems which had cost his predecessor Otto II of Lippe his life. He also subjected the lords of Goor to his authority.

Catholic Church titles
| Preceded by Wilbrand van Oldenburg | Bishop of Utrecht; 1233–1249 | Succeeded by Gozewijn van Randerath |
