= Gerard III of Guelders =

Dutch noble

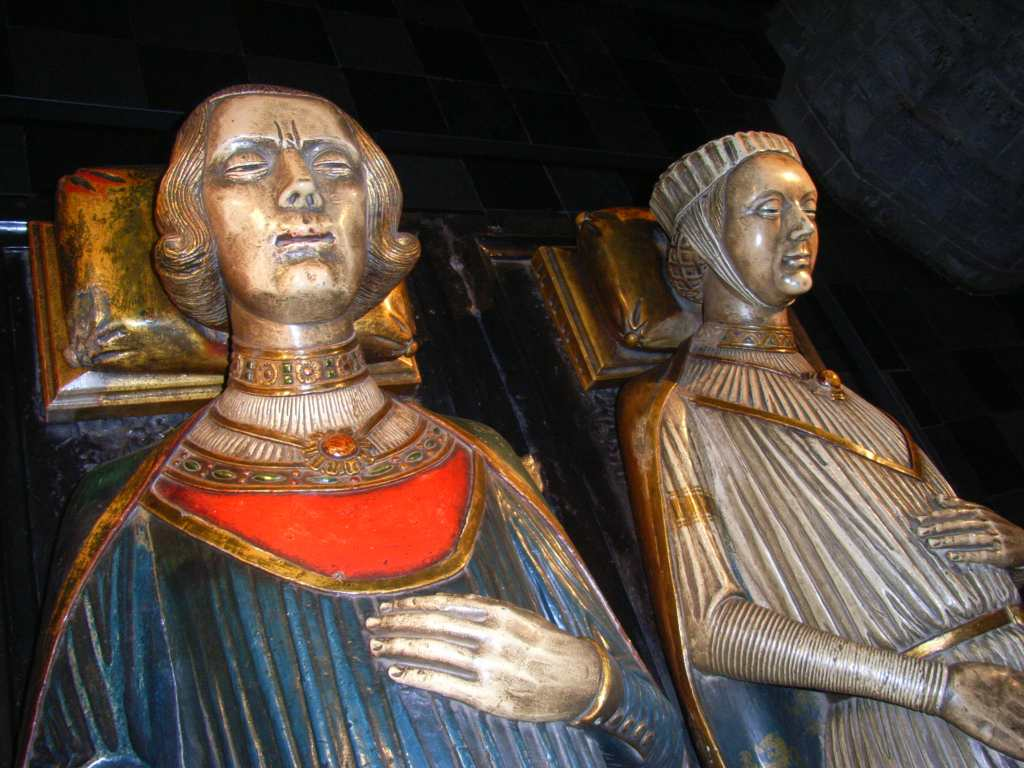
Gerard and Margaret's Tomb

Gerard III of Guelders (1185 – 22 October 1229) was the Count of Guelders and Zutphen from 1207 until his death in 1229. He was a son of Count Otto I of Guelders, and is sometimes called Gerard IV or Gerard V. Gerard married Margaretha of Brabant, the daughter of Duke Hendrik I of Brabant and Matilda of Flanders, Duchess of Brabant, in 1206.

== Life ==
Gerard was an influential knight in the court of the emperor Frederick II, but fell from grace and the emperor destroyed Roermond in 1213 after a conflict between them. He fought the Bishop of Utrecht Otto II of Lippe over Salland but supported the Bishop in the Battle of Ane. He was captured in this battle in 1227. The chronicle of Johannes de Beke mentions that Gerard was killed in battle. Another source mentions that Gerard was killed in a battle at Zutphen in 1229.

== Family ==
Gerard was a son of Count Otto I of Guelders and Richardis of Bavaria. He married Margaret of Brabant, the daughter of Henry I, Duke of Brabant, and Matilda of Flanders. They had:

- Otto II, Count of Guelders, married first Margaret of Cleves, daughter of Dietrich IV, Count of Cleves and his first wife, Mathilde von Dinslaken. Then married second Philippe of Dammartin, daughter of Simon of Dammartin, Count of Aumâle and his wife Marie, Countess of Ponthieu.
- Henry III of Guelders, Bishop of Liège
- Margaret of Guelders
- Richardis of Guelders, married William IV, Count of Jülich.

== Sources ==
- Baldwin, Philip B. (2014). Pope Gregory X and the Crusades. The Boydell Press.

Preceded by Otto I	Count of Guelders; 1207–1229	Succeeded by Otto II
