= Count of Holland =

Coat of arms of the counts of Holland

The counts of Holland ruled over the County of Holland in the Low Countries between the 10th and the 16th century.

== The Frisian origins ==
While the Frisian kingdom had comprised most of the present day Netherlands, the later province of Friesland in the Netherlands was much reduced. Already in the early Middle Ages West-Frisia (Frisia west of the Vlie) was not considered to be a part of Frisia anymore, and came to be known as Holland (present day provinces North and South Holland and Zeeland). Floris II was the first count who restyled his name from count of "West-Frisia", in count of "Holland".

Frisia Proper in medieval time therefore only included the middle and eastern part. The middle part (corresponding to the present day Dutch province of Friesland) was populated by free peasants who successfully resisted all attempts by feudal lords to subdue them, mainly the counts of Holland and the bishops of Utrecht. In the eastern part, local chieftains created their own states (within the Holy Roman Empire) in the late Middle Ages. They became a county after 1446 until 1744, after which it was incorporated within Prussia and later Germany.

== House of Holland ==
The first count of Holland, Dirk I, was the son or foster-son of Gerolf, Count in Frisia (Dijkstra suggests that Dirk may have been the son of a sister of Gerolf and that his own father died while he was still an infant). He received land around Egmond from Charles the Fat at a place called Bladella (modern-day Bladel near Eindhoven, The Netherlands) in 922. This is seen as the beginning of the county of Holland. However, until about 1100, the usual names for the county were West-Friesland, Frisia or Kennemerland; in spite of this the counts from Dirk I onwards are traditionally named of Holland.

Note that the chronology of the first few counts is uncertain. The existence of a count between Dirk I and Dirk II was only recently suggested, since it is thought that the references to counts named Dirk between 896 and 988 refer to three, not two, different counts. This third Count Dirk is placed between Dirk I and II and numbered as Dirk I bis to avoid confusion with the already established numbering referring to the other counts of Holland named Dirk.

The counts of West-Frisia ruled locally in the name of the archbishop of Utrecht, but over time, the counts of Holland came to dominate the bishopric of Utrecht. The archbishop of Utrecht governed the area on behalf of the Holy Roman Emperor, who saw his power diminished by the feudal system in which the counts and dukes ruled almost as sovereigns.

The counts of Holland tried frequently to increase their territory but apart from the acquisition of Zeeland during the 14th century they had no lasting success. Instead, it became a part of the mighty medieval dynasties' possessions, first Wittelsbach then Valois and thereafter Habsburg.

Name	Lifespan	Reign start	Reign end	Notes	Family	Image
Gerulf II	ca. 850 - 898 or 914 (ca. 48 or 64 years)	ca. 885	895/896	son or grandson of Gerulf I of Frisia, or the same Gerulf	Holland	Coat of arms of the Counts of Holland in use centuries later
Dirk I	ca. 875 - ca. 923 or 939 (ca. 48 or 64 years)	896	ca. 923 or 939	son of Gerolf?	Holland	
Dirk II	ca. 932 - 988	939	988	son of Dirk I; count of Frisia	Holland	
Arnulf	ca. 951 - 993 (ca. 42 years)	988	993	son of Dirk II; count of Frisia	Holland	
Dirk III: Hierosolymita (the Jerusalemite); Dirk III de Jeruzalemganger	ca. 982 - 1039 (ca. 57 years)	993	1039	son of Arnulf; count of Frisia	Holland	
Dirk IV	ca. 1015 - 1049 (ca. 34 years)	1039	1049	son of Dirk III Hierosolymita; count of Frisia	Holland	
Floris I	ca. 1025 - 1061 (ca. 36 years)	1049	1061	son of Dirk III; count of Frisia	Holland	

Name	Lifespan	Reign start	Reign end	Notes	Family	Image
Dirk V: Dirk V	1054 - 1091 (37 years)	1061	1091	son of Floris I; regents: Gertrude of Saxony (widow of Floris I), Robert the Frisian (second husband of Gertrude); count of Frisia	Holland	
Floris II: the Fat; Floris II de Dikke	ca. 1084 - 1121 (ca. 37 years)	1091	1121	son of Dirk V; first count who named himself count of 'Holland'	Holland	
Dirk VI: Dirk VI	1114 - 1157 (43 years)	1121	1157	son of Floris II	Holland	
Floris III: Floris III	ca. 1140 - 1190 (ca. 50 years)	1157	1190	son of Dirk VI	Holland	
Dirk VII: Dirk VII	ca. 1165 - 1203 (ca. 38 years)	1190	1203	son of Floris III	Holland	
Ada: Ada	1188 - 1223 (35 years)	1203	1207	daughter of Dirk VII; ruled together with Louis I; no issues	Holland	
William I: Willem I	1168 - 1222 (54 years)	1203	1222	son of Floris III	Holland	
Floris IV: Floris IV	1210 - 1234 (24 years)	1222	1234	son of William I	Holland	
William II: Willem II	1227 - 1256 (28 years)	1235	1256	son of Floris IV	Holland	
Floris V: Floris V, der keerlen god	1254 - 1296 (42 years)	1256	1296	son of William II; Floris de Voogd regent and guardian for Floris V (1256–1258)	Holland	
John I: Jan I	1284 - 1299 (15 years)	1296	1299	son of Floris V; John III, Lord of Renesse regent for John I (1296-1299); John II, Count of Hainaut inherited the county after John I's death	Holland	

== House of Avesnes ==
Name	Lifespan	Reign start	Reign end	Notes	Family	Image
John II: Jan II	1247 - 1304 (57 years)	1299	1304	son of John I of Avesnes and Adelaide of Holland, Adelaide is daughter of Floris IV; a.k.a. count John II of Hainaut	Avesnes	
William III: Willem III	1287 - 1337 (50 years)	1304	1337	son of John II	Avesnes	
William IV: Willem IV	1307 - 1345 (38 years)	1337	1345	son of William III	Avesnes	
Margaret I: Margaretha	1310 - 1356 (45 years)	1345	1354	daughter of William III; a.k.a. countess Margaret II of Hainaut	Avesnes	

== House of Wittelsbach ==
Name	Lifespan	Reign start	Reign end	Notes	Family	Image
William V: Willem V, Willem van Beieren	1330 - 1389 (58 years)	1349	1389	son of Margaret I; a.k.a. duke William I of Bavaria, count William III of Hainaut, count William IV of Zeeland	Wittelsbach	
Albert: Albrecht van Beieren	1336 - 1404 (68 years)	1389	1404	son of Margaret I; count of Holland, Hainaut, and Zeeland	Wittelsbach	
William VI: Willem VI, Willem van Oostervant	1365 - 1417 (52 years)	1404	1417	son of Albert; a.k.a. duke William II of Bavaria-Straubing, count William IV of Hainaut, count William V of Zeeland	Wittelsbach	
Jacqueline: Jacoba van Beieren	1401 - 1436 (35 years)	1417	1433	daughter of William VI; countess of Holland, Zeeland and Hainaut; a.k.a. duchess Jacqueline of Bavaria-Straubing; no heir; With Jacqueline's remarriage to the English Henry of Gloucester, title passes to the dukes of Burgundy	Wittelsbach	

There was a war of succession between uncle (John III, Duke of Bavaria) and niece (Jacqueline, Countess of Hainaut). This war was finally won by Philip the Good in 1433, who, in the meantime had inherited John's claims on the county. Philip and Jacqueline were double first cousins, Philip's mother is daughter of Albert while Jacqueline's mother was daughter of Philip the Bold of Burgundy. In April 1433 he forced Jacqueline to abdicate from Hainaut and Holland on his behalf.

== House of Valois-Burgundy ==
Name	Lifespan	Reign start	Reign end	Notes	Family	Image
Philip I the Good (Philippe III le Bon)	1396 - 1467 (70 years)	1432	1467	son of John the Fearless and Margaret of Bavaria, Margaret is daughter of Albert	Valois-Burgundy	
Charles I the Bold (Charles I le Téméraire)	1433 - 1477 (43 years)	1467	1477	son of Philip I	Valois-Burgundy	
Mary I the Rich	1457 - 1482 (25 years)	1477	1482	daughter of Charles I; countess of Frisia	Valois-Burgundy	

== House of Habsburg ==
- Maximilian (r. 1482–1494, regent), Holy Roman Emperor, husband of Mary I
- Philip II the Handsome (r. 1494–1506), King Philip I of Castile
- Charles II (r. 1515–1555), Holy Roman Emperor Charles V, King of Spain
- Philip III (r. 1555–1581, 1581–1598 titular only), King Philip II of Spain

During the 'foreign rule' by Burgundy and Habsburg, the county was governed by a stadtholder in name of the count. In 1581, the Estates General of the United Provinces declared themselves independent from the Spanish rule of Philip II (who was Philip III of Holland). Until the Treaty of Münster in 1648, the kings of Spain still used the title Count of Holland, but they had lost the actual power over the county to the States of Holland.

- Philip IV (1598–1621, titular only), King Philip III of Spain
- Philip V (1621–1648, titular only, renounced 1648), King Philip IV of Spain

== Aftermath ==
The county remained in existence as a constituent member state of the Dutch Republic until 1795. There were no more counts however since the Estates of Holland and West-Frisia were the sovereign of the county (although the countship was offered to William the Silent in 1584, shortly before his death). The stadtholders, who were servants of the Estates, were the de facto chief-executives during this period.

== See also ==
- A book of 32 plates of the counts of Holland published in Amsterdam in 1663, engraved by Adriaen Matham
