= Rijnsburg Abbey =

Benedictine nunnery in the Netherlands

Coordinates: 52.1896°N 4.4437°E

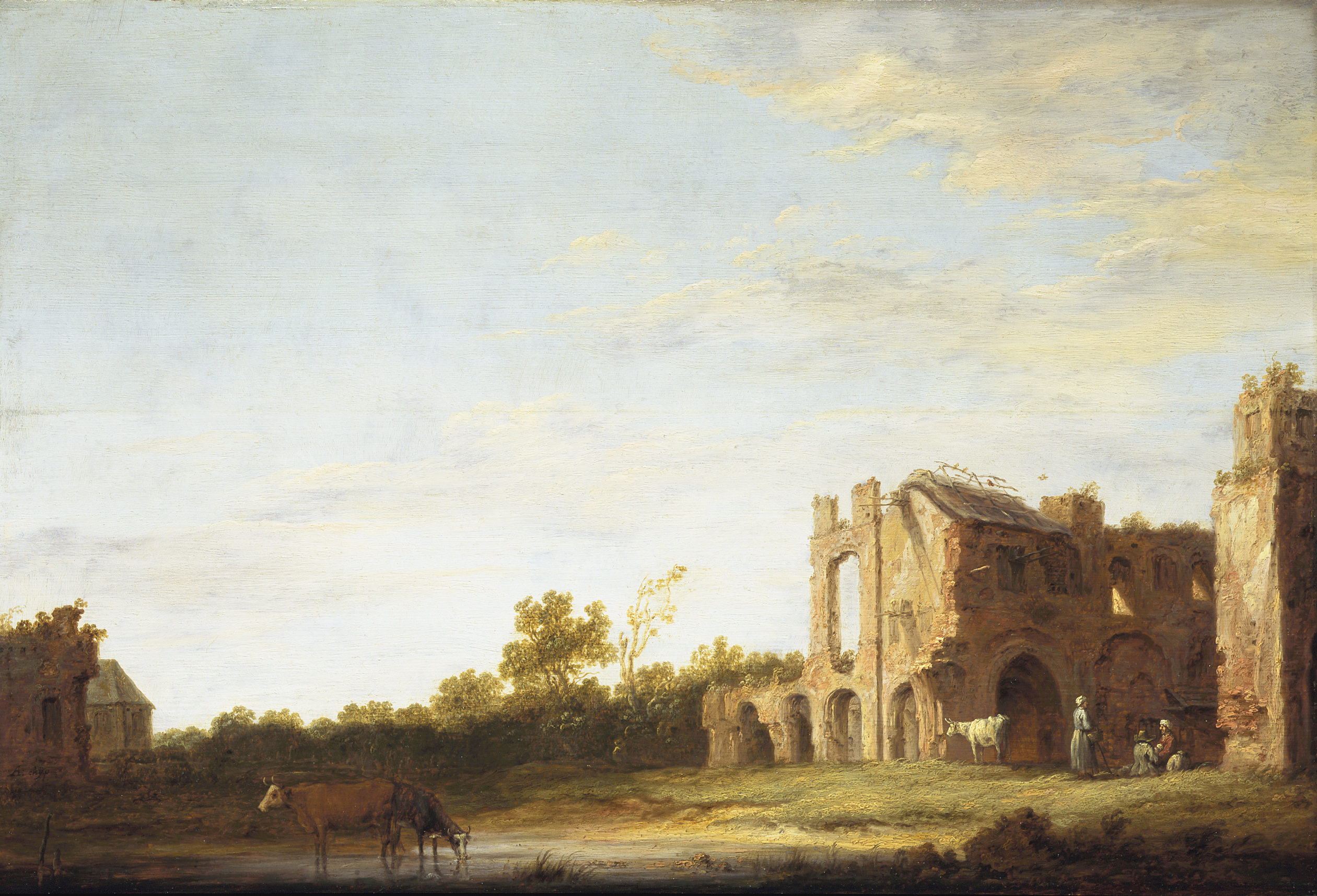
Landscape with the ruins of the Abbey of Rijnsburg (Aelbert Cuyp c.1640 - 1642)

Rijnsburg Abbey (Dutch: Abdij van Rijnsburg) was a Benedictine nunnery in Rijnsburg, Netherlands, active between 1133 until 1574.

== History ==
It was founded by Petronilla of Lorraine, regent of Holland, in 1133 and was thereafter under the protection of the countesses of Holland. The abbey only accepted female members of the nobility as members. It became the most prestigious women's religious house in Holland and grew very wealthy on donations during the centuries.

On the basis of the handed down liturgical manuscripts, it can be established that the Germanic liturgical practices were followed. There is almost no reason to assume that the abbey Rijnsburg or its mother house Stötterlingenburg in the Northern Harz have ever belonged to the order of Cluny.

It was pillaged and destroyed in 1574. In the center of Rijnsburg, as part of the current church, only one of the two towers of the Romanesque abbey church remains.

== Buried in the abbey of Rijnsburg ==
- Ada van Holland from Rijnsburg, abbess
- Count Dirk VI
- Count William I
- Count Floris IV
- Count Floris V

== See also ==
- List of abbesses
- Sint-Adelbert Abbey
- Abbey of Loosduinen
