= Petronella =

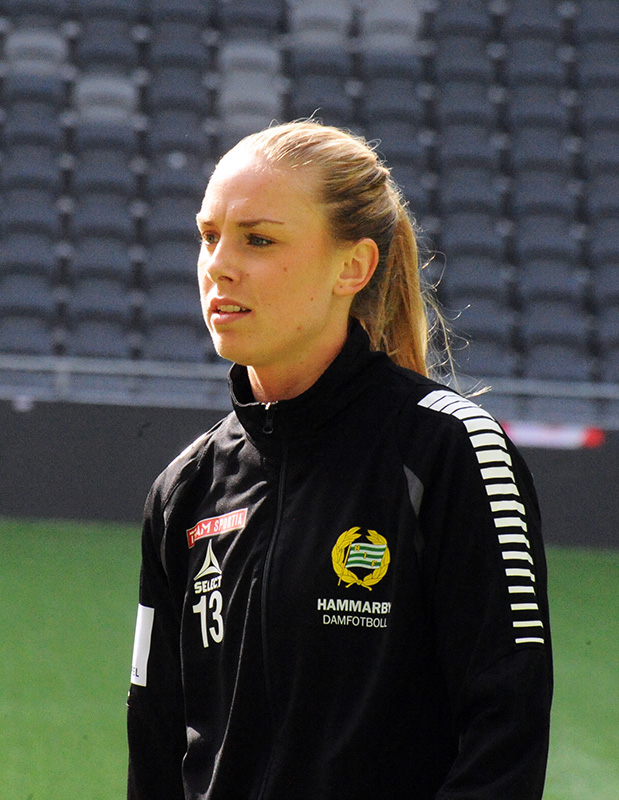
Petronella Ekroth

Petronilla is a Late Latin feminine given name. The name is a diminutive form of Petronia, itself the feminine form of Petronius, a Roman family name. Saint Petronilla is an early Roman saint, later interpreted as the daughter of Saint Peter. She became the patron saint of the Frankish kings, and her chapel became the burial place for French kings.

The derived form Petronella, later changed to Pieternella, has been popular in the Netherlands since the Middle Ages, perhaps due to Gertrude, Countess of Holland, adopting this name around 1100. In daily life, many people with this given name use a short form, like Pella, Petra, Nel, Nella, Nelleke, Nelly, Ella, Ellen, and Elly.

== People called Petronilla ==
- Saint Petronilla, venerated by the 4th century
- Petronilla (9th century), daughter of Hugh, son of Charlemagne, and purported mother of Ingelger of Anjou
- Petronilla of Lorraine (c. 1082 – 1144), Countess of Holland
- Petronilla of Aragon (1136 – 1173)
- Petronilla of Aquitaine (died before 1152)
- Petronilla, Countess of Bigorre (c. 1184 – 1251)
- Petronilla de Meath (died 1324), Irish maidservant executed for heresy

== People called Petronella ==
- Petronella of Coutrai (fl. 1200–1214), regent of Flanders
- Petronella Barker (actress, born 1942), British actress
- Petronella Barker (actress, born 1965), British-born Norwegian actress
- Petronella J.M.G. "Elly" Blanksma-van den Heuvel (born 1959), Dutch politician and banker
- Petronella T.M. "Ellen" Bontje (born 1958), Dutch equestrian
- Petronella Bos (born 1947), Dutch swimmer
- Petronella Breinburg (1927–2019), Surinamese British author, playwright and professor
- Petronella "Nel" Büch (1931–2013), Dutch sprinter
- Petronella Burgerhof (1908–1991), Dutch gymnast and Olympic gold medallist
- Petronella de la Court (1624–1707), Dutch art collector
- Auguste van Pels (1900–1945), called Petronella van Daan in Anne Frank's diary
- Petronella Duncan, South African politician and Member of Parliament with the Democratic Alliance
- Petronella Dunois (1650–1695), Dutch art collector
- Petronella Ekroth (born 1989), Swedish footballer
- Petronella F.C. "Nel" Garritsen (1933–2014), Dutch swimmer
- Petronella Huybrechtse (born 1972), Dutch sprinter
- Petronella de Jong (born 1970), Dutch Olympic sailor
- Petronella Kagonye, Zimbabwean politician
- Petronella Moens (1762–1843), Dutch writer, editor and feminist
- Petronella Muns (1794–1842), Dutch servant, one of the first Western women in Japan
- Petronella Oortman (1656–1716), Dutch art collector
- Petronella W.C. "Nelleke" Penninx (born 1971), Dutch rower
- Pieternella C. "Elly" Plooij-van Gorsel (born 1947), Dutch Member of the European Parliament
- Petronella van Randwijk (1905–1978), Dutch gymnast
- Petronella J. "Nelly" de Rooij (1883–1964), Dutch zoologist and herpetologist
- Petronella G. "Nel" Roos-Lodder (1914–1996), Dutch discus thrower
- Petronella Melusine von der Schulenburg (1693–1778), Countess of Walsingham
- Petra van Staveren (born 1966), Dutch swimmer
- Petronella Johanna de Timmerman (1723–1786), Dutch poet and scientist
- Petronella Tshuma (born 1990), South African actress
- Petronella van Vliet (1926–2006), Dutch swimmer
- Petronella van Woensel (1785–1839), Dutch painter
- Petronella Wyatt (born 1968), British journalist and author
- Petronella Zwier (1936–2001), Dutch high jumper

Fictional characters

- Petronella Osgood, a Doctor Who character
