= List of countesses of Hainaut by marriage =

== House of Hainaut, 1070–1280 ==
Picture	Name	Father	Birth	Marriage	Became Countess	Ceased to be Countess	Death	Spouse
	Ida of Leuven	Henry II, Count of Leuven (Leuven)	-	1084		1098 husband's disappearance	1139	Baldwin II
	Yolande of Guelders	Gerard I, Count of Guelders (Wassenberg)	-	1107		1120 husband's death	after 1122	Baldwin III
	Alice of Namur	Godfrey I, Count of Namur (Namur)	1112/14	1130		end July 1169		Baldwin IV
	Margaret I, Countess of Flanders	Thierry, Count of Flanders (Metz)	1145	April 1169	8 November 1171 husband's accession	15 November 1194		Baldwin V
	Marie of Champagne	Henry I, Count of Champagne (Blois)	1174	6 January 1186	17 December 1195 husband's accession	9 August 1204		Baldwin VI

== House of Avesnes, 1246–1257 ==
Picture	Name	Father	Birth	Marriage	Became Countess	Ceased to be Countess	Death	Spouse
	Adelaide of Holland	Floris IV, Count of Holland (Holland)	1230	9 October 1246	1246 husband's accession	24 December 1257 husband's death	1 March/7 April 1284	John I

== House of Flanders, 1257–1280 ==
- None

== House of Avesnes, 1280–1354 ==
Picture	Name	Father	Birth	Marriage	Became Countess	Ceased to be Countess	Death	Spouse
	Philippa of Luxembourg	Henry V, Count of Luxembourg (Luxembourg)	1252	1265	10 February 1280 husband's accession	22 August 1304 husband's death	6 April 1311	John II
	Joan of France	Charles, Count of Valois (Valois)	1294	19 May 1305		7 June 1337 husband's death	7 March 1342	William I
	Joanna, Duchess of Brabant	John III, Duke of Brabant (Leuven)	24 June 1322	before 27 November 1334	7 June 1337 husband's accession	26 September 1345 husband's death	1 November 1406	William II

== House of Wittelsbach, 1354–1432 ==
Picture	Name	Father	Birth	Marriage	Became Countess	Ceased to be Countess	Death	Spouse
	Maud, Countess of Leicester	Henry of Grosmont, 1st Duke of Lancaster (Plantagenet)	4 April 1339	1352	7 December 1354 husband's accession	10 April 1362		William III
	Margaret of Brieg	Ludwik I, Duke of Legnica-Brzeg (Piast)	1342/43	after 19 July 1353		26 February 1386		Albert I
	Margaret of Cleves	Adolph I, Count of Cleves (De la Marck)	1375	2 April 1394		13 December 1404 husband's death	14 May 1411	Albert I
	Margaret of Burgundy	Philip II, Duke of Burgundy (Valois-Burgundy)	October 1374	12 April 1385	13 December 1404 husband's accession	31 May 1417 husband's death	8 March 1441	William IV

== House of Valois-Burgundy, 1432–1482 ==
Picture	Name	Father	Birth	Marriage	Became Countess	Ceased to be Countess	Death	Spouse
	Isabella of Portugal	John I of Portugal (Aviz)	21 February 1397	7 January 1430	8 October 1436 husband's accession	15 July 1467 husband's death	17 December 1471	Philip I
	Margaret of York	Richard Plantagenet, 3rd Duke of York (York)	3 May 1446	9 July 1468		5 January 1477 husband's death	23 November 1503	Charles I

== House of Habsburg, 1482–1700 ==
Picture	Name	Father	Birth	Marriage	Became Countess	Ceased to be Countess	Death	Spouse
	Joanna of Castile	Ferdinand II of Aragon (Trastámara)	6 November 1479	20 October 1496		25 September 1506 husband's death	12 April 1555	Philip II
	Isabella of Portugal	Manuel I of Portugal (Aviz)	24 October 1503	11 March 1526		1 May 1539		Charles II
	Mary I of England	Henry VIII of England (Tudor)	18 February 1516	25 July 1554	16 January 1556 husband's ascension	17 November 1558		Philip III
	Elisabeth of Valois	Henry II of France (Valois)	2 April 1545	22 June 1559		3 October 1568		Philip III
	Anna of Austria	Maximilian II, Holy Roman Emperor (Habsburg)	1 November 1549	May 1570		26 October 1580		Philip III
	Elisabeth of Bourbon	Henry IV of France (Bourbon)	22 November 1602	25 November 1615	31 March 1621 husband's ascension	6 October 1644		Philip IV
	Mariana of Austria	Ferdinand III, Holy Roman Emperor (Habsburg)	24 December 1634	7 October 1649		17 September 1665 husband's death	16 May 1696	Philip IV
	Marie Louise of Orléans	Philippe I, Duke of Orléans (Bourbon-Orléans)	26 March 1662	19 November 1679		12 February 1689		Charles III
	Maria Anna of the Palatinate-Neuburg	Philip William, Elector Palatine (Wittelsbach)	28 October 1667	14 May 1690		1 November 1700 husband's death	16 July 1740	Charles III

== House of Bourbon, 1700–1706 ==
Picture	Name	Father	Birth	Marriage	Became Countess	Ceased to be Countess	Death	Spouse
	Maria Luisa of Savoy	Victor Amadeus II of Sardinia (Savoy)	17 September 1688	2 November 1701		c. 1706; County ceded to Austria	14 February 1714	Philip V

== House of Habsburg, 1706–1780 ==
Picture	Name	Father	Birth	Marriage	Became Countess	Ceased to be Countess	Death	Spouse
	Elisabeth Christine of Brunswick-Wolfenbüttel	Louis Rudolph, Duke of Brunswick-Lüneburg (Welf)	28 August 1691	1 August 1708		20 October 1740 husband's death	21 December 1750	Charles IV

== House of Habsburg-Lorraine, 1780–1795 ==
Picture	Name	Father	Birth	Marriage	Became Countess	Ceased to be Countess	Death	Spouse
	Maria Luisa of Spain	Charles III of Spain (Bourbon)	24 November 1745	5 August 1765	20 February 1790 husband's ascession	1 March 1792 husband's death	15 May 1792	Leopold I
	Maria Theresa of Naples and Sicily	Ferdinand I of the Two Sicilies (Bourbon-Two Sicilies)	6 June 1772	15 September 1790	1 March 1792 husband's ascession	1795; Conquered by the French First Republic	13 April 1807	Francis II

== House of Saxe-Coburg and Gotha, 1840–2002 ==
Picture	Name	Father	Birth	Marriage	Became Countess	Ceased to be Countess	Death	Spouse
Vacant under Prince Baudouin who was only a child when he held the title. Title Abolished in 2002.

== See also ==
- Countess of Flanders
- Countess of Holland
- Countess of Zeeland
- List of Bavarian consorts
- List of Dutch consorts
