= Montécu =

Former municipality, canton of Fribourg

- Former municipality
- Coat of arms
- Location of Montécu
- Location within Switzerland Location within Canton of Fribourg
- Coordinates: 46.7409°N 7.1946°E
- Country: Switzerland
- Canton: Fribourg
- District: Sarine
- Municipality: Le Mouret

Population (1988)
  - Total: 167
- Time zone: UTC+01:00 (CET)
  - Summer (DST): UTC+02:00 (CEST)
- SFOS number: 2209
- ISO 3166 code: CH-FR
- Website

Montécu is a former municipality in the Sarine district of the canton of Fribourg, Switzerland. In 1989 it merged with Bonnefontaine, and since 2003 it has been part of the municipality of Le Mouret. From 1884 to 1982 Montécu was administratively linked to Bonnefontaine.

== History ==
Montécu is first mentioned in 1285 as Monticum. The great hospital (grand hôpital) of Fribourg held feudal rights there. Montécu was part of the Old Lands (Anciennes Terres), in the banner (bannière) of the Bourg, until 1798, of the district of La Roche until 1803 and of that of Fribourg until 1848.

In church matters Montécu belonged to the parish of Ependes, from 1644 to that of Praroman and from 1898 to that of Bonnefontaine. It is an agricultural village whose main resource is cattle breeding.

Montécu had 41 inhabitants in 1811, 48 in 1850, 71 in 1900, 96 in 1930, 77 in 1950, 142 in 1980 and 167 in 1988.

== Bibliography ==
- A. Carrel, Montécu, manuscript, Collège Saint-Michel, Fribourg, 1983–1984
- B. Dafflon, Etude en vue de la fusion des communes de Bonnefontaine et Montécu, 1987
