= Essert, Switzerland =

Former municipality, canton of Fribourg

Essert
- Former municipality
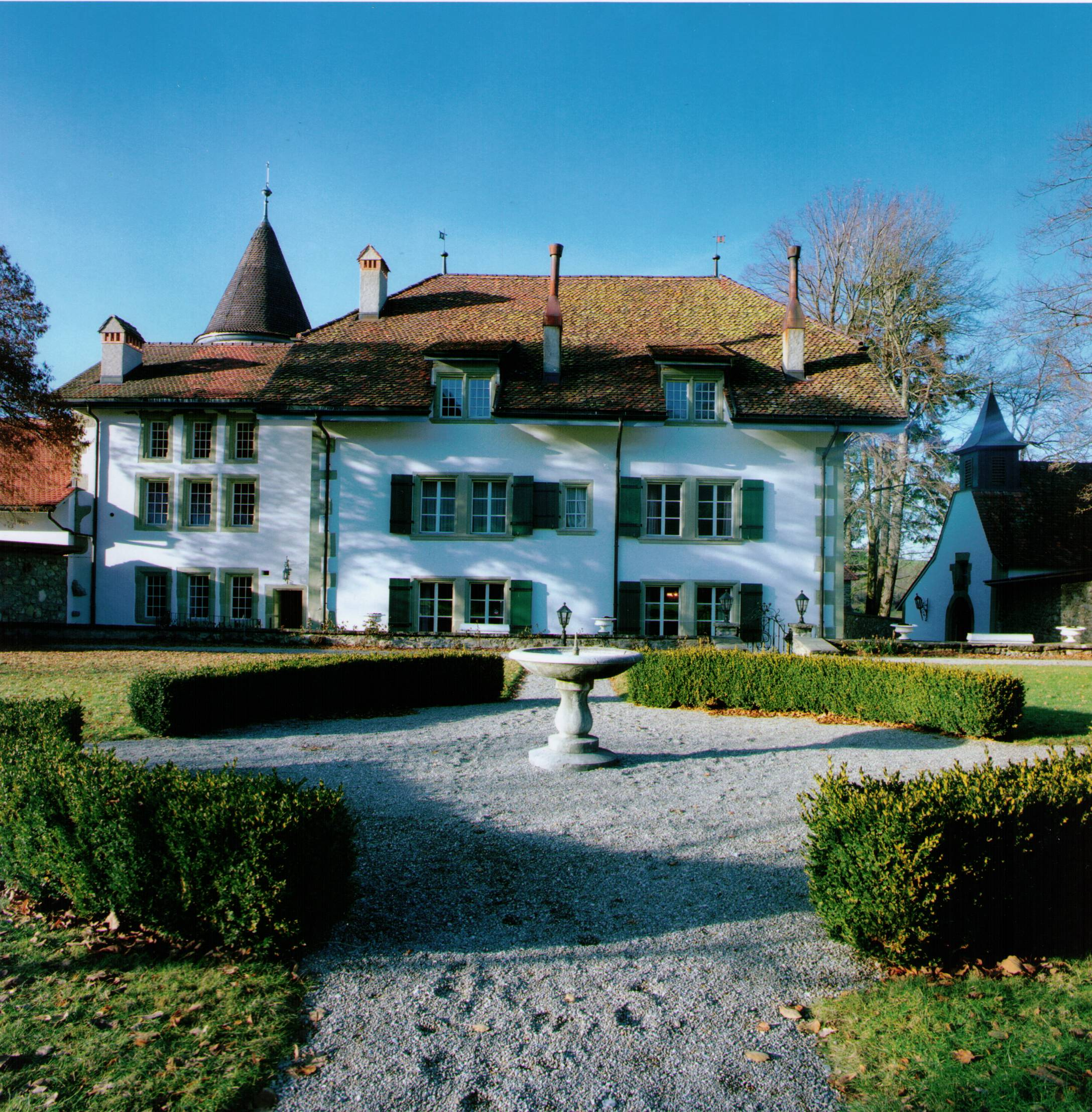
- Château de la Grande Riedera

- Coat of arms
- Location of Essert
- Location within Switzerland Location within Canton of Fribourg
- Coordinates: 46.7378°N 7.1634°E
- Country: Switzerland
- Canton: Fribourg
- District: Sarine
- Municipality: Le Mouret

Population (2000)
  - Total: 253
- Time zone: UTC+01:00 (CET)
  - Summer (DST): UTC+02:00 (CEST)
- SFOS number: 2190
- ISO 3166 code: CH-FR
- Website

Essert (former German name Ried) is a former municipality in the Sarine district of the canton of Fribourg, Switzerland. In 2003 it merged with Bonnefontaine, Montévraz, Oberried, Praroman and Zénauva to form the municipality of Le Mouret.

== History ==
Essert is first mentioned in 1180 as Esserz. In 1269 the tithe of the village and territory of Essert was owed to Hauterive Abbey. The great hospital (grand hôpital) of Fribourg and the parish of Treyvaux also collected dues there. Essert was part of the Old Lands (Anciennes Terres) from the 15th century until 1798, then of the district of La Roche and, from 1803 to 1848, of that of Fribourg.

In church matters Essert belonged to the parish of Treyvaux. Its chapel, dedicated to Saint Anne and Saint George, was built in 1526. The 17th-century Château de la Grande Riedera has a chapel dedicated to Saint Tobias and Saint Catherine (1639); since 1990 the château has been the seat of the Monique Pobé cultural foundation. Straw plaiting was practiced until the end of the 19th century. Agriculture consists of livestock farming and cereal and fodder crops.

Essert had 127 inhabitants in 1811, 192 in 1870, 171 in 1900, 237 in 1950 and 253 in 2000.

== Bibliography ==
- La Liberté, 21 August 1956
- J. Jenny, Notice historique sur la paroisse de Treyvaux-Essert, à l'occasion du centenaire de l'église paroissiale, 1974
