= Zénauva =

Former municipality, canton of Fribourg

- Former municipality
- Coat of arms
- Location of Zénauva
- Location within Switzerland Location within Canton of Fribourg
- Coordinates: 46.733333°N 7.183334°E
- Country: Switzerland
- Canton: Fribourg
- District: Sarine
- Municipality: Le Mouret

Population (2000)
  - Total: 121
- Time zone: UTC+01:00 (CET)
  - Summer (DST): UTC+02:00 (CEST)
- SFOS number: 2232
- ISO 3166 code: CH-FR
- Website

Zénauva (former German name Schenof) is a village and former municipality in the Sarine district of the canton of Fribourg, Switzerland. In 2003 it merged with Bonnefontaine, Essert, Montévraz, Oberried and Praroman to form the municipality of Le Mouret. The village lies at the foot of the Cousimbert, to which a mountain road connects it.

== History ==
Zénauva is first mentioned in 1217 as Chinova and in 1755 as Zennauve; the form Chenauvaz was still in use in the 19th century. In the Middle Ages Hauterive Abbey held property in Zénauva. The village was part of the Old Lands (Anciennes Terres), in the banner (bannière) of the Bourg, from 1442 at the latest, of the district of La Roche from 1798 and then of that of Fribourg from 1803 to 1848.

After belonging to the parish of Ependes, Zénauva was attached to that of Praroman in 1644. It is part of the school district (cercle scolaire) of Le Mouret; the schoolhouse from the end of the 19th century is no longer used as a school. At the beginning of the 21st century the village kept its rural character, with livestock farming and fodder crops.

Zénauva had 65 inhabitants in 1811, 44 in 1850, 74 in 1870, 87 in 1900, 107 in 1910, 83 in 1950 and 121 in 2000.

== Bibliography ==
- Le Mouret, 2007
