= Te Riviere Castle =

- Huis te Riviere, Huis Mathenesse
- Broersvest Schiedam, the Netherlands
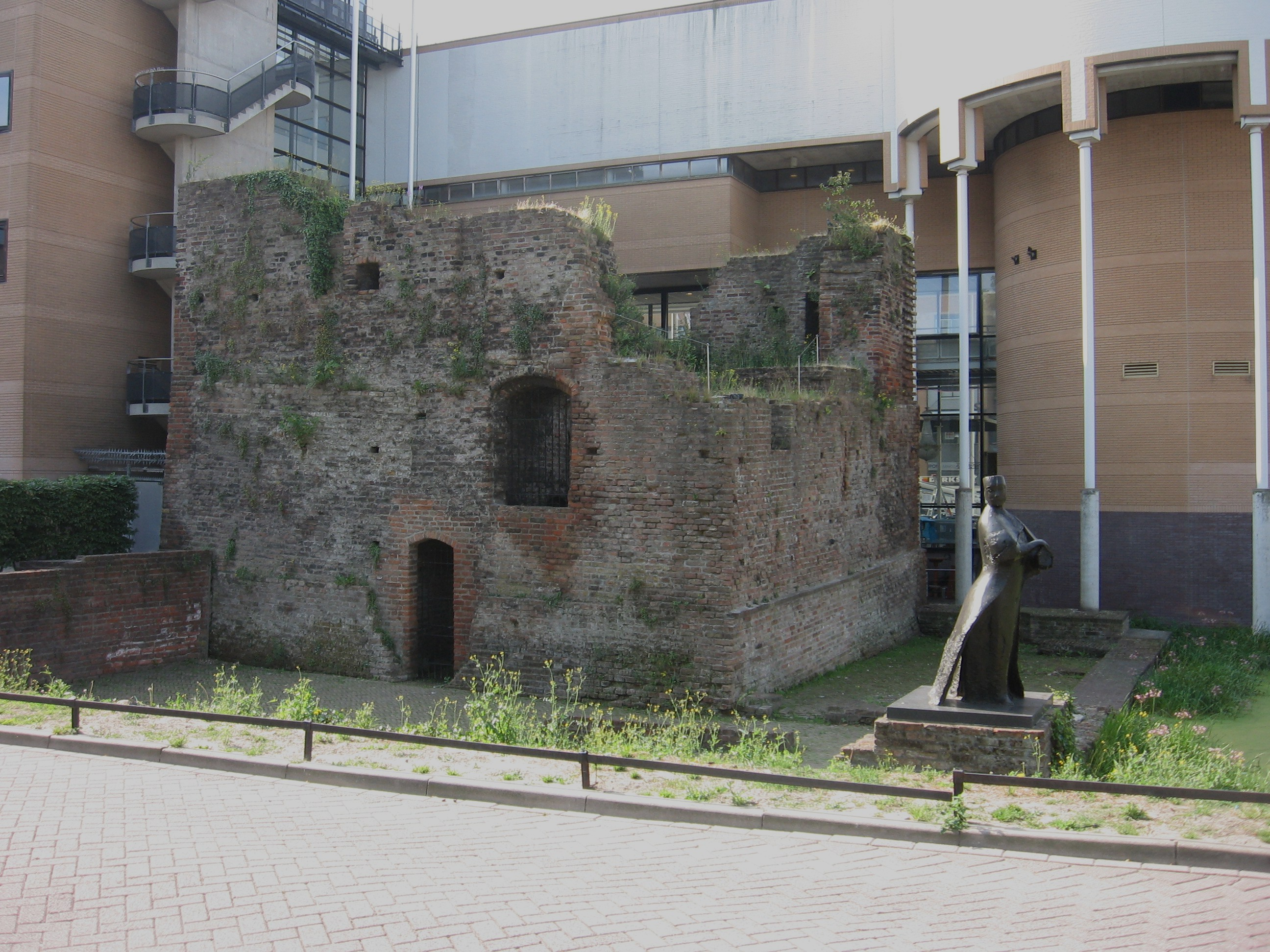
- Keep of the ruins of Te Riviere Castle

Site information
- Type: Castle
- Open to the public: No
- Condition: Ruin

Location
- Coordinates: 51.918177°N 4.402936°E

Site history
- Built: 1262
- Materials: Brick
- Events: Siege of 1351

Te Riviere Castle (also known as Huis Mathenesse) is a ruinous castle located in Schiedam, Netherlands.

== Location and Name ==
=== Location ===
The first reference to the place was in 1268 as Woninghe ter Nieuwer Schie (House on the new Schie). The new Schie was the extension of the Schie now known as Schiedamse Schie. At its confluence with the Nieuwe Maas, Schiedam was built. At the time the branches of the Schie to Rotterdam and Delfshaven did not yet exist. Therefore the preferred route for traffic to Delft and further on to Leiden and Haarlem passed along the site of the castle.

=== Names ===
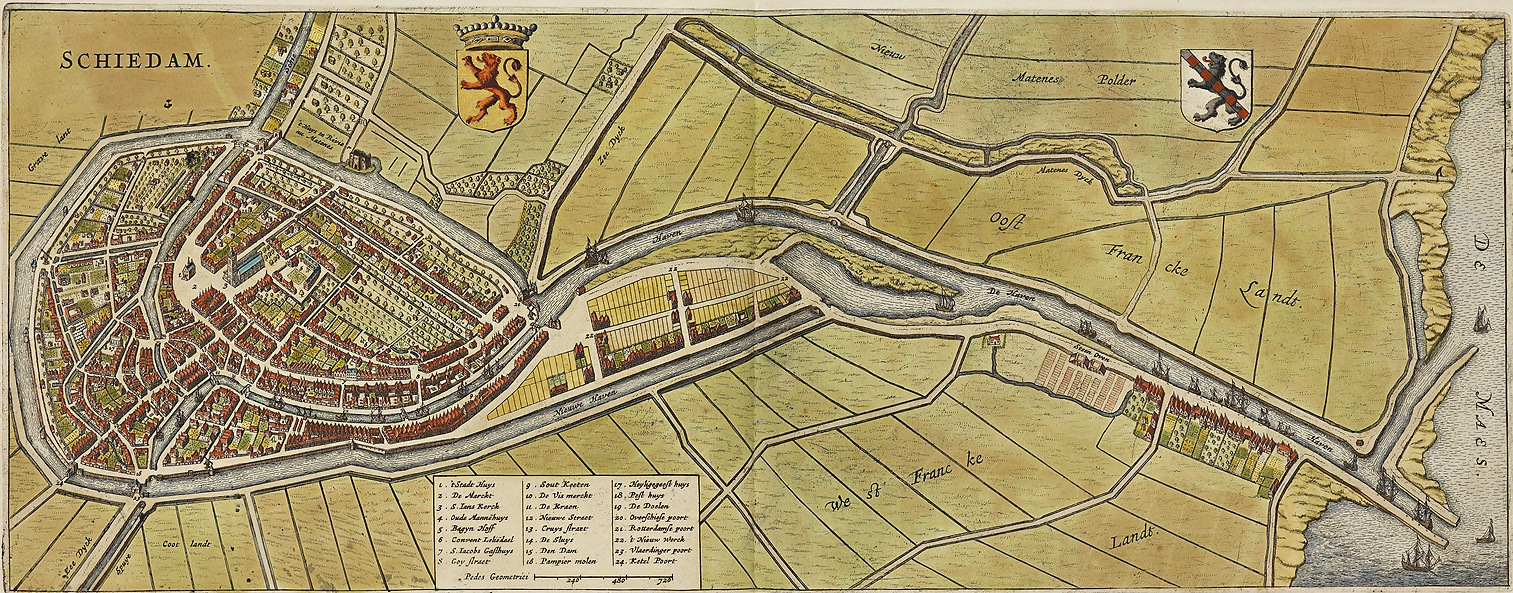
'Huis te Rivier now Matenes' on a 1698 map

The castle's current name Huis te Riviere (house on the river) sounds suspiciously romantic, but was actually the first accepted name of the castle in medieval times. At the time, and in its context, 'house' meant a type of castle. The river was the river Merwede. After the Old Rhine had been diverted near Wijk bij Duurstede in 1122, the Lek became its main bed. The Lek now flows into the Nieuwe Maas, but in medieval times this was known as Merwede. The current Nieuwe Maas is only fed by the Rhine. Its shore is now about 1.5 km south of the castle, but this reroute of its bed already started in the 13th century.

The castle is also known as Huis Mat(h)enesse. Matenesse was the name of a nearby polder and lordship. Lord Dirk of Matenesse acquired the castle (Burch) known as House te Riviere in 1339. The castle then took the name of its proprietor.

== Castle Characteristics ==
=== The 1574 castle ===
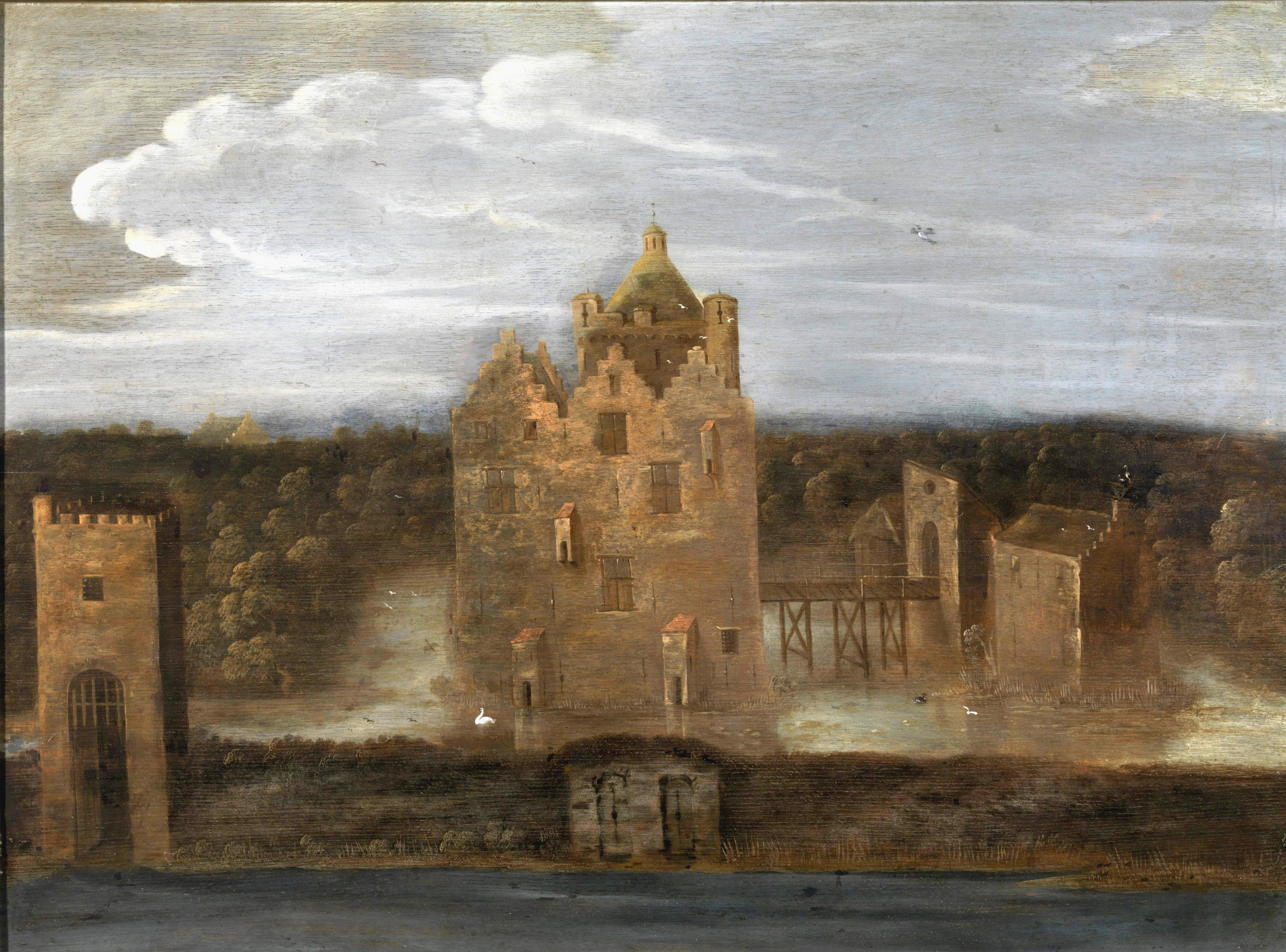
Western façade before 1574

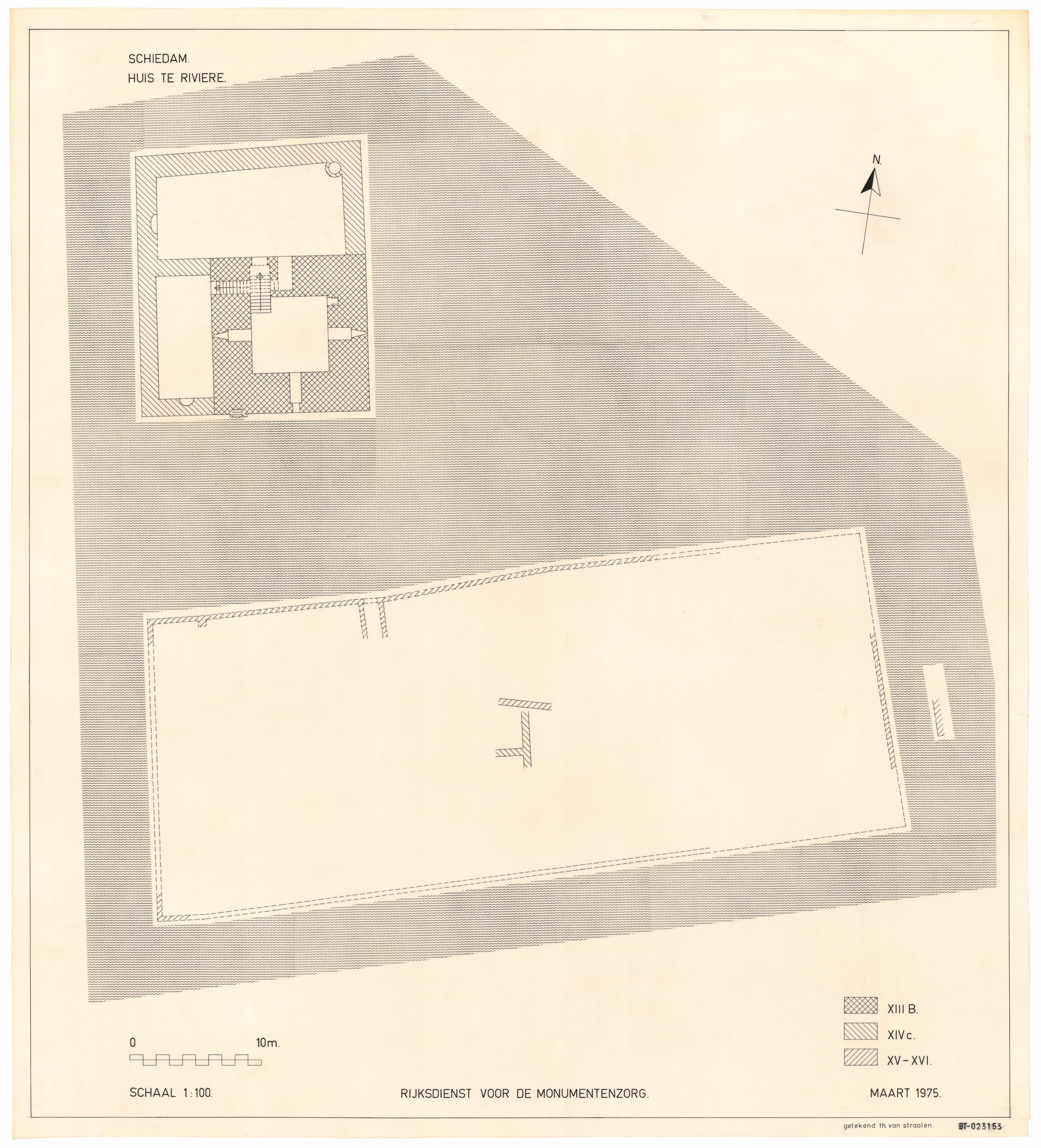
Floor plan of the 1574 situation.

The current Te Riviere Castle consists of the remains of the castle as it was when it was destroyed in 1574. A painting from around 1574 shows its earlier appearance. The current ruins consist of a 20 by 17.5 m area. On it are the lower part of a tower house and the foundations of some walls.

The base of the tower house measures 12 by 12 meters. The wing north of it measures 8 by 17.5 m. The remaining southwestern space measured 12.5 by 5.5 m. In an investigation, Dutch archaeologist Jaap Renaud concluded that the small west side of the northern wing had a stepped gable, and that the remaining southwestern part was divided in two, and got two west-facing stepped gables, leading to a consistency between the painting, and the archaeological evidence. Renaud concluded that the painting indeed reflected the 1574 appearance.

Renaud also stated that the castle would have been a very exceptional construction if the 1574 situation had been the result of the original plans for the castle. The 1947–1948 excavations that Renaud led, allowed him to draw a floor plan of the tower house and part of the 1574 outer bailey. This solved the very important question whether the old painting reflected the pre-1574 situation.

In the context of investigating the relation between the picture and archaeology, Renaud then did something that was scientifically correct, but would later be proven wrong. With respect to the northern wall of the outer bailey, he concluded that this was a replacement of a wall from 1300. For Renaud, Te Riviere was a small castle with an outer bailey, comparable to Middelburg Castle near Alkmaar. However, subsequent archaeological research would lead to very different conclusions.

=== A formidable square castle ===
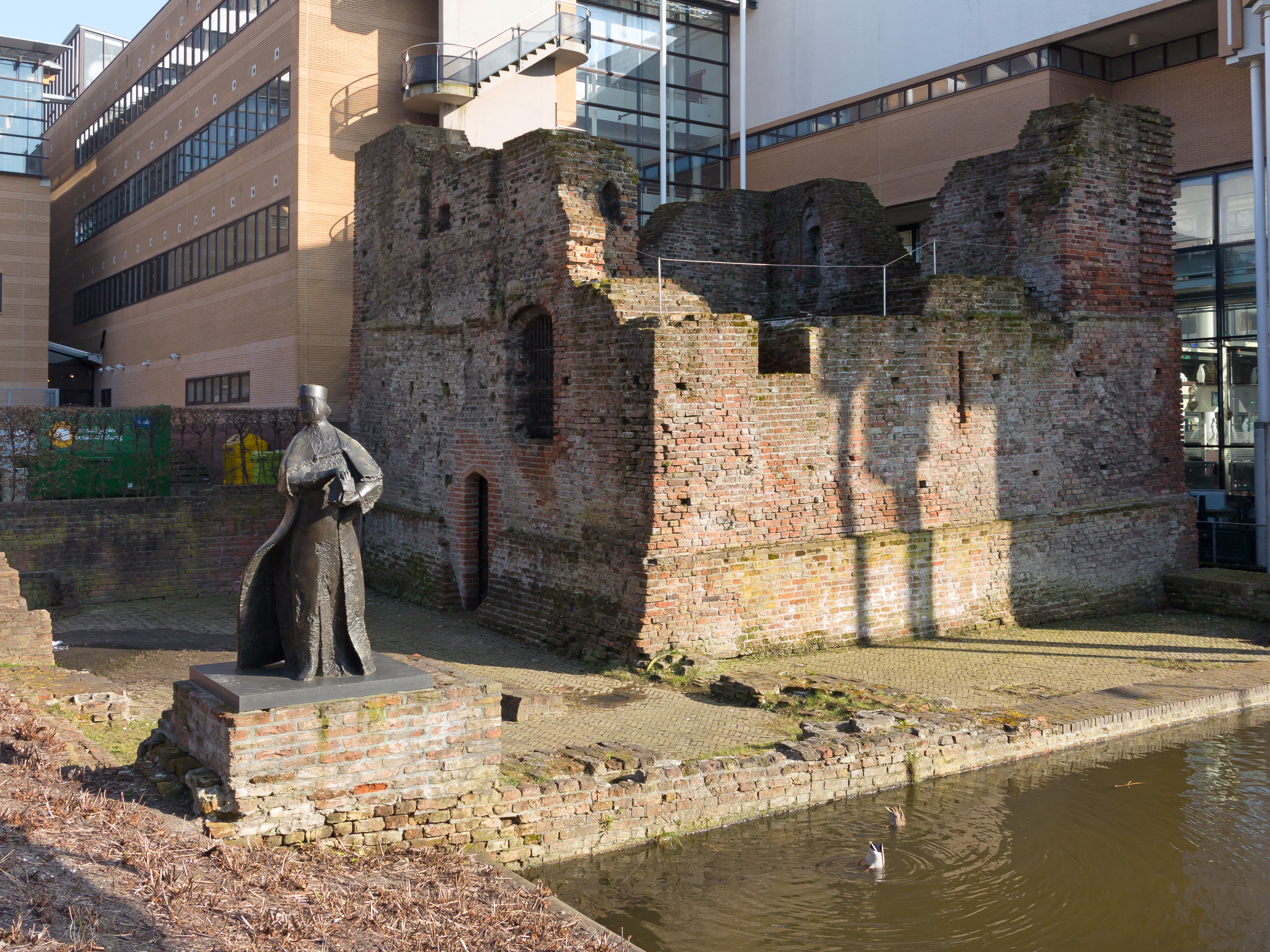
The wall along the water shows remains of the buttresses of the enceinte

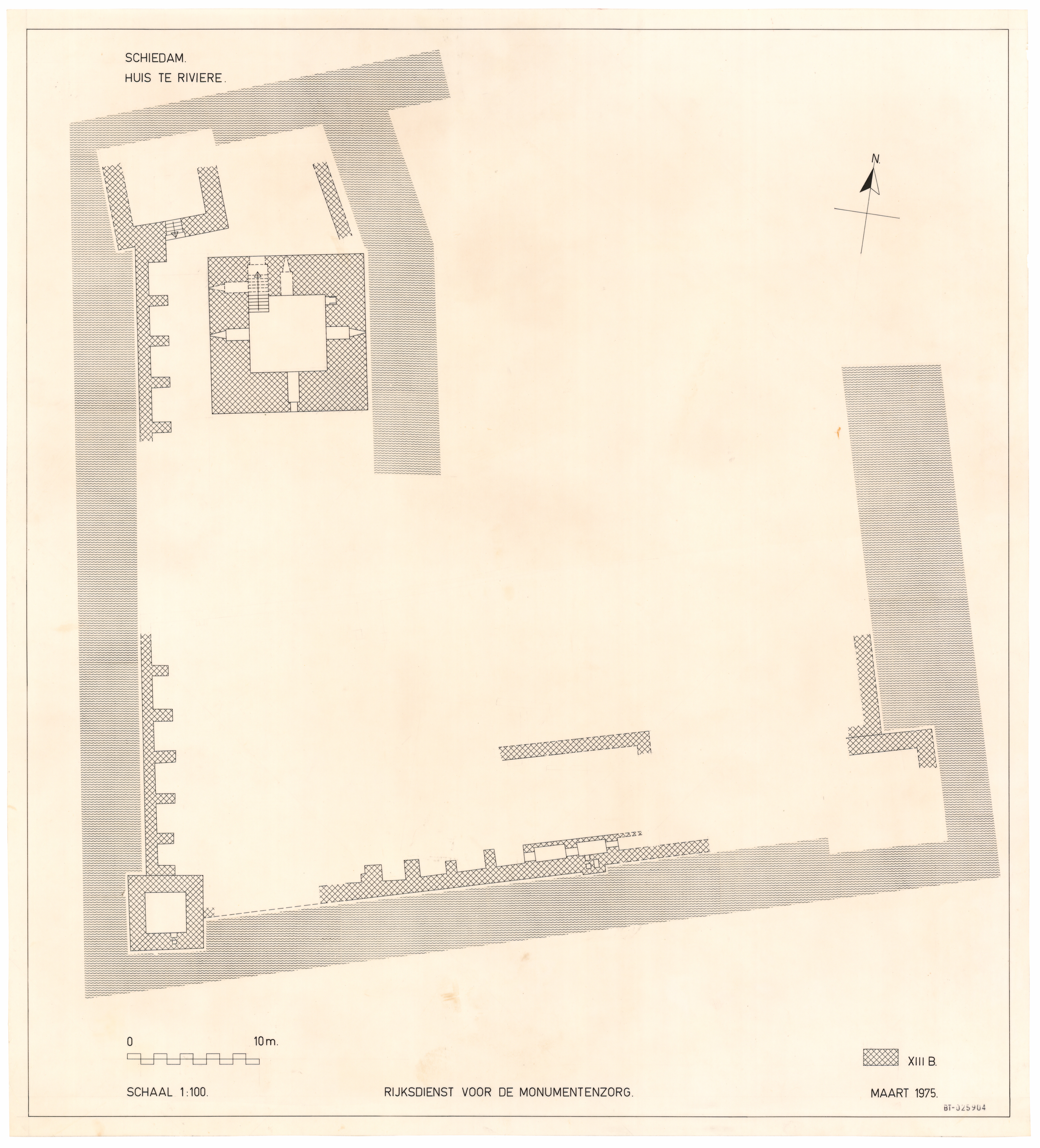
1975 map of second half XIIIth century situation

The current ruins show the remains of an enceinte with buttresses on the inside at a very small distance from the main tower house. This wall was also found on the western side of the supposed outer bailey. It was even known that the wall extended into the moat a bit from the 'keep'. The supposition that it had formed one continuous wall would seem obvious, but it was not. The construction date of Te Riviere Castle lay before the date that the square castle type appeared in Holland, and it would lead to a very large castle suddenly appearing in the history of Holland.

The theory that the oldest castle had been a formidable square castle became logical, when in 1962 archaeologists found that the southern wall of the supposed outer bailey was very similar. See 1975 floor plan.

The conclusion from the archaeological evidence was that in about 1265, the construction of a large 45 by 50 m (almost) square castle with square corner tower was started. On the inside of the northwest corner, was the still remaining 12 by 12 m tower house. This was cut off from the rest of the castle by a small inside moat.

The project for this formidable castle was not completed. Work on the castle and especially the main tower house continued in 1300–1304, but after that the project was left unfinished. In 1339, the castle is granted to Dirk van Matenesse, who begins to finish the main tower, leading to the 1574 castle.

=== The big tower or keep ===
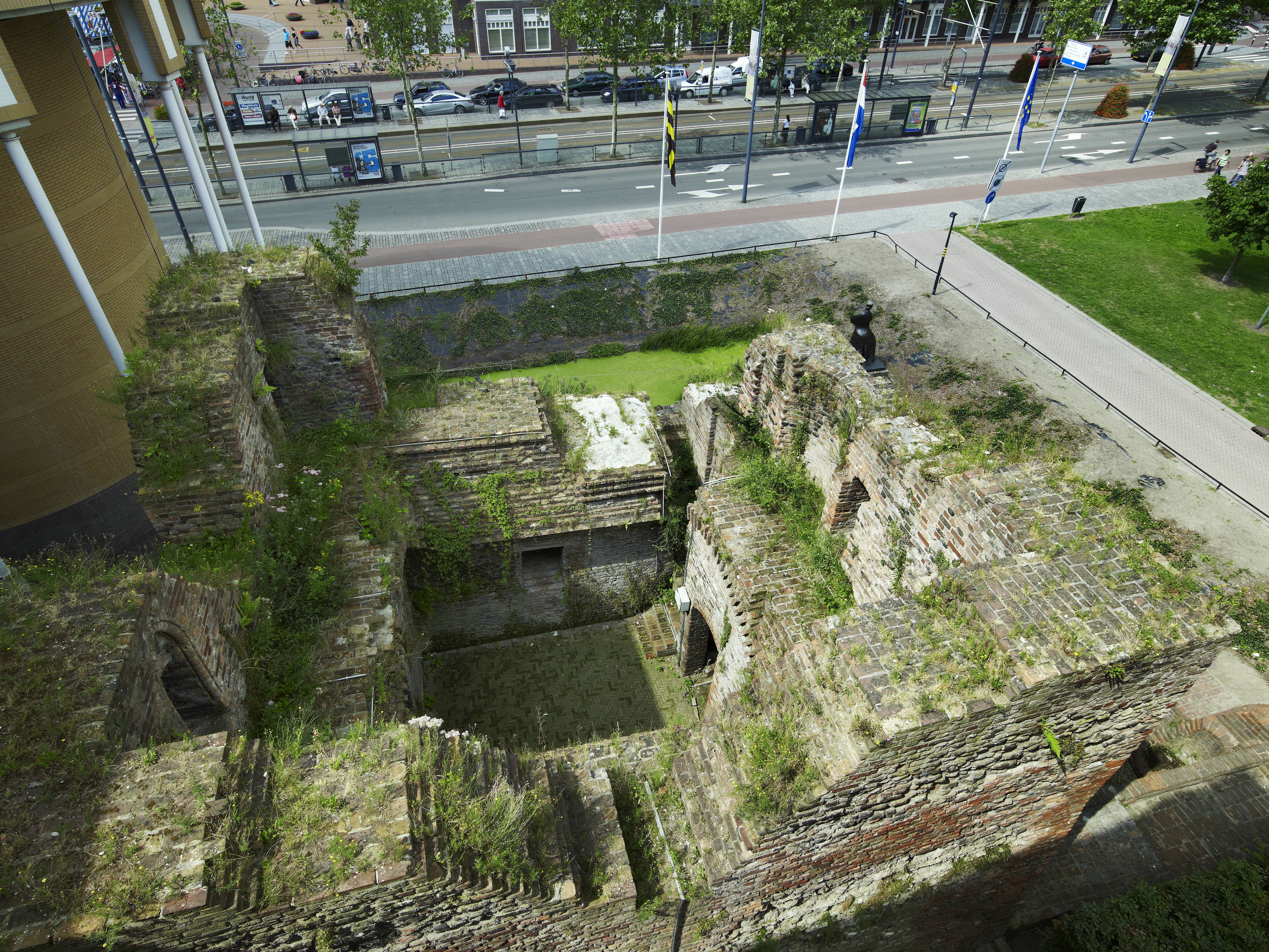
From above: the basement with vault parts, and the ground floor with thinner walls.

The remaining big tower or tower house was a free standing building within the square castle. It is supposed that the first phase of the castle was a solitary tower which was surrounded by the big square in about 1260. The situation of a free standing tower inside a square castle is very rare in the current Netherlands. The only other examples that comes to mind is Oud Haerlem Castle dating from about the same time.

The high basement of the tower was closed by a still discernible barrel vault. The basement had four openings to let in light. These were 12 cm wide on the outside, and 95 cm on the inside. The walls of the basement were over three meters thick. Inside the northwest wall were that gave access from the ground floor, which was actually very much above ground, but contained the access to the tower. The current direct access to the basement is a later breakthrough. This also goes for the access from the stairs to the later northern wing on the ground floor level.

The brick used in the foundation of the tower was the biggest found on the site in 1947–1948. It generally measured 28 cm with a thickness of 7.5–8 cm, but some 31–32 cm long. Higher up the exceptional lengths are not found. The brick above the basement is generally red, while the lower sections contain many yellowish bricks. This points to a construction break. Another clear indication is that after the basement was finished, it was allowed to sag into the ground on the eastern side, which necessitated a layer of cut bricks to make the construction level again before building the ground floor. The ground floor itself had walls of only 1.40 m thick. Here the stairs continued to the first floor. The ground floor had windows in the south and east walls, and probably also in the west wall. The south side had a toilet and a niche for a Lavabo with a sink of red stone. The north wall had a fireplace. From a drawing we know that the first floor had two windows in the east wall. It might be that the stairs protruded from the tower at this level, as is shown by the 1574 painting. Above the first floor was a hip roof with merlons.

== History ==
=== Holland vs. Avesnes ===
It has been claimed that the castle did not exist yet in 1268. Others claim that the big tower was surrounded by the square castle in 1260. The castle is mentioned for the first time as a castle on 18 March 1275, when Adelaide of Holland gave city rights to her new city near the Huys te Revier, i.e. Schiedam. In 1276, Aleid gave the abbey of Koningsveld the right to appoint one of its brothers to service the castle's chapel in exchange for 10 pounds a year.

Aleid (c.1260–1284) was the sister of count William II of Holland. William II (1227–1256) had a son and heir Floris V, Count of Holland (1254–1296), Aleid became his regent. Aleid had a son John and 5 younger sons, amongst them Florent of Hainaut. In 1272 Florent became Floris' lieutenant in Zeeland. In 1277, this led to conflict because Florent built fortified places and made himself liege lord of other fortified places in Holland. Te Riviere Castle would have played its part in the conflict. It led to the eviction of Aleid and her son from Holland and Zeeland.

=== Matenesse family ===
In 1299 the Avesnes family succeeded in its ambitions when John became count of Holland. Te Riviere Castle then became less important. Dirk of Matenesse first appears in history in 1335. In 1339, Te Riviere Castle was granted to Knight Dirk of Matenesse as a fief that could be inherited by his sons. After his death in February 1345 it was granted to his brother Daniël of Matenesse in May 1345. In September 1346, it was granted as a fief that could be inherited by his siblings and children. By 1350, the castle was inhabited, but probably not finished yet.

=== 1351 siege ===
The Hook and Cod Wars started in earnest after William of Bavaria came to Holland in the first days of February 1351. On 13 February he arrived in Delft, the center of the Cod party. Te Riviere Castle was taken by the Cod Alliance before 25 March. Some state that there was no siege, but in the 15th century, Simon van der Sluys stated that Daniël of Matenesse had surrendered the castle to those of Delft after a siege.

The speed by which the castle was taken can be explained by its importance for the trade of the Cod cities Delft and Schiedam. Another explanation is that at the time the castle was still so big that it could not be defended by a minor lord like Dirk of Matenesse. The citizens of Schiedam immediately took action after the siege, and demolished most of the huge castle. In the end Dirk was left with not much more than the keep, and a huge heap of rubble.

Dirk is now qualified as a 'not so fanatic' Hook, who changed to the Cod side before 28 December 1351. Dirk's lands were not forfeited. The historian De Geer suggested that Daniël changed sides.

=== Mathenesse Castle till 1574 ===
From the above, it can be assumed that Dirk then built the north wing, and that the southwest wing of the keep was built before 1400. In 1426, the castle might have been plundered by Willem Nagel. Meanwhile the Matenesse family held on to the castle, aided by the easy inheritance conditions.

=== The 1574 destruction ===
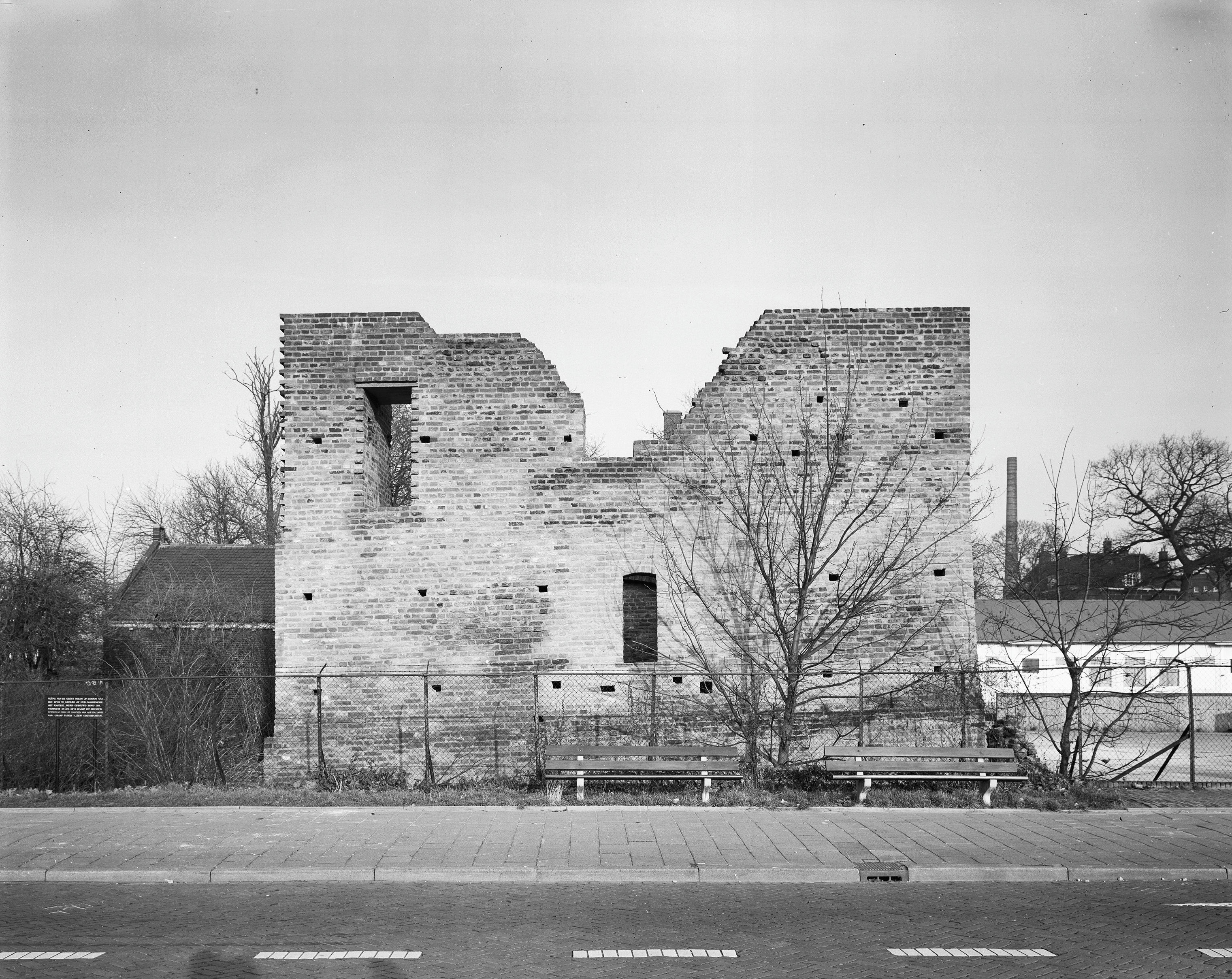
The remains of the castle in 1971

The Eighty Years' War (1568–1648) was fatal to the castle. In 1574, the Republican soldiers on the castle twice caused a fire. The citizens of Schiedam then demolished the castle by pulling over its walls, which were found in the moats exactly 400 years later. The upper part of the tower was also demolished.

== Current situation ==
For many years, the ruins of Te Riviere Castle stood free outside the city walls. After archaeological investigations, the town hall offices were extended over the area between the keep and the (supposed) outer bailey. The poor visual quality of the buildings and other choices made that by the 2010s, there were plans to redevelop the area.

By 2021, the plans include ideas to make the remaining ruins more visible. These are now dwarfed by the municipality offices.
