= Bonnefontaine, Switzerland =

Former municipality, canton of Fribourg

Bonnefontaine
- Former municipality
- Location of Bonnefontaine
- Location within Switzerland Location within Canton of Fribourg
- Coordinates: 46.7418°N 7.2010°E
- Country: Switzerland
- Canton: Fribourg
- District: Sarine
- Municipality: Le Mouret

Population (2000)
  - Total: 500
- Time zone: UTC+01:00 (CET)
  - Summer (DST): UTC+02:00 (CEST)
- SFOS number: 2176
- ISO 3166 code: CH-FR
- Website

Bonnefontaine (former German name Muffethan) is a former municipality in the Sarine district of the canton of Fribourg, Switzerland. In 2003 it merged with Essert, Montévraz, Oberried, Praroman and Zénauva to form the municipality of Le Mouret. It lies on the French–German language border (83% French speakers in 1990), between the Sarine and the Gérine. In 1989 it absorbed Montécu.

== History ==
Bonnefontaine is first mentioned around 1149 and 1179 as Bona Fontana and Bonus Fons. Around 1149 Marie de Bonnefontaine and her son gave Hauterive Abbey their rights to clear land in the royal forests (joux). In 1237 Aymon de Montagny granted his lands at Planfayon and Bonnefontaine as a fief to Guillaume d'Englisberg. The Bernese attacked Bonnefontaine in 1448, during the war against Fribourg.

Under the Ancien Régime Bonnefontaine belonged to the Old Lands (Anciennes Terres) of Fribourg, in the banner (bannière) of the Bourg. It was attached to the district of La Roche from 1798 to 1803 and then to that of Fribourg from 1803 to 1848.

In church matters Bonnefontaine was part of the parish of Ependes until the 17th century and then of that of Praroman; it became a parish of its own in 1898. Its church (1894), a place of pilgrimage, is dedicated to Our Lady of Lourdes. Straw hats were made in the village in the 19th century. Bonnefontaine has kept its agricultural character, with cattle breeding, and has also become a residential village.

Bonnefontaine had 213 inhabitants in 1811, 277 in 1850, 358 in 1870, 367 in 1900, 321 in 1950, 280 in 1970 and 500 in 2000 (including Montécu).

== Bibliography ==
- A. Dellion, Dictionnaire historique et statistique des paroisses catholiques du canton de Fribourg, vol. 9, pp. 197–199
- B. Dafflon, Etude en vue de la fusion des communes de Bonnefontaine et Montécu, 1987
