= Montévraz =

Former municipality, canton of Fribourg

- Former municipality
- Coat of arms
- Location of Montévraz
- Location within Switzerland Location within Canton of Fribourg
- Coordinates: 46.716664°N 7.183334°E
- Country: Switzerland
- Canton: Fribourg
- District: Sarine
- Municipality: Le Mouret

Population (2000)
  - Total: 491
- Time zone: UTC+01:00 (CET)
  - Summer (DST): UTC+02:00 (CEST)
- SFOS number: 2210
- ISO 3166 code: CH-FR
- Website

Montévraz is a former municipality in the Sarine district of the canton of Fribourg, Switzerland. In 2003 it merged with Bonnefontaine, Essert, Oberried, Praroman and Zénauva to form the municipality of Le Mouret. Its territory, at the foot of the Cousimbert range, comprised Montévraz-Dessus, Montévraz-Dessous and the hamlets of Montemblou and Pramathaux.

== History ==
Montévraz is first mentioned in 1445 as Montivrar. There is a defensive site of medieval origin at Montemblou. Montévraz became part of the Old Lands (Anciennes Terres), in the banner (bannière) of the Bourg, by 1442 at the latest. It was attached to the district of La Roche (1798–1803) and then to that of Fribourg (1803–1848).

In church matters Montévraz belonged to the parish of Ependes and, from 1644, to that of Praroman. The chapel of Saints Peter and Margaret, mentioned in 1654, enlarged in 1924 and 1951 and restored in 1988, became a place of pilgrimage dedicated to Notre-Dame-des-Grâces (Our Lady of Graces). From 1805 to 1816 Trappistine nuns lived at La Petite Riedera, the 16th-century château of the Gottrau family. The property passed into private hands and in 1838 was bequeathed to the diocese, which made it a summer residence.

The local economy includes the wood industry, a joinery and a construction company. Agriculture consists of livestock farming and fodder crops, with seven farms in 2000. Montévraz had 247 inhabitants in 1811, 204 in 1850, 249 in 1900, 258 in 1950 and 491 in 2000.

== Bibliography ==
- J.-M. Wicht, Montévraz, manuscript, Collège Saint-Michel, Fribourg, 1981
- Helvetia Sacra, III/3, p. 1069
- M.T. Kervingant, Des moniales face à la Révolution française, 1989, pp. 246–261, 340–345
- A. Lauper, Domaines patriciens et maisons de campagne de la région du Burgerwald et du Mouret, 2000, pp. 13–33
