= Oberried, Fribourg =

Former municipality, canton of Fribourg

Oberried
- Former municipality
- Farmhouse at Route du Village 85

- Coat of arms
- Location of Oberried
- Location within Switzerland Location within Canton of Fribourg
- Coordinates: 46.733333°N 7.183334°E
- Country: Switzerland
- Canton: Fribourg
- District: Sarine
- Municipality: Le Mouret

Population (2000)
  - Total: 197
- Time zone: UTC+01:00 (CET)
  - Summer (DST): UTC+02:00 (CEST)
- SFOS number: 2214
- ISO 3166 code: CH-FR
- Website

Oberried is a former municipality in the Sarine district of the canton of Fribourg, Switzerland. In 2003 it merged with Bonnefontaine, Essert, Montévraz, Praroman and Zénauva to form the municipality of Le Mouret. It is a street village along the municipal road, at the foot of the Petit Cousimbert in the Prealps.

== History ==
Oberried is first mentioned in 1274 as Oberrieth. There is a protohistoric fortification (a rampart) at La Feyla. Oberried was part of the Old Lands (Anciennes Terres), in the banner (bannière) of the Bourg, from 1442 at the latest, and then of the districts of La Roche (1798) and Fribourg (1803–1848). In church matters it belonged to the parish of Praroman, which had separated from that of Ependes in 1644.

From 1886 to 1900 the Sonnenwil estate housed the agricultural school, which was then moved to Grangeneuve. Afterwards it housed the Maison de la Sainte-Famille (House of the Holy Family), founded in 1901 by provost Hubert Savoy and Abbé Pierre Biolley, which from 1902 took in an institution for girls (social cases) entrusted to the congregation of the Sisters of Wisdom (Sœurs de la Sagesse). The house was hit by a fire in 1941. In 1976 it became an institute for children with behavioral problems, and since 1983 it has also included a home for the elderly.

From 1942 to 1973 the municipality was placed under administration (régie) because there were no candidates for election. A merger with Praroman and the neighboring municipalities was rejected in 1973; the project was taken up again in 1996 and was approved in the popular vote of June 2002. Oberried provides one of the nine members of the municipal council (the executive) of the new municipality of Le Mouret. The village has remained agricultural, with livestock farming and fodder crops.

Oberried had 86 inhabitants in 1811, 125 in 1850, 157 in 1900, 229 in 1950, 139 in 1980 and 197 in 2000.

== Bibliography ==
- A. Lauper, Le Mouret, 2007
