= Matilda of Brabant, Countess of Holland =

Countess of Holland (c.1200–1267)

Mathilde of Brabant
- Countess of Holland
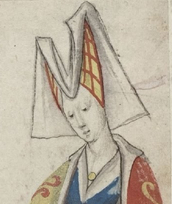
- Born: c. 1200
- Died: 22 December 1267 unknown
- Buried: unknown
- Noble family: Reginar
- Spouses: Henry VI; Floris IV, Count of Holland
- Issue: William II, Count of Holland; Floris de Voogd; Adelaide of Holland; Margaret; Machteld
- Father: Henry I, Duke of Brabant
- Mother: Mathilde of Flanders

Mathilde of Brabant, also called Machteld (c. 1200 – 22 December 1267), was Countess of Holland by marriage to Floris IV, Count of Holland. She was regent of Holland and Zeeland in 1234–1235.

She was the fourth child and daughter of Mathilde of Flanders and Henry I, Duke of Brabant. She married Henry II, Count Palatine of the Rhine (died 1214) in Aachen in 1212. She married Floris IV, Count of Holland on 6 December 1224.

When her spouse was killed at a tournament at Corbie in 1234, their eldest son William was only seven years old. Mathilde attempted to assume control as regent during his minority, as well as gaining full personal control of the County of Zeeland, which had been promised her as her dowry land. Neither of this was, however, accepted, and in 1235, she was forced to resign for all ambitions of regency. Instead, her sons' paternal uncles William and Otto, bishop of Utrecht, were his guardians until 1239.

After her son attained legal majority Mathilde stepped forward to assume an active role in his court and household, and became a prominent benefactor of abbeys and various institutions.

== Issue ==
1. William II, Count of Holland (1227–1256)
2. Floris de Voogd (c. 1228–1258), Regent of Holland in 1256–1258
3. Adelaide of Holland (c. 1230–1284), Regent of Holland in 1258–1263 (married John I of Avesnes, Count of Hainaut.)
4. Margaret (d. 1277)
