= William of Germany =

William of Germany may refer to:

- William II of Holland, medieval king of Germany (1247–56)
- William I, German Emperor (1871–88)
- Wilhelm II, German Emperor (1888–1918)
