= Oberried =

Oberried may refer to:

- Oberried am Brienzersee, Switzerland
- Oberried, Fribourg, Switzerland
- Oberried, Germany

== See also ==
- Oberrieden
