= Floris IV =

Count of Holland from 1222 to 1234

Count of Holland
- Reign: 1222 - 19 July 1234
- Predecessor: Wiliam I
- Successor: William II
- Born: 24 June 1210; The Hague, Holland (now The Hague, Netherlands)
- Died: 19 July 1234 (aged 24); Corbie, France
- Burial: Rijnsburg, Holland (now South Holland, Netherlands)
- Spouse: Matilde of Brabant
- Issue: William II, Count of Holland; Floris de Voogd; Adelaide of Holland; Margaret
- House: Holland
- Father: William I, Count of Holland
- Mother: Adelaide of Guelders

Floris IV (24 June 1210 – 19 July 1234) was the count of Holland from 1222 to 1234. He was born in The Hague, a son of William I of Holland and his first wife, Adelaide of Guelders.

Floris succeeded his father in 1222. His regent was Baldwin of Bentheim. He acquired the Land of Altena. He had constant disputes with the bishop of Utrecht, Otto II of Lippe, but helped him against the peasants of Drenthe in 1227. Floris fought in the crusade against the Stedinger north of Bremen in 1234.

On 19 July 1234, he was killed at a tournament in Corbie, France. He was buried at Rijnsburg Abbey.

== Family ==
His brother was Otto III van Holland.

Floris married, before 6 December 1224, his step-aunt Matilda, daughter of Duke Henry I of Brabant. They had five children:

1. William II, Count of Holland (1227–1256), married Elisabeth of Brunswick-Luneburg; parents of Floris V, Count of Holland
2. Floris de Voogd (ca. 1228–1258), Regent of Holland in 1256–1258.
3. Adelaide of Holland (ca. 1230–1284), Regent of Holland in 1258–1263, married John I of Avesnes, Count of Hainaut.
4. Margaret (d. 1277), married Count Herman I of Henneberg-Coburg
5. Machteld

Preceded by William I	Count of Holland; 1222–1234	Succeeded by William II
