= Ausburger and Pfahlburger =

Classes of men in the Holy Roman Empire

Ausburger and Pfahlburger (sometimes Ausbürger and Pfahlbürger) were two classes of men in the Holy Roman Empire during the Middle Ages.

An Ausburger (external citizen or "outburgher") was a citizen of an imperial free city who resided on a rural estate outside of the city's jurisdiction. A Pfahlburger (pale citizen) was a citizen of a free city who lived in the faubourg (suburbs) outside of the city's jurisdiction. Both claimed citizenship and its rights while being vassals of and living under the jurisdiction of territorial lords. The distinction between them was their distance from the city of which they claimed citizenship. According to M. I. Schmidt, the Pfahlburgers claimed to be exempt from the taxation of their lords, while the Ausburgers did not claim an exemption. According to F.-J. Fuchs, Ausburger may have been a general term that included the more specific Pfahlburger.

The term Pfahlburger refers to the Pfahl (picket or palisade) that enclosed the suburbs but lay beyond the city walls. The "burgesses of the palisades" were men who had moved into the suburbs to escape the authority of their lords and obtain the protection of the city. Cities were generally willing to grant full or partial citizenship to such persons, but the lords strongly objected to this practice, since the area between the palisades and the walls lay "outside the more closely defined legal boundaries of the municipality".

In 1205, King Philip exempted from taxes the lands owned by the citizens of Strasbourg in Alsace. This caused a rush of Alsatian landowners seeking citizenship in Strasbourg. The Emperor Frederick II (1220–50) tried in vain to ban the practice of cities granting citizenship to non-residents. According to the Annales Wormatienses, on 10 November 1255, King William "eliminated the rights of citizens who are called Pfahlbürger so that among other restrictions, none of the cities were permitted to have them or receive them". A later scribe added a gloss to the Annales to clarify that the Pfahlburgers "were citizens who were not resident in the city".

At a Hoftag (diet) in Metz in 1356, Jean de Lichtenberg, the bishop of Strasbourg and lord of Lichtenberg, complained about the practice to the Emperor Charles IV, who forbade it in the Golden Bull of 1356, a foundational constitutional document of the later empire. The distinction between Ausburger and Pfahlburger may post-date 1365, since only the Pfahlburger is mentioned in the Golden Bull. The term Ausburger, which had until then referred only to land-owning noblemen who also held citizenship, may have been extended after 1356 to cover peasant Pfahlburger so as to evade Charles' prohibition. In 1430, King Sigismund banned the city of Constance from having Ausburgers, but he lifted the ban in 1436.

== Sources ==
- Bachrach, David S., ed. (2016). The Histories of a Medieval German City, Worms c. 1000–c. 1300: Translation and Commentary. Routledge.
- Burson, Joshua Robert (2009). The Relationship Between the City of Constance and the Surrounding Countryside in the Fifteenth Century (PhD diss.). Yale University.
- Comyn, Robert Buckley (1851). The History of the Western Empire: From its Restoration by Charlemagne to the Accession of Charles V. Vol. II. London: William H. Allen & Co.
- Fuchs, F.-J. (1962). "Le droit de bourgeoisie à Strasbourg". Revue d'Alsace (101): 19–28.
- Hallam, Henry (1837). View of the State of Europe during the Middle Ages (PDF). New York: Harper & Brothers.
- Militzer, K. (1993). "Pfahlburger". Lexikon des Mittelalters. Vol. 6. Munich: LexMA-Verlag.
