= Floris de Voogd =

Dutch ruler

Floris de Voogd (c. 1228 – 26 March 1258 in Antwerp) "the guardian" of Holland, son of Floris IV, Count of Holland (1210–1234) and Matilda of Brabant (ca. 1202-1267). He reigned temporarily for William II of Holland while the latter was engaged in Germany. After King William's death in 1256, he was the guardian of Floris V, Count of Holland, son of William. He is sometimes referred to as "Florentius tutor".

He defeated the army of Flanders that had invaded Walcheren in 1253, where he captured Guy and John of Dampierre, both sons of Margaret II, Countess of Flanders and commanders for Flanders. In 1256, he signed a peace treaty (called the "Treaty of Péronne") with Flanders on the status of Zeeland, reaffirming Flanders' rights west of the Scheldt river. Flanders was forced to compensate Holland for the damages of the war, and only after this were Margaretha's sons freed. Floris was killed at a tournament in Antwerp, and was buried in Middelburg.
