= James of Avesnes =

French nobility who went on Crusade (1152–1191)

- Born: 1152
- Died: 7 September 1191; Arsuf, Levant
- Noble family: House of Avesnes
- Spouse: Adela of Guise
- Issue: Walter II of Avesnes; James II of Avesnes; Bouchard IV of Avesnes
- Father: Nicholas d'Oisy, Lord of Avesnes
- Mother: Matilda de la Roche

James of Avesnes (also Jacques or Jacob; 1152 – 7 September 1191) was a son of Nicholas d'Oisy, Lord of Avesnes and Matilda de la Roche. He was the lord of Avesnes, Condé, and Leuze from 1171. In November 1187, James joined the Third Crusade as leader of a detachment of French, Flemish, and Frisian crusaders arriving by ship on the Palestinian coast near Acre around 10 September 1189. James and his men came as military reinforcements for the Siege of Acre. While leading his contingent of soldiers, the other main leaders of the siege were Guy of Lusignan and Henry of Champagne, neither of them gaining a dominant position in leading the siege.

At the Battle of Arsuf, James was thrown from his saddle and, after slaying fifteen enemy warriors, was himself cut down. The next day, a search party of Hospitallers and Templars found his body on the battlefield. It was taken back to Arsuf and buried there in a ceremony attended by Richard the Lionheart and Guy of Lusignan. The early 13th-century Brevis ordinacio de predicacione Sancte Crucis, a manual for crusade preachers, records how, when his companions urged him to retreat because of the great losses, he responded, "I shall much more gladly go where no one knows me."

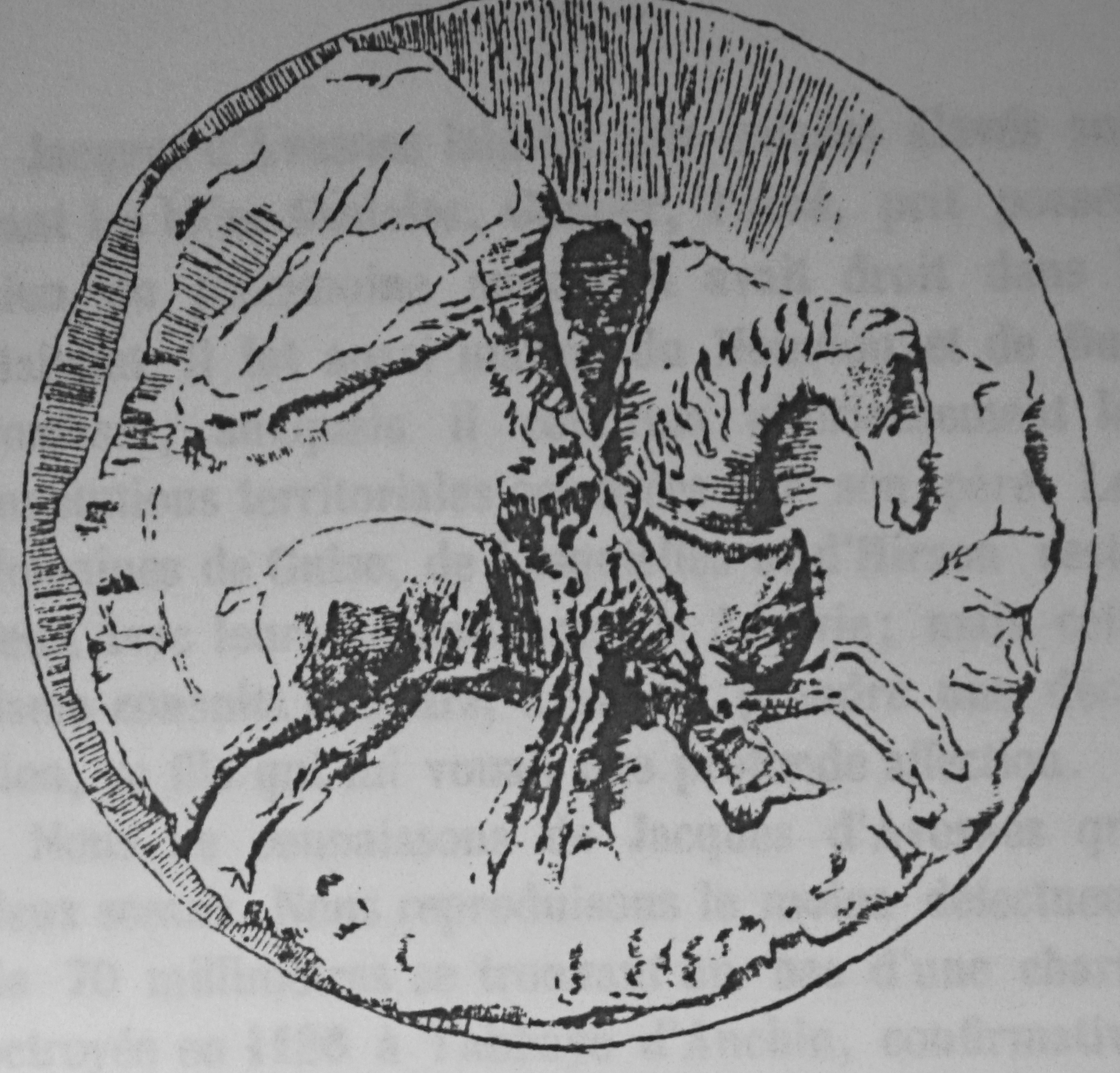
Seal of James of Avesnes on horseback, dated 1186

James married Adela (died 1185), daughter of Bouchard of Guise. They had:

- Walter II of Avesnes
- James, lord of Landrecies
- William (died 1219)
- Bouchard IV of Avesnes
- Matilda, married (1) Nicholas IV of Rumigny and (2) Louis IV of Chiny
- Adelaide, married Rogier of Rosoy (died 1246)
- Ida (1180–1216), married Engelbert IV of Edingen
- Adela, married (1) Henry III of Grandpré and (2) Ralph, Count of Soissons

== Sources ==
- Asbridge, Thomas (2012). The Crusades: The War for the Holy Land. Simon and Schuster. ISBN 978-1-84983-770-5.
- Maier, Christoph T. (2019). "Brevis Ordinacio de Predicacione Sancte Crucis: Edition, Translation and Commentary". Crusades. 18 (1): 25–65.
- Platelle, Henri (2004). Présence de l'au-delà: une vision médiévale du monde (in French). Presses Universitaires du Septentrion. ISBN 9782859398521.
- Seale, Yvonne; Wacha, Heather, eds. (2023). The Cartulary of Prémontré. University of Toronto Press. ISBN 9781487545420.
