= Avesnes family =

Medieval French noble family

Avesnes
- noble family
- Coat of Arms
- Country: France, Netherlands
- Founded: 11th century
- Founder: Fastré I d'Oisy
- Final ruler: Margaret II, Countess of Hainaut
- Dissolution: 14th century

The Avesnes family played an important role during the Middle Ages. The family has its roots in the small village Avesnes-sur-Helpe, in the north of France.

One branch produced a number of Counts of Holland during the 13th century. The family died out in the 14th century.

== Origin of the House: feud between Dampierre and Avesnes ==
Baldwin, the first emperor of the Latin Empire of Constantinople, was as Baldwin IX Count of Flanders and as Baldwin VI Count of Hainaut. Baldwin had only daughters and was in turn succeeded by his daughters Joan (reigned 1205–1244) and Margaret II (reigned 1244–1280).

In 1212 Margaret II married Bouchard d'Avesnes, a prominent Hainaut nobleman. This was apparently a love match, though it was approved by Margaret's sister Joan, who had herself recently married. The two sisters subsequently had a falling-out over Margaret's share of their inheritance, which led Joan to attempt to get Margaret's marriage dissolved. She alleged that the marriage was invalid, and without much inspection of the facts of the case Pope Innocent III condemned the marriage, though he did not formally annul it.

Bourchard and Margaret continued as a married couple, having 3 children, as their conflict with Joan grew violent and Bouchard was captured and imprisoned in 1219. He was released in 1221 on the condition that the couple separate and that Bouchard get absolution from the pope. While he was in Rome, Joan convinced Margaret to remarry, this time to William II of Dampierre, a nobleman from Champagne. From this marriage Margaret had two sons: William II, Count of Flanders and Guy of Dampierre.

This situation caused something of a scandal, for the marriage was possibly bigamous, and violated the church's strictures on consanguinity as well. The disputes regarding the validity of the two marriages and the legitimacy of her children by each husband continued for decades, becoming entangled in the politics of the Holy Roman Empire and resulting in the long War of the Succession of Flanders and Hainault.

In 1246 king Louis IX of France, acting as an arbitrator, gave the right to inherit Flanders to the Dampierre children, and the rights to Hainaut to the Avesnes children. This would seem to have settled the matter, but in 1253 problems arose again. The eldest son, John I of Avesnes, who was uneasy about his rights, convinced William of Holland, the German king recognized by the pro-papal forces, to seize Hainaut and the parts of Flanders which were within the bounds of the empire. William of Holland was theoretically, as king, overlord for these territories, and also John's brother-in-law. A civil war followed, which ended when the Avesnes forces defeated and imprisoned the Dampierres at the Battle of West-Capelle of 4 July 1253, after which John I of Avesnes was able to force Guy of Dampierre and his mother to respect the division of Louis and grant him Hainault.

Margaret did not rest in her defeat and did not recognise herself as overcome. She instead granted Hainault to Charles of Anjou, the brother of King Louis, who had recently returned from the crusade. Charles took up her cause and warred with John I of Avesnes, but failed to take Valenciennes and just missed being killed in a skirmish. When Louis returned in 1254, he reaffirmed his earlier arbitration and ordered his brother to get out of the conflict. Charles returned to Provence. With this second arbitration of the holy king, the conflict closed and John I of Avesnes was secure in Hainault.

The following decades saw further strife between the Dampierres and the Avesnes, who by the start of the 14th century had also inherited the County of Holland and Zeeland.

== Family Tree ==
- Fastré I d'Oisy m. Ade
  - Fastré II d'Oisy m. Richilde
    - Wautier I d'Oisy m. Ida de Mortagne
      - Nicholas le Beau (1129–1171) m. Mathilde de La Roche
        - James of Avesnes (1150–1191) m. Ameline de Guise
          - Walter II of Avesnes (1180?-1246) m. Marguerite de Blois (1231)
          - Bouchard IV of Avesnes (1182–1244) m. Margaret II of Flanders
            - John I of Avesnes (1218–1257) m. Adelaide of Holland
              - John II of Avesnes count of Hainaut and Holland (r. 1280-1304) m. Philippa of Luxembourg
                - William III of Avesnes (1286–1337) m. Joan of Valois
                  - William IV of Avesnes (r. 1337-1345) m. Joanna, Duchess of Brabant
                  - Margaret II of Hainaut (r. 1345-1356) m. Louis IV Wittelsbach
              - Guy of Avesnes (-1317)
                - Aleid of Avesnes, married Otto van Asperen van Heuckelom
                - Maria of Avesnes, married Arnold, Lord of IJsselstein
              - Florent of Hainaut (r. 1289–1297) m. Isabella of Villehardouin
                - Matilda of Hainaut (1293–1331)
            - Baldwin of Avesnes (1219–1295) m. Felicitas of Coucy
              - Beatrice of Avesnes (died 1321) m. Henry VI, Count of Luxembourg

== See also ==
- Counts of Hainaut family tree
