= Guy of Avesnes =

Bishop of Utrecht from 1301 to 1317

Guy van Avesnes
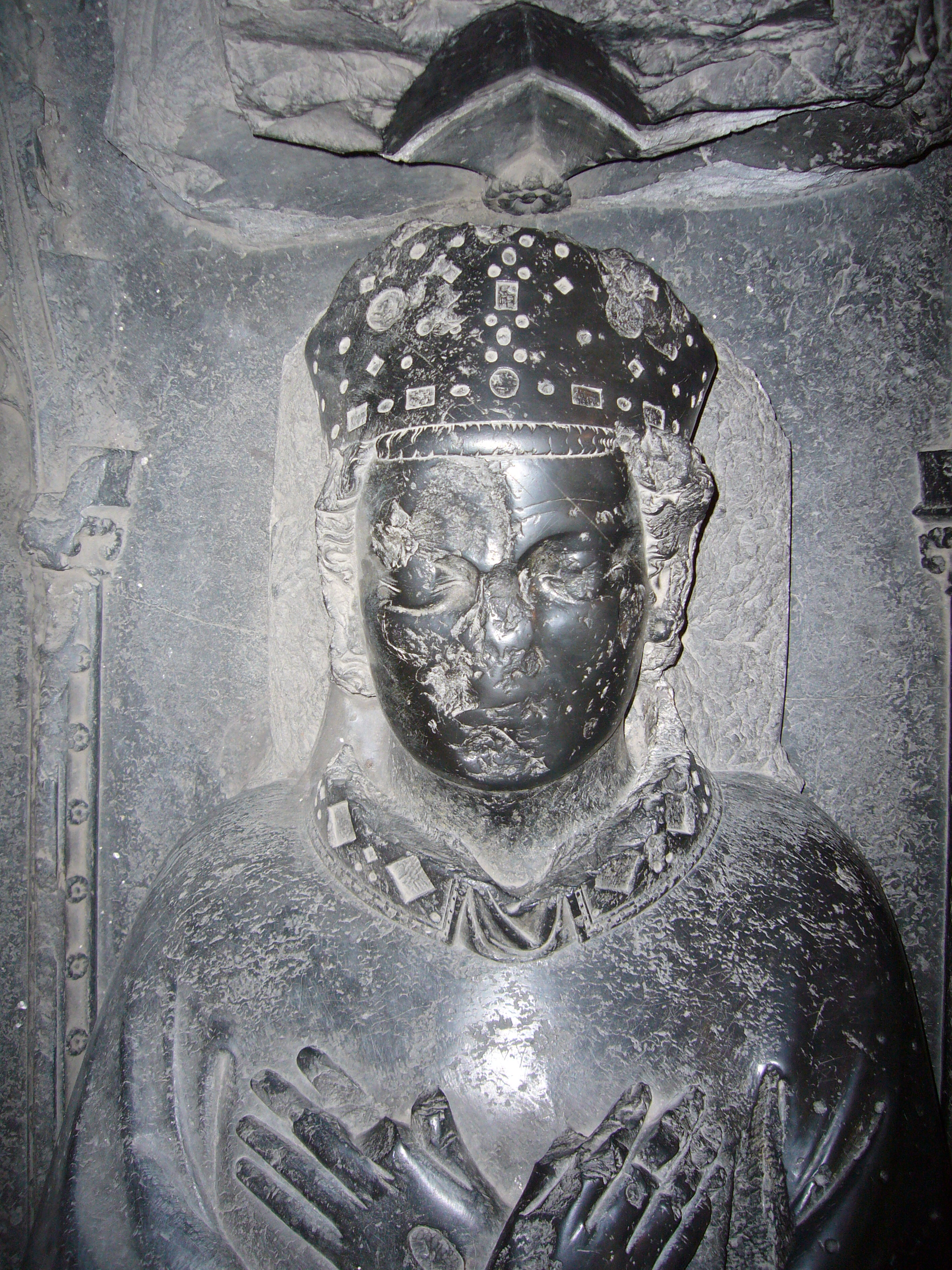
- Damaged face on the tomb of Guy van Avesnes in Utrecht Cathedral
- Died: 23 May 1317
- Noble family: House of Avesnes
- Father: John I of Avesnes
- Mother: Adelaide of Holland

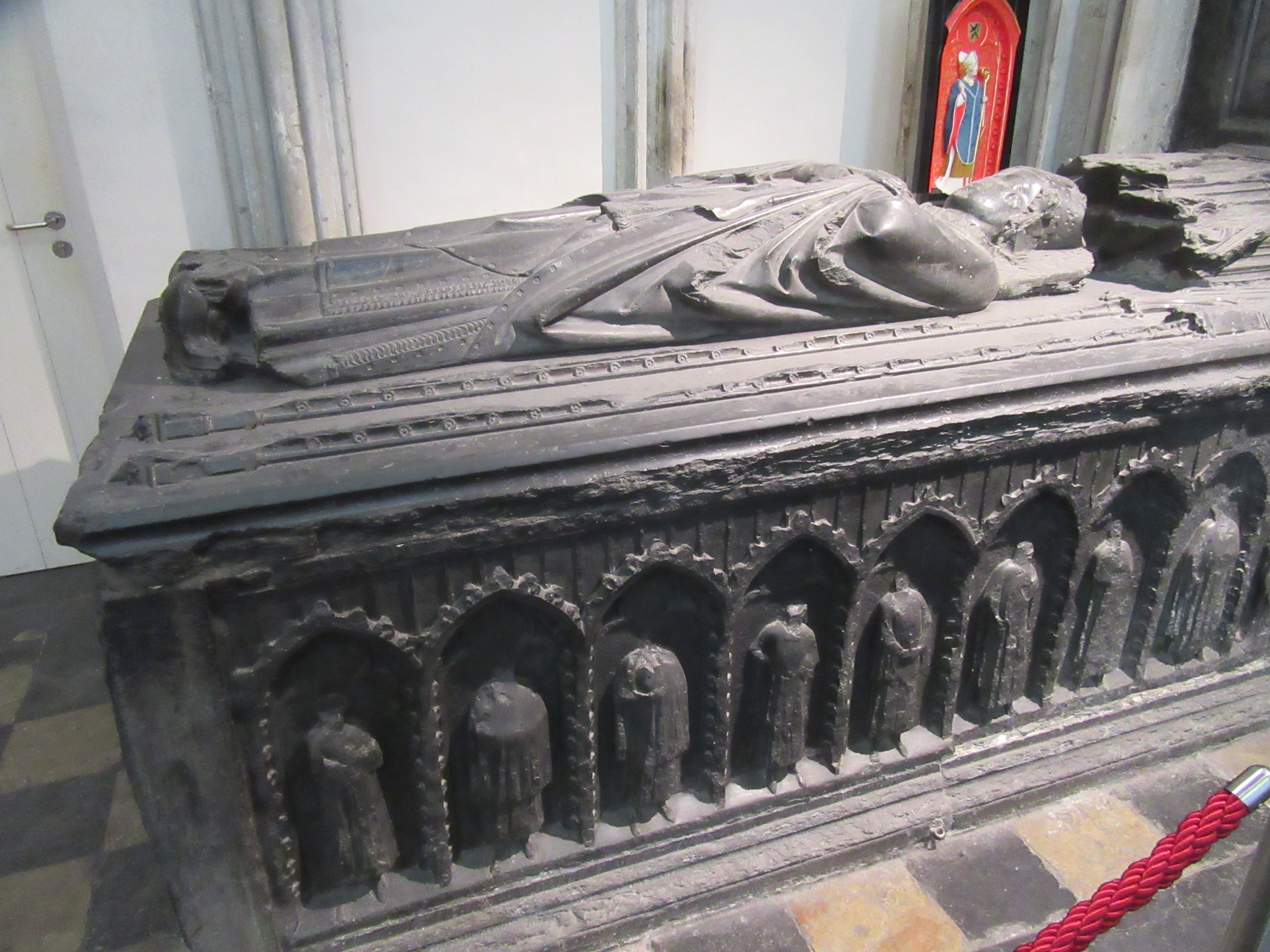
The tomb of Guy of Avesnes, Utrecht Cathedral

Guy van Avennes (also spelt as Guy van Avesnes; Dutch Gwijde van Avesnes) (c. 1253 – 23 May 1317, Utrecht) was Bishop of Utrecht from 1301 to 1317.

== Family ==
He was descended from an important Hainaut family, the House of Avesnes. He was the brother of John II, Count of Hainaut and Count of Holland, and their parents were John I of Avesnes and Adelaide of Holland.

== Life ==
It was John II who ensured Guy's appointment as bishop of Utrecht in 1301, instead of Adolf II van Waldeck, and he was consecrated bishop by the archbishop of Cologne in 1302, the following year. He brought about a reconciliation between the Lichtenbergers and the Fresingen. However, in 1304 he weakened his brother John's position by leading an offensive of Flemish troops which then occupied Holland and the Sticht. Guy was then captured at the Battle of Duiveland on 20 March 1304. In Guy's absence, the Fresingen seized power in Utrecht with the support of the guilds, whose privileges they fixed in the "Gildenbrief" of 9 May 1304. On 14 September 1305, the guilds' regime had to capitulate to bishop Guy (who had been released), but from then on the city retained a high degree of autonomy. However, it took until 1309 before the king fully recognised the bishop as Utrecht's secular lord.

In 1311, Guy took his place at the first Council of Vienne, and from that date on he was frequently abroad. He knew well that a compromise had to be made between the various parties in the Sticht and in Utrecht itself, and so took up a middle-of-the-road position. He personally managed the possessions of the lordships of Aemstel and of Woerden, and as such granted town privileges to Amsterdam in 1306. After his death these lordships definitively devolved to the count of Holland. He was buried in Utrecht Cathedral and his tomb, damaged during the iconoclasm in the 16th century, still survives.

Guy had two daughters, Aleid (who married Otto van Asperen van Heuckelom) and Maria (who married Arnold, Lord of IJsselstein).

== Bibliography ==
- (in Dutch) G.C. van Nieuwenhuizen: Gwijde van Avesnes, Bisschop van Utrecht 1301-1317; scriptie RUU (1976)
- (in Dutch) G. van der Zee: Vaderlandsche Kerkgeschiedenis; Kampen (1936)

Preceded by Willem II Berthout	Bishop of Utrecht; 1301–1317	Succeeded by Frederik II van Sierck
