= James II of Avesnes =

- Died: 1205
- Known for: Knight of the Fourth Crusade

James II of Avesnes (died c.1205) was a knight of the Fourth Crusade. He was probably the son of James of Avesnes of Hainaut, who was a leading protagonist of the Third Crusade.

After the conquest of Constantinople James was one of the followers of Boniface of Montferrat, who had become king of Thessalonica. As part of the forces of Boniface in Greece he fought against Leo Sgouros, a Greek local ruler who had become independent. James received of Boniface in the spring of 1205 the island of Euboea (Triarchy of Negroponte) as a fief. James died around 1205 and Euboea was divided into three fiefs for Boniface.

== Sources ==
- John B. Bury: The Lombards and Venetians in Euboia. (1205–1303). In: The Journal of Hellenic Studies. 7, 1886, ISSN 0075-4269, pp. 309–352.
- Louis de Mas Latrie: Les Seigneurs tierciers de Négropont. In: Revue de l'Orient latin. 1, 1893, ZDB-ID 280906-0, pp. 413–432.
- Setton, Kenneth M.; Wolff, Robert Lee; Hazard, Harry W., eds. (1969) [1962]. A History of the Crusades, Volume II: The Later Crusades, 1189–1311 (Second ed.). Madison, Milwaukee, and London: University of Wisconsin Press. ISBN 0-299-04844-6.
