= Nicholas d'Oisy, Lord of Avesnes =

French noble (c. 1130 – c. 1170)

- Born: c. 1130
- Died: c. 1170
- Noble family: House of Avesnes
- Spouse: Matilda de la Roche
- Issue: James of Avesnes; Ida; Fastrad
- Father: Walter I, Lord of Avesnes
- Mother: Ada of Tournai

Nicholas d'Oisy, Lord of Avesnes, nicknamed le Beau ("the Beautiful") (c. 1130 – c. 1170), was a son of Walter I, Lord of Avesnes and his wife, Ada of Tournai. He was Lord of Avesnes, Leuze and Condé. He built castles in Landrechies and Condé.

Nicholas married Matilda de la Roche, the widow of Thierry de Walcourt. She was the daughter of Henry I of la Roche (c. 1100 – 1126), Count of la Roche and warden of Stavelot and Malmedy and Matilda of Limburg.

They had:

- James of Avesnes, succeeded his father and died during the Third Crusade
- Ida (d. c. 1205), married Ingelram, Count of Saint Pol and secondly, castellan William IV of Saint-Omer
- Fastrad, warden of La Flamengerie Abbey.

== Sources ==
- Gislebertus of Mons (2005). Napran, Laura (ed.). Chronicle of Hainaut. The Boydell Press. ISBN 9781843831204.
- Seale, Yvonne; Wacha, Heather, eds. (2023). The Cartulary of Prémontré. University of Toronto Press. ISBN 9781487545420.

Nicholas d'Oisy, Lord of Avesnes House of Avesnes Born: c. 1130 Died: c. 1170
Preceded by Walter I	Lord of Avesnes; 1147-1171	Succeeded by James
