= Adelaide of Holland =

Countess of Hainaut (c. 1230 – 1284)

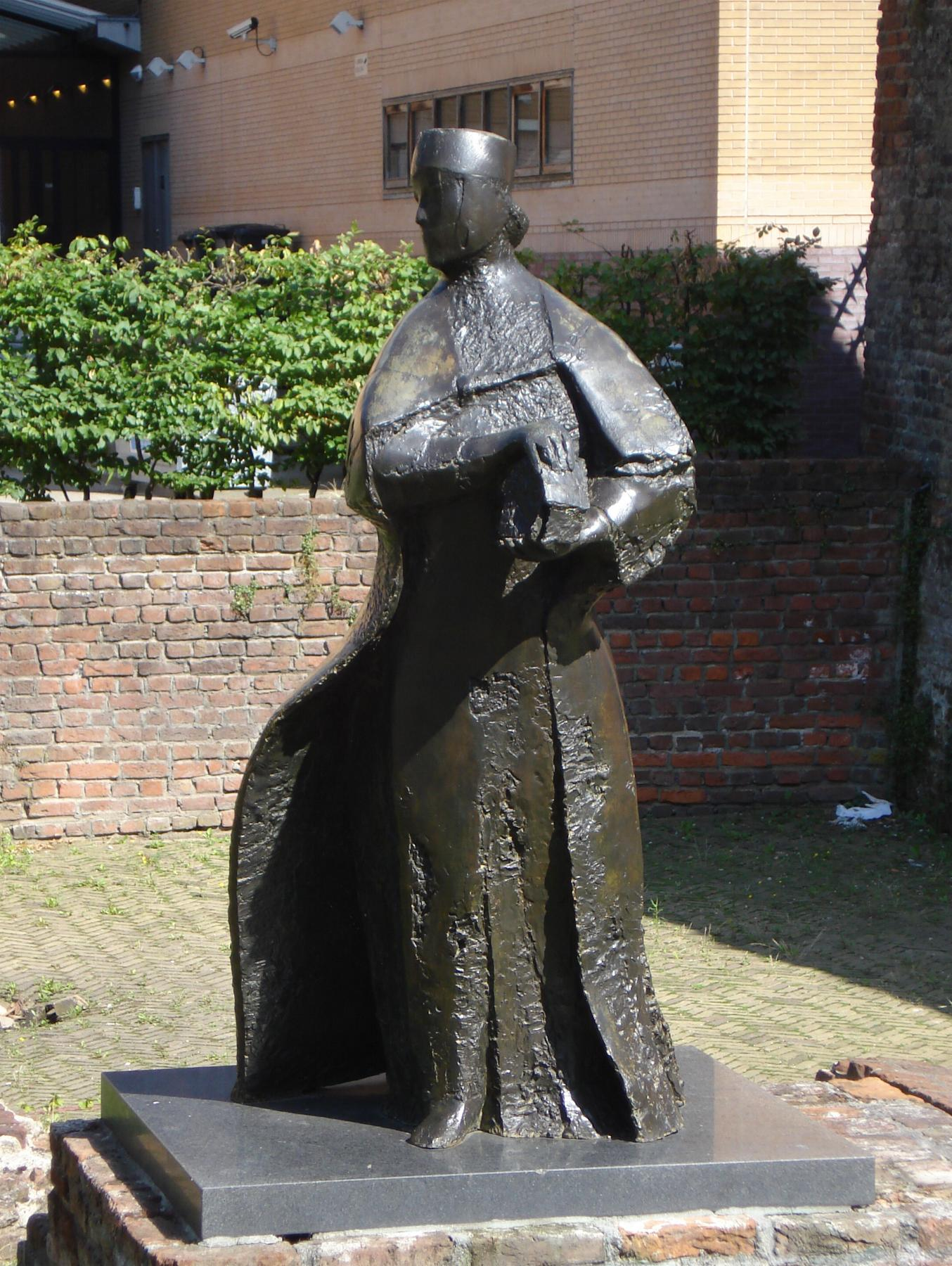
- Statue of Aleida of Holland
- Born: c. 1230
- Died: 1284 (aged 53–54)
- Buried: Valenciennes
- Noble family: Holland
- Spouse: John I, Count of Hainaut
- Issue: John II, Count of Hainaut and Holland; Baldwin of Hainaut; Joanna, Abbess of Flines; Bouchard, Bishop of Metz; Guy of Avesnes; William, Bishop of Cambrai; Florent of Hainaut
- Father: Floris IV, Count of Holland
- Mother: Matilda of Brabant

Adelaide of Holland (Dutch: Aleide (Aleidis); c. 1230 – buried 9 April 1284) was a Countess of Hainaut by marriage to John I, Count of Hainaut. She acted as the regent of the County of Holland during the minority of her nephew Count Floris V between 1256 and 1263.

She was a daughter of Floris IV, Count of Holland and Matilda of Brabant, and a sister of William II, Count of Holland and King of Germany.

== Life ==
On 9 October 1246, Adelaide married John I of Avesnes, Count of Hainaut. Like her mother, she was a patron of religious houses. Her religious interest is reflected in that three of her sons became bishops, and her one daughter became an abbess. She also insisted on a bilingual education for them.

Between 1258 and 1263, Adelaide was regent of Holland in the name of her nephew Floris V. She called herself Guardian of Holland and Zeeland (Tutrix de Hollandie et Zeelandie). After he came of age, she continued to advise him. She died in 1284 at Valenciennes, but in 1299, with the death of Floris' son John I, it was her own son John II who inherited Holland through her.

She gave Town privileges to Schiedam, which afterward had the right to be called a city. In it, she founded Te Riviere Castle, which was then the second-largest castle in Holland.

She ordered the construction of the Schielands Hoge Zeedijk, which today continues to protect 3 million inhabitants in a wide area around Rotterdam.

Jacob van Maerlant dedicated his first poem, Geesten, to Adelaide.

== Issue ==
With John I, she had the following issue:

1. John II, Count of Hainaut and Holland (1247–1304)
2. Baldwin (born after 1247, lived in 1299)
3. Joanna, abbess of Flines (died 1304)
4. Bouchard, Bishop of Metz (1251–1296)
5. Guy, Bishop of Utrecht (1253–1317)
6. William, Bishop of Cambrai (1254–1296)
7. Floris, stadholder of Zeeland and Prince of Achaea (1255–1297)

== See also ==
- Counts of Hainaut
- Counts of Holland

== Sources ==
- Pollock, M.A. (2015). Scotland, England and France after the loss of Normandy, 1204-1296. The Boydell Press.
