= Annales Wormatienses =

Latin chronicle of the city of Worms for the years 1226–127

The Annales Wormatienses (or Annals of Worms, German: Wormser Annalen) is an anonymous Latin chronicle of the city of Worms for the years 1226–1278. It is a civic history, a relatively new genre in German kingdom at the time. It may be the earliest German example of the type, which originated in Italian kingdom in the 11th century. The goal of such local histories was justify the city's autonomy and self-government. In the case of Worms, independence from the bishop of Worms and the status of a free city within the Holy Roman Empire.

The surviving Annales is fragmentary. The original probably extended from the 4th century, when the city was Christianized, until 1283 and the death of Bishop Frederick I. It was written in the late 13th century. As it stands, it begins with the establishment of the free city in 1226, against the opposition of Bishop Henry II.

The author was probably a layman who sat on the municipal council. He made extensive use of the municipal archives. He presents the Wormsers as a unified community seeking to uphold their rights. He presents the Jews as an integral part of this community. Although they fight constantly for the rights, the Wormsers are also portrayed as loyal to the empire in its contest with the Papacy. The Annales can be roughly divided into three sections. The first concerns the contest between the city and the bishopric. The second concerns the wars between kings Frederick II and Conrad IV and the Papacy between 1227 and 1254, in which the city took the side of the kings. The third concerns the Great Interregnum following the death of King William in 1256, a period during which Worms established its own "foreign policy". The last two sections are exceptionally valuable sources for understanding the military resources of the city.

The Annales has a complicated manuscript and publication history. The work edited under the title Annales Wormatienses in the Monumenta Germaniae Historica combines the Annales proper and the Chronicon Wormatiense. The definitive edition was published by Heinrich Boos in 1893. There is an English translation by David Bachrach.

== Excerpt ==
The following excerpt covers Worms's attack on Alzey:

On the octave of St. John the Baptist 1260, the citizens of Worms advanced with numerous territorial lords to destroy that den of thieves, Alzey. This expedition cost the citizens of Worms more than 1,000 marks. The Jews provided a subsidy of 400 pounds of the money of Halle to this enterprise in July. ... All of the men of Worms were there as a powerful force with their battle flag and their battle wagon. They undertook very heavy expenses on account of their engines, their equipment, and their archers. They also brought considerable quantities of food from Worms. During the siege, the old steward Werner was captured along with two of his knights. The men of Worms presented the knights and the steward to Lord E the count of Leiningen, who led him off to Leiningen and received 400 marks from him. Lord Philip of Hohenfels was the only one in Alzey to help the people there with his men against all of the lords of the province. Soon afterward the matter was settled through the mediating efforts of Bishop Werner of Mainz. The lords and the cities were permitted to destroy the walls and moat around Alzey.

== Bibliography ==
- Bachrach, David S., ed. (2014). The Histories of a Medieval German City, Worms c. 1000–c. 1300: Translation and Commentary. Ashgate.
- Boos, Heinrich (1893). Monumenta Wormatiensia: Annalen und Chroniken. Weidmann.
- Büttner, Jan Ulrich (2016). "Annales Wormatienses". In Graeme Dunphy; Cristian Bratu (eds.). Encyclopedia of the Medieval Chronicle. Brill Online. doi:10.1163/2213-2139_emc_SIM_00581.
