= Le Mouret =

- Municipality
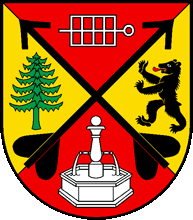
- Coat of arms
- Location of Le Mouret
- Location within Switzerland Location within Canton of Fribourg
- Coordinates: 46°45′N 7°10′E
- Country: Switzerland
- Canton: Fribourg
- District: Sarine

Government
  - Mayor: Syndic

Area
  - Total: 18.47 km^{2} (7.13 sq mi)
- Elevation: 754 m (2,474 ft)

Population (December 2020)
  - Total: 3,148
  - Density: 170.4/km^{2} (441.4/sq mi)
- Time zone: UTC+01:00 (CET)
  - Summer (DST): UTC+02:00 (CEST)
- Postal code: 1724
- SFOS number: 2220
- ISO 3166 code: CH-FR
- Localities: Bonnefontaine, Essert, Montévraz, Oberried, Praroman, Zénauva
- Surrounded by: Ependes, Ferpicloz, La Roche, Plasselb, Sankt Silvester, Senèdes, Tentlingen, Treyvaux, Villarsel-sur-Marly
- Website: www.le-mouret.ch

Le Mouret (French pronunciation: [lə muʁɛ]) is a municipality in the district of Sarine in the canton of Fribourg in Switzerland. It was created on January 1, 2003 from the union of the former municipalities of Bonnefontaine, Essert, Montévraz, Oberried, Praroman, and Zénauva.

== Geography ==
Aerial view (1964)

Le Mouret has an area, as of 2009, of 18.5 square kilometers (7.1 mi^{2}). Of this area, 8.95 km^{2} (3.46 mi^{2}) or 48.3% is used for agricultural purposes, while 7.84 km^{2} (3.03 mi^{2}) or 42.3% is forested. Of the rest of the land, 1.61 km^{2} (0.62 mi^{2}) or 8.7% is settled (buildings or roads), 0.02 km^{2} (4.9 acres) or 0.1% is either rivers or lakes and 0.05 km^{2} (12 acres) or 0.3% is unproductive land.

Of the built up area, housing and buildings made up 5.5% and transportation infrastructure made up 2.0%. Out of the forested land, 40.6% of the total land area is heavily forested and 1.7% is covered with orchards or small clusters of trees. Of the agricultural land, 14.5% is used for growing crops and 30.4% is pastures and 3.0% is used for alpine pastures. All the water in the municipality is flowing water.

== Demographics ==
Le Mouret has a population (as of December 2020) of 3,148. As of 2008, 8.5% of the population are resident foreign nationals. Over the last 10 years (2000–2010) the population has changed at a rate of 8.4%. Migration accounted for 4%, while births and deaths accounted for 4.6%.

Most of the population (as of 2000) speaks French (975 or 87.1%) as their first language, German is the second most common (104 or 9.3%) and Portuguese is the third (12 or 1.1%). There are 11 people who speak Italian.

As of 2008, the population was 50.7% male and 49.3% female. The population was made up of 1,328 Swiss men (45.7% of the population) and 144 (5.0%) non-Swiss men. There were 1,294 Swiss women (44.6%) and 138 (4.8%) non-Swiss women. Of the population in the municipality, 326 or about 29.1% were born in Le Mouret and lived there in 2000. There were 519 or 46.4% who were born in the same canton, while 133 or 11.9% were born somewhere else in Switzerland, and 101 or 9.0% were born outside of Switzerland.

As of 2000, children and teenagers (0–19 years old) make up 28% of the population, while adults (20–64 years old) make up 60.4% and seniors (over 64 years old) make up 11.6%.

As of 2000, there were 480 people who were single and never married in the municipality. There were 570 married individuals, 42 widows or widowers and 27 individuals who are divorced.

As of 2000, there were 962 private households in the municipality, and an average of 2.7 persons per household. There were 69 households that consist of only one person and 42 households with five or more people. In 2000, a total of 383 apartments (95.3% of the total) were permanently occupied, while 14 apartments (3.5%) were seasonally occupied and 5 apartments (1.2%) were empty. As of 2009, the construction rate of new housing units was 2.1 new units per 1000 residents. The vacancy rate for the municipality, in 2010, was 0.44%.

The historical population is given in the following chart:

== Heritage sites of national significance ==
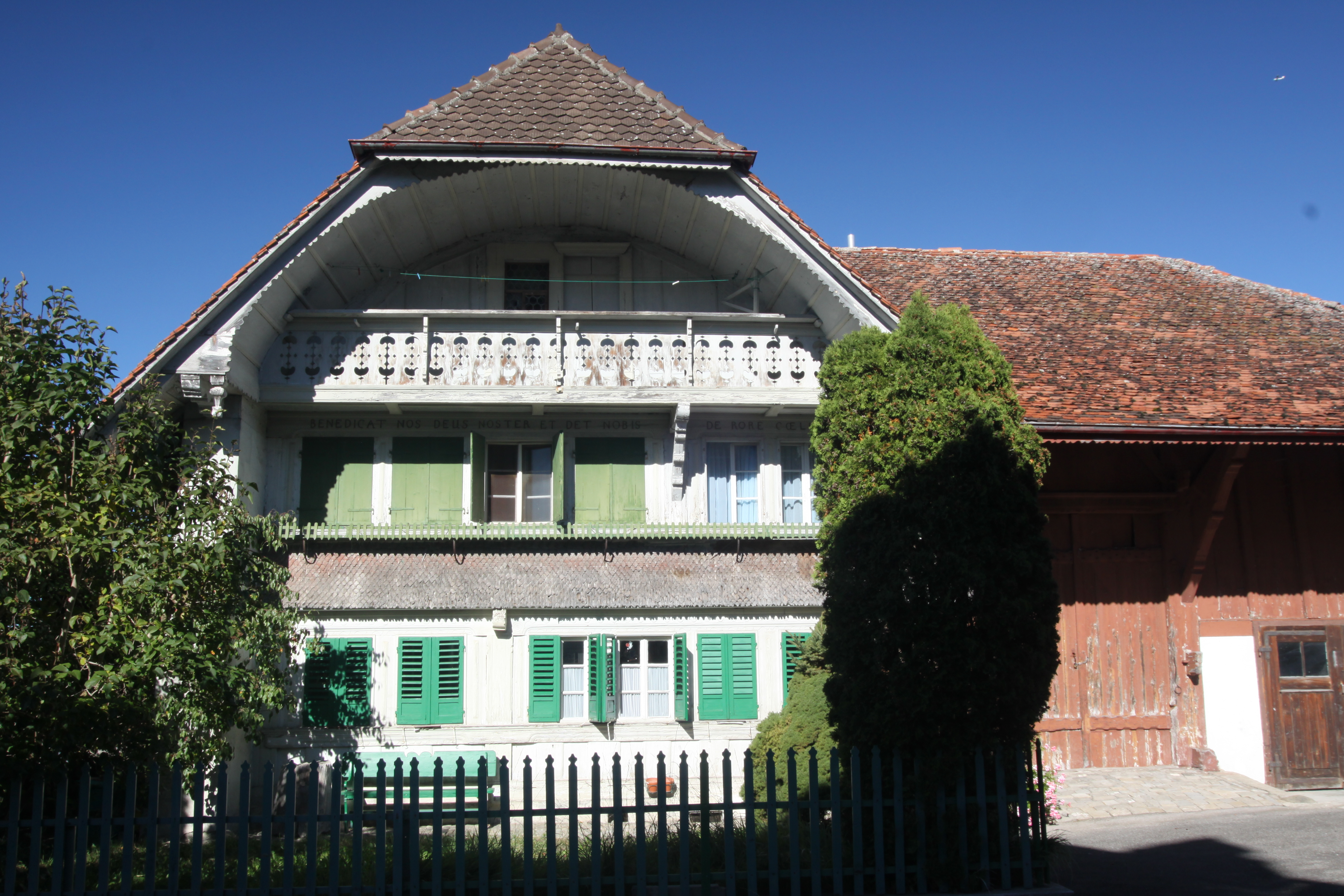
Former Mineral Baths

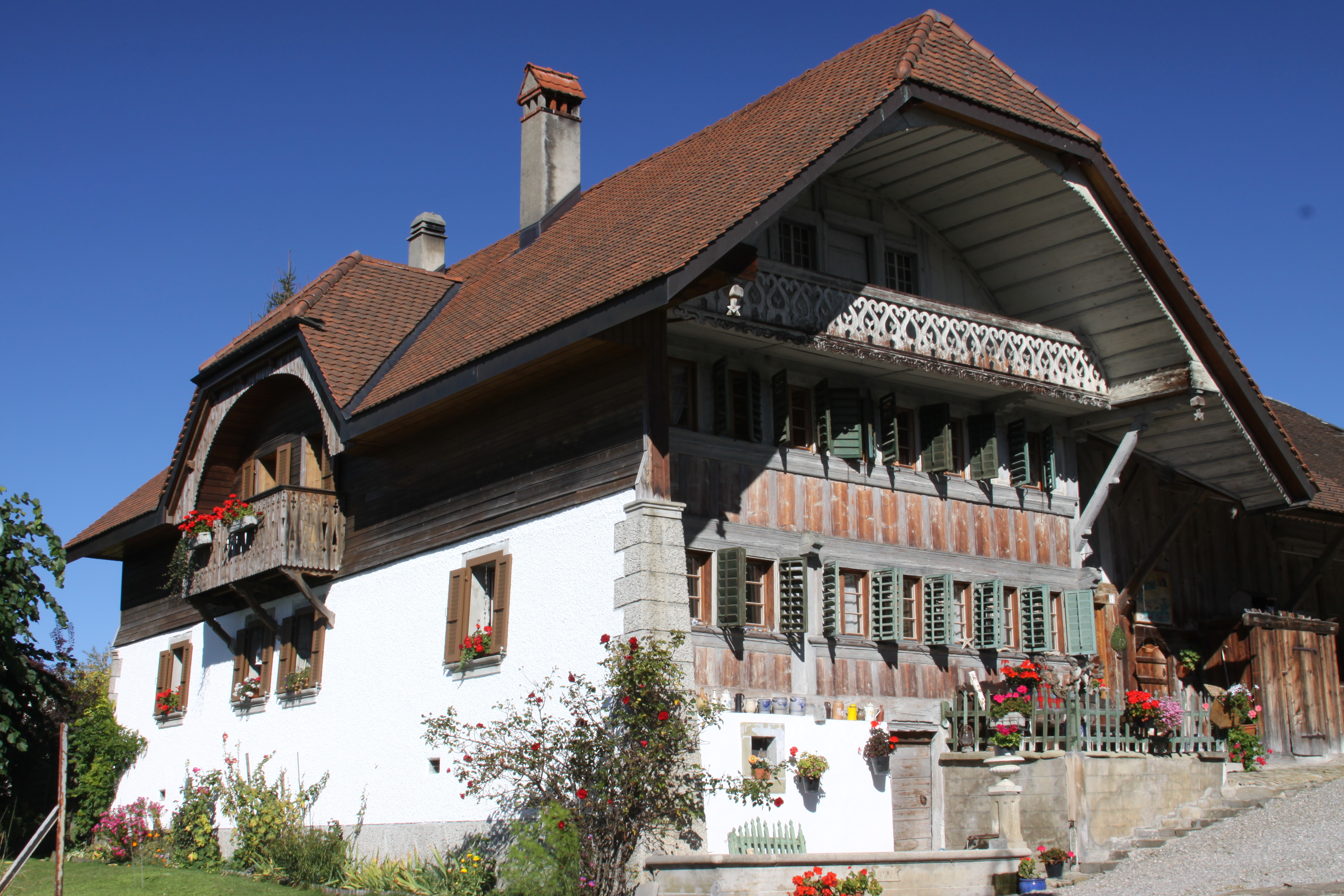
Farm House

The Former Mineral Baths and the farm house in Praroman at Route de l'Eglise 57 are listed as Swiss heritage site of national significance. The entire La Riedera area is part of the Inventory of Swiss Heritage Sites.

== Politics ==
In the 2011 federal election the most popular party was the SVP which received 27.9% of the vote. The next three most popular parties were the SPS (25.8%), the CVP (17.9%) and the FDP (12.6%).

The SVP received about the same percentage of the vote as they did in the 2007 Federal election (26.3% in 2007 vs 27.9% in 2011). The SPS moved from third in 2007 (with 23.5%) to second in 2011, the CVP moved from second in 2007 (with 25.4%) to third and the FDP retained about the same popularity (11.5% in 2007). A total of 909 votes were cast in this election, of which 7 or 0.8% were invalid.

== Economy ==
As of 2010, Le Mouret had an unemployment rate of 2.3%. As of 2008, there were 120 people employed in the primary economic sector and about 46 businesses involved in this sector. 222 people were employed in the secondary sector and there were 23 businesses in this sector. 452 people were employed in the tertiary sector, with 55 businesses in this sector. There were 571 residents of the municipality who were employed in some capacity, of which females made up 42.9% of the workforce.

In 2008 the total number of full-time equivalent jobs was 673. The number of jobs in the primary sector was 91, of which 85 were in agriculture and 6 were in forestry or lumber production. The number of jobs in the secondary sector was 214 of which 59 or (27.6%) were in manufacturing and 155 (72.4%) were in construction. The number of jobs in the tertiary sector was 368. In the tertiary sector; 81 or 22.0% were in wholesale or retail sales or the repair of motor vehicles, 163 or 44.3% were in the movement and storage of goods, 13 or 3.5% were in a hotel or restaurant, 3 or 0.8% were in the information industry, 2 or 0.5% were the insurance or financial industry, 8 or 2.2% were technical professionals or scientists, 69 or 18.8% were in education and 13 or 3.5% were in health care.

In 2000, there were 155 workers who commuted into the municipality and 441 workers who commuted away. The municipality is a net exporter of workers, with about 2.8 workers leaving the municipality for every one entering. Of the working population, 7.8% used public transportation to get to work, and 73.3% used a private car.

== Religion ==
From the 2000 census, 940 or 84.0% were Roman Catholic, while 64 or 5.7% belonged to the Swiss Reformed Church. Of the rest of the population, there were 4 members of an Orthodox church (or about 0.36% of the population), there were 2 individuals (or about 0.18% of the population) who belonged to the Christian Catholic Church, and there were 4 individuals (or about 0.36% of the population) who belonged to another Christian church. 63 (or about 5.63% of the population) belonged to no church, are agnostic or atheist, and 43 individuals (or about 3.84% of the population) did not answer the question.

== Education ==
In Le Mouret about 383 or (34.2%) of the population have completed non-mandatory upper secondary education, and 165 or (14.7%) have completed additional higher education (either university or a Fachhochschule). Of the 165 who completed tertiary schooling, 66.1% were Swiss men, 20.0% were Swiss women, 9.1% were non-Swiss men and 4.8% were non-Swiss women.

The Canton of Fribourg school system provides one year of non-obligatory Kindergarten, followed by six years of Primary school. This is followed by three years of obligatory lower Secondary school where the students are separated according to ability and aptitude. Following the lower Secondary students may attend a three or four year optional upper Secondary school. The upper Secondary school is divided into gymnasium (university preparatory) and vocational programs. After they finish the upper Secondary program, students may choose to attend a Tertiary school or continue their apprenticeship.

During the 2010-11 school year, there were a total of 283 students attending 17 classes in Le Mouret. A total of 585 students from the municipality attended any school, either in the municipality or outside of it. There were 2 kindergarten classes with a total of 32 students in the municipality. The municipality had 12 primary classes and 234 students. During the same year, there were no lower secondary classes in the municipality, but 132 students attended lower secondary school in a neighboring municipality. There were no upper Secondary classes or vocational classes, but there were 76 upper Secondary students and 87 upper Secondary vocational students who attended classes in another municipality. The municipality had 3 special Tertiary classes, with 17 specialized Tertiary students.

As of 2000, there were 39 students in Le Mouret who came from another municipality, while 139 residents attended schools outside the municipality.

== History ==
Since 1982, Le Mouret has been twinned with Saint-Chef in southeast France.
