= Florent of Hainaut =

Prince of Achaea from 1289 to 1297

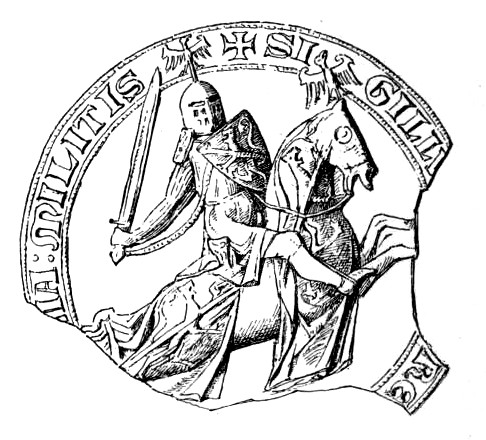
- Seal of Florent of Hainaut

Prince of Achaea
- Reign: 1289–1297
- Predecessor: Charles II
- Successor: Philip of Savoy
- Co-monarch: Isabella
- Born: c. 1255
- Died: 23 January 1297
- Spouse: Isabella of Villehardouin
- Issue: Matilda
- Dynasty: Avesnes
- Father: John I of Avesnes
- Mother: Adelaide of Holland

Florent of Hainaut (also Floris or Florence; Hainaut, also spelt "Hainault") (c. 1255 – 23 January 1297) was Prince of Achaea from 1289 to his death, in right of his wife, Isabella of Villehardouin. He was the son of John I of Avesnes and Adelaide of Holland. From his father, he received the stadholdership (government) of Zeeland.

After he left Zeeland, he took up service with Charles II of Naples, who made him constable of the Kingdom of Naples. After his marriage to Isabella on 16 September 1289, they had one daughter, Matilda. She succeeded him and her mother as princess.

Florent settled with his wife in Morea. He negotiated the Treaty of Glarentsa with the Byzantine Empire in 1290. The situation for the Franks in Greece was hopeless by this time, however. The fall of the Angevins in Sicily meant that they were preoccupied with recouping territory there, and few Western governments would send troops to defend Morea. Florent thus made peace and maintained it until 1293, when the Greeks retook Kalamata. Florent did not despair and did not reopen the war which had been ongoing until his succession: he instead sent an embassy in protest to Andronikos II Palaiologos, and the emperor returned Kalamata. In 1296, the Greeks retook the castle of Saint George in Arcadia. Florent besieged the castle, but died before it could be taken.

== Sources ==
- Bon, Antoine (1969). La Morée franque. Recherches historiques, topographiques et archéologiques sur la principauté d'Achaïe [The Frankish Morea. Historical, Topographic and Archaeological Studies on the Principality of Achaea] (in French). Paris: De Boccard.
- Grousset, René. L'Empire du Levant: Histoire de la Question d'Orient.
- Longnon, Jean (1969) [1962]. "The Frankish States in Greece, 1204–1311". In Setton, Kenneth M.; Wolff, Robert Lee; Hazard, Harry W. (eds.). A History of the Crusades, Volume II: The Later Crusades, 1189–1311. Vol. 2 (Second ed.). Madison, Milwaukee, and London: University of Wisconsin Press. pp. 234–275. ISBN 0-299-04844-6.

Regnal titles
Preceded by Charles II	Prince of Achaea; 1289–1297; With: Isabella of Villehardouin	Vacant Title next held by Philip of Savoy
