= Old Lands (Fribourg) =

Historical territory of Fribourg

Old Lands Anciennes Terres Alte Landschaft
- Territory of Fribourg
- until 1798

The Old Lands (French: Anciennes Terres; German: Alte Landschaft) were the oldest territory of the city of Fribourg, its natural hinterland on both sides of the Sarine and of the language border. The urban commune gradually gained political lordship over it from the 13th to the 15th century. The territory lay between the Sense and the stream of Macconnens, Münchenwiler and the Tütschbach near Plaffeien. Until its end in 1798 the Old Lands never became an organized corporation and had no rights of representation; their successor was the district of Fribourg.

== History ==
The name Old Lands first appears in 1549, to distinguish the territory from the bailiwicks (Vogteien) that the city had acquired in the meantime. Other names were "the 24 parishes" (die 24 Pfarreien) and "immediate jurisdiction" (immediate Botmässigkeit); the latter expresses that the territory was directly subject to the city authorities, without a bailiff (Vogt) in between. In church matters the Old Lands corresponded to the deanery of Fribourg, which was established after the founding of the city. Economically, too, the city as a market center and the countryside were closely bound together.

In building up the territory, the admission of rural outburghers (Ausbürger) was of limited importance, unlike in Bern. The acquisition of fiefs by burghers of the city was more important, especially from the possessions of the Thierstein family (first register 1363). The formation of the Old Lands was completed with the city's purchase of the Thierstein fiefs in 1442, the incorporation of villages of the bailiwick of Hauterive in 1452, and the fixing of the boundary (Landmark) with Bern in 1467.

Before 1404 the Old Lands were attached to the city's three quarters, and afterwards to its four quarters. They were divided into four banners (Panner): the Auge (Aupanner) and Bourg (Burgpanner) banners east of the Sarine, and the Hospital (Spitalpanner) and Neuveville (Neustadtpanner) banners west of it. Beyond the military organization, the city's bannerets (Venner) held governmental functions. Besides the general territorial and feudal law, the law of the city was in force. The parishes were divided into electoral districts (Schrote), and there were village courts; high justice lay with the lord of the city or with the city itself. Under the Ancien régime the city's patriciate built numerous country houses in the Old Lands, whose population supported the patrician government until its end.

== Bibliography ==
- P. de Zurich, "Les 'anciennes terres' de Fribourg", in Nouvelles Étrennes fribourgeoises 75, 1942, 22–31
- P. Boschung, "Die Alte Landschaft Freiburg", in Beiträge zur Heimatkunde des Sensebezirks 52, 1982/83, 253–294
