= La Roche, Fribourg =

La Roche
- Municipality
- Coat of arms
- Location of La Roche
- Location within Switzerland Location within Canton of Fribourg
- Coordinates: 46°42′N 7°8′E
- Country: Switzerland
- Canton: Fribourg
- District: Gruyère

Government
  - Mayor: Syndic

Area
  - Total: 24.03 km^{2} (9.28 sq mi)
- Elevation: 747 m (2,451 ft)

Population (December 2020)
  - Total: 1,821
  - Density: 75.78/km^{2} (196.3/sq mi)
- Time zone: UTC+01:00 (CET)
  - Summer (DST): UTC+02:00 (CEST)
- Postal code: 1634
- SFOS number: 2149
- ISO 3166 code: CH-FR
- Surrounded by: Hauteville, Le Mouret, Plasselb, Pont-la-Ville, Treyvaux, Val-de-Charmey
- Website: www.la-roche.ch

La Roche (French: [la ʁɔʃ], Arpitan: La Rotse [la ˈʁɔtsə]) is a municipality in the district of Gruyère in the canton of Fribourg in Switzerland.

== History ==
La Roche is first mentioned in 1134 as de Rocha. The municipality was formerly known by its German name Zurflüh, however, that name is no longer used.

== Geography ==
La Roche has an area, as of 2009, of 24.1 square kilometers (9.3 mi^{2}). Of this area, 11.32 km^{2} (4.37 mi^{2}) or 47.0% is used for agricultural purposes, while 11.3 km^{2} (4.4 mi^{2}) or 46.9% is forested. Of the rest of the land, 0.97 km^{2} (0.37 mi^{2}) or 4.0% is settled (buildings or roads), 0.14 km^{2} (35 acres) or 0.6% is either rivers or lakes and 0.31 km^{2} (0.12 mi^{2}) or 1.3% is unproductive land.

Of the built up area, housing and buildings made up 2.1% and transportation infrastructure made up 1.4%. Out of the forested land, 43.9% of the total land area is heavily forested and 3.0% is covered with orchards or small clusters of trees. Of the agricultural land, 1.0% is used for growing crops and 25.9% is pastures and 19.9% is used for alpine pastures. All the water in the municipality is flowing water.

The municipality is located in the Gruyère district. It consists of five large hamlets; La Serbache, Scherwyl, Le Villaret, l'Adrey and Le Revers.

== Coat of arms ==
The blazon of the municipal coat of arms is Azure three Pine Trees Vert trunked proper issuant from as many Mounts of the second and in chief as many Mullets of Five Argent.

== Demographics ==
La Roche has a population (as of December 2020) of 1,821. As of 2008, 11.6% of the population are resident foreign nationals. Over the last 10 years (2000–2010) the population has changed at a rate of 9.6%. Migration accounted for 7.5%, while births and deaths accounted for 2.3%.

Most of the population (as of 2000) speaks French (1,219 or 92.5%) as their first language, German is the second most common (46 or 3.5%) and Portuguese is the third (31 or 2.4%). There are 3 people who speak Italian.

As of 2008, the population was 49.3% male and 50.7% female. The population was made up of 627 Swiss men (43.4% of the population) and 85 (5.9%) non-Swiss men. There were 646 Swiss women (44.7%) and 87 (6.0%) non-Swiss women. Of the population in the municipality, 630 or about 47.8% were born in La Roche and lived there in 2000. There were 377 or 28.6% who were born in the same canton, while 110 or 8.3% were born somewhere else in Switzerland, and 130 or 9.9% were born outside of Switzerland.

As of 2000, children and teenagers (0–19 years old) make up 27.4% of the population, while adults (20–64 years old) make up 56.8% and seniors (over 64 years old) make up 15.8%.

As of 2000, there were 569 people who were single and never married in the municipality. There were 601 married individuals, 91 widows or widowers and 57 individuals who are divorced.

As of 2000, there were 467 private households in the municipality, and an average of 2.7 persons per household. There were 124 households that consist of only one person and 58 households with five or more people. In 2000, a total of 449 apartments (79.0% of the total) were permanently occupied, while 91 apartments (16.0%) were seasonally occupied and 28 apartments (4.9%) were empty. As of 2009, the construction rate of new housing units was 2.8 new units per 1000 residents. The vacancy rate for the municipality, in 2010, was 2.22%.

The historical population is given in the following chart:

== Heritage sites of national significance ==
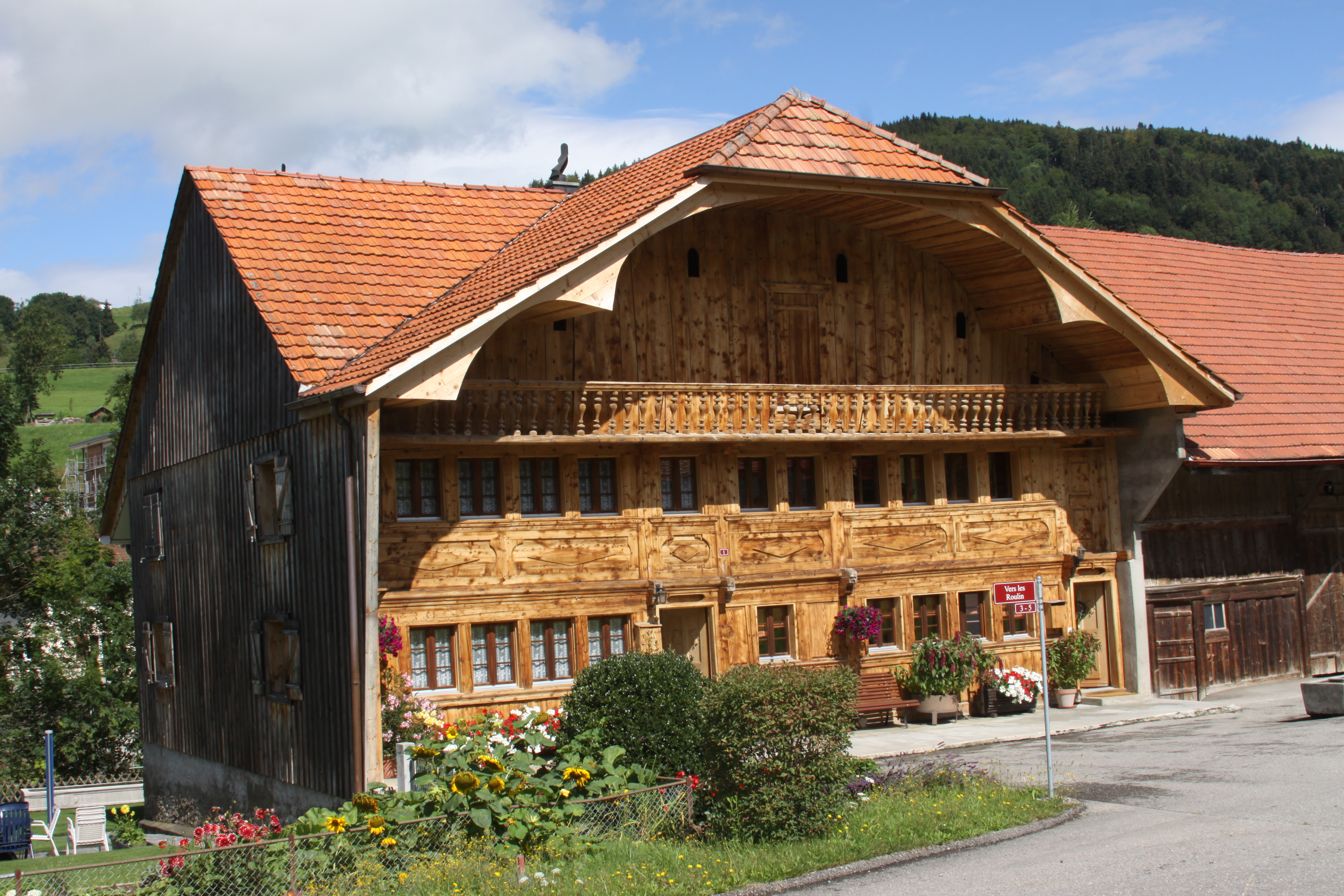
Farm House at Vers Les Roulin 52

The Farm House at Vers Les Roulin 52 is listed as a Swiss heritage site of national significance.

== Politics ==
In the 2011 federal election the most popular party was the SVP which received 30.0% of the vote. The next three most popular parties were the CVP (24.2%), the SP (19.5%) and the FDP (16.2%).

The SVP improved their position in La Roche rising to first, from second in 2007 (with 27.2%) The CVP moved from first in 2007 (with 32.8%) to second in 2011, the SPS moved from fourth in 2007 (with 14.9%) to third and the FDP moved from third in 2007 (with 16.1%) to fourth. A total of 446 votes were cast in this election, of which 5 or 1.1% were invalid.

== Economy ==
As of 2010, La Roche had an unemployment rate of 3.1%. As of 2008, there were 90 people employed in the primary economic sector and about 39 businesses involved in this sector. 256 people were employed in the secondary sector and there were 16 businesses in this sector. 244 people were employed in the tertiary sector, with 37 businesses in this sector. There were 640 residents of the municipality who were employed in some capacity, of which females made up 41.7% of the workforce.

In 2008 the total number of full-time equivalent jobs was 486. The number of jobs in the primary sector was 66, of which 65 were in agriculture and 1 was in forestry or lumber production. The number of jobs in the secondary sector was 243 of which 62 or (25.5%) were in manufacturing and 181 (74.5%) were in construction. The number of jobs in the tertiary sector was 177. In the tertiary sector; 41 or 23.2% were in wholesale or retail sales or the repair of motor vehicles, 19 or 10.7% were in the movement and storage of goods, 29 or 16.4% were in a hotel or restaurant, 3 or 1.7% were the insurance or financial industry, 9 or 5.1% were technical professionals or scientists, 8 or 4.5% were in education and 51 or 28.8% were in health care.

In 2000, there were 181 workers who commuted into the municipality and 378 workers who commuted away. The municipality is a net exporter of workers, with about 2.1 workers leaving the municipality for every one entering. Of the working population, 6.9% used public transportation to get to work, and 66.9% used a private car.

== Religion ==
From the 2000 census, 1,118 or 84.8% were Roman Catholic, while 51 or 3.9% belonged to the Swiss Reformed Church. Of the rest of the population, there were 6 members of an Orthodox church (or about 0.46% of the population), there were 2 individuals (or about 0.15% of the population) who belonged to the Christian Catholic Church, and there were 16 individuals (or about 1.21% of the population) who belonged to another Christian church. There were 27 (or about 2.05% of the population) who were Islamic. There was 1 person who was Buddhist and 1 individual who belonged to another church. 38 (or about 2.88% of the population) belonged to no church, are agnostic or atheist, and 66 individuals (or about 5.01% of the population) did not answer the question.

== Education ==
In La Roche about 352 or (26.7%) of the population have completed non-mandatory upper secondary education, and 84 or (6.4%) have completed additional higher education (either university or a Fachhochschule). Of the 84 who completed tertiary schooling, 58.3% were Swiss men, 23.8% were Swiss women, 7.1% were non-Swiss men and 10.7% were non-Swiss women.

The Canton of Fribourg school system provides one year of non-obligatory Kindergarten, followed by six years of Primary school. This is followed by three years of obligatory lower Secondary school where the students are separated according to ability and aptitude. Following the lower Secondary students may attend a three or four year optional upper Secondary school. The upper Secondary school is divided into gymnasium (university preparatory) and vocational programs. After they finish the upper Secondary program, students may choose to attend a Tertiary school or continue their apprenticeship.

During the 2010-11 school year, there were a total of 125 students attending 7 classes in La Roche. A total of 268 students from the municipality attended any school, either in the municipality or outside of it. There was one kindergarten class with a total of 19 students in the municipality. The municipality had 6 primary classes and 106 students. During the same year, there were no lower secondary classes in the municipality, but 63 students attended lower secondary school in a neighboring municipality. There were no upper Secondary classes or vocational classes, but there were 32 upper Secondary students and 49 upper Secondary vocational students who attended classes in another municipality. The municipality had no non-university Tertiary classes, but there was one non-university Tertiary student and 3 specialized Tertiary students who attended classes in another municipality.

As of 2000, there were 25 students in La Roche who came from another municipality, while 95 residents attended schools outside the municipality.
