= Praroman =

Coordinates: 46.750002°N 7.183334°E

Praroman is a locality in the canton of Fribourg, Switzerland. An independent municipality in the district of Sarine, it merged with neighboring municipalities in 2003 to form Le Mouret.

Aerial view (1964)
