= William II of Holland =

King of Germany from 1247 to 1256

William
- Effigy of William on his seal

King of Germany (formally King of the Romans)
- Reign: 3 October 1247 – 28 January 1256
- Coronation: 1 November 1248, Aachen
- Predecessor: Conrad IV, Henry IV
- Successor: Richard
- Born: February 1227
- Died: 28 January 1256 (aged 28)
- Spouse: Elisabeth of Brunswick-Lüneburg
- Issue: Floris V, Count of Holland
- House: Holland (Gerulfings)
- Father: Floris IV, Count of Holland
- Mother: Matilda of Brabant

William II (February 1227 – 28 January 1256) was the Count of Holland and Zeeland from 1234 until his death. He was elected anti-king of Germany in 1248 and ruled as sole king from 1254 onwards.

== Early life ==
William was the eldest son and heir of Count Floris IV of Holland and Matilda of Brabant. When his father was killed at a tournament at Corbie, William was only seven years old. His paternal uncles William and Otto, bishop of Utrecht, were his guardians until 1239.

== Kingship ==
With the help of his maternal uncle Duke Henry II of Brabant and the Cologne archbishop Konrad von Hochstaden, William was elected king of Germany after Emperor Frederick II was excommunicated by Pope Innocent IV. He succeeded Landgrave Henry Raspe of Thuringia who had died within a year after his election as anti-king in 1246.

The next year, William decided to extend his father's hunting residence to a palace which met his new status. This would later be called the Binnenhof (Inner Court) and was the beginning of the city of The Hague. Meanwhile, William besieged Aachen for six months before capturing it from Frederick's followers. Only then could he be crowned as king by Archbishop Konrad of Cologne. He gained a certain amount of theoretical support from some of the German princes after his marriage to Elizabeth, daughter of the Welf duke Otto of Brunswick-Lüneburg, on 25 January 1252. He was elected as King of the Romans a second time on 25 March 1252 at Brunswick. The electors were the Archbishops of Cologne, Mainz and Trier, the Margrave of Brandenburg and the Duke of Saxony. The Count Palatine Otto II, who was also Duke of Bavaria, was excluded from taking part in the election on the ground that, as a supporter of Conrad IV, he was under sentence of excommunication. After the election, the King of Bohemia sent ambassadors conveying his consent to it. However, although "William lacked neither courage nor chivalrous qualities... his power never extended beyond the Rhineland."In his home county, William fought with Countess Margaret II of Flanders for control of Zeeland. As king of Germany, he made himself count of Zeeland. In July 1253, he defeated the Flemish army at Westkapelle (in Zeeland) and a year later a pause in hostilities followed. His anti-Flemish policy worsened his relationship with France. From 1254 to his death he fought a number of wars against the West Frisians. He built some strong castles in Heemskerk and Haarlem and created roads for the war against the Frisians.

William gave city rights to Haarlem, Delft, 's-Gravenzande and Alkmaar. According to the Annales Wormatienses, on 10 November 1255 William "eliminated the rights of citizens who are called Pfahlbürger so that among other restrictions, none of the cities were permitted to have them or receive them"; a later scribe added a gloss to clarify that the Pfahlburgers "were citizens who were not resident in the city".

== Marriage and issue ==
William married Elisabeth of Brunswick-Lüneburg, daughter of Otto the Child, Duke of Brunswick-Lüneburg, in 1252. They had a son, Floris V (1254 – 1296).

== Death ==
In battle near Hoogwoud on 28 January 1256, William tried to traverse a frozen lake by himself, because he was lost, but his horse fell through the ice. In this vulnerable position, William was killed by the Frisians, who secretly buried him under the floor of a house. His body was recovered 26 years later by his son Floris V, who took terrible vengeance on the West-Frisians. William was then buried in Middelburg. Contemporary sources, including the chronicle of Melis Stoke, portray William as an Arthurian hero. A golden statue of William can be found on the Binnenhof in The Hague, the inner court of the parliamentary complex of the Netherlands.

== See also ==
- Counts of Holland family tree

William II of Holland House of Holland Born: February 1228 Died: 28 January 1256
Regnal titles
Preceded by Floris IV	Count of Holland; 19 July 1234 – 28 January 1256	Succeeded by Floris V
Preceded by Henry Raspe (as anti-king)	King of Germany; 3 October 1247 – 28 January 1256 (anti-king to Conrad IV until 21 May 1254)	Succeeded by Richard of Cornwall and Alfonso of Castile
