= List of feudal wars 12th–14th century =

This is a chronological list of feudal wars spanning from 1100 to 1400 during what can be considered the golden age of feudalism. Usually the wars will be caused by conflicting dynastic claims but also be fought over a variety of other normally personal casus belli. Feudal wars were considered to be a lawful practice if they respected the given feudal contract. In most countries it was traditionally considered the right of the nobility to fight personal feuds without incurring legal penalties, however the Kingdom of England was an exception due to its high level of royal power which could even go so far as to restrict tournaments. In France war was declared by sending a symbol to the enemy, normally a glove. Also in France relatives as far as the seventh degree were supposed to be drawn into the conflict but this was hardly ever the case especially when relatives of this kinship could be related to both families or live so far from the conflict that it was completely impractical for them to join. French customs relating to feudal warfare were adopted elsewhere. Usually feudal wars would involve both parties plundering each other's territories, skirmishes, sieges, and occasionally full battles. Feudal wars were also marked by their lack of casualties and often there was a fine line between a tournament and a feudal war (In 1119 Orderic Vitalis recounts that in a battle of 900 knights he knows of only three who died). Often the leaders and participants of the feudal wars were related to some degree which helps explain the lack of casualties (to slay kin was considered much worse than to kill someone unrelated). As a result, the, generally smaller the war was the smaller the percent of casualties it was likely to have (this also goes into the idea of genus or race).

== List of wars ==
This list will not include religious wars because they are induced by ideological rather than personal or familial conflict.

- Counts of Bilstein vs Counts of Northeim 1105–1110 – Conflict between the counts of Northeim and the Counts of Bilstein in which the Counts of Northeim destroyed the first Bilstein castle
- War of the Flemish succession (1127–1128) 1127–1228 – William Clito fought against Thierry, Count of Flanders for the county of Flanders
- Battle of São Mamede 1128 – Battle which established Portugal's independence as a kingdom. Portuguese forces led by Afonso Henriques defeated forces led by his mother Teresa of Portugal and her lover Fernão Peres de Trava. Following São Mamede, the future king styled himself "Prince of Portugal".
- West Frisian Wars 1132–1297 – Series of wars asserting the Count of Holland's dominance over West Friesland
- The Anarchy – The Anarchy was a civil war in England and Normandy between 1135 and 1153, which resulted in a widespread breakdown in law and order. The conflict was a war of succession precipitated by the accidental death of William Adelin, the only legitimate son of King Henry I, who drowned in the sinking of the White Ship in 1120. Henry sought to be succeeded by his daughter, known as Empress Matilda, but was only partially successful in convincing the nobility to support her. On Henry's death in 1135, his nephew Stephen of Blois seized the throne, with the help of Stephen's brother Henry of Blois, who was the Bishop of Winchester. Stephen's early reign saw fierce fighting with disloyal English barons, rebellious Welsh leaders, and Scottish invaders. Following a major rebellion in the south-west of England, Matilda invaded in 1139 with the help of her half-brother Robert of Gloucester.
- Grimbergen Wars 1139–1159 – the battle between the counts of Leuven and the Berthout family, lords of Grimbergen and Mechelen from 1139 to 1159 . The war ended with the destruction of the fortress of the Berthouts, who became loyal vassals of the duke.
- Baussenque Wars 1144–1162 – Series of wars between the House of Barcelona (then ruling in the county of Provence) and the house of House of Baux
- Battle of Lobregal 1160 – Climax of a feud between the de Castro and de Lara families over the regency for the kingdom of Castile
- Battle of Huete 1164 – Another battle in the de Castro de Lara feud which the de Laras lost
- Tübingen Feud 1164–1166 – Hugo II, Count Palatine of Tübingen punished Robber barons one of which was associated with the House of Welf. Welf VII demanded satisfaction for the insult and Hugo sent his defiance. Hugo had powerful allies including the bishops of Augsburg, Speyer, and worms and the Berthold IV, Duke of Zähringen. On Sunday, September 6, 1164, a skirmish turned into an unplanned battle in which the Guelph side was defeated. Ultimately Hugo was unable to win against such a powerful foe and when the Emperor intervened on behalf of Welf VII he had to prostrate himself three times to Welf.
- Flemish–Hollandic conflict over Zeeland Bewestenschelde 1165–1323 – Series of conflicts between the counts of Flanders and the Counts of Holland over
- Flemish wars with Holland over Zeeland and Friesland 1166–1167 – Wars between the two counts first over Zeeland in 1166–1167, and later over Friesland.
- Siege of Zorita de los Canes 1169 – Early in the reign of Alfonso VIII of Castile Fernando Rodríguez de Castro holds Zorita through is castellan Lope de Arenas in defiance of the king who was a child at the time. The king enlists the help of the Count Nuño Pérez de Lara exile Leonese Count Ponce de Minerva but they are both captured through a violation of safe conduct. Eventually the town surrenders and is donated to the Order of Calatrava
- Civil war era in Norway 1130–1240; Many different wars between several different parties of nobility vying for the throne of Norway. The main two parties which emerge are the Bagler (Croziermen; mostly landowning nobles and clergy), and the Birkebeiner (Mostly household Retainers, peasants, and men living on the eastern marches of Norway)
- Revolt of 1173–1174 – The Revolt of 1173–1174 was a rebellion against King Henry II of England by three of his sons, his wife Eleanor of Aquitaine, and their rebel supporters. The revolt ended in failure after eighteen months; Henry's rebellious family members had to resign themselves to his continuing rule and were reconciled to him.
- Imperial war Against Heinrich the Lion 1180-1181 - A punitive war against the Welf Duke of Saxony for disrespecting Imperial authority, the Welf Duke ends up submitting
- Flemish–Hollandic conflict over Zeeland Bewestenschelde 1186–1265 –
- 1191–1195
- Bogen-Wittelsbach war for Regensburg 1192; Count Albert III von Bogen fought a coalition of nobles including Imperial County of Ortenburg, von Kraiburg, and the House of Wittelsbachs dukes of Bavaria over several fiefs on the Danube along with the Burgraviate of Regensburg (Governorship). His powerful alliance to the Kingdom of Bohemia through his marriage with princess Ludmilla of Bohemia must have contributed to his success in the war. Although the Bogenbergs won the war in combat, the emperor's threats were enough to conclude the war in a way which was detrimental to the von Bogen
- Logudoro-Cagliari War 1194–1198; Complex war between Giudices in Sardinia
- County of Vianden war against Archbishopric of Trier for the Castle Arras 1195–1197 – War to reclaim a castle for the county of Vianden by Friedrich III, Count of Vianden ends in Trier victory.
- German throne dispute 1197–1215 – a political conflict in the Holy Roman Empire from 1198 to 1215. This dispute between the House of Hohenstaufen and House of Welf was over the successor to Emperor Henry VI who had just died. After a conflict lasting 17 years the Hohenstaufen Frederick II prevailed.
- Freiburg Noble Uprising 1198; Berthold V, Duke of Zähringen crushes a noble uprising in Freiburg im Breisgau
- Battle of Waschow 1200 – Count Adolf von Dassel was defeated by king Canute VI of Denmark losing the county of Ratzeburg
- War of the Antiochene Succession 1201–1219 – The War of the Antiochene Succession comprised a series of armed conflicts in northern Syria between 1201 and 1219, connected to the disputed succession of Bohemond III of Antioch.
- Liégeois–Brabantian Wars 1202 –
- French invasion of Normandy (1202–1204); Following John, King of England's decision to steal Isabella of Angoulême from Hugh IX of Lusignan and wed her in order to take over Angoulême Hugh complained to the king of France who decided to revoke much of John's land in France as a punishment for his tyrannical actions (Isabella was already engaged to Hugh IX before John decided to marry her). The French were able to conquer Normandy impressively quickly despite a resistance lead in part by William Marshal, 1st Earl of Pembroke (Often known as the greatest knight who ever lived)
- Loon War 1203–1206 – The Loon War (Dutch: Loonse Oorlog) was a war of succession over the County of Holland (and its dependency Zeeland) from 1203 until 1206, brought on by the death of count Dirk VII. The war was waged between Dirk's brother William of Frisia, and Dirk's daughter Ada who had quickly married count Louis II of Loon.
- Capetian conquest of Auvergne 1210–1213; After Guy II d'Auvergne count of Auvergne attacks an abbey and is excommunicated Philip II of France uses this as an excuse to declare war on him and take the majority of his lands.
- First Battle of Ulrichen 1211 – Berthold V, Duke of Zähringen is defeated despite having a massive army by Savoyards while trying to expand his duchy east.
- Portuguese Succession war of 1211 – The will of the previous king of Portugal grants important castles to king Afonso II of Portugal's sisters, he objects to it and many nobles are exiled
- Welsh uprising of 1211 1211 – The Welsh uprising of 1211 was a rebellion by several Welsh princes, orchestrated by Llywelyn ap Iorwerth with primary support from Gwenwynwyn of Powys, Maelgwn ap Rhys, Madog ap Gruffydd Maelor and Maredudd ap Robert against King John of England
- Battle of Steppes 1213 – Feudal war of the castle of Moha after the last of the counts of Moha died out the duke of Brabant Henry I, Duke of Brabant fights Louis II, Count of Loon, Bishop Hugues de Pierrepont, and Henry III, Duke of Limburg. The battle is a disaster for the Duke of Brabant who loses more than half his army and only kills 200 of the enemy and results in the loss of the castle to the Bishopric of Liège.
- Anglo-French War (1213–1214) – Anti-French expansion coalition led by John, King of England, Pope Innocent III, Otto IV, Holy Roman Emperor, Renaud I, Count of Dammartin, and Henry I, Duke of Brabant declare war on Philip II of France and the kingdom of France in order to regain Normandy for King John which he had lost in 1204. The Pope felt threatened by the alliance emerging between Philip Augustus and Frederick II, Holy Roman Emperor who were both considered at the time to be extremely successful and powerful kings. On the other hand Otto IV, Holy Roman Emperor was trying to consolidate his position as Emperor against the claims of Frederick II who also claimed to be the Emperor. Additionally the House of Welf had traditionally got along well with the Papacy and the kingdom of England so it was a natural alliance. Renaud was originally a powerful friend and vassal of the king of France but fell out with him over a dispute with Philip of Dreux, subsequently paying homage to King John in 1212. The duke of Brabant was a vassal of the Holy Roman Empire and had chosen to support Otto over Frederick II. The conflict culminated at the Battle of Bouvines which was a French victory.
- First Barons' War 1215–1217; Feudal war against the tyranny of John, King of England led by Robert Fitzwalter with a foreign army under Louis VIII of France landing in England to help the rebels
- War of the Succession of Champagne 1216–1222; Erard of Brienne-Ramerupt a champagne nobleman who married a daughter of the count of champagne unsuccessfully presses a claim against Blanche of Navarre, Countess of Champagne. Having the support of a good portion of the Champagne nobility and the Theobald I, Duke of Lorraine Erard is unable to face the overwhelming international support which Blanche receives from Philip II of France, Frederick II, Holy Roman Emperor, Odo III, Duke of Burgundy, and Pope Innocent III. Despite losing the war Erard greatly enhances his prestige and wealth through caravan raids and a favorable peace treaty
- War of the Succession of Breda 1226–1232 –
- County of Weimar vs the Landgrave of Thuringia and the County of Orlamunde 1223–1227 – Albert of Orlamunde inherited the county of Orlamunde and his brother Herman II inherited the county of Weimar; Albert served his relative king Valdemar II of Denmark as count of Holstein and was absent from Orlamunde during which time his brother tried to invade Orlamunde. Albert's father in law was the Landgrave of Thuringia a very powerful sovereign who fought against Herman in Albert's absence.
- Bishop of Wurzburg feud with the House of Henneberg 1222 – Feud over the city of Meiningen
- William II Marshal's Campaign Against Llywelyn the Great 1223 – William Marshal has a successful campaign against the Prince of Wales
- von Luternau vs St. Urban Abbey 1226 – Werner I. von Luternau attacks Saint Urban's Abbey over rights for Langenthal
- de Clare-Afan Feud 1217–1228 – When Gilbert de Clare, 5th Earl of Gloucester married the widow of John, King of England he came into armed conflict with Morgan Gam a Welsh lord whose father had previously held Newcastle Castle, Bridgend under King John but now de Clare claimed it from his marriage to King John's widow. Gam was captured but was later released and later supported Richard Marshal, 3rd Earl of Pembroke's failed revolt.
- William II Marshal's counter-campaign against Hugh de Lacy, 1st Earl of Ulster 1224–1226 – Successful defense of his lands against Hugh de Lacy
- Danish-Holstein War 1225–1227 – Adolf IV of Holstein leads a successful war against the kingdom of Denmark to regain the county of Schleswig which had been taken from his father by Valdemar II of Denmark at the Battle of Stellau in 1201. Adolf won the war by taking the King of Denmark prisoner after winning the Battle of Bornhöved (1227).
- Battle of Ane 1227 – Viscount Rudolph van Coevorden led an army which included peasants from Drenthe against his liege the bishop Utrecht because in the context of his attempts to curtail the bishops power he had forced the bishop to take action against him; despite his reliance on peasants Rudolph won the battle
- War of the Lombards 1228–1243 – a civil war in the Kingdom of Jerusalem and the Kingdom of Cyprus between the "Lombards" (also called the imperialists), the representatives of the Emperor Frederick II, largely from Lombardy, and the Eastern aristocracy led first by the Ibelins and then by the Montforts. The war was provoked by Frederick's attempt to control the regency for his young son, Conrad II of Jerusalem.
- Dernbach Feud – The Dernbach Feud was an over 100-year-long (c. 1230 – 1333) ongoing dispute in present-day Germany between the House of Nassau, several knightly families, and the Landgrave of Hesse. The conflict erupted mainly over property rights in Herborn and the surrounding area.
- War of Friends 1231–1234 – Jean de Apremont Bishop of Metz and his allies Matthias II, Duke of Lorraine, Henry II, Count of Bar lose a three-year war with the City of Metz over self-autonomy led by Roger de Heu a prominent patrician of Metz
- The Marshal War 1233–1241 – A war which was born from Earl Richard Marshal offering refuge in his castle to the baron Gilbert Basset who Bishop Peter des Roches and Peter de Maulay (royal advisors) had tried to take a manor off of. The war originally took place in the Welsh marches but with no popular support there Richard went to Ireland. At the Battle of the Curragh in 1234 he died at the hands of the Royal commander Maurice FitzGerald, 2nd Lord of Offaly. This would start a feud which would result in several murders and "accidents" including the death of Earl Gilbert Marshal, 4th Earl of Pembroke.
- Saintonge War 1242–1243; part of a larger series of wars between the House of Plantagenet and the House of Capet. Henry III of England's brother is pitted against Alphonse, Count of Poitiers over the county of Poitiers. Despite Henry III and his brother having support of many of the barons in Poitiers along with the House of Lusignan and the Count of Toulouse the House of Capet Prevails.
- War of the Flemish Succession 1244–1254 – a series of feudal conflicts in the mid-thirteenth century between the children of Margaret II, Countess of Flanders. They concerned the succession to the countship of two counties, one a fief of the King of France (Flanders) and one a fief of the King of Germany (Hainault).
- War of the Thuringian Succession 1247–1264 – War over a successor to the last Landgrave of Thuringia for control of the state of Thuringia.
- War of the Euboeote Succession 1256–1258 – Fought between the Prince of Achaea, William II of Villehardouin, and a broad coalition of other rulers from throughout Frankish Greece who felt threatened by William's aspirations. The war was sparked by William's attempt to gain control of a third of the island of Euboea, which was resisted by the local Lombard barons with the aid of the Republic of Venice. The Lord of Athens and Thebes, Guy I de la Roche, also entered the war against William, along with other barons of Central Greece. Their defeat at the Battle of Karydi in May/June 1258 effectively brought the war to an end in an Achaean victory, although a definite peace treaty was not concluded until 1262
- War of Saint Sabas 1256–1270 – War between the rival Italian maritime republics of Genoa (aided by Philip of Montfort, Lord of Tyre, John of Arsuf, and the Knights Hospitaller) and Venice (aided by the Count of Jaffa and Ascalon and the Knights Templar), over control of Acre, in the Kingdom of Jerusalem
- Friso-Hollandic Wars 1256–1297 – The Friso-Hollandic Wars, were a series of short medieval wars (ranging from single battles to entire campaigns) consisting of the attempts made by the counts of Holland to conquer the free Frisian territories, which lay to the north and east of their domain.
- Scottish–Norwegian War 1262–1266 – arose because of disagreement over the ownership of the Hebrides. The war contained mainly skirmishes and feuds between the kings, and the only major battle was the indecisive Battle of Largs
- Second Barons' War 1264–1267; Feudal war led by Simon de Montfort, 6th Earl of Leicester in an attempt to empower the council of barons, succeeds at first but eventually the Royal forces change the tide of the war at Battle of Evesham in 1265 where de Montfort was killed.
- Mačva War 1268 – Serbs try to invade Hungarian province of Macva but are repelled
- First wars of Austrian Succession 1246–1278; After the death of the last Babenberg duke of Austria several claimants emerge to grab the duchy including Hohenstaufen, Ottokar II of Bohemia, Vladislaus III of Moravia, Herman VI, Margrave of Baden, Roman Danylovich, Frederick I, Margrave of Baden, until finally passing onto Rudolf I of Germany
- War of the Cow 1272–1278 – A war in the Holy Roman Empire between the Prince-Bishopric of Liège under Bishop John of Enghien and the Marquisate of Namur under Marquis Guy of Dampierre. What began as a dispute over stolen property between a peasant from one jurisdiction and a burgess from another became a major regional conflict requiring the arbitration of King Philip III of France, who ordered the restoration of the status quo ante bellum in 1278
- Manx revolt of 1275 1275 – an uprising on the Isle of Man in 1275, led by Guðrøðr Magnússon. The uprising initially expelled the Scots, who had received the Isle of Man in 1266 by the Treaty of Perth from the Kingdom of Norway. King Alexander III of Scotland responded by sending a large fleet and troops to crush the rebellion.
- Conquest of Wales by Edward I 1277–1283 – resulted in the defeat and annexation of the Principality of Wales, and the other last remaining independent Welsh principalities, by Edward I, King of England.
- The 6000-mark war 1276–1278 – a war between Denmark and Sweden which took place from 1276 to 1278. It started because of a disagreement over an agreed sum of 6,000 silver marks for Danish assistance to Magnus Birgersson in the battle against Valdemar Birgersson in 1275
- War of the Sicilian Vespers 1282–1302 – a conflict that started with the insurrection of the Sicilian Vespers against Charles of Anjou in 1282 and ended in 1302 with the Peace of Caltabellotta. It was fought in Sicily, Catalonia (the Aragonese Crusade) and elsewhere in the western Mediterranean between the kings of Aragon on one side against the Angevin Charles of Anjou, his son Charles II, the kings of France, and the Papacy on the other side. The war resulted in the division of the old Kingdom of Sicily; at Caltabellotta, Charles II was confirmed as king of Sicily's peninsular territories, while Frederick III was confirmed as king of the island territories
- War of the Limburg Succession 1283–1289 – The cause of the War of the Limburg Succession was the death of Waleran IV, Duke of Limburg in 1280, and his only daughter Ermengarde of Limburg in 1283. Waleran IV had no sons and Ermengarde had no children. Ermergarde had married Reginald I of Guelders, who now claimed the Duchy of Limburg. However, Waleran's nephew Adolf VIII of Berg, son of his elder brother Adolf VII of Berg, also claimed the Duchy. Unable to assert his claims, he sold them in 1283 to the mighty John I, Duke of Brabant.
- War of the Outlaws 1289–1296 – was a conflict between two royal families over hereditary demands and special interests and was triggered by the murder of Eric V of Denmark.
- Herlingsberg War 1290 – The Bishopric of Hildesheim went to war with Henry I, Duke of Brunswick-Grubenhagen over his use of the castle of Harliburg and his refusal to give the castle to the bishop. Heinrich had help from the Duke of Brunswick-Luneburg but he was unable to resist the bishop and eventually had to give into his demands.
- Battle of Red Ford 1294 – The battle was fought over disputed lands. It ended in defeat of the Clan Campbell of Lochawe.
- Gascon War – Following an outbreak of piracy and feuds between French and English sailors, Philip IV of France tricked Edmund Crouchback into allowing him to garrison the major fortresses of Aquitaine as a show of good faith. Refusing to return them, he attempted to end English control in Aquitaine for good but was forced by the Battle of the Golden Spurs to accept a return to the status quo in the 1303 Treaty of Paris to curtail English involvement in the Franco-Flemish War. The marriages produced by the treaties ending the war led directly to the claims that began the Hundred Years' War.
- von Boyneburg vs Landgraves of Hesse – The Landgraves of Hesse were invested as Imperial princes receiving the imperial castle of Eschwege however the von Boyneburg's had held that castle as Ministerialis for a long time and resisted this for several generations
- First War of Scottish Independence 1296–1328 – A revolt against English rule in Scotland which had been present since the death of the last king of the House of Dunkeld
- Franco-Flemish War 1297–1305 – Philip IV was eager to strengthen French control over the County of Flanders. Count Guy's attempt to ally with England—then still fighting the Gascon War—allowed Philip to imprison him, his sons, and his daughter. The infantry defeat of French cavalry at Courtrai decimated a generation of French nobility but the end of the Gascon War allowed France to recover, annexing 3 cities and exacting a massive reparations agreement in exchange for allowing Flanders to continue as a vassal domain.
- Mayor Albert's Rebellion 1311–1312 – rebellion by the burghers of the Polish city of Kraków against Duke Władysław I the Elbow-high. The rebellion was led by Albert, the wójt (Latin: advocatus), who under Magdeburg Law was effectively mayor of Kraków. It ended with the victory of Duke Władysław and the punishment of Kraków townsmen.
- Battle of Morgarten 1315 – the men of Schwyz, with support of their allies of Uri and Unterwalden, ambushed a Habsburg army under the command of Duke Leopold I on the shores of Lake Ägeri, in the territory of Schwyz. The Habsburg army was routed, with numerous slain or drowned. The Swiss victory consolidated the League of the Three Forest Cantons, which formed the core of the Swiss Confederacy
- Bruce campaign in Ireland 1315–1318 – a three-year military campaign in Ireland by Edward Bruce, brother of the Scottish king Robert the Bruce. It lasted from his landing at Larne in 1315 to his defeat and death in 1318 at the Battle of Faughart in County Louth. It was part of the First War of Scottish Independence and the conflict between the Irish, Scoto-Normans, and the Hiberno-Normans.
- Despenser War 1321–1322 – a baronial revolt against Edward II of England led by the Marcher Lords Roger Mortimer and Humphrey de Bohun. The rebellion was fuelled by opposition to Hugh Despenser the Younger, the royal favourite. After the rebels' summer campaign of 1321, Edward was able to take advantage of a temporary peace to rally more support and a successful winter campaign in southern Wales, culminating in royal victory at the Battle of Boroughbridge in the north of England in March 1322. Edward's response to victory was his increasingly harsh rule until his fall from power in 1326
- War of Saint-Sardos 1323–1327 – When the French decide to build a bastide in Saint-Sardos the French royal sergeant is killed by the Gascon (English) lord of Montpezat. Following a series of failed diplomatic negotiations the French invade Aquitaine and confiscate it from the king of England.
- War of Metz 1324–1326 – Following a series of quarrels with the city of Metz and mounting debts incurred by its bourgeoisie, King John of Bohemia, his uncle Baldwin, Archbishop of Trier, Edward I, Count of Bar, and Frederick IV, Duke of Lorraine joined to form a coalition to take the city by force. The war was fought chiefly over the possession of land and the obligations, not always respected, of the burgesses as vassals of their lords.
- Friso-Hollandic Wars 1324–1348 – The Friso-Hollandic Wars, were a series of short medieval wars (ranging from single battles to entire campaigns) consisting of the attempts made by the counts of Holland to conquer the free Frisian territories, which lay to the north and east of their domain.
- Wars of the Rügen Succession 1325–1328 – When the last male line of the Princes or Rugen died out the Lords of Mecklenburg fought Vartislav IV of Rugen for the rights to the succession.
- War of Hum (1326–1329) 1326–1329 – between the Banate of Bosnia under Stephen II Kotromanić and the Kingdom of Serbia under Stefan Dečanski Nemanjić.
- Saluzzo Civil War 1330–1334 – Civil war between the brothers Manfred V of Saluzzo and Frederick I of Saluzzo over the inheritance of the March of Saluzzo
- Serbian civil war of 1331 – broke out following King Stefan Uroš III's decision not to continue campaigning against the Byzantine Empire when he had the chance following the victory at the Battle of Velbazhd against Bulgaria, alienating much of the nobility, which became divided supporting either Uroš III or his son, Stefan Dušan
- Eltz Feud 1331–1337 – a 14th-century feud that arose between rulers of the Trier region on the Moselle and certain members of the knightly class who were acting independently and failing to support their sovereign princes.
- Second War of Scottish Independence 1332–1357 – when Edward Balliol, the son of a former Scottish king, led an English backed invasion of Scotland in an attempt to make good his claim to the Scottish throne against that of Robert Bruce's eight-year-old son David II. Balliol's force defeated a Scottish army ten times their size and Balliol took the throne. Within three months the Bruce partisans had regrouped and forced Balliol out of Scotland.
- Wars of the Loon Succession 1336–1366 – war of succession that arose after the childless death of Louis IV, Count of Loon on 22 January 1336. In the first period, the County of Loon led by claimant Diederik of Heinsberg managed to maintain its autonomy in relation to the Prince-Bishopric of Liège. During the second period, however, Arnold of Rummen, the last indigenous claimant to the title of count of Loon, first had to sell the County of Chiny to the Duchy of Luxemburg to cover his military expenses, and soon after conceded defeat. The wars came to an end with the annexation of Loon by Liège in 1366.
- Hundred Years' War 1337–1453 – English try to reclaim the Duchy of Aquitaine and other lands and also try to press a claim to the Kingship of France. Ultimately the French win but the war goes in favor of the English for a long time.
- Battle of Sluys 1340 – The Battle of Sluys was a naval battle fought on 24 June 1340 between England and France as part of the Hundred Years' War
- War of the Brabantian Succession1356–1357 – A war of succession triggered by the death of John III, Duke of Brabant. He had no sons, and as the Duchy of Brabant had a tradition of male (agnatic) primogeniture, his three daughters and their three husbands, namely the dukes of Luxemburg and Guelders and the count of Flanders, claimed (a part of) the inheritance.
- Galicia–Volhynia Wars 1340–1392 – several wars fought in the years 1340–1392 over the succession in the Principality of Galicia–Volhynia (in modern Poland and Ukraine). After Boleslaw-Yuri II was poisoned by local nobles in 1340, both Grand Duchy of Lithuania and Kingdom of Poland advanced claims over the principality
- War of the Breton Succession 1341–1365 – a conflict between the Counts of Blois and the Montforts of Brittany for control of the Sovereign Duchy of Brittany, then a fief of the Kingdom of France.
- Thuringian Counts' War 1342–1346 – a conflict between several ancient aristocratic families and the House of Wettin for supremacy in Thuringia.
- Neapolitan campaigns of Louis the Great 1347–1352 – a war between the Kingdom of Hungary, led by Louis the Great, and the Kingdom of Naples
- Hook and Cod wars 1350–1490 – a series of wars and battles in the County of Holland between 1350 and 1490. Most of these wars were fought over the title of count of Holland, but some have argued that the underlying reason was because of the power struggle of the bourgeoisie in the cities against the ruling nobility.
- Castilian Civil War 1351–1369 – a war of succession over the Crown of Castile that lasted from 1351 to 1369. The conflict started after the death of king Alfonso XI of Castile in March 1350. It became part of the larger conflict then raging between the Kingdom of England and the Kingdom of France: the Hundred Years' War. It was fought primarily in Castile and its coastal waters between the local and allied forces of the reigning king, Peter, and his illegitimate brother Henry of Trastámara over the right to the crown.
- War of the Two Peters 1356–1375 – Territorial war between Aragon and Castille
- County of Neuenahr Succession Dispute 1358–1382 – When the male line of the counts of Neuenahr died out there was a succession dispute
- War of the Bands 1362–1457 – a civil war, really an extended series of blood feuds, in the western Basque Country, Gascony, and Navarre in the Late Middle Ages
- First War of the Guelderian Succession 1371–1379 – A battle for the throne of the Duchy of Guelders that raged between 1371 and 1379.
- War of the Lüneburg Succession 1370–1388 – A war over the succession to the Principality of Lüneburg that broke out in 1370 in north Germany and lasted, with interruptions, for 18 years. After William II of Lüneburg died without male heirs in 1369, the "Older House of Lüneburg" was extinguished. According to the inheritance rules of the House of Welf to which William belonged, the Duke of Brunswick, Magnus II Torquatus, was entitled to succeed. However, Charles IV ruled that this Imperial Fief should be returned to the Empire and enfeoffed Albert of Saxe-Wittenberg and his uncle, Wenceslas with the Principality, thereby triggering the war.
- Lithuanian Civil War (1381–1384) 1381–1384 – the first struggle for power between the cousins Jogaila, Grand Duke of Lithuania and later King of Poland, and Vytautas the Great.
- Civil war in Greater Poland (1382–1385) 1382–1385 –
- 1383–1385 Portuguese interregnum 1383–1385 – a civil war in Portuguese history during which no crowned king of Portugal reigned. The interregnum began when King Ferdinand I died without a male heir and ended when King John I was crowned in 1385 after his victory during the Battle of Aljubarrota
- Dohna Feud 1385–1402 – a 14th-century dispute between the burgraves of Dohna, who resided in the Eastern Ore Mountains of Central Europe, on the one hand and Saxon nobleman, John of Körbitz (Hans von Körbitz) and William I, Margrave of Meissen on the other.
- War of the Cities (1387–1389) 1387–1389 – began as a war between the Swabian League of Cities and the Bavarian dukes 1387–1389. It evolved into a war of influence between the nobility and free cities
- Friso-Hollandic Wars 1396–1411 – a series of short medieval wars (ranging from single battles to entire campaigns) consisting of the attempts made by the counts of Holland to conquer the free Frisian territories, which lay to the north and east of their domain.
- Epiphany Rising 1399–1400 – a failed rebellion against Henry IV of England in early January 1400.
