= Adelaide of Cleves =

Countess of Holland (died 1238)

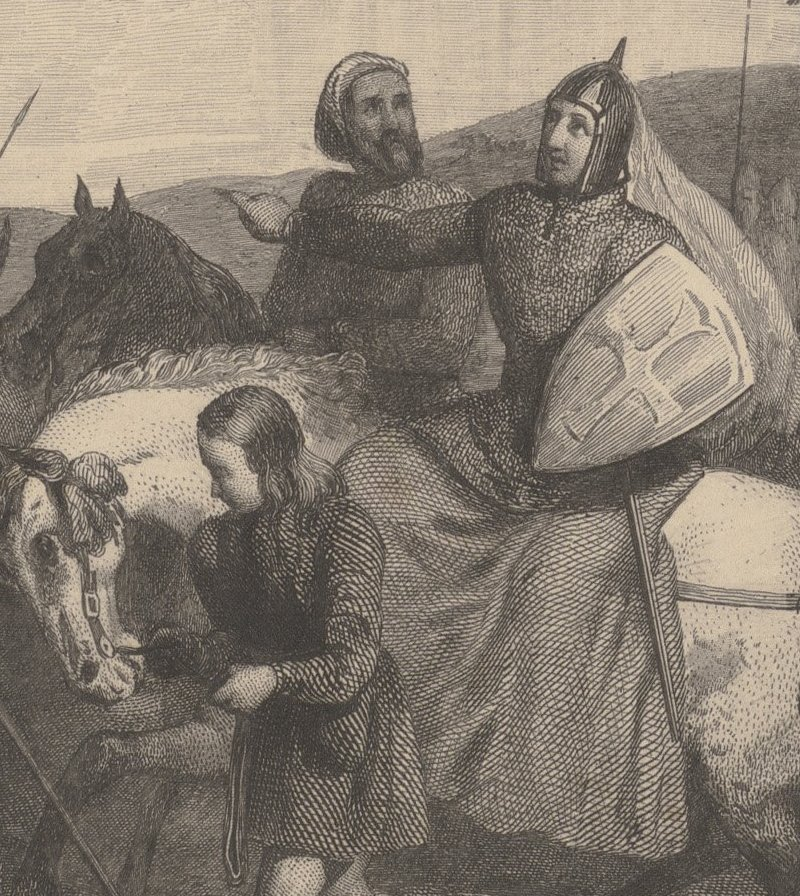
- Aleid on horseback with her army (detail)

Countess of Holland
- Reign: 1190 – 1203
- Predecessor: Ada of Scotland
- Successor: Ada of Holland
- Died: 1238
- Burial: Rijnsburg Abbey
- Spouse: Dirk VII, Count of Holland (m. 1186; died 1203)
- Issue: Aleydis; Petronilla; Ada
- Father: Dietrich II, Count of Cleves
- Mother: Adelaide of Sulzbach

Adelaide of Cleves (died 1238), also known as Aleid and Adelheid, was, by her marriage to Dirk VII, Countess of Holland. She played an important role in the administration during the reign of her husband, during which she served as regent in 1195, and facilitated the marriage and accession of their daughter Ada amid dynastic disputes in 1203.

== Life ==
=== Origins ===
Adelaide was the daughter of Dietrich II, Count of Cleves (died 1172) and Adelaide (Adelheid) of Sulzbach (died 1189). Nothing is known about her childhood and upbringing. She had two brothers: Dietrich III/IV (died before 1202) and Arnold (died 1200), and a sister, Margaret (Margaretha) (died about 1184). Adelaide's father is called a wealthy man in the Egmond Annals. The counts of Cleves were on good terms with the counts of Holland, who, like them, had an interest in limiting the power of the counts of Guelders, although intermarriages regularly took place between all these regions.

The good relationship between Holland and Cleves was sealed with two marriages between the two houses: in 1182, Dietrich III of Cleves married Margaret (Margaretha), daughter of Floris III of Holland, and in 1186 the union between Adelaide and Dirk VII of Holland, then heir to the county, took place. The couple would have three daughters: Aleydis and Petronilla (both died before 1203) and Ada (c. 1188–after 1234). In 1190, Dirk succeeded his father as Count Dirk VII of Holland.

=== Countess of Holland ===
As the wife of Dirk VII, Adelaide played a prominent role in the administration of the county. It is striking that she was the first Dutch countess to consistently act as comitissa ("countess") instead of – as was customary until then – uxor or coniunx ("wife") was designated. She was also the first to bear the title "Countess of Holland". Furthermore, she acted remarkably often as co-counsellor next to her husband. Count and countess are mentioned together in all charters issued by the Dutch chancellery between 1198 and 1203. Whether Adelaide's strong personality played a role in this, or if it was a deliberate policy, is unclear. It is possible that Dirk wanted to prepare his subjects for a possible regency of Adelaide, in case he died young. The regency of a countess dowager for her minor children was not an uncommon phenomenon in Holland, but the minor children had been male in all cases hitherto, while Dirk and Adelaide had only daughters. A regency of Adelaide for her daughter could meet with resistance because it was nowhere stipulated that a woman could succeed in the county of Holland. By putting Adelaide in the foreground, Dirk seems to have wanted to avoid problems in the event of a regency.

=== Regency ===
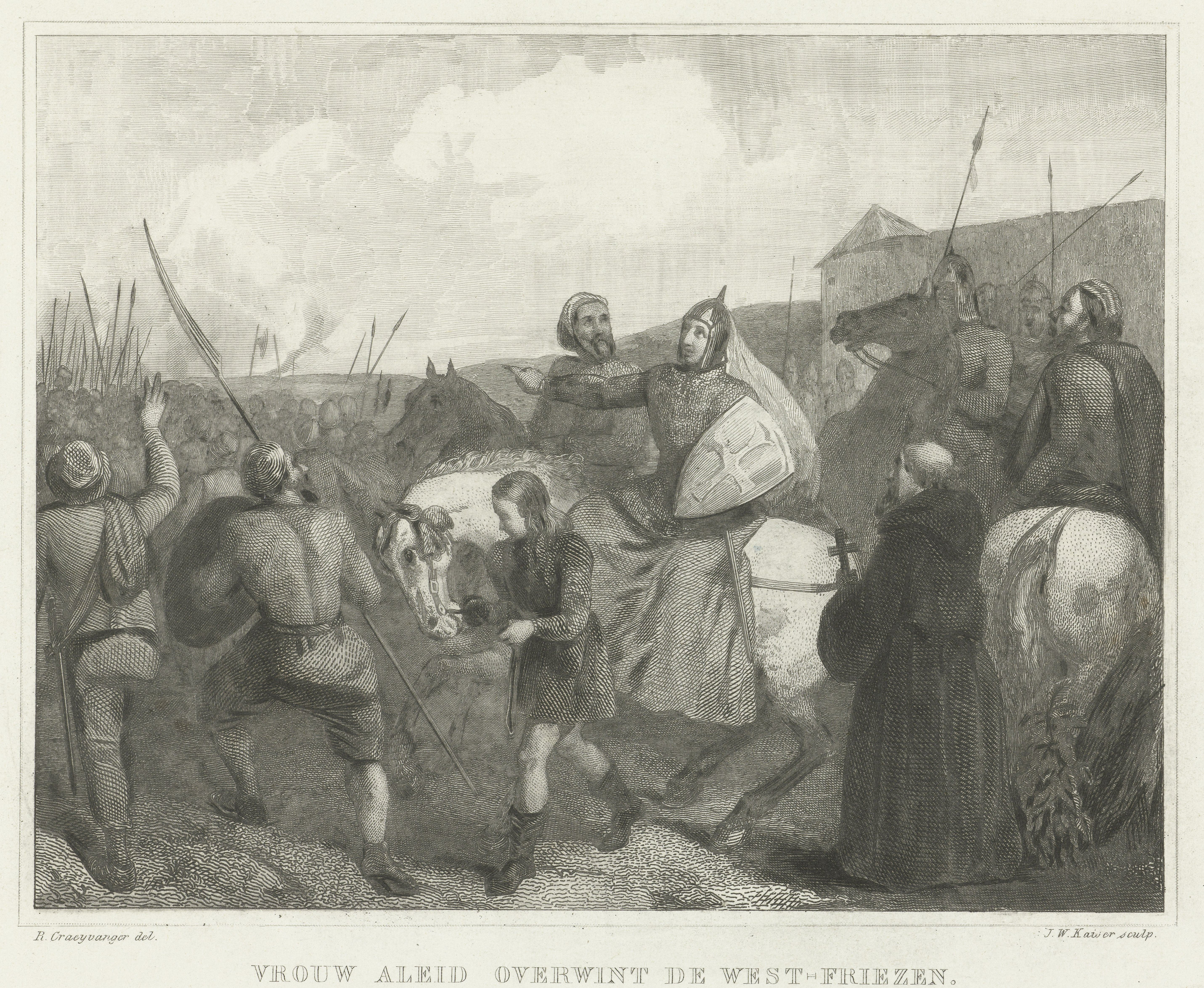
Johann Wilhelm Kaiser, Aleid defeats the West Frisians, 1195 (1839–1841). Aleid on horseback with her army: on the left the foot soldiers, on the right the horsemen

In 1195, Adelaide actually had to take charge. The county was attacked from the north by Dirk's younger brother William (Willem) while Dirk himself was involved in a war against the Flemish count in Zeeland. Adelaide marched with an army to Egmond and took residence in the monastery for two months, to lead the counterattack from there. The monastery's annalist – who was not on Adelaide's side – complains about the commotion this entailed. Every day there was a back and forth of maidservants and other female followers of the Countess. Her arrival was, moreover, "to the great disadvantage of the monastery and to the inconvenience of the whole monastic community, because the Church had to pay her expenses for food as well as for many other things, for the benefit of the knights and the others". But the writer also had to admit that Adelaide prepared the battle against William skilfully and decisively. Her army succeeded in pushing back William's troops.

=== Daughter's reign ===
In 1203, Dirk VII became seriously ill. In an attempt to secure the succession, Adelaide hastily arranged a marriage between her only surviving daughter Ada and Louis II, Count of Loon. She hoped that this would take the wind out of his sails as a possible successor to Dirk's brother William. According to the Egmond annalist, Dirk would have entrusted the care of Ada to William, but Adelaide would have thwarted this. Immediately after Dirk's death, she ensured that the marriage between fifteen-year-old Ada and Louis was solemnized on 4 November, even before Dirk was buried in Egmond. A succession struggle between the followers of Adelaide and those of William ensued. According to the annalist, Adelaide would also play an active role in this: "…everything was handled according to the will, orders and directions of Countess Aleid". However, she could not prevent William from finally gaining the upper hand. Ada was captured after taking refuge in the stronghold of Leiden, and was then sent to William's ally John Lackland in London. In 1210, William definitively took the title "Count of Holland". Adelaide had to accept this reality, but she would call herself "Countess of Holland" for years to come.

=== Later years ===
After this turbulent period, things became quiet around Adelaide. The Egmond Annals do not go further than 1205, and the charter material also contains little information. There is, however, a letter from Adelaide from 1207 to King John of England, in which she begs him to let her daughter Ada, who is being held captive there by order of William, return to Holland. It is not known where Adelaide spent the rest of her relatively long life. In 1237, she donated two Dutch pounds to the Rijnsburg monastery, where she wanted to be buried. Other prominent members of the Count's family lay there, including Adelaide's daughter Aleydis, and her brother-in-law William I with his first wife Adelaide of Guelders. The Count's family apparently held no grudge against Adelaide, because after her death around 1238 (an exact year or date is unknown) she was indeed buried in Rijnsburg. Her surviving daughter Ada had probably been dead for about four years at the time.

== Legacy ==
With contemporary, but also with later historians, Adelaide has had predominantly bad press. The hasty marriage she arranged between the young Ada and Louis of Loon and her active role in the Loon War are mentioned with disapproval. The prevailing opinion is that she acted mainly out of self-interest.
