= Ada of Holland, Margravine of Brandenburg =

Margravine of Brandenburg from 1175 to 1205

Ada
- Margravine consort of Brandenburg
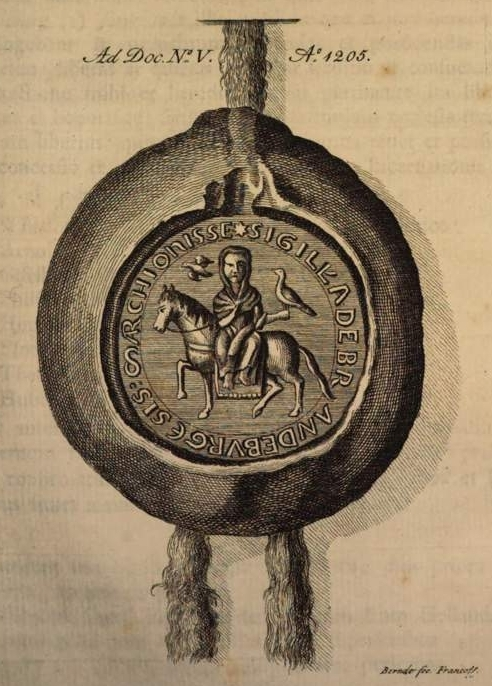
- Falcon hunting seal of Ada of Holland, Margravine of Brandenburg, 1205, copper engraving from Philipp Wilhelm Gercken
- Born: c. 1163
- Died: after 1205
- Noble family: House of Holland
- Spouses: Otto I Otto II
- Issue: Albert II, Margrave of Brandenburg
- Father: Floris III, Count of Holland
- Mother: Ada of Huntingdon

Ada of Holland (c. 1163 – after 1205) was the margravine of Brandenburg from 1175 to 1205.

== Life ==
Ada was the daughter of Count Floris III of Holland and his wife Ada of Huntingdon. She was the sister of Counts Dirk VII and William I of Holland.

Around 1175, while still young, Ada married Otto I of Brandenburg, becoming Margravine of Brandenburg. This was Otto's second marriage. He had been married to Judith of Poland. Otto already had two sons from his marriage to Judith, Otto (who later succeeded his father as Margrave of Brandenburg) in 1149, and Henry (who inherited the Counties of Tangermünde and Gardelegen) in 1150. Ada and Otto had a son named Albert who would succeed his half-brother Otto II as Margrave of Brandenburg in 1205.

In 1184, Otto I founded a nunnery at Arendsee and in the founding charter, Ada appears along with Otto's three sons, giving assent to the foundation. Otto I died in the same year and was succeeded by Otto II, his eldest son by his first marriage. After Otto I's death, she married his son, Otto II, from his first marriage.

In a letter, Pope Innocent III, in his third year of pontificate, admonished Otto to treat his wife with conjugal affection. A knight tried to murder Ada in Schönwalde and was sentenced to death by Otto II.

In 1205, Otto II died and Ada's son Albert succeeded his half-brother Otto II as Margrave of Brandenburg. After this, she seems to have returned to Holland, since she appears in a charter of 1205, making a donation to the abbey of Rijnsburg, with the consent of her mother, Ada of Huntingdon, her brothers William I and Florence, Bishop of Glasgow, and her niece Ada, Countess of Holland. After 1205, there are no further references to Ada in chronicles and she does not appear in any further documents. Her date of death is not recorded.
