= Countess of Holland =

The Countess of Holland was the title held by the spouse of the Count of Holland, a feudal title in the County of Holland in what is now the Netherlands. The county existed from the ninth century until 1581, when the United Provinces declared independence from Spanish rule. Following that point, the kings of Spain continued to use the title in a titular capacity until the Treaty of Münster in 1648. The following lists record the women who held the title, organized by the ruling house of their respective spouses.

== Countess of Holland ==
=== House of Holland, 875–1299 ===
Picture	Name	Father	Birth	Marriage	Became Countess	Ceased to be Countess	Death	Spouse
	Geva	-	-	-	-	-	11 January ?	Dirk I
	Hildegard	probably Arnulf I, Count of Flanders (Flanders)	before 933	945/50		6 May 988 husband's death	10 April 990	Dirk II
	Lutgardis of Luxemburg	Siegfried of Luxembourg (Luxembourg)	955	after 980	6 May 988 husband's accession	18 September 993 husband's death	14 May, after 1005	Arnulf
	Othelhilde	probably Bernard I, Duke of Saxony (Billung)	-	-	18 September 993 husband's accession	27 May 1039 husband's death	9 March 1043/44	Dirk III
	Gertrude of Saxony	Bernard II, Duke of Saxony (Billung)	1030	1050		28 June 1061 husband's death	4 August 1113	Floris I
	Othelhilde	-	-	before 26 July 1083		17 June 1091 husband's death	18 November ?	Dirk V
	Gertrude-Petronilla of Lorraine	Theodoric II, Duke of Lorraine (Metz)	1082	1113		2 March 1121 husband's death	23 May 1144	Floris II
	Sophie of Salm	Otto of Salm, Count of Rheineck and Bentheim (Salm)	1115	before 1137		5 August 1157 husband's death	20/26 September 1176	Dirk VI
	Ada of Huntingdon	Henry of Scotland, 3rd Earl of Huntingdon (Dunkeld)	1146/48	1162, before 28 August		1 August 1190 husband's death	11 January, after 1205	Floris III
	Adelaide of Cleves	Dietrich II, Count of Cleves (Cleves)	-	1186	1 August 1190 husband's accession	4 November 1203 husband's death	-	Dirk VII
	Adelaide of Guelders	Otto I, Count of Guelders (Wassenberg)	1187	1197	4 November 1203 husband's accession	4 February 1218		William I
	Marie of Brabant	Henry I, Duke of Brabant (Leuven)	1190	July 1220		14 February 1222 husband's death	9 March/14 June 1260	William I
	Matilda of Brabant	Henry I, Duke of Brabant (Leuven)	1200	6 December 1224		19 July 1234 husband's death	22 December 1267	Floris IV
	Elisabeth of Brunswick-Lüneburg	Otto I, Duke of Brunswick-Lüneburg (Welf)	1230	25 January 1252		28 January 1256 husband's death	27 May 1266	William II
	Beatrice of Flanders	Guy, Count of Flanders (Dampierre)	1260	1270		23 March 1296		Floris V
	Elizabeth of Rhuddlan	Edward I of England (Plantagenet)	7 August 1282	18 January 1297		10 November 1299 husband's death	5 May 1316	John I

=== House of Avesnes, 1299–1354 ===
Picture	Name	Father	Birth	Marriage	Became Countess	Ceased to be Countess	Death	Spouse
	Philippa of Luxembourg	Henry V, Count of Luxembourg (Luxembourg)	1252	1265	10 November 1299 husband's accession	22 August 1304 husband's death	6 April 1311	John II
	Joan of Valois	Charles, Count of Valois (Valois)	1294	19 May 1305		7 June 1337 husband's death	7 March 1342	William III
	Joanna, Duchess of Brabant	John III, Duke of Brabant (Leuven)	24 June 1322	before 27 November 1334	7 June 1337 husband's accession	26 September 1345 husband's death	1 November 1406	William IV

=== House of Wittelsbach, 1354–1432 ===
Picture	Name	Father	Birth	Marriage	Became Countess	Ceased to be Countess	Death	Spouse
	Maud, Countess of Leicester	Henry of Grosmont, 1st Duke of Lancaster (Plantagenet)	4 April 1339	1352	7 December 1354 husband's accession	10 April 1362		William V
	Margaret of Brieg	Ludwik I, Duke of Legnica-Brzeg (Piast)	1342/43	after 19 July 1353		26 February 1386		Albert I
	Margaret of Cleves	Adolph I, Count of Cleves (De la Marck)	1375	2 April 1394		13 December 1404 husband's death	14 May 1411	Albert I
	Margaret of Burgundy	Philip II, Duke of Burgundy (Valois-Burgundy)	October 1374	12 April 1385	13 December 1404 husband's accession	31 May 1417 husband's death	8 March 1441	William VI

=== House of Valois-Burgundy, 1432–1482 ===
Picture	Name	Father	Birth	Marriage	Became Countess	Ceased to be Countess	Death	Spouse
	Isabella of Portugal	John I of Portugal (Aviz)	21 February 1397	7 January 1430	8 October 1436 husband's accession	15 July 1467 husband's death	17 December 1471	Philip I
	Margaret of York	Richard Plantagenet, 3rd Duke of York (York)	3 May 1446	9 July 1468		5 January 1477 husband's death	23 November 1503	Charles I

=== House of Habsburg, 1482–1581 ===
Picture	Name	Father	Birth	Marriage	Became Countess	Ceased to be Countess	Death	Spouse
	Joanna of Castile	Ferdinand II of Aragon (Trastámara)	6 November 1479	20 October 1496		25 September 1506 husband's death	12 April 1555	Philip II
	Isabella of Portugal	Manuel I of Portugal (Aviz)	24 October 1503	11 March 1526		1 May 1539		Charles II
	Mary I of England	Henry VIII of England (Tudor)	18 February 1516	25 July 1554	16 January 1556 husband's ascension	17 November 1558		Philip III
	Elisabeth of Valois	Henry II of France (Valois)	2 April 1545	22 June 1559		3 October 1568		Philip III
	Anna of Austria	Maximilian II, Holy Roman Emperor (Habsburg)	1 November 1549	May 1570		26 October 1580		Philip III

== Titular Countess of Holland ==
=== House of Habsburg, 1581–1648 ===
Picture	Name	Father	Birth	Marriage	Became Countess	Ceased to be Countess	Death	Spouse
	Margaret of Austria	Charles II of Austria (Habsburg)	25 December 1584	18 April 1599		3 October 1611		Philip III of Spain
	Elisabeth of Bourbon	Henry IV of France (Bourbon)	22 November 1602	25 November 1615	31 March 1621 husband's accession	6 October 1644		Philip V

During the 'foreign rule' by Burgundy and Habsburg, the county was governed by a stadtholder in name of the count. In 1581, the Estates General of the United Provinces declared themselves independent from the Spanish rule of Philip II (who was Philip III of Holland). Until the Treaty of Münster in 1648, the kings of Spain still used the title Count of Holland, but they had lost the actual power over the county to the States of Holland.

== See also ==
- Countess of Hainault
- Countess of Zeeland
- List of Bavarian consorts
- List of Dutch consorts
