= Otto II the Generous =

Otto II the Generous may refer to:

- Otto II, Margrave of Brandenburg (after 1147–1205)
- Otto II, Duke of Brunswick-Lüneburg (about 1266–1330)
