= County of Moha =

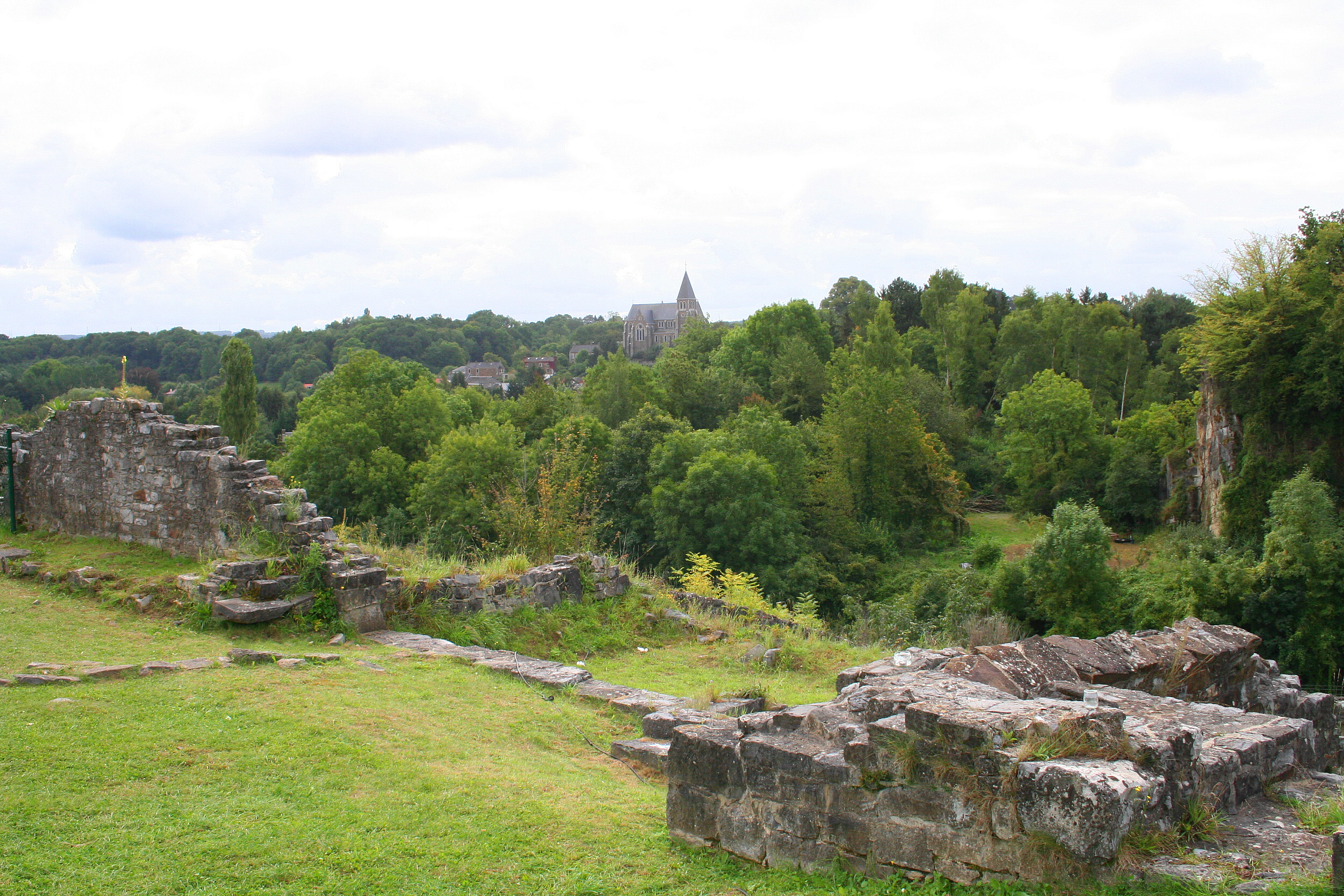
Ruins of the castle of Moha today

During the Middle Ages, the County of Moha (Latin: comitatus Muhae or Mohae) was a small territory in the pagus of Hesbaye. The area was located in the Duchy of Lower Lorraine, within the Holy Roman Empire (in what is now eastern Belgium). It was centred around the village of Moha on the right bank of the river Mehaigne and its nearby castle.

The "county" of Moha was originally an allod. It came to be regarded as a county only during the 11th century, when its lords became counts of Eguisheim, and later counts of Dagsburg and Metz. Among its dependencies were the manors of Antheit, Saint-Jean, Waleffe and Wanze.

== Alberts I and II ==
The first recorded lord (not count) of Moha was Albert I, known from a charter of the bishopric of Liège dated 1031 and from another of Archbishop Poppo of Trier dated to 1040–44. This Albert may have belonged to the House of Verdun, since he signed immediately after Count Albert II of Namur in 1031 and Duke Godfrey the Bearded in the 1040s. Furthermore, Archbishop Poppo's charter was issued on behalf of Count Gozelo I of Montaigu and his wife.

Albert I was succeeded by Albert II, but how or even whether they are related is unknown. Albert II married Hedwig (Heilwig), a daughter of Count Henry I of Dagsburg and Egisheim, himself a son of Count Henry VI and nephew of Pope Leo IX. According to a letter of Pope Leo, his nephew Henry was dead by 1050. He was succeeded in Dagsburg by his son Hugh VII and in Egisheim by his daughter, who thus passed the county to Albert II. (Note: There seems to have been another line of counts of Egisheim descended from Henry VI's brother Gerard I, indicating perhaps that the county was partitioned.) He became, by a combination of his new title (count) with his old allodial lordship (Moha), the first count of Moha. The Codex Hirsaugiensis explicitly refers to Albert as count of Egisheim. (Note: Latin: Adalbertus comes de Egensheim et uxor ejus Heilewig.) In his own donation to Marbach Abbey, he refers to himself as "the count of Egisheim, called of Moha". (Note: Latin: Albertus comes de Egisheim dictus de Musal.) Finally, in a document from Sint-Truiden Abbey he is called simply the count of Moha. (Note: Latin: Albertus comes de Musal.)

In 1089, Hugh VII died and Albert II inherited Dagsburg. After the death of Hedwige, he married Ermesindis, daughter of Count Conrad I of Luxembourg. Hugh VIII, his son by Hedwig, succeeded to the county of Dagsburg around 1098, while Egisheim passed to another branch of the family. Thereafter, Moha remained in the hands of the counts of Dagsburg until the death of the last of the line in 1212.

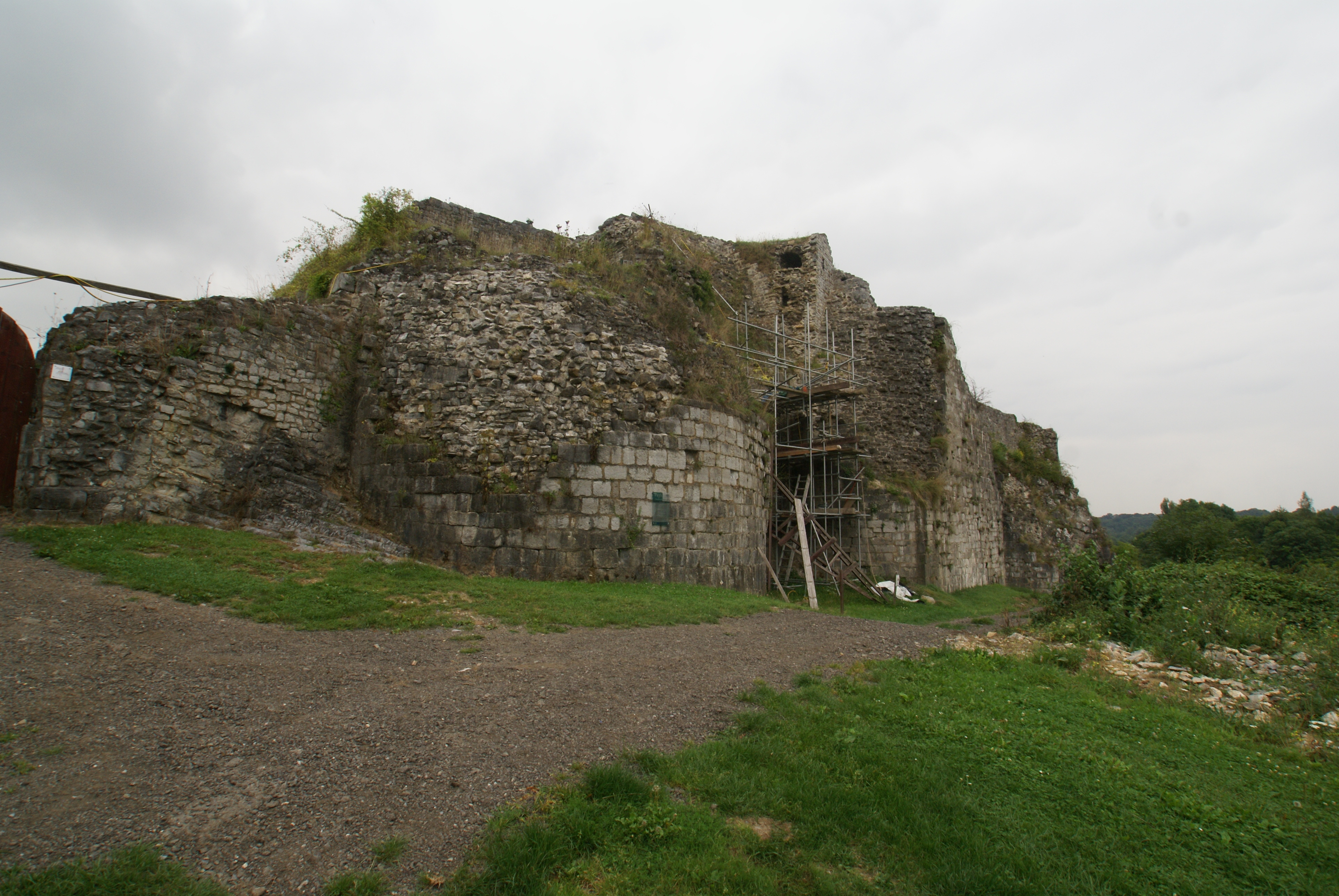
Ruins of the castle of Moha today

== War of succession ==
In 1201, Count Albert II of Dagsburg (Albert III of Moha) made Duke Henry I of Brabant his heir for the castle of Dagbsurg and the county of Metz if he should die without an heir of the body. Moha was included in this grant. In 1204, Albert altered the terms of his will, leaving the same possessions to the bishopric of Liège. In these two wills the legal status of the territory is not confused by the traditional title of "county". It is described as the allodium de Muha [or Musal] et de Waleve.

On Albert's death in 1212, the county of Moha was disputed between Liège and Brabant. Duke Henry, assisted by Waleran, heir of the Duchy of Limburg, marched an army as if to attack Moha, while Bishop Hugues de Pierrepont moved with his army to Huy. Bypassing Moha, the duke attacked undefended Liège while the bishop force-marched his army back from Huy. Liège was occupied on 3 May and looted for four days. On 8 May, Henry began the siege of Moha, but failing to take it quickly, abandoned it on 10 May.

The bishop immediately set to work strengthening and rebuilding Liège. In July, strengthened by alliances with Marquis Philip I of Namur, Count Louis II of Looz and Count Ferdinand of Flanders, he moved against Brabant. Threatened by a superior force, Henry opened negotiations. In the end, he relinquished his claim on Moha.

The settlement did not last. In October 1213, Bishop Hugues and Ferdinand invaded Brabant from two sides, claiming that Henry was not fulfilling his obligations under the prior treaty. When Ferdinand was forced to divert his attention to his French border, the bishop called on the count of Looz. Henry marched an army through the county of Moha and the two sides met in the Battle of Steppes on 13 October 1213. The Liègeois were victorious. The county of Moha was confirmed to the bishop.

== List of lords and counts ==
- Albert I (or Adalbert I), fl. 1031 – c. 1042
- Albert II (or Adalbert II), before 1050 – 1097/8
- For subsequent counts, see County of Dagsburg
