= Elisabeth of Brandenburg =

Elisabeth of Brandenburg may refer to:

- Elisabeth of Brandenburg, Landgravine of Thuringia (1206–1231), wife of Henry Raspe, Landgrave of Thuringia
- Elisabeth of Brandenburg, Duchess of Brzeg-Legnica and Cieszyn (1403–1449), wife firstly of Louis II of Brieg and later Wenceslaus I, Duke of Cieszyn
- Elisabeth of Brandenburg, Duchess of Pomerania (1425–1465), wife firstly of Joachim, Duke of Pomerania and later Wartislaw X, Duke of Pomerania
- Elisabeth of Brandenburg, Duchess of Württemberg (1451–1524), wife of Eberhard II, Duke of Württemberg
- Elisabeth of Brandenburg, Countess of Henneberg-Aschach (1474–1507), daughter of Albrecht III Achilles, Elector of Brandenburg and his second wife Anna of Saxony, Electress of Brandenburg; wife of Hermann VIII, Count of Henneberg-Aschach
- Elisabeth of Brandenburg-Ansbach-Kulmbach (1494–1518), wife of Ernest, Margrave of Baden-Durlach
- Elisabeth of Brandenburg, Duchess of Brunswick-Calenberg-Göttingen (1510–1558), wife of Eric I, Duke of Brunswick-Calenberg-Göttingen
- Elisabeth of Brandenburg-Küstrin (1540–1578), wife of George Frederick, Margrave of Brandenburg-Ansbach
- Margravine Elisabeth Sophie of Brandenburg (1589–1629), wife firstly of Prince Janusz Radziwiłł and later Julius Henry, Duke of Saxe-Lauenburg
- Margravine Elisabeth Sophie of Brandenburg (1674–1748), wife firstly of Frederick Casimir Kettler, Duke of Courland, secondly Christian Ernst, Margrave of Brandenburg-Bayreuth and lastly Ernst Ludwig I, Duke of Saxe-Meiningen
