= Judith of Poland =

12th-century Margravine consort of Brandenburg

- Margravine consort of Brandenburg
- Born: c. 1130/35
- Died: 8 July 1171/75
- Spouse: Otto I, Margrave of Brandenburg
- Issue: Otto II; Henry, Count of Tangermünde and Gardelegen
- House: Piast
- Father: Bolesław III Wrymouth
- Mother: Salomea of Berg

Judith of Poland (Polish: Judyta Bolesławówna, Hungarian: Judit; b. c. 1130/35 – died 8 July 1171/75) was a member of the House of Piast and by marriage margravine of Brandenburg.

== Early years ==
Judith was the daughter of Duke Bolesław III Wrymouth of Poland by his second wife, Salomea of Berg. She was probably named after either her paternal grandmother, Judith of Bohemia, or her older half-sister, the princess of Murom. Judith was one of the youngest children of her parents; her date of birth remains unknown. According to Polish medieval chronicles, she was sent to Hungary as a bride of the son of King Béla II. According to the Annales Cracovienses Compilati, this event took place in 1136; since it can be assumed that the Polish princess was younger than her betrothed, and also are known the birth dates of the youngest children of Bolesław III (Agnes in 1137 and Casimir in 1138), Judith in consequence could have been born between 1130 and 1135.

The marriage never took place: by 1146, the engagement was broken with the consent of both parties and Judith returned to Poland. The reason for this may have been the wedding of Mieszko (Judith's brother) with the Hungarian princess Elisabeth (daughter of King Béla II), which sufficiently secured the Polish-Hungarian alliance.

== Margravine of Brandenburg ==
In Kruszwica on 6 January 1148 Judith married Otto, eldest son of Albert the Bear, the first Margrave of Brandenburg. This union was contracted in connection with the Ascanian efforts to support the Junior Dukes in opposition to King Conrad III of Germany, who supported the deposed High Duke Władysław II as legal ruler of Poland. During her marriage, she bore her husband two sons, Otto (who later succeeded his father as Margrave of Brandenburg) in 1149, and Henry (who inherited the Counties of Tangermünde and Gardelegen) in 1150.

Nothing is known about the political role that Judith had to play in Germany. After his father's death in 1170, Otto became the second Margrave of Brandenburg and Judith the Margravine consort.

== Death and aftermath ==
Like her birth date, Judith's date of death remains unknown. Only the day, 8 July, is known thanks to the Regesta Historia Brandenburgensis, which records the death in "VIII Id Jul" of "Juditha marchionissa gemma Polonorum". By contrast, the year of death can be determined only through indirect sources. In documents from 1170 Judith is named as a living person. It is assumed that Judith died between 1171 and 1175. She was buried in the Brandenburg Cathedral.

Judith's oldest son, Otto II, inherited the Margraviate of Brandenburg after the death of his father in 1184. He never married or had children; because his brother Henry died before him (in 1192) also without issue, after Otto II's death in 1205 Brandenburg was inherited by his younger half-brother Albert II, son of Otto I and Ada.
