= Loon War =

13th century war

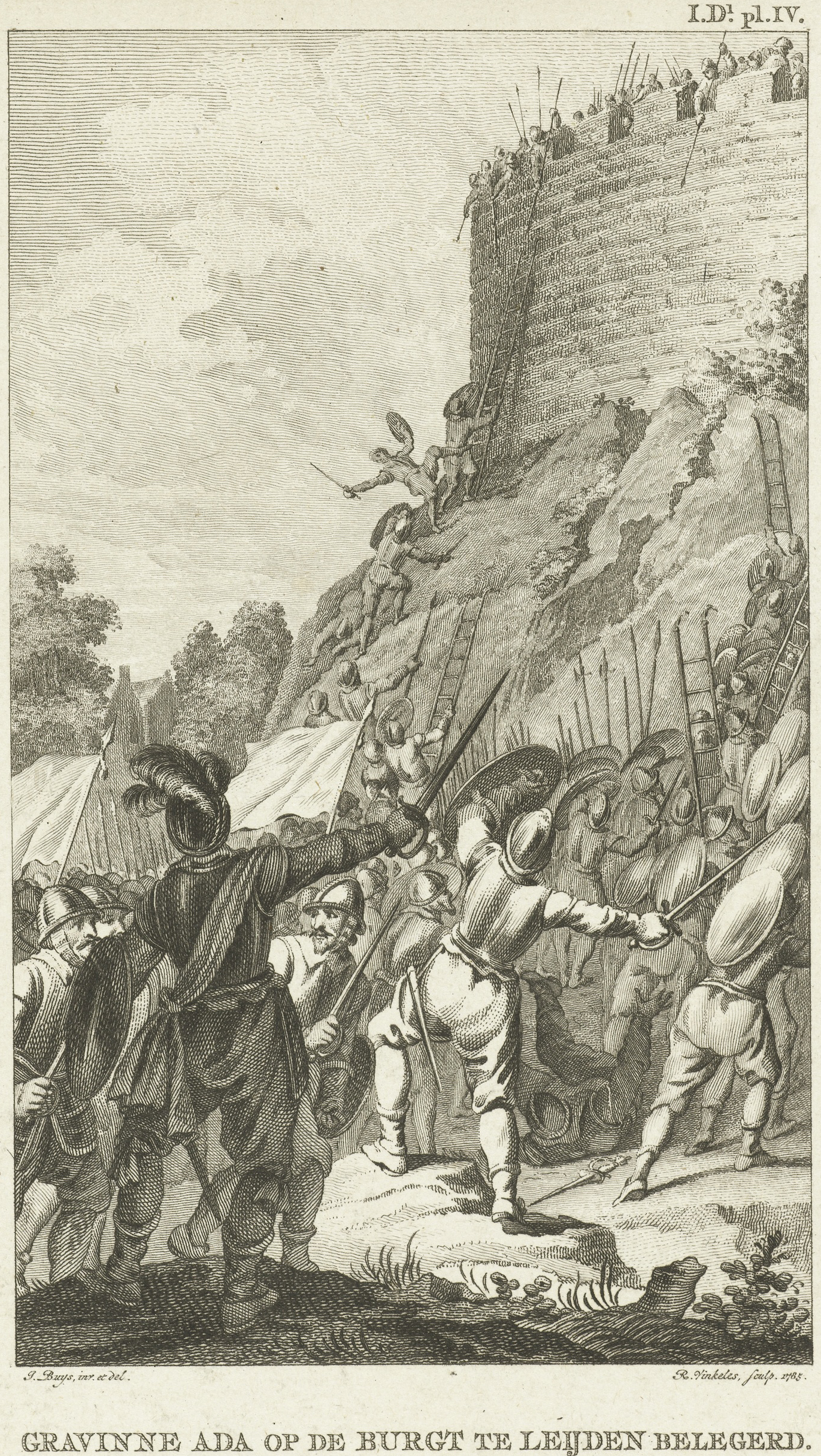
- William's troops besiege Ada in the Fortress of Leiden. Reinier Vinkeles (1785).
Date	1203 – 1206
Location	Holland and Zeeland
Result	Military victory for William; Treaty of Bruges (diplomatic victory for Louis); Long-term political victory for William
Territorial changes	Counties of Holland and Zeeland temporarily divided between William and Louis

Belligerents
Loon; Supported by: France; Staufen; Flanders; Limburg; Brabant; Utrecht; Liège	Holland; Supported by: England; House of Welf

Commanders and leaders
Louis II of Loon; Ada of Holland; Dirk van Are; Philip of Swabia	William of Frisia; Walter of Egmont; John Lackland; Otto IV

The Loon War (Dutch: Loonse Oorlog) was a war of succession over the County of Holland (and its dependency Zeeland) from 1203 until 1206, brought on by the death of count Dirk VII. The war was waged between Dirk's brother William of Frisia, and Dirk's daughter Ada who had quickly married count Louis II of Loon.

== Course ==
=== Succession crisis ===
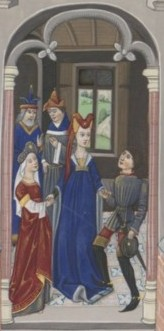
Wedding of Ada and Louis in 1203. 15th-century painting

Count Dirk VII of Holland died on 4 November 1203, having fathered only daughters, with only Ada surviving him. On his deathbed, he declared that he wanted to discuss his succession with his brother, William of Frisia. However, his wife, countess Adelaide of Cleves, who had already fought a battle near Alkmaar against the rebellious William in 1195, wanted Ada to receive the inheritance instead. Because Holland and Zeeland were so-called "sword fiefs" and not "spindle fiefs", Ada, as a woman, had no right to inherit the counties, but Adelaide tried to accomplish this anyway by quickly finding a husband for Ada. Even before her father was buried, the 15-year-old Ada wed count Louis II of Loon, as arranged by her mother. On the way to her father's funeral, she ran into her uncle William's henchmen, after which she entrenched herself in the Fortress of Leiden.

=== War ===
The war of succession took on an international scope: Ada and Louis allied themselves with France and the German house of Hohenstaufen, William joined up with England and the German house of Welf. In the background, a struggle for the throne of the Holy Roman Empire was taking place between the Welf Otto IV of Brunswick and the Stauf Philip of Swabia. This meant that the emperor or overlord was unable to determine the fate of the events in his Dutch provinces. Well-known noblemen from Holland who joined forces with the Loon camp were Gisbert II of Amstel, Floris Herbaren van der Lede, Folpert II van der Lede, Hugo of Voorne, Rogier van der Meere and Otto of Voorn; William was supported by Walter of Egmont, Albert II Banjaert, Philip of Wassenaar, James of Leiden, Simon of Haarlem, William of Teylingen, Jan of Rijswijk and Otto of Bentheim, the son of Dirk VI.

Early on in the conflict, Wiliam's troops besieged the Fortress of Leiden, conquered it, took Ada prisoner and sent her via Texel to England. Diplomatically, Louis' position was stronger, with numerous foreign allies, but in Holland he was seen as a stranger, and the native William was more popular amongst the nobility and citizenry. Louis initially also rallied the support of the Count of Flanders, the prince-bishops of Liège and Utrecht, the dukes of Limburg and later Brabant as well. In 1204, he invaded Holland with a massive army, and managed to expel William to Zeeland.

In the winter of 1203–04, the Kennemers (North Hollanders) used the war tactic of opening up the dykes of the rivers Amstel and IJ and flooding the area between Muiden and Breukelen.

From 1205 onwards, the tide of battle shifted in William's favour. He was now supported by the inhabitants of Zeeland, Kennemerland (coastal North Holland) and Rhineland (South Holland), and his army was stronger. Louis retreated from Holland in early 1206, but was chased by William and defeated in a battle on the banks of the river Zijl.

== Aftermath ==
Louis opted for negotiations, and requested the duke of Brabant to mediate. On 14 October 1206, peace was signed with the Treaty of Bruges. Formally, Holland was partitioned between Louis and William: William received Zeeland and the region around the city of Geertruidenberg, Louis would keep the rest Holland. However, several sources show that William soon became the de facto ruler of Holland; for example, William called himself simply comes Hollandiae ("count of Holland") in a 1210 deed. Halfway into 1207, Louis managed to liberate his wife Ada after corresponding with the English king, John Lackland, but he had to send his brother Arnold as a replacement hostage to England.

== Literature ==
- DR. H.P.H Jansen, Middeleeuwse geschiedenis der Nederlanden, Prisma-Compendia, 6th edition (1979), p. 115/6.
