= Floris III =

Count of Holland from 1157 to 1190

Count of Holland
- Reign: 1157–1190
- Predecessor: Dirk VI
- Successor: Dirk VII
- Born: c. 1141
- Died: 1 August 1190
- Spouse: Ada
- Issue Detail: Ada, Margravine of Brandenburg; Dirk VII, Count of Holland; William I, Count of Holland; Florence, Bishop of Glasgow
- House: Holland
- Father: Dirk VI, Count of Holland
- Mother: Sophia of Rheineck

Floris III (c. 1141 – 1 August 1190) was the count of Holland from 1157 to 1190. He was a son of Dirk VI and Sophia of Rheineck, heiress of Bentheim.

== Career ==
Floris III was a loyal vassal to Emperor Frederick Barbarossa. He accompanied the emperor on two expeditions to Italy in 1158 and 1176–1178. Frederick thanked him by making Floris part of the imperial nobility. The emperor gave Floris the toll right of Geervliet, the most important toll station in Holland at that time. This was actually the legalisation of an existing situation, because the counts of Holland had charged tolls illegally since the start of the 11th century.

Many farmers came to Holland to turn the swamps into agricultural lands. Dikes and dams were built, and the border between Holland and the bishopric of Utrecht had to be determined. There was a dispute between Floris and the bishop of Utrecht about a new dam in the Rhine at Zwammerdam in 1165, which had to be settled by Emperor Frederick. The brother of Floris, Baldwin, became bishop of Utrecht in 1178.

War broke out between Flanders and Holland. Count Philip I of Flanders wanted to have Zeeland back. Floris was captured in Bruges and had to accept Flemish overlordship in Zeeland as ransom in 1167. During his reign, Floris III had troubles with West Friesland and a war with Philip concerning their respective rights in West Zeeland, in which he was beaten. In 1170, a great flood caused immense devastation in the north and helped to form the Zuider Zee.

Floris accompanied Frederick Barbarossa on the Third Crusade in 1189, taking with him his son William. He died in 1190 at Antioch of pestilence and was buried there. He was succeeded by his son Dirk VII.

== Family and children ==
In 1162, Floris married Ada, sister of King William the Lion of Scotland. The county of Holland adopted from him the rampant lion in the coat of arms and the name of William. Their children were:

1. Ada (died after 1205), married 1176 Margrave Otto I of Brandenburg and later his son Otto II of Brandenburg
2. Margaret (died after 1203), married 1182 Count Dietrich IV of Cleves
3. Dirk VII of Holland
4. William I of Holland
5. Floris (died 1210), bishop of Glasgow
6. Otto, priest at Oudmunster
7. Baldwin (died 1204)
8. Robert
9. Beatrix
10. Elisabeth
11. Hedwig
12. Agnes (died 1228), abbess at Rijnsburg Abbey

== Sources ==
- Gumbert-Hepp, M.; Gumbert, J.P.; Burgers, J. W. J., eds. (2007). Annalen van Egmond: de Annales Egmundenses tezamen met de Annales Xantenses en het Egmondse Leven van Thomas Becket. Uitgeverij Verloren. ISBN 9087040008.
- Murray, Alan V., ed. (2006). The Crusades: An Encyclopedia. Bloomsbury Publishing. ISBN 9781576078631.

| Preceded by Dirk VI | Count of Holland; 1157–1190 | Succeeded by Dirk VII |
