= Elisabeth of Brunswick-Lüneburg =

Queen of Germany from 1252 to 1256

- Countess of Holland and Zeeland
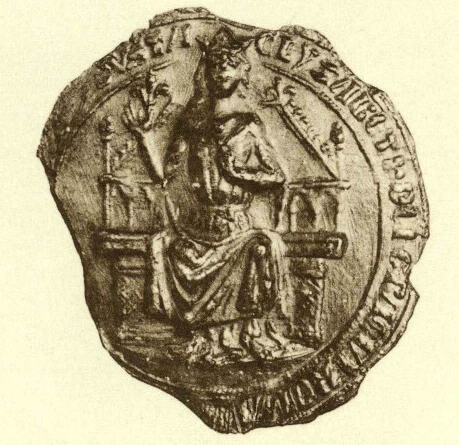

Queen consort of the Romans
- Tenure: 25 January 1252 – 28 January 1256
- Born: 1230
- Died: 27 May 1266 (aged 35–36)
- Spouse: William II of Holland
- Issue: Floris V, Count of Holland; Machteld of Holland
- House: Welf
- Father: Otto I, Duke of Brunswick-Lüneburg
- Mother: Matilda of Brandenburg

Elisabeth of Brunswick-Lüneburg (1230 – 27 May 1266) was Queen of the Romans, Countess of Holland, and Countess of Zeeland as the wife of William II of Holland.

== Biography ==
Elisabeth of Brunswick-Lüneburg was born in 1230 to Otto I, Duke of Brunswick-Lüneburg and Matilda of Brandenburg.

On 25 January 1252 she married William II of Holland, who was elected anti-king of the Germans in 1247 and crowned King of the Romans in 1248, in Brunswick. As the consort of William II, she was the Countess of Holland, Countess of Zeeland, and Queen of the Romans. They had two children, Floris and Machteld. Her husband died in 1256.

She died on 27 May 1266 and was buried in the Middelburg Abbey church.
