= Ada of Scotland =

12th-century Scottish noblewoman

Ada of Huntingdon
- Died: after 1206
- Buried: Abbey of Middelburg
- Noble family: House of Dunkeld
- Spouse: Floris III, Count of Holland
- Issue: Ada of Holland, Margravine of Brandenburg; Margaret; Dirk VII, Count of Holland; William I, Count of Holland; Florence of Holland; Baldwin; Robert; Beatrix; Elisabeth; Hedwig; Agnes
- Father: Henry of Huntingdon
- Mother: Ada de Warenne

Ada of Scotland (died after 1206), also known as Ada of Huntingdon, was a member of the Scottish royal house who became Countess of Holland by marriage to Floris III, Count of Holland.

== Life ==
Ada was born in Scotland, the daughter of Henry of Huntingdon and Ada de Warenne. Henry was the son of King David I of Scotland and Maud, Countess of Huntingdon, and Ada's siblings include the Scottish kings Malcolm IV, William the Lion, and David of Scotland, Earl of Huntingdon.

=== Countess of Holland ===
In 1162 she was asked for her hand in marriage to Floris III, Count of Holland by the Abbot of Egmond, Holland. Together, the Abbot and Ada traveled back to Holland, where the wedding ceremony occurred, probably in Egmond, on 28 August 1162. Ada received the County of Ross in the Scottish Highlands as a wedding gift.

Ada was not actively involved in the governance of the County of Holland but was occasionally mentioned in documents. Floris, her husband was a loyal ally of the Holy Roman Emperor, Frederick I, and often went with him into battle. Dutch chronicler Melis Stoke states that she supported her son in the war with William of Cleves during the War of Succession. In addition, Ada is known to have read Latin. Ada died after 1206 and was probably buried in the Abbey of Middelburg, to which she had already made donations of £64.

== Issue ==
Ada and Floris had about 11 children, some of whom died young.

1. Ada (died after 1205), married 1176 Margrave Otto I of Brandenburg
2. Margaret (died after 1203), married 1182 Count Dietrich IV of Cleves
3. Dirk VII, Count of Holland
4. William I, Count of Holland
5. Floris (died 1210), bishop of Glasgow
6. Baldwin (died 1204)
7. Robert
8. Beatrix
9. Elisabeth
10. Hedwig
11. Agnes (died 1228), Abbess at Rijnsburg

== Sources ==
- Gumbert-Hepp, M.; Gumbert, J. P.; Burgers, J. W. J., eds. (2007). Annalen van Egmond (in Dutch). Hilversum Verloren.
- Pollock, M. A. (2015). Scotland, England and France After the Loss of Normandy, 1204-1296: "Auld Amitie". The Boydell Press.
- Tuck, Anthony (1999). Crown and Nobility: England 1272-1461 (2nd ed.). Blackwell Publishers.
