= Battle of Steppes =

Battle in 1213 in modern-day Belgium

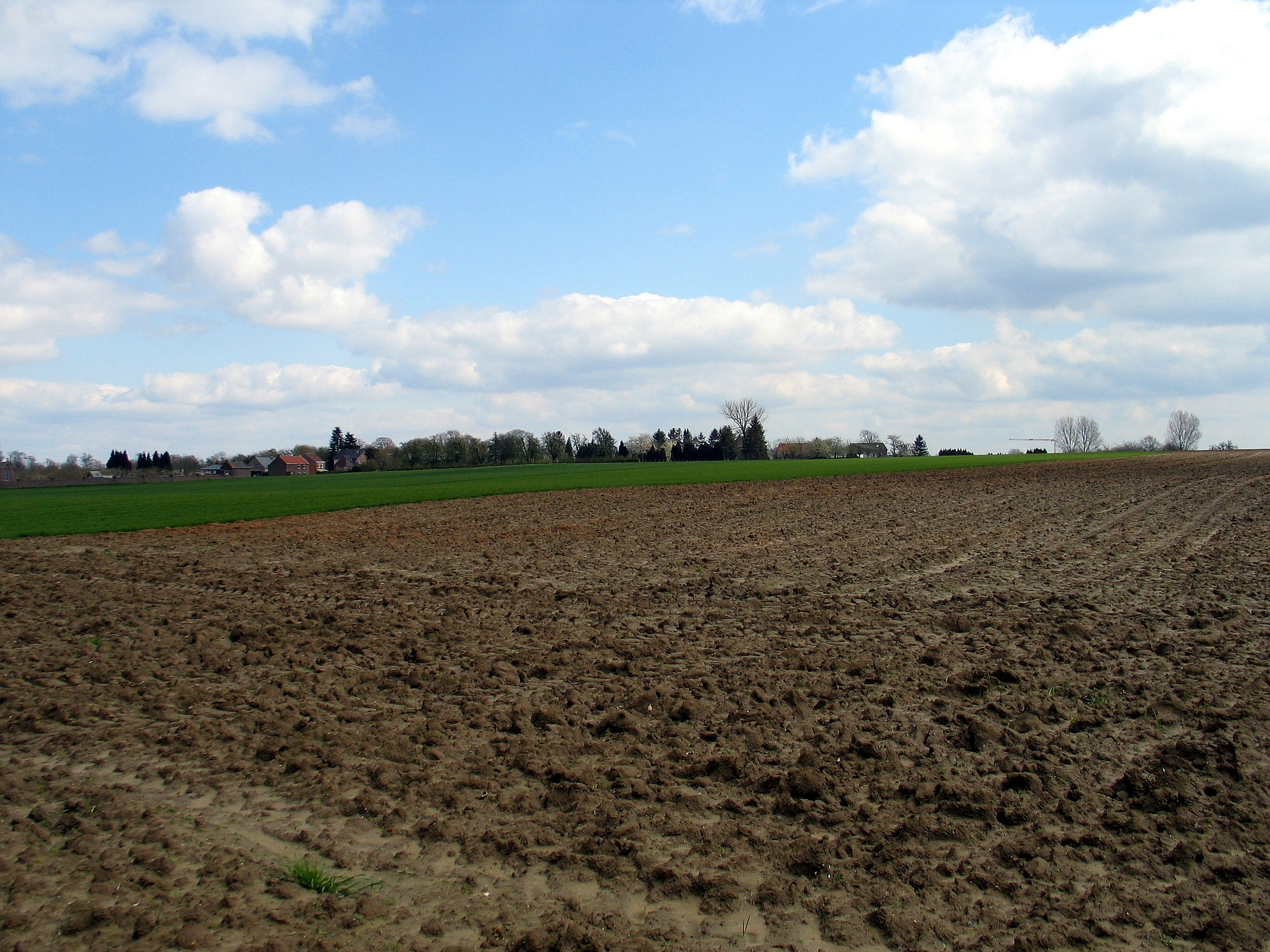
- The Steppes plain near Montenaken, 2008
| Date | 13 October 1213 |
| Location | Montenaken, Belgium 50°42′46″N 5°07′32″E |
| Result | Brabantine defeat |

Belligerents
| Bishopric of Liège; County of Loon | Duchy of Brabant |

Commanders and leaders
| Bishop Hugh Pierrepont; Henry III, Duke of Limburg; Louis II, Count of Loon | Henry I, Duke of Brabant |

Strength
| Unknown | 3,300–4,400 |

Casualties and losses
| 200 | 2,500–3,000 killed |
- Location within Belgium

The Battle of Steppes was fought in modern-day Belgium on 13 October 1213 between Hugh Pierrepont, Bishop of Liège, and Henry I, Duke of Brabant.

== Cause ==
In 1212, Albert II, Count of Dagsburg, the last ruler of the County of Moha, died without a son. Both Henry I, Duke of Brabant and Louis II, Count of Loon were related to Albert and claimed the county. Henry was also allied with the King of France, who threatened to invade Flanders, the traditional ally of the Bishopric of Liège. This gave Henry the chance to invade the Bishopric, and to besiege Liège. Badly prepared, the Duke of Brabant retreated, plundering and looting the Bishopric and setting fire to Tongeren.

Bishop Hugh Pierrepont rallied his allies, Louis II, Count of Loon, Henry III, Duke of Limburg and the citizens of Huy, to pursue the Brabantines.

== Battle ==
The two parties agreed to deliver battle in the plain of Steppes (Steps). Henry aligned his army, in three battalions, on the higher ground with the sun on their backs. He also gave his armour to one of his knights, Henry of Huldenberg, to avoid being targeted during the battle. Hugh placed the Louis on the right flank with the Duke of Limburg in the center, while Hugh occupied the left flank.

Louis attacked first, drawing the Brabantine re-enforcements to the right wing. Then the rest of the Liège army attacked the weakened left and center. Overwhelmed by the all out charge, the Brabantine army broke and ran. Henry of Huldenberg, the knight in the armour of Duke Henry, was killed.

The Liège militia army, eager on revenge for the destruction in their lands, butchered the Brabantine infantry. They pursued the fleeing army for several kilometers, killing everyone they could. The wounded were savagely mutilated and no quarter was given.

== Consequences ==
The battle of Steppes is one of the first battles where a professional army was beaten by a civilian army. Moha was annexed to Liège.

The battle gave birth to the local legend of the intervention by the Virgin Mary, when a statue of her reflected the sun, blinding and causing panic amidst the Brabantines. This miracle is still celebrated every year in May.

== Sources ==
- Boffa, Sergio (2004). Warfare in Medieval Brabant, 1356-1406. The Boydell Press.
- France, John (1999). Western Warfare in the Age of the Crusades, 1000–1300. Cornell University Press.
- Schnerb, Bertrand (2010). "Battle of Steppes". In Rogers, Clifford J. (ed.). The Oxford Encyclopedia of Medieval Warfare and Military Technology. Vol. 3. Oxford University Press.
