= Albert II of Brandenburg =

Margrave of Brandenburg from 1205 to 1220

Albert II

Margrave of Brandenburg
- Reign: 1205–1220
- Predecessor: Otto II
- Successor: John I and Otto III
- Born: c. 1177
- Died: 25 February 1220
- Spouse: Matilda of Groitzsch
- Issue: John I, Margrave of Brandenburg; Otto III, Margrave of Brandenburg; Matilda, Duchess of Brunswick-Lüneburg; Elisabeth
- House: House of Ascania
- Father: Otto I, Margrave of Brandenburg
- Mother: Ada of Holland

Albert II (c. 1177 – 25 February 1220) was a member of the House of Ascania who ruled as the margrave of Brandenburg from 1205 until his death in 1220.

== Life ==
Albert II was the youngest son of Otto I and his second wife Ada of Holland. His father Otto I promoted and directed the foundation of German settlement in the area, which had been Slavic until the 10th century.

=== Count of Arneburg ===
Albert II was, from 1184 onwards, Count of Arneburg in the Altmark. The Altmark belonged to Brandenburg, and his older brother Otto II claimed that this implied that the Ascanians owned Arneburg.

When Henry of Gardeleggen died in 1192, he left his domains to Albert II. But that caused a conflict between himself and his brother. He was temporarily imprisoned in 1194 by Otto.

In 1197, he joined the German Crusade of 1197. He was present at the inaugural meeting of the Teutonic Knights in 1198 in Acre.

=== Margrave of Brandenburg ===
Albert II inherited the Margraviate in 1205, after the death of his eldest brother Otto II.

In the dispute about the imperial crown between the Houses of Hohenstaufen and Guelph in the early 13th century, Albert initially supported the Hohenstaufen King Philip of Swabia, like Otto before him. After Philip's assassination in 1208, however, he changed sides, because Emperor Otto IV had assisted him in securing the Margraviate against the Danes, and had confirmed Ascanian ownership of Brandenburg in a deed in 1212.

During this period, Albert II had a lengthy dispute with Archbishop Albert I of Magdeburg. He also played an important rôle in the Brandenburg tithe dispute.

Albert II definitively secured the regions of Teltow, Prignitz and parts of the Uckermark for the Margraviate of Brandenburg, but lost Pomerania to the House of Griffins.

=== Death and succession ===
Albert II died in 1220. At the time, his two sons were still minors. Initially, archbishop Albert I of Magdeburg acted as regent. In 1221, however, Albert's widow, Countess Matilda, took up the regency. After her death in 1225, the brothers were declared legal adults and began ruling the Margraviate jointly.

== Legacy ==
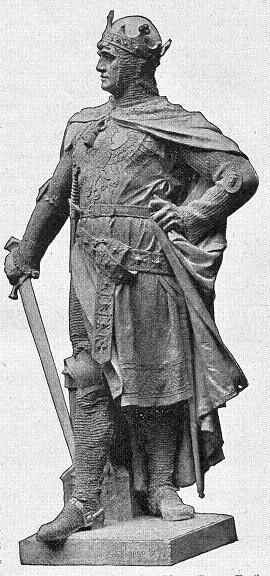
Monument in the Siegesallee in Berlin, 1898

Stephan Warnatsch describes Otto I's children as follows:

[They] continued the territorialisation drive that had been initiated [by their father] and, from the end of the 12th Century, as the influx of settlers grew stronger, and, consequently, more people were available to develop the territory, started to expand into the areas of Ruppin, and in particular, Barnim and Teltow. Moreover, the Oder region and the southern Uckermark were also targets of the Ascanian expansion. In all these areas, the Ascanians ran into opposition from competing local princes.

== Marriage and issue ==
In 1205, Albert married Matilda of Groitzsch (1185–1225), daughter of the Count Conrad II of Lusatia, a member of the House of Wettin, and wife Elizabeth, from the Polish Piast dynasty. They had four children:

- John I (born: c. 1213; died: 4 April 1266)
- Otto III "the Pious" (born: 1215; died: 9 October 1267)
- Matilda (died: 10 June 1261), married in 1228 Duke Otto I "the Child" of Brunswick-Lüneburg (1204–1252), a member of the House of Guelph
- Elizabeth (born: 1207; died: 19 November 1231), married in 1228 Landgrave Henry Raspe of Thuringia (1201–1247)

== Sources ==
- Lyon, Jonathan R. (2013). Princely Brothers and Sisters: The Sibling Bond in German Politics, 1100–1250. Cornell University Press.
- Johannes Schultz: Die Mark Brandenburg, Berlin Verlag, Berlin, 1961
- Gustav Albrecht: "Markgraf Albrecht II.", in: Hie gut Brandenburg alleweg! Geschichts- und Kulturbilder aus der Vergangenheit der Mark und aus Alt-Berlin bis zum Tode des Großen Kurfürsten, edited by Richard George, published by W. Pauli's Nachfolger, Berlin, 1900
- Helmut Assing: Brandenburg, Anhalt und Thüringen im Mittelalter. Askanier und Ludowinger beim Aufbau fürstlicher Territorialherrschaften, Böhlau Verlag, Cologne, 1997, ISBN 3-412-02497-X
- Helmut Assing: Die frühen Askanier und ihre Frauen, Bernburg, 2002
- Lutz Partenheimer: Albrecht der Bär – Gründer der Mark Brandenburg und des Fürstentums Anhalt, Böhlau Verlag, Cologne, 2001, ISBN 3-412-16302-3
- Jörg Rogge: Die Wettiner, Thorbecke Verlag, Stuttgart, 2005, ISBN 3-7995-0151-7
- Hans Spichalski: Heinrich Raspe IV. von Thüringen – Landgraf und Gegenkönig, Books on Demand GmbH, Norderstedt, 2009, ISBN 978-3-8370-5288-6, p. 96 ff.
- Warnatsch, Stephan (2000). Geschichte des Klosters Lehnin 1180–1542:Studien zur Geschichte, Kunst und Kultur der Zisterzienser. Vol. 12. Lukas Verlag. ISBN 3-931836-45-2.
- Otto von Heinemann (1875). "Albrecht II. (Markgraf von Brandenburg)" . Allgemeine Deutsche Biographie (in German). Vol. 1. Leipzig: Duncker & Humblot. p. 243.
- Willy Hoppe (1953). "Albrecht II.". Neue Deutsche Biographie (in German). Vol. 1. Berlin: Duncker & Humblot. p. 161. (full text online).

Albert II of Brandenburg House of Ascania Born: c. 1177 Died: 25 February 1220
| Preceded by Otto II | Margrave of Brandenburg; 1205–1220 | Succeeded by John I and Otto III |
