= Elisabeth of Brandenburg, Landgravine of Thuringia =

Landgravine of Thuringia from 1228 to 1231

Elisabeth of Brandenburg
- Born: c. 1206
- Died: 1231
- Noble family: House of Ascania
- Spouse: Henry Raspe
- Father: Albert II, Margrave of Brandenburg
- Mother: Matilda of Groitzsch

Elisabeth of Brandenburg (c. 1206 – 1231) a member of the House of Ascania. She was a Margravine of Brandenburg by birth and by marriage Landgravine of Thuringia.

She was the daughter of Margrave Albert II of Brandenburg and his wife Matilda of Groitzsch, the daughter of Landgrave Conrad II of Lusatia from the House of Wettin.

In 1228, she married Landgrave Henry Raspe of Thuringia, the later anti-king of Germany. The marriage remained childless.

Elisabeth died in 1231, at the age of 25, after three years of marriage. After her death, Henry married Gertrude of Babenberg and after Gertrude's death to Beatrice of Brabant. All three of his marriages were childless and after his death, the Emperor enfeoffed Thuringia to Henry III, the son of Henry Raspe's sister Jutta.
