= Florence of Holland =

Dutch nobleman and cleric (died 1210)

The seal of Bishop Florence.

Florence (or Florentius) (died 30 November 1210) was a late 12th century and early 13th century nobleman and cleric.

He was the son of Florence III, Count of Holland, and Ada of Huntingdon, sister of kings Malcolm IV and William I of Scotland.

Florence chose an ecclesiastical career, and before 1202 was provost of Utrecht. But his status as nephew of the current King of Scots, William, undoubtedly persuaded Florence to pursue a career in Scotland. In 1202, Florence was elected bishop of Glasgow, one of the most powerful and wealthy sees in the kingdom, and is recorded as Chancellor of Scotland on 4 November 1203.

It appears though that Florence was never consecrated, yet is found reserving his right when still only bishop-elect before 15 May 1207. He resigned that position to Pope Innocent III in December 1207. the reasons for his non-consecration are unknown.

Florence died as a monk at Middelburg in Zeeland.

== Notes ==
Political offices
Preceded by	Chancellor of Scotland; 1202–1210	Succeeded by William de Bosco
Religious titles
Preceded by William de Malveisin	Bishop of Glasgow; 1202–1207	Succeeded by Walter Capellanus
