= Dirk van Are =

Dirk II
- Bishop of Utrecht
- Church: Catholic Church
- Diocese: Archdiocese of Utrecht
- In office: 1198–1212

Personal details
- Died: 1212

Dirk van Are (? - 1212), also Dietrich II of Are, was bishop and lord of Utrecht in the thirteenth century. He appears to be one of those martial churchmen who were better qualified for the camp than the choir. He was Bishop of Utrecht from 1198 until 1212.

He was constantly embroiled with William I, Count of Holland, and each in turn was the prisoner of the other. He joined Louis II, Count of Loon, the son-in-law of William, in an attempt to dispossess him, but without success; for they were driven to take refuge under the walls of Utrecht. He contrived, however, to take Dordrecht, and burn and pillage it, but in the end he was obliged to give up his schemes.

He died at Deventer on 5 December 1212 after governing Utrecht for 14 years.

Catholic Church titles
Preceded by Dirk I	Bishop of Utrecht; 1198–1212	Succeeded by Otto I
