= Otto II of Brandenburg =

Margrave of Brandenburg from 1184 to 1205

Otto II
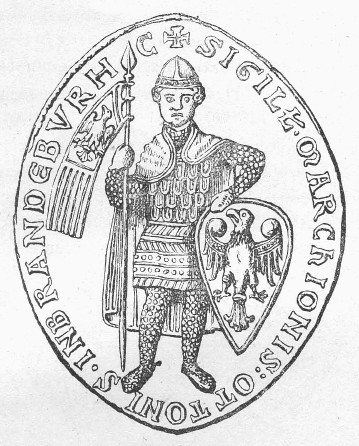
- Seal of Otto II

Margrave of Brandenburg
- Reign: 1184–1205
- Predecessor: Otto I
- Successor: Albert II
- Born: after 1147
- Died: 4 July 1205
- Spouse: Ada of Holland
- House: House of Ascania
- Father: Otto I
- Mother: Judith of Poland

Otto II (after 1147 – July 4, 1205), called The Generous (German: der Freigiebige), was the third Margrave of Brandenburg from 1184 until his death.

== Life ==
Otto II was born into the House of Ascania as the eldest son of Otto I and Judith, a daughter of the Piast Duke of Poland Bolesław III Wrymouth. Some time after his father died, Otto II married his father's widow, Ada of Holland. The marriage was ultimately childless however.

=== Margrave of Brandenburg ===
After succeeding his father, he improved the defense and settlement of Brandenburg and waged campaigns against the Slavs and Canute VI of Denmark. In the winter of 1198–99, he devastated Danish-occupied Pomerania and consolidated his territorial gains in the subsequent year with a campaign that pressed to Rügen and threatened Hamburg. In 1200 and 1203, he supported the Hohenstaufen king Philip of Swabia against the Welfen Holy Roman Emperor, Otto IV.

=== Succession ===
After his death, his half-brother Albert II inherited the margraviate.

== Sources ==
- Helmut, Assing (1997). Brandenburg, Anhalt und Thüringen im Mittelalter. Askanier und Ludowinger beim Aufbau fürstlicher Territorialherrschaften (in German). Cologne: Böhlau Verlag. ISBN 3-412-02497-X.
- Helmut, Assing (2002). Die frühen Askanier und ihre Frauen (in German). Bernburg.
- Lutz, Partenheimer (2001). Albrecht der Bär — Gründer der Mark Brandenburg und des Fürstentums Anhalt (in German). Cologne: Böhlau Verlag. ISBN 3-412-16302-3.
- Lyon, Jonathan R. (2013). Princely Brothers and Sisters: The Sibling Bond in German Politics, 1100–1250. Cornell University Press.

Preceded by Otto I	Margrave of Brandenburg; 1184–1205	Succeeded by Albert II
