= Otto I of Brandenburg =

Margrave of Brandenburg from 1170 to 1184

Otto I

Margrave of Brandenburg
- Reign: 1170–1184
- Predecessor: Albert the Bear
- Successor: Otto II
- Born: c. 1128
- Died: July 8, 1184
- Burial: Lehnin Abbey
- Spouse: Judith of Poland; Ada of Holland
- Issue: Otto II, Margrave of Brandenburg; Henry, Count of Tangermünde and Gardelegen; Albert II, Margrave of Brandenburg
- House: House of Ascania
- Father: Albert the Bear
- Mother: Sophie of Winzenburg

Otto I (c. 1128 – July 8, 1184) was the second Margrave of Brandenburg, from 1170 until his death.

== Life ==
Otto I was born into the House of Ascania as the eldest son of Albert I ("Albert the Bear"), who founded the Margraviate of Brandenburg in 1157, and his wife Sophie of Winzenburg. He had three sisters and six brothers, the best known of whom were Prince-Archbishop Siegfried of Bremen, and Count Bernhard of Anhalt, later Duke of Saxony.

Otto's year of birth is traditionally recorded as 1128, but recent historians have cast some doubts on the date. Pribislav of the Havolanes is known to have served as Otto's godfather and given the lands of Zauche bordering the Ascanian possessions as a gift upon the occasion; Partenheimer (2003) dates that event to 1123 or 1125.

In 1148, Otto married Judith of the Piast dynasty, sister of the Dukes of Poland Boleslaw IV and Mieszko III. Arrangements for the marriage were agreed upon during the Wendic Crusade (one of the Northern Crusades) in a meeting of January 6, 1148, in which Archbishop Friedrich of Wettin participated besides Otto and the two Polish dukes. According to Partenheimer (2003), the marriage was contracted in connection with the Ascanian efforts to support the Piast dynasty in opposition to King Conrad, who supported Wladyslaw II as legal ruler of Poland.

Otto had the following children:

- Otto II became his successor as Margrave of Brandenburg at Otto I's death in 1184
- Heinrich became Count of Gardelegen
- Albert II became Margrave of Brandenburg after the death of his brother Otto II in 1205

Otto was buried in the Lehnin Abbey, which he had helped build.

== Margrave of Brandenburg ==
=== Alongside his father (to 1170) ===
Otto governed from 1144 alongside his father Albert. He did not officially take the title Margrave of Brandenburg until his father's death in 1170, but as early as 1144 he is mentioned by that title along with Albert in a royal document, although Albert himself did not claim it until 1157. The father and son together shaped the House of Ascania's policy over several decades, together participating in meetings and decisions, and are both frequently mentioned in documents of the period. The pair were accompanied and supported in many cases by Otto's brothers, in particular the second-eldest, Hermann. Otto outlived his father, who lived to the then very old age of 70, by only 14 years.

=== Sole ruler (1170–1184) ===
The Margraviate of Brandenburg, which Otto finally took over from his father in 1170, did not at the time correspond to the later territory of Brandenburg. The old Margraviate was essentially only the eastern portion of Havelland and the Zauche. In the following 150 years under the Ascanians, it would expand to include many more regions, but during Otto's years as Margrave, his main goal was to stabilize and secure the Margraviate by intensifying settlement in the regions he controlled.

== Lehnin Abbey ==
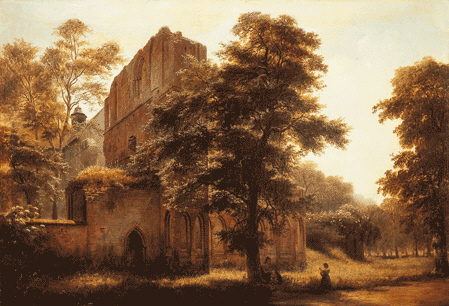
Lehnin Abbey ruins, 1858, by Eduard Gaertner

=== Founding by Otto I ===
In 1180, Otto founded the Lehnin Abbey in Zauche as the Margraviate's first monastery, in which he would be buried four years later. This Cistercian monastery became the house monastery and burial ground for the House of Ascania, and later also for the House of Hohenzollern. The first monks took up residence in 1183, coming from the Sittichenbach Abbey; construction of the church and cloisters began around 1190.

The monastery quickly developed into a wealthy abbey and strengthened the position of the Ascanians both by its great economic means and by the missionary work of its monks to the Slavs. By the time the monastery was secularized in 1542, it owned among other things 39 villages and the city of Werder.

=== Founding legend ===
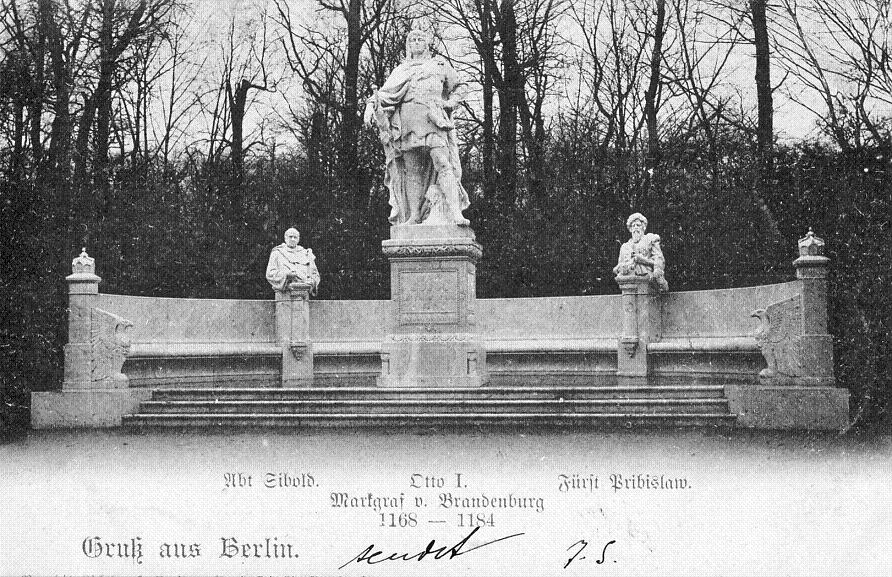
Monument group, with abbot Sibold (left) and Fürst Pribislaw

The abbey's founding legend is as follows. Otto fell asleep after an arduous hunt under an oak tree. In his dream, deer appeared which threatened to gore him with their antlers, and which he could not repel with his spear. In desperation Otto called Christ's name, whereupon the dream dissolved. When Otto related the strange dream to his companions, they interpreted the deer as a symbol for the pagan Slavs, and advised him to establish a monastery in honor of the Christian God to defend against paganism. Oak and deer as a result are on the Abbey's coat of arms.

== Monument to Otto I in Berlin ==
A monument to Otto was built by the sculptor Max Unger in 1898 on the former Siegesallee (Victory Avenue) in Tiergarten in Berlin, as part of the construction of a "boulevard of splendor" with monuments from the history of Brandenburg and Berlin (with the commissioning by Emperor William II). Under the direction of Reinhold Begas between 1895 and 1901, 27 sculptors created 32 sculptures of the rulers of Brandenburg and Prussia, each 2.75 m (9 ft) high. Each sculpture was flanked by two smaller busts of people who played an important role in the life of that ruler. In the case Otto I, the flanking busts were of his godfather Pribislav and the first Abbot of the Lehnin Abbey, Sibold, who according to legend was murdered.

== Sources ==
- Antwerpe, Heinrici de (1888). "Can. Brandenburg., Tractatus de urbe Brandenburg" (in German). Online edition by Tilo Köhn. Archived from the original on 2013-02-21.
- George, Richard (1900). Hie gut Brandenburg alleweg! Geschichts- und Kulturbilder aus der Vergangenheit der Mark und aus Alt-Berlin bis zum Tode des Großen Kurfürsten (in German). Berlin: Verlag von W. Pauli's Nachf.
- Otto von Heinemann (1887). "Otto I. (Markgraf von Brandenburg)" . Allgemeine Deutsche Biographie (in German). Vol. 24. Leipzig: Duncker & Humblot. pp. 658–659.
- Lyon, Jonathan R. (2013). Princely Brothers and Sisters: The Sibling Bond in German Politics, 1100–1250. Cornell University Press.
- Partenheimer, Lutz (2003). Albrecht der Bär (in German). Cologne: Böhlau Verlag. ISBN 3-412-16302-3.

Preceded by Albert I	Margrave of Brandenburg; 1170–1184	Succeeded by Otto II
