= Ada, Countess of Holland =

Countess regnant of Holland from 1203 to 1207

Ada

Count of Holland
- Reign: 1203 – 1207 jointly with Louis II of Loon
- Predecessor: Dirk VII
- Successor: William I
- Born: c. 1188
- Died: 1234/37
- Spouse: Louis II, Count of Loon (m. 1203; died 1218)
- Father: Dirk VII, Count of Holland
- Mother: Adelaide of Cleves

Ada (c. 1188 – 1234/37) was Countess regnant of Holland between 1203 and 1207, ruling jointly with her husband, Louis II of Loon. She was deposed and exiled by her paternal uncle, William I.

== Family ==
Ada was the only surviving daughter of Count Dirk VII of Holland and his wife Adelaide of Cleves.

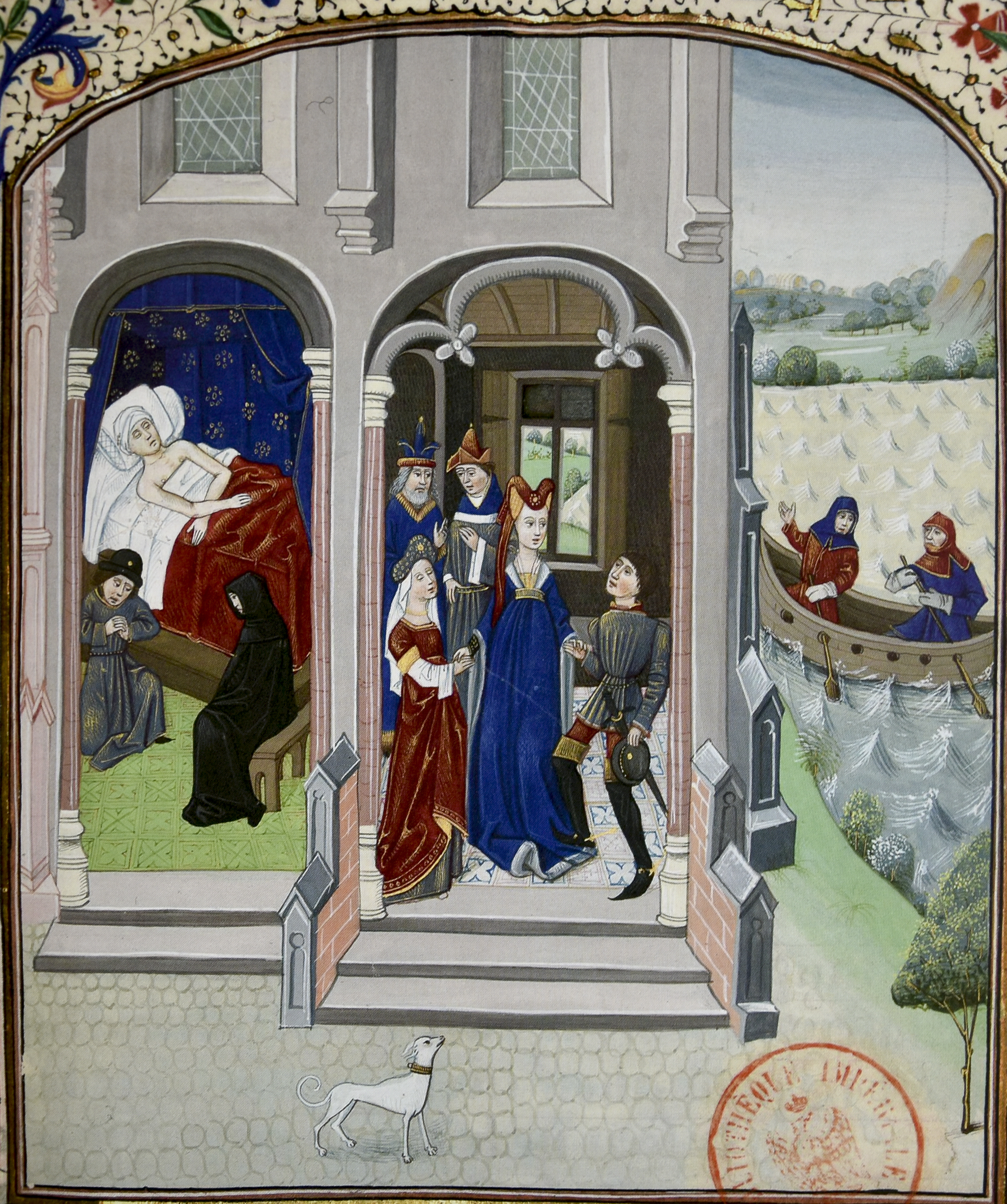
Marriage of Ada and Louis (15th century)

She succeeded her father but immediately had to deal with her uncle William, who claimed Holland for his own. Ada married Count Louis II of Loon to strengthen her position. She was in such a hurry, that she married even before her father was buried, which caused a scandal. These events led to the outbreak of the Loon War (1203–1206).

== Succession struggle ==
Ada was quickly captured by the supporters of William and taken prisoner in the citadel of Leiden. She was first imprisoned on the island of Texel and afterwards she was taken to John Lackland in the Kingdom of England. William had to accept Louis and Ada as count and countess at a treaty of Bruges in 1206.

Louis managed to free Ada in 1206, and the couple returned to Loon in 1207. Their reign was short-lived, since Emperor Otto IV regarded William to have more right to the title Count of Holland in 1208.

Ada did not accept the loss of her county, and she and Louis continued the fight. Ada remained childless. Louis died in 1218, leaving Ada to live out the rest of her life in obscurity. She was buried next to her husband in Herkenrode Abbey.

The civil war in Holland became part of a major international war with France and the Hohenstaufen dynasty on one side and England and the Welfs on the other. William could get Holland through good manoeuvring between both sides. Ada and Louis had to give up their claims. Many period histories up to the Protestant Reformation do not include her in the list of rulers of Holland.

Preceded by Dirk VII	Countess of Holland; 1203–1207 jointly with Louis II of Loon	Succeeded by William I
