= Louis II of Loon =

Count of Loon from 1191 to 1218

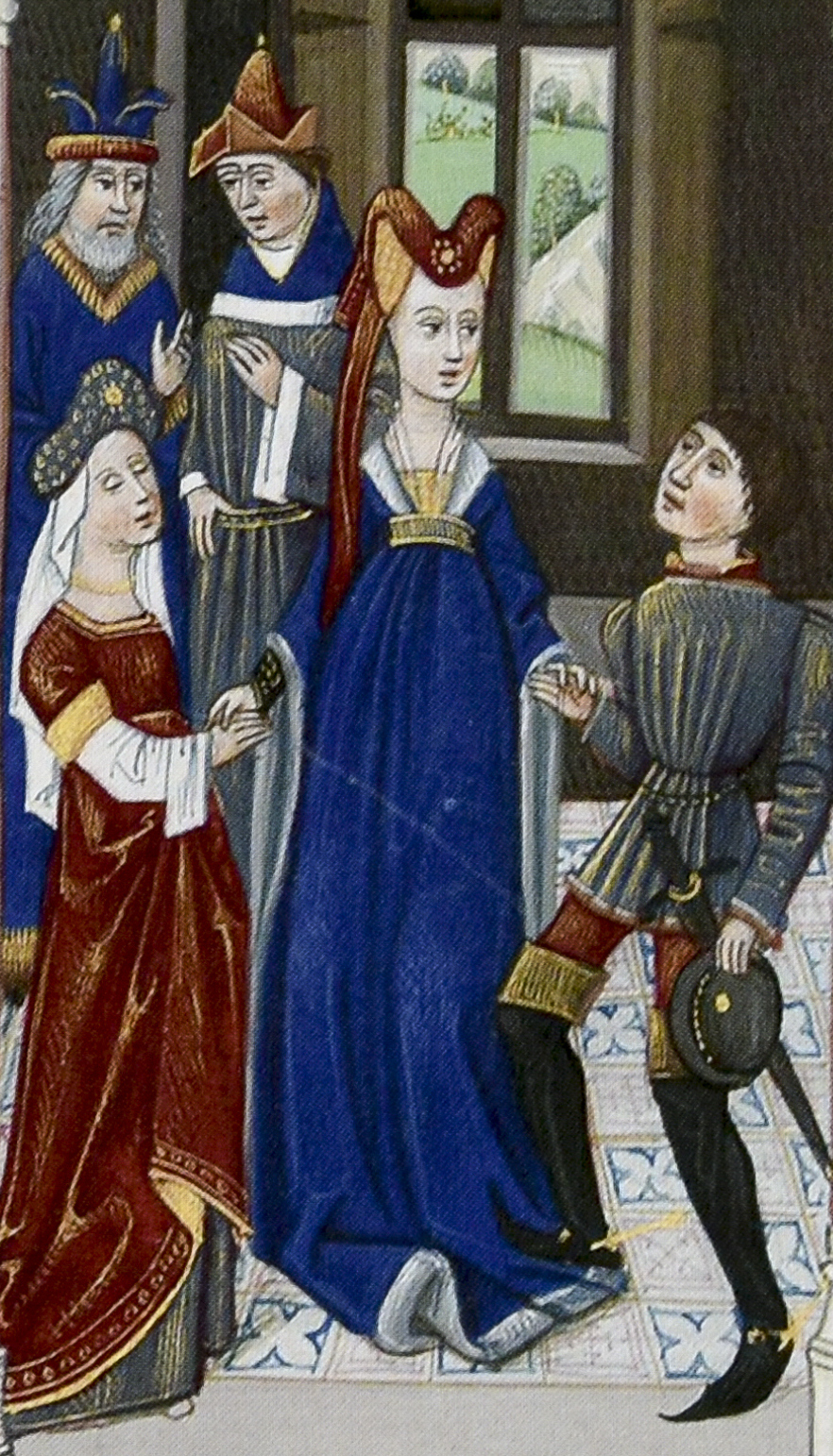
15th century depiction of Louis and Ada's wedding

Louis II was count of Loon from 1191 to 1218. He was the son of Gerard, Count of Looz, and Adelaide of Gelderland, daughter of Henry I, Count of Guelders, and Agnes of Arnstein, daughter of Louis III of Arnstein. He also claimed to be the legitimate Count of Holland during the Loon War (1203–1206).

He waged war against duke Henry I of Brabant for the county of Moha and the rights on Maastricht and Sint-Truiden. He had the rights of both cities, because he was regent of Duras. This culminated in the decisive Battle of Steppes in 1213 in which Louis prevailed.

Louis married Ada, Countess of Holland in 1203 after her father died and she inherited Holland. She waged war against her uncle William I of Holland, to defend her inheritance of Holland. Despite her marriage to Louis for extra protection, she was taken prisoner by the supporters of William in Leiden and brought first to Texel and then to England. Louis managed to free Ada in 1206, and the couple returned to Loon in 1207.

Louis sought support from Hugo de Pierrepont, bishop of Liège, whom he helped to win at the battle of Steppes in 1213.

Louis was poisoned in 1218. He was succeeded as Count of Loon by his nephew Louis III.

== Sources ==
Baerten, J., "Les origines des comtes de Looz et la formation territoriale du comté", Revue belge de philologie et d'histoire 43 (2), 1965

Preceded by Ada	Count of Holland; 1203–1206 jointly with Ada	Succeeded by William I
