= Dirk VII =

Count of Holland from 1190 to 1203

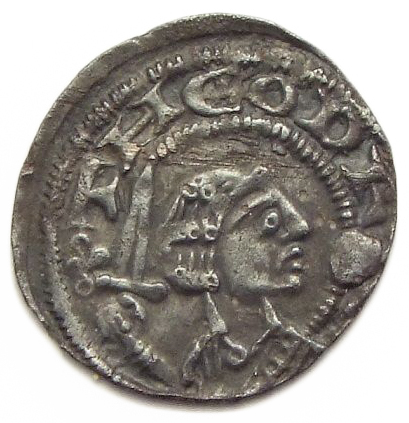
- Royal effigy on a silver penny of Dirk VII

Count of Holland
- Reign: 1190–1203
- Predecessor: Floris III
- Successor: Ada
- Died: November 4, 1203; Dordrecht
- Spouse: Adelaide of Cleves
- Issue: Aleidis; Petronilla; Ada
- Father: Floris III
- Mother: Ada of Huntingdon

Dirk VII (died 4 November 1203, in Dordrecht) was the count of Holland from 1190 to 1203. He was the elder son of Floris III and Ada of Huntingdon.

== Life ==
Due to a civil war in the Holy Roman Empire, Emperor Henry VI had to find ways to make friends. He supported Dirk by giving him the right to levy tolls on Flemish traders in Geervliet. Henry also gave Holland the Grote Waard (Dordrecht and its surroundings), at the cost of the bishopric of Utrecht. He also set aside the Salic law for the succession to the County of Holland, which meant that it could be inherited by a female heir. In 1196, Dirk temporarily gained the princely authority of the bishopric of Utrecht. This meant war with Count Otto I of Guelders. Otto was defeated at the Battle of the Grebbeberg. In 1197 Dirk van Are was elected as the new bishop. As such, he recovered the princely authority of Utrecht. The Hohenstaufens were losing the civil war, so Count Dirk changed sides and gave his allegiance to the Welfs.

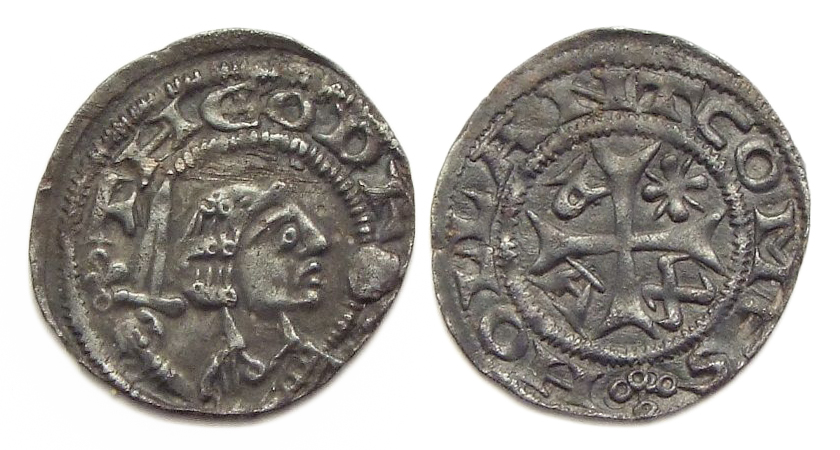
Silver penny or kopje of Dirk VII

The Frisians in Oostergo and Westergo supported Dirk's brother William, who invaded Holland. William was supported by some of the West Frisians as well.

In 1202 Dirk allied himself with Otto of Guelders, and they both attacked Brabant. Brabant claimed Holland, Utrecht and Guelders as dukes of Lotharingia. Den Bosch and Geertruidenberg were sacked during this campaign. Duke Henry I of Brabant took Dirk prisoner at Heusden. As well as having to pay a high ransom, he had to accept the Duke of Brabant as his overlord in southern Holland and the bishop of Utrecht as his overlord in northern Holland.

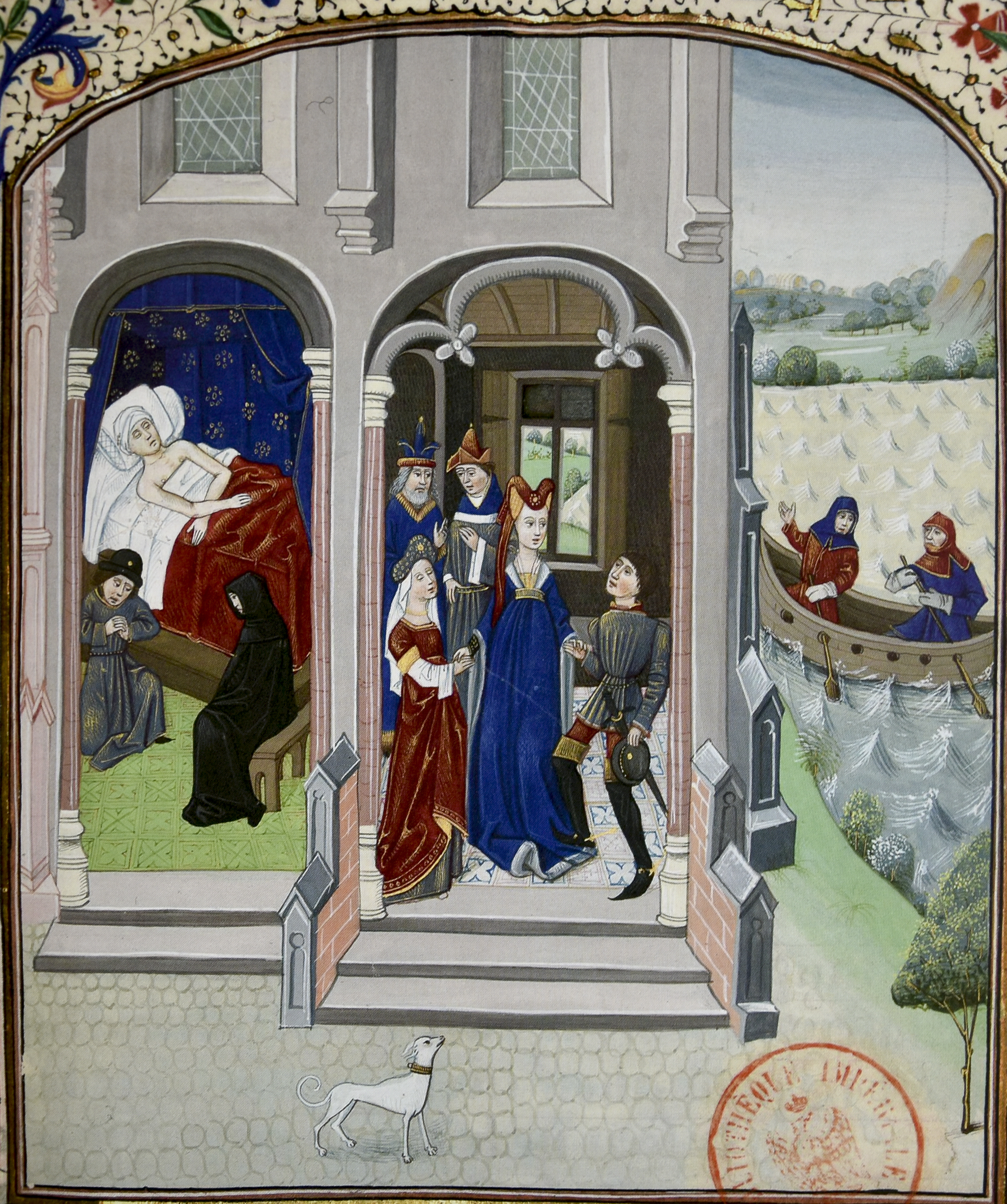
15th century depiction of Dirk VII on his death bed and the marriage of Ada to Louis of Loon

Dirk died on 4 November 1203 and was succeeded by his daughter Ada, who lost the county to Dirk's brother William.

== Family and children ==
In 1186 Dirk married Adelaide, a daughter of Count Dietrich II of Cleves and Ida of Louvain. They had three daughters:

1. Aleidis (died about 1203).
2. Petronilla (died before 1203)
3. Ada (c. 1188–1227)

Preceded by Floris III	Count of Holland; 1190–1203	Succeeded by Ada
