= Hugues de Pierrepont =

French bishop of Liège

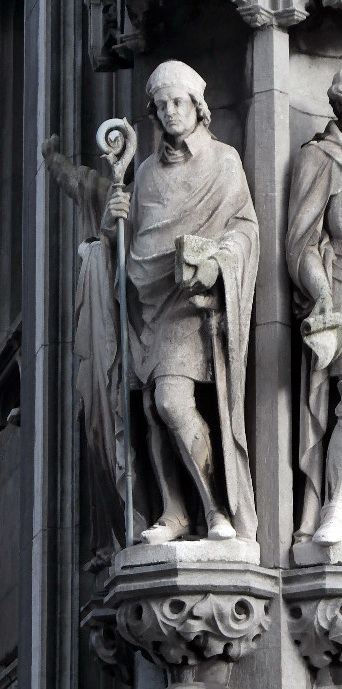
19th-century statue of Hugues de Pierrepont, Provincial Palace, Liège

Hugh de Pierrepont (died 1229) was bishop of Liège from 1200 to 1229. He was French in origin, from the diocese of Laon; he was son of Hugues de Wasnad. He was supported after his election by Baldwin VI of Hainaut.

He was a supporter of Emperor Frederick II.

He was victorious at the Battle of Steppes, 1213, leading an alliance against Henry I of Brabant.
