= List of English translations from medieval sources: E =

The list of English translations from medieval sources: E provides an overview of notable medieval documents—historical, scientific, ecclesiastical and literature—that have been translated into English. This includes the original author, translator(s) and the translated document. Translations are from Old and Middle English, Old French, Old Norse, Latin, Arabic, Greek, Persian, Syriac, Ethiopic, Coptic, Armenian, and Hebrew, and most works cited are generally available in the University of Michigan's HathiTrust digital library and OCLC's WorldCat. Anonymous works are presented by topic.

== List of English translations ==
=== EA–EG ===
Eanes de Zurara, Gomes. Gomes Eanes de Zurara (c. 1410 – c. 1474) was a Portuguese chronicler of the European Age of Discovery, the most notable after Fernão Lopes.

- The chronicle of the discovery and conquest of Guinea, written by Gomes Eannes de Azuarara (1896). Now first done into English by Charles Raymond Beazley and Edgar Prestage. Printed by the Hakluyt Society.
- Conquests & discoveries of Henry the Navigator; being the Chronicles of Azurara (1936). Edited by Virginia de Castro e Almeida, with a preface by Marshal Lyautey; translated by Bernard Miall.

Ebbo. Ebbo (c. 775 – 20 March 851) was the Archbishop of Rheims from 816 until 835 and again from 840 to 841.

- The life of Otto, apostle of Pomerania, 1060-1139, by Ebo and Herbordus (1920). Translated by Charles H. Robinson, D. D. Society for promoting Christian knowledge. A biography of Otto of Bamberg.

Eckhart, Meister. Meister Eckhart, also known as Eckhart von Hochheim (c. 1260 – c. 1328), was a German Catholic priest, theologian, philosopher and mystic.

- Meister Eckhart (1924–31). Translated with some omissions and additions by C. de B. Evans. Volume I is a translation of Deutsche Mystiker by Franz Pfeiffer, which is a continuation of Eckhart's work, and Volume II has further works of Eckhart from various sources.
- Meister Eckhart, a modern translation (1957). By Raymond Bernard Blakney. Treatises or Talks of instruction, Book of divine comfort, The aristocrat, About disinterest, sermons, various legends concerning Eckhart, and the defense prepared by Eckhart against charges of heresy.
- Meister Eckhart's sermons, first time translated into English by Claud Field.

Edda Sæmundar. Edda Sæmundar, also known as the Codex Regis, is a form of Poetic Edda, an untitled collection of Old Norse anonymous narrative poems in alliterative verse.

- Icelandic poetry; or, The Edda of Sæmund (1797). Translated into English verse, by Amos Simon Cottle and Robert Southey.
- The Elder Edda of Saemund Sigfusson (1907). Translated from the original Old Norse text into English by Benjamin Thorpe.
- The Volsunga saga (1906). Translated from the Icelandic by Eirikr Magnusson and William M. [sic] Morris; with introduction by H. Halliday Sparling; Rasmus B. Anderson, editor in chief. The Völsunga saga includes the story of Sigurd and Brunhild, and, most famously, Sigurd killing the serpent/dragon Fáfnir and obtaining the cursed ring Andvaranaut that Fáfnir guarded. In this manuscript, the saga leads straight in to Ragnars saga loðbrókar.
- Corpus poeticum boreale: the poetry of the Old Northern tongue, from the earliest times to the thirteenth century (1883). Edited, classified and translated, with introduction, excursus, and notes, by Gudbrand Vigfusson and F. York Powell. Volume I contaics the Eddic poetry, but in many cases the poems are cut up and rearranged.
- The elder or poetic Edda, commonly known as Saemund's Edda (1908). Edited and translated with introduction and notes by Olive Bray. Printed for the Viking Club.
- The Poetic Edda (1923). Translated from the Icelandic by Henry Adams Bellows; introduction by William O. Cord.
- The Poetic Edda (1928). Translated with an introduction and explanatory notes by Lee M. Hollander.
- The British Edda (1930). The great epic poem of the ancient Britons on the exploits of King Thor, Arthur or Adam and his knights in establishing civilization, reforming Eden and capturing the Holy Grail about 3380-3350 BC. Reconstructed for first time from the medieval mss, by Babylonian, Hittite, Egyptian, Trojan and Gothic keys, and done literally into English by L. A. Waddell. A reinterpretation of the poems, attempting to link them to England.
- The Ha︣vama︣l, with selections from other poems of the Edda, illustrating the wisdom of the North in heathen times (1923). Edited and translated by D. E. Martin Clarke. The Hávamál is presented as a single poem in the Codex Regius, a collection of Old Norse poems from the Viking age.

Edda Snorra Sturlusonar. Edda Snorra Sturlusonar is the Prose Edda attributed to Icelandic scholar, lawspeaker, and historian Snorri Sturluson.

- Northern antiquities; or, An historical account of the manners, customs, religion and laws, maritime expeditions and discoveries, language and literature of the ancient Scandinavians (1847). Translated from the French of Paul Henri Mallet, by Bishop Thomas Percy.
- The prose or younger Edda commonly ascribed to Snorri Sturluson (1842). Translated from the Old Norse by George Webbe Dasent.
- The younger Edda, also called Snorre's Edda of the prose Edda (1880). An English version of the foreword; the fooling of Gylfe, the afterword; Brage's talk, the afterword to Brage's talk, and the important passages in the Poetical diction (Skaldskaparmal). With an introduction, notes, vocabulary and index by Rasmus B. Anderson.
- The Prose Edda, by Snorri Sturluson (1916). Translated from the Icelandic, with an introduction, by Arthur Gilchrist Brodeur.

Eddius Stephanus. Eddius Stephanus, also known as Stephen of Ripon, was the author of the eighth-century hagiographic text Vita Sancti Wilfrithi, a biography of Saint Wilfrid.

- The life of Bishop Wilfrid (1927). By Eddius Stephanus; text, translation, and notes by Bertram Colgrave.

Edessa. Ancient Syriac documents relative to the earliest establishment of Christianity in Edessa and the neighbouring countries: from the year after our Lord's Ascension to the beginning of the fourth century (1864). Discovered, edited, translated, and annotated by William Cureton; with a preface by William Wright (orientalist).

Edeyrn, Davod Aur. Davod Aur Edeyrn, "The Golden-tongued" fl. 1270, was a Welsh bard and grammarian.

- Dosparth Davod Aur Edeyrn; or, The ancient Welsh grammar, which was compiled by royal command in the thirteenth century by Edeyrn the golden tongued, to which is added Y Pum Llyfr Kerddwriaeth, or the rules of Welsh poetry, originally compiled by Davydd Ddu Athraw, in the fourteenth, and subsequently enlarged by Simwnt Vychan, in the sixteenth century (1856). With English translations and notes by the rev. John Williams Ab Ithel. (1856). Translated by Rev. John Williams Ab Ithel. Society for the publication of ancient Welsh manuscripts.

Edmund the Martyr. Edmund the Martyr (also known as St Edmund or Edmund of East Anglia, died 20 November 869) was king of East Anglia from about 855 until his death.

- Saint Edmund king and martyr; a history of his life and times with an account of the translation of his incorrupt body (1893). From original mss., by the Rev. J. B. Mackinlay, O.S.B.
- Corolla Sancti Eadmundi. The garland of Saint Edmund, king and martyr (1907). Edited, with a preface, by Lord Francis Hervey.

Edmund Rich. Edmund Rich (also known as Edmund of Abingdon, c. 1174 – 1240) was an English Catholic prelate who served as Archbishop of Canterbury.

- The life of St. Edmund, by Matthew Paris (1996). Translated, edited and with a biography by C. H. Lawrence. A French-verse history of the life of Edmund Rich, Archbishop of Canterbury from 1233 to 1240. Based on Paris's own Latin prose life of Rich, composed in the late 1240s, which drew on a collection of materials made at Pontigny, statements from Robert Bacon and Richard Wych, Bishop of Chichester, and other materials including from Paris's own histories.
- The mirror of Saint Edmund (1905). Done into modern English by Francesca M. Steele; with a preface by Vincent McNabb.

Education, Later Roman. Later Roman education in Ausonius, Capella and the Theodosian code (1909). Translation with commentary by Percival R. Cole. Education as descripbed by Decimius Magnus Ausonius, Martianus Capella and the Codex Theodosianus.

Edward of Norwich. Edward of Norwich (c. 1373 – 25 October 1415) was 2nd Duke of York, an English nobleman, military commander and magnate. He translated the medieval hunting book The Master of Game.

- The master of game (1909). By Edward, second duke of York; the oldest English book on hunting; edited by Wm. A. and F. Baillie-Grohman. With a foreword by Theodore Roosevelt.

Edward the Confessor. Edward the Confessor (c. 1003 – 5 January 1066) was an Anglo-Saxon English king and saint. Usually considered the last king of the House of Wessex, he ruled from 1042 until his death in 1066.

- Lives of Edward the Confessor (1858). Edited by Henry Richards Luard. The first and second works in this collection are based on two writings of Ethelred, abbot of Rievaulx, De genealogia regum anglorum and Vita et miracula S. Edwardi, regis et confessoris.
- The saga of Edward the Confessor. Translated by George Webbe Dasent. In: Volume I of Icelandic sagas and other historical documents relating to the settlements and descents of the Northmen on the British Isles (1887). Published by the authority of the lords commissioners of Her Majesty's Treasury, under the direction of the Master of the Rolls.

Egbert of Schönau. Egbert of Schönau (c. 1120 – 1184) was Benedictine abbot of Schönau, a writer, and brother of the mystic Elisabeth of Schönau, whose life he recorded.

- The soliloquy of Egbert (1843), translated by Edward J. S. Sheperd, British Magazine, XXIV, pgs. 26–34.

Egils saga Skallagrimasonar. Egils saga Skallagrimasonar (Egil's saga) is an Icelandic saga on the lives of the clan of Egill Skallagrímsson, an Icelandic farmer, viking and skald. The saga spans the years c. 850–1000 and traces the family's history from Egill's grandfather to his offspring. The saga is often attributed to Snorri Sturluson.

- The story of Egil Skallagrimsson: being an Icelandic family history of the ninth and tenth centuries (1893). Translated from the Icelandic by the Rev. William Charles Green.
- Höfuðlausn, Sonatorrek and Arinbjarnarkviða, poems by Egill Skallagrímsson. In: Translations from the Icelandic: being select passages introductory to Icelandic literature (1908). Translated and edited by the Rev. W. C. Green.
- Egil's saga (1930). Done into English out of the Icelandic with an introduction, notes, and an essay on some principles of translation by Eric Rücker Eddison.
- The ransome of Egill the Scald (Höfuðlausn). In: Northern antiquities; or, An historical account of the manners, customs, religion and laws, maritime expeditions and discoveries, language and literature of the ancient Scandinavians (1809). Translated from the French of Paul Henri Mallet, by Bishop Thomas Percy.
- "The poet Egil Skallagrimsson and his poem, "On the irreparable loss of his sons" (1936). Lee M. Hollander, Scandinavian studies and notes, XIV.
- "Egil Skallagrimsson's Headranson (Hqfudlausn)" (1937). Lee M. Hollander, Scandinavian studies and notes, XV.
- “The Lay of Arinbiorn (Arinbiarnarkviþa)” (1937). Lee M. Hollander, Scandinavian studies and notes, XV.

Egypt and Aragon. Egypt and Aragon: Embassies and Diplomatic Correspondence Between 1300 and 1330 A.D. (1938). By Aziz Suryal Atiya. Diplomatic correspondence between the sultan of Egypt and the king of Aragon.

Egyptian tales, Coptic. See Coptic texts.

Egyptian tales, Muslim. Medieval tales from Egypt after the advent of Islam. See also Arabic literature.

- Sacred books and early literature of the East, Volume II (1917). With historical surveys of the chief writings of each nation. Under the editorship of a staff of specialists directed by Prof. Charles Francis Horne (1870–1942).
- Egyptian tales and romances: pagan, Christian and Muslim (1931). Translated by British Egyptologist and orientalist Sir Ernest Alfred Wallis Budge (1857–1934). Includes: (1) The story of Muhammad the Clever One; (2) The story of the Bear-of-the-Kitchen; (3) The story of Fulla, the Shaykha of the Arabs; (4) The story of the fisherman and his son; (5) The story of the Princess Datal; (6) The story of the virtous maiden and the wicked Kādī and Wazīr; (7) The story of the prince who learned the trade of the silk-weaver; (8) The story of the amorous prince; (9) The story of the itinerant musician and his son; (10) The story of the maiden and the singing nightingale; (11) The story of the Princess Arab-Zandīq; and, (12) The story of the prince and his horse. (Note: The Muslim tales contained in this book were translated into English from the book Contes Arabes Modernes, by Guillaume Spitta-Bey (1883), originally in French: I. Histoire de Mohammed l'Avisé; II. Histoire d'Ours de cuisine; III. Histoire de la Dame des Arabes Jasmin; IV. Histoire du pêcheur et de son fils; V. Histoire de Dalâl; VI. Histoire de la fille vertueuse; VII. Histoire du prince qui apprit un métier; VIII. Histoire du prince amoureux; IX. Histoire du musicien ambulant et de son fils; X. Histoire du rossignol chanteur; XI. Histoire d'Arab-Zandyq; XII. Histoire du prince et de son cheval.)
- The book of the thousand nights and one night (1882–1884). Now first completely done into English prose and verse, from the original Arabic. Translated by English poet John Payne (1842–1916). The Arabic original descends from an unknown text, now lost, which is represented by Galland's manuscript and the modern Egyptian recession.

Egyptian tales, pagan. Pagan tales of Egypt, translated into English.

- Egyptian tales and romances: pagan, Christian and Muslim (1931). Translated by British Egyptologist and orientalist Sir Ernest Alfred Wallis Budge (1857–1934). Includes. (1) Stories of the marvelous deeds wrought by the magicians of the Old Kingdom; (2) The appeals of the wronged peasant Khunanpu (the Eloquent Peasant); (3) The story of Prince Sanehe; (4) The shipwrecked sailor and his adventures; (5) The tale of the two brothers; (6) How the witch-goddess Isis usurped the power of Rā the Sun God; (7) The price who was predestined to die a violent death; (8) Un-Amen's mission to the Lebanon; (9) How the god Khonsu expelled a devil from the Princess of Bekhten; (10) Setma Khāmuas and his converse with the dead; (11) The story of Khāmuas and his son Sa-Asar (Tale of Setne Khamwas and Si-Osire); and (12) Setom Khāmuas as the saviour of Egypt.

=== EH–EM ===
Ehingen, Georg von. Georg (Jörg) von Ehingen (1428–1508) was a German imperial knight, diplomat and traveler who visited several European courts during the 15th century.

- The diary of Jörg von Ehingen (1929). Translated and edited by Malcolm Letts.

Einarr Hafliðason. Einarr Hafliðason (15 September 1307 – 22 September 1393) was an Icelandic priest and author.

- The Life of Laurence, Bishop of Hólar in Iceland (1890). Translated by Oliver Elton. A translation of the Laurentius saga, describing the life of Icelandic bishop Laurentius Kálfsson, bishop of Hólar.

Einars þáttr Sokkasonar. Einars þáttr Sokkasonar (The Tale of Einarr Sokkason) or Grœnlendinga þáttr II (The Tale of the Greenlanders) is a short medieval Icelandic tale (þáttr). It is preserved in the manuscript Flateyjarbók which was written by Magnús Þórhallsson. The author of the tale itself is unknown. The tale takes place in Greenland, but unlike Grœnlendinga þáttr (I), it makes no mention of Vinland.

- The tale of the Greenlanders. In Origines islandicae; a collection of the more important sagas and other native writings relating to the settlement and early history of Iceland (1905). Edited and translated by Gudbrand Vigfusson and F. York Powell.

Einhard. Einhard (c. 775 – 14 March 840) was a Frankish scholar and courtier. Einhard was a dedicated servant of Charlemagne and his son Louis the Pious. His main work is a biography of Charlemagne, the Vita Karoli Magni, "one of the most precious literary bequests of the early Middle Ages".

- The history of the translation of the blessed martyrs of Christ, Marcellinus and Peter (1926). The English version by Barrett Wendell.
- The letters of Einhard, translated by Henry Preble, annotated by Joseph Cullen Ayers. In: Papers of the American Church Society, ad. set. I (1913), pgs. 107–158.
- Life of the Emperor Karl the Great (1877). Translated from Eginhard by William Glaister..
- Life of Charlemagne (1898). By Eginhard, translated from the text of the Monumenta Germaniæ by Samuel Epes Turner, A.M.
- Early lives of Charlemagne (1922)., by Eginhard & the Monk of St. Gall. Translated and edited by Professor Arthur James Grant. Includes work by Notker the Stammerer, monk of St. Gall.

Eiríks saga rauða. Eiríks saga rauða, or The Saga of Erik the Red, is an Icelandic saga on the Norse exploration of North America. The original saga is thought to have been written in the 13th century. It is preserved in somewhat different versions in two manuscripts: Hauksbók (14th century) and Skálholtsbók (15th century). It chronicles the life and expedition of Thorfinn Karlsefni and his wife Gudrid, also recounted in the Saga of the Greenlanders. For this reason it was formerly also called Þorfinns saga karlsefnis. It also details the events that led to the banishment of Erik the Red to Greenland and the preaching of Christianity by his son Leif Erikson as well as his discovery of Vinland.

- Eirik the Red's Saga (1880). Translated by the Rev. J Sephton. The Literary and Philosophical Society of Liverpool, XXXIV, pgs. 171–212.
- The Vinland sagas (2008). The Icelandic sagas about the first documented voyages across the north Atlantic: the saga of the Greenlanders and Eirik the Red's saga. Translated by Keneva Kunz with an introduction and notes by Gísli Sigurđsson.

Ekkehardus I. Ekkehardus I (Ekkehard I, died 14 January 973), called Major or Senex (the Elder), was a monk of the Abbey of Saint Gall.

- Walter and Hildegund, in: Gudrun, Beowulf and Roland with other mediaeval tales (1884), by John Gibb. Note: this is not a translation but a retelling of the story.
- The poem of Walter, in: Survivals in Old Norwegian of medieval English, French, and German literature, together with the Latin versions of the heroic legend of Walter of Aquitaine (1941), translated by H. M. Smyser and F. P. Magoun.

El Cid. See Cid Campeador, El.

Eldad ben Mahli ha-Dani. Eldad ben Mahli ha-Dani (fl. c. 851 – c. 900) was a ninth-century Jewish merchant, traveller, and philologist.

- Eldad the Danite, in Jewish travellers in the Middle Ages: 19 firsthand accounts (1930). Edited and with an introduction by Elkan Nathan Adler. Broadway travellers.

Elian bar Shināya. Elian bar Shināya (11 February 975 – 18 July 1046) was an Assyrian cleric of the Church of the East, who served as bishop of Beth Nuhadra (1002–1008) and archbishop of Nisibis (1008–1046).

- A treatise on Syriac grammar by Mâr (I) Eliâ of Sob â (1887). Edited and translated from the manuscripts in the Berlin Royal library by Richard J. H. Gottheil.

Elisha, Vartabed. Vartabed Elisha (410 – 475) was an Armenian historian from the time of late antiquity, best known as the author of History of Vardan and the Armenian War, a history of the Battle of Avarayr, a fifth-century Armenian revolt led by Vardan Mamikonian against the suppression of Christianity under Sassanid Iranian rule.

- The history of Vartan, and of the battle of the Armenians; containing an account of the religious wars between the Persians and Armenians, by Elisaeus, bishop of the Arnadunuans (1830). Translated from the Armenian by Karl Friedrich Neumann.

Elizabeth I. Elizabeth I (1533–1603) was Queen of England and Ireland from 1558 until her death.

- Queen Elizabeth's Englishings of Boethius, Plutarch and Horace (1899). De consolatione philosophiae, A.D. 1593; Plutarch, De curiositate [1598]; Horace, De arte poetica (part) A.D. 1598. Edited from the unique manuscript, partly in the Queen's hand, in the Public Record Office, London, by Miss Caroline Pemberton. In Early English Text Society, Original Series, 113.
- The girlhood of Queen Elizabeth, a narrative in contemporary letters (1909). by Frank Arthur Mumby (1872–1954). With an introduction by Sir Robert Sangster Rait (1874–1936).
- The mirror of the sinful soul (1897). A prose translation of The Miroir or Glasse of the Synneful Soul from the French, made in 1544 by the Princess (afterwards Queen) Elizabeth, then eleven years of age. Reprodued in facsimile, with portrait, for the Royal Society of Literature of the United Kingdom, and edited, with an introduction and notes, by Percy W. Ames (1853–1919).
- Queene Elizabethes achademy (by Sir Humphrey Gilbert) (1879). Edited by English philologist Frederick James Furnivall (1825–1910). A booke of percedence. The ordering of a funerall, &c. Varying versions of The good wife, The wise man, &c. Maxims, Lydgate's Order of fools, A poem on heraldly, Occleve on Lord's men, &c. With essays on early Italian and German books of courtesy, by William Michael Rossetti (1829–1919) and Eugen Oswald (1826–1912). In Early English Text Society, Extra Series, 8.

Emperor Constant. The tale of King Coustans, the emperor (1912). Done out of the ancient French into English by William Morris.

=== EN–EX ===
England, historical sources 1. "A complete history of England: with the lives of all the kings and queens thereof; from the earliest account of time, to the death of His late Majesty King Williaam III (1706). Containing a faithful relation of all affairs of state, ecclesiastical and civil. The whole illustrated with large and useful notes, taken from divers manuscripts, and other good authors: and the effiges of the kings and queens ... with alphabetical indexes." By John Strype, John Hughes and White Kennett.

- The Angevins and the Charter (1154-1216) (1913). The beginning of English law, the invasion of Ireland and the crusades. Translations of statutes and miscellaneous sources by Stanley Tease Toyne.
- The Chronicles of the White Rose of York (1845). A series of historical fragments, proclamations, letters, and other contemporary documents relating to the reign of King Edward the Fourth; with notes and illustrations, and a copious index. Modernized by John Allen Giles.
- Chronicque de la traïson et mort de Richart Deux roy Dengleterre, mise en lumière d'après un manuscrit de la Bibliothèque royale de Paris, autrefois conservé dans l'abbaye de S. Victor; avec les variantes fourniés par dix autres manuscrits, des éclaircissements, et un glossaire (1846). By Benjamin Williams. French text with English translation. A chronicle of Richard II of England.
- Complaint and reform in England, 1436-1714 (1938). Fifty writings of the time on politics, religion, society, economics, architecture, science, and education. Arranged with introductions by William Huse Dunham, jr. and Stanley Pargellis.
- Documents illustrating the history of civilization in medieval England (1066-1500) (1926). Compiled by R. Trevor Davies, with two maps.
- Documents illustrative of English church history (1896). Compiled from original sources by Henry Gee and William John Hardy.
- Eadgar's establishment of monasteries. In: Leechdoms, wortcunning, and starcraft of early England (1864). Collected and edited by the Rev. Oswald Cockayne.
- Educational charters and documents 598 to 1909 (1911). By Arthur Francis Leach.
- Edward III and his wars, 1327-1360 (1887). Extracts concerning Edward III of England from the chronicles of Jean Froissart, Jehan le Bel, Henry Knighton, Adam of Murimuth, Robert of Avesbury, the Chronicle of Lanecost, the state papers and other contemporary records. Arranged and edited by William James Ashley.
- England before the Norman conquest (1926). By Raymond Wilson Chambers, with a foreword on Roman Britain by M. Cary. England prior to the Norman Conquest of 1066.
- England in the time of Wycliffe (1895). By Edward Potts Cheyney. The times of John Wycliffe (c. 1328 – 31 December 1384), an English scholastic philosopher, Christian reformer, Catholic priest, and a theology professor at the University of Oxford.
- England under Henry III (1924). Illustrated from sources contemporary to Henry III of England, by Margaret A. Hennings.
- England under the early Tudors (1485–1529) (1925). Illustrated from contemporary sources by Charles Harold Williams. A history of England under the House of Tudor from Henry VII of England through half of the reign of Henry VIII of England.

England, historical sources 2. A history of England, from the defeat of the Armada to the death of Elizabeth (1914). With an account of English institutions during the later sixteenth and early seventeenth centuries. By Edward Potts Cheyney.

- England under the Lancastrians (1921). By Jessie H. Buckland (Flemming), with a preface by Albert F. Pollard. England under the House of Lancaster.
- England under the Yorkists, 1460-1485 (1920). Illustrated from contemporary sources, by Isobel D. Thornley. With a preface by A. F. Pollard. England under the House of York.
- English and Norse documents relating to the reign of Ethelred the Unready (1930). By Margaret Ashdown. Contains the Battle of Maldon and parts of the Anglo-Saxon Chronicle (978–1017) and from several sagas.
- English economic history (1914). Select documents compiled by Alfred Edward Bland, Philip Anthony Brown and Richard Henry Tawney.
- The growth of Parliament and the war with Scotland (1216-1307) (1914). By William Dunkeld Robieson.
- Illustrations of Chaucer's England (1918). Edited by Dorothy Hughes, with a preface by Albert F. Pollard.
- The Jews of Angevin England (1893). Documents and records from Latin and Hebrew sources, printed and manuscripts for the first time collected and translated by Joseph Jacobs.
- King's letters, from the days of Alfred to the accession of the Tudors (1903). Newly edited by Robert Steele.
- Letters and papers illustrative of the wars of the English in France during the reign of Henry the Sixth, king of England (1861). Edited by the Rev. Joseph Stevenson.
- Letters of Edward, Prince of Wales, written in Sussex in the year 1305 (1849). By William Henry Blaauw. Extracted from an ancient ms. In the Chapter-House, Westminster. Sussex Archaeological Collections.
- Letters of the kings of England (1850). Now first collected from royal archives, and other authentic sources, private as well as public. Edited, with an historical introduction and notes, by James Orchard Halliwell.
- Letters to Ralph de Nevill, Bishop of Chicester,1222-1244, and Chancellor to King Henry III (1850). By William Henry Blaauw. Sussex Archaeological Collections.
- Le livere de reis de Brittanie, e, Le livere de reis de Engleterre (1865). Edited by John Hulbert Glover (died 1860), Antiquary Librarian to Queen Victoria. Published by the authority of the lords commissioners of Her Majesty's Treasury, under the direction of the Master of the Rolls. Based on the work of Peter of Ickham.
- The misrule of Henry III (1887). Extracts from the writings of Matthew Paris, Robert Grosseteste, Adam of Marsh, etc. Selected and arranged by the Rev. W. Holden Hutton.
- Negotiations between the ambassadors of France and England, A.D. 1449. In: Narratives of the expulsion of the English from Normandy, M.CCCC.XLIX.-M.CCC.L.(1863). Edited from manuscripts in the Imperial library at Paris, by the Rev. Joseph Stevenson. Published by the authority of the lords commissioners of Her Majesty's Treasury, under the direction of the Master of the Rolls.

England, historical sources 3. The Normans in England (1066-1154) (1921). Compiled by Alfred Edward Bland. Bell's English history source books.

- The political songs of England, from the reign of John to that of Edward II (1839). Edited and translated by Thomas Wright.
- "The principal navigations, voyages, traffiques & discoveries of the English nation, made by sea or over-land to the remote and farthest distant quarters of the earth at any time within the compasse of these 1600 yeeres" (1903–1905). By Richard Hakluyt. The Hakluyt Society, Extra Series.
- The reformation and the renaissance (1485–1547)(1913). Compiled by Fred W. Bewsher.
- The reign of Henry VII from contemporary sources (1913). Selected and arranged in three volumes, with an introduction, by Albert Frederick Pollard.
- "A relation, or rather A true account, of the island of England; with sundry particulars of the customs of these people, and of the royal revenues under King Henry the Seventh, about the year 1500" (1847). Translated from the Italian, with notes, by Charlotte Augusta Sneyd. Printed for the Camden Society.
- Richard II in Ireland, 1394-5, and submissions of the Irish chiefs (1927). By Edmund Curtis.
- Royal and historical letters during the reign of Henry the Fourth, king of England and of France, and lord of Ireland (1860). Edited by the Rev. Francis Charles Hingeston. Rolls Series, 18.
- The royal letter book; being a collection of royal letters from the reign of William I to George V (1937). Edited with a prefatory note by Herbert Van Thal, with a foreword by Arthur Bryant.
- Select English historical documents of the ninth and tenth centuries (1914). Edited by Florence Elizabeth Harmer. Anglo-Saxon texts with English translations.
- Selections from the sources of English history; being a supplement to text-books of English history B.C. 55-A.D. 1832 (1899). Arranged and edited by Charles W. Colby.
- Simon de Montfort & his cause, 1251-1266 (1888). Extracts from the writings of Robert of Gloucester, Matthew Paris, William Rishanger, and Thomas of Wykes, among others, concerning Simon de Montfort, 6th Earl of Leicester. Selected and arranged by the Rev. William Holden Hutton. English history by contemporay writers.
- Social life in Britain from the conquest to the reformation (1919). Compiled by George Gordon Coulton. The Middle English texts are not modernized, but French and Latin have been translated.
- Source problems in English history (1915). By Albert Beebe White and Wallace Notestein with an introduction by Professor Dana Carleton Munro.
- Strongbow's conquest of Ireland (1888). With illustrations and map, by Francis Pierrepont Barnard. A history of Richard de Clare, 2nd Earl of Pembroke.
- Transcript of a manuscript relating to Henry the Fifth of England, preserved in the King's Library at Paris. French text with translation by John Gordon Smith. Transactions of the Royal Society of Literature of the United Kingdom (1829), Volume 2.
- “Unpublished Letters from Richard II in Ireland, 1394-5.” by Edmund Curtis. Proceedings of the Royal Irish Academy. Section C: Archaeology, Celtic Studies, History, Linguistics, Literature, vol. 37, 1924.
- Village life in the fifteenth century (1928). Illustrated from contemporary sources, by Winfred Ida Haward and Helen Margaret Duncan.
- War and misrule (1307-1399) (1913). Selected by Amy Audrey Locke.
- The welding of the race ("449"-1066) (1913). Compiled by the Rev. John E. W. Wallis.
- York and Lancaster, 1399-1485 (1914). Compiled by W. Garmon Jones.

England, histories of. Select translations of works related to the history of England. See also Chronicles of England and London.

- Church historians of England. Translated from the Latin by English archivist Joseph Stevenson (1806–1895) Includes: The Historical Works of the Venerable Beda; The Anglo-Saxon Chronicle, The Chronicle of Florence of Worcester; The Chronicle of Fabius Ethelweerd, Asser's Annals of King Alfred, The Book of Hyde, The Chronicles of John Wallingford, The History of Ingulf, Gaimar; The History of the Kings of England, and of His own Times, by William of Malmesbury; The Historical Works of Simeon of Durham; The Chronicles of John and Richard of Hexham, The Chronicle of Holyrood, The Cronicle of Melrose, Jordan Fantosme's Chronicle, Documents Respecting Canterbury and Winchester; The History of William of Newburgh, The Chronicles of Robert De Monte; History of King Henry The First; The Acts of Stephen, King of England, and Duke of Normandy; Giraldus Cambrensis Concerning The Introduction of Princes; Richard of Devizes; The History of the Archbishops of Canterbury, by Gervase, Monk of Canterbury; Robert of Gloucester's Chronicle; The Chronicle of the Isle of Man; The Life and Defence of John Foxe; The Acts and Monuments of John Foxe; The Acts and Monuments of John Foxe.
- The chronicle of Richard of Devizes, including Richard of Cirencester's Description of Britain (1841). Translated and edited by English historian John Allen Giles (1808–1884).
- Antiquitates Celto-Normannicae (1786). Containing the Chronicle of Man and the isles, abridged by Camden, and now first published, complete, from the original ms. in the British Musaeum: with an English translation, and notes: to which are added extracts from the Annals of Ulster, and Sir J. Ware's Antiquities of Ireland, British topography by Ptolemy, Richard of Cirencester, the geographer of Ravenna, and Andrew bishop of Cathness : together with accurate catalogues of the Pictish and Scottish kings / by the Rev. James Johnstone (died 1798).
- The Historical collections of a citizen of London in the fifteenth century (1876). Edited by British historian James Gairdner (1828–1912). Includes the Chronicle of London by Sir William Gregory (c. 1400–1467). With an Appendix: Mayors and Sheriffs.
- The political songs of England, from the reign of John to that of Edward II (1884). Ed. and tr. by Thomas Wright ... and revised by Edmund Goldsmid.

English literature 1. Collections of translations of Anglo-Saxon and Middle English works of fiction and poetry.

- Select translations from Old English prose, edited by Albert S. Cook and Chauncey B. Tinker.
- The Cambridge book of prose and verse in illustration of English literature; from the beginnings to the cycles of romance (1924). Edited by George Sampson.
- Early English poems (1910). Selected and in part translated by Henry S. Pancoast and John Duncan Spaeth.
- English literature from Widsith to the death of Chaucer: a source book (1916). By Allen Rogers Benham. From Widsith to Chaucer.
- English literature: the beginnings to 1500 (1929). Edited by James Dow McCallum.
- A mediæval anthology, being lyrics and other short poems, chiefly religious (1915). Collected and modernized by Mary G. Segar.
- Old English and medieval literature (1929). Selected and edited by Gordon Hall Gerould. Selections from Beowulf, Cynewulf, Vision of Piers Plowman (Version A), The Pearl, and Malory's Morte d'Arthur.
- A Treasury of English literature: from the beginning to the eighteenth century (1906). Selected and arranged with translations and glossaries by Kate M. Warren with an introduction by Stopford A. Brooke.
- Anglo-Saxon and Norse poems (1922). Edited and translated by Nora Kershaw Chadwick. Including: Wanderer, Seafarer, Wife's complaint, Husband's message, Ruin, and Battle of Brunanburh.
- The Anglo-Saxon charms (1909). By Felix Grendon.
- Anglo-Saxon poetry (1926). Selected and translated by Prof. Robert Kay Gordon.
- Be domes dæge, De die judicii; an Old English version of the Latin poem ascribed to Bede (1876). Edited (with other short poems) from the unique ms. in the library of Corpus Christi College, Cambridge, by J. Rawson Lumby. A poem ascribed to the Venerable Bede.
- Elene; Judith; Athelstan, or, The fight at Brunanburh; and Byrhtnoth, or The fight at Maldon: Anglo-Saxon poems (1889). Translated by James M. Garnett. Poems including: Cynewulf's Elene and Judith; Æthelstan at the Battle of Brunanburh; and Byrhtnoth at the Battle of Maldon.
- Illustrations of Anglo-Saxon poetry (1826). By John Josias Conybeare. Edited, together with additional notes, introductory notices, etc., by his brother William Daniel Conybeare.
- Judith, Phœnix, and other Anglo-Saxon poems (1902). Translated from the Grein-Wülker text by John Lesslie Hall. Includes Cynewulf's Judith and the Phoenix; Battle of Maldon; Battle of Brunanburh; and Andreas, which tells the story of St. Andrew the Apostle,

Epic tales

- Epic and saga (1910). Includes: (1) Beowulf, translated by Frances Barton Gummere (1855–1919); The songs of Roland, translated by John O'Hagan The destruction of Dá Derga's hostel, translated by Whitley Stokes (1830–1909); The story of the Volsungs and Niblungs, translated by Eiríkr Magnússon (1833–1913) and William Morris (1834–1896); Songs from The Elder Edda, translated by Eiríkr Magnússon and William Morris. With introductions and notes. Harvard classics 49.
- The ancient Irish epic tale Táin bó Cúalnge: The Cualnge cattle-raid (1914). A translation of Táin bó Cúailnge, considered Ireland's national epic. Now for the first time done entire into English out of the Irish of the Book of Leinster and allied manuscripts by Joseph Dunn (1872–1951), with two pages in facsimilé of the manuscripts. The story was paraphrased by Mary A. Drummond Hutton in The Táin (1924).

Eric the Red. See Eiríks saga rauða.

Exeter Book. Exeter Book

- The Exeter book (1895). An anthology of Anglo-Saxon poetry presented to Exeter Cathedral by Loefric, first bishop of Exeter (1050-1071), and still in possession of the dean and chapter. Edited from the manuscript, with a translation, notes, introduction, etc., by English historian and Shakespearian scholar Sir Israel Gollancz (1863–1930). In Early English Text Society, Original series, Volume 104, 194.

== See also ==
- Annals
- Arabic literature
- Islamic literature
- Medieval literature
