= List of Portuguese films of the 1920s =

A list of films produced in the Cinema of Portugal ordered by year of release in the 1920s. For an alphabetical list of Portuguese films see Category:Portuguese films

== 1920s ==
| Title | Director | Cast | Genre | Notes |
|---|---|---|---|---|
1923
| A Sereia de Pedra | Roger Lion | Maria Emília Castelo Branco, Gil Clary, Max Maxudian | Drama | Shown widely in Brazil also. |
1929
| Aspectos de Aveiro | | | | |
