= Battle of Winchelsea =

1350 naval battle of the Hundred Years' War

- Part of the Hundred Years' War
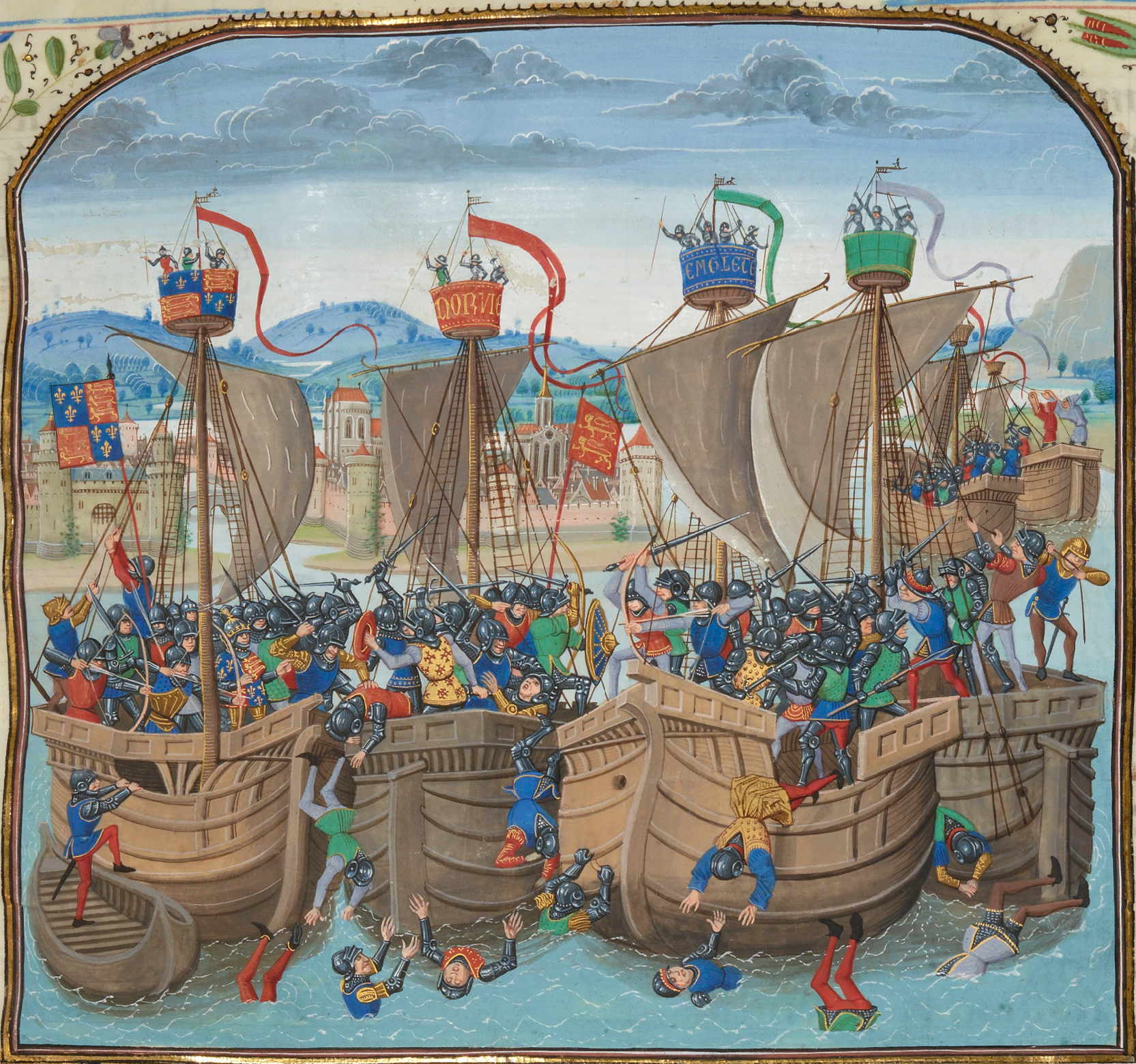
- A depiction of medieval naval combat from Jean Froissart's Chronicles, 14th century
Date	29 August 1350
Location	Southern coast of England, off Winchelsea 50.88°N 0.81°E
Result	English victory

Belligerents
Kingdom of England	Crown of Castile

Commanders and leaders
King Edward III; Edward the Black Prince	Charles de la Cerda

Strength
50 ships	47 ships

Casualties and losses
At least 2 ships lost Heavy human losses	14–26 ships captured

The Battle of Winchelsea or the Battle of Les Espagnols sur Mer ("the Spaniards on the Sea") was a naval battle that took place on 29 August 1350 as part of the Hundred Years' War between England and France. It was a victory for an English fleet of 50 ships, commanded by King Edward III, over a Castilian fleet of 47 larger vessels, commanded by Charles de la Cerda. Between 14 and 26 Castilian ships were captured, and several were sunk. Only two English vessels are known to have been sunk, but there was a significant loss of life.

England's trade, its war finance and its ability to bring force to bear against France were heavily reliant on seaborne transportation, especially to its territory in Gascony. With their own ability to raise and support a fleet much reduced by English activities, the French hired Castilian ships to blockade English ports. Frustrated by their effectiveness, Edward III led the fleet that intercepted them and inflicted heavy losses. In spite of that success, English trade and ports saw little relief from naval harassment by the French and their allies.

== Background ==
Since the Norman Conquest of 1066, English monarchs had held titles and lands within France, the possession of which made them vassals of the kings of France. Over the centuries, English holdings in France had varied in size, but by 1337 only Gascony in south-western France and Ponthieu in northern France were left. Following a series of disagreements between Philip VI of France and Edward III of England, on 24 May Philip's Great Council in Paris agreed that the Duchy of Aquitaine, effectively Gascony, should be taken back into Philip's hands on the grounds that Edward was in breach of his obligations as a vassal. This marked the start of the Hundred Years' War, which was to last one hundred and sixteen years.

Throughout the early part of the war English coastal areas were harassed by French raids. The port towns of Portsmouth, Southampton, Hastings and Plymouth were captured and razed, as were many smaller places. Numerous English merchant ships, and several warships, were captured. In June 1340 Edward III smashed the French fleet at the Battle of Sluys. In 1346 the English landed in northern Normandy and undertook a devastating chevauchée through northern France. The English navy paralleled the march of the army, capturing or burning large numbers of French warships and merchant vessels as it went. Thereafter the threat from the French navy was much reduced. The English then soundly beat the French at the Battle of Crécy and captured the major French port city of Calais. The Truce of Calais was agreed in September 1347 but the war continued via raids and guerrilla warfare; the ongoing fighting was "almost constant".

When war did not restrict trade, over 1,000 ships a year departed Gascony for England. Among their cargo were over 100,000,000 litres of wine. The duty levied by the crown on wine from Bordeaux was more than all other customs duties combined and by far the largest source of state income. Bordeaux, the capital of Gascony, was larger than London, and possibly richer. However, by this time English Gascony had become so truncated by French encroachments that it relied on imports of food, largely from England. Any interruptions to regular shipping were liable to starve Gascony and financially cripple England; the French were well aware of this.

== Prelude ==
England, France and Gascony at the start of the Hundred Years' War

In November 1349, Charles de la Cerda, a soldier of fortune, son of Luis de la Cerda, and member of a branch of the Castilian royal family, sailed from northern Spain, commissioned by the French, with an unknown number of ships. He intercepted and captured several English ships laden with wine from Bordeaux and murdered their crews. Later in the year de la Cerda led a Castilian fleet of 47 ships loaded with Spanish wool from Corunna to Sluys, in Flanders, where it wintered. On the way he captured several more English ships, again murdering the crews – by throwing them overboard.

In early 1350 negotiations to renew the truce, brokered by two papal nuncios, were taking place. Nevertheless, the governments of both France and England were actively planning for the renewal of large scale military operations. In February, French intermediaries in Bruges paid 20,000 florins to hire the Castilian fleet as mercenaries. In April it blockaded the English Channel ports, while the French struggled to reinforce it with what native ships they could finance and man. In mid-June, a truce was agreed. The Castilians were specifically named in it, and Phillip VI ceased to pay them.

Regardless, the Castilian ships continued to attack the English, now as outright pirates. They had converted their vessels into warships by the addition of wooden castles – raised fighting platforms – at the bow and stern and the erection of crow's nest fighting platforms at the masthead. They were based out of Sluys, and several hundred Flemish adventurers joined their ranks, mostly equipped as crossbowmen, in the expectation of plunder. Their assault on English shipping has been described as "ferocious", and as bringing "panic" to English ports. The English arrayed the coastguard for the first time since the Normandy campaign in 1346.

On 10 August, while Edward was at Rotherhithe, he announced his intention of confronting the Castilians. The English fleet was to rendezvous at Sandwich, Kent. Edward had good sources of intelligence in Flanders and knew the composition of De la Cerda's fleet and when it sailed. He determined to intercept it and sailed from Sandwich on 28 August with 50 ships, (Note: This strength is not known with certainty, but Stow puts it at 50 ships and pinnaces.(Hannay 1911, p. 711)) all smaller than the majority of the Castilian vessels and some much smaller. Edward and many of the highest nobility of England, including two of Edward's sons, sailed with the fleet, which was well provided with men-at-arms and archers.

== Battle ==
By the afternoon of 29 August, the English fleet was off Dungeness. Edward was sitting on the deck of his ship, with his knights and nobles, listening to his minstrels playing German airs, and to the singing of young John Chandos. (Note: Later the knight banneret Sir John Chandos.(Hannay 1911, p. 712)) At 4:00 pm they sighted de la Cerda's force moving towards them with an easterly wind behind. The Castilians had become scattered and the English targeted their main body of approximately twenty-four vessels. When the look-outs in the tops reported the enemy in sight, Edward and his company drank to one another's health, the trumpet was sounded, and the whole line stood out. There being no effective naval artillery at the time, battles at sea consisted of grappling with and boarding enemy vessels. To ensure that the Castilians did not sweep past them on the wind, the English also ran before the wind, but with shortened sails so as to allow themselves to be overtaken. There seems to have been an hour before the fighting commenced.

The difficulty of the manoeuvre is attested to by the King's own ship, the Cog Thomas, striking the Castilian it was attempting to grapple so heavily as to spring the English ship's timbers. At the second attempt, it successfully grappled and archers deterred Castilians attempting to drop large rocks from their higher deck. The Castilian ships towered above the diminutive English ones; "like castles to cottages" as a contemporary wrote. Using scaling ladders the English men-at-arms boarded the Castilian ship and cleared its deck. Edward transferred his flag, as Cog Thomas was clearly sinking. His son, Edward Prince of Wales, had a similar experience, his men reportedly barely fighting their way aboard their opponent before their own ship foundered. Their assault was aided by Henry of Lancaster attacking from the other side.

This encouraged the prince's party, and presently the Spaniard surrendered. Her entire crew was, nevertheless, as was the custom in that age, and long afterwards, flung overboard. The prince and his followers had barely time to crowd into the prize before their own craft foundered.

La Cerda's crossbowmen caused many English casualties, firing from their elevated positions as the English closed and then attempted to board. The higher-built and heavier Castilian vessels were able to drop bars of iron or other weights on the lighter English vessels, causing serious damage. The conflict continued until twilight. At the close, the English vessel La Salle du Roi, carrying the king's household, and commanded by the Fleming Robert of Namur, (Note: Afterwards a knight of the Garter (Hannay 1911, p. 712).) was grappled by a larger Castilian and was being dragged off. A Flemish valet of Robert's, named Hannequin, boarded the enemy and cut the halliards of her mainsail with his sword, allowing other English ships to catch the Castilian, and it was taken.

The English are said to have captured between 14 and 26 of the enemy ships and it is possible that others were sunk. (Note: Avesbury put the number at 24, Walsingham at 26, not including those that were sunk.) What their own losses were is not stated but, as Edward's own vessel and the vessel carrying the Black Prince were sunk, and from the near capture of La Salle du Roi, it seems likely that the English fleet suffered heavily. Few, if any, prisoners were taken, and dead and wounded Castilians and Flemings were thrown overboard. Much of this action was visible from the English shore, and the clifftops near Winchelsea were lined with spectators, which gave the battle its name.

== Aftermath ==
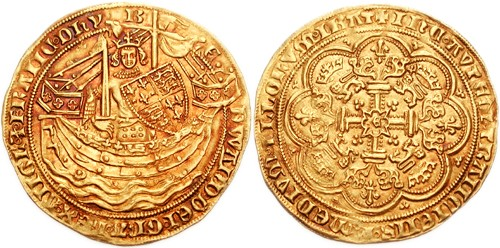
A gold noble coin of 1354, the obverse showing Edward III seated in a cog, figuratively "ruling the seas"

There was no pursuit of the surviving Castilian ships, which fled to French ports. Joined by French ships, they continued to harass English shipping for the rest of the autumn before withdrawing to Sluys again to winter. The following spring, the Channel was still effectively closed to English shipping unless strongly escorted. Trade with Gascony was less affected, but ships were forced to use ports in western England, often impractically far from their cargo's intended English markets. Chroniclers make much of this victory, no doubt because of the royal involvement. However, historians point out the heavy English loss of personnel and the likelihood that a number of their ships were lost. Others have suggested that the battle was just one of a number of significant and hard-fought naval encounters of the period, only recorded because of the prominent figures involved. Most stress its lack of impact on the operational or strategic situation.

Charles de la Cerda survived the battle and shortly after was made Constable of France. With communications with Gascony now more secure, the English launched a large expedition from there in 1356 under the Prince of Wales, at the end of which the French suffered a devastating defeat. Edward III continued the war, bringing it to a successful conclusion in 1360 with the Treaty of Brétigny.

== Sources ==
The main contemporaneous account for the battle is Jean Froissart, who was at different times in the service of Edward and of his wife, Philippa of Hainault, and of the counts of Namur. He repeated what was told to him by men who had been present, and dwells as usual on the chivalry of his patrons. However, there are also records from chroniclers Thomas Walsingham and Robert of Avesbury, and later John Stow. Sir Nicholas Nicolas was the first modern historian to tackle this episode in naval history.

== General and cited references ==
- Avesbury, Robert of (1889). "De Gesta mirabilibus Regis Edwardi Tertii". In Murimuth, Adam; Thompson, Edward Maunde (eds.). Chronicles and memorials of Great Britain and Ireland during the Middle Ages. Vol. 1. London: Longman, Brown, Green, Londmans and Roberts. OCLC 492928484.
- Burne, Alfred (1999). The Crecy War. Ware, Hertfordshire: Wordsworth Editions. ISBN 978-1-84022-210-4.
- Clowes, William Laird (1996) [1897]. The Royal Navy: A History From The Earliest Times to 1900. Vol. 1. London: Chatham publishing. ISBN 978-1-86176-015-9.
- Farmer, Sharon (2016). The Silk Industries of Medieval Paris. Philadelphia: University of Pennsylvania Press. ISBN 978-0-8122-9331-9.
- Froissart, Jean (1870). Luce, Simeon (ed.). Chroniques. Vol. 1. Paris: Societe de la Histoire de France. LCCN 05009768.
- Hannay, David (1911). "Espagnols sur Mer, Les" . In Chisholm, Hugh (ed.). Encyclopædia Britannica. Vol. 25 (11th ed.). Cambridge: Cambridge University Press. p. 246. OCLC 14004298
- Harris, Robin (1994). Valois Guyenne. Royal Historical Society Studies in History. Vol. 71. Woodbridge, Suffolk: Boydell Press. ISBN 978-0-86193-226-9.
- Oman, Charles (1998) [1924]. A History of the Art of War in the Middle Ages: 1278–1485 A.D. London: Greenhill Books. ISBN 978-1-85367-332-0.
- Prestwich, M. (2007). J.M. Roberts (ed.). Plantagenet England 1225–1360. Oxford: Oxford University Press. ISBN 978-0-19-922687-0.
- Rodger, N.A.M. (2004). The Safeguard of the Sea. London: Penguin. ISBN 978-0-14-029724-9.
- Sumption, Jonathan (1990). Trial by Battle. London: Faber and Faber. ISBN 978-0-571-20095-5.
- Sumption, Jonathan (1999). Trial by Fire. London: Faber and Faber. ISBN 978-0-571-13896-8.
