= Elisabeth of Schönau =

German Benedictine visionary

Saint Elisabeth of Schönau
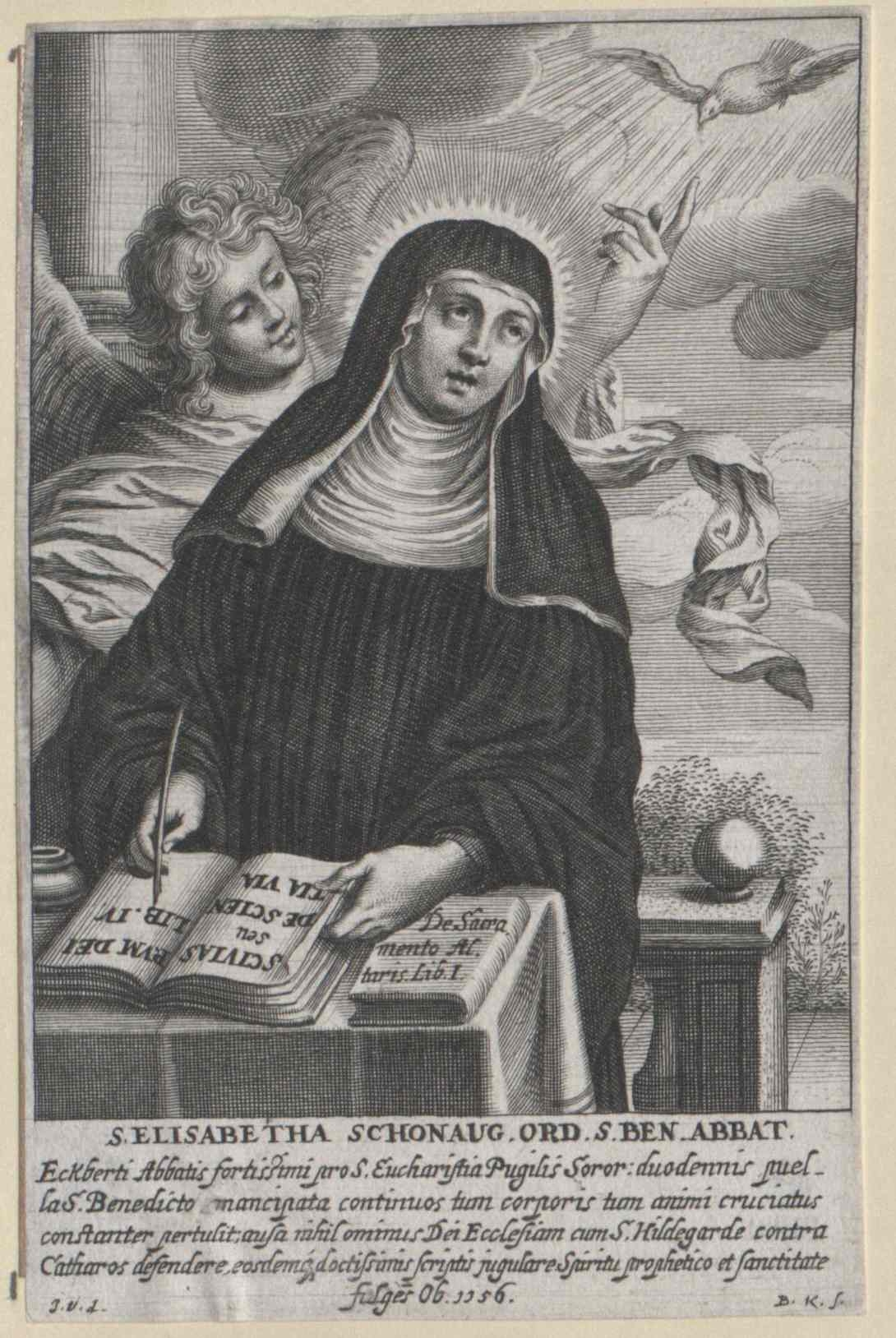
- Depiction of Elisabeth in a manuscript at the Austrian National Library
- Born: c. 1129; Germany
- Died: 18 June 1164 (aged 34–35); Schönau Abbey, Strüth, Germany
- Venerated in: Roman Catholic Church
- Feast: 18 June
- Patronage: Schönau, Germany

Elisabeth of Schönau (c. 1129 – 18 June 1164) was a German Benedictine visionary. (Note: When her writings were published, the title of "Saint" was added to her name. She was never canonised, but in 1584 her name was entered in the Roman Martyrology and has remained there. Her feast day is 18 June.) She was an abbess at the Schönau Abbey in the Duchy of Nassau, and reportedly experienced numerous religious visions, for which she became widely sought after by many powerful men as far away as France and England.

== Life ==
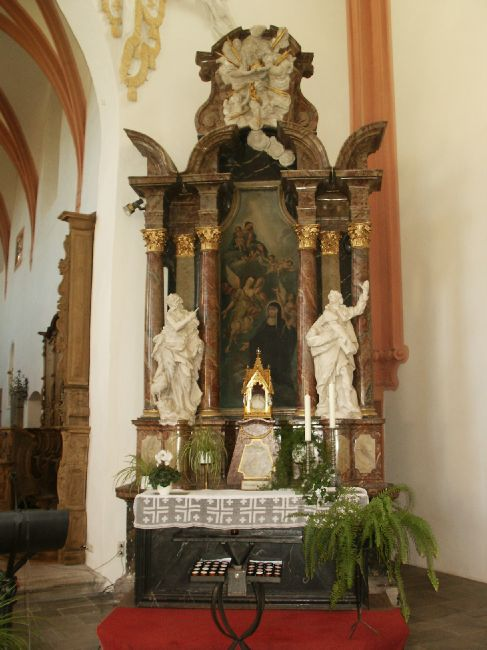
Altar of St. Elisabeth of Schönau (with the reliquary in which Elisabeth's skull is kept) in the monastery church of St. Florin, Kloster Schönau im Taunus

Elisabeth was born about 1129, of family named Hartwig of the Middle Rhine. She was educated at the double monastery of Schönau in Nassau and made her profession as a Benedictine in 1147. In 1157 she became abbess of the nuns under the supervision of Abbot Hildelin. F.W.E. Roth points out that in the 12th century only women of noble birth were promoted to spiritual offices in the Benedictine order; it seems probable that Elisabeth was of noble birth.

Her hagiography describes her as given to works of piety from her youth, much afflicted with bodily and mental suffering, a zealous observer of the Rule of Saint Benedict and of the regulation of her convent, and devoted to practices of mortification. In the years 1147 to 1152 Elisabeth suffered recurrent disease, anxiety and depression as a result of her strict asceticism. Hildegard of Bingen admonished Elisabeth in letters to be prudent in the ascetic life.

In 1152, Elisabeth began to experience ecstatic visions of various kinds. This was "a year after Hildegard of Bingen published her first book of visions, the Scivias, a work which seems to have influenced Elisabeth." These visions generally occurred on Sundays and Holy Days at Mass or Divine Office or after hearing or reading the lives of saints. Christ, the Virgin Mary, an angel, or the special saint of the day would appear to her and instruct her; or she would see quite realistic representations of the Passion, Resurrection, and Ascension, or other scenes of the Old and New Testaments.

She died on 18 June 1164 and was buried in the abbey church of St. Florin.

== Works ==
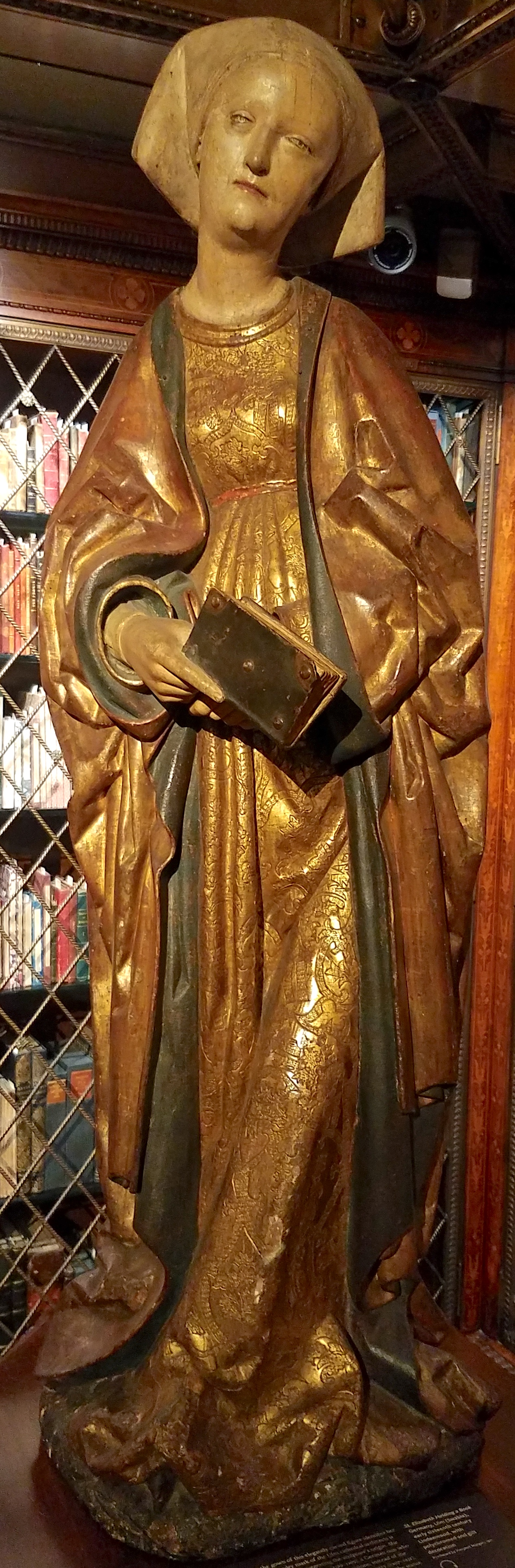
Statue likely representing Saint Elisabeth of Schönau, German, 16th century (Morgan Library and Museum, New York City)

What Elisabeth saw and heard she put down on wax tablets. Her abbot, Hildelin, told her to relate these things to her brother Eckebert, then a cleric at Saint Cassius in Bonn, who acted as an editor. At first she hesitated fearing lest she be deceived or be looked upon as a deceiver; but she obeyed. Eckebert (who became a monk of Schönau in 1155 and eventually succeeded Hildelin as second abbot) put everything in writing, later arranged the material at leisure, and then published all under his sister's name. While this relationship between brother and sister allowed for Elisabeth's wide broadcasting of her visionary experiences, it is evident that Eckebert attempted to have a degree of authority over Elisabeth.

The events in the first book probably took place before Hildelin intervened and told her to write these things down, while the things in the later books may have been after this point in time and occurred when Elisabeth had already begun writing.

Thus came into existence three books of "Visions". Of these, the first is written in very simple language and an unaffected style. The other two are more elaborate and replete with theological terminology, so that they show more of the work of Eckebert than of Elisabeth.

Elisabeth's works are found in the 195th volume of the Patrologia Latina. Aside from her Books of Visions, her works include:

=== Liber revelationum Elisabeth de sacro exercitu virginum Coloniensium ===
In 1106, an old Roman cemetery was discovered outside Cologne, and was believed to contain the remains of Ursula and her eleven thousand legendary companions. The discovery that the cemetery contained the bodies of men and children, as well as various inscriptions on the headstones, raised questions about inconsistencies with the story of St. Ursula as laid out in the well-known Regnante domino. In the hope of resolving these questions, the abbot Gerlach von Deutz asked Elisabeth to consult her visions about the provenance of the bodies. Over the course of the following year, Elisabeth set down a series of interviews with various saints and angels, which were then compiled into the Liber revelationum Elisabeth de sacro exercitu virginum Coloniensium, or Book of Revelations on the Company of the Martyrs of Cologne.

These accounts, which the Catholic Encyclopedia describes as "full of fantastic exaggerations and anachronisms", have become the foundation of the subsequent Ursula legends. In her account, Elisabeth identifies one of the bodies as belonging to a "Pope Cyriacus", supposedly holding the office between Pope Pontian and Pope Anterus. Others are identified as Saint Verena and as the fiancé of St. Ursula.

=== Visio de resurrectione beate virginis Mariae ===
The Visio de resurrectione beate virginis Mariae, or The Resurrection of the Blessed Virgin, contains Elisabeth's revelations about the Virgin Mary.

On one occasion of religious frustration and fear, she wrote down an experience she supposedly had at a mass on a Saturday when the Blessed Virgin was being celebrated, when she saw in the heavens "an image of a regal woman, standing on high, clothed in white vestments and wrapped with a purple mantle". The lady then eventually came closer to Elisabeth and blessed her with the sign of the cross, and reassured her that she would not be harmed by the things she had been frightened of. After receiving communion at the mass, she then went into an ecstatic trance and had another vision, declaring "I saw my Lady standing beside the altar, in a garment like a priestly chasuble and she had on her head a glorious crown". In her third text, she has Mary acting as an intercessor to hold back the anger of her Son from punishing the world in His anger for sin.

=== Liber viarum dei ===
The Liber viarum dei (Book of the Ways of God) seems to be an imitation of the Scivias (scire vias Domini) of Hildegarde of Bingen, her friend and correspondent. It contains admonitions to all classes of society, to the clergy and laity, to the married and unmarried. Here the influence of Eckebert is plain. She utters prophetic threats of judgment against priests who are unfaithful shepherds of the flock of Christ, against the avarice and worldliness of the monks who only wear the garb of poverty and self-denial, against the vices of the laity, and against bishops and superiors delinquent in their duty; she urges all to combat earnestly the heresy of the Cathari; she declares Victor IV, the antipope supported by Holy Roman Emperor Frederick I against Pope Alexander III, as the one chosen of God. All of this appears in Eckebert's own writings.

== Eckebert's role in managing Elisabeth's visions ==
Oftentimes Eckebert felt that it was necessary to further investigate the meaning of Elisabeth's visions, rather than to simply record her words. He frequently asked her to relay theological questions to the saints and angels she saw in her visions. Elisabeth had a vision in which she saw the virgin emerging with the sun surrounding her on all sides, and the virgin's great brilliance seemed to illuminate the entire earth. Along with the great brilliance which emanated from the virgin, a dark cloud appeared, which Elisabeth described as "extremely dark and horrible to see". Elisabeth asked the holy Angel of God, who often appeared to her during visions, what the latter vision meant. The Angel said that the virgin in the vision she saw is the humanity of the Lord Jesus. The Angel went on to explain that the darkness represents God's anger with the world, but that the brightness signifies that he has not altogether stopped watching over the earth. As ordered by Abbot Hildelin, Elisabeth revealed her vision to Eckebert.

Eckebert was struck with confusion after hearing this vision; he could not understand the purpose of the Lord's humanity being represented by a virgin instead of a man. Elisabeth relayed the answer provided to her by the Angel, explaining that "the humanity of Christ was symbolized by a female figure so that the symbol could also refer to the Virgin Mary". However, Elisabeth did not waiver from her initial explanation of her vision. In the end, Eckebert does choose to publish this vision, and includes that the Lord the Savior's humanity is represented by a virgin. This incident represents Eckebert's strong belief in the reality of his sister's visionary experiences.

There is a great diversity of opinion in regard to her revelations. The church has never passed any ruling on them nor even examined them. Elizabeth herself was convinced of their supernatural character, as she states in a letter to Hildegarde; her brother held the same opinion. Johannes Trithemius considers them genuine; Eusebius Amort (De revelationibus visionibus et apparitionibus privatis regulae tutae, etc., Augsburg, 1744) holds them to be nothing more than Elizabeth's own imagination, or illusions of the devil, since in some things they disagree with history and with other revelations (Acta SS., Oct, IX, 81). In 1884, F.W.E. Roth published a treatise on Elisabeth of Schönau, Die Visionen der Heilage Elisabeth von Schönau. Although a great admirer of Elizabeth, Roth does not believe in her visions as divine revelation. He considers her a susceptible individual, living in a cloistered environment under a strict rule, and focus on prayer and contemplation developed into fanatical devotion.

== Veneration ==
Because the population soon venerated Elisabeth as a saint, her bones were reburied between 1420 and 1430 in a special chapel; the chapel was destroyed in the great fire of the Schönau Abbey in 1723 and not rebuilt.

During the Thirty Years' War, Swedish and Hessian soldiers attacked Schönau Monastery. The Swedes expelled the monks, plundered the monastery, broke into the grave of Elisabeth and scattered her bones; only the skull was saved. It is now preserved in a reliquary on the right side of the altar of the church.

The parish of St. Florin Schönau Monastery annually celebrates the traditional Elisabethen-Fest on the Sunday after 18 June.

== Reputation ==
Elisabeth's popularity is evident considering those who called upon her for advice. The number of men who were very learned and religious who asked for letters from Elisabeth is astonishing. One monk, from an abbey in Busendorf, came to meet with Elisabeth in order to be provided with a deeper understanding of Elisabeth's visions, and in an effort to comprehend what God was doing with this woman. Upon leaving, he asked Elisabeth if he might be worthy enough to receive a letter from her. Elisabeth fulfilled his request and wrote the abbot of Busendorf a letter that provided him and his monks with spiritual advice through the grace of God. The letter emphasized the importance of the abbot's responsibility over his monks and the guidance the abbot must extend to his monks. Elisabeth states the importance of living one's life for God and of not getting sidetracked by worldly affairs.

Elisabeth wrote to powerful men when they did not ask for it, as well. Elisabeth scolded the archbishop, Hillin, of the city of Trier for not telling her divine message of condemnation to the people of Rome. She commanded that he, "Rise up in the spirit of humility and fear of the Lord your God." Throughout the letter it is evident that Elisabeth's Angel has spoken to her, and she is relaying this message to the archbishop. The letter is filled with anger and shows great disappointment in the archbishop of Trier, for God has taken notice of his failure to carry out his episcopal duties. Elisabeth informs him that if he does not tell the people of Rome the divine message in which Elisabeth has revealed to him, he will suffer on the final judgment day. Again, as in her letter to the abbot of Busendorf, her authority and belief in herself of a vessel of God is evident, and she has clearly gone above and beyond the limits of the traditional female gender role.

== Translations ==
- Critical Edition (Latin): Ferdinand Wilhelm Emil Roth, ed. (Brunn, 1884)
- Modern English Translation: Elisabeth of Schönau: the complete works, Anne L. Clark, trans. and intro., Barbara J. Newman, preface (New York: Paulist Press, 2000)
- Modern German translation: Die Werke der Heiligen Elisabeth von Schönau, Peter Dinzelbacher, trans. (Verlag Ferdinand Schöningh, 2006) ISBN 3-506-72937-3
- Translations have been published in modern Italian (Venice, 1859) and French (Tournai, 1864), as well as medieval Icelandic (ca. 1226–1254)

== See also ==
- Catholic Church in Germany
- List of Catholic saints
- Saint Elisabeth of Schönau, patron saint archive

== Sources ==
- Butler, Lives of the Saints
- Streber in Kirchenlex., s.v.
- Hauck, Kirchengesch. Deutsche., IV, 244 sqq.
- Wilhelm Preger, Geschichte der deutschen Mystik im Mittelalter (1874–93), 1, 37
- Acta Sanctorum, June, IV, 499
- Roth, Das Gebetbuch der Elisabeth von Schönau (1886)
- Franz Xaver Kraus: Elisabeth, die Heilige, von Schönau. In: Allgemeine Deutsche Biographie (ADB). Volume 6, Duncker & Humblot, Leipzig 1877, S. 46 f.
- Kurt Köster: Elisabeth von Schönau. In: Neue Deutsche Biographie (NDB). Volume 4, Duncker & Humblot, Berlin 1959, S. 452 f.
- Friedrich Wilhelm Bautz (1975). "Elisabeth von Schönau". In Bautz, Friedrich Wilhelm (ed.). Biographisch-Bibliographisches Kirchenlexikon (BBKL) (in German). Vol. 1. Hamm: Bautz. cols. 1497–1498. ISBN 3-88309-013-1.
- Peter Dinzelbacher: Mittelalterliche Frauenmystik. (Schöningh: Paderborn, 1993)
- Joachim Kemper: Das benediktinische Doppelkloster Schönau und die Visionen der hl. Elisabeth von Schönau, in: Archiv für mittelrheinische Kirchengeschichte 54/2002 S. 55-102
