= Schönau Abbey =

Schönau Abbey may refer to:

- Schönau Abbey (Nassau), Benedictine monastery founded in 1126
- Schönau Abbey (Odenwald), Cistercian monastery founded in 1142
- Schönau Abbey (Gemünden am Main), Cistercian nunnery founded in 1189

== See also ==
- Frauenchiemsee, called Schönau in the 9th century
