= Schönau Abbey (Nassau) =

Monastery in Germany

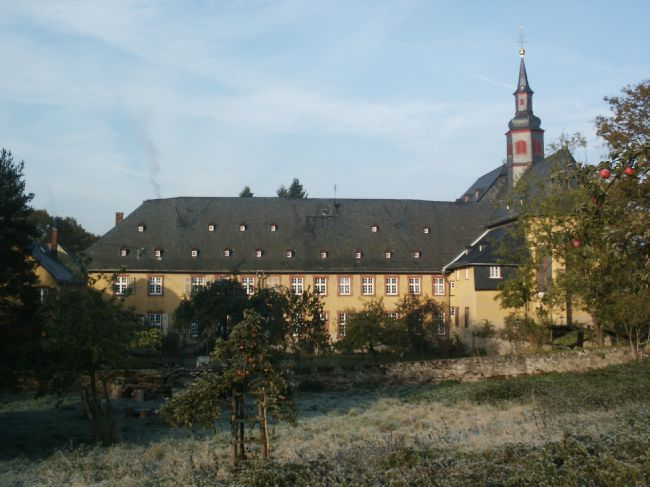
- Schönau Abbey of Nassau
- Interactive map of Schönau Abbey

Monastery information
- Full name: Kloster Schönau
- Order: Benedictine
- Established: 1126
- Disestablished: Convent: 1606, Monk's monastery: 1802
- Mother house: Schaffhausen Abbey
- Diocese: Diocese of Limburg
- Controlled churches: Parish of St. Florin

People
- Founder: Rupert I, Count of Laurenburg
- Important associated figures: St. Elizabeth of Schönau.

Site
- Location: Strüth, Rhineland-Palatinate, Germany
- Coordinates: 50°8′26″N 7°53′39″E

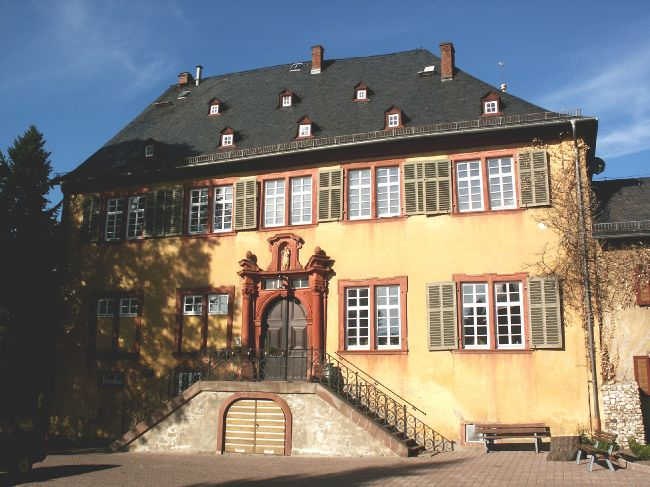
Rectory, Schönau Abbey of Nassau

Schönau Abbey is a monastery in the Roman Catholic Diocese of Limburg on the outskirts of the municipality of Strüth in the Rhein-Lahn district, Rhineland-Palatinate, Germany. It is often referred to as Schönau Abbey of Nassau (because it was founded by the House of Nassau and was located in their lands) or Schönau Abbey in Taunus, in order to differentiate it from the other Schönau Abbey in Baden-Württemberg. This Schönau Abbey is most well known as the convent of St. Elizabeth of Schönau.

== History ==
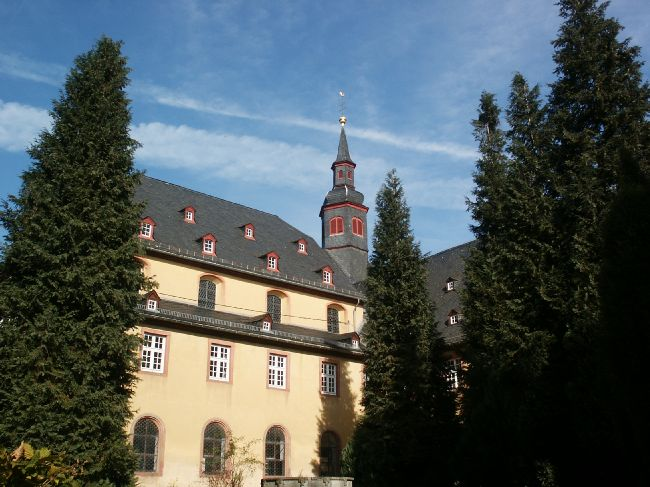
Abbey church of St. Florin, Schönau Abbey of Nassau

Around 1117, Dudo, Count of Laurenburg founded at Lipporn a Benedictine priory dedicated and named for Florin of Koblenz, and dependent on the Benedictine All Saints Abbey in Schaffhausen. About 1126, his son, Rupert I, Count of Laurenburg, the Vogt of Lipporn, established it as a separate and independent abbey. The Romanesque buildings were constructed between 1126 and 1145, presumably with a three-nave basilica. The abbey included both a monastery for monks and a small, separate one for nuns.

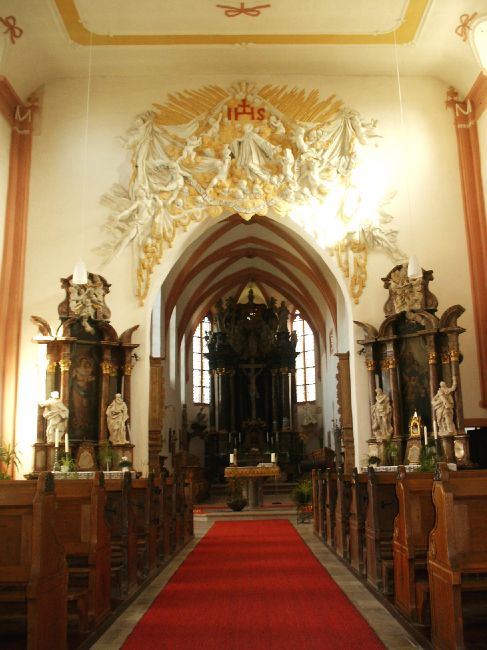
Abbey church of St. Florin, Schönau Abbey of Nassau

Hildelin, of noble birth, was the first abbot. The area was rude and uncultivated, and building proceeded slowly. Hildelin asked the Bishop of Trèves for assistance, and was given the nearby church of Welterode.

Elizabeth of Schönau worked there from 1141 until her death in 1164. Her brother Eckebert (died 1184) entered the men’s monastery at Schönau in 1155 or 1156.

Schönau Abbey had grown strong enough economically by 1340 that the city of Frankfurt am Main could promise support through arms and wagons. A Gothic chancel (still extant today) and a chapel dedicated to Saint Elizabeth were added between 1420 and 1430 on the north side of the nave.

During the Protestant Reformation, the surrounding communities of Strüth, Welterod, and Lipporn became Protestant between 1541 and 1544, but Schönau Abbey remained Catholic. In 1606, the convent was dissolved because only a few sisters still lived in Schönau.

During the Thirty Years War, Swedish and Hessian soldiers attacked Schönau Abbey between 1631 and 1635. The Swedes drove off the monks, plundered the monastery, broke into the grave of Elizabeth and scattered her bones. Only the skull was rescued. It is now preserved in a reliquary on the right-side altar of the church.

A major fire in 1723 destroyed the church and convent, and only the Gothic chancel remains extant today from the original buildings. The abbey received its present shape in reconstruction over the following years. The chapel to Elizabeth, however, was not rebuilt.

== Recent history ==
In the course of secularization in 1802 and 1803, the monks' community was dissolved and the monastery became the property of the state of Nassau. Some of the buildings were sold to private individuals. The parish previously affiliated with Schönau Abbey became part of the Vicariate General of Limburg an der Lahn, which would then become the Diocese of Limburg in 1827.

In 1904, the Dernbacher Sisters (officially, the Ancillae Domini Jesu Christi, the Poor Handmaids of Jesus Christ) moved into the monastery. From 1947 to 1975, displaced Premonstratensians from Teplá Abbey in Czechoslovakia also lived there. The last Dernbacher sisters left the monastery in 1986.

Since then the buildings have been used by the local Catholic parish of St. Florin. In 1994, the parish established the Schönauer Book Corner as a public library. Three years later, the former work buildings became "One World House, Schönau Abbey" a learning and meeting place for groups. Also in the rooms of the One World House, a computer training facility and an Internet café were opened in 2001.
