= A Sereia de Pedra =

1923 film

- Directed by: Roger Lion
- Written by: Alberto Jardin
- Based on: Obra de Demonio by Virginia de Castro e Almeida
- Produced by: Virginia de Castro e Almeida
- Cinematography: Marcel Bizot, Daniel Quintin
- Production company: Fortuna Films
- Distributed by: Companhia Cinematografica de Portugal (Portugal); Agence Générale Cinématographique (France)
- Release date: 1923
- Country: Portugal
- Language: Silent

A Sereia de Pedra, known as Sirène de Pierre in France, is a 1923 Portuguese and French silent drama film directed by Roger Lion. The film was based on a story by Virginia de Castro e Almeida.

The film premiered in Paris on 2 April 1923, and was also shown in Brazil.

== Cast ==
- Maria Emília Castelo Branco as Maria
- Gil Clary as Leonor
- Max Maxudian as Pedro the metal-smith / Convent keeper
- Arthur Duarte as Miguel Alves, the archeologist
- Nestor Lopes as Cláudio
- Francisco Sena as Fragoso, the eremit
- Manuel Grilo as António, the bullfighter
