= Miroir de l'âme pécheresse =

French religious poem

Miroir de l’âme pécheresse ("Mirror of the Sinful Soul") is a 1531 poem by Marguerite d'Angoulême. It was translated by the future Queen Elizabeth I in 1548 as A Godly Meditation of the Soul. In August 1533, the Faculty of Theology of the University of Paris censured the Paris edition of Marguerite de Navarre’s Miroir de l’âme pécheresse as doctrinally suspect or heretical; the faculty later retracted the censure after royal intervention.

== Theological Controversy and the 1533 Censure ==
The poem's theology has been described as Pauline-Augustinian and evangelical: its speaker presents the human soul as radically sinful and dependent on God's grace, with faith occupying a central place in the process of conversion. The poem is structured as a first-person monologue addressed largely to Christ. The sinful soul describes her relationship with him through a series of familial and marital figures—daughter, mother, sister, and wife—and interprets these relationships through biblical episodes, including the Prodigal Son, Miriam, and Hosea.

The poem's emphasis on grace, sin, faith, and dependence on Christ should not by itself be treated as a rejection of Catholic doctrine: these themes also belonged to Augustinian and medieval Catholic theology. Its distinctive features instead include the highly personal form of its address to Christ, its extensive use of biblical typology, and its presentation of theological reflection through the voice of a female author writing in French. The poem also contains a favorable treatment of the Virgin Mary, including references to her virginity, maternity, faith, and grace.

The first Paris edition, printed by Antoine Augereau in 1533, added two prose prayers translated from Sebald Heyden's Unum Christum mediatorem esse. The title of Heyden's work explicitly asserts that Christ is the one mediator. In August 1533, the Faculty of Theology of the University of Paris initially censured this edition, but later retracted its censure. The surviving evidence does not preserve a complete list of the propositions or passages that the faculty considered objectionable; consequently, the precise theological grounds of the censure remain uncertain.

== See also ==
- The Miroir or Glasse of the Synneful Soul
