= Marguerite de Navarre =

Queen of Navarre from 1527 to 1549

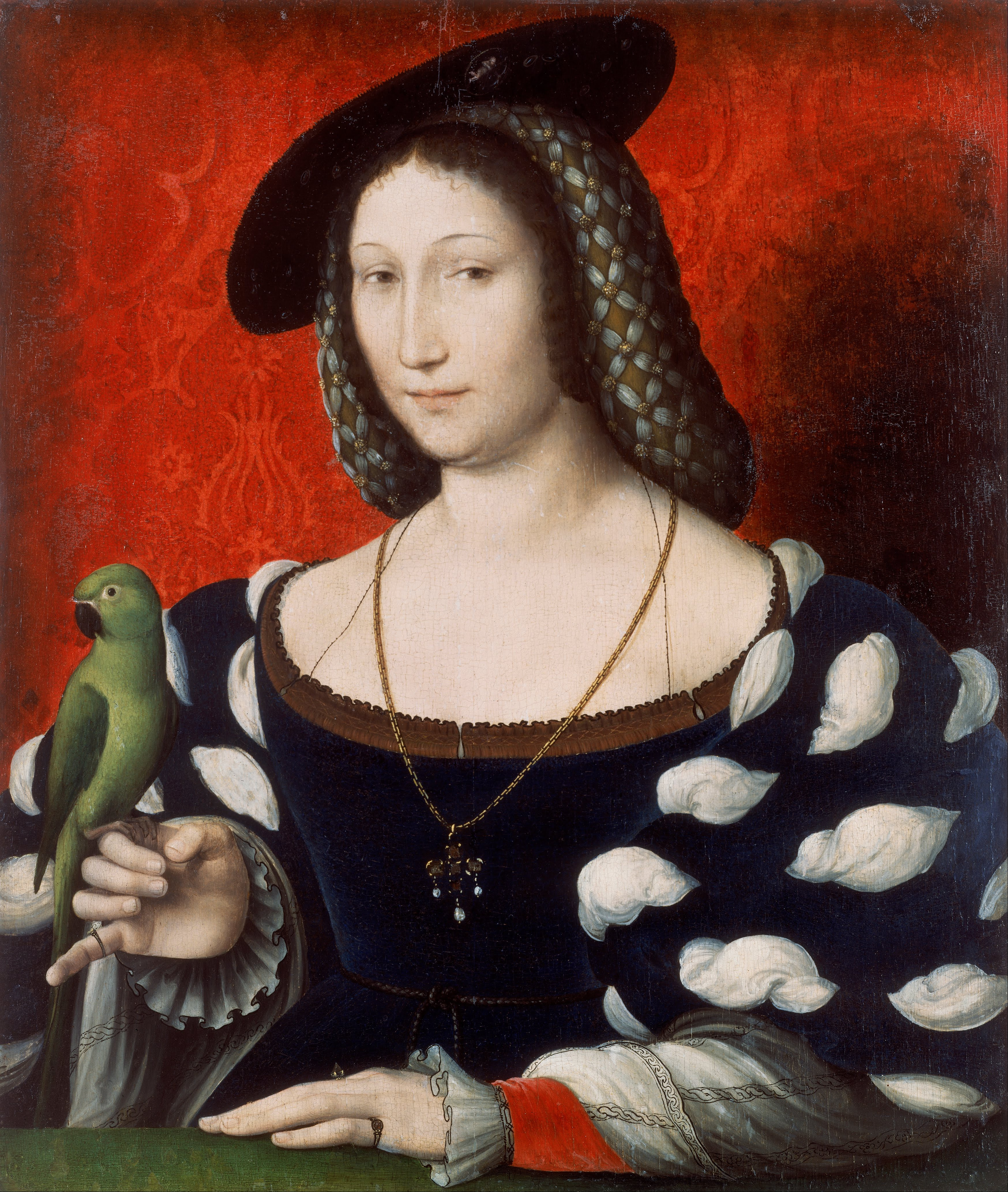
- Portrait attributed to Jean Clouet, c. 1527

Queen consort of Navarre
- Tenure: 24 January 1527 – 21 December 1549
- Born: 11 April 1492; Angoulême, Angoumois, France
- Died: 21 December 1549 (aged 57); Odos, Gascony, France
- Spouse: Charles IV, Duke of Alençon (m. 1509; died 1525) Henry II of Navarre (m. 1526)
- Issue more...: Jeanne III of Navarre
- House: Valois-Angoulême
- Father: Charles, Count of Angoulême
- Mother: Louise of Savoy
- Religion: Roman Catholicism
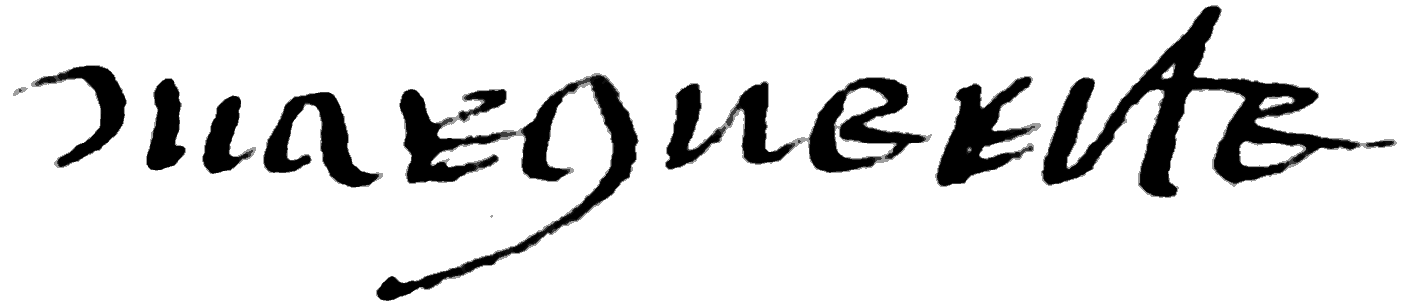
- Signature

Marguerite de Navarre (French: Marguerite d'Angoulême, Marguerite d'Alençon; 11 April 1492 – 21 December 1549), also known as Marguerite of Angoulême and Margaret of Navarre, was a princess of France, Duchess of Alençon and Berry, and Queen of Navarre by her second marriage to King Henry II of Navarre. Her brother became King of France, as Francis I, and the two siblings were responsible for the celebrated intellectual and cultural court and salons of their day in France. Marguerite is the ancestress of the Bourbon kings of France, being the mother of Jeanne d'Albret, whose son, Henry of Navarre, succeeded as Henry IV of France, the first Bourbon king. As an author and a patron of humanists and reformers, she was an outstanding figure of the French Renaissance. Samuel Putnam called her "The First Modern Woman".

== Early life ==
Marguerite was born in Angoulême on 11 April 1492, the eldest child of Louise of Savoy and Charles, Count of Angoulême. Her father was a descendant of Charles V, and would thus have been on the line of succession to the French crown by masculine primogeniture, if both Charles VIII and the presumptive heir, Louis, Duke of Orléans, had died without producing male offspring.

Two years after Marguerite's birth, the family moved from Angoulême to Cognac, "where the Italian influence reigned supreme, and where Boccaccio was looked upon as a little less than a god".

She had several half-siblings from illegitimate relationships of her father, who were raised alongside Marguerite and her brother Francis. Two girls, Jeanne of Angoulême and Madeleine, were born of her father's long relationship with his châtelaine, Antoinette de Polignac, Dame de Combronde, who later became Louise's lady-in-waiting and confidante. Another half-sister, Souveraine, was born to Jeanne le Conte, also one of her father's mistresses.

Thanks to her mother, who was only nineteen when widowed, Marguerite was carefully tutored from her earliest childhood and given a classical education that included Latin. The young princess was to be called "Maecenas to the learned ones of her brother's kingdom". When Marguerite was ten, Louise tried to marry her to the Prince of Wales, who would later become Henry VIII of England, but the alliance was courteously rebuffed. Perhaps the one real love in her life was Gaston de Foix, Duc de Nemours, nephew of King Louis XII. Gaston went to Italy, however, and died a hero at Ravenna, when the French defeated Spanish and Papal forces.

== First marriage ==
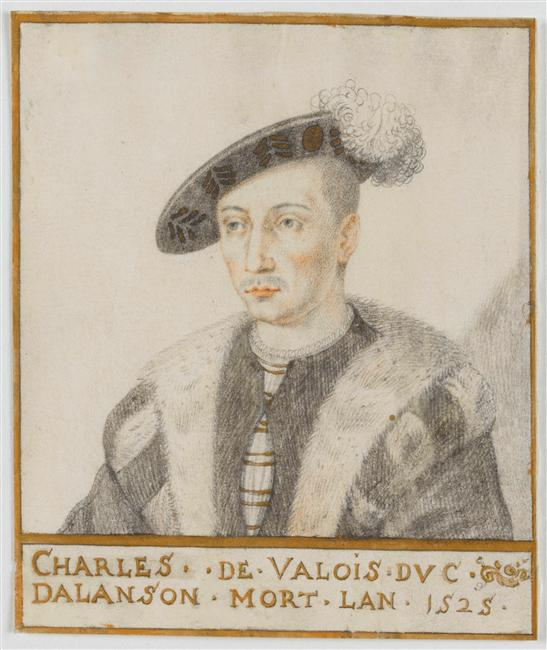
17th century portrait of Charles d'Alençon, Marguerite's first husband.

At the age of seventeen Marguerite was married to Charles IV of Alençon, aged twenty, by the decree of King Louis XII (who also arranged the marriage of his ten-year-old daughter, Claude, to Francis). With this decree, Marguerite was forced to marry a generally kind but practically illiterate man for political expediency—"the radiant young princess of the violet-blue eyes... had become the bride of a laggard and a dolt". She had been bartered to save the royal pride of Louis, by keeping the County of Armagnac in the family. There were no offspring from this marriage.

Following the example set by her mother, Marguerite became the most influential woman in France during her lifetime when her brother acceded to the crown as Francis I in 1515. Her salon, known as the "New Parnassus", became famous internationally.

After the death of Queen Claude, she took in her two nieces Madeleine and Marguerite, for whom she would continue to care during her second marriage.

== Issue ==
Coat of arms of Marquerite as Queen of Navarre

Marguerite was married twice, first to Charles IV of Alençon, but this marriage was childless.

Her next marriage was to Henry II of Navarre. The children of Marguerite and Henry were:

1. Jeanne III of Navarre (16 November 1528 – 9 June 1572), the mother of the future Henry IV of France, also known as Henry III of Navarre. She became Queen regnant of Navarre from 1555 to 1572. She was the wife of Antoine de Bourbon, Duke of Vendôme, and mother of Henry of Bourbon, who became King of Navarre and also of France as the first Bourbon king. She was the acknowledged spiritual and political leader of the French Huguenot movement.
2. Jean (7 July 1530 – 25 December 1530), who died as an infant

== Queen of Navarre ==
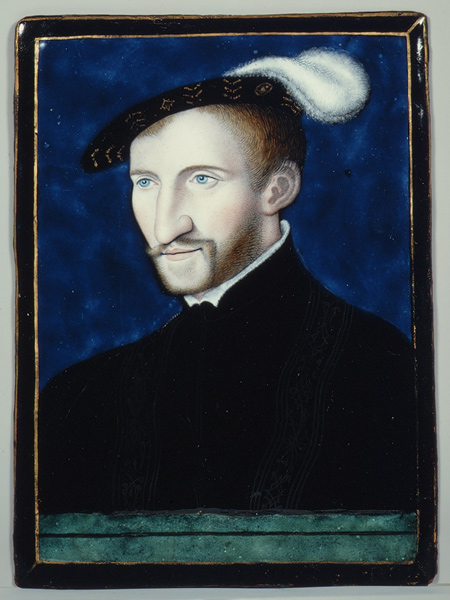
Henri d'Albret King of Navarre

After the death of her first husband in 1525, Marguerite married Henry II of Navarre in January 1527 at St. Germain-en-Laye. Ferdinand II of Aragon had invaded the Kingdom of Navarre in 1512, and Henry ruled only Lower Navarre, the independent principality of Béarn, and several dependencies in Gascony. Approximately a year after the lead image (in the information box) that was painted by Jean Clouet, on 16 November 1528, Marguerite gave birth to a daughter by Henry, the future Jeanne III of Navarre, who became the mother of the future Henry IV of France.

A Venetian ambassador of that time praised Marguerite as knowing all the secrets of diplomatic art, hence to be treated with deference and circumspection. Marguerite's most remarkable adventure involved freeing her brother, King Francis I, who had been held prisoner in Spain by Charles V, Holy Roman Emperor after being captured in the Battle of Pavia, Italy, 1525. During a critical period of the negotiations, Queen Marguerite rode horseback through wintry woods, twelve hours a day for many days, to meet a safe-conduct deadline, while writing her diplomatic letters at night.

Her only son, Jean, was born in Blois on 7 July 1530, when Marguerite was thirty-eight. The child died on Christmas Day the same year. Scholars believe that her grief motivated Marguerite to write her most controversial work, Miroir de l'âme pécheresse (The Mirror of the Sinful Soul), in 1531.

Sorbonne theologians condemned the work as heresy. A monk said Marguerite should be sewn into a sack and thrown into the Seine. Students at the Collège de Navarre satirized her in a play as "a Fury from Hell". Her brother forced the charges to be dropped, however, and obtained an apology from the Sorbonne.

== Writer ==
Marguerite wrote many poems and plays. Her most notable works are a classic collection of short stories, the Heptaméron, and a remarkably intense religious poem, Miroir de l'âme pécheresse (The Mirror of the Sinful Soul). This poem is a first-person, mystical narrative of the soul as a yearning woman calling out to Christ as her father-brother-lover. Her work was passed to the royal court of England, suggesting that Marguerite had influence on the Protestant Reformation in England.

== Role in the Reformation ==
Following the expulsion of John Calvin and William Farel from Geneva in 1538, Marguerite de Navarre wrote to Marie Dentière, a notable Walloon Protestant reformer in Geneva. The two women appear to have personal history outside of their written correspondence: Marguerite was godmother to the daughter of Marie Dentière and Dentière's daughter composed a French guide to the Hebrew language to send to Marguerite's daughter. In her letter, Marguerite inquired what was the cause for Calvin and Farel's expulsion. Dentière responded in 1539 with the Epistre tres utile, commonly known today as the Epistle to Marguerite de Navarre. This epistle criticized the Protestant clergy who had expelled Calvin and Farel, asked for Marguerite's support and aid in increasing scriptural literacy and access among women, and advised her to act in expelling Catholic clergy from France.

During her years in France, Anne Boleyn had been a lady-in-waiting to Queen Claude. There is conjecture that the courts of Claude and Marguerite overlapped and that perhaps Anne was in service to Marguerite, not only to Claude, and may have become a follower of Marguerite's, absorbing her views about Christianity. A letter by Anne Boleyn after she became queen exists in which she makes strong expressions of affection to Marguerite.

It is conjectured that Marguerite gave Anne the original manuscript of Miroir de l'âme pécheresse at some point. It is certain that in 1544, nine years after Anne Boleyn's execution, Anne's daughter, who would become Elizabeth I (1533–1603), translated the poem into English prose as The Miroir or Glasse of the Synneful Soul when she was eleven years old and presented it, written in her own hand, to her then-stepmother, the English queen Katherine Parr. This literary connection between Marguerite, Anne Boleyn, Katherine Parr, and Elizabeth suggests a direct mentoring link or legacy of reformist religious convictions.

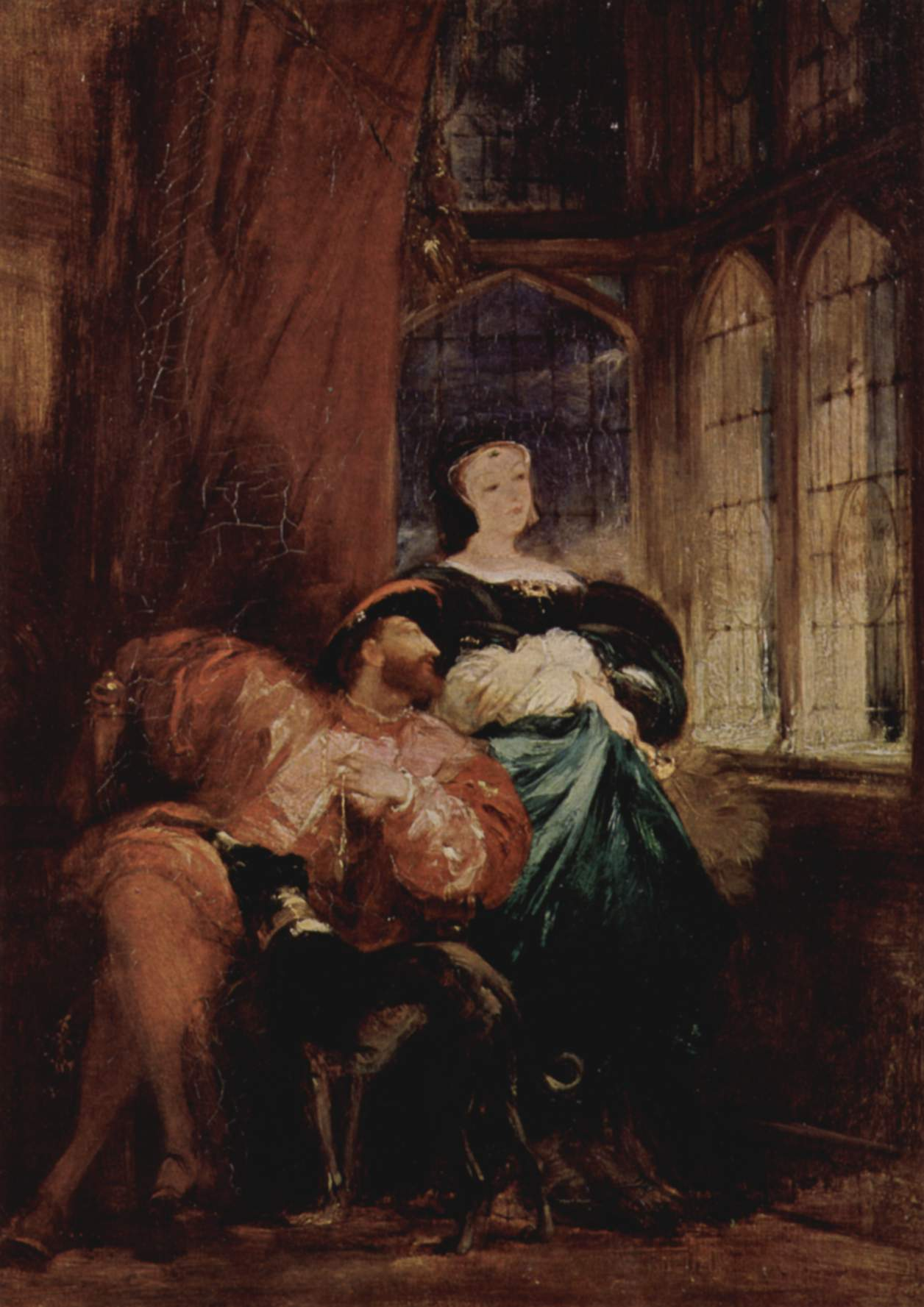
Francis I and Marguerite de Navarre by Richard Parkes Bonington

== Patron of the arts ==
As a generous patron of the arts, Marguerite befriended and protected many artists and writers, among them François Rabelais (1483–1553), Clément Marot (1496–1544), Claude de Bectoz (1490–1547), Pierre de Ronsard (1524–1585) and Julián Íñiguez de Medrano (1520's-1585-1588). Also, Marguerite served as a mediator between Roman Catholics and Protestants (including John Calvin). Although Marguerite espoused reform within the Catholic Church, she was not a Calvinist. She did, however, do her best to protect the reformers and dissuaded Francis I from intolerant measures as long as she could. After her death, eight religious wars occurred in France, including the notorious St. Bartholomew's Day Massacre of 1572.

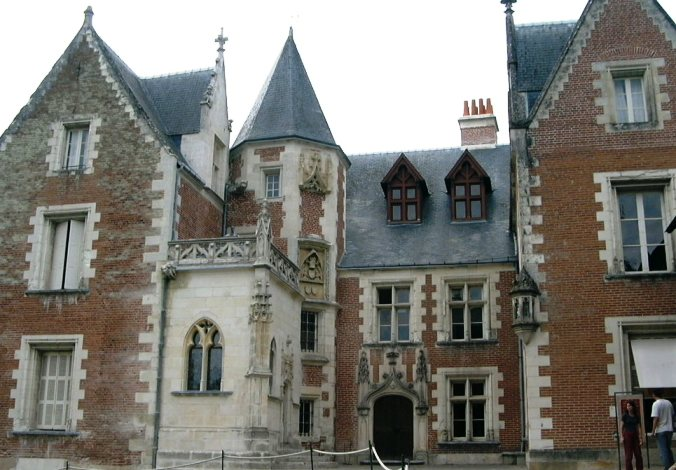
Clos Lucé in Amboise, France, where Leonardo da Vinci died in 1519

Leonardo da Vinci (1452–1519) died while guest of Marguerite and her brother, Francis I. They had been raised at Château d'Amboise, which belonged to their mother, Louise of Savoy. The king maintained his residence there and Marguerite maintained a residence nearby. During the first few years of the reign of Francis the château in which he lived reached the pinnacle of its glory. Leonardo had been the architect of a large château for them, among many other projects, and they provided quarters for him when he left Italy and joined her court. As a guest of the king, who provided him with a comfortable stipend, Leonardo da Vinci came to Château Amboise in December 1515 and lived and worked in the nearby Clos Lucé, connected to the château by an underground passage. Tourists are told that he is buried in the Chapel of Saint-Hubert, adjoining the Château, which had been built in 1491–96.

== Legacy ==
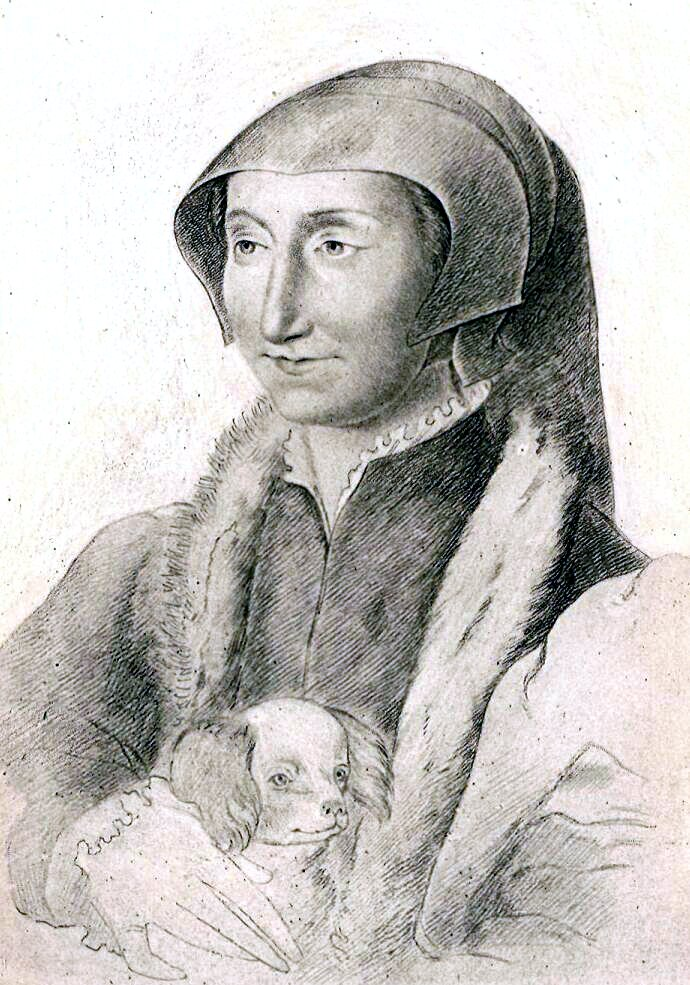
Marguerite de Navarre, from a crayon drawing by François Clouet, preserved at the Bibliothèque nationale de France, Paris

Pierre Brantôme said of her: "She was a great princess. But in addition to all that, she was very kind, gentle, gracious, charitable, a great dispenser of alms and friendly to all."

The Dutch humanist Erasmus wrote to her: "For a long time I have cherished all the many excellent gifts that God bestowed upon you; prudence worthy of a philosopher; chastity; moderation; piety; an invincible strength of soul, and a marvelous contempt for all the vanities of this world. Who could keep from admiring, in a great king's sister, such qualities as these, so rare even among the priests and monks."

In 1550, one year after Marguerite's death, a tributary poem, Annae, Margaritae, Ianae, sororum virginum heroidum Anglarum, in mortem Diuae Margaritae Valesiae, Nauarrorum Reginae, Hecatodistichon, was published in England. It was written by the nieces of Jane Seymour (1505–1537), third wife of King Henry VIII.

American historian Will Durant wrote: "In Marguerite the Renaissance and the Reformation were for a moment one. Her influence radiated throughout France. Every free spirit looked upon her as protectoress and ideal .... Marguerite was the embodiment of charity. She would walk unescorted in the streets of Navarre, allowing any one to approach her and would listen at first hand to the sorrows of the people. She called herself 'The Prime Minister of the Poor'. Henri, her husband, King of Navarre, believed in what she was doing, even to the extent of setting up a public works system that became a model for France. Together he and Marguerite financed the education of needy students."

Jules Michelet (1798–1874), the most celebrated historian of his time, wrote of her: "Let us always remember this tender Queen of Navarre, in whose arms our people, fleeing from prison or the pyre, found safety, honor, and friendship. Our gratitude to you, Mother of our [French] Renaissance! Your hearth was that of our saints, your heart the nest of our freedom."

Pierre Bayle (1647–1706), French philosopher and critic, whose Dictionnaire historique et critique (Historical and Critical Dictionary, 1697) greatly influenced the French Encyclopedists and the rationalist philosophers of the eighteenth century, such as Voltaire and Diderot, esteemed her highly, writing: "... for a queen to grant her protection to people persecuted for opinions which she believes to be false; to open a sanctuary to them; to preserve them from the flames prepared for them; to furnish them with a subsistence; liberally to relieve the troubles and inconveniences of their exile, is an heroic magnanimity which has hardly any precedent ..."

== Ancestry ==
Ancestors of Marguerite of Angoulême

8. Louis I, Duke of Orléans
4. John, Count of Angoulême
9. Valentina Visconti
2. Charles, Count of Angoulême
10. Alain IX, Viscount of Rohan
5. Marguerite de Rohan
11. Margaret of Brittany
1. Marguerite of Angoulême
12. Louis, Duke of Savoy
6. Philip II, Duke of Savoy
13. Anne of Cyprus
3. Louise of Savoy
14. Charles I, Duke of Bourbon
7. Margaret of Bourbon
15. Agnes of Burgundy

== Sources ==
- Patricia F. Cholakian and Rouben C. Cholakian. Marguerite de Navarre: Mother of the Renaissance. New York, Columbia University Press, 2006. 448 pp. excerpt
- Randall, Michael. "Marguerite de Navarre and Ambiguous Deceit." Sixteenth Century Journal 47.3 (2016) pp. 579–598.
- Reid, Jonathan A. (2009). Gow, Andrew Colin (ed.). King's Sister – Queen of Dissent: Marguerite of Navarre (1492-1549) and her Evangelical Network. Brill.
- Roelker, Nancy Lyman (1968). Queen of Navarre, Jeanne d'Albret. Harvard University Press.
- Williams, H. Noel. The pearl of princesses : the life of Marguerite d'Angoulême, Queen of Navarre (1916) online
- Putnam, Samuel, Marguerite of Navarre, Grosset & Dunlap, New York, 1936.
- Winn, Colette H. "An instance of narrative seduction: The HeptamEron of Marguerite De Navarre." Symposium: A Quarterly Journal in Modern Literatures (1985) 39#3 pp. 217–226.
- Hackett, Francis, Francis The First, pages 48–52, Doubleday, Doran and Company, Inc., Garden City, New York, 1937.online
- Durant, Will, The Story of Civilization, v. VI, The Reformation, p. 501, Simon and Schuster, New York, 1953.
- Jourda, Pierre, Une princesse de la Renaissance, Marguerite d'Angoulême, reine de Navarre, 1492–1549, Genève, Slatkine Reprints, 1973.
- Anderson Magalhães, Le Comédies bibliques di Margherita di Navarra, tra evangelismo e mistero medievale, in La mujer: de los bastidores al proscenio en el teatro del siglo XVI, ed. de I. Romera Pintor y J. L. Sirera, Valencia, Publicacions de la Universitat de València, 2011, pp. 171–201.
- Anderson Magalhães, «Trouver une eaue vive et saine»: la cura del corpo e dell'anima nell'opera di Margherita di Navarra, in Le salut par les eaux et par les herbes: medicina e letteratura tra Italia e Francia nel Cinquecento e nel Seicento, a cura di R. Gorris Camos, Verona, Cierre Edizioni, 2012, pp. 227–262.
- Dale, Hilda (translated by), The Prisons of Marguerite de Navarre, Whiteknights Press, Reading, U.K, 1989.

Marguerite de Navarre House of Valois, Orléans-Angoulême branch Cadet branch of the Capetian dynasty Born: 11 April 1492 Died: 21 December 1549
French royalty
Preceded by Juana Enríquez	Queen consort of Navarre; 1527–1549	Succeeded by Marguerite de Valois
French nobility
Preceded by Charles IV	Duchess of Alençon; Countess of Armagnac and Perche; 1525–1549	Reverted to the royal domain
