= Eckbert of Schönau =

Eckbert (c. 1120 – 1184) was a Benedictine abbot of Schönau, a writer, and brother of the mystic Elisabeth of Schönau, whose life he recorded.

== Life ==
Eckbert was born in the early part of the twelfth century of a distinguished, devout family named Hartwig, along the Middle Rhine. He was the brother of Elisabeth of Schönau (1129-1164), whose life he wrote and whose works he published. He studied in Paris, and was for a time canon in the collegiate church of Sts. Cassius and Florentius at Bonn.

The monastery of St. Florin in Schönau im Taunus was a double monastery. His younger sister Elizabeth, whose health had never been strong, had first entered the women's convent many years earlier as a student at the age of twelve. Despite objections from other members of the family, at Elizabeth's urging to come and record her visions, in 1155 he became a Benedictine at the monastery in Schönau. While a canon at Bonn he often had occasion to speak with Cathars, and after his monastic profession, was invited by Rainald of Dassel, Archbishop of Cologne, to debate publicly with the leaders of the sect in Cologne itself.

Around 1155 several tombs were discovered in Cologne, which were soon reported to contain the remains of Saint Ursula and her companions. This prompted Eckbert to compose a new account of her story. During the papal schism that followed the death of Pope Adrian IV, Eckbert supported Victor IV out of loyalty to the Emperor. In 1166, after the death of the first abbot, Hildelin, he was placed at the head of the monastery. As abbot, he promoted devotion to the Immaculate Heart of Mary. Theodore A. Koehler, S.M. credits Eckbert as "the first to compose a prayer in honor of Mary’s Immaculate Heart".

Eckbert preached and wrote much defending Church teachings against the doctrines of the Cathars. Around 1163, he wrote fourteen sermons against Catharism, Sermones contra Catharos. He drew from Augustine of Hippo's discussion of the Manichæans to describe what he believed to be their origins, but distinguished the contemporary sect from the earlier version. Eckbert offers a detailed account of the early stage of Catharism in the Rhineland.

Upon her death in 1164, Elizabeth, who was by then Abbess, admonished her brother to remain in the cloister. Although he was later offered higher appointments, he followed her advice. Eckbert died in 1185 and was buried next to his sister near the high altar in the monastery church.

== Works ==
Eckbert's writings on the humanity of Christ influenced Bonaventure's Lignum vitae. On the death of Eizabeth in 1164, he wrote the mournful treatise De obitu dominae Elisabeth.

Among his works are:

- De Laude Crucis (Patrologia Latina, CXCV)
- Soliloquium seu Meditationes - 18 prayers or meditations praising the love of Jesus Christ.
- Ad Beatam Virginem Deiparam sermo Panegyricus (Patrologia Latina, CXCV, CLXXXIV)
- De sanctâ Elizabethâ virgine, a biography of his sister Elizabeth of Schönau, a Benedictine nun and famous visionary and mystic, a portion of which is in Patrologia Latina, CXCV, also in Acta Sanctorum, June, IV, 501 sqq. (ed. Victor Palmé, 1867).
- Stimulus Amoris (Goad of Love) - a treatise on Christ's Passion formerly attributed to Bernard of Clairvaux.
- Complete edition of his works in Roth, "Die Visionen der hl. Elisabeth und die Schriften der Aebte Ekbert und Emecho von Schönau" (Brno, 1884).

== Attribution ==
- Herbermann, Charles, ed. (1913). "Eckebert" . Catholic Encyclopedia. New York: Robert Appleton Company.
