= Francis Pierrepont Barnard =

Francis Pierrepont Barnard (1854–1931) was an English schoolman, archaeologist and numismatist. He was Headmaster of Reading School, and later Professor of Mediaeval Archaeology at the University of Liverpool. He published a translation of select Greek, Latin and French epigrams: A Fardel of Epigrams (London: Oxford UP, 1922).
