= The Miroir or Glasse of the Synneful Soul =

16th-century manuscript

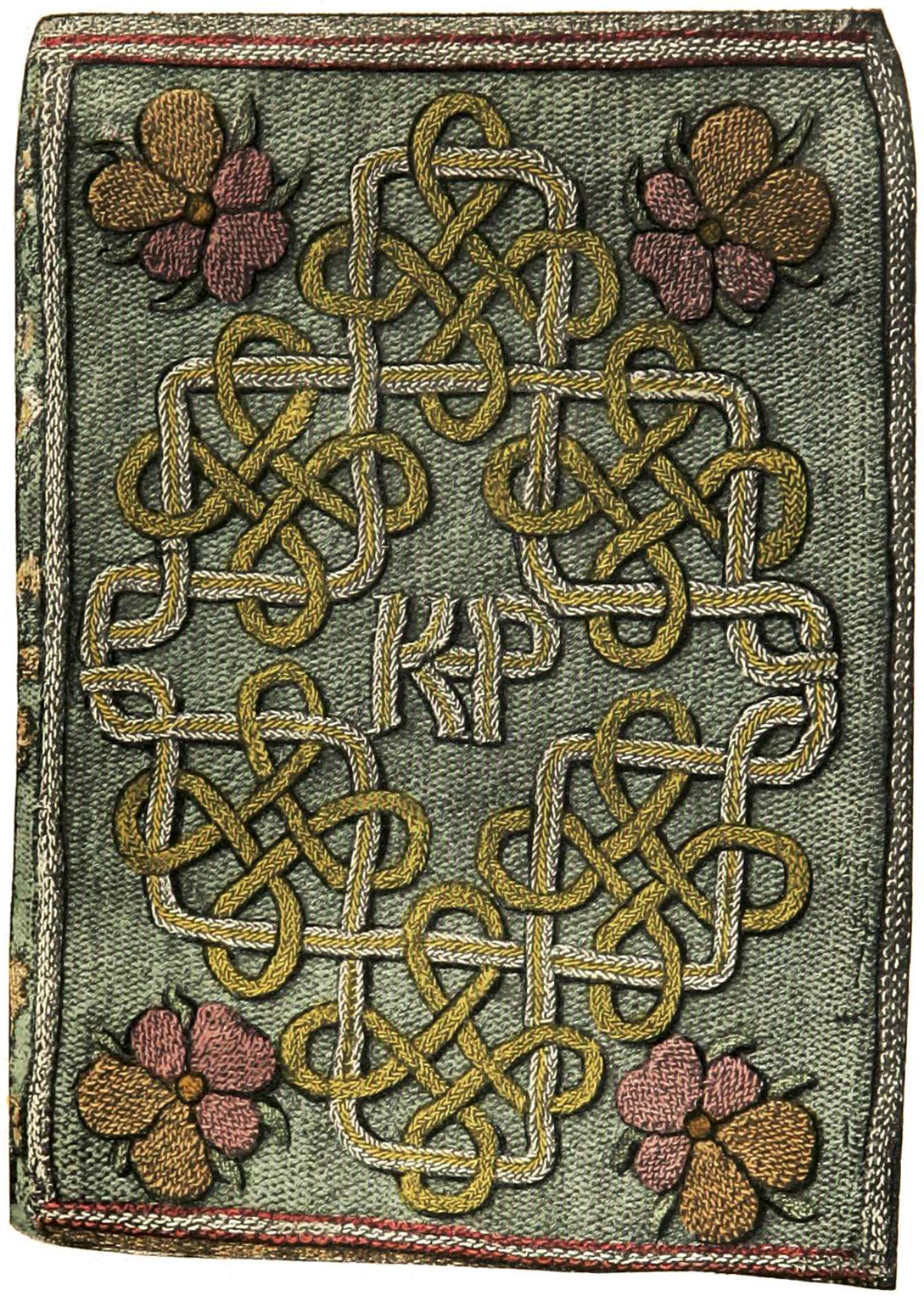
The edited photo shows what the embroidered front cover of The Miroir or Glasse of the Synneful Soul would have looked like in 1544; the original can be seen in the Bodleian Library.

The Miroir or Glasse of the Synneful Soul is a manuscript book that was given to Catherine Parr by her stepdaughter, the future Queen Elizabeth I in 1544, when Elizabeth was eleven years old. Elizabeth translated the poem from the French work Miroir de l'âme pécheresse by Marguerite de Navarre, into English prose and wrote the manuscript with her own hand, dedicating it with the words, "From Assherige, the last daye of the yeare of our Lord God 1544 ... To our most noble and vertuous Quene Katherin, Elizabeth her humble daughter wisheth perpetuall felicitie and everlasting joye," Elizabeth probably also embroidered the bookbinding. This book is now owned by the Bodleian Library.

== Prayers of Queen Katherine Parr ==
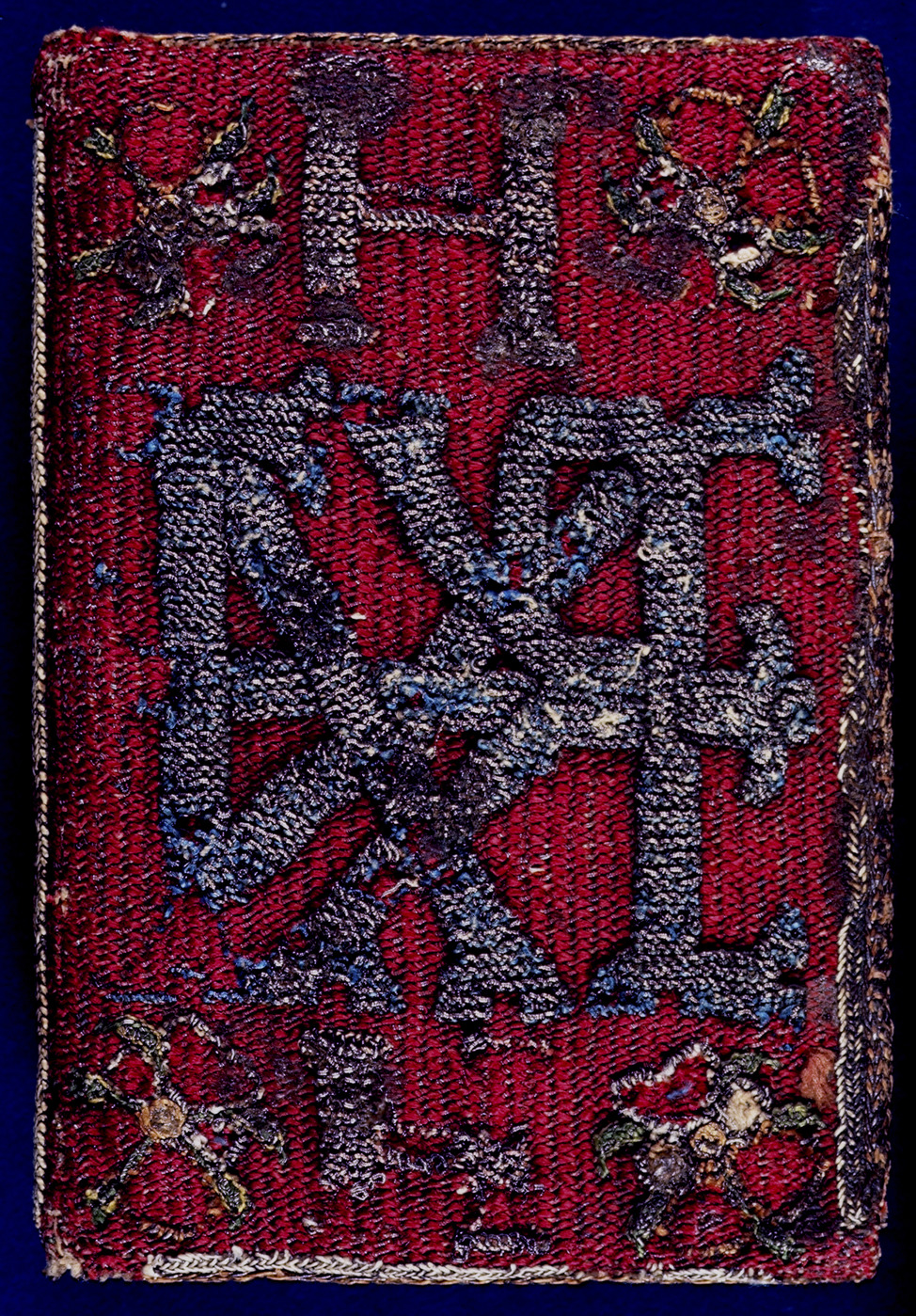
Prayers of Queen Katherine Parr

A second embroidered manuscript book, entitled Prayers of Queen Katherine Parr, is also attributed to Elizabeth as a gift to the queen dated 20 December 1545. It contains prayers or meditations the queen had originally composed in English, which the princess had translated into French, Latin and Italian, handwritten in the princess's hand on vellum. The inscription reads "Precationes ... ex piis scriptoribus per nobiliss. et pientiss. D. Catharinam Anglie, Francie, Hibernieq. reginam collecte, et per D. Elizabetam ex anglico converse." It is, moreover, dedicated to Elizabeth's father Henry VIII, the wording being, "Illustrissimo Henrico octavo, Anglie, Francie, Hibernieq. regi," etc.

== Embroidery ==
=== The Miroir or Glasse of the Synneful Soul ===
The Miroir or Glasse of the Synneful Soul measures about seven by five inches (180 by 125 mm) and has an identical design on both covers, worked in blue silk in a tapestry stitch over canvas with interlacing scrollwork of gold and silver braid that joins the queen's initials K.P. in the center. Each corner of the front depicts a heartsease (Viola) in purple, green and yellow silk with gold thread. The back cover is well worn; its corner embroidery is difficult to identify, but was probably floral.

=== Prayers of Queen Katherine Parr ===
The second book is smaller than the first, only 5 3/4 by 4 in (145 by 100 mm), and is also bound in canvas. The background is red silk worked in a similar stitching method to the Miroir cover. Most of the design is a large monogram in blue silk and silver thread that contains the letters K, A, F, H, and R. The K refers to Katherine and the other letters probably signify Latin initials for rulership (actual or claimed) of England, France and Ireland. Like the first book, heartsease flowers decorate the corners. The back cover is worn beyond recognition.

=== Similarities ===
Both book dedications declare that the written content is the work of Elizabeth. Although no written record definitively affirms the tradition that Elizabeth also worked these embroideries, experts affirm that both covers are the handiwork of the same craftswoman. They use similar heavy grades of silk and silver thread, with thematically similar motifs and similar stitching. Elizabeth is known to have made and embroidered a shirt for her brother Prince Edward when she was six years old. She was an accomplished needlewoman in an era when needlework was held in high esteem.

Cyril Davenport particularly notes the canvas covers as evidence that these embroideries were worked in Elizabeth's own hand. "Canvas bindings were rare – most of the embroidered work on books of that period were splendid works on velvet...instead of very elementary braid work." Canvas is easier to embroider than velvet and there could have been little other reason to use a cheap material for a royal gift, except to facilitate a child's handiwork.

== See also ==
- English Reformation
- Manuscript culture
- Miniature (illuminated manuscript)
- Speculum literature
