= Isobel D. Thornley =

Historian of medieval England

- Born: 1893; Southwell, Nottinghamshire, England
- Died: 5 February 1941 (aged 47–48); Highgate, London, England
- Cause of death: Injuries sustained in an air raid
- Education: University College, Nottingham; University College London
- Occupation: Historian

Isobel Dorothy Thornley FRHS FSA (1893 – 5 February 1941) was a British historian of medieval England who compiled and edited works on legal history, the Yorkists, Richard II, and medieval sanctuary. She was a lecturer at University College London and later an independent scholar editing medieval law reports. She died when her home was hit by a bomb during the London Blitz. She left money to the University of London who award grants from her bequest for the publication of books that would not otherwise be published and to support candidates registered for a PhD at the university.

== Early life and education ==
Isobel Thornley was born in Southwell, Nottinghamshire, in 1893.

She earned her BA at University College, Nottingham, in 1915, and her MA at University College London, in 1917 where she studied under Albert Pollard, the founder of the Institute of Historical Research. She won the Alexander Prize of the Royal Historical Society for her essay on the treason legislation of Henry VIII.

== Career ==
Thornley joined University College London as an assistant in 1919 becoming assistant lecturer in 1925 and then spending a year as an assistant professor of history at Vassar College in the United States from 1925 to 1926. She returned to University College and rose to the position of lecturer before resigning in 1930 for unknown reasons. She had an income from her father's estate which allowed her to continue her historical research.

Her publications include the sourcebook England Under the Yorkists 1460–1485: Illustrated from Contemporary Sources (1920), editing the Yearbook of Richard II 1387–1388 (1937) with Theodore F. T. Plucknett, and editing a new de-luxe edition of The Great Chronicle of London (attributed to Robert Fabyan) with the archivist A. H. Thomas in 1938. She also produced a number of articles including three on medieval sanctuary. At the time of her death she was building on her work editing the Richard II yearbook by editing medieval law reports for the Ames Foundation of Harvard Law School and Britain's Selden Society.

Her scholarly approach was described by Shannon McSheffrey of Concordia University as "uncompromising, audacious, and somewhat prickly" and with a Whiggishness that showed her debt to her tutor Albert Pollard.

She was honorary secretary of the British Archaeological Association, a fellow of the Royal Historical Society and from 1939 a fellow of the Society of Antiquaries of London.

== Death and legacy ==
Thornley died, unmarried, on 5 February 1941 when her home of 6 Cholmeley Crescent in Highgate was hit by a bomb during the London Blitz. The house had already been damaged by a bomb in September 1940. She left an estate of £12,806 subject to pendente lite. She left money to the University of London who award grants from the Isobel Thornley Bequest to support the publication of works that would not otherwise be published, while the Institute of Historical Research award grants funded by her bequest to support candidates registered for a PhD at the University of London.

== Selected publications ==
=== Books ===
- England Under the Yorkists 1460–1485: Illustrated from Contemporary Sources. Longmans, London, 1920. Preface by A. F. Pollard.
- The Yearbook of Richard II 1387–1388. Spottiswoode, Ballantyne & Co., London, 1937. (editor with Theodore F. T. Plucknett)
- Fabyan, Robert. (attrib.) The Great Chronicle of London. Corporation of the City of London/Guildhall Library, London, 1938. (editor with A. H. Thomas) Reprinted, Alan Sutton, 1983.
- Pearse Chope, R. The Book of Hartland. Devonshire Press, Torquay, 1940. (editor)

=== Articles and chapters ===
- "Treason by Words in the Fifteenth Century", The English Historical Review, Vol. 32, No. 128 (October 1917), pp. 556–561.
- "The Sanctuary Register of Beverley", The English Historical Review, Vol. 34, No. 135 (July 1919), pp. 393–397.
- "The Destruction of Sanctuary" in R. W. Seton-Watson (Ed.) (1924) Tudor Studies Presented by the Board of Studies in History in the University of London to Albert Frederick Pollard: Being the Work of Twelve of his Colleagues and Pupils. London: Longmans, Green & Company. pp. 182–207.
- "Hartland Parish Documents" in Bulletin of the Institute of Historical Research, 1927.
- "Sanctuary in Medieval London", Journal of the British Archaeological Association, Second Series, Vol. 38 (1933), No. 2, pp. 293–315.
