= Robert of Avesbury =

English historian (??–1359)

Robert of Avesbury (died 1359) was an English historian.

He describes himself in the title of his work as "Keeper of the Registry of the Court of Canterbury". Beyond this fact nothing is known of him. He compiled a history of the "mirabilia gesta" of Edward III down to 1356; his chief interest is in military history, and especially in the French war. To ecclesiastical and civil affairs he pays little attention. His work opens with a short sketch of the reign of Edward II, and the wars with Scotland are told with comparative brevity. The continental wars from 1339 to 1356 occupy nine-tenths of his narrative. Robert is no more than a painstaking chronicler, but his history has special importance because he incorporated in his text original documents and letters, including those of Michael de Northburgh. There are three manuscripts: Harley MS 200 in the British Library, MS Douce 128 in the Bodleian Library, and Trinity College MS. R v. 32; the first is the archetype, the two latter are derived from it through an intermediate copy. Robert of Avesbury's chronicle ("Historia de Mirabilibus Gestis Edwardi III") was published by Thomas Hearne, Oxford, 1720. It has been re-edited by Sir E. Maunde Thompson, with the chronicle of Adam Murimuth, in the Rolls Series, 1889. Robert of Avesbury's original manuscript is also one of the few credible eyewitness accounts of the Black Death and the flagellants.
