= Florinus of Remüs =

9th-century christian saint

Saint Florinus of Remüs
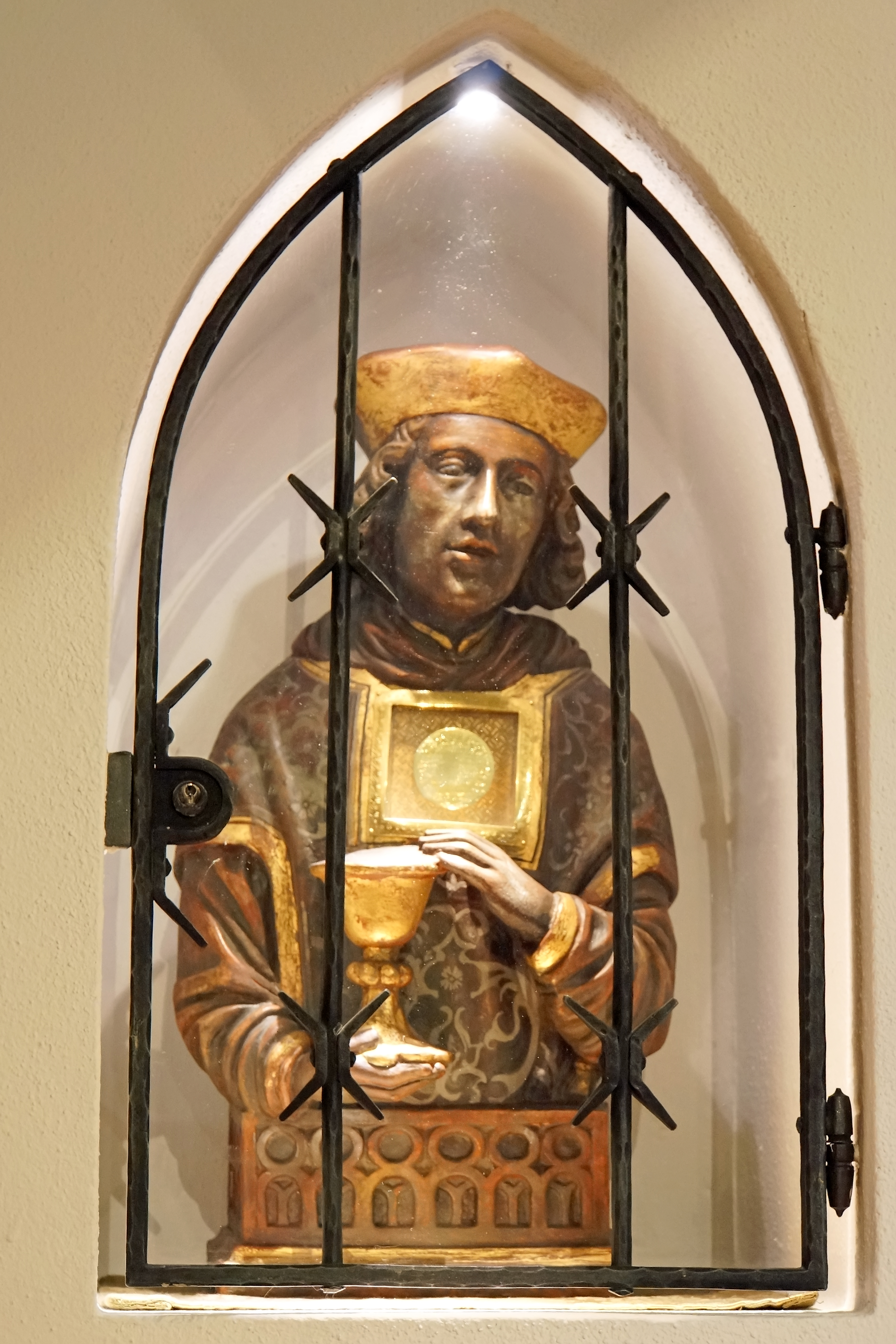
- Bust of St. Florinus in Cathedral of Vaduz (Liechtenstein).

Priest and Confessor
- Died: 856 AD
- Venerated in: Roman Catholic Church
- Feast: 17 November
- Attributes: bottle or glass of wine
- Patronage: Vinschgau Valley; Engadin; Roman Catholic Archdiocese of Vaduz; Diocese of Chur

Florinus of Remüs (died 856 AD), also known as Florin, Florian of Chur, Florinus of Matsch, and Florinus of Vinschgau, is venerated as a saint in the Catholic Church, particularly in the dioceses of Chur, Bolzano-Brixen, Vaduz, and in the Rhineland.

== History ==
Little is known of his life, as there is no early vita. Florinus may have been the son of an Anglo-Saxon man and Jewish woman, who converted to Christianity and had settled at Matsch (Mazia) in the Vinschgau Valley on their way back from a pilgrimage to Rome.

Florinus received his education from a priest at Unterengadin, where he was also ordained. He then worked as a priest at Remüs (Ramosch).

Miracles are attributed to him, including the turning of water into wine. After his death, numerous miracles were said to have taken place at his tomb in the parish church of Remüs.

== Veneration ==
He is called a confessor of the Faith rather than a martyr. After his death, the popularity of his cult increased, and his relics were distributed to various places, including the Florinskirche at Koblenz (in 950 AD) and also Regensburg. Vaduz Cathedral and the parish church at Matsch (Mazia) are also dedicated to him. He is depicted in a stained-glass window at Chur Cathedral.

Florinus is the patron saint of Chur.

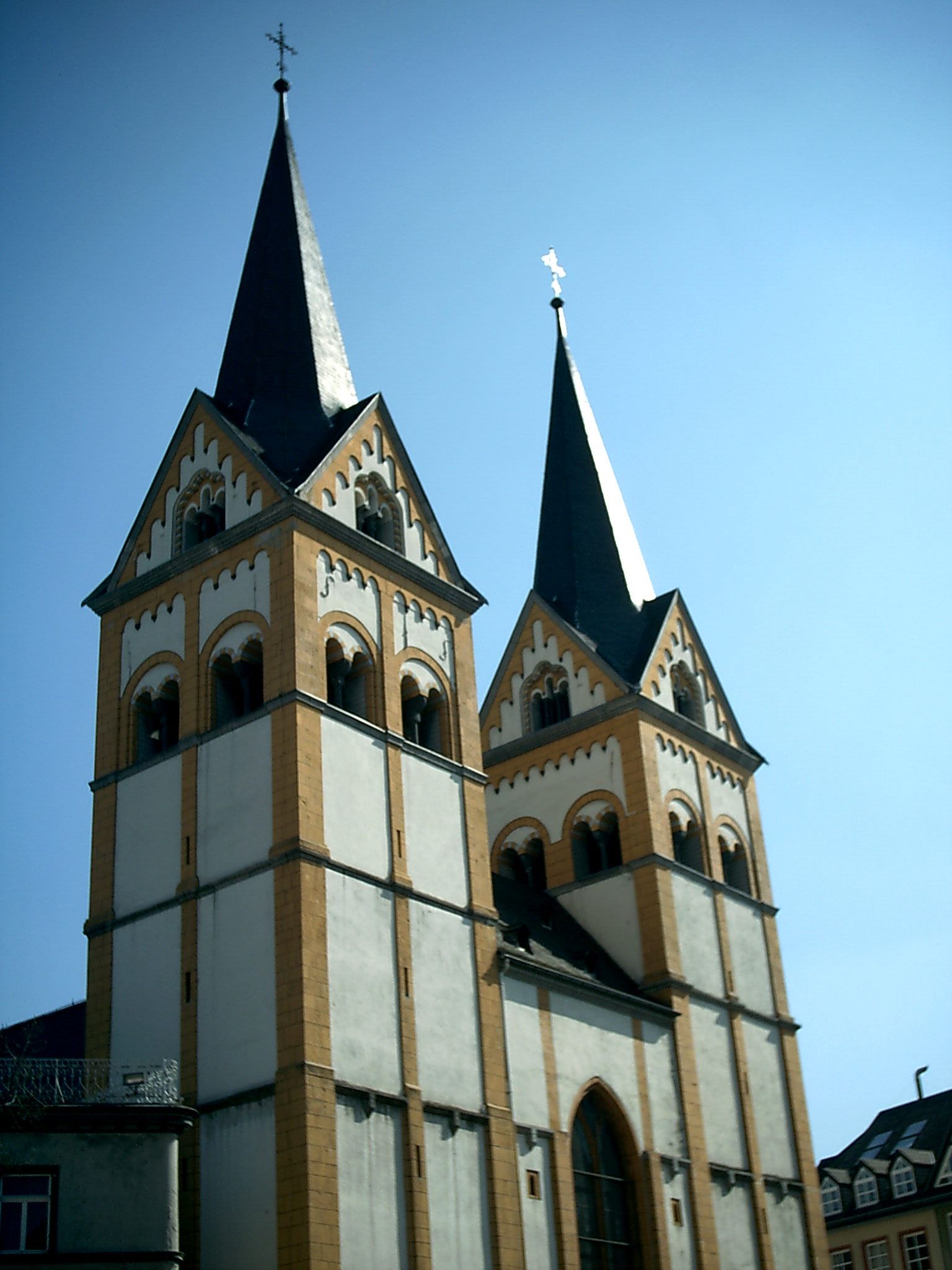
Florinskirche, Koblenz

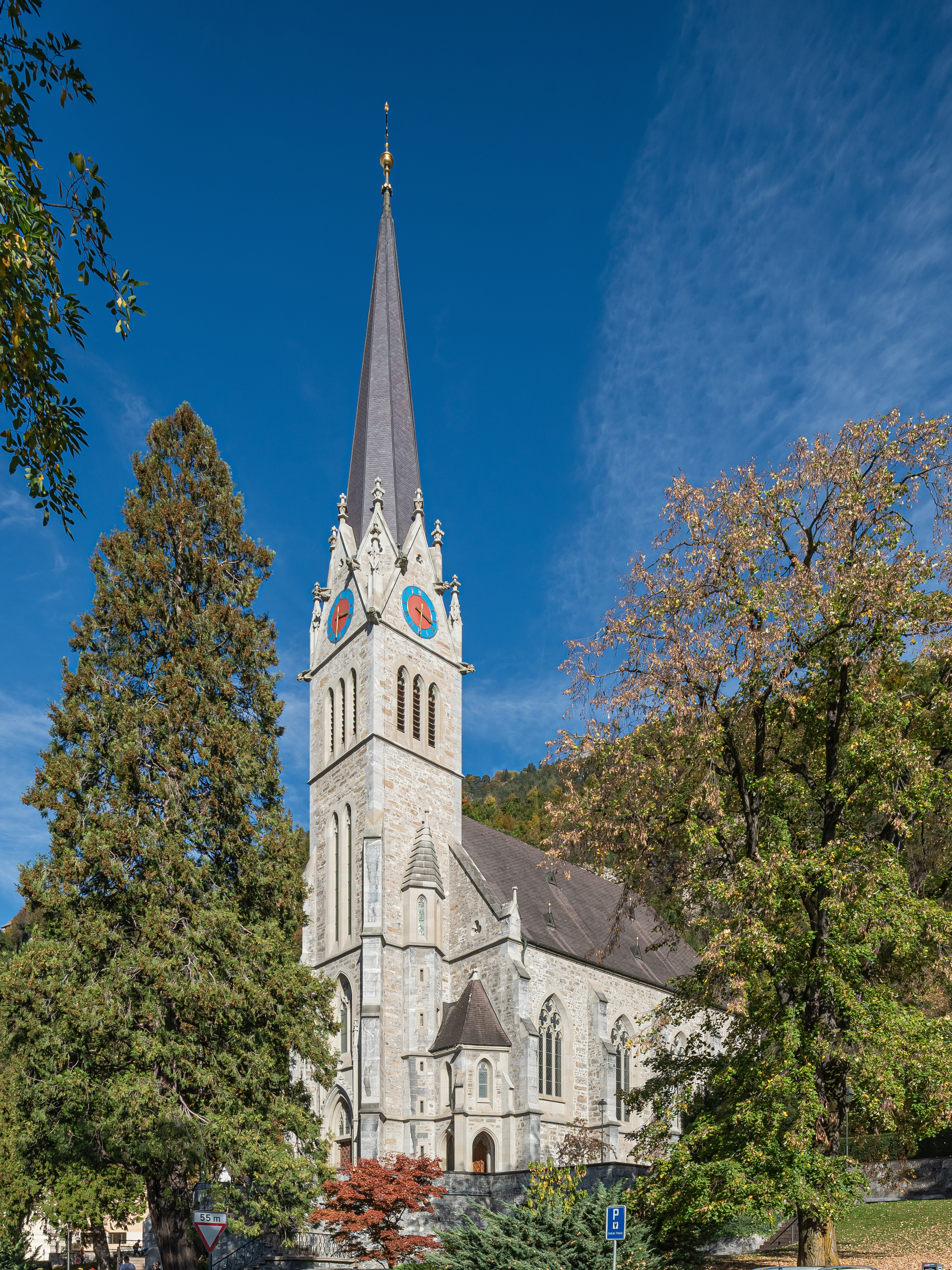
Vaduz Cathedral

== Sources ==
- Jan-Andrea Bernhard: Geschichtliche Einführung in das Wirken und die Wirkung des heiligen Florinus; in: Der Schlern 81 (2007), S. 20–47.
- Jan-Andrea Bernhard: Streit um einen Heiligen: der Heilige Florinus von Ramosch als Zankapfel in Geschichte und Gegenwart; in: Bündner Monatsblatt 2006, Nr.1, S. 35–67.
- Alfred Pothmann: Der heilige Florinus: aus der Geschichte der Heiligenverehrung im Stift Essen; in: Das Münster am Hellweg 37 (1984), S. 14–21.
- Hedwig Röckelein: Der Kult des heiligen Florinus im Stift Essen, in: Jan Gerchow et al. (eds.): Essen und die sächsischen Frauenstifte im frühen Mittelalter; Essen 2003, S. 59–86.
