= Virginia de Castro e Almeida =

Portuguese author and filmmaker

Virginia de Castro e Almeida (née Virgínia Folque de Castro e Almeida Pimentel Sequiera e Abreu; 24 November 1874 – 22 January 1945) was a Portuguese writer. She is remembered for being a pioneer in Portuguese children's literature, translating important cultural texts, and as being a film director and founding her own film company, Fortuna Films.

== Early life and education ==
Virgínia de Castro e Almeida took an interest in writing from the age of 8. She began by writing dramatic stories, and in later years would dedicate herself to writing books for children.

== Career ==
=== In literature ===
In 1894, she started publishing her works under the pen-name Gy. Her first publication under this name was Fada Tendora ("The Tempting Fairy"), which is considered a key piece of work in Portuguese children's literature. In 1907, a collection of her various works was published under the Livarario Clássica Editoria as Biblioteca para meus Filhos ("Library for my Children"). She was concerned with women's education and published books about housekeeping and children, Como Devo Governar a Minha Casa ("How to Run my Household") in 1906, and Como Devemos Criar e Educar os Nossos Filhos ("How to Manage my Children's Education") in 1908. She also wanted to teach children science and published several books with that aim, starting in 1907: Céu Aberto ("Open Skies") (1907), Em Pleno Azul ("Full Blue") (1907), Pela Terra e pelo Ar ("For The Earth and Air") (1911), and As Lições de André ("Lessons with André") (1913).

In 1918, Virginia moved to France and later Switzerland. She helped to disseminate and promote Portuguese literature through translating the works of historical and literary figures such as João de Barros and Garcia de Resende e Camões. Other translated works also includes historical topics dealing with Portuguese notables such as Henry the Navigator, as well as Marcus Aurelius, Cervantes, Charles Dickens, George Sand, and many more during the late 1930s and early 1940s. In an effort to encourage a love of history in children, she wrote a series of books including História de Dona Redonda e da sua Gente ("History of Dona Redonda and her People") (1942) and de Aventuras de Dona Redonda ("The Adventures of Dona Redonda") (1943). The Dona Redonda books were successful, and de Almeida has been described by José António Gomes as "one of the most outstanding Portuguese writers of children's books".

=== In government ===
While in Switzerland, de Almeida was employed under the League of Nations under the Portuguese government in Geneva. She served as one of the seven members of the Committee of Experts on Slavery (CES) of the League of Nations in 1932-1933.

She also wrote books about the historical and political values of the New State of Portugal which was emerging at the time while working under the Secretariat of National Propaganda.

=== In film ===
In 1922, Virgínia founded Fortuna Films and became a producer due to her passion in cinematography. The headquarters of Fortuna Films was based in Virgínia's own house in Paris at Rue Monmatre, while Rue de S. Bento in Lisbon housed the Portuguese office, which was near another important Portuguese film company at the time. A prolific film director, pt:Roger Lion, was hired by de Almeida, and the company produced only two films before either party could prove to sustain their short-lived venture. She cites one reason for founding her own film company thusly: "Portuguese films up until now are not perfect. Sometimes the action drags, it was boring for people that were used to seeing beauty and art, listening to music made specifically for what they were seeing".

==== A Sereia de Pedra ====
A blacksmith living in the town of Tomar, part of a colony of Portugal, is good friends with a bullfighter named Antonio.

==== Olhos da Alma ====
In the town of Nazaré, two classes exist: one is the more important Diogo de Sousa and his family who are the boat owners. The other are the fishermen of lower means who send their trawlers out to sea tirelessly under the responsibility of António Dias, a man hardened by the ocean and respected by his fellow fishermen. Diogo starts a revolution between the classes. He takes refuge in his friend Rodrigo de Meneses' house, and quickly takes a liking to his daughter Isolda. There, he discovers a secret, and uses it to convince Isolda to marry him. Others hear word of these events, and Diogo must run once again. Isolda, shocked by these new circumstances, is conflicted over her feelings of love for her cousin Alvaro.

===== Reception and controversy =====
This film is credited as putting the town of Nazaré onto the map of Portuguese cinema. Olhos da Alma gave light to the political situation of Portugal at the time, and almost caused a civil war during the end of Portugal's First Republic.
Olhos da Alma was screened in Portugal, Brazil, and France, and received a great deal of criticism within its own country. This greatly affected Virgínia de Castro e Almeida. Roger Lion made numerous changes to the film which she complained about and did not approve of. The controversy brought about by the film resulted in the loss of interest and bankruptcy of Fortuna Films, marking the death of Virgínia's film career.

== Other notable achievements ==
In 1920, Virginia e Castro de Almeida, created a prize which would grant the year's best film made in France an award of 5 million francs.

== Death ==
Virginia e Castro de Almeida died on 22 January 1945 in Lisbon, Portugal.

== Filmography ==
Year	Title	Producer	Director	Company
1923	A Sereia de Pedra	Virgínia de Castro e Almeida	Roger Lion	Fortuna Films
1924	Olhos da Alma	Virgínia de Castro e Almeida	Roger Lion	Fortuna Films

== List of published works ==
Year	Title	English title	Additional notes
1894	"Fada Tendora"	"The Tempting Fairy"	Anthology
1906	"Como Devo Governar a Minha Casa"	"How to Run my Household"	
1907	"Biblioteca para meus Filhos"	"Library for my Children"	
1907	"Céu Aberto"	"Open Skies"	
1907	"Em Pleno Azul"	"Full Blue"	
1908	"Como Devemos Criar e Educar os Nossos Filhos"	"How to Manage my Children's Education"	
1911	"Pela Terra e pelo Ar"	"For The Earth and Air"	
1913	"As Lições de André"	"Lessons with André"	
1936–1938	"Les Grands Navigateurs et Colons Portugais du XVe et du XVIe siècle – Antologie des Ecrits de l'Epoque"	"The Great Navigators and Portuguese Settlers of the Fifteenth and Sixteenth Centuries - Anthology of Writings of the Era"	Anthology
1940	"Conquests and Discoveries of Henry the Navigator"		
1940	"Itinéraire Historique du Portugal"	"Historical Itinerary of Portugal"	
1942	"História de Dona Redonda e da sua Gente"	"The History of Dona Redonda and her People"	
1943	"de Aventuras de Dona Redonda"	"The Adventures of Dona Redonda"	
