= Strüth =

- Municipality
- Coat of arms

- Location of Strüth within Rhein-Lahn-Kreis district
- Interactive map of Strüth
- Location within Germany Location within Rhineland-Palatinate
- Coordinates: 50°8′23″N 7°53′21″E
- Country: Germany
- State: Rhineland-Palatinate
- District: Rhein-Lahn-Kreis
- Municipal assoc.: Nastätten

Government
  - Mayor (2019–24): Heiko Koch

Area
  - Total: 4.66 km^{2} (1.80 sq mi)
- Elevation: 380 m (1,250 ft)

Population (2025-12-31)
  - Total: 314
  - Density: 67.4/km^{2} (175/sq mi)
- Time zone: UTC+01:00 (CET)
  - Summer (DST): UTC+02:00 (CEST)
- Postal codes: 56357
- Dialling codes: 06775
- Vehicle registration: EMS, DIZ, GOH
- Website: www.strueth.de

Strüth is a municipality in the district of Rhein-Lahn, in Rhineland-Palatinate, in western Germany.
