= Irmengard of Oettingen =

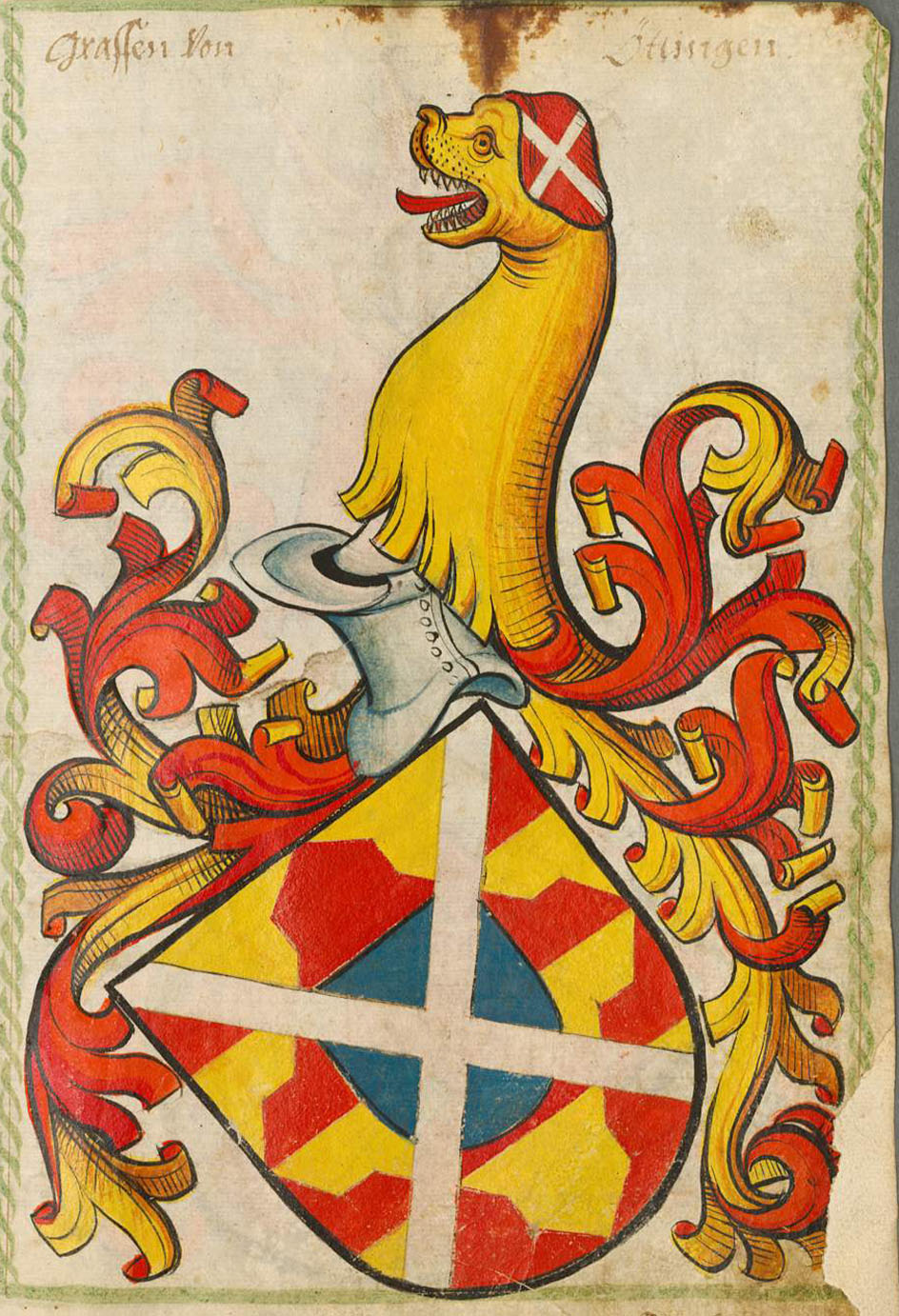
- Family coat of arms of the Counts of Oettingen
- Born: c. 1304
- Died: 6 November 1389; Worms, Germany
- Buried: Liebenau monastery in Worms
- Noble family: Oettingen
- Spouse: Adolf, Count Palatine of the Rhine
- Father: Louis VI of Oettingen
- Mother: Agnes of Württemberg

Irmengard of Oettingen (c. 1304 – 6 November 1389) was a princess of the Counts von Oettingen by birth, and by marriage, Countess Palatine of the Rhine and, as a widow, a Dominican nun.

== Life ==
=== Countess Palatine ===
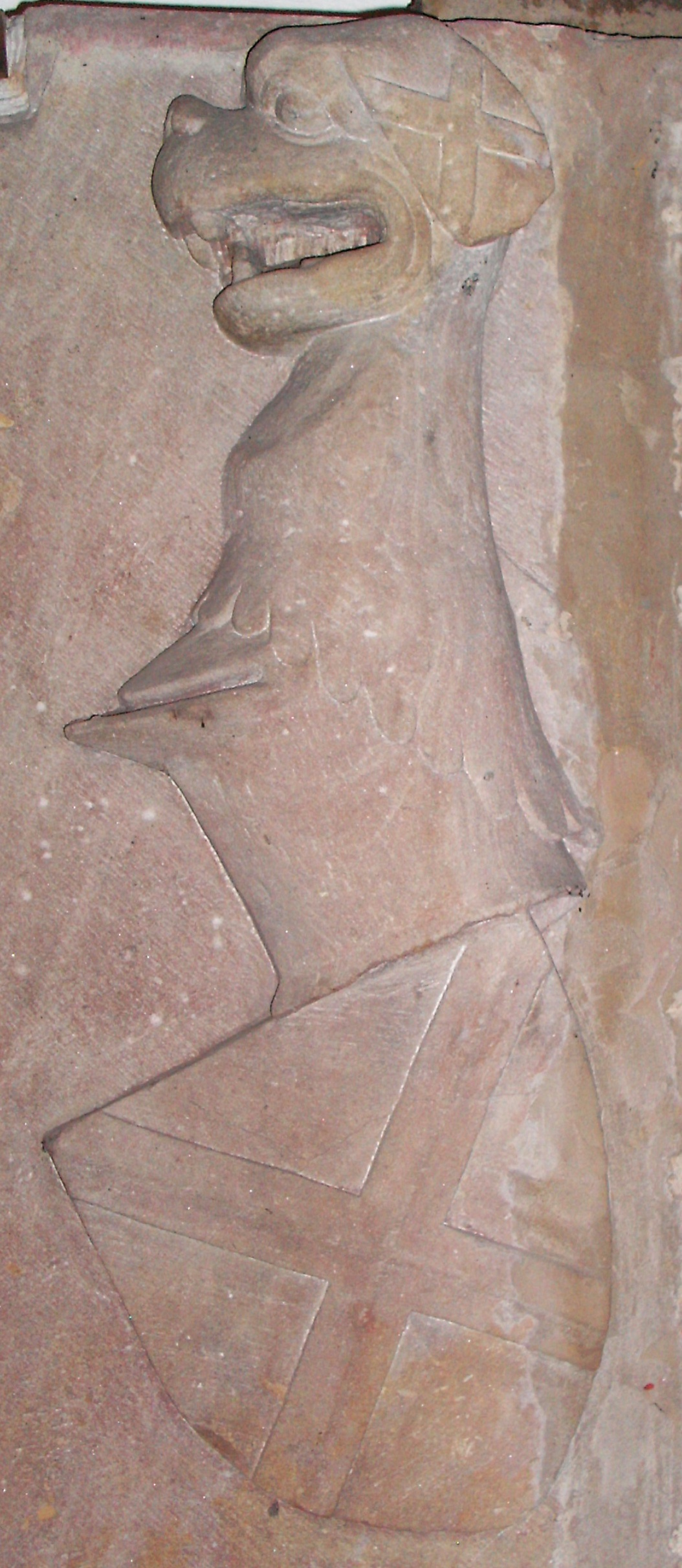
Contemporary family coat of arms from the epitaph of her grand niece Elisabeth of Oettingen (d. 1406), in the collegiate church in Neustadt an der Weinstrasse

Born in Worms, Germany, Irmengard of Oettingen was the daughter of Count Louis VI of Oettingen (1288–1346) and his wife Agnes of Württemberg (1295–1317), a daughter of Eberhard the Illustrious, of Württemberg.

In 1320 Princess Irmengard married Count Palatine Adolph "the Upright" of Wittelsbach. He was officially the Count Palatine of the Rhine from 1319 until his death in 1327. The actual power of government, however, was exercised by his uncle Louis IV.

The couple resided in Heidelberg under the suzerainty of Emperor Louis IV. In 1326, they retired to Oggersheim. This community had been destroyed by fire. Adolf led the rebuild and added a city wall and a moat and elevated the place to a city. Adolf died in January 1327 in Neustadt an der Weinstraße and was buried in the Cistercian Schönau Abbey.

Irmengard of Oettingen and Count Palatine Adolf had four children:

1. Rupert II, Elector Palatine of the Rhine (12 May 1325, Amberg – 6 January 1398, Amberg).
2. Adolf.
3. Frederick.
4. a daughter (d. 1389), married Count Meinhard I of Ortenburg.

=== Widow and nun ===
Still in the year of the death of her husband, countess Irmengard and her children retired into the Liebenau monastery in Worms. The Austria-minded Count John of Nassau was appointed as the children's guardian. The Treaty of Pavia (1329) between Emperor Louis IV and Adolf's brothers Electors Palatine Rudolf II and Rupert I was concluded, stipulating that Adolf's four-year-old son Rupert II would succeed his childless uncles as Count Palatine and Elector.

At first Irmengard of Oettingen had lived only as a guest in the monastery. Around 1347 she became a Dominican nun and lived as a nun until her death in 1389 (various sources also mention the year 1399). In Liebenau, she founded on 1 December 1381, a Mass to be sung daily, the so-called Convent Mass. Irmengard's brother Louis died in 1346 during a pilgrimage to the Holy Land. He had bequeathed the gift of a magnificent Cross to the Liebenau monastery, which, according to its inscription, had been commissioned by her father, Count Louis VI. The cross came to Freiburg im Breisgau in a roundabout way and is now among the special treasures of the local Augustiner Museum.

Irmengard's daughter-in-law Beatrix of Sicily would sometimes visit her in the monastery. The Dominican chronicler John Meyer (1422–1482) reports that Countess Palatine Beatrix gave birth to her son Rupert in the monastery and that he was brought up until age 7 by his grandmother Irmengard of Oettingen. Rupert later became Elector Palatine as Rupert III and King of the Germans as Rupert I. Irmengard's grand niece Elisabeth of Oettingen served Rupert as a lady in waiting.

Countess Palatine Irmengard died in 1389 and was interred in the Liebenau monastery in Worms. No trace of the monastery remains. The historian Johann Friedrich Schannat provides her grave inscription in his Historia episcopatus Wormatiensis on page 172. It states that the princess lived for 40 years as a nun.
