= Elisabeth of Oettingen =

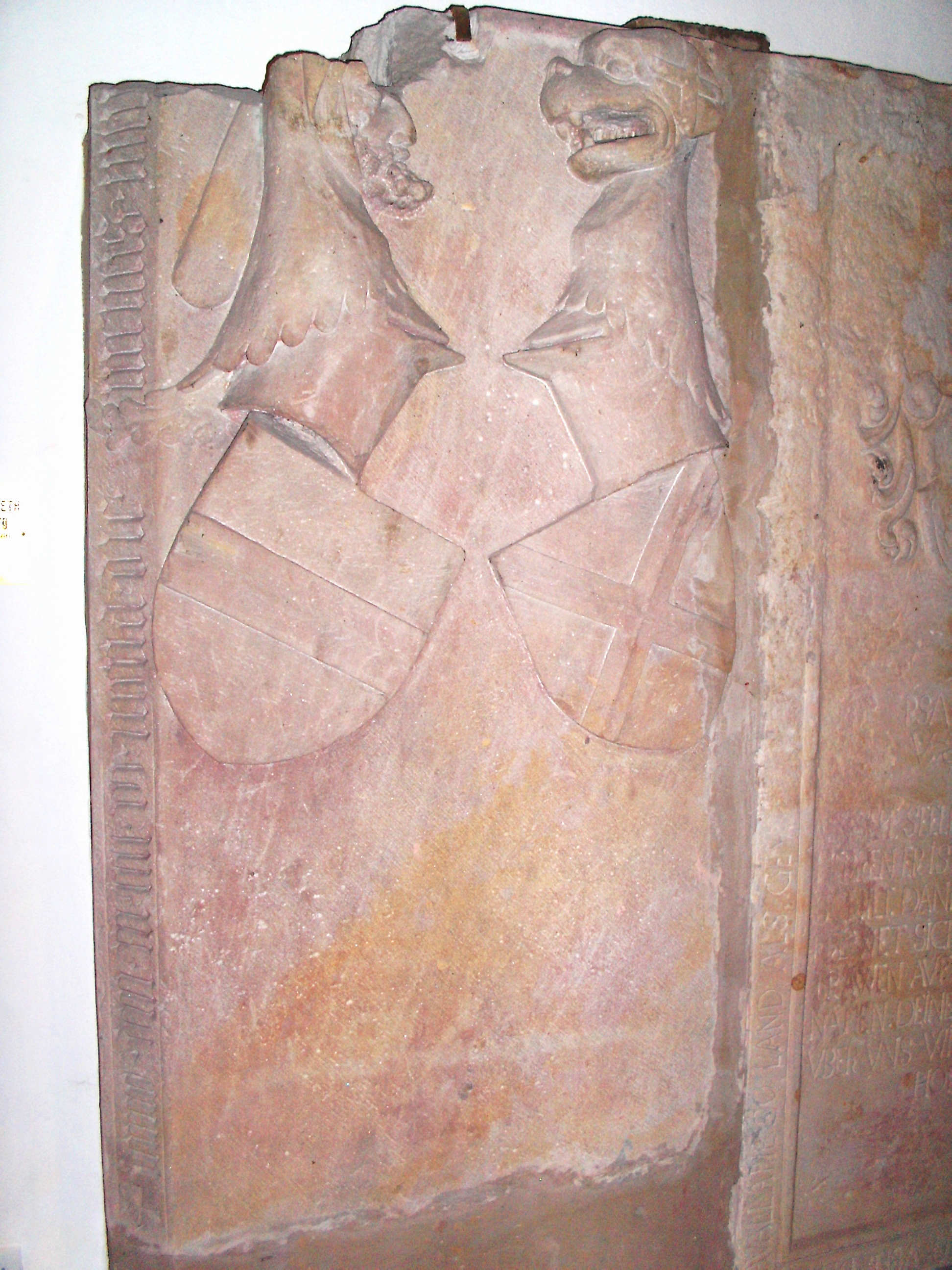
- Contemporary epitaph of Elizabeth of Oettingen, with the Oettingen family crest (right) and Leuchtenberg (left), in the St. Giles Church in Neustadt an der Weinstrasse
- Born: c. 1360
- Died: 9 July 1406
- Buried: St. Giles Church in Neustadt an der Weinstrasse
- Noble family: House of Oettingen-Wallerstein
- Spouse: Landgrave Albert of Leuchtenberg
- Father: Count Louis X of Oettingen
- Mother: Imagina of Schaunberg

Elisabeth of Oettingen also known as Elizabeth of Leuchtenberg (born: c. 1360; died: 9 July 1406) was a member of the House of Oettingen-Wallerstein by birth. She was a Landgravine of Leuchtenberg by marriage and a lady in waiting for the Elector Palatine and King of Germany, Rupert.

== Life ==
Elisabeth of Oettingen was the daughter of Count Louis X of Oettingen (referred to as Louis XI by some authors) (died: 1 May 1370) and his wife Imagina of Schaunberg (died: 1377). Around 1376, Elisabeth married Landgrave Albert of Leuchtenberg (died: c. 1398).

Little is known about her life. She served as a lady in waiting at the Palatine court. Irmengard of Oettingen, the cousin of her grandfather, Frederick I of Oettingen, was married to Elector Palatine Adolf and was the grandmother of Rupert, the Elector Palatine and King of Germany, so Elisabeth was a third cousin of King Rupert. She may have received her position at the Palatine court on the recommendation of her elderly great-aunt Irmengard, the elector's grandmother, who at the time lived as a Dominican nun in the Liebenau monastery at Worms.

Elisabeth donated a valuable collection of 52 relics in two silver containers to the collegiate church in Neustadt and der Haardt (now called Neustadt an der Weinstrasse). The relics were lost during the Reformation. Members of the House of Wittelsbach were buried in the choir of this church, and so was Elisabeth, who was a relative of the Wittelsbach family. Her damaged grave stone was found in 1907 in the church floor, near the northern entrance into the Catholic part of the church and is now part of the west wall of the south choir chapel. The church has an "eternal" tradition of celebrating mass in Elisabeth's memory; a contemporary record in the Seelbuch mentions the donation in connection with this mass.

Elisabeth's son Landgrave Leopold of Leuchtenberg (d. 1463) was a Palatinate governor of Amberg and was later raised to Prince of Leuchtenberg. This, too, may be due to his remote family connection with the king, or to the reputation of his mother. Leopold was buried in the parish church of Pfreimd in the Upper Palatinate. His grave is marked with a well-preserved magnificent marble epitaph with a portrait of Leopold as a knight. The portrait can be seen in the header of the parish's official website.

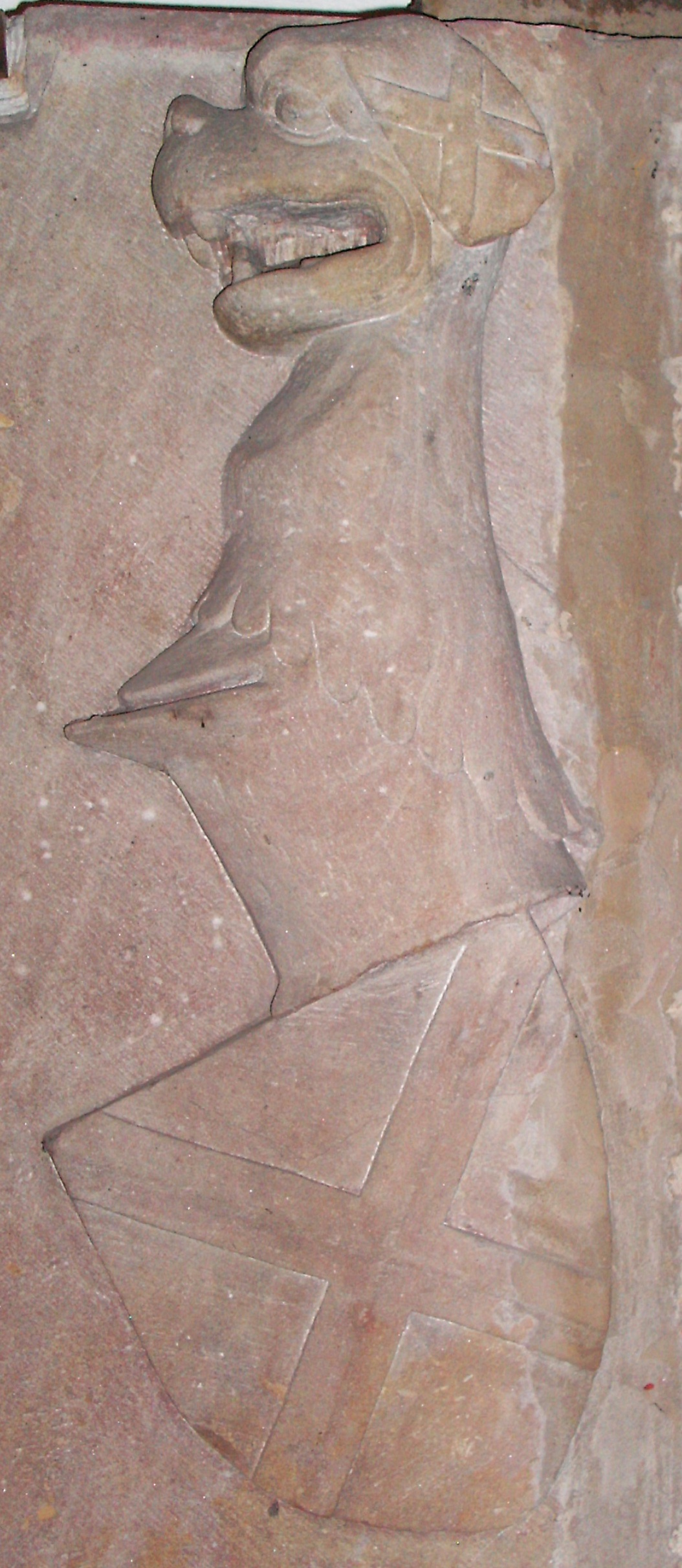
Oettingen family coat of arms, the epitaph in the St. Giles Church in Neustadt an der Weinstrasse

Elizabeth's brother, Frederick IV of Oettingen was bishop of Eichstätt. He was considered one of the most pious and most active German prelates of his time.

Her other brother, Louis XI "the Bearded" (he is called "Louis XII" by authors who call her father "Louis XI") served king of Sigismund for many years as Hofmeister and confidant. At the time, the Hofmeister was the highest official in the Emprire. He also represented the Emperor at the Council of Constance.
