= Liebenau monastery =

Dominican monastery

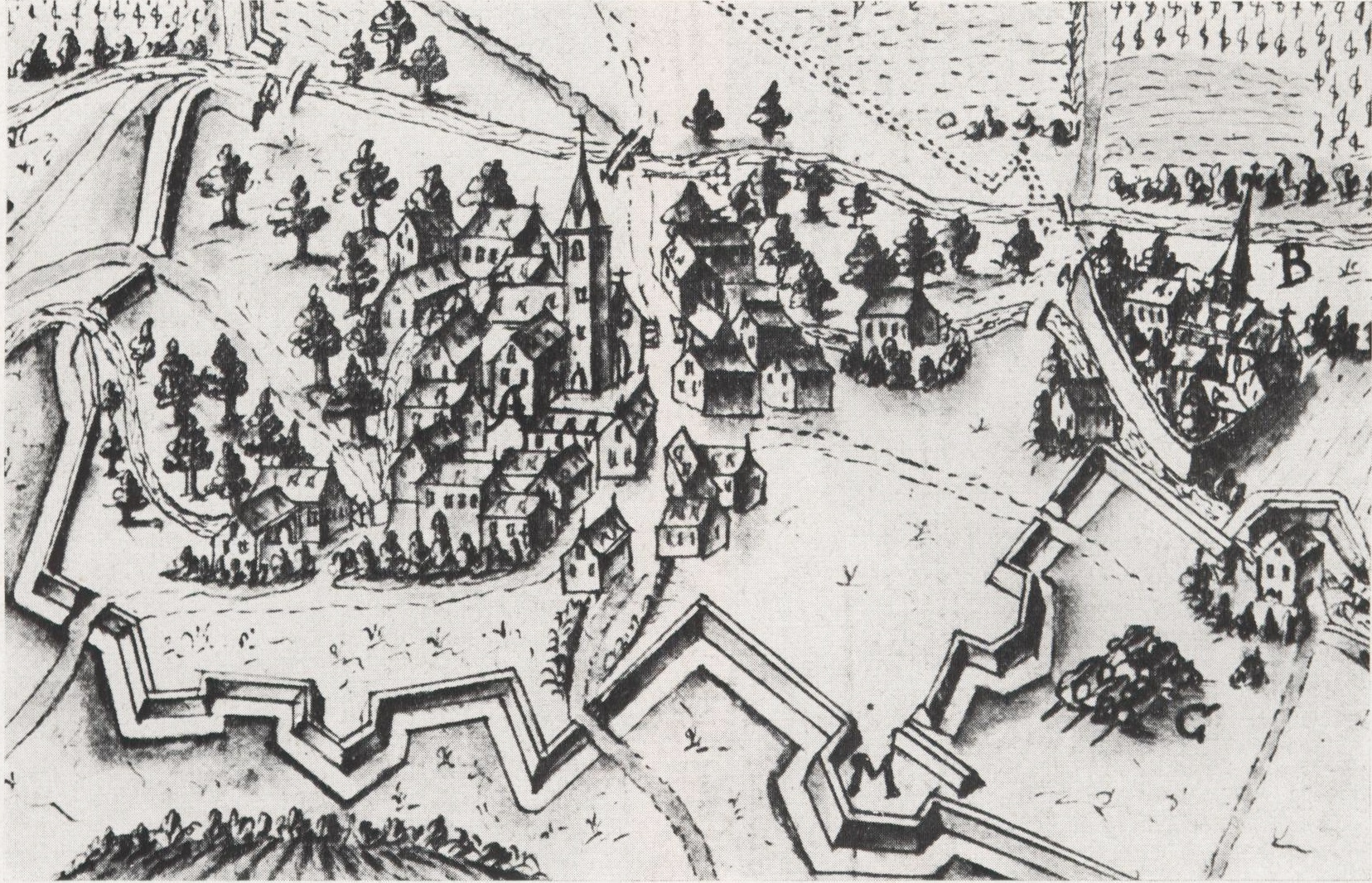
- St. Cyriacus abbey in Neuhausen ("A", in the center) and the Liebenau monastery in Hochheim ("B", on the right) in 1620, drawing in the Worms city archives (probably the only surviving picture)

- Location within Rhineland-Palatinate, Germany

Monastery information
- Order: Dominicans
- Established: 1299
- Disestablished: 1570

People
- Founders: Jacob and Lieba Engelmann

Site
- Location: Worms, Rhineland-Palatinate, Germany
- Coordinates: 49.635043°N 8.347808°E

The Liebenau monastery was a Dominican monastery. It was located outside the city gates of Worms in today's Worms-Hochheim district.

== Location ==
Liebenau was located in the east of Hochheim district, close to the border with the Neuhausen district, near the bridge across the Pfrimm and today's Von-Steuben-Straße. There are streets named Engelmannstraße and Holderbaumstraße in the area, named after the monastery's founders, Johann Engelmann and Lieba Holderbaum.

== History ==
The monastery Liebenau is closely linked to the nearby St. Cyriacus abbey in Worms-Neuhausen, which was disestablished in 1565. St. Cyriacus was very old and was probably originally a Franconian royal court. In 630, King Dagobert I converted it into a church dedicated to St. Denis. In the 9th century, Bishop Samuel of Worms (841-856), who was also abbot of Lorsch Abbey, acquired the relics of St. Cyriacus, one of the highly revered Fourteen Holy Helpers, in Rome and placed them in the church in Neuhausen, which soon adopted St. Cyriacus as its patron saint and was linked to a collegiate church. Thus, the church at Neuhausen became a pilgrimage destination.

Emperor Henry V, Holy Roman Emperor visited the abbey in 1111 and built a castle in the vicinity. This castle had a polygonal shield wall and was located slightly west of Neuhausen Abbey on a peninsula between the rivers Pfrimm and Mühlbach. The castle was damaged in 1124 and definitively destroyed in 1288, during a conflict between the city and the clergy. The site was acquired by Konrad Holderbaum, a citizen of Worms. Via his son Johann Holderbaum, the site came into the possession his sister Lieba, who had married Jacob Engelmann.

In 1299, Jacob and Lieba Engelmann found a nunnery at this site, on the condition that they would be buried in the nunnery. According to Johann Friedrich Schannat in his Historia episcopatus Wormatiensis of 1734, the name Liebenau is derived from the founder's first name Lieba. Eberwin von Kronenberg (d. 22 April 1308), the Bishop of Worms, laid the foundation stone in 1300 and also oversaw the completion of the building after the founders had died. The monastery owned the parish of Einselthum. Over time, the monastery acquired more territory. By the early 16th century, the monastery held possessions in Osthofen, Pfeddersheim, Alsheim, Einselthum, Westhofen, Gundersheim, Blödesheim, Eich, Hochheim, Leiselheim and Pfiffligheim.

In 1327, Count Palatine Adolph of the Rhine died and his widow, Irmengard of Oettingen moved into Liebenau monastery with her children. Initially, she lived in the convent as a guest In 1347, however, she became a Dominican nun. She lived in the monastery until she died in 1389 (some sources say 1399). On 1 December 1381, she founded the so-called Convent Mass, which was to be sung daily

Irmengard was buried in the monastery. The historian Johann Friedrich Schannat provides the inscription on her grave, which no longer exists, on 172 of his Historia episcopatus Wormatiensis. The inscription mentioned how the princess lived as a nun in the monastery for more than 40 years.

Irmengards brother Louis died in 1346, during a pilgrimage to the Holy Land. He had bequeathed the gift of a beautiful cross to the Liebenau monastery. According to the inscription, the cross had been commissioned by Irmengard's father, Count Louis VI of Oettingen. The cross came to Freiburg im Breisgau in a roundabout way and is now among the special treasures of the local Augustiner Museum.

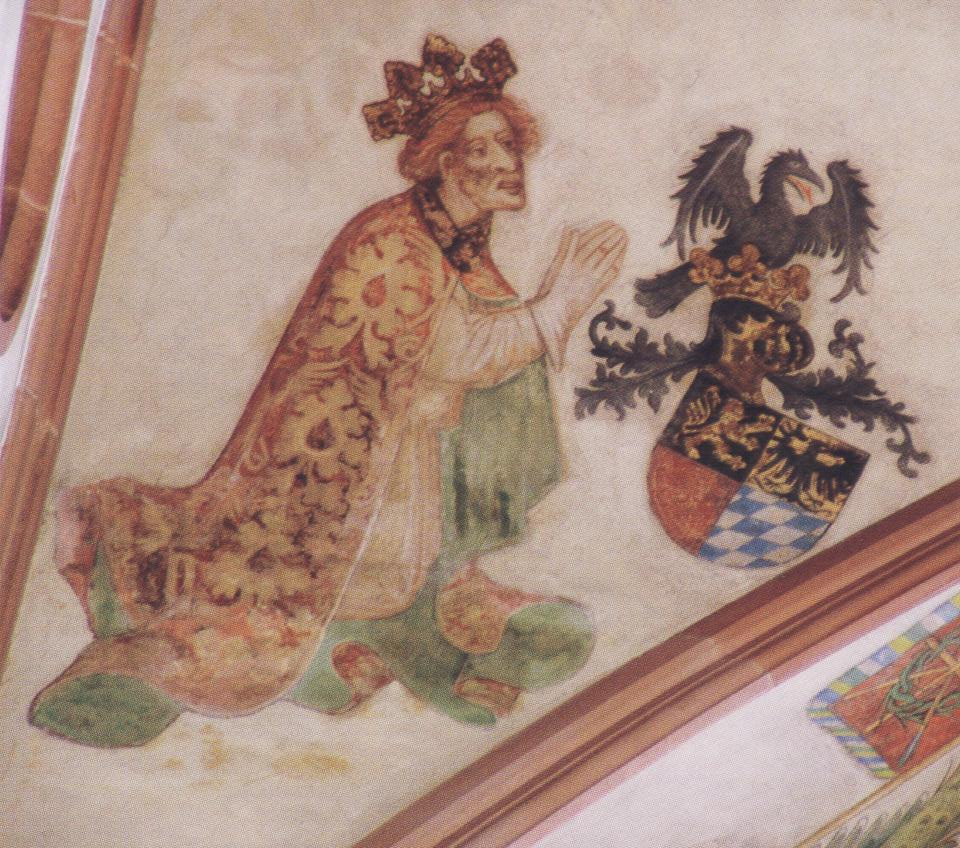
King Rupert grew up with his grandmother Irmengard of Oettingen at Liebenau monastery

Irmengard's daughter-in-law Beatrice of Aragon-Sicily would occasionally visit her mother-in-law. The Dominican chronicler Johannes Meyer (1422-1482) reports that during one of these visits, Beatrice gave birth to Rupert, who would be raised by Irmengard in Liebenau until age 7. Rupert would later become King of the Germans.

Margaret of the Palatinate, a disabled daughter of Elector Palatine Louis III, lived in the monastery as a lay sister from c. 1445. She was reported as having been very pious. She died on 24 November 1466. Her cousins Barbara (1439-1482) and Dorothea (1444-1486), daughters of Otto I, Count Palatine of Mosbach, were also nuns at Liebenau. Dorothea even served as prioress of the monastery.

The Liebenau monastery enjoyed the very special favour and affection of the Palatinate ruling family, because Irmengard and her princely relatives had resided there. This led many noble women and daughters of high-ranking citizens to become nuns at Liebenau. Among them was Irmengard of Nassau, née Princess of Hohenlohe-Weikersheim. She was a maternal cousin of Irmengard of Oettingen and the widow of Gerlach I, Count of Nassau, who had been a cousin of the late Count Palatine Adolph. Irmengard of Nassau died at Liebenau in January 1371, in the odor of sanctity as the Historical Society for Hesse puts it.

Noble ladies who resided at Liebenau included:

- Margaret of Württemberg, a daughter of Ulrich V, Count of Württemberg and Elisabeth of Bavaria
- Margaret of Hanau-Münzenberg (d. 1503), who was related to the Palatinate branch of the House of Wittelsbach, as her paternal grandmother Margaret of Mosbach was a sister of Barbara and Dorothea mentioned above.
- Else von Stromberg, an illegitimate daughter of Elector Palatine Rupert II, who was a nun at Liebenau from 1392.

In 1430, Elector Palatine Louis III asked the Dominican Petrus von Gengenbach to renew the monastic life at Liebenau. Petrus brought in nuns from Colmar and reinvigorated observance of Dominican monastic rules. Some noble nuns left the monastery, whereas others, mostly from the sphere of the Palatinate ruling family, entered the monastery. Petrus von Gengenbach died on 16 January 1452 and was buried at Liebenau. Johann Friedrich Schannat reports that the inscription on his grave called him a Dominican from Augsburg and reformer of the Monastery.

== Dissolution ==
During the Reformation, Elector Palatine Frederick III made three attempts to dissolve the monastery between 1561 and 1563. However, the nuns continued to resist dissolution. As early as 1560, they had complained to the Emperor about Protestants interfering with their religious practices. The Emperor had sent the Elector a letter, instructing him to at least give a Catholic confessor free access to the monastery.

After the failed attempt to dissolve in 1561, Elector Frederick III sent his officials to the monasteries of Himmelskron and Liebenau in May 1562. The officials were to explain the elector's gracious intentions to the nuns and to inform them that he, as their sovereign, fervently wished that they would "behave as obedient children and allow themselves to be educated about the pure divine message". They should refrain from singing Matins and other Latin hymns. The envoys did as they were ordered, however, the prioresses of both monasteries and their nuns remained steadfast. They met the envoys at the visitors' grid and left the meeting "with disgrace".

During the third attempt resolution on 16 March 1563, the Prioress received the envoys of the Elector after threats of violence. The envoys were received in a room, where all the residents of the monastery had gathered, 13 nuns and 9 lay sisters, all dressed in their religious attire. The envoys later reported:

We presented the letter from the Elector and explained his wishes. The Prioress then frankly declared that her parents had destined her for the monastery at an early age and she had entered the convent and that she would never betray the faith in which she had been raised and that she would not take off her religious attire and that she and her subordinates never left the convent and that her clothes therefore could not give offense and that she held their singing and reading and monastic rules for a laudable, Christian activity and that they could not accept a preacher and that they would not listen if one were provided, because they could not judge the many faiths that were proclaimed at the time. We could not persuade the prioress and in the end she told us, we should ask the nuns and lay sisters for their opinion and they unanimously declared that they would never forsake their faith and begged the Elector to leave them in peace.

— Archiv für hessische Geschichte und Altertumskunde, vol.2, 1841, p. 452-453

Some time later, Frederick III visited the monastery in person. He forced his way in and during his visit, punched through a painting of the crucifixion. In 1565, the Dominicans and their last prioress Anna von Seckendorff were expelled. They moved to Adelhausen monastery in Freiburg im Breisgau. At the Diet of Augsburg in 1566, Anna made her last attempt to save the monastery, however, she was unsuccessful.

In 1570, the Elector finally managed to seize the monasteries properties. They would be administered by the Electoral Department of Ecclesiastical Properties in Heidelberg, who leased out the properties. In later years, the buildings were converted or demolished and no trace of them remains.

== Miscellaneous ==
Countess Palatine Margaret of Savoy had a "dwarf" named Catherine at her court. After Margaret died in 1470, Catherine was cared for at Liebenau monastery

According to Johann Friedrich Schannat the 3-year-old Prince Adolph, son of Elector Rupert III was buried at Liebenau. According to his epitaph, he died on the Feast of Saints Philip and James, in 1358.

A Roman Catholic Church named St. Mary Himmelskron was preserved in the Hochheim district of Worms. However, this church did not belong to Liebenau, but to the neighbouring Dominican Himmelskron monastery.

During the 19th and 20th century, a leather factory named Heyl’sche Lederwerk Liebenau was located on the grounds of the former monastery. This factory was named after the monastery. Its owner, Baron Ludwig von Heyl zu Herrnsheim excavated the site in 1929 and extensively documented his finds.

A winery named Liebebauer Hof ("Court of Liebenau") still exists at Ludwig-Schwanb-Straße 22 in Osthofen. It is one of the oldest wineries in the region. It once belonged to the couple who founded Liebenau. According to a deed dated 2 April 1309, it was given to them by Johannes Holderbaum and his wife Matilda of Hischberg. This Johannes may have been Lieba's brother.
