= Mechthild of Nassau =

Child of King Adolf of the Romans, Duchess of Bavaria and Countess Palatine

- Mechthild, Duchess of Bavaria; Mechthild of Rhine, Countess Palatine
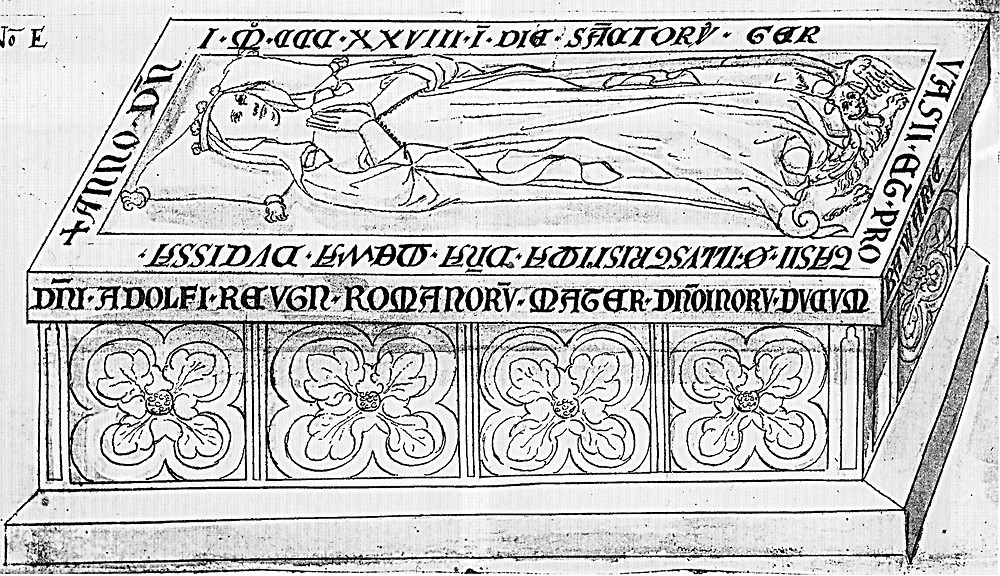
- Drawing of the tomb of Mechthild of Nassau in Klarenthal Monastery, by Heinrich Dors

Duchess of Bavaria; Countess Palatine
- Tenure: 1294–1317
- Predecessor: Matilda of Habsburg
- Successor: Beatrix of Świdnica
- Born: Mechthild von Nassau before 1280
- Died: 19 June 1323; Heidelberg, Electorate Palatinate, Holy Roman Empire, (present-day, Germany)
- Burial: Klarenthal Abbey
- Spouse: Rudolf I, Duke of Bavaria (m. 1294; died 1319)
- Issue: Ludwig; Adolf, Count Palatine of the Rhine; Rudolf II, Count Palatine of the Rhine; Rupert I, Elector Palatine; Mathilde, Countess of Sponheim; Anna
- House: Nassau (by birth); Wittelsbach (by marriage)
- Father: Adolf, King of the Romans
- Mother: Imagina of Isenburg-Limburg

Mechtild of Nassau (German: Mechthild von Nassau; before 1280–19 June 1323) was the youngest child of Adolf, King of the Romans and Imagina of Isenburg-Limburg. Through her marriage to Rudolf I, Duke of Bavaria, Mechthild was the Duchess of Bavaria and Countess Palatine.

== Family ==
Mechthild was the youngest of eight children, however only Mechthild and three other siblings lived to adulthood: Gerlach I of Nassau-Wiesbaden, Walram III of Nassau-Wiesbaden and Adelheid, Abbess of Klarenthal Abbey.

Rudolf succeeded his father in 1294 and supported his father-in-law king Adolf of Nassau-Weilburg against his uncle, the Habsburg Albert of Austria. After Adolf’s death Rudolf joined Albert’s party but the strong dynastic policy of the new king caused a new conflict. Rudolf's mother, Matilda of Habsburg acted as regent for her son Rudolf as well as her other son, the future Louis IV, Holy Roman Emperor. A civil war against Louis due to new disputes on the partition of Bavaria was ended in 1313, when peace was made at Munich. Rudolf died in 1319, in England.

Louis IV, Holy Roman Emperor had taken the Palatinate by force of arms. In August 1322, the war finally came to an end, but only after Mechtild's death in June 1323, when the three brothers finally were able to make peace with their uncle. Louis' sons inherited Bavaria and Rudolf and Mechtild's sons inherited the Upper Palatinate and the Palatinate in line with the Treaty of Pavia (1329).

Metchild died 19 June 1323 in Heidelberg. She was buried at Klarenthal Abbey.

== Marriage ==
She married in Nuremberg 1 September 1294 Rudolf I, Duke of Bavaria. John I of Isenburg-Limburg helped make the final agreement. Mechtild and Rudolf had:

1. Ludwig (1297 – before 5 April 1311)
2. Adolf, Count Palatine of the Rhine (27 September 1300, Wolfratshausen – 29 January 1327)
3. Rudolf II the Blind (8 August 1306, Wolfratshausen – 4 October 1353, Neustadt)
4. Rupert I the Red (9 June 1309, Wolfratshausen – 16 February 1390)
5. Mathilde (1312 – 25 November 1375), married 1330/1 to Count John III of Sponheim
6. Anna (1318–1319).

== Sources ==
- Herde, Peter (2000). "From Adolf of Nassau to Lewis of Bavaria, 1292-1347". In Jones, Michael (ed.). The New Cambridge Medieval History: c. 1300-c. 1415. Vol. VI. Cambridge University Press.
- Thomas, Andrew L. (2010). A House Divided: Wittelsbach Confessional Court Cultures in the Holy Roman Empire, 1550-1650. Brill.

| Preceded by Matilda of Habsburg | Duchess of Upper Bavaria; 1294–1317 | Succeeded by Beatrix of Świdnica (United Bavaria) |
