= Frederick IV of Oettingen =

Prince Bishop of Eichstätt

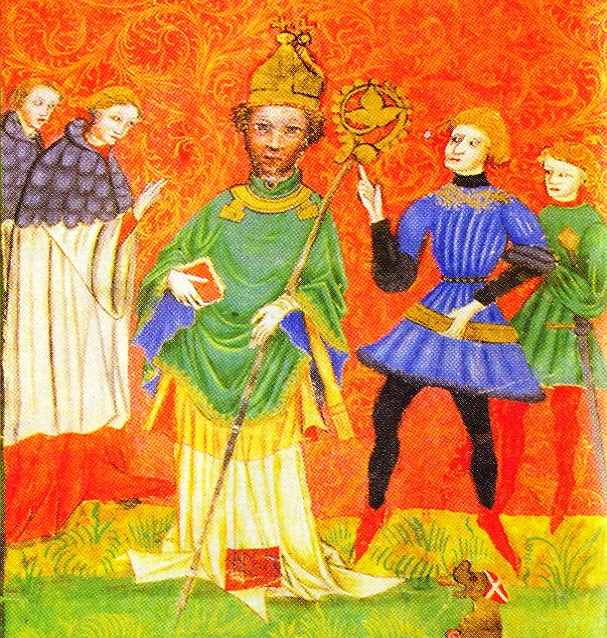
- Portrait of Frederick IV of Oettingen in the Pontifikale Gundekarianum
- Born: 1360
- Died: 19 September 1415; Eichstätt
- Buried: Willibald choir of the cathedral in Eichstätt
- Noble family: House of Oettingen
- Father: Count Louis X of Oettingen
- Mother: Imagina of Schaumberg

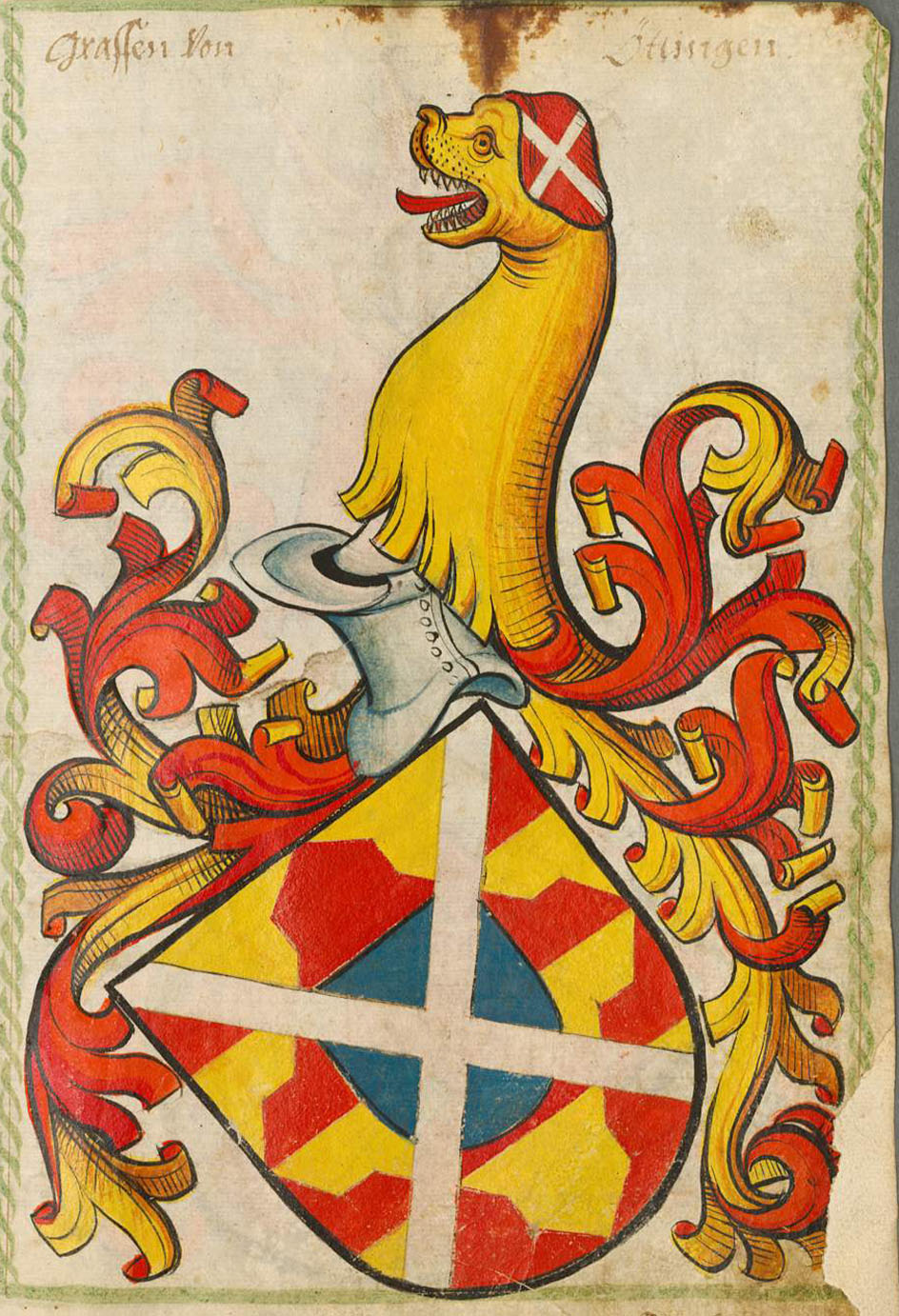
Oettingen family crest in the Scheibler armorial

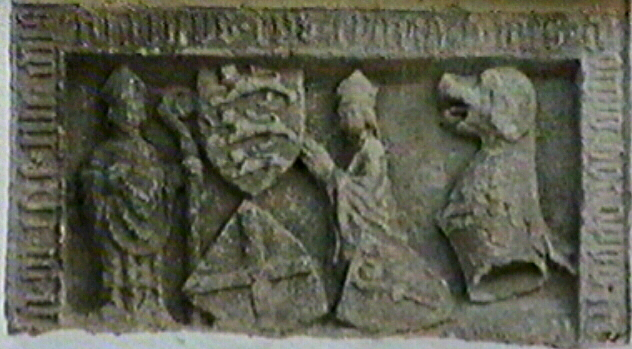
Depiction of the bishop's construction activities Mörnsheim, on a door

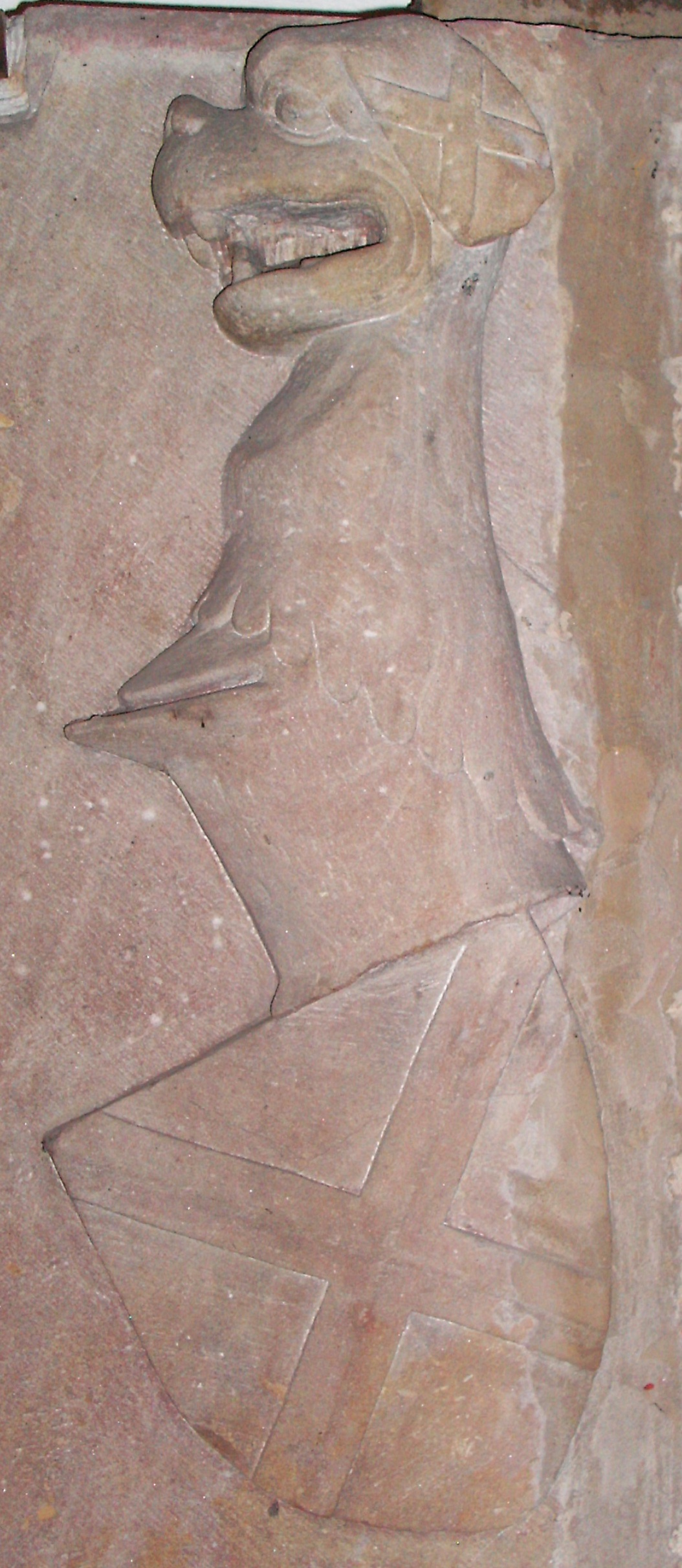
Oettingen family crest, from his sister's epitaph in the Collegiate Church in Neustadt an der Weinstraße

Count Frederick IV of Oettingen (d. 19 September 1415 in Eichstätt) was archbishop of Eichstätt from 1383 until his death.

== Background ==
Frederick IV of Oettingen was a member of the Swabian-Franconian House of Oettingen. He was the son of Louis X of Oettingen and Imagina of Schaumberg. His brother Louis XI served as chamberlain of Emperor Sigismund. His relative Siegfried of Oettingen served briefly as Bishop of Bamberg in 1237.

== Life ==
Frederick IV studied canon law and theology in Padua and Bologna. He then served as canon in Eichstätt and Würzburg. He was elected bishop of Eichstätt in 1383. Since he was only 23 years old at the time, he needed a papal dispensation to take up his post. He received this dispensation from Pope Urban VI and was invested as bishop by Emperor Wenceslaus in February 1385.

According to the chronicle written by Wilhelm Werner von Zimmern in 1550, Frederick loved beautiful horses and spent lavishly on his own court and thrifty on other business.

Early in his reign, his bishopric was dominated by feuds, conflicts and robber barons. The upper end of the bishopric, around Herrieden was the hardest hit: it suffered from a war between the local princes and the Swabian League of Cities. Frederick joined the league in 1383. However, he later changed sides and supported the princes; the League responded by invading his bishopric. Frederick was successful against the robber barons and against local nobleman who incursed on the bishop's rights. He managed to end the feuds between the bishopric and the noble families of Absberg, Abensberg, Schwarzberg and Seckendorff and with the Burgraviate of Nuremberg. In 1408, he defeated William of Bebenburg and executed 22 prisoners. After that, there were no more invasions of Franconian noblemen into his bishopric.

Frederick also fought heretics, in particular Waldensians. He executed ten of them in 1394 in Wemding, after a strenuous trial.

The Gundekarianum reports that his financial and acquisition policy were quite successful. His purchases included Brunneck Castle in the Anlauter valley, Sandsee Castle, Thannhausen Castle, a share of Wahrberg Castle and a number of manors. He spent 18000guilders on construction projects, most of it on building and expanding fortresses, such as Willibaldsburg Castle in Eichstätt, Reichenau Castle, Hirschberg Castle, Mörnsheim Castle, Nassenfeld Castle, Arberg Castle and Kipfenberg Castle. He also continued the work on the nave of the Cathedral in Eichstätt, which was consecrated on 13 October 1396. He also built an iron works in Obereichstätt.

Frederick attempted to reform his clergy. He provided strong leadership and financed the purchase of liturgical books. He held a diocesan synod every year. He reformed the collegiate canons in Spalt. He promoted the worship of the Eucharist and to this end introduced a Corpus Christi procession in Eichstätt. He donated a monstrance to the cathedral and carried it himself in an annual procession.

He died in 1415, at the age of 55. He was buried in the Willibald choir of the cathedral in Eichstätt, where he had donated an altar dedicated to Saint Barbara, whom he revered highly.

His sister Elisabeth of Oettingen (d. 9 July 1406) was a lady-in-waiting at the court of Elector Palatine and later King Rupert III. Her grave, with a magnificent epitaph showing the coat of arms of the House of Oettingen, has been preserved in the Collegiate Church in Neustadt an der Weinstraße.

== Footnotes ==
Frederick IV of Oettingen House of Oettingen Born: 1360 Died: 19 September 1415
Preceded by Raban Truchseß of Wilburgstetten	Bishop of Eichstätt; 1383-1415	Succeeded by John II of Heideck
