= Rudolf I of Bavaria =

Duke of Upper Bavaria (1274-1319)

Rudolf I "the Stammerer"
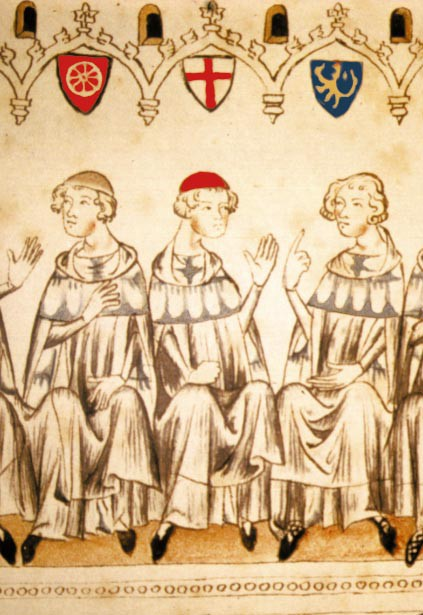
- The Prince-electors voting for Henry VII: Rudolf on the right, identified by the Palatinate Lion; excerpt from the Chronicle of Henry VII (Balduineum), 1341

Duke of Upper Bavaria Count Palatine of the Rhine
- Reign: 2 February 1294 – 1317
- Predecessor: Louis II, Duke of Bavaria
- Successor: Louis IV, Holy Roman Emperor
- Born: 4 October 1274; Basel, Prince-Bishopric of Basel
- Died: 12 August 1319 (aged 44); Kingdom of England(?)
- Spouse: Mechtild of Nassau
- Issue: Ludwig; Adolf, Count Palatine of the Rhine; Rudolf II, Duke of Bavaria; Rupert I, Elector Palatine; Mathilde; Anna
- House: House of Wittelsbach
- Father: Louis II, Duke of Bavaria
- Mother: Matilda of Habsburg

Rudolf I of Bavaria, called "the Stammerer" (German: Rudolf der Stammler; 4 October 1274 – 12 August 1319), a member of the Wittelsbach dynasty, was Duke of Upper Bavaria and Count Palatine of the Rhine from 1294 until 1317.

== Life ==
Rudolf was born in Basel, the son of Duke Louis II, Duke of Upper Bavaria and his third wife Matilda of Habsburg, a daughter of King Rudolf I of Germany. Since the 1255 partition of the Wittelsbach territories, his father ruled over the Electoral Palatinate and Upper Bavaria with his residence at Alter Hof in Munich and Heidelberg Castle, while his younger brother Duke Henry XIII ruled over the lands of Lower Bavaria.

As the eldest surviving son, Rudolf succeeded his father as Duke of Upper Bavaria upon his death in February 1294. In September he married Mechtild of Nassau, daughter of King Adolf of Germany, thereby continuing the marriage politics of his father. However, King Adolf dashed the Princes' expectations and in 1298 was declared deposed in favour of late King Rudolf's son and heir Duke Albert of Austria. In the Battle of Göllheim, Rudolf supported his father-in-law Adolf against his maternal uncle Albert. The Habsburg duke won the fight, while the king was killed in battle.

Albert was elected on 27 July 1298 and Rudolf then joined the Habsburg party, however, the strong dynastic policy of the new king caused led to a resurgence of the Wittelsbach dynastic conflicts. In 1301 King Albert put pressure on Rudolf to accept his ambitious younger brother Louis IV, the future Holy Roman Emperor, as co-regent. He broke Rudolf's remaining resistance by laying siege to his Heidelberg residence in 1301.

After Albert's assassination in 1308, both Rudolf and Louis hoped to become his successor. Nevertheless, the Princes around the mighty Archbishop of Mainz, Peter von Aspelt, arranged the candidacy of the Luxembourg count Henry VII. In the election on 27 November Rudolf voted for Henry. In 1310 he accompanied the new king on his campaign to Italy. However, he had to terminate his participation when upon the death of Duke Stephen I of Bavaria new disputes on the partition of the Wittelsbach lands and the electoral dignity between Rudolf and Louis IV culminated in a civil war.

Finally on 21 June 1313, peace between the brothers was made at Munich: while Rudolf retained the Electoral Palatinate, the treaty provided Louis with the opportunity to secure his election as German king when Henry of Luxembourg died on 24 August. Much to the annoyance of his brother, Louis was able to defeat his Habsburg rival Frederick the Fair at the Battle of Gammelsdorf on 9 November. After the renunciation of Henry's son King John of Bohemia, he finally was elected King of the Romans in Frankfurt on 20 October 1314 – against the vote of his envious brother Rudolf, who supported Frederick of Habsburg.

In the following throne quarrel with the Habsburgs, Rudolf was attacked by his brother in both Bavaria and the Palatinate. Put on the defensive, Rudolf in 1317 agreed to give up his rule in favour of Louis, until the conflict with the Habsburg rival was ended. According to the Renaissance historian Johannes Aventinus (1477–1534), Rudolf proceeded to England where he died two years later. He later received the epithet "the Stammerer" due to his many desperate fights against his capable younger brother.

Louis IV, crowned Holy Roman Emperor in 1328, by the 1329 Treaty of Pavia granted the Electoral Palatinate to late Rudolf's sons Rudolf II the Blind and Rupert I and Rudolf's grandson Rupert II, a son of Adolf. This way finally Rudolf I and his grandson Rupert II became the ancestors of the elder (Palatinate) line of the Wittelsbach dynasty, which returned to power also in Bavaria in 1777 after the extinction of the younger (Bavarian) line, the descendants of Louis IV.

== Family and children ==
Rudolf was married on 1 September 1294 to Mechtild of Nassau, daughter of King Adolf of Germany. The couple had the following children:

1. Ludwig (1297 – before 5 April 1311)
2. Adolf, Count Palatine of the Rhine (27 September 1300, Wolfratshausen – 29 January 1327), married Countess Irmengard of Oettingen (d. 1389) in 1320
3. Rudolf II, Duke of Bavaria (8 August 1306, Wolfratshausen – 4 October 1353, Neustadt), married Anne of Gorizia-Tyrol (1300–1335), daughter of Duke Otto III of Carinthia, in 1328; secondly married Margaret of Aragon (1331–1377), daughter of King Frederick III of Sicily, in 1348
4. Rupert I, Elector Palatine (9 June 1309, Wolfratshausen – 16 February 1390), married Elizabeth of Dampierre (1329–1382), daughter of Marquis John I of Namur, in 1328; secondly married Beatrice of Jülich (1360–1395), daughter of Duke William of Berg, in 1385
5. Mathilde (1312 – 25 November 1375), married Count John III of Sponheim in 1330
6. Anna (1318–1319).

== Sources ==
- Thomas, Andrew L. (2010). A House Divided: Wittelsbach Confessional Court Cultures in the Holy Roman Empire, c. 1550-1650. Brill.

Rudolf I of Bavaria House of Wittelsbach Born: 1274 Died: 1319
Regnal titles
Preceded by Louis II	Duke of Upper Bavaria; Count Palatine of the Rhine; 1294–1317	Succeeded by Louis IV
