= Beatrice of Sicily (1326–1365) =

Sicilian princess

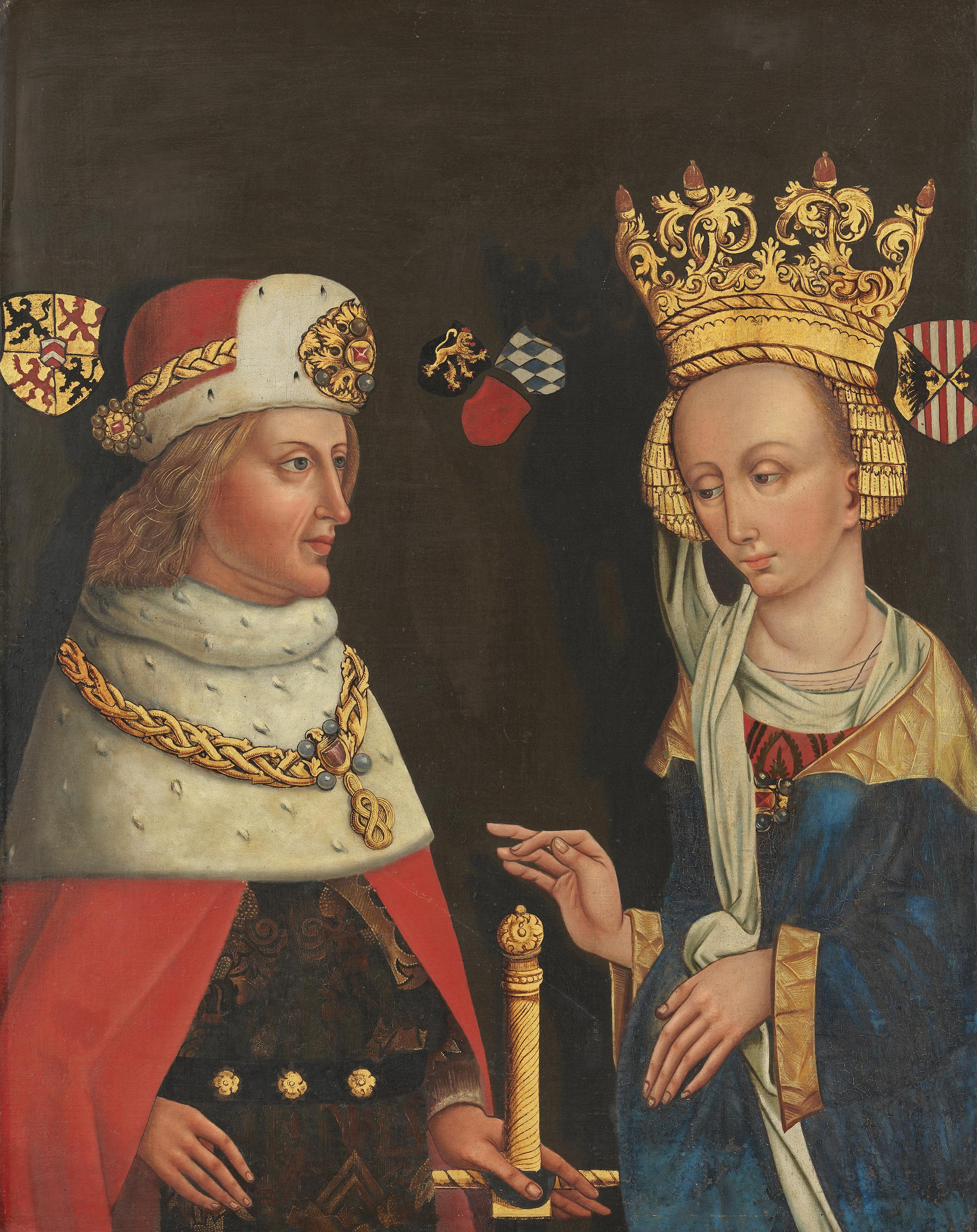
- Beatrice (right) with her husband, Rupert II
- Born: 5 September 1326; Palermo, Sicily
- Died: 12 October 1415 (aged 89)
- Burial: Schönau Abbey
- Spouse: Rupert II, Elector Palatine
- Issue Detail: Rupert, King of the Romans
- House: House of Barcelona
- Father: Peter II of Sicily
- Mother: Elisabeth of Carinthia

Beatrice of Sicily (5 September 1326 – 12 October 1365) was the daughter of Peter II of Sicily and Elisabeth of Carinthia. She was born into the House of Barcelona.

== Family ==
Beatrice was the third of eight children, all of them living to adulthood apart from one sister, Violente. Beatrice's siblings included: Frederick III the Simple, Euphemia, Constance (both regents of Sicily), Eleanor, wife of Peter II of Aragon, Louis of Sicily, and Blanche, Countess of Ampurias.

Beatrice's paternal grandparents were Frederick III of Sicily and Eleanor of Anjou, daughter of Charles II of Naples and Maria of Hungary; maternal grandparents were Otto III of Carinthia and his wife Euphemia of Legnica, daughter of Henry V, Duke of Legnica and Elisabeth of Kalisz.

== Life ==
Beatrice's parents resided in Palermo, where Beatrice was likely born.

In 1335, she was betrothed to John Henry IV of Gorizia, a cousin twice removed of her mother's. Her mother renounced her rights to Tyrol and Carinthia on Beatrice's behalf. However, the betrothal was cancelled by John Henry's mother who decided to settle with the new Habsburg rulers of Carinthia instead.

In 1345, Beatrice married Rupert, Count Palatine of the Rhine from the House of Wittelsbach. They needed a papal dispensation in order to marry. Rupert supported his uncle Prince Elector Rupert I actively with the Government of the Palatinate and was constantly on the move. Beatrice's mother-in-law Irmengard of Oettingen lived as a nun in the convent at Worms. Beatrice spent a lot of time here whilst her husband was away.

Beatrice and Rupert had the following children:

1. Anna (1346 – 30 November 1415), married in 1363 to Duke Wilhelm VII of Jülich and Berg
2. Friedrich (1347 – c. 1395)
3. Johann (1349 – c. 1395)
4. Mechthild (born 1350), married to Landgrave Sigost of Leuchtenberg
5. Elisabeth (c. 1351 – 1360)
6. King Rupert of Germany (1352–1410)
7. Adolf (1355 – 1 May 1358)

Beatrice died on 12 October 1415, . She was buried in the Cistercian monastery of Schönau near Heidelberg. The House of Wittelsbach founded the Collegiate Church in memory for Beatrice.
