= Beatrix of Berg =

Electress Palatine from 1385 to 1390

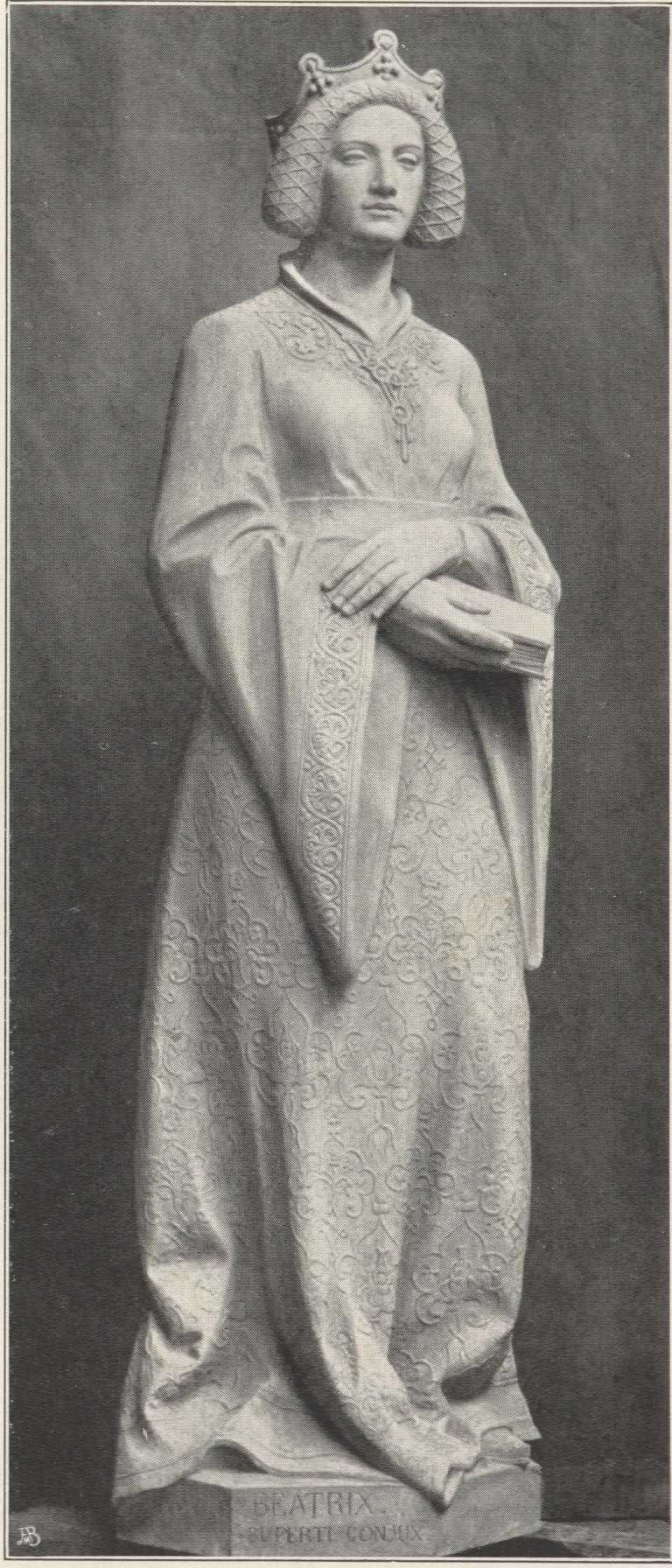
Beatrix of Berg in a 1910 statue by Hubert Netzer

Beatrix (Beatrice) of Berg (1364 in Burg on the Wupper – 16 May 1395 in Neustadt an der Weinstrasse) was the daughter of Duke William II of Berg and Electress of the Palatinate by marriage to her great granduncle Rupert I, Elector Palatine.

== Life ==
Beatrix was the daughter of Duke Wilhelm II of Berg and his wife Anna von Wittelsbach, daughter of the Rupert II, Elector Palatine. She was probably born in Burg Castle on the Wupper, at that time the residence of her parents.

From 1380 her father ruled in Dusseldorf as Duke of Berg, where the unmarried Beatrix most likely stayed with the parents.

In 1385 Beatrix married the widowed Elector Rupert I von der Pfalz, who had been widowed for 5 years, and who was already 75 years old. Beatrix was the granddaughter of his nephew and successor Rupert II.

Elector Rupert I and his second wife Beatrix both resided in Heidelberg, whose university was founded by the Elector, and in Neustadt an der Weinstrasse, where he died in 1390.

In the Allgemeine Deutsche Biographie it is said about the husband of Beatrix:

Even among his contemporaries Rupprecht I stood in high esteem, he was also a respectful figure, knightly in appearance. With reckless energy he was considered a benevolent gentleman of good will, a patron of the Church and the priesthood, a friend of widows and orphans. The Jewish community, whose financial power he knew how to exploit admirably, honored him as a just, humane protector."

Beatrix of Berg survived her husband by only 5 years and died in 1395 also in Neustadt. The marriage produced no offspring. The Palatinate was willed to her grandfather Rupert II, the nephew of her deceased husband.

Her husband left Beatrix as a widow's portion the castle and city of Neuburg am Rhein, as well as the village of Hagenbach and taxes in kind of Bergzabern.
