= Gerlach VI of Isenburg-Limburg =

Gerlach VI of Isenburg-Limburg (died 1365), also known as Gerlach III of Limburg, was Count of Isenburg-Limburg and Lord of Limburg an der Lahn. He succeeded his father Gerlach V in 1355. In 1356, he married Elisabeth of Falkenstein (died between 1364 and 1366).

In 1365, Gerlach III died in the Black Death without male heirs. With the permission of Pope Urban V, his brother John put aside the office of Canon of Trier Cathedral and took over the rule of Limburg as John II.

== Sources ==
- von Wolfhagen, Tilemann Elhen (2003). Peter Jentzmik (ed.). Eine wohlbeschriebene Chronick von der Stadt und den Herren zu Limpurg auff der Lahn (An Annotated Chronicle of the City and the Lords of Limburg on the Lahn) (in German) (2nd ed.). Limburg: Glaukos Verlag. ISBN 3-930428-19-9.(Unchanged reprint of the baroque 1720 edition from Verlag Winckler, Wetzlar).
- Großmann, G. Ulrich (2000). Limburg an der Lahn, Führer durch die Stadt und ihre Geschichte (Limburg an der Lahn, leaders of the city and its history) (in German) (5th ed.). Marburg: Trautvetter & Fischer. ISBN 3-87822-114-2..

Preceded by:	Gerlach VI	Succeeded by:
Gerlach V	Count of Isenburg-Limburg; 1355–1365	John II
