= John II of Isenburg-Limburg =

John II of Isenburg-Limburg was Lord of Limburg an der Lahn and the last Count of Isenburg-Limburg from 1365 until 1406. He is sometimes designated John III to differentiate him from his non-ruling older half-brother John II (died before 1353).

He was the third son of Count Gerlach V of Isenburg-Limburg from his second marriage (fourth altogether). His mother was Kunigunde of Wertheim. His eldest brother, Gerlach VI of Isenburg-Limburg, had died in the Black Death without male heirs in 1365, and his next oldest brother Hermann had died the same year. With the permission of Pope Urban V, John put aside the office of Canon of Trier Cathedral and took over the rule of Limburg as John II.

Gerlach V had pledged the Lordship of Limburg an der Lahn to the Archbishopric of Trier between 1344 and 1346. In 1374 Limburg’s imperial sovereignty also fell to Trier.

After John's death without heirs in 1406, the House of Isenburg-Limburg was extinct. Limburg was then annexed by Trier. The Archbishop at the time was Werner of Falkenstein.

== Marriage and children ==
He married Hildegard (died 1419) of Saarwerden (a former countship centered at present-day Sarre-Union, France). The couple had two daughters:

- Kunigunde (died before 15 March 1403); in 1401, married Count Adolf I of Nassau-Siegen (1362–1420).
- Klara (1388–1401)

== Sources ==
- Großmann, G. Ulrich (2000). Limburg an der Lahn, Führer durch die Stadt und ihre Geschichte (Limburg an der Lahn, leaders of the city and its history) (in German) (5th ed.). Marburg: Trautvetter & Fischer. ISBN 3-87822-114-2..

| Preceded by: | John II | Succeeded by: |
|---|---|---|
| Gerlach VI | Count of Isenburg-Limburg; 1365 - 1406 | extinct to Trier |
