= Samuel of Worms =

9th-century bishop of Worms

Samuel's name (second from top) in the list of Lorsch monks in the Reichenau confraternity book

Samuel (died 7 February 856) was the abbot of Lorsch and bishop of Worms from 837 or 838 until his death.

The twelfth-century Chronicon Laureshamense claims that Samuel was raised from childhood at Lorsch. The future bishop of Worms may be the same person as the monk of Fulda named Samuel who was educated under Alcuin at Saint Martin's of Tours and there befriended Hrabanus Maurus, who dedicated seven poems to him. The equation of the two Samuels, however, is not proved.

The future bishop of Worms is first mentioned as a monk of Lorsch, listed immediately after Abbot Adalung, in the Reichenau confraternity book begun in 824. When Adalung died on 24 August 837, Samuel was elected to succeed him. Sometime between his election as abbot and 24 February 838, he was elected bishop of Worms. He did not relinquish his abbey, but held both ecclesiastical charges until his death.

In the Carolingian civil war of 840–843, he took the side of the Emperor Lothair I. He was only finally reconciled with King Louis of East Francia—in whose kingdom his diocese and monastery lay after the treaty of Verdun—in 847. Nevertheless, the two did not work together. Louis did not visit Worms during Samuel's lifetime. In 847, Samuel consecrated the chapel of the monastery of Saint Cyriacus in Neuhausen, which he had founded. In 852, he rebuilt the cathedral of Worms.

Samuel died on 7 February 856 and was buried in Lorsch. His surviving epitaph is a later composition. In 1273, his bones were relocated to Neuhausen.
