= John I of Isenburg-Limburg =

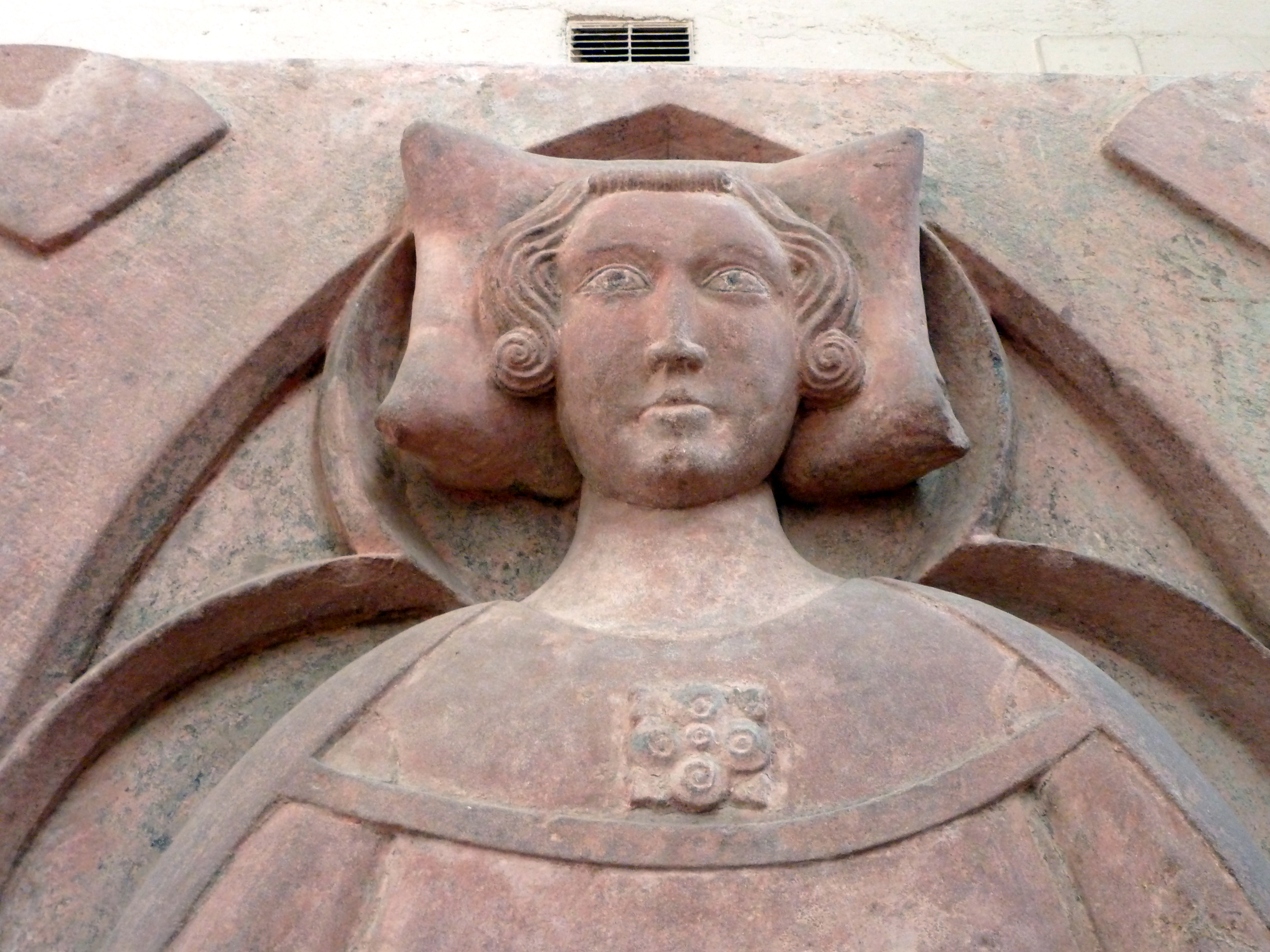
John I of Isenburg-Limburg

John I of Isenburg-Limburg, "The blind Lord" (died September 29, 1312) was from 1289 Count of (Isenburg-) Limburg and the head of the House of Limburg. The core territory of the Lordship of Limburg consisted of the city of Limburg an der Lahn and several surrounding villages.

In the City Chronicle of Limburg by Tilemann Elhen von Wolfhagen, written before 1402, John was referred to as the "Blind Lord." What is this name means, however, is unclear, because no sources refer to John being physically blind. Probably John had an eye disease in his old age and was thereby visually impaired.

== Life ==
John’s father, Gerlach I of Limburg, had founded the House of Limburg and sought to secure dynastic connections with neighboring noble families. John’s sister Imagina was married with the Count, later King of Germany, Adolf of Nassau. His second sister Agnes was married to Henry of Westerburg, the brother of the Siegfried II of Westerburg, the Archbishop of Cologne.

In 1288 John participated in the Battle of Worringen on the side of Siegfried of Westerburg. After the death of his father in the Black Forest on a military campaign of King Rudolph I of Habsburg, John inherited Lordship of Limburg.

John maintained a particularly close relationship to his brother-in-law, Adolf of Nassau. He served as godparent for Adolf's children. After Adolf’s election as king, John was a regular and active supporter and rose to become one of his advisors. He sealed the 1292 pledge of the imperial portion of the city of Limburg to the Archbishopric of Cologne. In the following years, he repeatedly sealed deeds of the king, and sealed the document as a witness for King Edward I of England in his agreement with Adolf. John was delegated to arrange the marriage between Adolf’s son Robert of Nassau and Agnes, the daughter of the King Wenceslaus II of Bohemia. He was also involved in concluding of the marriage contract between Duke Rudolph I of Upper Bavaria and Matilda (Mechtilde) of Nassau (King Adolf's daughter).

On July 2, 1298 John participated in the Battle of Göllheim on the side of Adolf of Nassau. Nevertheless, after the battle, he was able to win the favor of Adolf’s opponent, the new King Albert I of Habsburg. In 1303, Albert commissioned him to look for fiefs that had been wrongly taken from the empire and recover them.

The children of Otto I of Nassau designated John to act as arbitrator in the division of Otto’s inheritance in 1308.

John also worked diligently in his town of Limburg. Near the beginning of his reign, after a great fire destroyed the entire city of Limburg on May 14, 1289, John led a successful reconstruction effort. Already by around 1300 the city had outgrown its walls. John was probably responsible for the construction of the bridge over the Lahn at Limburg, the construction of the church of the Franciscan Monastery, and the founding of the Wilhelmiten monastery. Even the construction of St. Peter's Chapel in Limburg Castle goes back to him.

John died on September 29, 1312. He was buried in the Franciscan church of Limburg. His grave stone is still preserved today.

== Marriages and Children ==
John was married twice and it is unclear which children should be assigned to each marriage. His first marriage was to Elizabeth of Geroldseck (near Strasbourg), daughter of Henry of Geroldseck, Count of Veldenz and Elizabeth of Lichtenberg. With her he probably had the following children:

- Elizabeth (died after October 27, 1351); married first ca. 1303 to Baron Ulrich I of Bickenbach (now part of Engelskirchen) (died 1339); remarried before June 24, 1340 to Count John II of Katzenelnbogen (died March 2, 1357)
- Lisa; married before 1300 to Count Henry III of Solms-Braunfels (died after February 22, 1314)

His second marriage was to Uda of Ravensberg. This marriage probably accounted for the following children:

- Gerlach II "The Elder"
- John, listed 1373/79
- Jutta, listed 1330/35; married Count Friedrich VI of Leiningen-Dagsburg (died 1342)
- Maria, abbess of Altenberg Abbey in Wetzlar (1343–1349)
- Imagina (died 1337/43); her first marriage was to Count Ulrich of Truhendingen (from present-day Wassertrüdingen) before 1302; her second marriage was to Count Louis VIII of Oettingen before August 14, 1332.

== Sources ==
- von Wolfhagen, Tilemann Elhen (2003). Peter Jentzmik (ed.). Eine wohlbeschriebene Chronick von der Stadt und den Herren zu Limpurg auff der Lahn (An Annotated Chronicle of the City and the Lords of Limburg on the Lahn) (in German) (2nd ed.). Limburg: Glaukos Verlag. ISBN 3-930428-19-9.(Unchanged reprint of the baroque 1720 edition from Verlag Winckler, Wetzlar).
- Großmann, G. Ulrich (2000). Limburg an der Lahn, Führer durch die Stadt und ihre Geschichte (Limburg an der Lahn, leaders of the city and its history) (in German) (5th ed.). Marburg: Trautvetter & Fischer. ISBN 3-87822-114-2..
- Nieder, Franz-Karl (2006). "Die Limburger Dynasten und die deutschen Könige 1292 bis 1356". Nassauische Annalen (in German). 117. Wiesbaden: Verlag des Vereines für Nassauische Altertumskunde und Geschichtsforschung. ISSN 0077-2887.

Preceded by:	John I	Succeeded by:
Gerlach IV	Count of Isenburg-Limburg; 1289–1312	Gerlach V
