= Gerlach V of Isenburg-Limburg =

German noble

Gerlach V of Isenburg-Limburg (died April 14, 1355), also called Gerlach II "the Elder" of Limburg, was Count of Isenburg-Limburg. He reigned between 1312 and 1355 as Lord of Limburg an der Lahn, and the head of the House of Limburg. The chronicler Tilemann Elhen von Wolfhagen describes him, in his pre-1402 Limburger Chronicle, as a virtuous nobleman and a bright poet in German and Latin.

== Life ==
Gerlach V's reign began on the death of his father John I in 1312. Under Gerlach II, the city of Limburg an der Lahn achieved its highest medieval flowering. The chronicler Tilemann Elhen reported that, at the height of its prosperity, the city could summon over 2,000 weapons-capable citizens.

Because of the marriage policies of his predecessors, Gerlach could rely on family relationships with most of the noble families in the vicinity. Gerlach acted as an arbitrator in several disputes between neighboring noble families. He was, like his father, chairman of the arbitrating body of the Ottonian line of the House of Nassau. In 1329 he also mediated a settlement between Gerlach I of Nassau-Wiesbaden-Idstein-Weilburg and William of Katzenelnbogen. The following year, he issued an arbitral award between William and John II of Katzenelnbogen. In 1331 Gerlach joined the Landfriedensbündnis (country peace alliance) of the Archbishop of Trier, Baldwin of Luxembourg. In 1339, he mediated a settlement between Gottfried of Diez and the House of Nassau.

The city of Limburg was strategically important due to its location on the main trade route from Cologne to Frankfurt. This led to frequent conflicts with neighbouring lordships and made the city a target of robber barons. As a result, the city was heavily fortified by the Counts of Limburg. In 1315, near the beginning of his reign, Gerlach built towers around the city. He laid out suburbs in front of the Diez and Frankfurt Gates and the approach to the bridge. The suburbs of Limburg extended beyond the limits of his dominion, leading to regular disputes with the neighboring Counts of Diez.

Under Gerlach’s administration, numerous construction projects, some of them started by his father, were completed in Limburg. These included the stone bridge over the Lahn River (1315) and the new church of the Franciscan monastery (1320, today the city church). He allowed the Williamite monastery founded on the island in the Lahn in 1312 to relocate in 1317 to a new building in the suburb in front of the Diez Gate. He also founded the Holy Spirit Hospital in the bridge-area suburb. The construction utilized forced labor from the farmers of Gerlach’s villages. The projects exceeded the financial capacity of the Lordship of Limburg, and Gerlach had to repeatedly borrow money from Limburg merchants.

In 1337, Gerlach expelled the Jews from Limburg. They were allowed to settle in the city again only after an order by Emperor Louis IV in 1341. In the same year, in response to a request by Gerlach, Louis' rival, King Charles IV, authorized the City of Limburg to collect bridge tolls.

A fire in 1342 and the first wave of the Black Death in 1349 began Limburg’s economic decline. The great fire of 1342 destroyed the greater part of the city. In the reconstruction, the city walls were extended around the suburb outside the Diez Gate, to offer more protection in a feud with the Counts of Diez. A moat was also added. The costs of the rebuilding effort after the fire and the cost of the feud ultimately exceeded the financial capacity of Gerlach, so that he had to pledge half of his realm of Archbishop Baldwin of Trier in 1344. At the beginning of 1346, he also pledged the second half to Baldwin.

War broke out when Charles IV was elected King of Germany in the place of Emperor Louis IV in July 1346. Archbishop Baldwin supported Charles, while Gerlach belonged to the supporters of Emperor Louis. In return for Gerlach’s services, the emperor issued a comprehensive letter of freedom for the town of Limburg in 1346, and granted Gerlach 20,000 pounds heller.

The fighting eventually spread to the Lahn Valley. Reinhard I of Westerburg, a supporter of Ludwig, had captured Grenzau Castle from Trier and on April 20, 1347, a relief army sent by Baldwin attacked from the rear. In the battle nearly 200 soldiers were killed, before Reinhard, followed by knights of Trier, escaped to Limburg Castle. Baldwin requested Gerlach to open the castle so he could arrest Reinhard. Baldwin pointed out that according to the pledge of his castle Gerlach had a sworn obligation to do so. Gerlach said he would legally examine the matter. On the day of judgment, about 800 soldiers from Westerburg were in Dietkirchen, while the army of Trier made its camp near Diez. In the court hearing, Gerlach declared that Reinhard’s attack was in accordance with the command of Emperor Louis IV, that Baldwin was an enemy of the Empire, and that Gerlach was therefore not bound by the oath he had sworn. The troops of Trier therefore withdrew and Reinhard of Westerburg returned home.

After the death of Emperor Louis in 1347, Gerlach succeeded in reconciling with Charles IV and Charles confirmed the rights that had been given by Louis IV.

In 1349, the Black Death ravaged Limburg. Tilemann Elhen reports that there were at least 2,400 deaths (without counting children). The Lordship of Limburg never recovered from the effects of the plague.

In 1351, Gerlach joined a feud of the House of Nassau against the House of Hatzfeld.

Gerlach died on April 14, 1355, probably in Limburg. He was succeeded by his son Gerlach III.

== Family and descendants ==
Gerlach’s first marriage was to Agnes of Nassau-Siegen. The wedding took place between 1312 and 1314. Three children were produced by this union:

- John II (died August 21, 1336); married Anna of Katzenelnbogen (died before 1353), daughter of William I of Katzenelnbogen, in 1329.
- Jutta (died March 12, 1336); married John of Katzenelnbogen.
- Uda (died 1361); in 1338, married Waldgrave Gerhard II of Kyrburg (a castle in present-day Kirn near Bad Kreuznach) and Schmidtburg (died 1356).

After the death of his first wife, Gerlach married Kunigunde of Wertheim. At least the following children are attributable to this marriage:

- Gerlach III (died 1365); followed his father as Lord of Limburg.
- Hermann (died 1365)
- John III (died 1406); a canon in Cologne and Trier, followed his brother Gerlach III (as John II) as last Count of Limburg from the House of Isenburg; married Hildegard (died 1419) of Saarwerden (a countship centered at present-day Sarre-Union, France).
- Otto; knight of the Teutonic Order; listed in 1400.
- Gerlach (died 1414); a canon in Trier
- Rudolph (died before October 7, 1374); a canon in Cologne and Trier and archdeacon in Würzburg.
- Kunigunde (died October 8, 1386); unmarried
- Elizabeth; abbess of Kaufungen Abbey

== Sources ==
- von Wolfhagen, Tilemann Elhen (2003). Peter Jentzmik (ed.). Eine wohlbeschriebene Chronick von der Stadt und den Herren zu Limpurg auff der Lahn (An Annotated Chronicle of the City and the Lords of Limburg on the Lahn) (in German) (2nd ed.). Limburg: Glaukos Verlag. ISBN 3-930428-19-9.(Unchanged reprint of the baroque 1720 edition from Verlag Winckler, Wetzlar).
- Großmann, G. Ulrich (2000). Limburg an der Lahn, Führer durch die Stadt und ihre Geschichte (Limburg an der Lahn, leaders of the city and its history) (in German) (5th ed.). Marburg: Trautvetter & Fischer. ISBN 3-87822-114-2..
- Nieder, Franz-Karl (2006). "Die Limburger Dynasten und die deutschen Könige 1292 bis 1356". Nassauische Annalen (in German). 117. Wiesbaden: Verlag des Vereines für Nassauische Altertumskunde und Geschichtsforschung. ISSN 0077-2887.

Preceded by:	Gerlach V	Succeeded by:
John I	Count of Isenburg-Limburg; 1312–1355	Gerlach VI
