= Gerlach IV of Isenburg-Limburg =

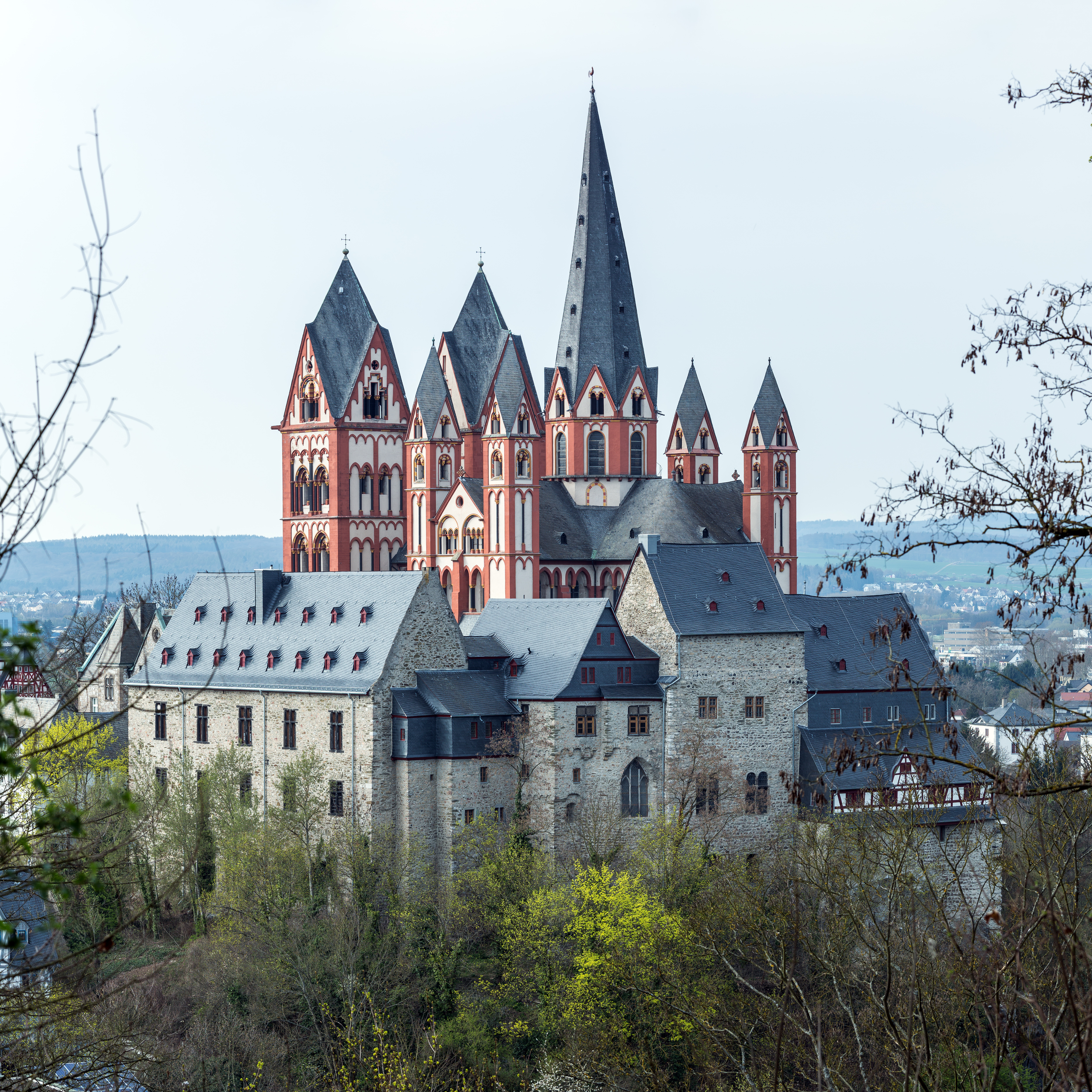
Limburg an der Lahn: Castle and Cathedral as seen from the southeast from the northwestern Greifenberg (Griffin Mountain)

Gerlach IV of Isenburg-Limburg (died 1289), also known as Gerlach I of Limburg, was from 1258 Count of (Isenburg-)Limburg, ruling over the town of Limburg an der Lahn and some villages in its hinterlands. He was the founder of the short-lived House of Limburg.

== Life ==
Gerlach was the son of Henry (Heinrich) I of Isenburg-Grenzau and his wife, Irmingard of Büdingen, Countess of Cleeberg (now part of Langgöns). Gerlach was a namesake of a senior Gerlach of Isenburg who served as Vogt of the Archbishopric of Trier from c. 1130 to 1147.

After the death of his father, Henry I, in ca. 1227, Gerlach reigned jointly with his brother Henry II over the paternal inheritance. From 1247, Gerlach took the title of “Lord of Limburg.” On May 22, 1258 the division of the inheritance was finally sealed: Gerlach won the dominion of Limburg and Henry II the Countship of Isenburg-Grenzau as their sole possessions.

From a trip to Italy in 1231, Gerlach brought monks of the Franciscan Order to whom he gave permission to construct a monastery in Limburg. This makes it one of the oldest Franciscan monasteries in Germany (the first being at Augsburg in 1221). The monastery was later endowed by the House of Limburg.

As the Lord of Limburg, Gerlach joined the opponents of the Hohenstaufen. He was probably involved in the looting of Worms in 1243/44. After the Great Interregnum (1254–1273), Gerlach supported King Rudolph of Habsburg. In 1276, he was commissioned by the king to confirm the Counts of Diez in their imperial fief.

In 1279, there was an uprising of the citizens of the town of Limburg, and Gerlach was expelled from the city. After negotiations, he was able to return to his castle in Limburg, but he had to grant the citizenry far-reaching freedoms. These freedoms included a pause in the collection of taxes and self-jurisdiction of marriages and housing. In the case of a dispute between the House of Limburg and the city, it would be decided by the jury of the City of Frankfurt. Upon his return, Gerlach expanded Limburg Castle, building the residential tower which is still extant today.

To secure his position, Gerlach sought dynastic connections with neighboring lordly houses, including Nassau, Westerburg, and Diez. His daughter Agnes married Henry I of Westerburg in 1267. Around the year 1270, his daughter Imagina married Count (and later King) Adolf of Nassau. By Adolf of Nassau, Gerlach was appointed Burgmann of the Imperial Castle of Kalsmunt in Wetzlar in 1287. On June 5, 1288 Gerlach, together with Adolf of Nassau and Henry of Westerburg, participated in the Battle of Worringen. They supported Henry of Westerburg's brother, Siegfried, the Archbishop of Cologne. Siegfried’s defeat in the battle had no significant consequences for Gerlach.

Gerlach I of Limburg died in 1289 during his participation in a campaign of King Rudolph in the Black Forest. He was succeeded by his son, John I.

== Marriage and descendants ==
Gerlach married Imagina of Blieskastel (died 1281). The couple had at least five children:

- John I, Count of Limburg.
- Gerlach II of Greifenstein, married between 1267 and 1273 into the House of Hachenburg.
- Henry (died 1279/80), married with Adelheid of Diez.
- Agnes (died 1319), married in July 1267 to Henry I of Westerburg.
- Imagina (died September 29, 1318 in Klarenthal Abbey); married Count Adolf of Nassau; Queen of Germany, 1292–1298

== Sources ==
- Crecelius, Wilhelm (1879). "Gerlach I.-IV". Allgemeine Deutsche Biographie (in German). 9. Leipzig: Duncker & Humblot: 5.
- Großmann, G. Ulrich (2000). Limburg an der Lahn, Führer durch die Stadt und ihre Geschichte (Limburg an der Lahn, leaders of the city and its history) (in German) (5th ed.). Marburg: Trautvetter & Fischer. ISBN 3-87822-114-2..
- Nieder, Franz-Karl (2006). "Die Limburger Dynasten und die deutschen Könige 1292 bis 1356". Nassauische Annalen (in German). 117. Wiesbaden: Verlag des Vereines für Nassauische Altertumskunde und Geschichtsforschung. ISSN 0077-2887.

| Preceded by: | Gerlach IV | Succeeded by: |
|---|---|---|
| Henry I of Isenburg-Grenzau | Count of Isenburg-Limburg; 1220–1289 | John I |
