= Adolf, Count Palatine of the Rhine =

Adolf
- Count Palatine of the Rhine
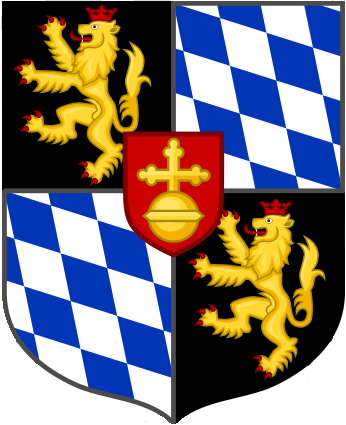
- Coat of arms of Count Palatine of Rhine
- Reign: 1319–1327
- Predecessor: Rudolf I (formally)
- Successor: Louis (IV)
- Born: 27 September 1300; Wolfratshausen
- Died: 29 January 1327 (aged 26); Neustadt
- Spouse: Irmengard of Oettingen
- Issue Detail: Rupert II, Elector Palatine of the Rhine
- House: Wittelsbach
- Father: Rudolf I, Duke of Bavaria
- Mother: Mechtild of Nassau

Adolf of the Rhine (German: Adolf der Redliche von der Pfalz) (27 September 1300, Wolfratshausen – 29 January 1327, Neustadt) from the house of Wittelsbach was formally Count Palatine of the Rhine from 1319 to 1327.

He was the second son of Rudolf I, Duke of Bavaria and his wife Mechtild of Nassau. He didn't really rule because his uncle Louis IV occupied the Palatinate until an agreement with Adolf's brothers and his son Rupert II, Elector Palatine of the Rhine was concluded in Pavia in 1329.

== Family and children ==
He was married in 1320 to Countess Irmengard of Oettingen (d. 1399), daughter of Count Louis VI of Oettingen. They had the following children:

1. Rupert II, Elector Palatine of the Rhine (12 May 1325, Amberg–6 January 1398, Amberg)
2. Adolf.
3. Friedrich.
4. a daughter (d. 1389), married Count Meinhard I of Ortenburg.

He was buried in the Cistercian monastery of Schönau near Heidelberg.

== Ancestry ==
Ancestors of Adolf, Count Palatine of the Rhine

16. Louis I of Bavaria
8. Otto II of Bavaria
17. Ludmilla of Bohemia
4. Louis II of Bavaria
18. Henry V of the Palatinate
9. Agnes of the Palatinate
19. Agnes of Hohenstaufen
2. Rudolf I of Bavaria
20. Albert IV of Habsburg
10. Rudolf I of Germany
21. Hedwig of Kyburg
5. Matilda of Habsburg
22. Burkhard V of Hohenberg
11. Gertrude of Hohenberg
23. Matilda of Tübingen
1. Adolf
24. Henry II of Nassau
12. Walram II of Nassau
25. Matilda of Guelders
6. Adolf, King of the Romans
26. Dieter IV of Katzenelnbogen
13. Adelheid of Katzenelnbogen
27. Hildegunde
3. Mechtild of Nassau
28. Henry I of Isenburg-Grenzau
14. Gerlach IV of Isenburg-Limburg
29. Irmingard of Büdingen
7. Imagina of Isenburg-Limburg
15. Imagina of Blieskastel

== Sources ==
- Thomas, Andrew L. (2010). A House Divided: Wittelsbach Confessional Court Cultures in the Holy Roman Empire, c. 1550-1650. Brill.

Adolf, Count Palatine of the Rhine House of Wittelsbach Born: 1300 Died: 1327
Regnal titles
Preceded by Rudolf I (formally)	(Titular) Elector Palatine of the Rhine; 1319–1327	Succeeded by Louis (IV)
