= Isenburg-Limburg =

State of the Holy Roman Empire

County of Isenburg-Limburg Grafschaft Isenburg-Limburg
- 1258–1406
- Coat of arms
- Status: State of the Holy Roman Empire
- Capital: Limburg an der Lahn
- Government: County
- Historical era: Middle Ages
  - Partitioned from Isenburg-Grenzau: May 22 1258
  - Annexed by Archbishopric of Trier: 1406
Preceded by	Succeeded by
Isenburg-Grenzau	Archbishopric of Trier

The Countship of Isenburg-Limburg was a state of the Holy Roman Empire in the 13th and 14th centuries, based around the city of Limburg an der Lahn in modern Hesse, Germany.

== House of Limburg ==
The short-lived House of Limburg (or House of Isenburg-Limburg) was a collateral line of the House of Isenburg. From the House of Limburg came several canons in Cologne and Trier. The House of Limburg also had familial relationships to the Houses of Nassau and Westerburg in addition to the other lines of the House of Isenburg.

== Territory and rights of the Lordship of Limburg ==
The core of the territory was the town of Limburg an der Lahn and the Vogtship of St. George's Cathedral in Limburg. It also included the villages of Elz, Neesbach (a part of present-day Hünfelden), Oberbrechen and Werschau (both now parts of Brechen), and the Werode Zent. Along with it went the Lordship of Cleeberg, including the places Cleeberg, Oberkleen, and Ebergöns (all now part of Langgöns), Brandoberndorf (now part of Waldsolms), and a share of Schloss Schaumburg (in Balduinstein). The Lordship of Cleeberg and the share in Schaumburg, however, were later given away as a dowry.

The feudal lords of the Countship of Limburg were the Landgraviate of Hesse, Archbishopric of Mainz, and the Holy Roman Empire, each owning a third.

Limburg Castle was the residence of the Counts of Limburg, who built the majority of the structures still extant today. Gerlach I was probably the builder of the residential tower. In 1379 a fire burned parts of the castle. In 1400 John II built the southern two-story hall.

The rulers of the house were buried in the Cathedral in Limburg. Construction of the cathedral had begun in 1212, and was completed by the counts in 1232. It remains the city church today. The town's Franciscan monastery was founded under Gerlach IV. John I of Limburg built St. Peter's Chapel between 1289 and 1298.

== History ==
The Lordship of Limburg passed to the House of Isenburg between 1219 and 1221 as an inheritance through the male line of the extinct House of Leiningen. Gerlach IV of Isenburg who succeeded, with his brother Henry II, their father Count Henry I of Isenburg-Grenzau between 1220 and 1227, chose Limburg as his residence. He took the title Lord of Limburg in 1248. On May 22, 1258, Gerlach and Henry divided the inheritance between themselves. Gerlach won sole possession of the city of Limburg and took the title Gelach I, Count of Limburg.

The relationship between the Counts of Limburg and the citizenry of the city was tense. In 1279 the citizens expelled Gerlach I from the city. After negotiations, he was able to return to his castle, but he had to grant the citizenry far-reaching freedoms. In 1288, Gerlach participated together with Nassau and Westerburg at the Battle of Worringen on the side of the Archbishop of Cologne, Siegfried II of Westerburg.

The dynasty of the House of Limburg was active on behalf of the German kings. In particular, John I worked from 1292 to 1298 for his brother-in-law, King Adolf of Nassau, who was married to John's sister Imagina of Isenburg-Limburg. Despite his participation in the Battle of Göllheim on the side of King Adolf, he was later able to gain the favor of Adolf's opponent and successor, King Albert of Habsburg.

The city of Limburg an der Lahn was strategically important due to its location on the main trade route from Cologne to Frankfurt. This led to frequent conflicts with neighbouring lordships and made the city a target of robber-barons. As a result, the city was heavily fortified by the Counts of Limburg. Towers were built around the city in 1315. In 1343 walls and a moat were added to surround the town.

Under Gerlach II, the city of Limburg achieved its highest medieval flowering. The chronicler Tilemann Elhen von Wolfhagen writes in his chronicle of Limburg before 1402 that, before the plague, the city could summon over 2,000 weapons-capable citizens. Gerlach constructed the stone bridge over the Lahn and laid out suburbs in front of the Dietz and Frankfurt Gates and the approach to the bridge. With a fire in 1342 and the first wave of the Black Death in 1349, however, began its economic decline.

In 1344 half of the castle, town and lordship was pledged to Baldwin of Luxembourg, Archbishop of Trier. In 1374 Limburg's imperial sovereignty also fell to Trier.

In 1365, Gerlach III died in the plague without male heirs. With the permission of Pope Urban V, his brother John put aside the office of Canon of Trier Cathedral and took over the rule of Limburg as John II. John II died in 1406 as the last male representative of the House of Limburg. The Archbishopric of Trier finally took over the city and the whole of the Lordship of Limburg.

== Sources ==
- von Wolfhagen, Tilemann Elhen (2003). Peter Jentzmik (ed.). Eine wohlbeschriebene Chronick von der Stadt und den Herren zu Limpurg auff der Lahn (An Annotated Chronicle of the City and the Lords of Limburg on the Lahn) (in German) (2nd ed.). Limburg: Glaukos Verlag. ISBN 3-930428-19-9.(Unchanged reprint of the baroque 1720 edition from Verlag Winckler, Wetzlar).
- Großmann, G. Ulrich (2000). Limburg an der Lahn, Führer durch die Stadt und ihre Geschichte (Limburg an der Lahn, leaders of the city and its history) (in German) (5th ed.). Marburg: Trautvetter & Fischer. ISBN 3-87822-114-2..
- Nieder, Franz-Karl (2006). "Die Limburger Dynasten und die deutschen Könige 1292 bis 1356". Nassauische Annalen (in German). 117. Wiesbaden: Verlag des Vereines für Nassauische Altertumskunde und Geschichtsforschung. ISSN 0077-2887.
