= Johann Friedrich Schannat =

German historian

Johann Friedrich Schannat (23 July 1683 – 6 March 1739) was a historian from the Holy Roman Empire.

Schannat was born in Luxembourg. He studied at the University of Louvain and when twenty-two years of age was a lawyer, but before long he turned his attention exclusively to history and became a priest. The Prince-Abbot of Fulda commissioned Schannat to write the history of the abbey and appointed him historiographer and librarian. At a later date he received similar commissions from Franz Georg von Schönborn, Archbishop of Trier and Bishop of Worms. In 1735 the Archbishop of Prague, Count Moriz von Manderscheid, sent Schannat to Italy to collect material for a history of the councils. He made researches with especial success in the Ambrosian Library in Milan and the Vatican Library at Rome. He died in Heidelberg.

== Publications ==
- Vindemiae literariae (1723–24);
- Corpus traditionum Fuldensium (1724);
- Fuldischer Lehnhof (1726);
- Dioecesis Fuldensis (1727);
- Historia Fuldensis (1729);
- Historia episcopatus Wormatiensis (1734);
- Histoire abregee de la maison Palatine (1740).
- Concilia Germaniae, edited from material left by Schannat and continued by the Jesuit Hermann Joseph Hartzheim (11 fol. vols., 1759–90).
- Eiflia illustrata (1825–55) was also published at a later date.
