= Rupert I, Elector Palatine =

14th-century German elector and nobleman

Rupert I "the Red"
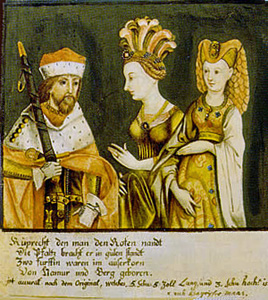
- Rupert I, Elector Palatine, with his wives.

Elector Palatine
- Reign: 10 January 1356 – 16 February 1390
- Predecessor: New title
- Successor: Rupert II
- Born: 9 June 1309; Wolfratshausen
- Died: 16 February 1390 (aged 80); Neustadt an der Weinstraße
- Spouse: Elisabeth, Countess of Namur; Beatrix of Jülich-Berg
- House: House of Wittelsbach
- Father: Rudolf I, Duke of Bavaria
- Mother: Mechtild of Nassau

Rupert I "the Red", Elector Palatine (German: Ruprecht der Rote; 9 June 1309, Wolfratshausen – 16 February 1390, Neustadt an der Weinstraße) was Count Palatine of the Rhine from 1353 to 1356, and Elector Palatine from 10 January 1356 to 16 February 1390.

He was the son of Rudolf I, Duke of Bavaria and Mechtild of Nassau, the daughter of Adolf of Nassau-Weilburg, King of Germany. With the death of his brother, Rudolf II, on 4 October 1353, he inherited his domains and became sole Count for the territory, whereas they had previously shared that privilege.

The Golden Bull of 1356 guaranteed the Palatinate the right of participating in the election of the Holy Roman Emperor. Previous Counts Palatine had participated in other Imperial elections.

In 1386, Rupert founded Heidelberg University, the third university in the Holy Roman Empire, which was named after him.

Rupert was married twice: firstly to Elisabeth, Countess of Namur (daughter of John I, Marquis of Namur), secondly to Beatrix of Jülich-Berg, the great-granddaughter of his elder brother Adolf, Count Palatine of the Rhine. Neither marriage produced an heir.

He was succeeded by his nephew, Rupert II, Elector Palatine, grandfather of his second wife.

Rupert I, Elector Palatine House of Wittelsbach Born: 9 June 1309 Died: 16 February 1390
German nobility
Regnal titles
Preceded by Rudolf II	Count Palatine of the Rhine; 1353–1356	Succeeded by Palatinate recognized as a secular electorate
New title	Elector Palatine; 1356–1390	Succeeded by Rupert II
