= Rudolf II, Count Palatine of the Rhine =

Rudolf II
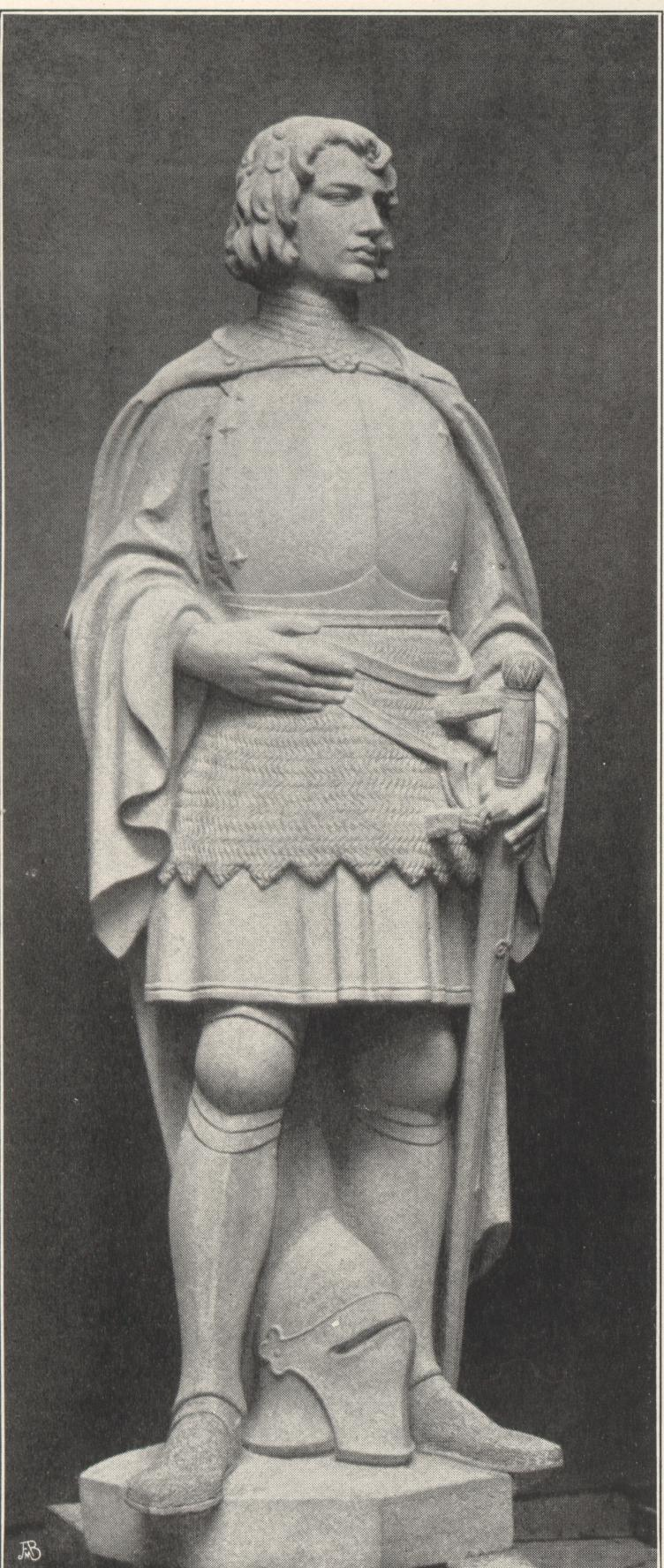
- Statue of Rudolf II by Hubert Netzer

Count Palatine of the Rhine
- Reign: 1329–1353
- Predecessor: Louis (IV)
- Successor: Rupert I
- Born: 8 August 1306; Wolfratshausen
- Died: 4 October 1353 (aged 47); Neustadt
- Spouse: Anne of Carinthia-Tyrol; Margaret of Sicily
- Issue: Anne, Queen of Bohemia and Germany
- Father: Rudolf I, Duke of Bavaria
- Mother: Mechtild of Nassau

Rudolf II "the Blind" (8 August 1306 – 4 October 1353) was Count Palatine of the Rhine (see Palatinate) from 1329 to 1353.

He was born in Wolfratshausen, the son of Rudolf I, Duke of Bavaria, and Mechtild of Nassau, daughter of King Adolf of Nassau-Weilburg. His uncle was Emperor Louis IV.

During his childhood, his father and his uncle fought over their inheritance. After the death of his father, his family was placed under the guardianship of Duke Johann von Nassau, who was a partisan of the Austrian cause.

His uncle, Louis IV, Holy Roman Emperor had taken the Palatinate by force of arms. In August 1322, the war finally came to an end, but only after Mechthild's death in June 1323, were the three nephews finally able to make peace with their uncle. His sons inherited Bavaria and Rudolf I's sons inherited the Upper Palatinate and the Palatinate in line with the Treaty of Pavia.

He was blind only in the last years of his life.

== Posterity ==
Rudolph married twice:

- In 1328, he married Anne of Carinthia-Tyrol (1300 – 31 October 1331), daughter of Duke Otto III of Carinthia

They had one daughter: Anne of the Palatinate (26 September 1329 – 2 February 1353) who married in 1349 the Holy Roman Emperor Charles IV

- In 1348, he married Margaret of Sicily (1331 – 1377), daughter of King Frederick II of Sicily and Eleanor of Anjou.

He died in Neustadt.

Rudolf II, Count Palatine of the Rhine House of Wittelsbach Born: 1306 Died: 1353
Regnal titles
Preceded by Louis (IV)	Count Palatine of the Rhine; 1329–1353	Succeeded by Rupert I
