= Rupert, King of the Romans =

King of Germany from 1400 to 1410

Rupert
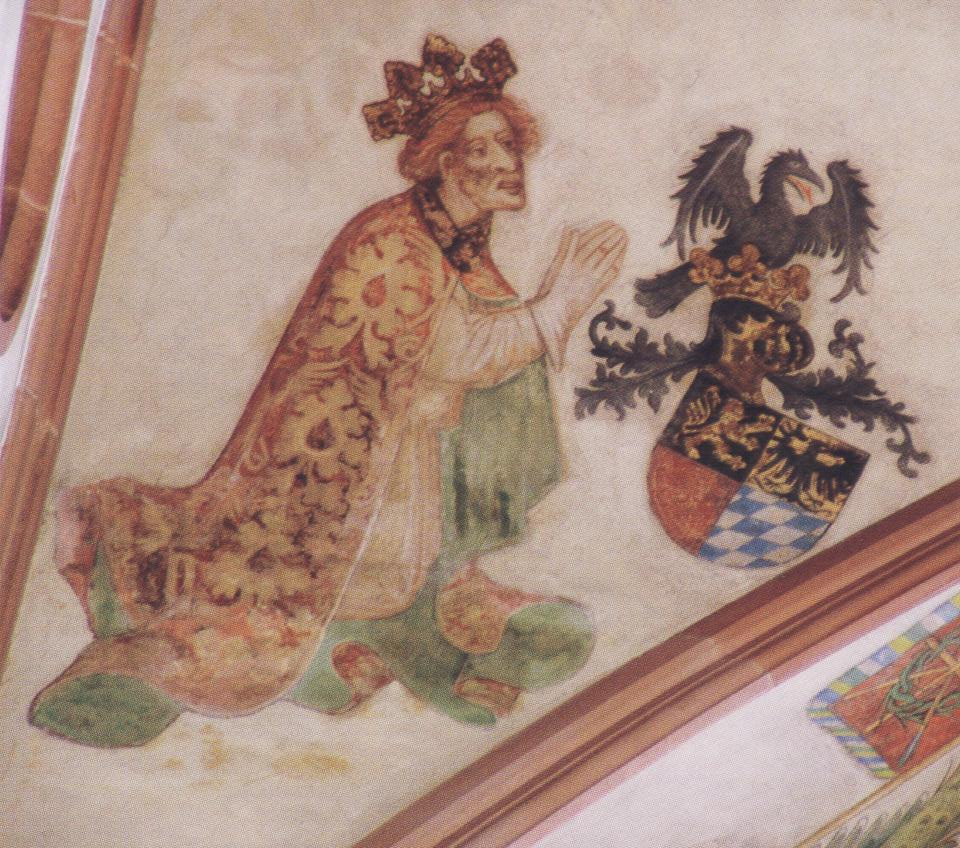
- Contemporary painting in the collegiate church of Neustadt an der Weinstraße

King of the Romans (informally King of Germany)
- Reign: 21 August 1400 – 18 May 1410
- Coronation: 6 January 1401
- Predecessor: Wenceslaus
- Successor: Jobst of Moravia

Elector Palatine
- Reign: 6 January 1398 – 18 May 1410
- Predecessor: Rupert II
- Successor: Louis III
- Born: 5 May 1352; Amberg, Upper Palatinate
- Died: 18 May 1410 (aged 58); Landskron Castle, Oppenheim, Electoral Palatinate
- Burial: Church of the Holy Spirit, Heidelberg
- Spouse: Elisabeth of Hohenzollern
- Issue: Margaret, Duchess of Lorraine; Louis III, Elector Palatine; John, Count Palatine of Neumarkt; Stephen, Count Palatine of Simmern-Zweibrücken; Otto I, Count Palatine of Mosbach
- House: Wittelsbach
- Father: Rupert II, Elector Palatine
- Mother: Beatrice of Aragon

Rupert of the Palatinate (German: Ruprecht von der Pfalz; 5 May 1352 – 18 May 1410), a member of the House of Wittelsbach, was Elector Palatine from 1398 (as Rupert III) and King of the Romans from 1400 until his death.

== Early life ==
Rupert was born at Amberg in the Upper Palatinate, the son of Elector Palatine Rupert II and Beatrice of Aragon, daughter of King Peter II of Sicily. Rupert's great-granduncle was the Wittelsbach Holy Roman Emperor Louis IV. He was raised at the Dominican Liebenau monastery near Worms, where his widowed grandmother Irmengard of Oettingen lived as a nun.

== Reign ==
From his early years Rupert took part in the government of the Electoral Palatinate to which he succeeded on his father's death in 1398. He and the three ecclesiastical prince-electors (of Mainz, Cologne and Trier) met at Lahneck Castle in Oberlahnstein on 20 August 1400 and declared their King of the Romans, Wenceslaus, deposed. On the next day the same four electors met at Rhens to ballot for Rupert as the next King of the Romans, thus the majority of the college including the Elector Palatine's own vote. As the Imperial City of Aachen refused to let him enter through its gates, Rupert was crowned by Archbishop Frederick III of Saarwerden in Cologne on 6 January 1401.

Lacking a solid power base in the Holy Roman Empire, his rule remained contested by Wenceslaus' family, the mighty House of Luxembourg, though Wenceslaus himself did not take any action to regain his royal title. In the Western Schism, Rupert backed the Roman Pope Boniface IX who, however, was reluctant to acknowledge his rule in view of the Luxembourg claims. After the king had won some recognition in Southern Germany, he started a campaign to Italy, where he hoped to crush the rule of Duke Gian Galeazzo Visconti over the thriving Duchy of Milan and to be crowned Holy Roman Emperor by the Pope at the Saint Peter's Basilica, Rome. In the autumn of 1401 he crossed the Alps, but was defeated at Brescia and in April 1402 Rupert returned to Germany.

The news of this failure increased the disorder in Germany, but the king met with some success in his efforts to restore peace. The Luxembourg resistance waned after Wenceslaus was arrested at Prague Castle by his younger brother Sigismund in March 1402 and the next year his lordship was finally recognized by the Pope. Rupert also gained the support of England by the marriage of his son Louis with Blanche of Lancaster, daughter of King Henry IV on 6 July 1402. In his Palatinate hereditary lands, Rupert turned out to be a capable ruler.

It was nevertheless only the indolence of Wenceslaus that prevented his overthrow. After attempts to enlarge the king's allodium caused conflicts with his former ally, the Archbishop of Mainz Johan II of Nassau forging an alliance with Count Eberhard III of Württemberg, the Zähringen Margrave Bernard I of Baden and several Swabian cities in 1405, Rupert was compelled to make certain concessions. The quarrel was complicated by the Papal Schism, but the king was just beginning to make some headway when he died at his castle of Landskrone near Oppenheim on 18 May 1410 and was buried at the Church of the Holy Spirit in Heidelberg.

On his deathbed Rupert had decreed the division of his heritage among his four surviving sons. He was succeeded as Elector of the Palatinate by the eldest surviving son, Louis III. The second surviving son, John, received the County Palatine of Neumarkt, the third surviving son, Stephen, Count Palatine of Simmern-Zweibrücken, and the youngest son, Otto, the County Palatine of Mosbach. In the following imperial election on September 20, Louis III voted for Sigismund of Luxembourg, who however lost to his cousin Margrave Jobst of Moravia.

== Family and children ==
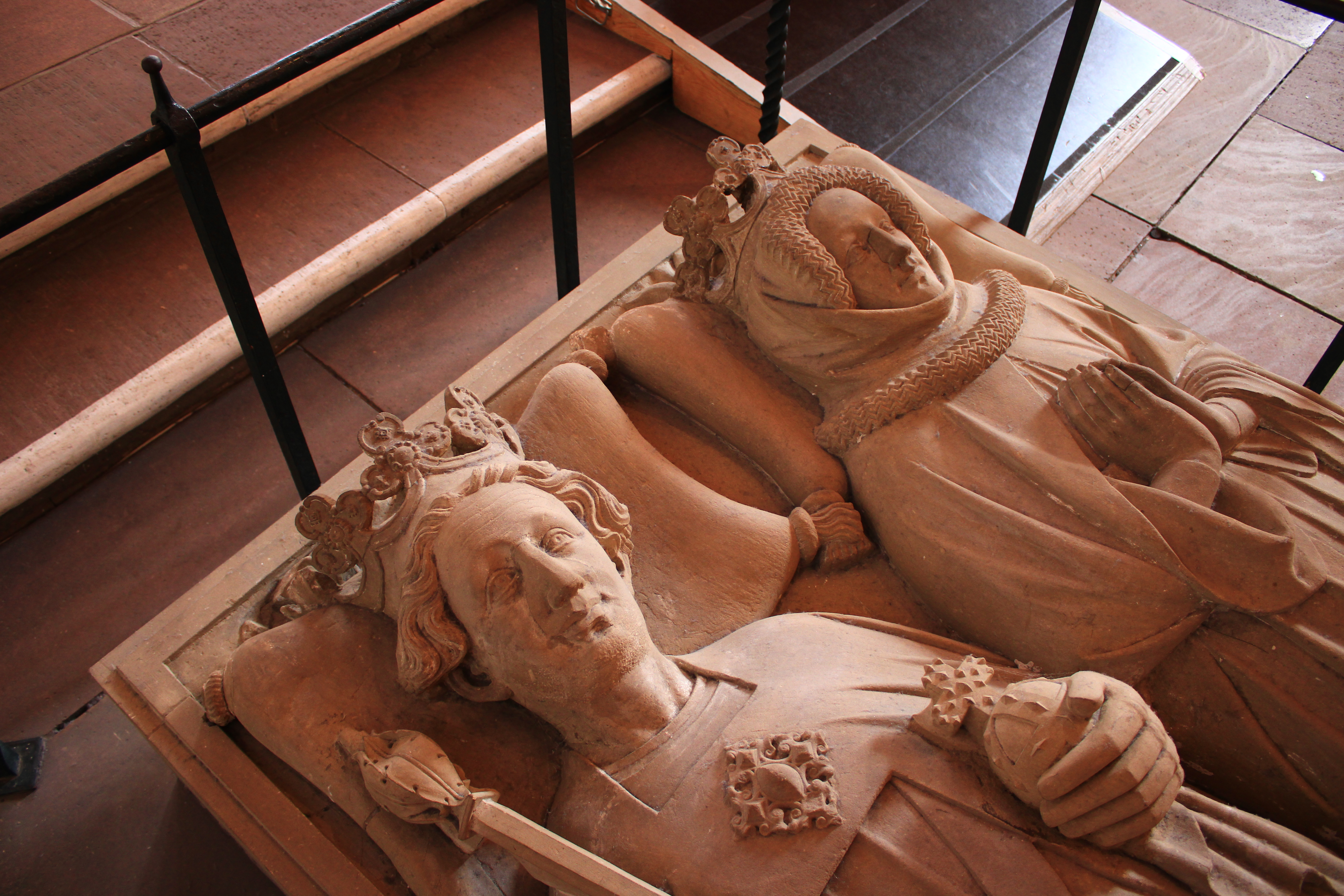
Rupert and his wife Elisabeth of Nuremberg, detail from their tomb in the Church of the Holy Spirit, Heidelberg

He was married in Amberg on 27 June 1374 to Elisabeth, daughter of Burgrave Frederick V of Nuremberg and Elisabeth of Meissen.

They had the following children:

1. Rupert Pipan (20 February 1375, Amberg – 25 January 1397, Amberg).
2. Margaret (1376 – 27 August 1434, Nancy), married on 6 February 1393 to Duke Charles II of Lorraine
3. Frederick (c. 1377, Amberg – 7 March 1401, Amberg).
4. Louis III, Elector Palatine (23 January 1378 – 30 December 1436, Heidelberg).
5. Agnes (1379 – 1401, Heidelberg), married in Heidelberg shortly before March 1400 to Duke Adolph I of Cleves.
6. Elisabeth (27 October 1381 – 31 December 1408, Innsbruck), married in Innsbruck 24 December 1407 to Duke Frederick IV of Austria.
7. Count Palatine John of Neumarkt (1383, Neunburg vorm Wald – 13–14 March 1443, Kastl).
8. Count Palatine Stephen of Simmern-Zweibrücken (23 June 1385 – 14 February 1459, Simmern).
9. Count Palatine Otto I of Mosbach (24 August 1390, Mosbach – 5 July 1461, Reichenbach).

== Legacy ==
Rupert's strenuous efforts earned him the surname Clemens ("the Gentle"). He also commissioned the Ruprecht building in Heidelberg Castle.

== See also ==
- Kings of Germany family tree. He was related to every other king of Germany.

== Sources ==
- Bogdan, Henry (2007). La Lorraine des Ducs (in French). Perrin.
- Hlavacek, Ivan (2000). "The Empire:The Luxembourgs and Rupert of the Palatinate, 1347-1410". The New Cambridge Medieval History. Vol. 6:c.1300-1415. Cambridge University Press.
- Law, John E. (2010). "Brescia, Fight near (1401)". In Rogers, Clifford J. (ed.). The Oxford Encyclopedia of Medieval Warfare and Military Technology. Oxford University Press.
- Scott, Tom (1998). "Germany and the Empire". In Allmand, Christopher (ed.). The New Cambridge Medieval History. Vol. 7:c.1415-c.1500. Cambridge University Press.
- Thomas, Andrew L. (2010). A House Divided: Wittelsbach Confessional Court Cultures in the Holy Roman Empire, c.1550-1650. Brill.
- Chisholm, Hugh, ed. (1911). "Rupert (king)" . Encyclopædia Britannica (11th ed.). Cambridge University Press.

Rupert, King of the Romans House of Wittelsbach Born: 1352 Died: 1410
Regnal titles
Preceded by Rupert II	Elector Palatine; 1398–1410	Succeeded by Louis III
Preceded by Rupert II	Count of Zweibrücken; 1398–1410	Succeeded by Stephen
Preceded by Wenceslaus	King of the Romans; King of Germany; 1400–1410	Succeeded by Sigismund; Jobst
