= Schönau Abbey (Odenwald) =

Monastery in Germany

Coordinates: 49°26′09″N 8°48′34″E

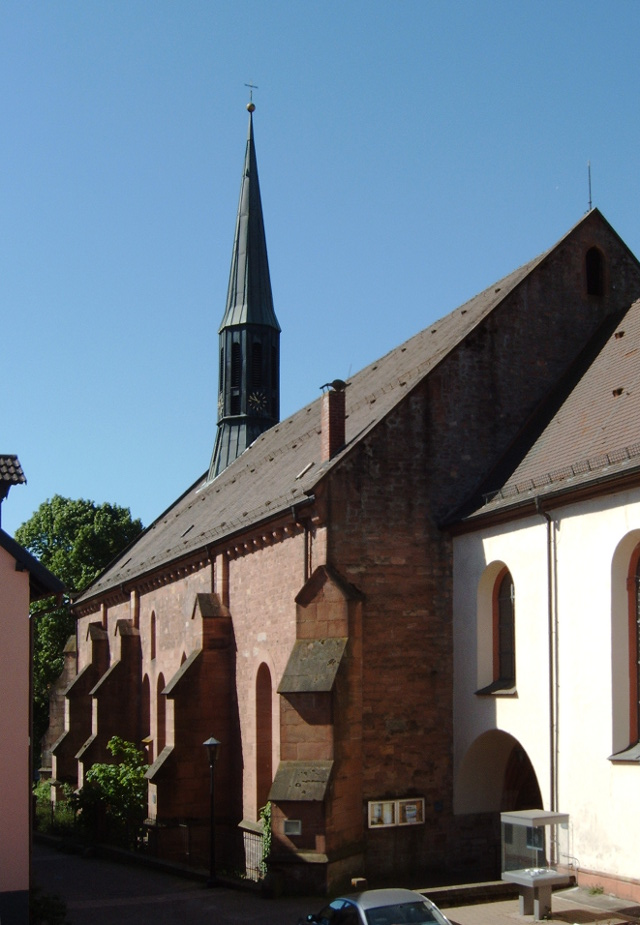
Protestant church, formerly the refectory of Schönau Abbey

Schönau Abbey (Kloster Schönau) in Schönau in the Odenwald, in the Rhein-Neckar-Kreis in Baden-Württemberg, was a Cistercian monastery founded in 1142 from Eberbach Abbey. The present settlement of Schönau grew up round the monastery.

== History ==
Schönau Abbey was founded in 1142 by Burchard II von Asorn, Prince-Bishop of Worms, with Cistercians from Eberbach Abbey. The monastery came under the patronage of the Counts Palatine of the Rhine. In 1156 Emperor Frederick Barbarossa conferred upon his half-brother the Vogtei of Schönau Abbey. Around 1190, Rudolph I, Count Palatine of Tübingen gave the Cistercians the abandoned Premonstratensian abbey of Bebenhausen. It became a daughter house of Schönau.

During the Reformation the abbey was dissolved, in 1558. In 1562, Frederick III, Elector Palatine used the empty buildings to provide housing for Huguenot refugees from Wallonia.

== Burials ==
By the end of the 12th century Schönau was already in use as a burial place of the Staufen family: in 1195 Conrad of Hohenstaufen, Count Palatine of the Rhine, was buried here, as were his son of the same name, probably in 1186, and both his wives. Adolf, Count Palatine of the Rhine (d. 1327), Rupert II, Elector Palatine (d. 1398) and other members of the family were also buried here. Conrad II, Bishop of Hildesheim, died here and was presumably also buried here.

In the 14th century Schönau was also the burial place of the Counts of Erbach.

== Buildings ==
Physical remains of the abbey include the abbey church of c. 1230, and also the abbey gateway (c. 1200), the former refectory, and the "Walloon forge" (the former abbey forge, renovated by the Huguenot refugees from Wallonia after 1558).

== Literature ==
- Die Stadt- und Landkreise Heidelberg und Mannheim. Amtliche Kreisbeschreibung. Heidelberg 1968
- Berendes, H.U., 1984: Die Bischöfe von Worms und ihr Hochstift im 12. Jahrhundert. Diss. Köln
- de Gudenus, V.F., 1728: Sylloge I variorum diplomatariorum monumentorumque veterum ineditorum adhuc et res germanicas in primis vero moguntinas illustrantium. Frankfurt
- Derwein, Herbert, 1931: Das Zisterzienserkloster Schönau. Mit den Zeichnungen des 16. Jahrhunderts aus dem Germanischen Nationalmuseum in Nürnberg. Franzmathes: Frankfurt Online-Publikation der Universitätsbibliothek Heidelberg
- Edelmaier, Robert, 1915: Das Kloster Schönau bei Heidelberg. Ein Beitrag zur Baugeschichte der Cisterzienser. (Dissertation TH Karlsruhe 1913). Gustav Koester: Heidelberg
- Huffschmid, Maximilian: Beiträge zur Geschichte der Cisterzienserabtei Schönau bei Heidelberg. in: ZGO 45 (1891), pp. 415–449; ZGO 46 (1892), pp. 69–103
- Kaiser, Jürgen, and Götz von Roman, 2000: Schönau. Evangelische Stadtkirche, ehemalige Zisterzienserabtei. Schnell & Steiner: Regensburg ISBN 3-7954-5442-5
- Kreisarchiv und Referat für Öffentlichkeitsarbeit des Rhein-Neckar-Kreises in Verbindung mit der Stadt Schönau und dem Verein Alt Schönau e.V. (ed.), 2002: Kloster und Hühnerfautei Schönau. Heidelberg ISBN 3-932102-08-8
- Neumüllers-Klauser, Renate, 1970: Die Inschriften der Stadt und des Landkreises Heidelberg. Stuttgart
- Rothfuss, Virto-Christian: Die Schönauer Epitaphien der Pfalzgrafen bei Rhein. in: Der Odenwald 54 (2007), pp. 99–102
- Schaab, Meinrad, 1990: Die Zisterzienserabtei Schönau im Odenwald (2nd edition). Winter: Heidelberg ISBN 3-533-04256-1 (Heidelberger Veröffentlichungen zur Landesgeschichte und Landeskunde, 8)
