= Rupert II, Elector Palatine =

Elector Palatine from 1390 to 1394

Rupert II
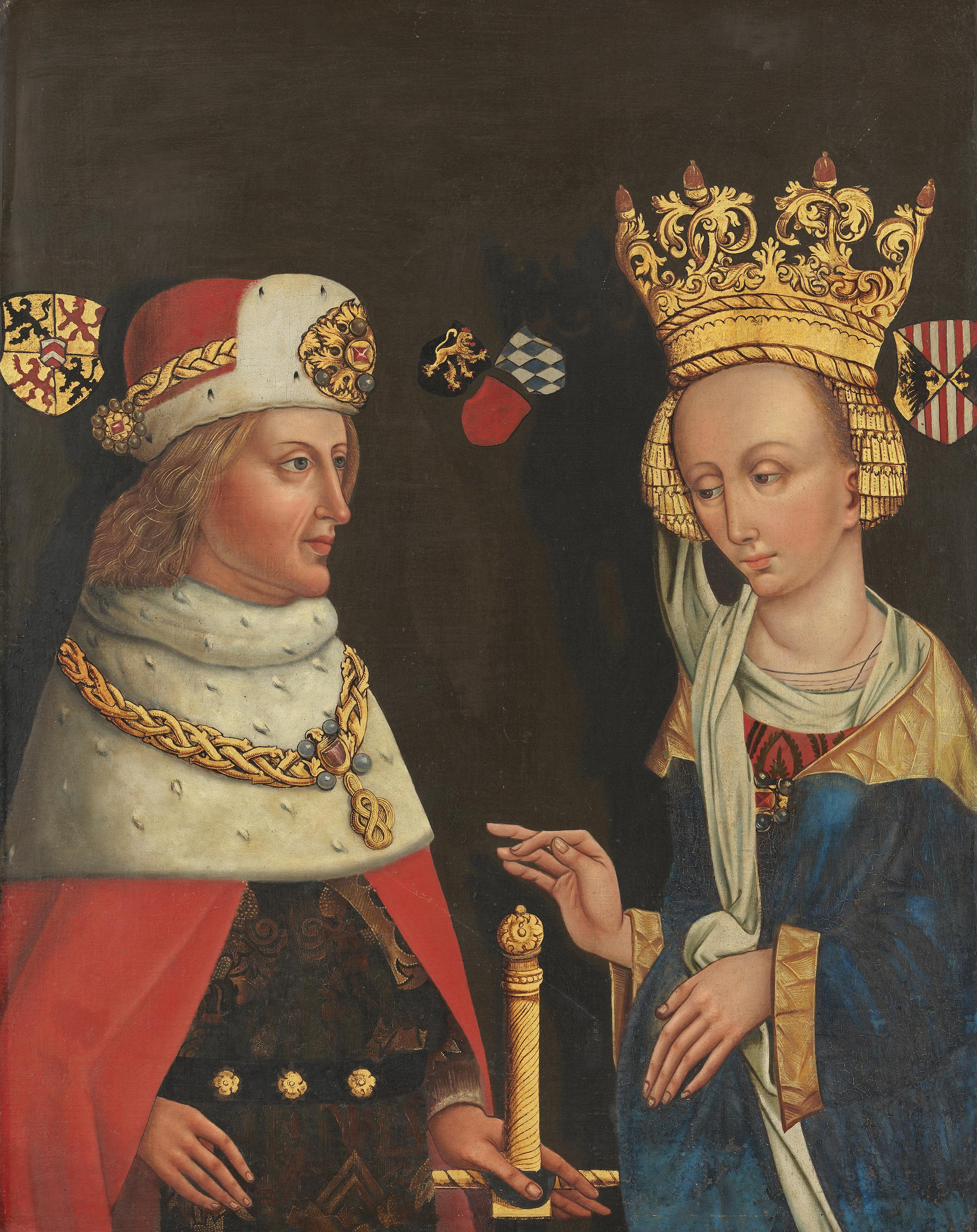
- Rupert with his wife Beatrice

Elector Palatine
- Reign: 16 February 1390 – 6 January 1398
- Predecessor: Rupert I
- Successor: Rupert III
- Born: 12 May 1325; Amberg
- Died: 6 January 1398 (aged 72); Amberg
- Burial: Cistercian monastery in Heidelberg
- Spouse: Beatrix of Sicily
- Issue: Rupert, King of the Romans
- House: Wittelsbach
- Father: Adolf, Count Palatine of the Rhine
- Mother: Irmengard of Oettingen

Rupert II, Count Palatine of the Rhine (German: Ruprecht II., der Harte (der Ernste)) (12 May 1325, Amberg – 6 January 1398, Amberg). He was the Elector Palatine of the Rhine from the house of Wittelsbach in 1390–1398.

== Life ==
Rupert was the elder son of Adolf, Count Palatine of the Rhine and Countess Irmengard of Oettingen. On 13 February 1338 the Palatinate was divided between Rupert II and his uncle Rudolf II, Duke of Bavaria. After the death of his other uncle, the Elector Rupert I (who had succeeded Rudolf II), on 16 February 1390 he was proclaimed Elector Palatine with the consent of Wenceslaus, King of the Romans. In 1391 he banished Jews and prostitutes from the Palatinate, confiscated their property, and bequeathed it to the Ruprecht Karl University of Heidelberg. In 1395 he promulgated the so-called Rupertinische Konstitution which was intended to provide for unity of the Palatinate. Among other provisions, he incorporated to his realm the former Imperial Free City Neckargemünd.

He was buried in Schönau Abbey, a Cistercian monastery in Heidelberg.

== Family and children ==
Rupert was married in 1345 to Beatrice, daughter of King Peter II of Sicily. They had:

1. Anna (1346 – 30 November 1415), married in 1363 to William VII of Jülich, 1st Duke of Berg.
2. Friedrich (1347 – c. 1395).
3. Johann (1349 – c. 1395).
4. Mechthild (born 1350), married to Landgrave Sigost of Leuchtenberg.
5. Elisabeth (c. 1351 – 1360).
6. King Rupert of Germany (1352 – 1410), married Elisabeth of Nuremberg
7. Adolf (1355 – 1 May 1358).

== Sources ==
- Junginger, Horst (2017). The Scientification of the "Jewish Question" in Nazi Germany. Brill.
- Thomas, Andrew L. (2010). A House Divided: Wittelsbach Confessional Court Cultures in the Holy Roman Empire, c. 1550-1650. Brill.

Rupert II, Elector Palatine House of Wittelsbach Born: 12 May 1325 Died: 6 January 1398
Regnal titles
Preceded by Rupert I	Elector Palatine; 1390–1398	Succeeded by Rupert III
