= Adelheid of Katzenelnbogen =

- Died: 22 February 1288; Mainz
- Noble family: House of Katzenelnbogen
- Spouse: Walram II of Nassau
- Issue: Diether; Adolf; Richardis; Matilda; Imagina
- Father: Diether IV of Katzenelnbogen
- Mother: Hildegunde

Adelheid of Katzenelnbogen (German: Adelheid von Katzenelnbogen; died 22 February 1288) was a countess from the House of Katzenelnbogen and, by marriage, countess of Nassau. She is a direct ancestor of the Walramiam branch of the House of Nassau and of the Grand Dukes of Luxembourg.

== Biography ==
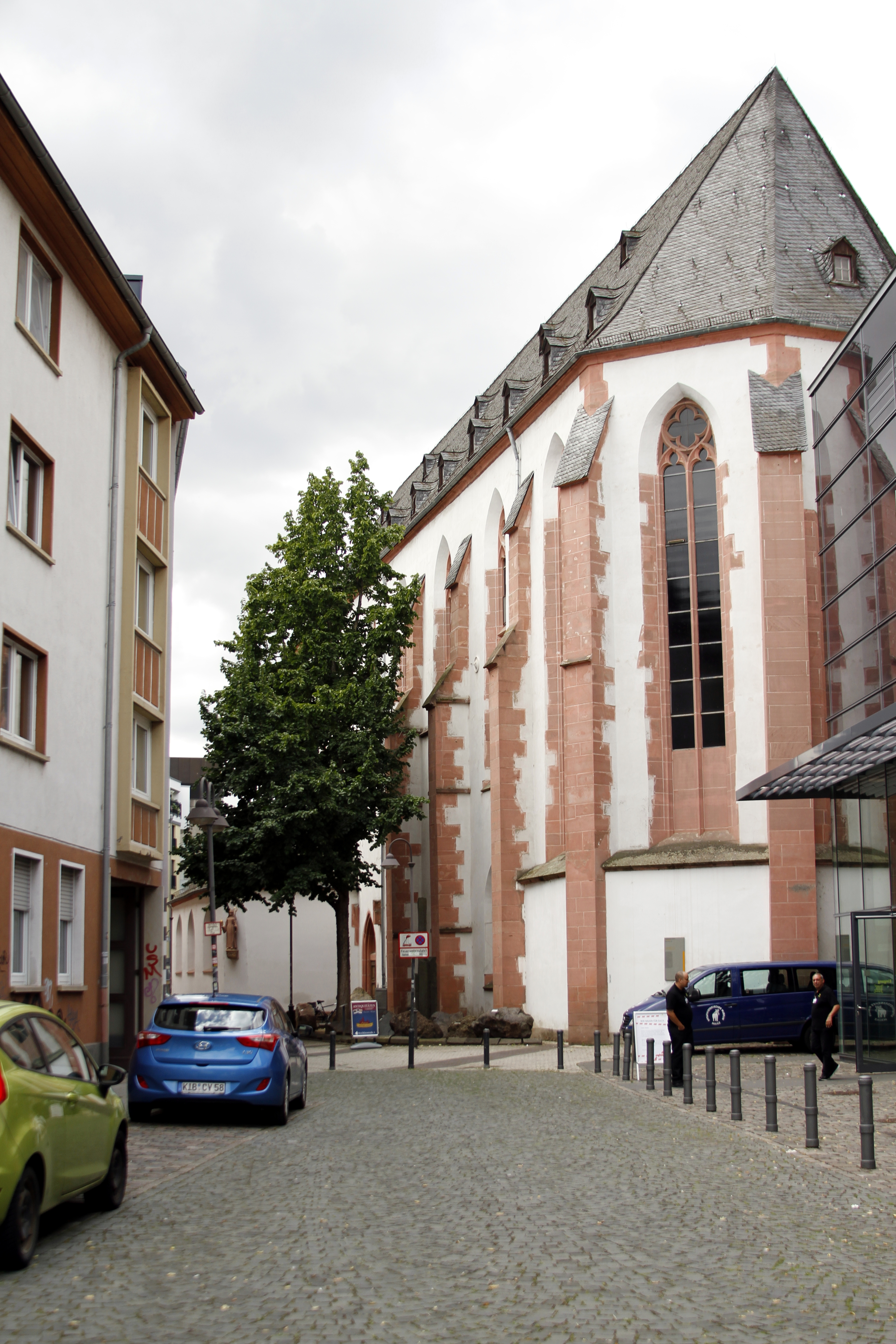
The former St. Clara monastery in Mainz

Adelheid was the daughter of Count Diether IV of Katzenelnbogen and Hildegunde. She married before 1250 to Count Walram II of Nassau (c. 1220 – 24 January 1276). On 16 December 1255, her spouse divided the county of Nassau with his younger brother Otto I, on which occasion Walram obtained the area south of the river Lahn, containing Wiesbaden, Idstein, Weilburg and Bleidenstadt.

=== Issue ===
From this union came the following children:

1. Diether (c. 1250 – Trier, 23 November 1307), was Archbishop of Trier 1300-1307.
2. Adolf (c. 1255 – Göllheim, 2 July 1298), succeeded his father as count of Nassau, was King of Germany 1292-1298.
3. Richardis (died 28 July 1311), was a nun in the St. Clara monastery in Mainz and later in Klarenthal Abbey near Wiesbaden.
4. Matilda (died young).
5. Imagina (died before 1276), may have married Frederick of Lichtenberg.

Walram died – allegedly in mental derangement – on 24 January 1276. As a widow, Adelheid was a Clarissan nun in Wiesbaden (in the summer) and in Mainz (in the winter). It is believed that Adelheid and her daughter Richardis led a very devout life.

The necrology of the St. Clara monastery in Mainz recorded the death of ‘Alheidis … comitissa de Nassowe’ on ‘Non Kal Mar’ in 1288, and her burial ‘in habitu soror’. So she died on 22 February 1288 and was buried in the St. Clara monastery in Mainz.

== Sources ==
- This article was translated from the corresponding Dutch Wikipedia article, as of 2019-10-30.
- Dek, A.W.E. (1970). Genealogie van het Vorstenhuis Nassau [Genealogy of the Royal House of Nassau] (in Dutch). Zaltbommel: Europese Bibliotheek. OCLC 27365371.
- Huberty, Michel; Giraud, Alain; Magdelaine, F. & B. (1981). l'Allemagne Dynastique. Tome III Brunswick-Nassau-Schwarzbourg [German Dynasties. Volume III Brunswick-Nassau-Schwarzburg] (in French). Le Perreux: Alain Giraud.
- Sauer, Wilhelm (1896). "Graf Walram II. von Nassau" [Count Walram II of Nassau]. Allgemeine Deutsche Biographie [Universal German Biography] (in German). Vol. Band 40. Leipzig: Duncker & Humblot. pp. 778–779.
- Vorsterman van Oyen, A.A. (1882). Het vorstenhuis Oranje-Nassau. Van de vroegste tijden tot heden [The Royal House of Orange-Nassau. From the earliest days until the present] (in Dutch). Leiden & Utrecht: A.W. Sijthoff & J.L. Beijers.
