= Bohemond I (archbishop of Trier) =

- Archbishop of Trier
- Church: Catholic Church
- Diocese: Archdiocese of Trier
- In office: 1286–1299

Personal details
- Died: 9 December 1299

Bohemond of Warnesberg (died 9 December 1299) was the Archbishop of Trier (as Bohemond I) and a Prince Elector of the Holy Roman Empire from 1286 to his death.

He achieved high religious postings in both Trier and Metz before being selected to replace Henry of Finstingen as archbishop in the former. Chosen by Pope Nicholas IV, he did not receive his confirmation in Rome until 6 March 1289, after three years during which two of his competitors had died and the third, Gerard II of Eppstein had been received the mitre in Mainz.

He was a man of letters and a knight, concerned for both the spiritual and saecular health of his underlings. He had a high reputation with his fellow princes, but was unable to impose his will on those of his cathedral chapter who opposed him. When the pope appointed Peter von Aspelt and Johannes Gylet cathedral canons, Bohemond opposed them because they were not locals. Even a papal interdict did not cause him to relent.

When King Rudolf I of Germany desired to make his son Albert crowned in his lifetime to ensure his succession, Bohemond readily crowned him. On Rudolf's death in 1291, however, Siegfried of Cologne and the aforementioned Gerard of Mainz forced him to change his vote and elect Adolf of Nassau as king. After Adolf's coronation, Bohemond remained faithful to him and negotiated for him in Flanders between the English and the French. He prepared an army to fight against Albert, but on hearing the news of Adolf's death at the Battle of Göllheim, he transferred his allegiance to Albert. He received gifts of property from Philip IV of France, Edward I of England, and, most importantly, Albert himself, who gave him the castle of Cochem, originally pawned by Adolf to be a hereditary possession of the church of Trier. Bohemond died in Trier and was buried in the monastery of Himmerode, which he particularly loved.

== Sources ==
- Gesta Trevirorum

Bohemond of Warnesberg Born: unknown Died: 9 December 1299 in Trier
Catholic Church titles
Regnal titles
Preceded by Henry of Finst(r)ingen (Fénétrange)	Archbishop- Elector of Trier as Bohemond I 1286–1299	Succeeded by Diether of Nassau
