= Diether of Nassau =

Diether III
- Archbishop and Elector of Trier
- Church: Catholic Church
- Diocese: Archdiocese of Trier
- In office: 1300–1307
- Predecessor: Bohemond I of Warnesberg
- Successor: Baldwin of Luxembourg

Personal details
- Born: c. 1250
- Died: 23 November 1307 Trier

Diether of Nassau, German: Diether von Nassau (c. 1250 – Trier, 23 November 1307) was a clergyman from the Walramian branch of the House of Nassau. From 1300 to 1307 he was Archbishop and Elector of Trier as Diether III.

== Life ==
Diether was the eldest son of Count Walram II of Nassau and Adelheid of Katzenelnbogen. It is believed that after his father died in 1276, Diether's mother and sister led a very devout life at Klarenthal Abbey in Wiesbaden. His younger brother, Count Adolf of Nassau, was elected King of Germany in 1292 and died in 1298 in the Battle of Göllheim.

Diether was a Dominican at Mainz since 1292, and a Doctor of Theology. Later, as archbishop, he supported the Dominican Order energetically.

From 1295 Diether was in the service of Pope Boniface VIII. Not only did Boniface VIII occasionally use Diether to influence King Adolf; Diether was also sent by Adolf as a negotiator to King Philip IV "the Fair" of France in 1297 when Adolf, in exploring the state of his alliance with King Edward I of England, thought he could achieve political double play.

=== Archbishop-Elector of Trier ===
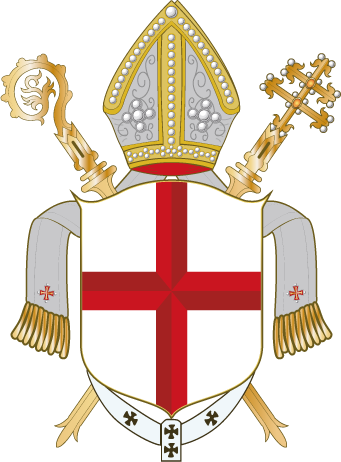
Coat of Arms of the Archdiocese of Trier

Although the chapter of the Cathedral of Trier had elected Henry II of Virneburg, the provost of the Cathedral of Cologne, for political reasons the Pope elevated Diether to Archbishop of Trier on 18 January 1300. It was the intention of the Pope to appoint an irreconcilable opponent, due to the death of Diethers brother Adolf, to King Albert I. Diether had to sacrifice himself for this policy.

Diether had Ramstein Castle built in 1300 and fortified castles in other places. In the same year he granted town privileges to Wittlich. In 1302 he founded the collegiate church Liebfrauenkirche in Oberwesel.

The so-called Toll War led by King Albert I, against the alliance of the four electors from the Rhineland, in 1301, first required Count Palatine Rudolf I of the Rhine, and then the archbishops Gerhard II of Mainz and Wigbold I of Cologne to submit. In November 1302, Albert also advanced to Trier and forced Diether, who was abandoned by his country, to a humble peace.

Diether's government was characterized by conflicts with the cathedral chapter, the clergy, and the subjects. The city of Trier suffered from financial difficulties, and there was a power struggle between the estates of the realm in other cities of the Electorate. In the spring of 1303, after an uprising of the guilds, Diether had to allow the city of Trier complete freedom of the municipal administration. From 1276 the inhabitants of Koblenz sought more independence, even established a city council and in 1280 prevented further construction of the city walls and castle. In 1304 Diether subdued the city after fierce fighting and Koblenz had to give up the city council from then on.
As a result of the war with King Albert I, the financial situation of Diether was already very bad, now it became considerably worse.

Diether also made enemies in the church. After all the possessions and income of the Archdiocese had been pledged, he confiscated property and income from parish churches and, in 1303, had himself paid by the cathedral chapter for concessions. In 1306, after he also began to take relics in private possession, the chapters of the cathedral, St. Simeon's and St. Paulinus', as well as St. Maximin's Abbey, complained to Pope Clement V. The Pope ordered Diether to defend himself against the allegations, which he however did not. He also treated the papal legate badly, which was followed by excommunication and later suspension.

Diether died at Trier on 23 November 1307, before he could fulfill further requests to account for himself to the Pope. He left his country in great confusion and burdened with debts. He was buried in the church of the Dominican abbey. That church was destroyed in 1812.

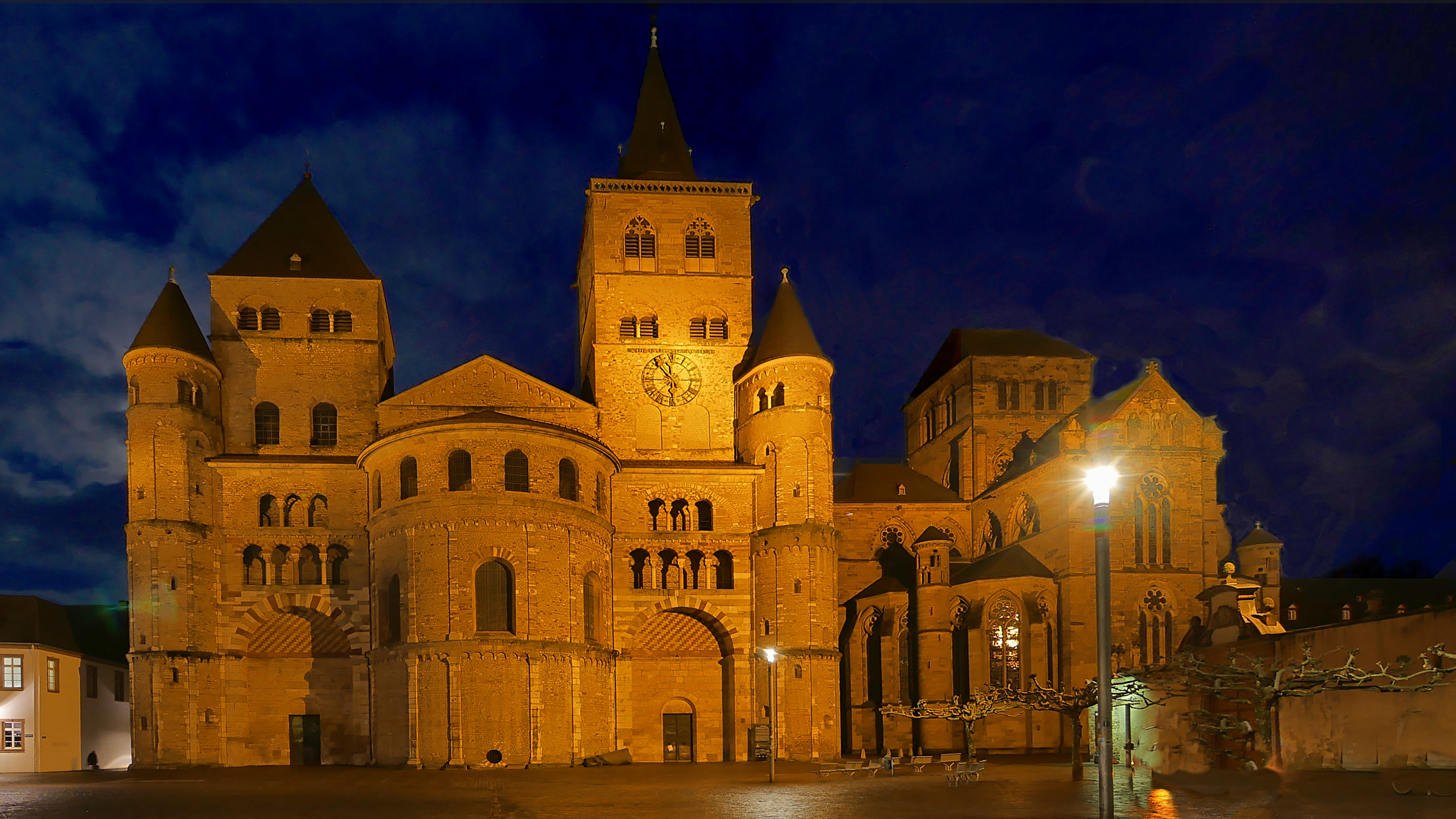
The Cathedral of Trier

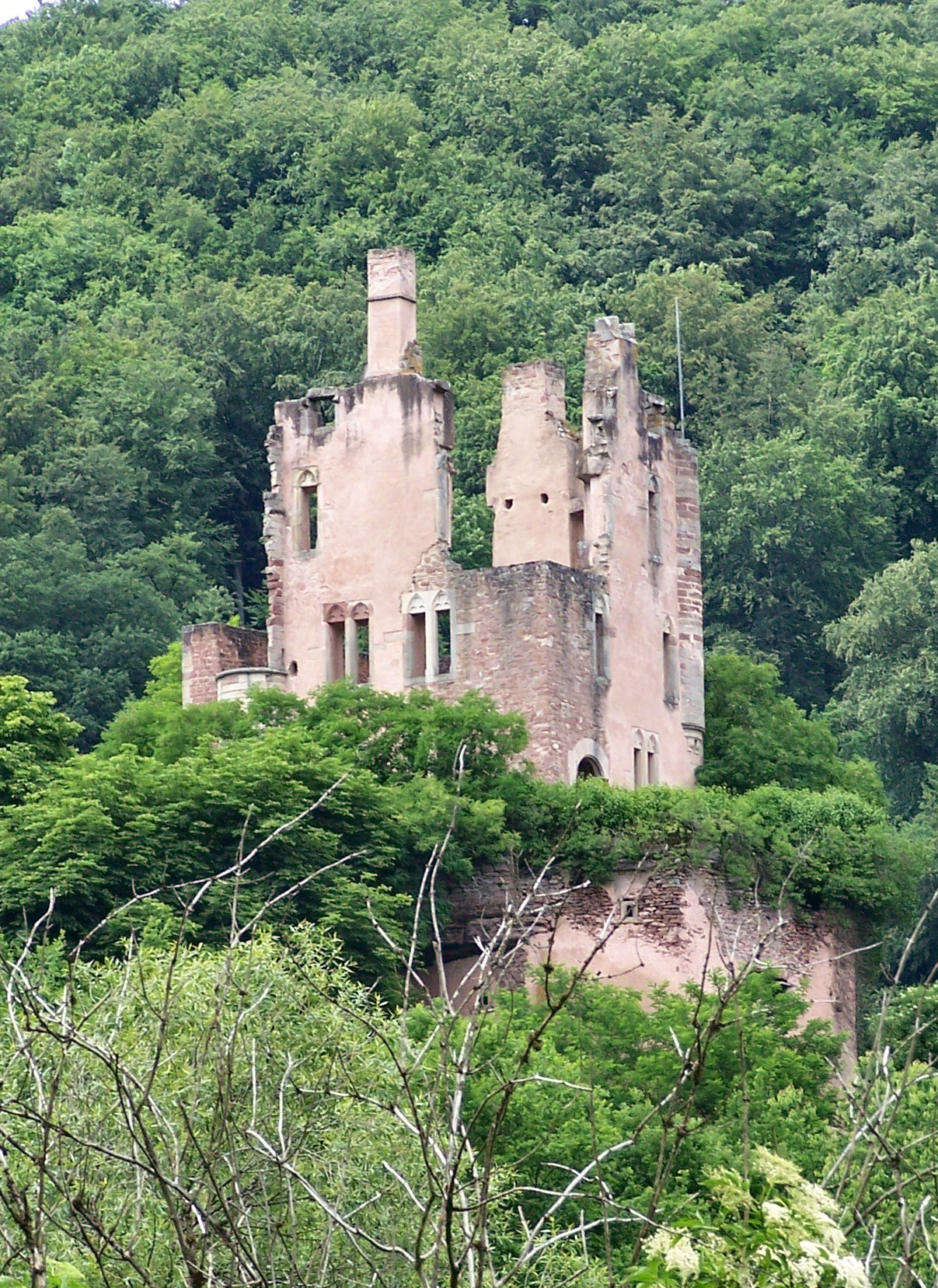
Ramstein Castle

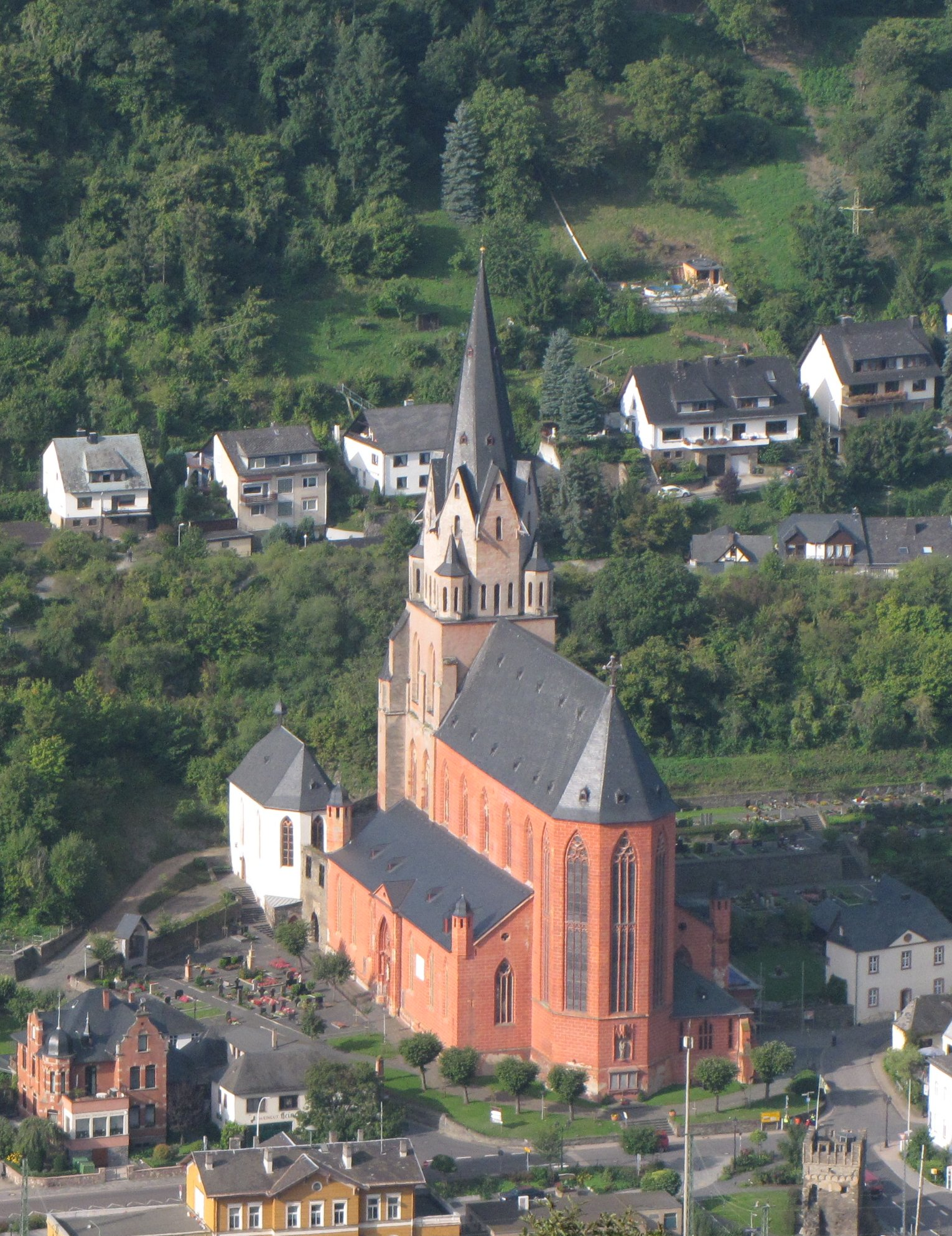
The Liebfrauenkirche in Oberwesel

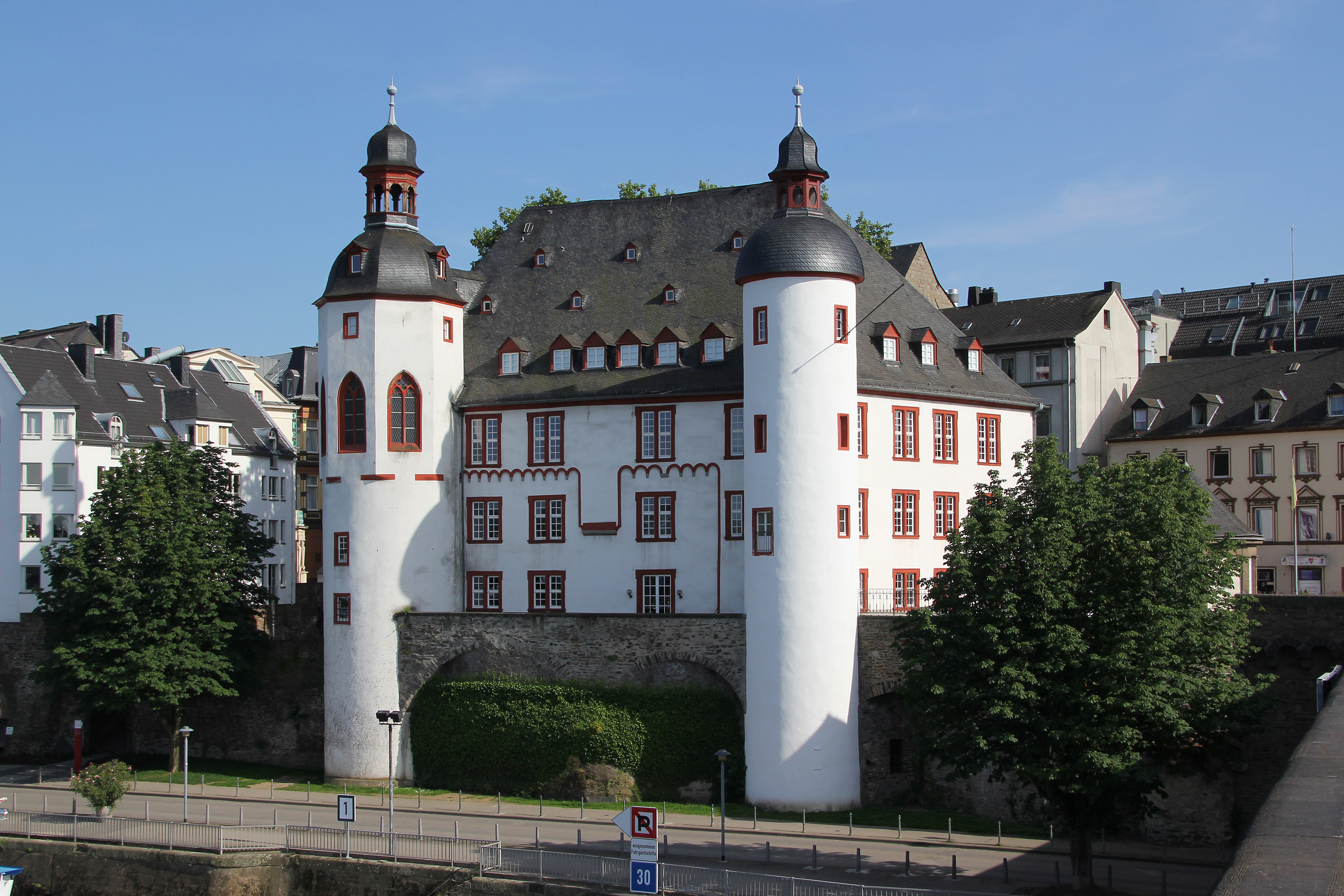
The Old Castle in Koblenz

== Sources ==
- Conrad, Joachim. Nassau Dieter von in: Saarland Biografien (in German).
- Dek, A.W.E. (1970). Genealogie van het Vorstenhuis Nassau (in Dutch). Zaltbommel: Europese Bibliotheek. OCLC 27365371.
- von Eltester, Leopold (1877). Diether von Nassau in: Allgemeine Deutsche Biographie Band 5 (in German). Leipzig: Duncker & Humblot, p. 170-171.
- Gauert, Adolf (1957). Dieter in: Neue Deutsche Biographie Band 3 (in German). Berlin: Duncker & Humblot, p. 668-669. ISBN 3-428-00184-2.
- Ost, Sandra (2006). Diether von Nassau in: Biographisch-Bibliographisches Kirchenlexikon Band 26 (in German), Nordhausen: Bautz, p. 267–271. ISBN 3-88309-354-8.
- Vorsterman van Oyen, A.A. (1882). Het vorstenhuis Oranje-Nassau. Van de vroegste tijden tot heden (in Dutch). Leiden & Utrecht: A.W. Sijthoff & J.L. Beijers.

Diether of Nassau Born: c. 1250 Died: 23 November 1307 in Trier
Catholic Church titles
Regnal titles
Preceded by Bohemond I of Warnesberg	Archbishop-Elector of Trier as Diether III; 1300–1307	Succeeded by Baldwin of Luxembourg
