= Klarenthal =

- Borough of Wiesbaden
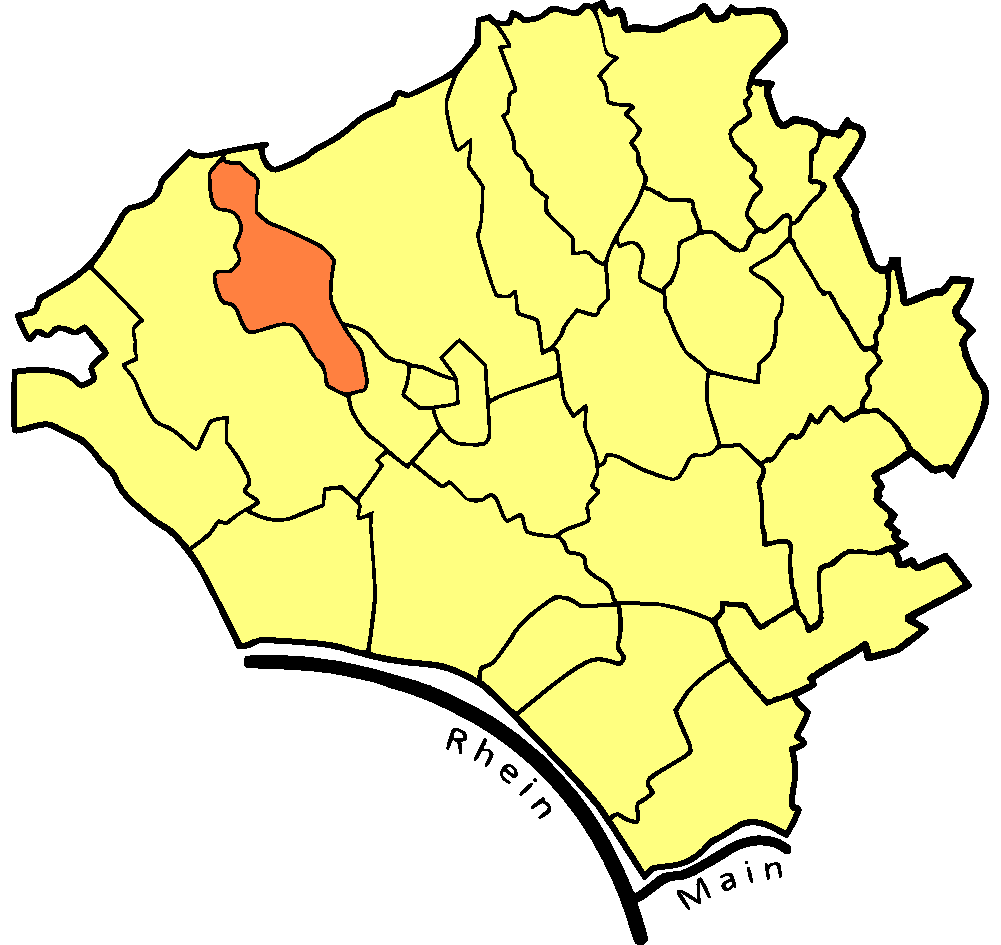
- Location of Klarenthal in Wiesbaden
- Interactive map of Klarenthal
- Location within Germany Location within Hesse
- Coordinates: 50°5′15″N 8°11′55″E
- Country: Germany
- State: Hesse
- District: Urban district
- City: Wiesbaden

Government
  - Mayor: Gunther Ludwig (SPD)

Area
  - Total: 6.13 km^{2} (2.37 sq mi)
- Elevation: 287.5 m (943 ft)

Population (2020-12-31)
  - Total: 10,704
  - Density: 1,750/km^{2} (4,520/sq mi)
- Time zone: UTC+01:00 (CET)
  - Summer (DST): UTC+02:00 (CEST)
- Postal codes: 65197
- Dialling codes: 0611
- Vehicle registration: WI
- Website: www.wiesbaden.de/klarenthal

Klarenthal is a borough of Wiesbaden, capital of the federal state of Hesse, Germany. The community, situated on the slopes of the Taunus Mountains, was planned by architect and urban planner Ernst May in the style of a commuter town in the early 1960s. It was built on free arable land between the railway line to Bad Schwalbach and Klarenthaler Straße, overlooking the city center of Wiesbaden proper. Klarenthal consists mainly of large multi-family homes and residential high-rise buildings, surrounded with much green space, as well as many townhouses. The ground-breaking ceremony was held on September 11, 1964, and the first residents moved in in late February 1966. Today, over 10,000 people live there.

The name comes from the medieval Kloster Klarenthal (Klarenthal Monastery), which was located nearby on the edge of today's settlement, in Wellritztal. The monastery was established by Count Adolf of Nassau (born before 1250; died July 2, 1298), who was elected King of Germany on May 5, 1292. The monastery was to serve as a tomb for the House of Nassau, and his wife Queen Imagina and many of his descendants were buried here. Kloster Klarenthal was the only monastery of the city of Wiesbaden. Its nuns belonged to the Order of Poor Ladies (also known as the Order of Saint Clare or the Poor Clares), which was founded by Clare of Assisi, hence the name Klarenthal. The monastery was secularized in 1559, after the Protestant Reformation. Only a few buildings are still preserved today.

== Coat of arms ==
Klarenthal's coat of arms is the youngest in Wiesbaden. It could not be based on any historical seal because the settlement of Klarenthal was only built in the 1960s by plans of Ernst May. When the desire for a unique crest for the borough came in the mid-1980s, a heraldic proposed that it should picture St. Clare, together with a lamp as a symbol of the history of the settlement. The borough council, however, also wanted to add the silhouette of a newly built house. This design was eventually discarded as far too complicated.

Other consultants advised them that St. Clare herself should not be pictured; only her attributes were suitable for a coat of arms. Suggested attributes included the rule book, a lily, a cross, a burning lamp and a monstrance. The lily and book were quickly rejected, since the lily is already the symbol of the City of Wiesbaden and the coat of arms from Nordenstadt contains a book.

The lamp was finally chosen because it directly related to St. Clare – “Clare” is Latin for "the Light." To continue with the connected to the name "Klarenthal", a symbol of a valley was also proposed. The classical heraldic symbol is a so-called "supporting rafters", which looks roughly like the letter "V". This symbol is also included in the coat of arms of Schierstein. Finally, the colors blue and gold were chosen. These were the national colors of Nassau, recalling that the Klarenthal Monastery was founded by Adolf of Nassau. It was officially adopted in November 1988.

== Politics ==
Election results and the distribution of seats in borough council (Ortsbeirat) of Klarenthal are as follows:

Political parties	% 2006	Seats; 2006	% 2001	Seats; 2001	% 1997
Social Democratic Party of Germany	43.5	5	38.8	4	46.6
Christian Democratic Union	33.7	3	35.7	4	38.9
Free Democratic Party	8.4	1	16.7	2	4.2
The Republicans	7.7	1	7.0	1	0
Alliance '90/The Greens	6.7	1	1.7	0	10.2
Total	100.0	11	100.0	11	100.0
Voter turnout in %	36.9		49.1		62.3

== Social infrastructure ==
Klarenthal has a social infrastructure, composed of the two churches, schools, numerous clubs and other social institutions, as well as an borough council (Ortsbeirat), committed to the cohesion and well-being of the neighborhood residents.

== Religious life ==
=== Lutheran community ===
The first Protestant inhabitants of the settlement were members of Kreuzkirche (Cross Church). On April 1, 1968, Klarenthal became a separate parish. In 1969, Walter Wenzel came as the first pastor. On May 20, 1969, the first ecumenical church service of the Klarenthal Lutheran Church was held in the old chapel of Klarenthal. There were (with the priest) ten visitors.

Built in 1972, the community center was the first phase of construction of the church's planned facilities. The second phase of construction was repeatedly postponed, so that its inauguration was not until the fourth Sunday of Advent in 1986. The church is an architecturally interesting round building, joined idiosyncratically and yet harmoniously to the cubes of the buildings of the first construction phase. The interior space of the church can be varied, in order to facilitate newer forms of worship or traditional Sunday worship services.

=== Roman Catholic community ===
Klarenthal is, appropriately, in the parish of Sankt Klara.

== Recreation ==
The city benefits from being on the edge of a large recreation area with much greenery, good air and miles of walking trails. Other attractions include the Fasanerie, an animal and plant park; and the annual "Klarenthaler Kulturtage" (culture days) and the Klarenthaler Sommerfest (summer festival).

=== Sports ===
Klarenthal has several clubs engaged in organized athletic activities. The largest, with about 700 members, is 1. SC Klarenthal 1968 eV. Other sports clubs include the Wiesbadener Fechtclub 1879 e.V. (fencing club) and the Wiesbadener Schützengesellschaft 1843-1860 e. V. (shooting club).

SC Klarenthal is involved in nine sports, including organized teams in football, volleyball, and table tennis. It has 22 youth teams in these sports, as well as master and senior level team. Its women's volleyball team competes in the Hessian Landesliga Süd. It also offers gymnastics classes for Mother and Child, children, and seniors and Jazz dance for children. Its facilities include a football pitch, two beach volleyball courts, three tennis courts, and a gymnasium (Turnhalle).

=== Fasanerie Zoo and Botanical Gardens ===
The Fasanerie Zoo and Botanical Gardens, with an area of 18 hectares, is situated between Aar Strasse and Klarenthaler Strasse. It offers a home to around 50 types of animals, including many indigenous wild and domesticated animals, including domestic pig, wolves, foxes, and probably the best-known animals at present, the bears Ronja, Troxi II, and Kuno. The gardens include meadows, woods and water, as well as exotic and indigenous plants. The Fasanerie is open daily and admission is free. No dogs are allowed.

The "Förderverein Fasanerie e.V." (the supporters' association of the Fasanerie) and the "Naturpädagogische Zentrum" (the nature teaching center) host natural history tours for young and old which communicate about types of animals and plants to children and young people in a lively way. About 70 events take place in the Fasanerie each year.
