= Gerlach I =

Gerlach I may refer to:

- Gerlach I, Count of Nassau (before 1288 – 1361)
- Gerlach I of Isenburg-Wied, Count of Isenburg-Wied from 1409 until 1413
- Gerlach I of Isenburg-Arnfels (died 1303), Count of Isenburg-Arnfels from 1286 (1287) until 1303
