= Prima divisio =

1255 treaty dividing the County of Nassau

Prima Divisio (Latin for first division) is the term used by historians for the Family Treaty from 1255 containing the first division of the county of Nassau between the brothers Walram II and Otto I.

== History ==
The coat of arms of the county of Nassau

In the old succession laws a kingdom/duchy/county was considered to be the personal property of the king/duke/count. At the death of the ruler his property was inherited by all his sons. This is in contrast to the primogeniture that was introduced later, where the firstborn legitimate son inherits everything. The sons could jointly rule the inherited land or divide it into equal parts. It will come as no surprise that both the co-rule of a country as well as the division of a country into equal parts often resulted in conflicts. Such conflicts regularly led to wars of succession.

== The division treaty ==
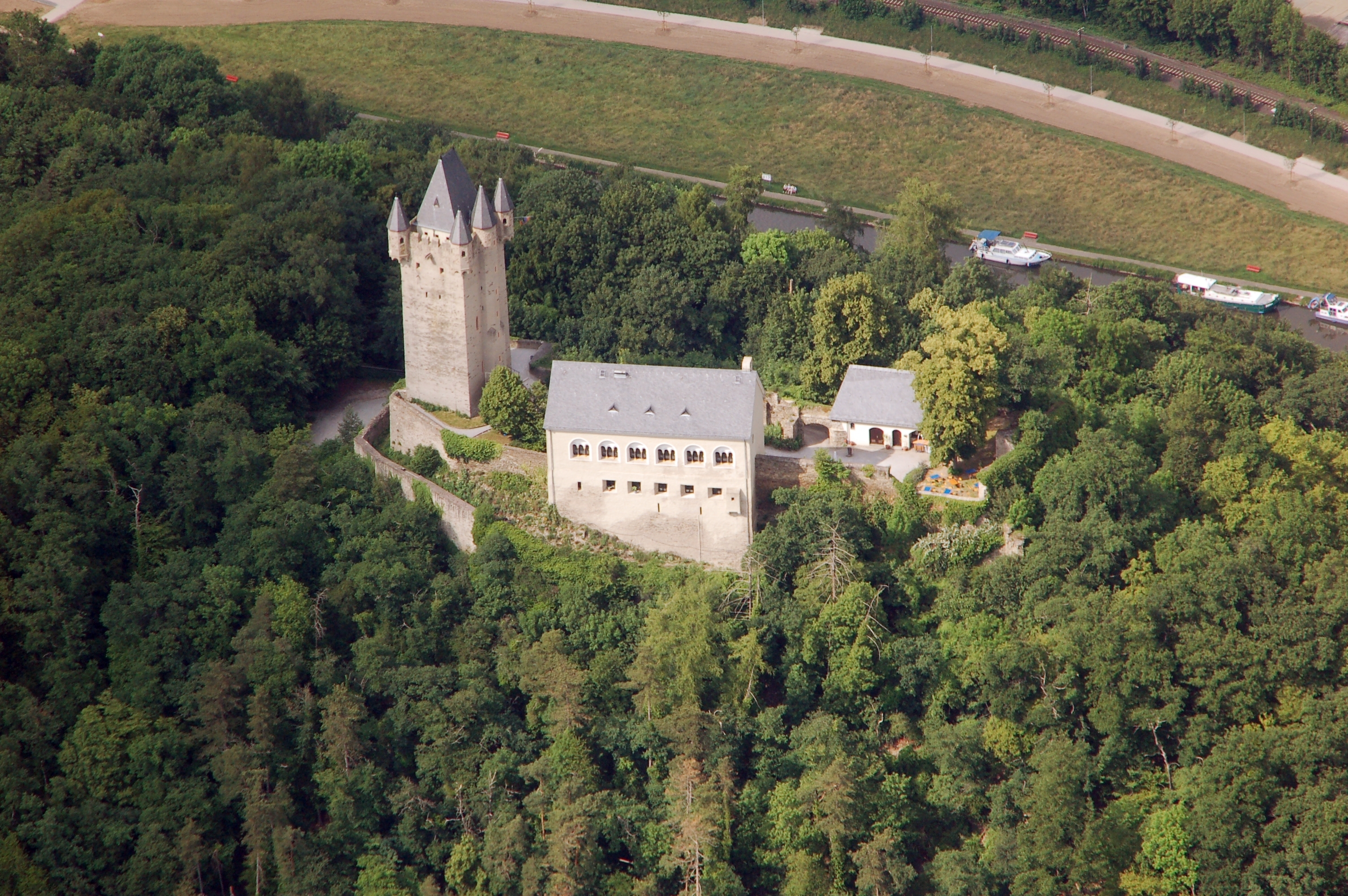
Nassau Castle

The division treaty was signed on 16 December 1255 by the plenipotentiaries of Walram and Otto in Nassau Castle. The county was divided into two equal parts with the river Lahn as the border.

The division was as follows:

- The area north of the Lahn: the lordships Siegen, Dillenburg, Herborn, Tringenstein, Neukirch and Emmerichenhain, a part of the Kalenberger Zent (Amt Kalenberg), as well as Dietkirchen and (Bad) Ems, was assigned to Otto.
- The area south of the Lahn: the lordships Wiesbaden, Idstein, the Ämter Weilburg (with the Wehrholz) and Bleidenstadt, was assigned to Walram.
- Nassau Castle and dependencies (Dreiherrische), the Ämter Miehlen and Schönau (Schönau Abbey near Strüth über Nastätten) as well as the Vierherrengericht, Laurenburg Castle, the Esterau (which was jointly owned with the counts of Diez) and the fiefs in Hesse remained jointly owned.

Later, perhaps shortly after the conclusion of the division treaty, Walram expressed dissatisfaction with some provisions of the treaty and challenged them. Whether he was already acting under the influence of the mental illness from which he suffered is unknown. What is certain is that in an attack of insanity he burned his copy of the division treaty.

Otto's original copy of the division treaty has been preserved. It is kept in the Royal House Archive in The Hague. It was exhibited in Vianden Castle between 25 May and 19 August 2018.

== Effects of the division ==
Since the division, the House of Nassau has been divided into two branches: the Walramian branch and the Ottonian branch, named after the two founders. There have been other divisions later which have all been undone by the extinction of family branches, but the first division still exists today. Walram became the ancestor of the Grand Dukes of Luxembourg and Otto became the ancestor of the Kings of the Netherlands.

The current heads of the Walramian and Ottonian branches, Grand Duke Henri of Luxembourg and King Willem-Alexander of the Netherlands, and their wives, viewed the original copy of the Prima Divisio exhibited at Vianden Castle at the opening of the exhibition on 24 May 2018.

== Sources ==
- This article was translated from the corresponding Dutch Wikipedia article, as of 2019-08-30.
- Ausfeld, Eduard (1887). "Otto I., Graf von Nassau" [Otto I, Count of Nassau]. Allgemeine Deutsche Biographie [Universal German Biography] (in German). Vol. Band 24. Leipzig: Duncker & Humblot. p. 707.
- Becker, E. (1983) [1950]. Schloss und Stadt Dillenburg. Ein Gang durch ihre Geschichte in Mittelalter und Neuzeit. Zur Gedenkfeier aus Anlaß der Verleihung der Stadtrechte am 20. September 1344 herausgegeben [Castle and City Dillenburg. A Journey through their History in Medieval and Modern Times. Published to celebrate the grant of Town Privileges on 20 September 1344] (in German) (2nd ed.). Dillenburg: Der Magistrat der Stadt Dillenburg.
- Dek, A.W.E. (1970). Genealogie van het Vorstenhuis Nassau [Genealogy of the Royal House of Nassau] (in Dutch). Zaltbommel: Europese Bibliotheek. OCLC 27365371.
- Huberty, Michel; Giraud, Alain; Magdelaine, F. & B. (1981). l'Allemagne Dynastique. Tome III Brunswick-Nassau-Schwarzbourg [German Dynasties. Volume III Brunswick-Nassau-Schwarzburg] (in French). Le Perreux: Alain Giraud.
- Lück, Alfred (1981) [1967]. Siegerland und Nederland [Siegerland and The Netherlands] (in German) (2nd ed.). Siegen: Siegerländer Heimatverein e.V.
- Sauer, Wilhelm (1896). "Graf Walram II. von Nassau" [Count Walram II of Nassau]. Allgemeine Deutsche Biographie [Universal German Biography] (in German). Vol. Band 40. Leipzig: Duncker & Humblot. pp. 778–779.
- Schliephake, F.W. Theodor (1866). Geschichte der Grafen von Nassau. Von den ältesten Zeiten bis auf die Gegenwart. Auf der Grundlage urkundlicher Quellenforschung [History of the Counts of Nassau. From the earliest times until modern times. Based on sources research in charters] (in German). Vol. Band 1. Wiesbaden: C.W. Kreidel & Niedner.
- Spielmann, Christian (1909). Geschichte von Nassau (Land und Haus) von den ältesten Zeiten bis zur Gegenwart. Teil 1. Politische Geschichten [History of Nassau (Country and House) from the earliest times until modern times. Part 1. Political History] (in German). Wiesbaden: P. Plauen.
- Vorsterman van Oyen, A.A. (1882). Het vorstenhuis Oranje-Nassau. Van de vroegste tijden tot heden [The Royal House of Orange-Nassau. From the earliest days until the present] (in Dutch). Leiden & Utrecht: A.W. Sijthoff & J.L. Beijers.
- Witzleben, Arwied von (1854). Genealogie und Geschichte des gesammten Fürstenhauses Nassau, Königlich Niederländisches und Herzoglich Nassauisches Haus von den alten bis zu den neuesten Zeiten [Genealogy and History of the Complete Royal House of Nassau, Royal Dutch and Ducal Nassau House from the oldest until the newest times] (in German). Stuttgart: Ed. Hallberger.
