= Imagina of Isenburg-Limburg =

Queen of Germany from 1292 to 1298

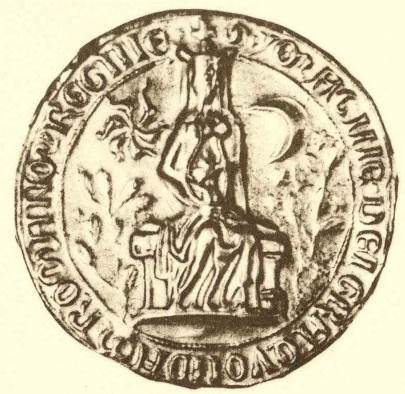
- Seal of Imagina of Isenburg-Limburg

Queen consort of Germany
- Tenure: 2 June 1292 – 2 July 1298
- Born: ca. 1255
- Died: 29 September 1313
- Spouse: Adolf, King of the Romans
- Issue: Heinrich; Ruprecht; Gerlach I, Count of Nassau; Adolf; Walram III of Nassau-Wiesbaden; Adelheid; Imagina; Mechthild of Nassau
- House: Limburg
- Father: Gerlach IV of Isenburg-Limburg
- Mother: Imagina of Blieskastel

Imagina of Isenburg-Limburg (ca. 1255 – 29 September 1313?) was the Queen consort of Adolf of Nassau, King of Germany.

== Life ==
Imagina was born in about 1255 (probably in Limburg an der Lahn) to Gerlach I of Limburg and Imagina of Blieskastel. Her father, from the House of Limburg (a collateral line of the House of Isenburg) held power over Limburg an der Lahn. Her paternal grandparents were Henry I of Isenburg-Grenzau and his wife Irmingard of Büdingen, Countess of Cleberg.

In 1270, she married Count Adolf of Nassau, from the Walramian Line of the House of Nassau. Their main residences were Idstein Castle and Sonnenberg Castle. After the election of Adolf in 1292 as King of Germany, she resided mainly in the Reichsburg Achalm when she did not accompany her husband on his travels.

After the death of her husband in the Battle of Göllheim, Imagina had the Early Gothic "King's Cross" erected on the battlefield. In 1309, she witnessed the transfer of her husband's remains from Rosenthal Abbey (in present-day Kerzenheim) to the Speyer Cathedral.

Imagina survived her husband by almost two decades but never remarried. For her widow's seat, Imagina initially took Weilburg Castle, and later moved to Klarenthal Abbey near Wiesbaden, where their daughter Adelheid presided as abbess. Imagina died at Klarenthal Abbey on 29 September 1313 and was buried there.

== Children ==
Imagina's marriage with Adolf produced at least eight children:

1. Heinrich, died young.
2. Ruprecht, died 2 December 1304
3. Gerlach I of Nassau-Wiesbaden.
4. Adolf (1292–1294).
5. Walram III of Nassau-Wiesbaden.
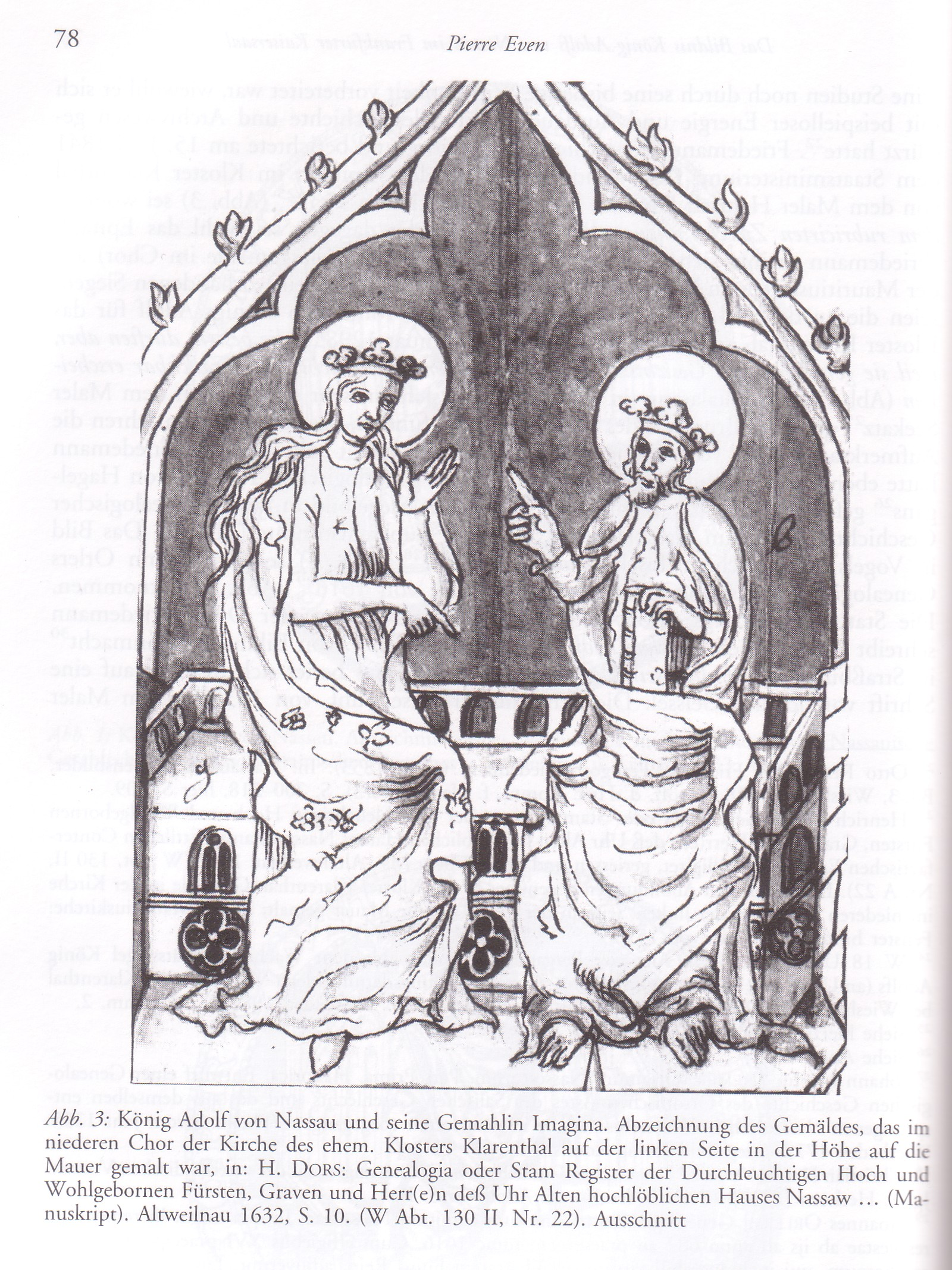
  King Adolf of Nassau and his wife Imagina of Isenburg-Limburg. Mural at Klarenthal Abbey, drawing by H. Dors, 1632
6. Adelheid, Abbess of Klarenthal Abbey, died 26 May 1338.
7. Imagina, died young.
8. Matilde (before 1280 – 19 June 1323, in Heidelberg), married Rudolf I "the Stammerer", Duke of Upper Bavaria.

== Sources ==
A. Ullrich, Die Landes- und Kirchengeschichte des Herzogthums Nassau von den ältesten Zeiten bis zur Reformation in übersichtlichem Zusammenhang, 2nd Edition. Wiesbaden, 1862. (in German).

Royal titles
Preceded by Isabelle of Burgundy	Queen of Germany; 2 June 1292 – 2 July 1298	Succeeded by Elisabeth of Tirol
