= Walram II of Nassau =

Walram II, Count of Nassau
- Born: c. 1220
- Died: 24 January 1276 (aged 55–56)
- Noble family: House of Nassau
- Spouse: Adelheid of Katzenelnbogen
- Issue: Diether; Adolf; Richardis; Matilda; Imagina
- Father: Henry II of Nassau
- Mother: Matilda of Guelders and Zutphen

Walram II of Nassau (German: Walram II. von Nassau; c. 1220 – 24 January 1276) was Count of Nassau and is the ancestor of the Walramian branch of the House of Nassau.

== Life ==
Coat of Arms of the Counts of Nassau from the Walramian branch

Walram was the second son of Count Henry II of Nassau and Matilda of Guelders and Zutphen, the youngest daughter of Count Otto I of Guelders and Zutphen and Richardis of Bavaria (herself daughter of Otto I Wittelsbach, Duke of Bavaria). Walram is first mentioned in a charter dated 20 July 1245.

Walram succeeded his father before 1251, together with his brother Otto I. They received town privileges for Herborn from the German King William in 1251.

Walram and Otto divided their county on 16 December 1255 with the river Lahn as border. The division treaty is nowadays known as the Prima divisio. The area south of the Lahn: the lordships Wiesbaden, Idstein, the Ämter Weilburg (with the Wehrholz) and Bleidenstadt, was assigned to Walram. Nassau Castle and dependencies (Dreiherrische), the Ämter Miehlen and Schönau (Schönau Abbey near Strüth über Nastätten) as well as the Vierherrengericht, Laurenburg Castle, the Esterau (which was jointly owned with the counts of Diez) and the fiefs in Hesse remained jointly owned.
Later, perhaps shortly after the conclusion of the division treaty, Walram expressed dissatisfaction with some provisions of the treaty and challenged them. Whether he was already acting under the influence of the mental illness from which he suffered is unknown. What is certain is that in an attack of insanity he burned his copy of the division treaty.

Walram was Hofmarschall and Geheimrat of King Rudolf I of Germany.

Walram lost several towns, including Niederlahnstein, Pfaffenhofen and Vallendar, to the Archbishop of Trier. He also continued the Dernbacher Feud against Hesse. He died – allegedly in mental derangement – on 24 January 1276. He was succeeded by his son Adolf.

== Marriage and children ==
Walram married before 1250 to Adelheid of Katzenelnbogen († Mainz, 22 February 1288), daughter of Count Diether IV of Katzenelnbogen and Hildegunde. As a widow Adelheid was a Clarissan nun in Wiesbaden (in the summer) and in Mainz (in the winter). She was buried in the St. Clara monastery in Mainz.
From this union came the following children:

1. Diether (c. 1250 – Trier, 23 November 1307), was Archbishop of Trier 1300-1307.
2. Adolf (c. 1255 – Göllheim, 2 July 1298), succeeded his father as count of Nassau, was King of Germany 1292-1298.
3. Richardis (died 28 July 1311), was a nun in the St. Clara monastery in Mainz and later in Klarenthal Abbey near Wiesbaden.
4. Matilda (died young).
5. Imagina (died before 1276), may have married Frederick of Lichtenberg.

== Sources ==
- Becker, E. (1983) [1950]. Schloss und Stadt Dillenburg. Ein Gang durch ihre Geschichte in Mittelalter und Neuzeit. Zur Gedenkfeier aus Anlaß der Verleihung der Stadtrechte am 20. September 1344 herausgegeben [Castle and City Dillenburg. A Journey through their History in Medieval and Modern Times. Published to celebrate the grant of Town Privileges on 20 September 1344] (in German) (2nd ed.). Dillenburg: Der Magistrat der Stadt Dillenburg.
- Dek, A.W.E. (1970). Genealogie van het Vorstenhuis Nassau [Genealogy of the Royal House of Nassau] (in Dutch). Zaltbommel: Europese Bibliotheek. OCLC 27365371.
- Huberty, Michel; Giraud, Alain; Magdelaine, F. & B. (1981). l’Allemagne Dynastique. Tome III Brunswick-Nassau-Schwarzbourg [German Dynasties. Volume III Brunswick-Nassau-Schwarzburg] (in French). Le Perreux: Alain Giraud.
- Sauer, Wilhelm (1896). "Graf Walram II. von Nassau" [Count Walram II of Nassau]. Allgemeine Deutsche Biographie [Universal German Biography] (in German). Vol. Band 40. Leipzig: Duncker & Humblot. pp. 778–779.
- Schwennicke, Detlev (1998). Europäische Stammtafeln, Neue Folge [European Genealogies, New Series] (in German). Vol. Band I. Frankfurt am Main: Vittorio Klostermann GmbH. ISBN 3-465-02743-4. Table 60.
- Thiele, Andreas (1994). Erzählende genealogische Stammtafeln zur europäischen Geschichte, Band I, Teilband 2: Deutsche Kaiser-, Königs-, Herzogs- und Grafenhäuser II [Annotated genealogies from European History, Volume 1, Part 2: German Imperial, Royal, Ducal and Comital Houses II] (in German) (2nd ed.). Frankfurt am Main: RG Fischer Verlag. ISBN 3-89501-023-5.
- Vorsterman van Oyen, A.A. (1882). Het vorstenhuis Oranje-Nassau. Van de vroegste tijden tot heden [The Royal House of Orange-Nassau. From the earliest days until the present] (in Dutch). Leiden & Utrecht: A.W. Sijthoff & J.L. Beijers.

German nobility
Preceded by Henry II	Count of Nassau before 1251–1276	Succeeded by Adolf
