= Adolf, King of the Romans =

King of Germany from 1292 to 1298

Adolf
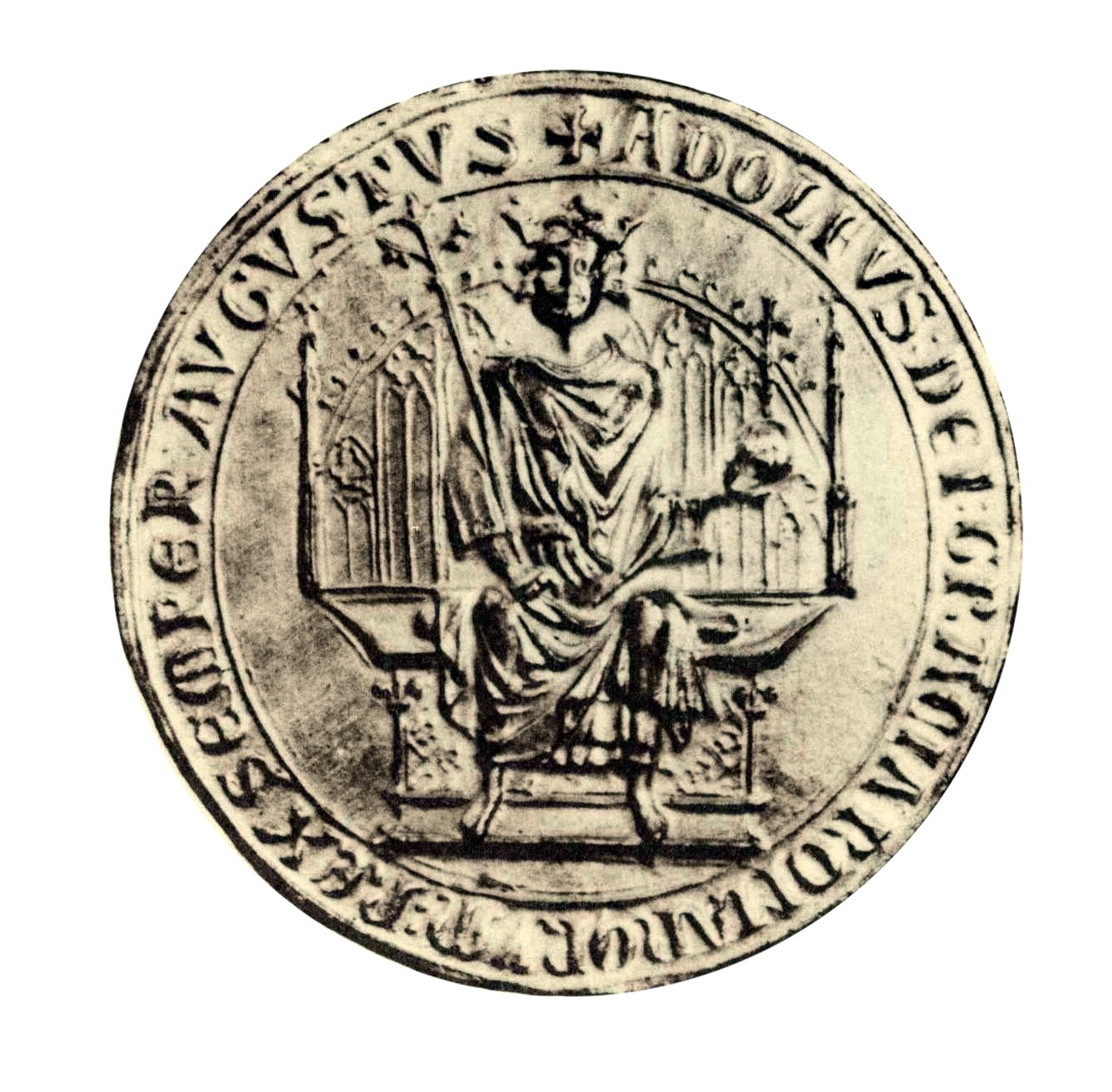
- Small throne seal of King Adolf (1298)

King of Germany (formally King of the Romans)
- Reign: 5 May 1292 – 23 June 1298
- Coronation: 24 June 1292; Aachen Cathedral
- Predecessor: Rudolf I
- Successor: Albert I

Count of Nassau
- Tenure: ca. 1276 – 2 July 1298
- Predecessor: Walram II; Otto I
- Successor: Henry I Emicho I John; Gerlach I
- Regent: Otto I (until 1290); Henry I Emicho I John
- Born: 1255
- Died: 2 July 1298 (aged 43); Göllheim, Germany
- Burial: Rosenthal Abbey, then moved to Speyer Cathedral in 1309
- Spouse: Imagina of Isenburg-Limburg
- Issue: Henry; Robert; Gerlach I, Count of Nassau; Adolf; Walram III van Nassau; Adelheid; Imagina; Mechthild, Duchess of Upper Bavaria
- House: House of Nassau
- Father: Walram II, Count of Nassau
- Mother: Adelheid of Katzenelnbogen
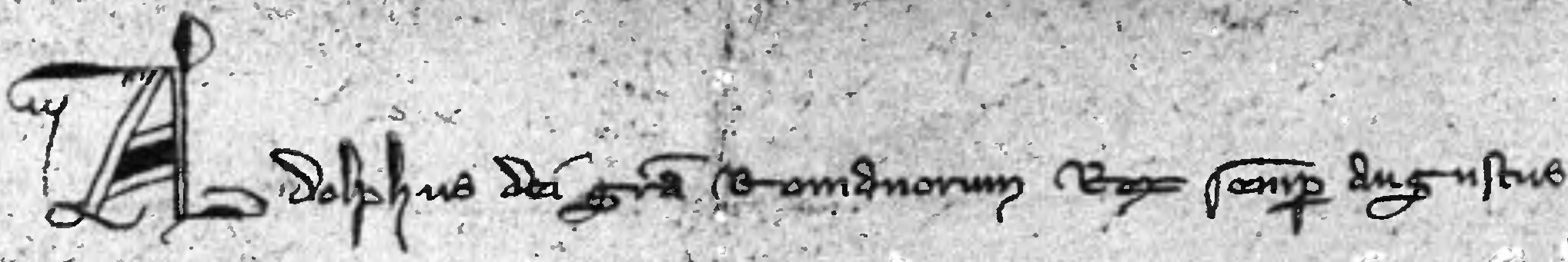
- Signature

Adolf (c. 1255 – 2 July 1298) was the count of Nassau from about 1276 and the elected king of Germany from 1292 until his deposition by the prince-electors in 1298. He was never crowned by the pope, which would have secured him the imperial title. He was the first physically and mentally healthy ruler of the Holy Roman Empire ever to be deposed without a papal excommunication. Adolf died shortly afterwards in the Battle of Göllheim fighting against his successor Albert of Habsburg.

He was the second in the succession of so-called count-kings of several rivalling comital houses striving after the Roman-German royal dignity.

== Family ==
Adolf was the reigning count of a small German state. He was born about 1255 and was the son of Walram II, Count of Nassau and Adelheid of Katzenelnbogen. Adolf’s brother was Diether of Nassau, who was appointed Archbishop of Trier in 1300.

Adolf was married in 1270 to Imagina of Isenburg-Limburg (died after 1313) and they had eight children. Agnes of Isenburg-Limburg, the sister of Imagina, was married to Henry (Heinrich) of Westerburg, the brother of Siegfried II of Westerburg, the Archbishop of Cologne.

== Career as Count of Nassau ==
Coat of Arms of the Counts of Nassau

In 1276 or 1277, Adolf followed his father as Count of Nassau. From his father, he inherited the family’s lands south of the Lahn River in the Taunus Mountains. These included Wiesbaden and Idstein, as fiefdoms, and the Vogtship in Weilburg under the Bishopric of Worms. He also shared ownership of the family homelands around the castles of Nassau and Laurenburg.

Around 1280, Adolf became involved in the Nassau-Eppstein Feud with the Lords of Eppstein, in which the city of Wiesbaden was devastated and Sonnenberg Castle destroyed. The feud was settled in 1283, after which the city and the castle were rebuilt. Sonnenberg, along with Idstein, became Adolf’s residence. He granted Idstein town privileges in 1287 and built its fortifications.

Through his uncle, Eberhard I of Katzenelnbogen, Adolf came to the court of King Rudolf I of Habsburg. King Rudolf awarded him with the Burghauptmannamt (Castle Lordship) of Kalsmunt Castle in Wetzlar and a year later that of Gutenfels Castle near Kaub (where he became a vassal of the Counts Palatine of the Rhine).

Before his election, Adolf’s political activities had been limited to his role as Bundesgenosse of the Archbishop of Cologne. Adolf had no particular office, but likely became known through his involvement with the Archbishops of Cologne and Mainz in the politics of the Middle Rhine and Mainz areas. He spoke German, French, and Latin, which was rare at that time for nobles.

After his election, King Adolf of Nassau would only rarely be in his home country, having transferred the government there to his burgmen. On 17 January 1294, he purchased Weilburg for 400 pounds from the Bishopric of Worms. He granted Weilburg town privileges on 29 December 1295. He also established the Clarisse abbey of Klarenthal near Wiesbaden in 1296.

== Election as King of the Romans ==
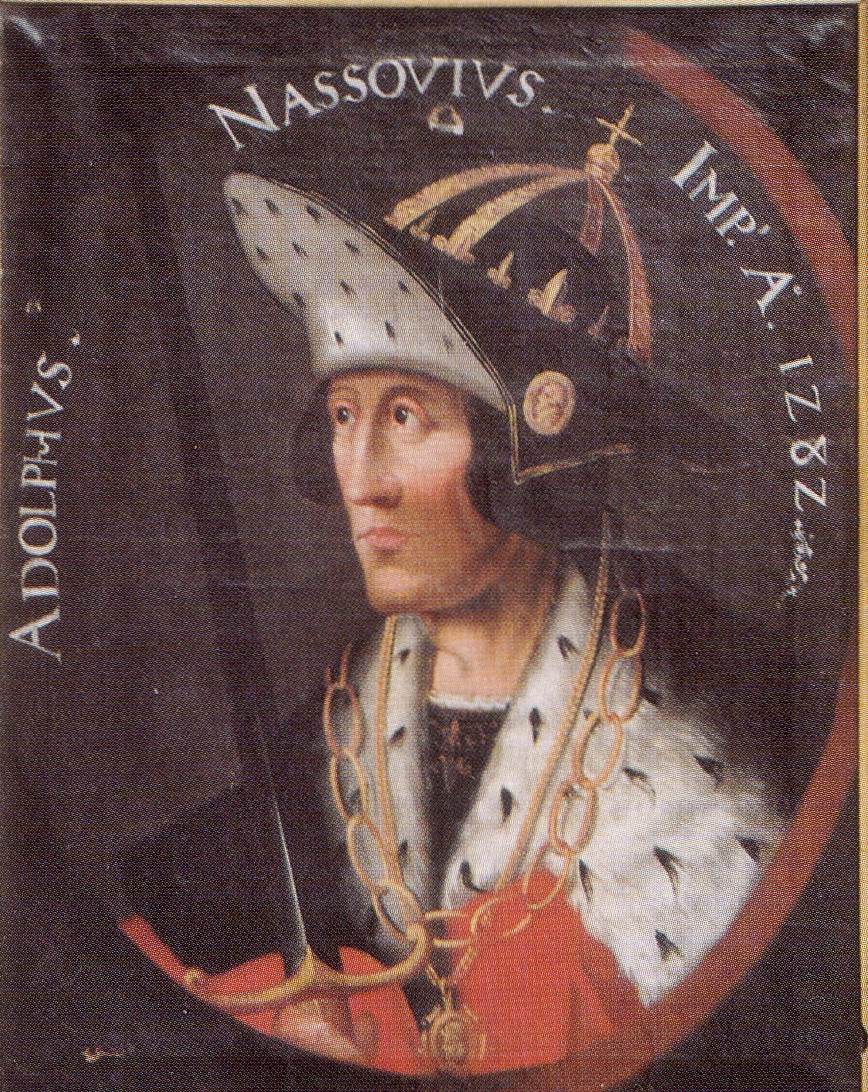
Portrait by Arnold Montanus, 1662

Rudolf I of Habsburg died on 15 July 1291. For many years before his death, Rudolf had tried to secure the election of his eldest son Albert (Albrecht) as his successor. He was thwarted, however, by the opposition of the Archbishop of Cologne, Siegfried II of Westerburg, and the King of Bohemia, Wenceslaus (Václav/Wenzel) II. Only the Count Palatine Louis II of Upper Bavaria "the Rigorous" promised to choose Albert. Wenceslaus, despite Rudolf's recognition of his electoral vote, refused to support Albert because he would not cede Carinthia to him. He took the side of the nobles in the core Habsburg areas of Swabia and in their newly acquired territories in Austria, with whom Albert was unpopular. Wenceslaus was supported by Duke Otto III of Lower Bavaria, whose family were traditional enemies of the Habsburgs. Wenceslaus succeeded in bringing the Electors of Brandenburg and Saxony over to his side: Albert II of Saxony signed an elector pact on 29 November 1291 that he would vote the same as Wenceslaus; Otto IV of Brandenburg made a similar commitment.

Archbishop Siegfried believed that the Emperor should not receive the crown as an inheritance from his father, but should be freely selected by the College of Electors. He convinced the Archbishop of Mainz, Gerard II of Eppstein, to select a king who would principally serve their interests. Gerard in turn recruited the new Archbishop of Trier, Bohemund I. Thereupon, the Count Palatine was forced to submit to the majority of the College of Electors. Siegfried therefore proposed to the Elector College to select Adolf of Nassau as king. They were ready to elect him, provided he make extensive concessions to the Electors and follow their political demands.

A few days before the election, on 27 April 1292, the first of the electors, Archbishop Siegfried issued the Treaty of Andernach, stating that for Adolf to be chosen king he must promise a long list of acknowledgments of possession (including the imperial cities of Dortmund and Duisburg, and the Vogtship of Essen), pledges of imperial cities and castles, and a sum of 25,000 marks in silver. Furthermore, Adolf promised assistance against specifically listed opponents, but also the general promise that he would not admit any enemy of Siegfried II into his council. After the election, Adolf had to give the archbishop sufficient collateral for the fulfilment of the promise; otherwise he would lose his throne. The last clause is evidence of the fact that at the end of the 13th century, the coronation of the king as the constitutive moment of his rule was still very critical. Adolf promised the archbishop to ask him first for his coronation only after he had raised the agreed collateral.

The other electors extracted similar concessions from Adolf, but only after the election. Among the most far-reaching were the concessions to King Wenceslaus of Bohemia on 30 June 1292. Adolf promised Wenceslaus to remove the two duchies of Austria and Styria from Albert of Habsburg. This was to be done as the previous King Rudolf had removed these territories from King Ottokar II of Bohemia, the father of Wenceslaus. Albert would be charged to agree to this arrangement at a court hearing. If Albert would not bend, the decision of the court would be executed by force within a year. Wenceslaus would then recover the lost territories of his father. Gerhard, the Archbishop of Mainz would receive the imperial cities of Mühlhausen and Nordhausen, which corresponded with the interests of Mainz in the Thuringian region. Furthermore, Gerhard received financial benefits. Like his counterpart in Cologne, the Mainz elector also forbade the presence of his opponents in Adolf’s court. In comparison to the benefits which the electors of Mainz, Cologne, and Bohemia received, the donations to the Count Palatine and the Archbishop of Trier were modest.

On 5 May 1292 in Frankfurt am Main, the Archbishop of Mainz, in the name of all the electors, elected Adolf King of the Germans (Emperor-Elect). He was crowned in Aachen on 24 June by the Archbishop of Cologne.

== Reign ==
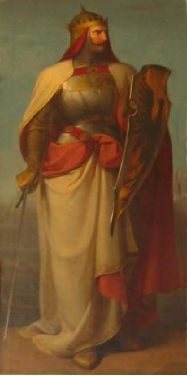
Part of the image of King Adolf in the Frankfurt Hall of Kings

At the start of his reign, Adolf had neither influence nor power, and was elected Rex Romanorum because of the electors' preference for a weak king. His power was limited from the outset because of the commitments he made.

As he had agreed with the Archbishop of Cologne, Adolf remained in his dominion for four months after his election. The archbishop awaited from the king a revision of the results of the Battle of Worringen in 1288. He had hoped to win again greater influence in the city of Cologne. Despite the tight specifications, Adolf soon emancipated himself from his Electors and concluded pacts with their opponents. Thus, for example, he confirmed the rights of the nobles and the city of Cologne, who had turned against their ruler, and even extended these rights.

Adolf also very quickly broke the promises concerning the Duchies of Austria and Styria. As a clever diplomat, Albert of Habsburg avoided a confrontation with the new king. In exchange for his surrender of the Imperial Regalia, which he still had in his possession, he received, in November 1292, a formal enfeoffment with Austria, Styria, the Windic March, and the Lordship of Pordenone. The disposition of the prestigious insignia and relics of the empire was an additional and important sign for the legitimacy of the reign of the king, but not a mandatory prerequisite. With each new document, Adolf moved a little farther away from his promises, without having to open himself up to breach of contract accusations.

Adolf acted as a self-assured ruler in other ways as well. His court was an attraction for all who sought protection from the powerful emerging territorial lords. He held numerous court days. At the beginning of his reign, he renewed the general public peace (Landfrieden) of Rudolf I for another ten years, and brought about at least two regional peaces.

Adolf used the feudal system as one of his major tools of power. He demanded from the spiritual princes a payment, called Lehnsware, for their enfeoffment with regalian rights, and increased this demand to the level of a nuisance. Many of Adolf’s contemporaries considered this action to be simony. Many of today's historians, however, view it as an innovative way to open up new state revenue sources, as other Western European kings did.

Also, the recovery and management of imperial property was important to him. He succeeded, through clever marriage policy, to bring former imperial properties back under the control of the emperor.

=== Alliance with England ===
In 1294, when Adolf’s rule was at its height, he concluded an alliance with the King Edward I of England against France and was awarded 60 000 pounds sterling, which corresponded to 90 000 gold marks. The pact had been preceded by attempts by Philip IV of France to conquer the Duchy of Burgundy and the County of Flanders. The Count of Flanders, Guy of Dampierre, mediated, therefore, the alliance between Edward I and Adolf for his protection against France. That the alliance was construed by his contemporaries as purely mercenary, and the fact that Adolf did not comply with its obligations, damaged his reputation, but this was initially without consequences.

Adolf began recruiting troops in the empire for a war against France. On 31 August 1294, he sent a declaration of war to the French king, alleging that the latter had seized rights and possessions of the empire. King Philip responded contemptuously on 9 March 1295. Pope Boniface VIII, however, ordered peace in 1295 and threatened to commence the excommunication of Adolf in the event of an outbreak of war.

=== Policies in Thuringia ===
A little later, Adolf intervened in war-torn Thuringia, where fighting had erupted between Landgrave Albert the Degenerate and his sons Frederick and Theodoric IV of Lusatia. He bought the Landgraviate from Albert in his capacity as king and probably using the payments from England. Legally, it was perfectly acceptable for Adolf to induce the feudal lord to abandon his fief and to bring the land under the empire. Furthermore, he seized the Margraviate of Meissen as an imperial fief, since it had been literally ownerless after the extinction of a collateral line of the House of Wettin and had been occupied by a son of Albert the Degenerate.

This purchase and the Margraviate of Meissen, however, affected the interests of four of the electors. The Archbishop of Mainz asserted that a part of Thuringia was not an imperial fief, but rather a fief of the Archdiocese of Mainz. Wenceslaus II of Bohemia was not thrilled by the growing power of the emperor on his northern border, especially since Adolf had promised to give him the Margraviate of Meissen. Also, all the electors hoped to profit from the turmoil in Thuringia. In addition to the ostensible return of imperial fiefs to the empire, it can not be ruled out that Adolf was anxious to build a dynastic power base (albeit a small one).

First, Adolf succeeded in securing his acquisitions diplomatically and provoking the Margrave of Brandenburg toward active support and the Archbishop of Mainz and the Duke of Saxony toward at least acquiescence of the purchase. Two bloody campaigns against the sons of Albert the Degenerate were necessary to secure the acquisitions and a peace assured the achievements. Two years later, in the summer of 1296, Adolf proudly announced on the invitation to a court day that he had by his actions significantly increased the possessions of the empire.

== Deposition ==
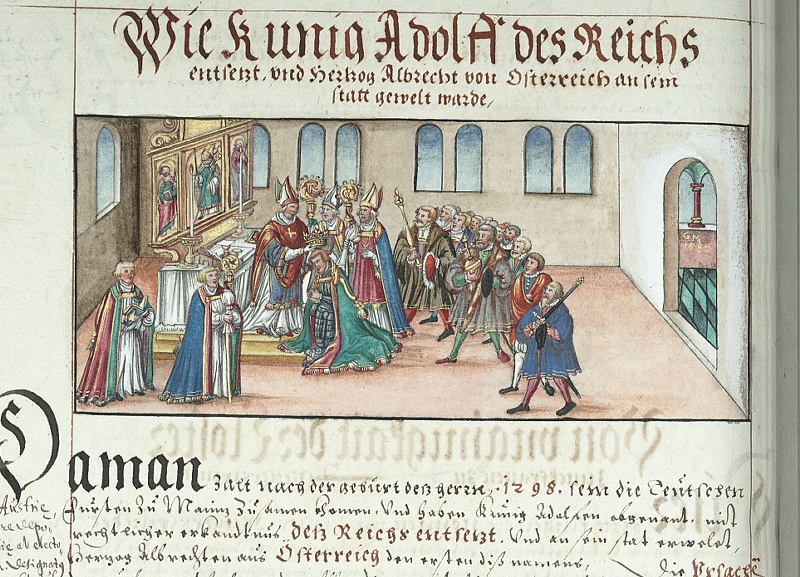
Deposition of Adolf and Election of Albert, illustration from the Chronicles of the Bishops of Würzburg

The electors probably did not plan from the beginning to depose the king, but as events unfolded this result became more inevitable. The reason for the clashes was Adolf’s Thuringia policy. On Pentecost 1297 the elector of Brandenburg, duke of Saxony, and king of Bohemia joined together to enforce their interests. The elector of Mainz, Gerhard II, was associated with this group.

In February 1298, the situation became alarming for Adolf because Wenceslaus II and Albert of Habsburg put aside their years of disputes over Austria and Styria, and reached an agreement in the event that Adolf was deposed and Albert elected in his place. There may have been a meeting of the electors as early as the coronation of King Wenceslaus of Bohemia, on 2 June 1297. In January 1298, through the efforts of the archbishop of Mainz, Albert of Habsburg was brought to testify before an imperial court in order to find a compromise between Adolf and Albert. This did not happen; the two came close to battle in the Upper Rhine Valley and the matter was not resolved.

On 1 May 1298, the archbishop of Mainz invited the king to his court, so that the dispute could be decided there. Archbishop Gerhard claimed he was authorised to do so as imperial arch-chancellor of Germany, according to an old legal principle. Adolf, as a party to the conflict, could not at the same time act as judge and saw these charges as a provocation given that Albert was raising arms against him, the rightful king. Therefore, the meeting planned for 15 June, at which the dispute was to be resolved, did not take place.

A meeting between the archbishop of Mainz, Count Albrecht of Saxony-Wittenberg, and three margraves of Brandenburg (Otto IV, Margrave of Brandenburg-Stendal, Henry I, Margrave of Brandenburg and Herman, Margrave of Brandenburg-Salzwedel) on 23 June 1298 then led to a lawsuit against the king himself. The archbishop of Cologne and the king of Bohemia had previously authorised the archbishop of Mainz to act in their names. In these proceedings Adolf was charged with numerous crimes, including the continued breach of the peace in Thuringia and the breaking of the promises he had made to the archbishop of Mainz. Adolf was deemed unworthy of his office and had forfeited his royal dignity.

It is remarkable that Adolf was not excommunicated by the Pope before being deposed. The pope was probably not even included in the deposition procedure. The princes, it is true, did try to formulate their arguments similarly to Innocent IV’s statement in the deposition of Frederick II, but the process was unprecedented. Because Adolf had been elected and crowned, the contemporary understanding was that he had been chosen by God to be the ruler and that the princes were breaking their oath in which they swore loyalty to the king. Therefore, included in the list of charges were some that, at first glance, appear peculiar today, such as the desecration of communion wafers and the simonistic extortion of money. Furthermore, there was no imperial legal procedure for the ousting of the king. Therefore, the princes relied on their right to vote, from which also they derived their right to oust a king. This argument was problematic insofar as the deposition of Frederick II was already a precedent for this case. According to church law, only the pope had the power to depose a king.

== Election of Albert and death of Adolf ==
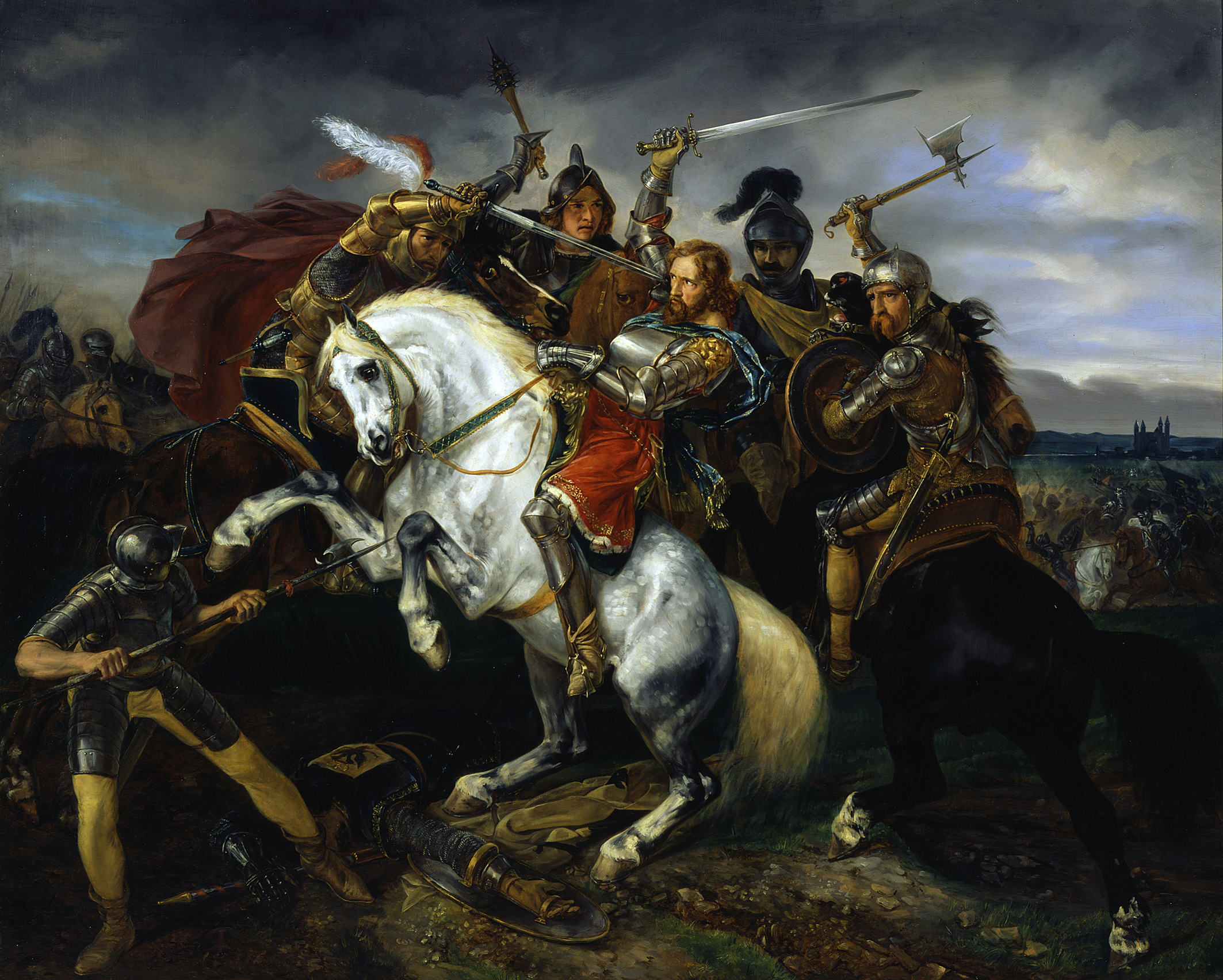
Depiction of Adolf’s death at the Battle of Göllheim, by Master Simon, Koblenz, 1829

Following Adolf’s deposition came the election of Albert I of Habsburg as the new king. How this election took place is not very clear today, as the chroniclers have little to report. The question is open, for example, whether Albert actually initially did not want to accept the choice, as he would later assert against Pope Boniface VIII.

To depose Adolf was one thing; it was another to enforce the decision against him. Adolf refused to accept this decision, but the conflict between him and the princely opposition was soon decided on the battlefield. On 2 July 1298 the armies of Adolf and Albert met at the Battle of Göllheim. The small village of Göllheim is situated in northern Rhineland-Palatinate between Kaiserslautern and Worms in present-day Donnersbergkreis. After violent attacks, Adolf fell together with his standard-bearers and a few faithful. Adolf’s army turned to flee and quickly dispersed.

Albert did not allow the followers of Adolf to bury the body of the fallen king in the Kaiserdom, the Imperial Cathedral of Speyer. Therefore, Adolf was initially buried in the Cistercian monastery of Rosenthal Abbey in present-day Kerzenheim and was only later transferred to Speyer.

== Historical legacy ==
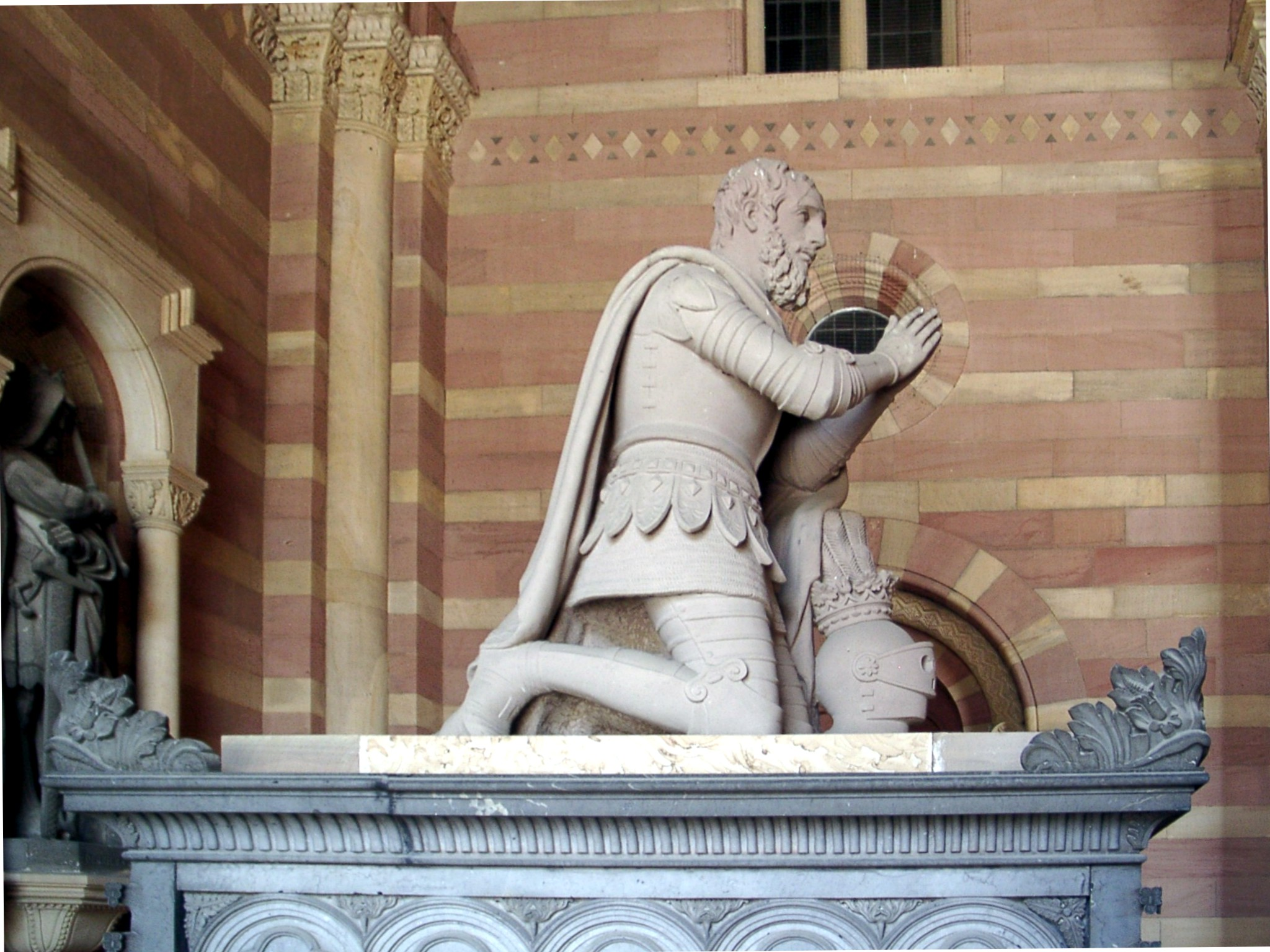
19th-century monument to Adolf from the vestibule of Speyer Cathedral

On 29 August 1309, Albert I’s successor, Emperor Henry VII transferred Adolf’s remains to the Speyer Cathedral, where he was buried next to Albert, who had been murdered in 1308. In 1824, Duke William of Nassau built a grave monument in the vestibule of the cathedral. Leo von Klenze was commissioned with the design, which shows King Adolf in armor kneeling in prayer.

Probably in the 19th century, the legend arose that Adolf was a count from the Nuremberg area. This misconception was probably based on confusion with Emich I of Nassau-Hadamar, who after his marriage to Anne of Nuremberg around 1300 was the holder of Kammerstein Castle.

In 1841 Duke Adolf of Nassau commissioned a portrait of Adolf by the Düsseldorf painter Heinrich Mücke. In 1843 this painting was hung in the Frankfurt Kaisersaal (Hall of Kings). The picture depicts King Adolf with chest armor, a white coat; and wearing an iron crown with an "implied spiked helmet”; in his right hand he holds a sword and in the left a shield with an eagle. It also bears the Latin phrase "Praestat vir sine pecunia quam pecunia sine viro" (Better a man without money than money without a man). Since no contemporary images of the King exist, the portrait is an idealized representation by the artist in the spirit of historicism. It is not based on previous portraits, since Mücke considered other representations, such as the one attributed to Georg Friedrich Christian Seekatz, to be too moderate

On 8 May 1858, Duke Adolf of Nassau established a Military and Civil Order of Merit for the Duchy. It was named for King Adoph as the most important representative of Walram line of the House of Nassau. Although the Duchy of Nassau was annexed by Prussia in 1866, Duke Adolf maintained and renewed the Order when he became Grand Duke of Luxembourg. Until today, it is a respected Order of Merit of the House of Nassau.

Thomas Carlyle calls him "a stalwart but necessitous Herr".

== Marriage and children ==
He married Imagina of Isenburg-Limburg, daughter of Gerlach IV of Isenburg-Limburg and Imagina of Blieskastel. Their children were:

1. Henry (Heinrich), died young.
2. Robert (Ruprecht) (died 2 December 1304), betrothed to Agnes of Bohemia, daughter of Wenceslaus II of Bohemia
3. Gerlach I, Count of Nassau-Wiesbaden.
4. Adolf (1292–1294).
5. Walram III van Nassau.
6. Adelheid, Abbess of Klarenthal Abbey, died 26 May 1338.
7. Imagina, died young.
8. Matilda (before 1280 – 19 June 1323, Heidelberg), married Rudolf I "the Stammerer", Duke of Upper Bavaria.

== See also ==
- German monarchs family tree

== Literature ==
- Gerlich, Alois (1994). "Adolf von Nassau (1292–1298) – Aufstieg und Sturz eines Königs, Herrscheramt und Kurfürstenfronde". Nassauische Annalen (in German). 105. Wiesbaden: 17–78.
- Even, Pierre (1998). "Das Bildnis König Adolfs von Nassau im Frankfurter Kaisersaal (The Portrait of King Adolf of Nassau in the Frankfurt Hall of Emperors)". Nassauische Annalen (in German). 109. Wiesbaden: 73–89.
- Jeep, John M. (2001). Medieval Germany: An Encyclopedia. Routledge. p. 928. ISBN 0-8240-7644-3.
- Prietzel, Malte (2004). Das Heilige Römische Reich im Spätmittelalter (The Holy Roman Empire in the Late Middle Ages) (in German). Darmstadt: Wissenschaftliche Buchgesellschaft. ISBN 3-534-15131-3.
- Reinle, Christine (2003). "Adolf von Nassau", in Bernd Schneidmüller; Stefan Weinfurter, eds. (2003). Die deutschen Herrscher des Mittelalters, Historische Porträts von Heinrich I. bis Maximilian I. (The German rulers of the Middle Ages, Historical Portraits of Henry I to Maximilian I) (in German). München: Verlag C.H. Beck. ISBN 3-406-50958-4., pp. 360–371
- Thomas, Heinz (1983). Deutsche Geschichte des Spätmittelalters (German History of the Late Middle Ages) (in German). Stuttgart., pp. 86 ff.
- Herde, Peter (2000). "From Adolf of Nassau to Lewis of Bavaria, 1292–1347". In Jones, Michael (ed.). The New Cambridge Medieval History: c. 1300–c. 1415. Vol. VI. Cambridge University Press.
- Wegele, Franz Xaver von (1875). "Adolf, Graf von Nassau". Allgemeine Deutsche Biographie (in German). 1. Leipzig: Duncker & Humblot: 89–92.
- Roest, Bert (2013). Order and Disorder: The Poor Clares between Foundation and Reform. Brill.

=== Literature from Wikimedia Commons ===
- Johann Geissel; Die Schlacht am Hasenbühl und das Königskreuz zu Göllheim (The Battle of Hasenbühl and the King's Cross of Göllheim); 1835. (in German)
- Hektor Wilhelm von Günderode; Geschichte des Römischen Königs Adolphs nach denen Urkunden und gleichzeitigen Geschichtsschreibern (History of the Roman King Adolph from his Documents and Contemporary Historians); 1779. (in German)

Adolf, King of the Romans House of Nassau Born: c 1255 Died: 1298
Regnal titles
Preceded by Rudolf I	King of the Romans (informally King of Germany); 1292–1298	Succeeded by Albert I
Preceded by Walram II	Count of Nassau; 1276–1298	Succeeded by Gerlach I & Walram III
