= Gerlach I of Nassau =

Gerlach I, Count of Nassau
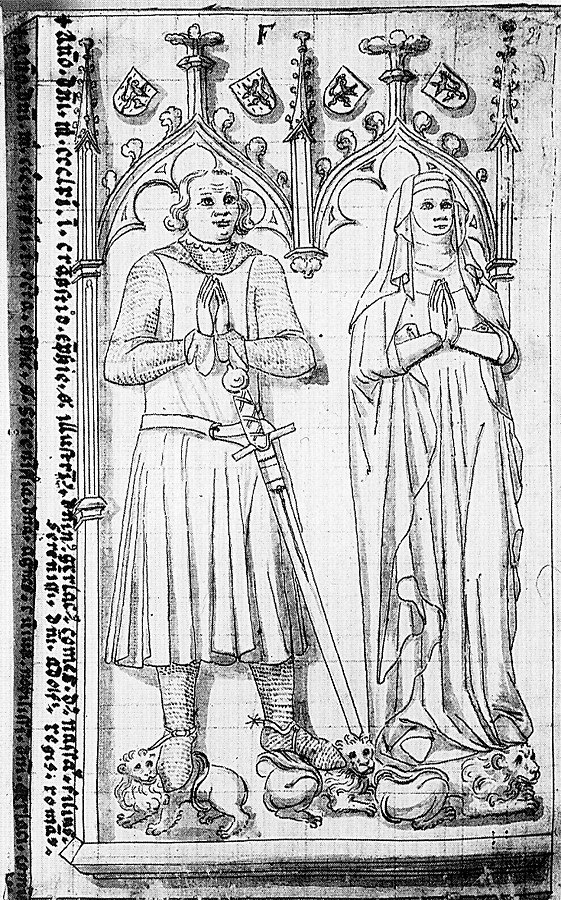

Count of Nassau (Wiesbaden, Idstein, Weilburg, and Weilnau)
- Reign: 1298–1344
- Predecessor: Adolf I
- Successor: Adolph I, Count of Nassau-Wiesbaden-Idstein; John I, Count of Nassau-Weilburg
- Regent: Rupert V of Nassau (1298 - 1304); Walram III of Nassau-Wiesbaden (1312 - 1316)
- Born: 1288
- Died: 7 January 1361 (aged 73)
- Burial: Klarenthal Abbey (destroyed in 1840)
- Spouse: Agnes (daughter of Agnes of Bavaria, Margravine of Bradenburg-Stendal); Irmgard of Hohenlohe-Weikersheim
- Issue: Adolph I, Count of Nassau-Wiesbaden-Idstein; John I, Count of Nassau-Weilburg; Gerlach von Nassau; Adelheid; Agnes; Elisabeth; Marie; Kraft of Nassau-Sonnenberg; Rupert, Count of Nassau-Sonnenberg
- House: House of Nassau
- Father: Adolf of Nassau
- Mother: Imagina of Isenburg-Limburg
- Religion: Catholic

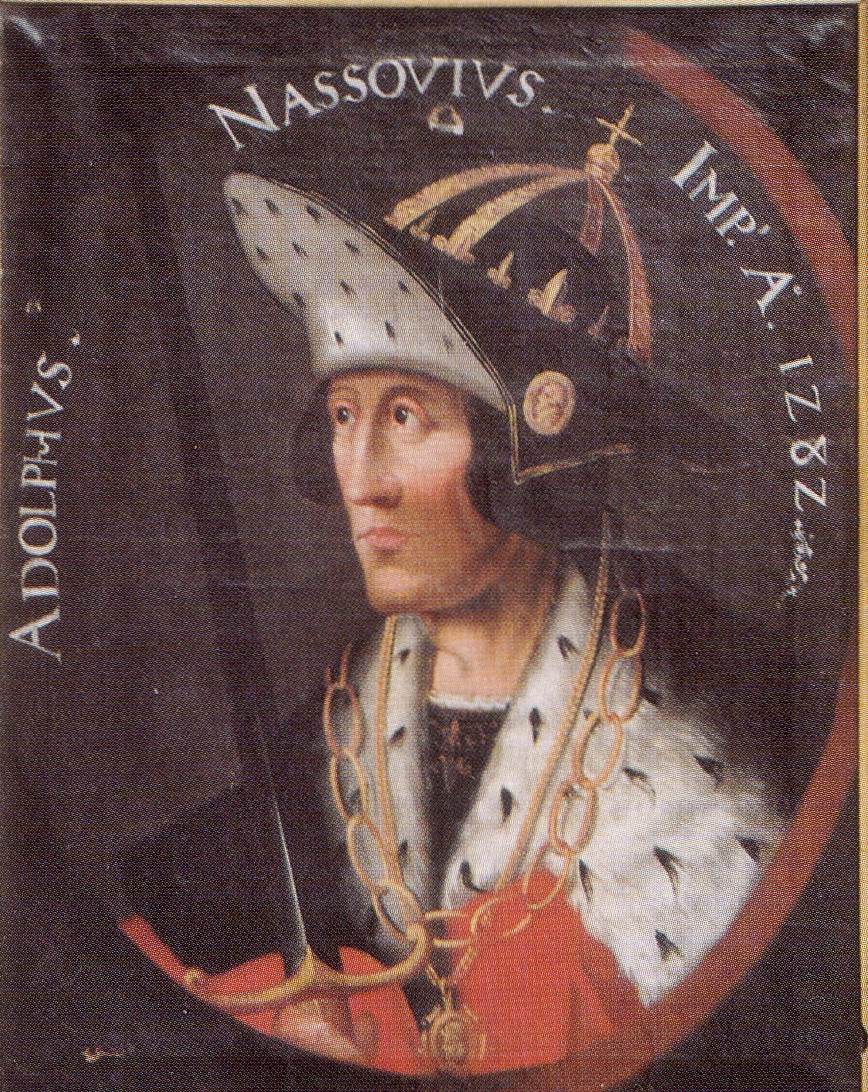
Gerlach I’s father, Adolph

Gerlach I of Nassau (1288 – 7 January 1361), Count of Nassau in Wiesbaden, Idstein, Weilburg, and Weilnau.

He was a son of Adolf of Nassau, elected King of the Romans, and Imagina of Isenburg-Limburg.

== Family and children ==
He was married two times. First, 1307 with Agnes, a daughter of Agnes of Bavaria, Margravine of Brandenburg-Stendal and her first husband Henry the Younger of Hesse, and hence a granddaughter of Landgrave Henry I "the Child" of Hesse and had the following children:

1. Adolph I, Count of Nassau-Wiesbaden-Idstein (1307 – 17 January 1370, Idstein).
2. John I, Count of Nassau-Weilburg (1309 – 20 September 1371, Weilburg).
3. Gerlach von Nassau (1322 – 12 February 1371, Aschaffenburg), Archbishop of Mainz.
4. Adelheid (d. 8 August 1344), married 1329 to Ulrich III, Lord of Hanau.
5. Agnes, a nun at Klarenthal Abbey.
6. Elisabeth (c. 1326 – c. 1370), married before 16 August 1326 to Louis of Hohenlohe.
7. Marie (d. 1366), married before 1336 to Konrad of Weinsberg.

=== Second marriage ===
Second, he married before 4 January 1337 Irmgard of Hohenlohe-Weikersheim, daughter of Kraft II of Hohenlohe-Weikersheim and had the following children:

1. Kraft of Nassau-Sonnenberg (d. 1356), fell in the Battle of Poitiers.
2. Rupert, Count of Nassau-Sonnenberg (d. 4 September 1390).

Gerlach I of Nassau House of Nassau Born: before 1288 Died: 7 January 1361
Preceded by Adolf	Count of Nassau-Wiesbaden-Idstein; 1298–1344	Succeeded by Adolph I
Preceded by Adolf	Count of Nassau-Weilburg; 1298–1344	Succeeded by John I
