= Klarenthal Abbey =

- Interactive map of Klarenthal Abbey

Monastery information
- Full name: Klarissenkloster Klarenthal
- Order: Order of Poor Ladies
- Established: 1298
- Disestablished: 1559
- Dedication: St. Clare of Assisi

People
- Founder: Count Adolf of Nassau

Site
- Location: Klarenthal, Wiesbaden, Hesse, Germany
- Coordinates: 50°05′45″N 8°11′56″E

Klarenthal Abbey (Kloster Klarenthal in German) is a former convent of the Order of Poor Ladies in the borough of Klarenthal in Wiesbaden, Germany. Klarenthal is the only abbey in present-day Wiesbaden.

== History as an active monastery ==
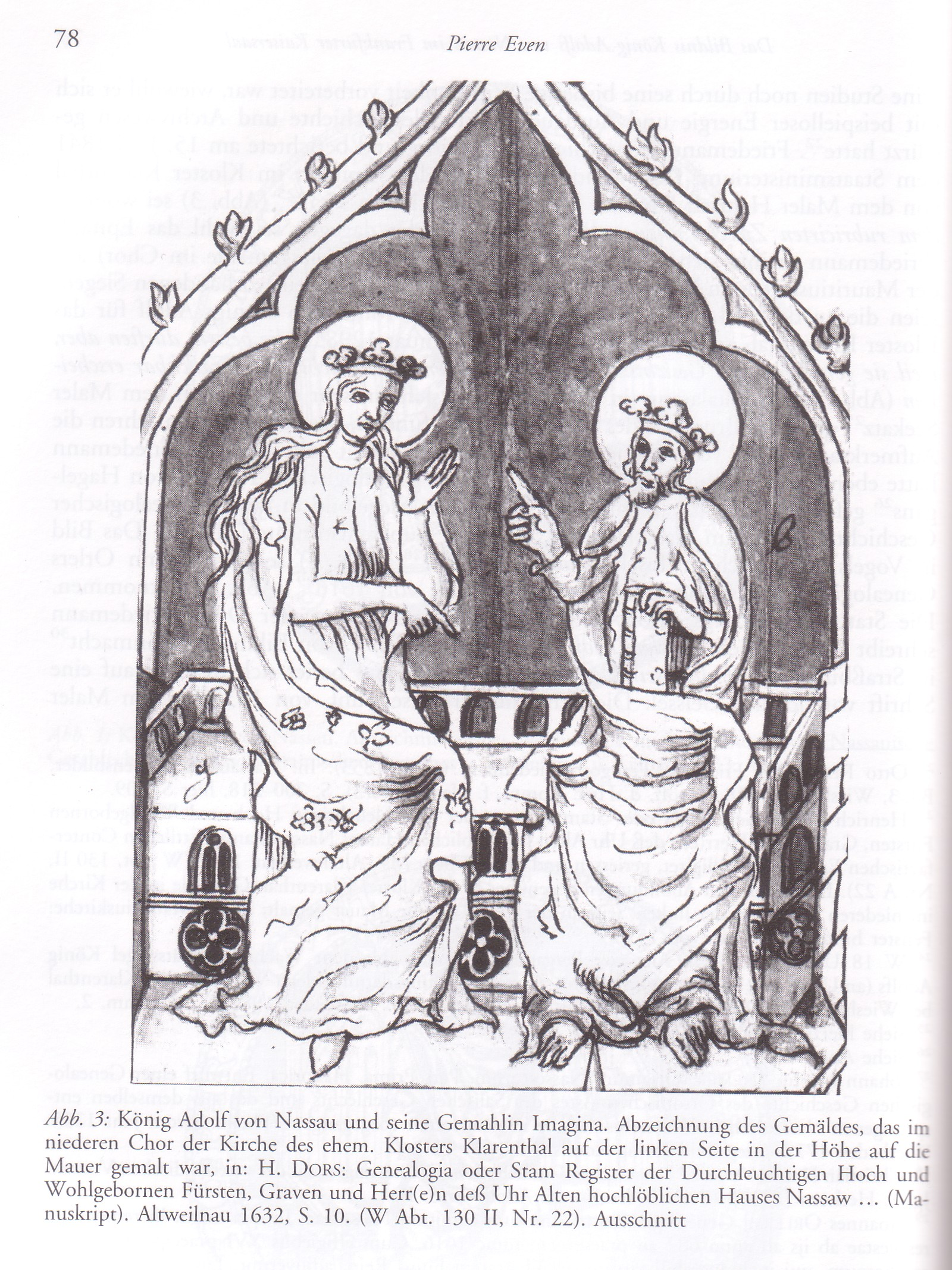
King Adolf of Nassau and his wife Imagina of Isenburg-Limburg in a mural at Klarenthal Abbey, drawing by H. Dors, 1632

Klarenthal Abbey was established in 1298 by Count Adolf of Nassau (born before 1250; died July 2, 1298), who was elected King of Germany on May 5, 1292. The monastery was to serve as a tomb for the House of Nassau, and Adolf's wife Queen Imagina of Isenburg-Limburg and many of his descendants were buried here. This continued until 1370, when, after the division of the Countship of Nassau, the preferred burial places became the central churches of the cities of residence of that particular branch of the House of Nassau. In 1429, Count Philipp I of Nassau-Weilburg-Saarbrücken was buried at Klarenthal. He was the last reigning member of the House of Nassau to be buried there.

The monastery belonged to the woman's Order of Poor Ladies, also known as the Poor Clares, which was founded on St. Clare of Assisi, from which is derived the name Klarenthal. Many noble women of the surrounding area joined the monastery, in particular from the Rheingau and Rheinhessen.

During the siege of Wiesbaden by Louis IV, Holy Roman Emperor in 1318, Klarenthal Abbey was looted and destroyed. It was rebuilt, however, in the following years. One hundred years later, under the abbesses Paze of Lindau (1412?–1422) and Countess Agnes of Hanau (1446? – 1450), the monastery reached its heyday. Economically consolidated, it could also expand and decorate the ensemble of its monastic buildings. The cloister was redesigned and the church partly painted.

The Mainz Diocesan Feud (1461–1462) presented a setback. Although the monastery was unaffected in the conflict, many of the properties from which the monastery's income was generated were destroyed. The monastery eventually recovered economically.

In the late 15th century and early 16th century, however, Klarenthal Abbey found it increasingly difficult to attract young women. The local gentry, from which most of the nuns once came, found itself falling behind the middle class economically and no longer wanted to pay the high entrance fees for admission to the monastery. Also the reputation of monasteries suffered during the late Middle Ages, so that entry into a monastery had lower social prestige. The medieval idea faded that a member of a family in a monastery performed a valuable service by praying for the deceased of her family. The Protestant Reformation, which turned its back on the monastic life, sounded its death knell in the areas where it prevailed, legitimizing the seizure of the monasteries by the local lord.

From 1553 Count Philip III, Count of Nassau-Weilburg began to take steps to dissolve the monastery. He transferred the documents and records stored there into his own possession. By no longer issuing the necessary permits, he prevented the monastery from receiving novices or choosing a new abbess. He adopted a policy of allowing its membership to decline through attrition. In 1559, the remaining five nuns accepted the Count's proposal to leave the monastery in exchange for appropriate compensation. This, however, did not legally abolish the monastery since, according to the Augsburg Interim, the Count needed the Pope's consent. Nevertheless, the monastery was secularized in 1559.

== Later use ==
Initially, the assets of Klarenthal Abbey were used to assist the poor, run by priests and teachers paid by the Countship. In 1607 the buildings were transformed into a state hospital by Count Louis II of Nassau-Weilburg. In 1632 or 1650, the epitaphs of the Counts of Nassau and their relatives interred at Klarenthal were dismantled and set up in the Mauritius Church (Wiesbaden), where they would later be destroyed in the Great Fire of 1850.

In the Thirty Years War, the buildings of Klarenthal Abbey were heavily damaged. The church was without a roof, declined to ruin, and was eventually demolished in 1756. During a time of Catholic rule during the war, the Kloster was once again used as monastery, this time of the Jesuit order. But in 1650, it was again yielded.

In 1706 it became a factory for glass. This operation existed until 1723, when a fire severely damaged the facility. From 1724, it then became a paper mill. This lasted until 1840 when another fire damaged the building and this use ended. In 1730, the small settlement, which had formed around the factory, erected a chapel, which was overseen by a pastor from Wiesbaden.

== Remains ==
Of the original monastery buildings, little remains visible after to the repeated destruction. The present buildings partially use the foundations of the monastery buildings and in some places the walls preserve medieval stonework, including some of the arcades of the cloister. Also, spolia can be seen in various places. Anything else remaining of the original monastery is invisible to all but archaeologists. On the fields formerly belonging to Klarenthal Abbey, the housing development of Klarenthal was built in 1966, taking its name from the former monastery.

== Abbesses ==
Abbottess	Term	Notes
Countess Richardis of Nassau	until 1311
Countess Adelheid of Nassau	1311–1338
Imagina I.	1338? - 1347
Katherina	1348–1350?
Jutta I. of Laurenburg	1350? – 1353?
Countess Agnes of Nassau	1353–1356
Imagina II.	1356? – after 1360
Countess Gele of Nassau	in the 1360s
Jutta II. of Laurenburg	1360s / 1370s
Countess Margarethe of Nassau	1370s /1380s	16 years in total
Paze of Hofheim	1380s – 1390s	6 years total
Cecilia	1390s – 1400s (decade)	of the Mainz Patriziat
Paze of Lindau	1412? - 1422
Countess Agnes of Hanau	1422–1446	Her sister Adelheid of Hanau was also a nun in Klarenthal
Margarethe of Eppstein (Adelsgeschlecht)	1446–1450
Sophie of Bernbach	1450–1453
Countess Bertha of Nassau	1453–1457
Margarethe of Scharfenstein	1457–1466
Countess of Wild und Rhein Katharina von Dhaun-Kyrburg	1466–1473	Daughter of Johann IV, Count of Wild und Rhein und the Countess Elisabeth of Hanau (died 1446)
Countess Margarethe of Nassau	1473–1486
Sophie von Hunolstein	1486–1508
Schenkin Magdalena von Erbach	1508–1512
Margarete von Dern	1512–1518
Countess Maria von Hanau-Lichtenberg	1518–1525
Anna Brendel	1525–1553	of Homburg

== Other burials ==
- Richardis (died July 28, 1311), a nun in Klarenthal Abbey and Mainz, daughter of Walram II, Count of Nassau
- Gerlach I, Count of Nassau
- Agnes of Hesse, his wife
- Mechtild of Nassau
- Philipp I, Count of Nassau-Weilburg
- Imagina of Isenburg-Limburg
