= Battle of Göllheim =

13th-century battle fought over German kingship

- Part of the fight for the rule over the Holy Roman Empire
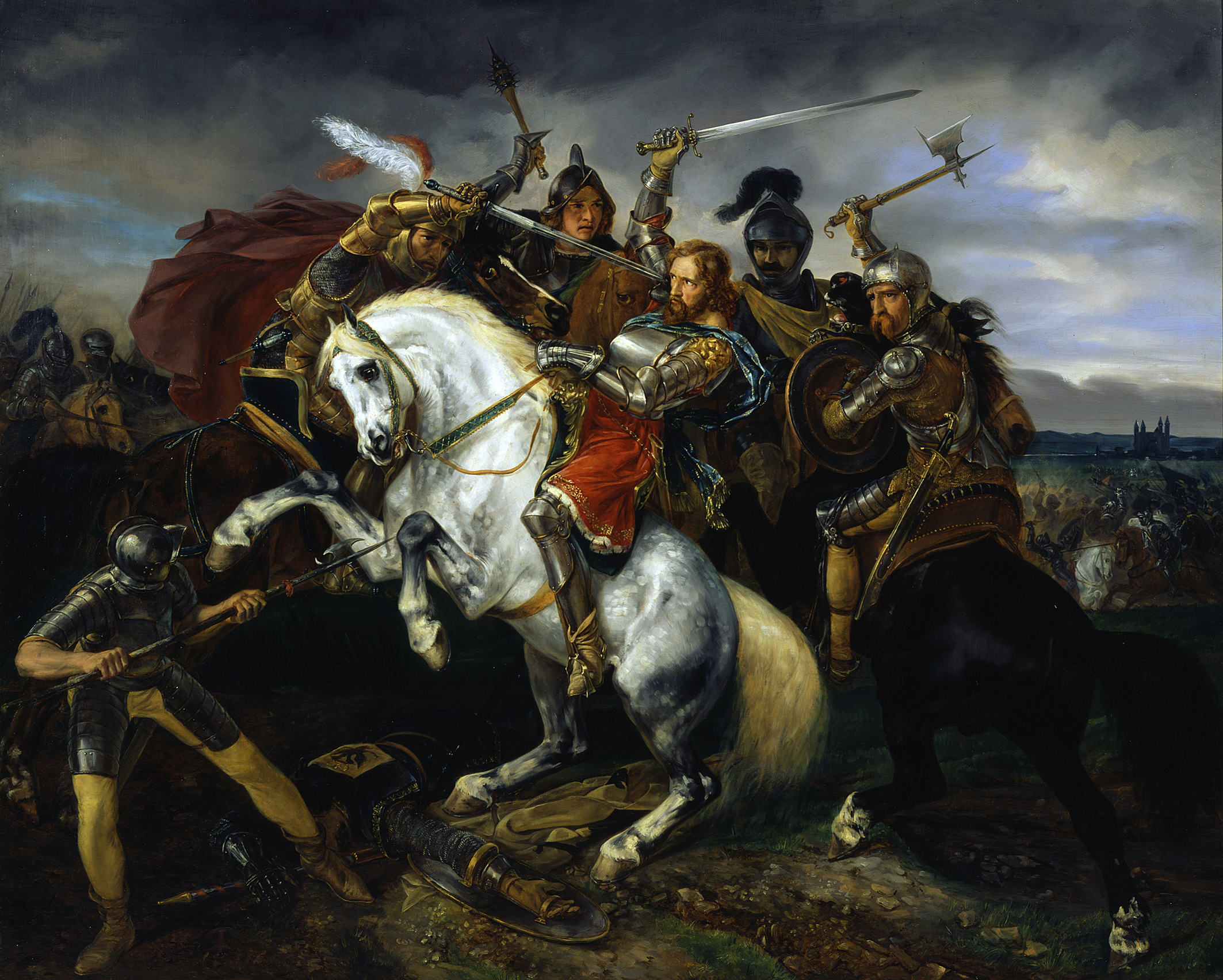
- Death of Adolf of Nassau, Simon Meister, 1829
Date	2 July 1298
Location	Göllheim near Worms 49°35′33″N 8°02′39″E
Result	Habsburg victory

Belligerents
Duchy of Austria; Kingdom of Bohemia; Kingdom of Hungary	County of Nassau; Electoral Palatinate

Commanders and leaders
Albert I of Habsburg	Adolf of Nassau †
- Location within Germany

The Battle of Göllheim was fought on 2 July 1298 between the forces of duke Albert I of Habsburg (German: Albrecht) and king Adolf of Nassau following the unilateral decision of the prince electors, without any formal election, to dethrone Adolf and proclaim Albert as king. Adolf died in the battle.

== Background ==
After the death of Rudolph I at Germersheim on 15 July 1291, his son Albert I was the most obvious successor to the throne of the Holy Roman Empire. However, Albert's undignified looks (he was known as "Albert the One-Eyed", due to an open eye socket from a battle injury) as well as his poor attitude gave the prince electors an excuse not to elect him. The electors did not want a strong king, and Albert, as the son of former king Rudolph I, controlled one of the strongest domestic power bases in the empire, while Adolf was simply a somewhat insignificant Count from the House of Nassau.

Accordingly, at the next Imperial Diet near Frankfurt, Adolf of Nassau (a cousin of one of the electors) was elected, though only after making a number of concessions to the Electors. Although Albert publicly recognized Adolf's election with good grace, he was driven by irreconcilable anger and plotted against him. Further, once king, Adolf of Nassau-Weilburg was determined to forge his own power base and failed to commit to the concessions he had made to get elected. He attempted to seize Thuringia and Meissen from the Wettins.

As he was regarded as having repeatedly abused his royal prerogatives, the Electors deposed Adolf without any formal electoral process. As a result, Adolf chose to defend his rights as king, and went on campaign against the Habsburgs.

Before this, and following a request of the Elector Archbishop of Mainz, Albert had already begun to move to the Rhine and engage Adolf, who had his own strong army. Albert evaded Adolf's army, which was trying to stop him marching west, near Ulm and again near Breisach. Albert then advanced north through the Upper Rhine valley towards Mainz. Albert's army included contingents from the Habsburg territories, Hungary, Switzerland and those of Henry II, Prince-Bishop of Constance. They met outside the fortified city of Alzey and invested the castle. On arrival, Albert received the news of Adolf's deposition on 23 June 1298.

In response to the appeal to support Albert of Habsburg, King Andrew III of Hungary (married with Habsburg Agnes in 1296) dispatched a force of 200–300 cavalrymen under the command of Master Demeter, ispán of Zólyom and Pozsony. The contingent consisted primarily of castle warriors from counties of Pozsony, Zólyom, Liptó, and the mining districts.

Adolf approached from the imperial city of Worms, in order to relieve Alzey Castle. His forces consisted of contingents from the Taunus, Adolf's home region, the Electoral Palatinate, Franconia, Lower Bavaria, Alsace and St. Gallen.

== Battle ==
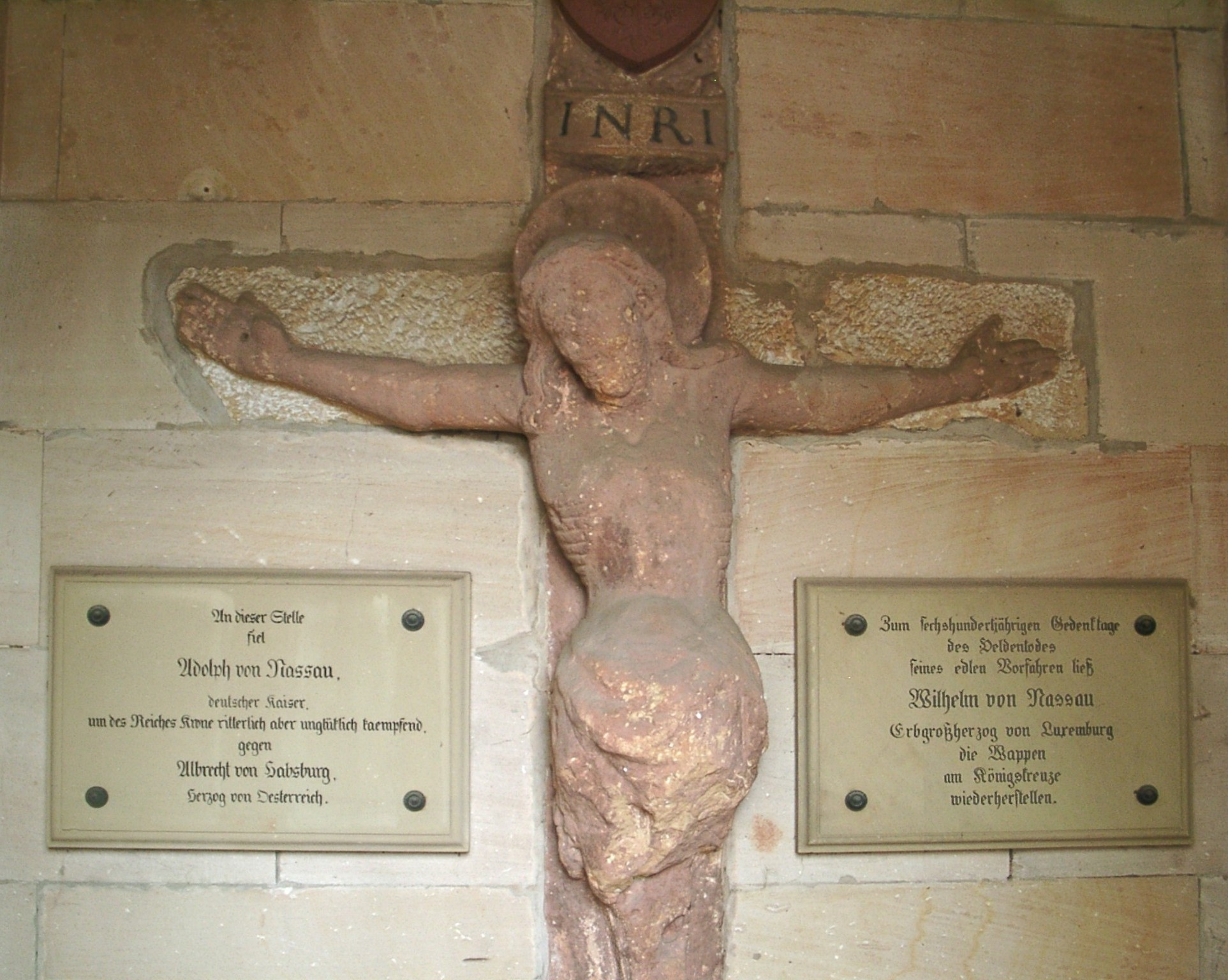
The King's Cross at the battlefield

Albert initially avoided a collision, but then on July 2, 1298 deployed his troops in a strategically favorable position on the Hasenbühl, a hill near Göllheim. Göllheim community is located 20 km (12 mi) south of Alzey between Kaiserslautern and Worms, near the Donnersberg massif.

Johannes von Geissel describes the exact course of the battle in his 1835 monograph The Battle of Hasenbühl and the King's Cross at Göllheim. The battle was fought in three engagements and lasted from the morning until the early afternoon. The battle remained undecided for many hours and, even after Adolf's death, it did not end immediately. The third engagement proved to be decisive. Adolf, who is said to have rushed to attack, was possibly slain by a Raugrave named Georg. Thereupon a large part of Adolf's army dissolved and fled, others continued to fight until they learnt about Adolf's death. According to Geissel's monograph, 3,000 battle horses perished on the losing side, while the winners fared not much better.

The result of the battle was generally considered as a judgment of God. Nevertheless, Albert insisted on a formal election by the electors, which took place in Frankfurt on July 27, 1298. As the kingship returned to the Habsburgs, the conflicts of interest between the electors and the king continued.

Adolf's widow, Imagina of Isenburg-Limburg, saw her husband's coffin transferred from Rosenthal Abbey to Speyer Cathedral by emperor Henry VII in 1309. There he was buried alongside his rival Albert, who had been murdered in 1308 by his own nephew Johann. Imagina had a memorial cross erected on the battlefield near Göllheim, which was designed in the early Gothic style. In the 19th century a chapel was built around it, and it has been preserved to this day.
