= European microstates =

Small sovereign states in Europe

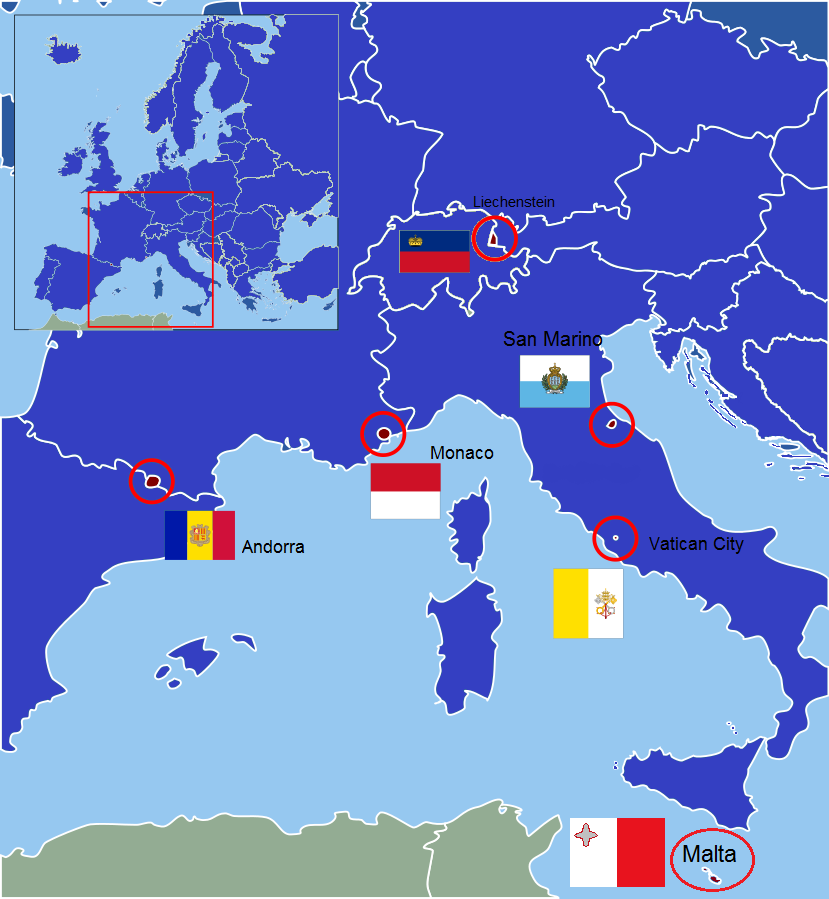
Map of the European microstates

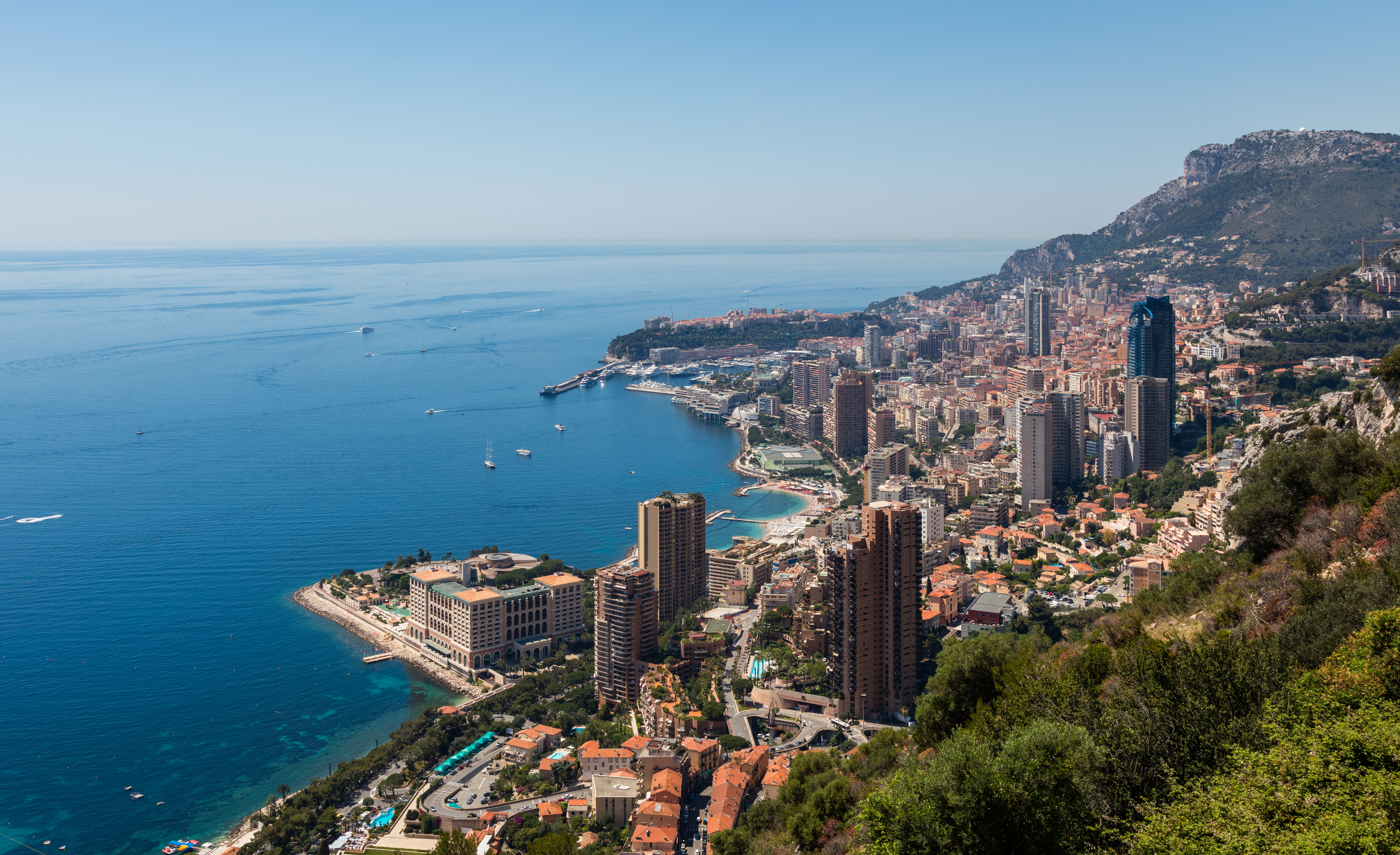
Monaco is governed by the Minister of State, usually a French citizen proposed by the French government to the Prince of Monaco.

A European microstate or European ministate is a very small sovereign state in Europe. In modern usage, it typically refers to the six smallest states in Europe by area: Andorra, Liechtenstein, Malta, Monaco, San Marino, and Vatican City. Andorra, Liechtenstein, Monaco and Vatican City are monarchies (Vatican City is an elective monarchy ruled by the Pope). These states trace their status back to the first millennium or the early second millennium except for Liechtenstein, created in the 18th century.

Microstates are small independent states recognised by larger states. According to the qualitative definition suggested by Zbigniew Dumieński (2014), microstates can also be viewed as "modern protected states, i.e. sovereign states that have been able to unilaterally depute certain attributes of sovereignty to larger powers in exchange for benign protection of their political and economic viability against their geographic or demographic constraints."

In line with this definition, only Andorra, Liechtenstein, Monaco, Vatican City and San Marino qualify as "microstates" as only these states are sovereignties functioning in close, but voluntary, association with their respective larger neighbours. Luxembourg, which is far larger than all these microstates combined, nonetheless shares some of these characteristics. Jersey, Guernsey and the Isle of Man are sometimes classed as "microstates", but are not fully sovereign as they are crown dependencies of the United Kingdom and do not represent themselves in international bodies such as the UN. Kosovo, Cyprus and Montenegro are small in size, but are generally not classed as microstates, due to their larger size and population. Transnistria, Northern Cyprus, South Ossetia and Abkhazia by some definitions can be considered microstates; however, they lack recognition from the international community, but are considered de facto independent states.

== List of states often labelled microstates ==
These may or may not be considered microstates.

Arms	Flag	Name	Capital city	Area	Population	Notes
Andorra	(Andorra)	Andorra	Andorra la Vella	468 km^{2} (181 sq mi)	85,863	The Principality of Andorra used to be a feudal remnant high in the Pyrenees, a fiefdom held jointly by the Bishop of Urgell in Spain and the Count of Foix in France, with a population of approximately 89,000. The County of Foix merged into the French Crown in 1607 and thus the King of France and then the President of France took the place of the Count of Foix. Since 1993 Andorra has been a parliamentary democracy, but it maintains two Co-Princes, one being France's elected head of state and the other being the Bishop of Urgell. It has been independent since 1278. Catalan is its sole official language.
Liechtenstein	(Liechtenstein)	Liechtenstein	Vaduz	160 km^{2} (62 sq mi)	41,232	The Principality of Liechtenstein is the sole remaining polity of the Holy Roman Empire, having been created out of the counties of Vaduz and Schellenberg in 1719 as a sovereign fief for the wealthy Austrian House of Liechtenstein. Its population is over 35,000. Owing to its geographic position between Switzerland and Austria, it was not swallowed up during the reorganisation of Germany following the French Revolution, and avoided incorporation into the German Empire later in the 19^{th} century.
Malta	(Malta)	Malta	Valletta	316 km^{2} (122 sq mi)	519,562	The Republic of Malta is an archipelago of seven islands in the central Mediterranean Sea, with a population of around 574,250 (2025 estimate), larger than the population of several non-microstates, notably Iceland, which has a population of around 389,444 (2025 estimate). People first settled the islands around 5200 BC, arriving from the nearby island of Sicily. Malta gained independence from the United Kingdom as a Commonwealth realm in 1964 and became a republic in 1974. It is a member of the Commonwealth of Nations and the only microstate to hold full membership in the European Union. Roman Catholicism is the official state religion.
Monaco	(Monaco)	Monaco	None (city-state)	2.02 km^{2} (0.78 sq mi)	38,367	The Principality of Monaco on the French Riviera, ruled by the House of Grimaldi since the 13^{th} century, achieved full independence only following the cession of the surrounding Nice region from Piedmont to France in 1860. Monaco is located on the Mediterranean Sea, tucked into the Maritime Alps and has a population of around 35,000. Its constitutional monarchy is led by Prince Albert II. The population is 95% Roman Catholic. French, English, Italian, and Monégasque are the most widely spoken languages. Its economy is based on: light manufacturing, banking and financial services, shipping and trade, R&D in biotechnology, marine environments and tourism.
San Marino	(San Marino)	San Marino	Città di San Marino	61 km^{2} (24 sq mi)	35,436	The Republic of San Marino, also known as the Most Serene Republic of San Marino, is the oldest surviving sovereign constitutional republic in the world. It is the continuation of a monastic community founded in 301 A.D. and is the last survivor of a large number of self-governing Italian communes from the Middle Ages, having survived the consolidation of Italy into medium-sized territorial states in the 15^{th} century and the unification of Italy in the 19^{th} century, largely owing to its remote location in a valley of the Apennine Mountains and its decision to offer sanctuary to leaders of the unification movement. It has a population of approximately 30,000.
Vatican City	(Vatican City)	Vatican City	None (city-state)	0.49 km^{2} (0.19 sq mi)	882	A sovereign Vatican state was established by the Lateran Treaty of 1929 between the Pope and the government of Benito Mussolini, in which the Pope recognised the Italian state in exchange for establishing Roman Catholicism as the state religion, and recognition of the Pope's sovereignty over a tiny state entirely surrounded by the city of Rome. Its population is about 800, of whom about 450 reside in its territory. The Holy See is a unique sovereign entity under international law distinct from Vatican City with the pope as the head of both, maintaining diplomatic and official relations with over 170 states and entities and participating in various international organisations either in its own capacity or on behalf of Vatican City.

== Inter-relations and networks ==
Since 1985 the states have been conducting the Games of the Small States of Europe sporting events.

The parliaments of these states have been conducting the Conference of Speakers of Parliaments of the Small States of Europe since 2006, with further cooperation having come out of it.

The WHO has advanced health related cooperation through its small countries initiative since 2013.

Cooperation, especially with the European Union, has been pursued regarding taxation, since the states have been used as tax havens. Liechtenstein and Monaco signed a taxation treaty in 2017.

== Economic policies and relationship with the European Union ==
The European microstates are all of limited size and population. They also have limited natural resources. As a result, they often have adopted special economic policies, typically involving low levels of taxation and few restrictions on external financial investment. Malta is a full member of the European Union, while the other five European microstates have obtained special relations with the European Union and San Marino, Andorra and Monaco are part of the EU customs union while Liechtenstein is in a customs union with Switzerland.

== Similar entities and definitions ==
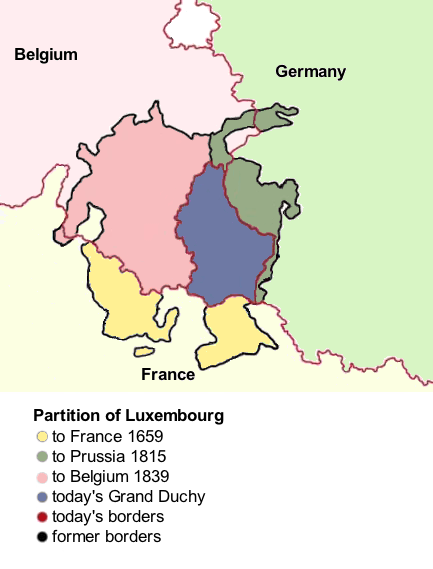
Luxembourg territorial changes over the centuries

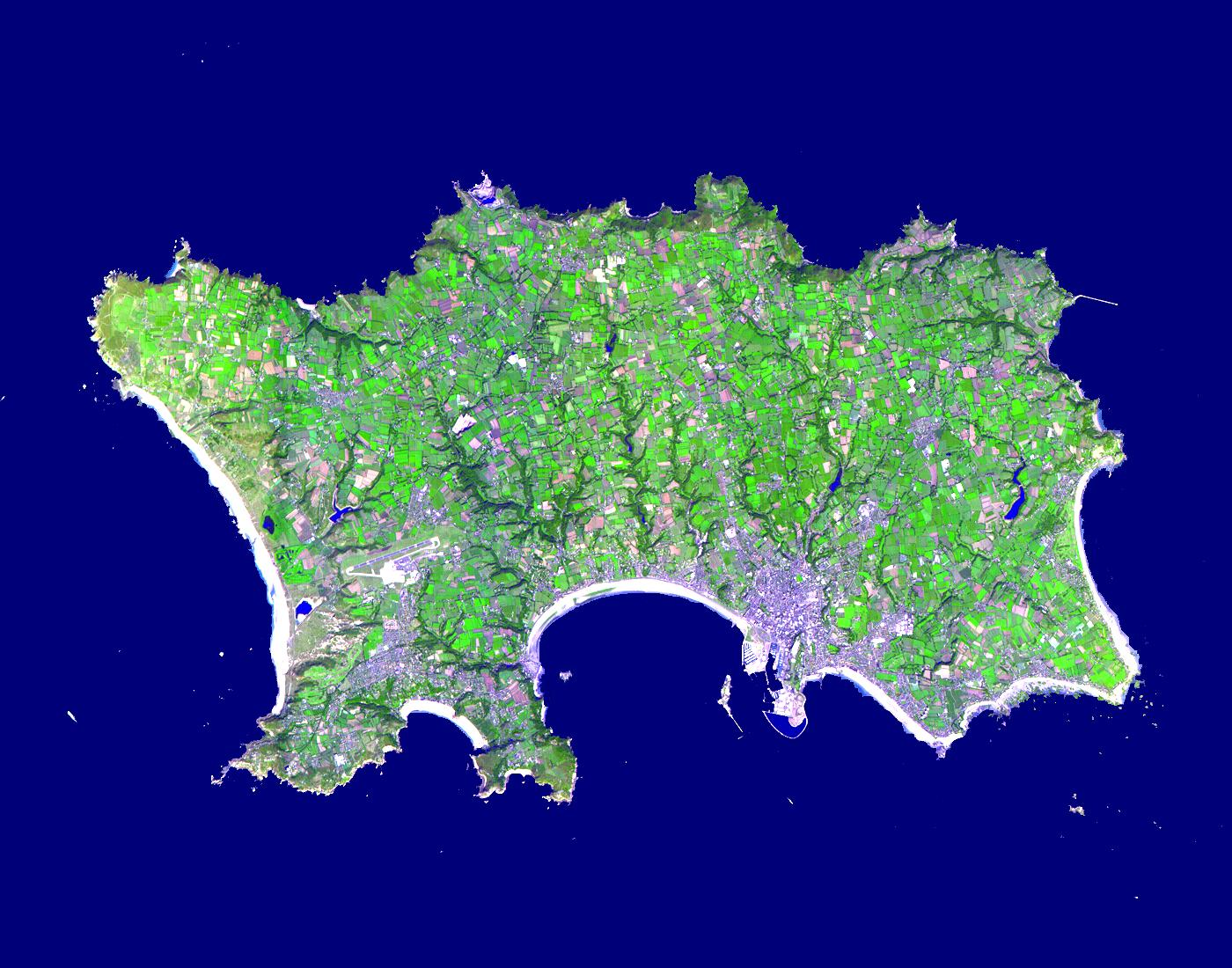
Jersey, a crown dependency of the United Kingdom. Although not part of the United Kingdom, it is a possession of the British crown.

What countries are microstates is not clearly defined. However, some institutions use specific definitions. Two institutions, the World Bank and the IMF, define them as states with a population of no more than 200,000. However, others have focused on area, not population. The larger microstates are less likely to be considered such, and while Malta may sometimes be considered one, it is not common to describe Iceland, Kosovo, Montenegro, or Luxembourg as microstates. These are more likely to be deemed a small state, which has been defined as a state of fewer than 1.5 million people, though some go as high as several million if the state has limited land area.

The World Bank uses a threshold of 1.5 million people to describe a small state, and less than 200,000 for microstates. Some researchers have suggested that a microstate has up to one million in population, and one as 1.5 million, but that is also used as threshold for small states, not microstates. The World Bank settled on 200 thousand for a microstate, as did the IMF. A microstate has also been defined as less than the 100 thousand population.

A Czech study on microstates in the year 2000 defined three sizes of microstate and one subtype. The Czech definition focuses on land area, but also noted population:

1. small microstates (0–100 km^{2}),
2. medium microstates (100–500 km^{2}),
3. large microstates (500–1,000 km^{2}),

with a fourth category for large microstate with a large population.

A paper in 2020 discussed the history of the smallest European states, and compared Malta and Cyprus to Andorra, Liechtenstein, Monaco, and San Marino.

The Crown dependencies are the Isle of Man, Jersey and Guernsey, are small territories that have a high degree of autonomy and are not part of the United Kingdom. The Crown dependencies have a small territory and population, with the Isle of Man being the largest out of the three having a size of 572 km^{2} and the smallest being Guernsey, with a size of 78 km^{2} and a population of 67,334. However, due to being not fully sovereign as the United Kingdom is responsible for their defence, international relations (including treaties) and citizenship and are also possessions of the British crown and also including their status as islands, they are sometimes excluded from being microstates.

Including both traditional microstates and small states in the European region yields several more examples, such as: Cyprus, Kosovo, Luxembourg and Montenegro.

- Andorra
- Cyprus (Note: Geographically a part of Asia, considered a European country in political geography. The United Nations geoscheme includes Cyprus in Western Asia.)
- Liechtenstein
- Luxembourg
- Malta
- Monaco
- Montenegro
- San Marino
- Kosovo

Some states with limited recognition in Europe can sometimes be considered microstates, although they are larger than traditional microstates. Notable examples include:

- South Ossetia-Alania
- Abkhazia
- Northern Cyprus
- Transnistria

=== Dependencies and autonomous areas ===
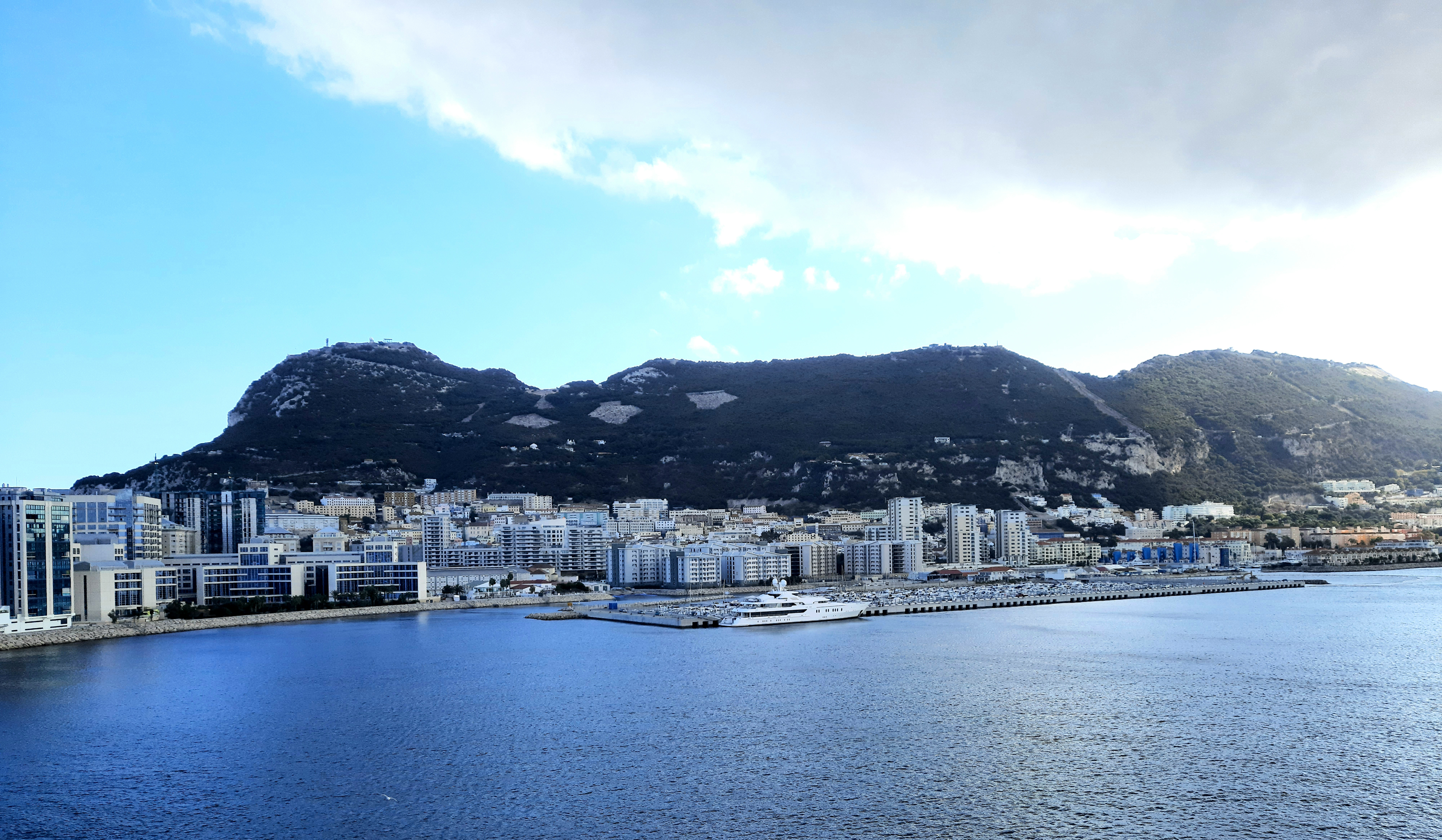
Gibraltar

While the microstates have sovereignty over their own territory, there are also a number of small autonomous territories, which, despite having (in almost all cases) their own independent government, executive branch, legislature, judiciary, police, and other trappings of independence, are nonetheless under the sovereignty of another state.

- Akrotiri and Dhekelia (British overseas territory)
- Adjara (autonomous region of Georgia)
- Appenzell Innerrhoden (Swiss canton)
- Appenzell Ausserrhoden (Swiss canton)
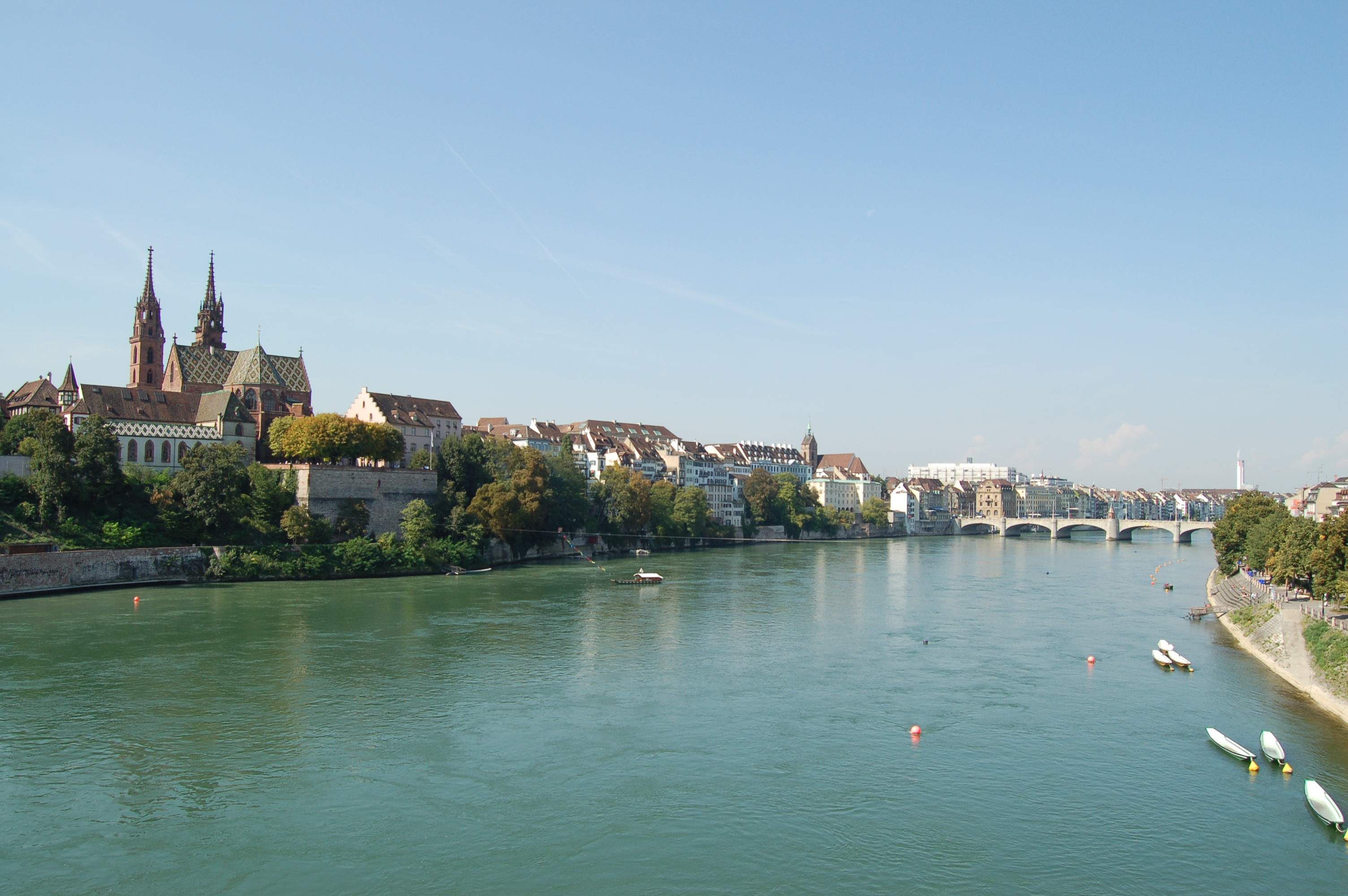
  Basel, Switzerland
- Aran (Autonomous area of Catalonia, Spain)
- Åland (autonomous county of Finland)
- Basel-city (Swiss canton)
- Brussels (federal Region of Belgium)
- Berlin (city-state and capital of Germany)
- Bremen (city-state of Germany)
- Faroe Islands (self-governing territory of the Kingdom of Denmark)
- Geneva (Swiss Republic and canton)
- Gibraltar (British overseas territory)
- Glarus (Swiss canton)
- Neuchâtel (Swiss canton)
- Obwalden (Swiss canton)
- Mount Athos (autonomous monastic community in Greece)
- Hamburg (city-state of Germany)
- Gagauzia (Autonomous region of Moldova)
- Schaffhausen (Swiss canton)
- Solothurn (Swiss canton)
- Sovereign Military Hospitaller Order of Saint John of Jerusalem, of Rhodes and of Malta (sovereign entity under International law and has diplomatic relations; however, has no territory, with its headquarters, the Magistral Palace in Rome, Italy, having special autonomous privileges)
- Vienna (city-state and capital of Austria)
- Zug, (Swiss canton)

=== Sovereign Military Order of Malta ===
Flag of the Sovereign Military Order of Malta

The Sovereign Military Order of Malta is a Catholic lay order that is a sovereign entity under international law rather than a state.

Unlike the Holy See, which is sovereign over the Vatican City, the Order has no territory. However, its headquarters, located in Palazzo Malta and Villa Malta, are granted extraterritoriality by Italy, and the same status is recognised by Malta regarding its historical headquarters, located in Fort St Angelo. The Order is the direct successor to the medieval Knights Hospitaller, also known as the Knights of Malta, and today operates as a largely charitable and ceremonial organisation.

It has permanent non-state observer status at the United Nations, has full diplomatic relations, including embassies, with 115 states, and is in more informal relationships with five others. It issues its own stamps, coins, passports, and license plates, and has its own army medical corps.

== Historical small territories ==
The wars of the French Revolution and the Napoleonic Wars caused the European map to be redrawn several times. A number of short-lived client republics were created, and the fall of the Holy Roman Empire gave sovereignty to each of its many surviving Kleinstaaten. The situation was not stabilised until after the Congress of Vienna in 1815. Following World War I and World War II a number of territories gained temporary status as international zones, protectorates or occupied territories. A few of them are mentioned here:

Historical small territories
Name	Start date	End date	Modern-day state(s)	Notes
Couto Misto	10^{th} century	1868	Spain/Portugal	Independent microstate on the border between Spain and Portugal
Duchy of Naples	840	1137	Italy	The Duchy survived the withdrawal of the Byzantine Empire and remained independent, until subsumed by the Kingdom of Sicily in 1137.
Republic of Lucca	1160	1805	Italy	The Republic was absorbed into the Principality of Lucca and Piombino (a client state of the First French Empire) between 1805 and 1815, and formed the independent Duchy of Lucca between 1815 and 1847, as a consequence of the Congress of Vienna.
County of Santa Fiora	1274	1633	Italy	
Senarica	1343	1797	Italy	Smallest independent state to hold that distinction for so long
Gersau	1433	1798	Switzerland	
Republic of Mulhouse	1347	1798	France	
Republic of Ragusa	1358	1808	Dubrovnik, Croatia	
Republic of Cospaia	1440	1826	Italy	Created after an error by Pope Eugene IV, during the sale of territory to the Republic of Florence. A small strip of land went unmentioned in the sale treaty and its inhabitants promptly declared themselves independent.
Republic of Saint-Malo	1590	1594	Ille-et-Vilaine, France	
Republic of Paulava	1769	1795	Lithuania	A completely independent republic founded by a Lithuanian noble Paweł Ksawery Brzostowski, with its own president, parliament, laws and army. The state was recognised by the grand duke and king Stanisław August Poniatowski.
Gozo	1798	1800	Gozo, Malta	
Free City of Kraków	1815	1846	Kraków, Poland	
Neutral Moresnet	1816	1920	Kelmis, Belgium	Neutral Moresnet was a condominium between the Netherlands and Prussia over a disputed zinc mine.
Free Cities of Menton and Roquebrune	1848	1849	France	The Free Cities of Menton and Roquebrune seceded from Monaco in 1848. In November 1849, they were annexed by Sardinia, and in 1861 were annexed by France.
Republic of Kruševo	3 August 1903	13 August 1903	Municipality of Kruševo, North Macedonia	
Free State of Schwenten	6 January 1919	10 August 1919	Świętno, Poland	
Independent Medvyn Republic	1919	1921	Medvyn, Ukraine	
Free State of Bottleneck	10 January 1919	23 February 1923	Hesse, Germany	
Free City of Danzig	1920	1939	Gdańsk, Poland	
Klaipeda Region	1920	1923	Lithuania	The territory was placed under French control under the Treaty of Versailles in 1920, but was occupied by Lithuania in 1923, in the Klaipėda Revolt.
Free State of Fiume	1920	1924	Rijeka, Croatia	
Territory of the Saar Basin	1920	1935	Saarland, Germany	Following World War I, the Saar was a League of Nations mandate under French control, until a referendum in 1935 saw over 90% of voters opt to return to Germany.
Saar Protectorate	1945	1956	Saarland, Germany	Following World War II, France governed the Saar directly as a protectorate, surrounded by France proper to the west and the French Zone of Occupation of Germany to the east.
Free Territory of Trieste	1947	1954	Divided between Italy, Slovenia and Croatia	Trieste had been occupied by Italy following the end of World War I, and was notionally recreated as a Free Territory following the end of World War II, when it was divided between areas of Allied and Yugoslav control, formalised in 1954 with the Allied part being returned to Italy.

=== Historical dependencies ===
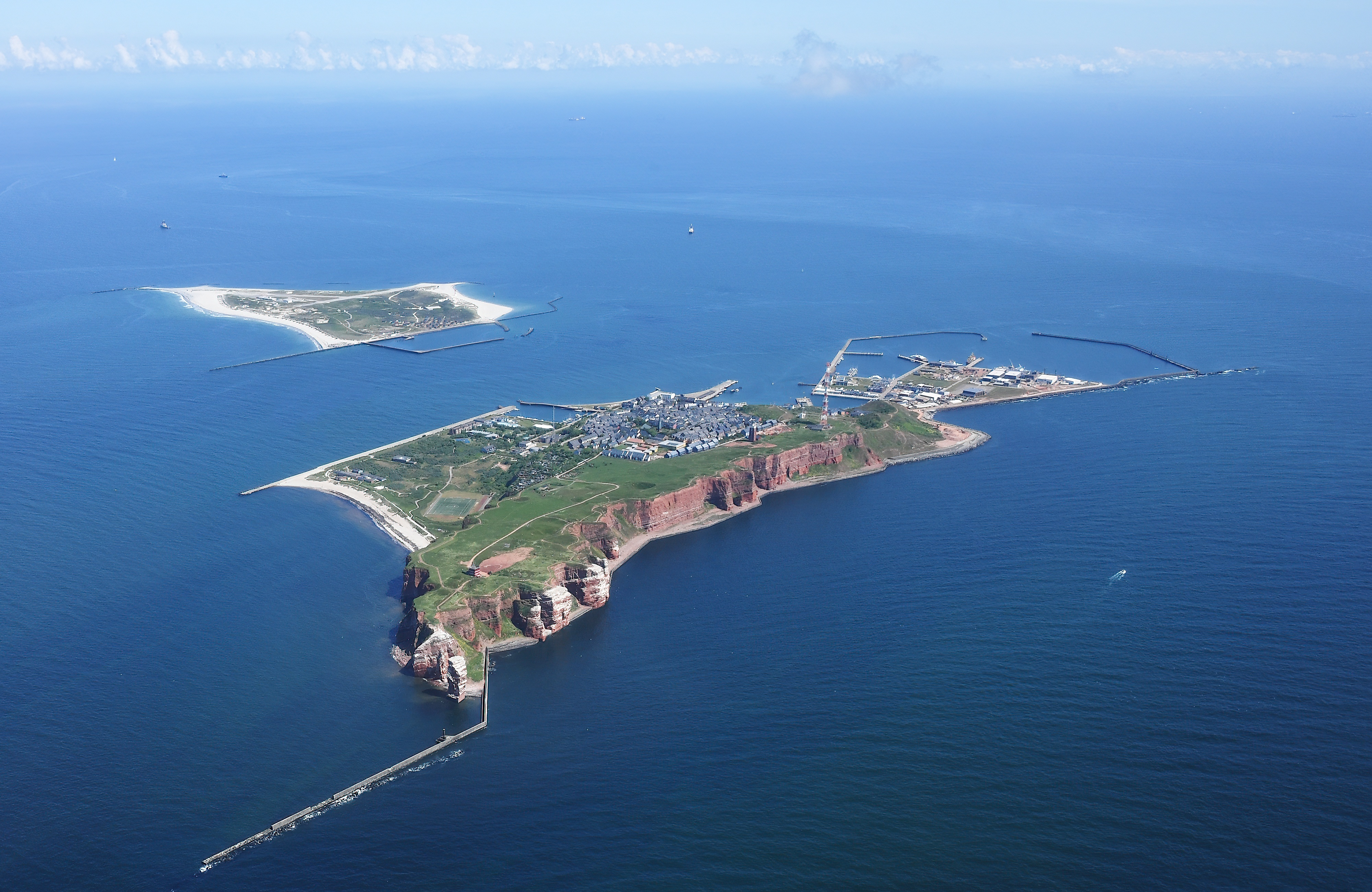
Heligoland

Several historical territorial dependencies and colonies have also formerly existed in Europe, under the sovereignty of another state or monarch. These include:

- Heligoland (colony of the United Kingdom from 1807 to 1890), an island off the coast of Germany (of which it is now part)
- Ada Kaleh (1878–1923) exclave of the Ottoman Empire comprising an island on the Danube, omitted from the Congress of Berlin, taken over by Romania.

== Culture and sports ==
- Association football club AS Monaco, though based in Monaco, plays in the French football league system. In contrast, Malta maintains its own league system with a 14-team top division.
- Some of the European microstates are members of the Games of the Small States of Europe (GSSE); several of the island dependencies compete in the Island Games, alongside several other island dependencies from elsewhere in the world. Countries that participate at the Games of the Small States of Europe are: Andorra, Cyprus, Iceland, Liechtenstein, Luxembourg, Malta, Monaco, Montenegro and San Marino.
- Monaco (from 1959 to 1979 and 2004 to 2006), Malta (since 1971), Andorra (from 2004 to 2009), and San Marino (debut in 2008, then from 2011 onwards) are or were contestant countries of Eurovision Song Contest.
- The San Marino national football team is the lowest-ranked FIFA-affiliated national football team, and is widely considered to be the worst association football team of all time.

== See also ==
- Enclave and exclave
- Games of the Small States of Europe, a biannual sports competition
