= Hoftag =

Historical legislature

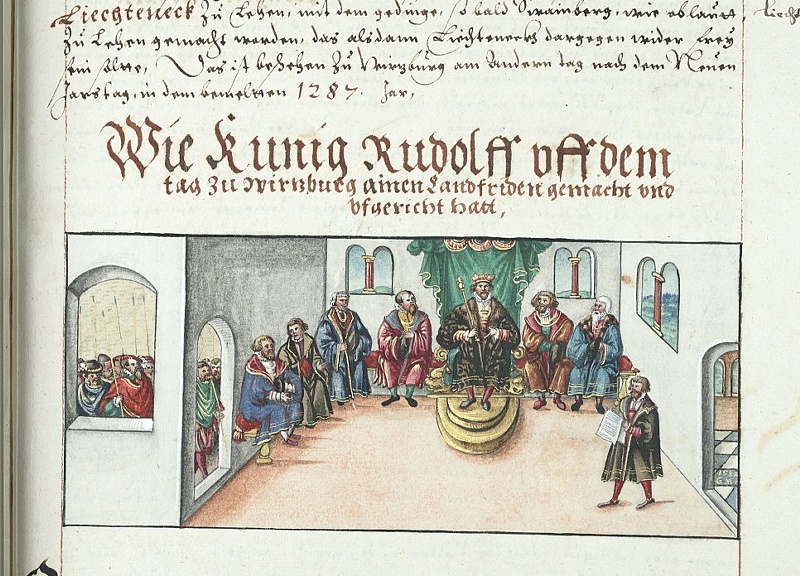
Depiction of a Hoftag from the chronicle of the bishops of Würzbürg, non-contemporary

A Hoftag (lit. 'court day', pl. Hoftage) was the name given to an informal and irregular assembly convened by the king of the Romans, the Holy Roman emperor or one of the princes of the Empire, with selected chief princes within the empire. Early scholarship also refers to these meetings as imperial diets (Reichstage), even though these gatherings were not really about the empire in general, but with matters concerning their individual rulers. In fact, the legal institution of the imperial diet appeared much later. In the early and high Middle Ages these assemblies were mostly held in the imperial palaces (Kaiserpfalz).

== History ==
=== High Middle Ages ===
From the feudal obligation of chief princes to stand by the king's side in word and deed, a consequent duty was derived by the time of the High Middle Ages to appear in person, at the request of the king, at royal assemblies in order to offer counsel and participate in decision-making. This was the so-called court attendance duty (Hoffahrtspflicht). The assemblies themselves were given various names in the different sources, such as parlamentum, conventus, colloquium, curia or curia regis. All these terms could be qualified with adjectives such as solemnis ("ceremonial") or magnus ("great") in order to clarify their nature. The Hoftag differed from the usual counsel meetings of the royal court essentially only in the additional participation of those invited. These could be princes, members of the nobility, prelates or representatives of foreign powers. From the 13th century, representatives of the free imperial cities were also invited to Hoftage. The assemblies were organised along the lines of a royal court meeting (Hofhaltung) and were firmly focussed on the king.

When the king held such assemblies and whom he invited was entirely at his discretion. Hence, a distinction between the counsel given by the princes and their legal consent to a decision is difficult to make. However, it was from their obligation to advise the king, that the right soon emerged for the princes to be consulted on important matters concerning the empire, such as the declaration of an imperial military campaign. Exactly which matters the king had to be advised on and seek the approval of the princes seems to have been largely at the discretion of the king, so the Hoftage certainly cannot be viewed as an institutionalized joint exercise of power by the princes.

=== Late Middle Ages ===
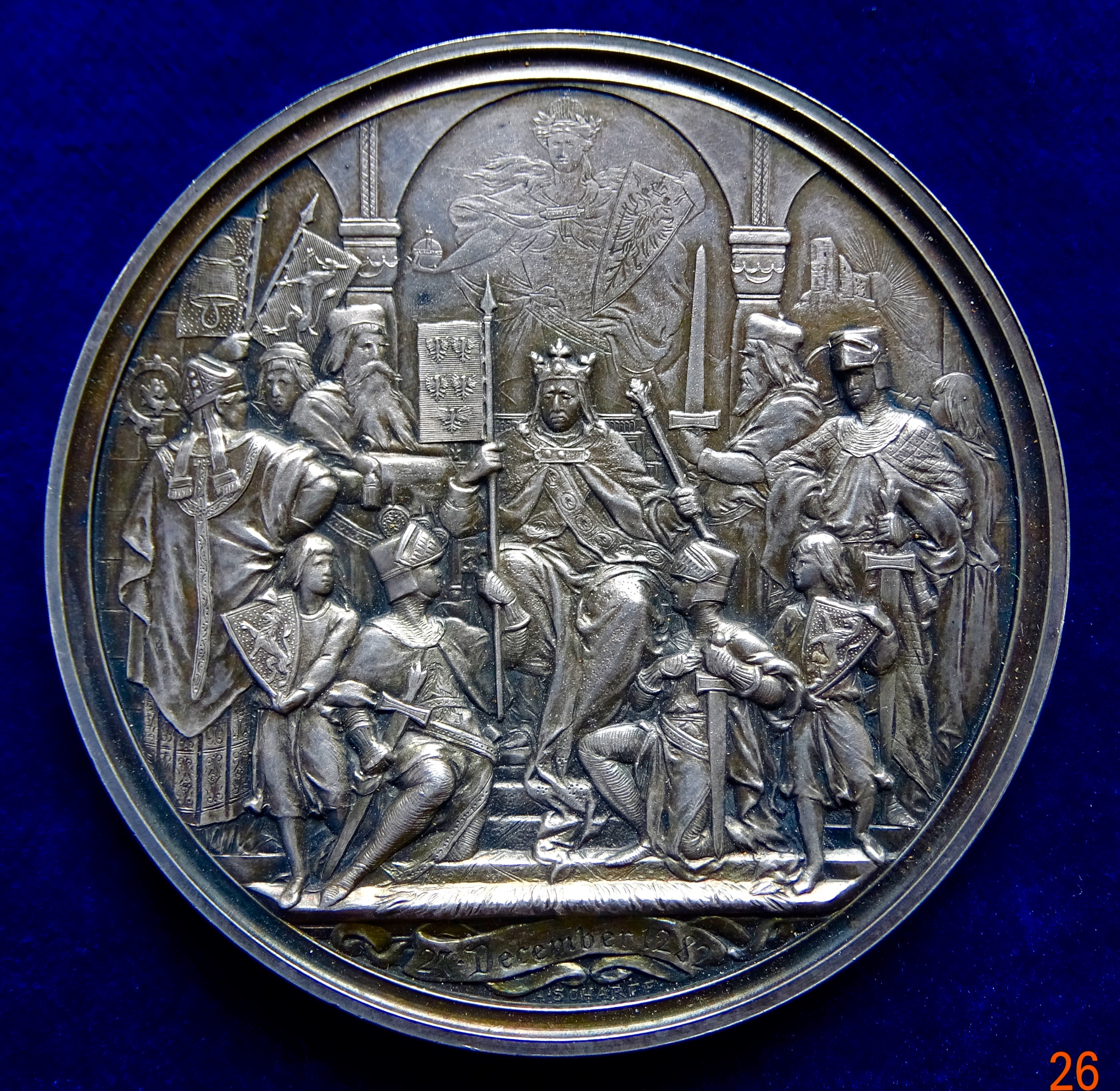
Augsburg 1282 Hoftag of King Rudolf I of Germany. Silver Medal by Scharff, obverse. 600th anniversary of the Habsburg monarchy 1882.

Documents of the High and Late Middle Ages containing important policy decisions or orders concerning imperial estates emphasize that the decisions were made with the "advice" and "consent" of the princes. Both terms are used in such documents synonymously from a legal point of view. Those princes who were not invited or who found themselves in opposition to the king, did not, however, feel bound by the decisions of the Hoftage.

Following the Great Interregnum of the 13th century, the role of the prince electors increased, since only they had the role of princes of the empire and gave their formal acceptance to royal decrees about imperial matters through so-called letters of consent (Willebriefe). But even here, no obligation is discernible on the part of king to call for such letters in his regulations.

== Decline ==
In the wake of the decline of the kingdom to its respective allodial estates at the end of the 14th century and the general weakness at the time of its count-kings (Grafenkönige), "kingless assemblies" (Königlose Tage) gained increasing importance. At these gatherings, the principal rulers in the empire held counsel. Only rarely were Hoftage now called. From these kingless assemblies emerged the legal institution of the Imperial Diet at the end of the 15th century.

== See also ==
- Locations of Imperial Diets
- Reichstag (Holy Roman Empire)

== Literature ==
- Karl-Friedrich Krieger: König, Reich und Reichsreform im Spätmittelalter. 2nd revised edition. Oldenbourg, Munich, 2005, ISBN 3-486-57670-4, (Enzyklopädie Deutscher Geschichte 14).
- Malte Prietzel: Das Heilige Römische Reich im Spätmittelalter. Wissenschaftliche Buchgesellschaft, Darmstadt, 2004, ISBN 3-534-15131-3, (Geschichte kompakt - Mittelalter).
- Gabriele Annas: Hoftag - Gemeiner Tag - Reichstag. Studien zur strukturellen Entwicklung deutscher Reichsversammlungen des späten Mittelalters (1349 - 1471). 2 volumes. Vandenhoeck & Ruprecht, Göttingen, 2004, ISBN 3-525-36061-4, (Schriftenreihe der Historischen Kommission bei der Bayerischen Akademie der Wissenschaften 68), (Zugleich: Köln, Univ., Diss., 1997), (with CD ROM: Verzeichnis der Besucher deutscher Reichsversammlungen des späten Mittelalters (1349 to 1471)).
