= Rukainiai =

- Village
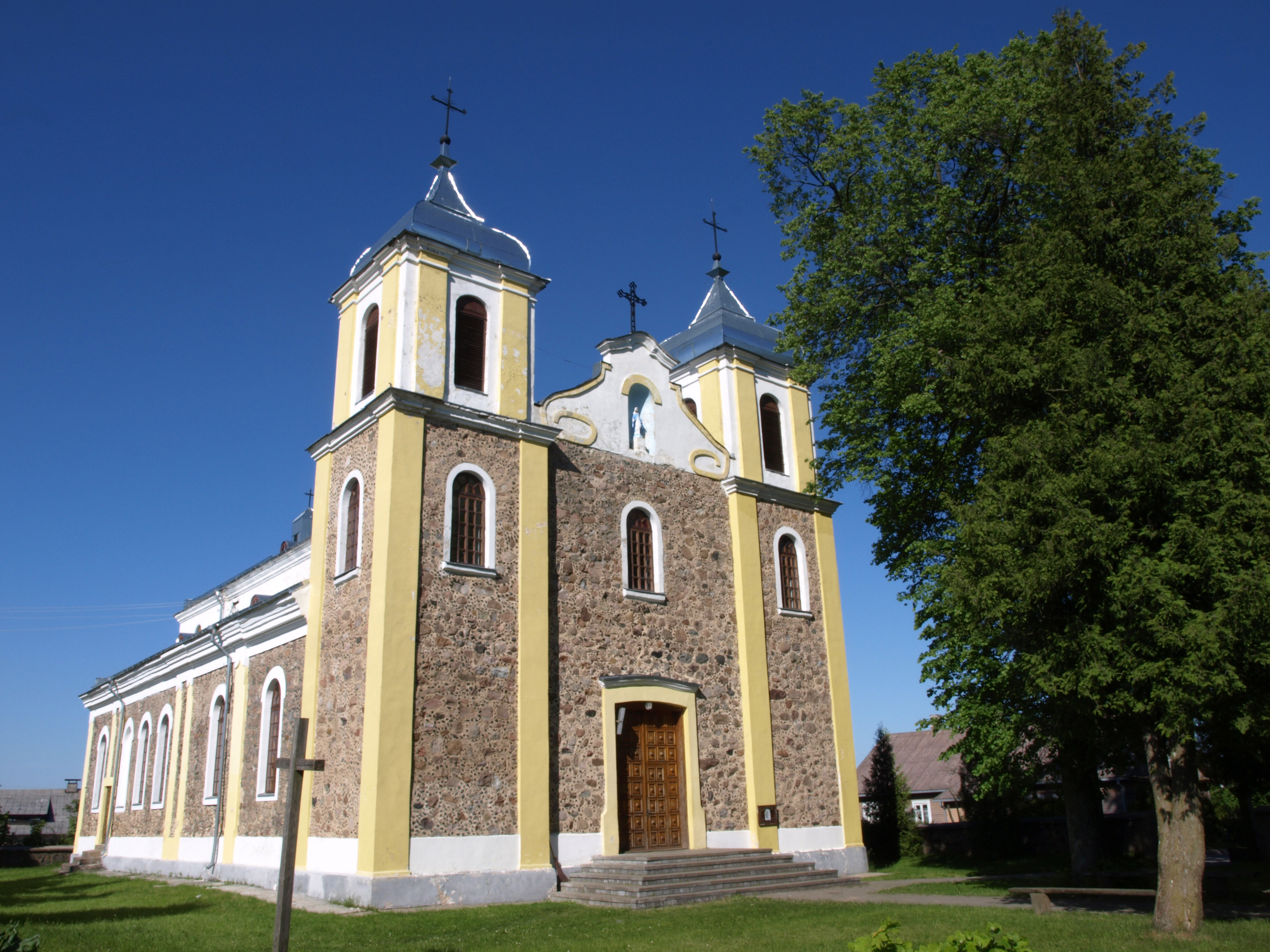
- Church of St. Michael the Archangel in Rukainiai

- Location of Rukainiai
- Coordinates: 54°36′50″N 25°30′29″E
- Country: Lithuania
- County: Vilnius County
- Municipality: Vilnius District Municipality
- Eldership: Rukainiai eldership

Population (2021)
  - Total: 662
- Time zone: UTC+2 (EET)
  - Summer (DST): UTC+3 (EEST)

Rukainiai (Lithuanian: Rukainiai; Polish: Rukojnie) is a village in the Vilnius District Municipality, Lithuania, located 12 km east of Vilnius city municipality, the Lithuanian capital, and 16 km from the border with Belarus. According to the 2021 census, Rukainiai had a population of 662, a decrease from 770 in 2011 and from 865 in 1989.

== History ==
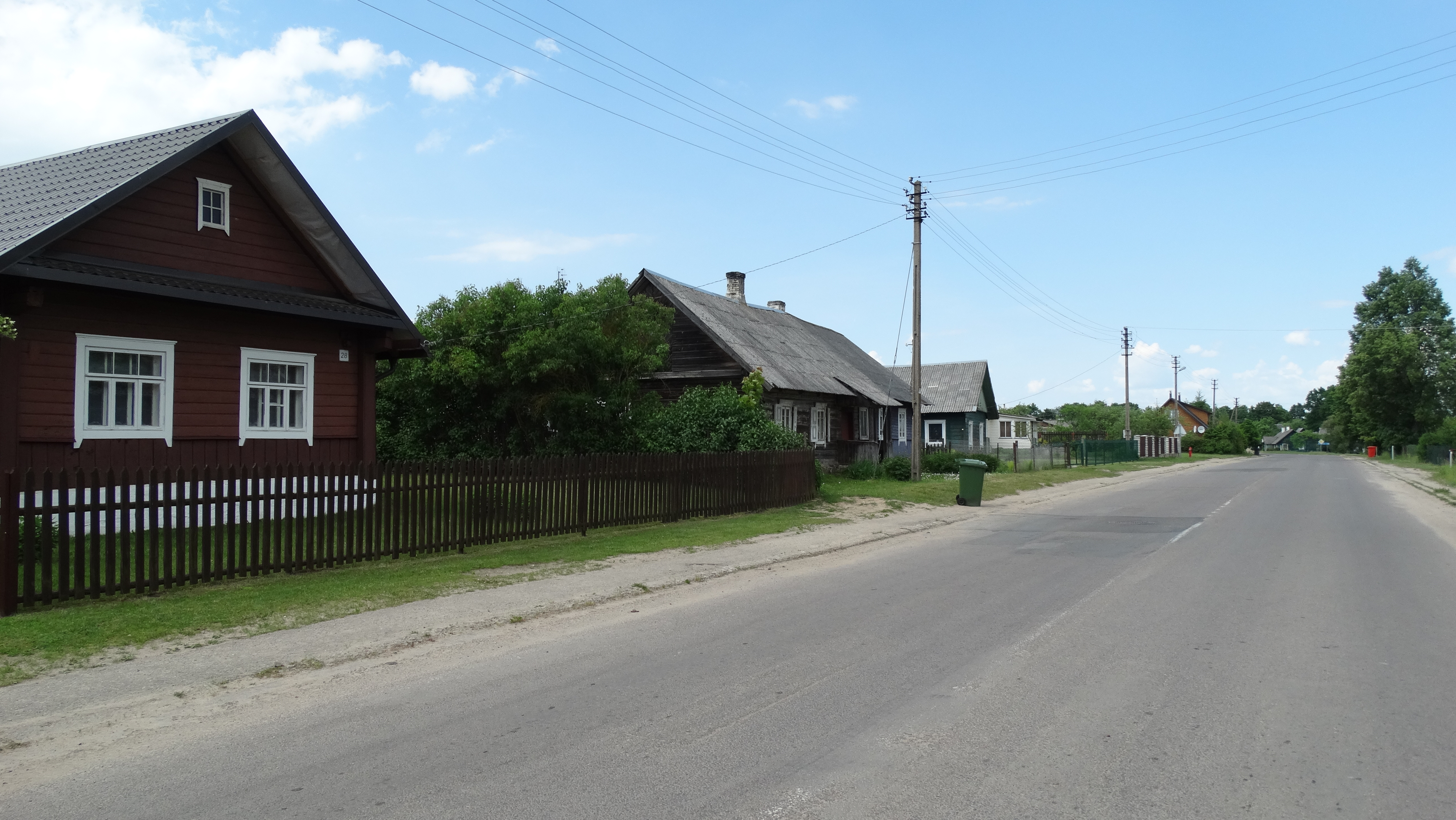
Traditional wooden houses in Rukainiai

Rukainiai is known from 1440 when Grand Duke Sigismund Kęstutaitis donated the village to the Archdiocese of Vilnius. Bishop Paweł Holszański, a member of the Lithuanian princely Olshanski family, sponsored the construction of a wooden church in 1538. In the 18th century, there was a parochial school in Rukainiai. The church was destroyed during the French invasion of Russia in 1812. It was replaced by a Romantic style stone church built in 1823, the Church of St. Michael the Archangel. Paweł Ksawery Brzostowski, famous as the founder of the Republic of Paulava, served as a priest in the newly built church.

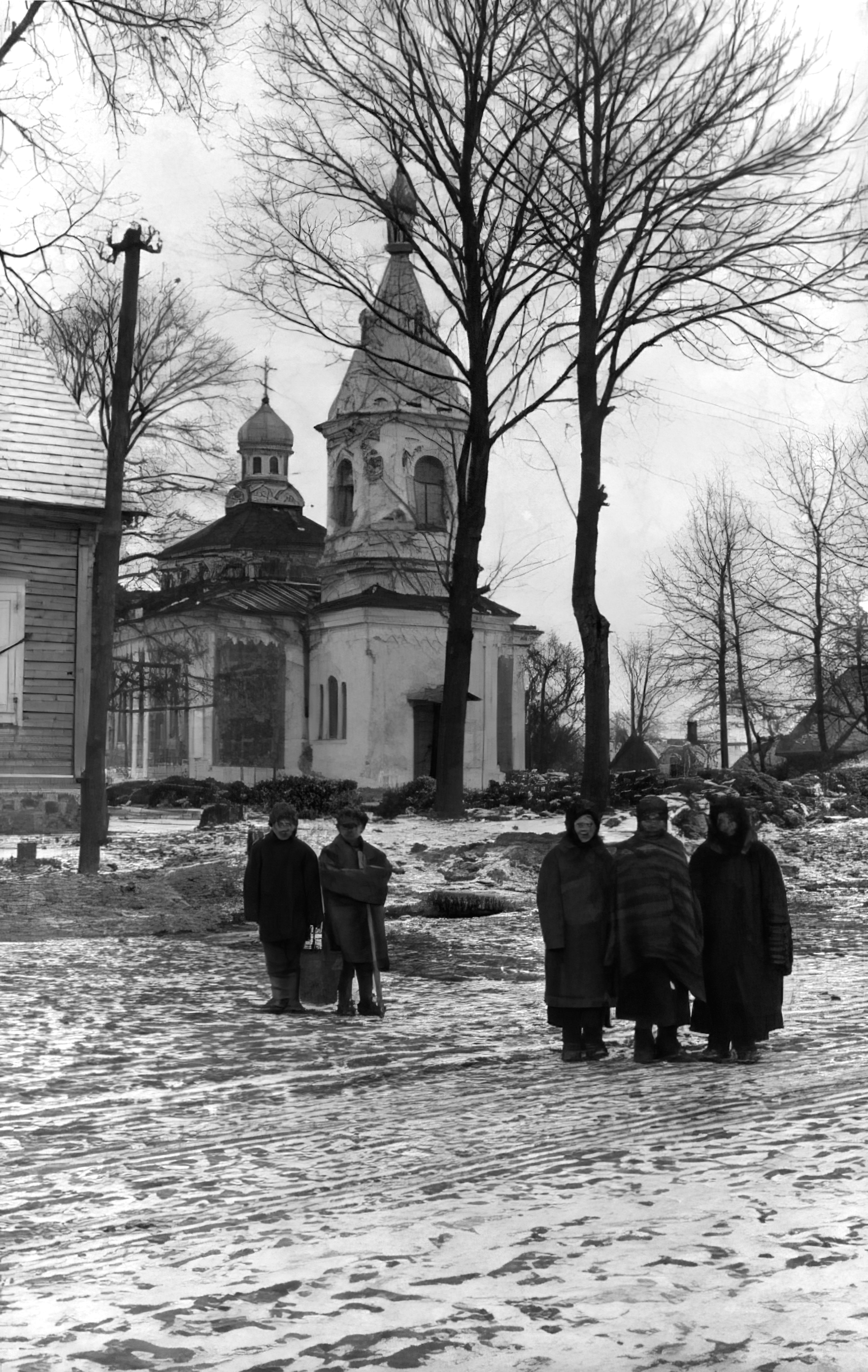
Orthodox church of the Protection of the Holy Virgin Rukainiai (1916)

For several years there was also a Russian Orthodox Church in the town, the Church of the Protection of the Holy Virgin, which was built in 1868 but destroyed in 1918.

Rukainiai is famous for its Christmas and Užgavėnės traditions.
