= Merkinė Manor (Šalčininkai) =

Residential manor in Lithuania

Coordinates: 54°27′17″N 25°28′23″E

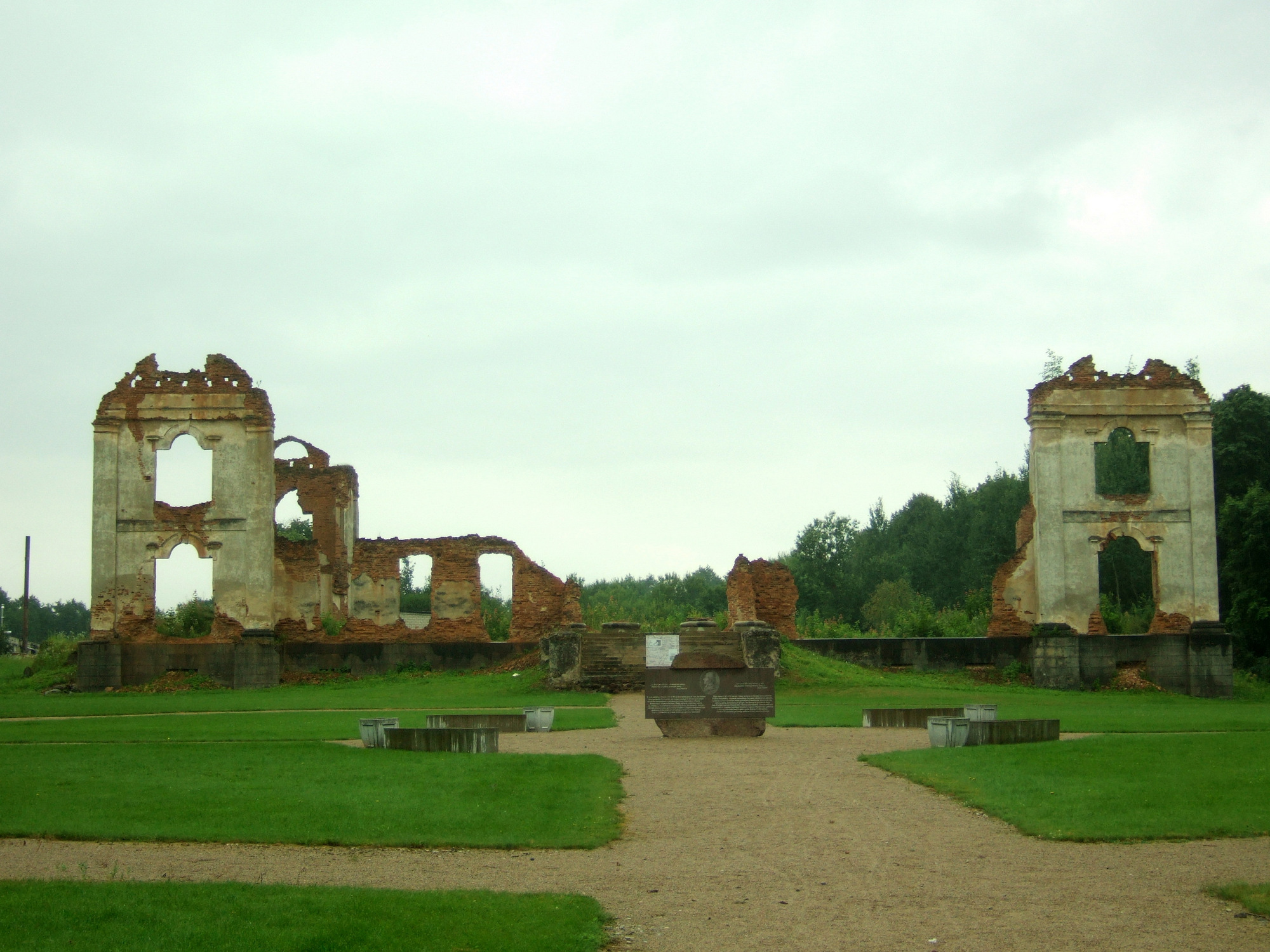
Merkinė Manor ruins

Merkinė Manor was a residential manor in Merkinė village, Šalčininkai District Municipality, Lithuania. It was the location of the self-proclaimed Paulava Republic, established by Paweł Ksawery Brzostowski in 1769. In 1770 Brzostowski hired Italian architect Carlo Spampani to build a new manor building in Neoclassical style. The building remained intact until after World War II, when it became a part of a sovkhoz, a Soviet-era farmstead. According to art historian Vladas Drėma, the manor was destroyed when one of the sovkhoz directors set fire to it to hide the traces of his grain thievery. Only ruins remained and the manor has not been rebuilt since, however, the area around it has been cleaned up and turned into a minor tourist attraction, with a memorial stone to commemorate the manor and the Paulava Republic.
