= Count-kings =

Historical description of certain medieval German rulers

Count-kings (German: Grafenkönige) was a description given by the historian Bernd Schneidmüller to the rulers of the Holy Roman Empire between the end of the Great Interregnum in 1273 and the final acquisition of the royal throne by the Habsburg dynasty in 1438. They were as follows:

- Rudolf of Habsburg, king (1273–1291)
- Adolf of Nassau, king (1292–1298)
- Albert I of Habsburg, king (1298–1308)
- Henry VII of Luxembourg, king from 1308, emperor (1312–1313)
- Louis IV the Bavarian, king from 1314, emperor (1328–1347), House of Wittelsbach
- Charles IV of Luxembourg, king from 1346 (re-elected in 1347), emperor (1355–1378)
- Wenceslaus of Luxembourg, king (1378–1400)
- Rupert of the Palatinate, king (1401–1410), House of Wittelsbach
- Jobst of Moravia, king (1410–1411), House of Luxembourg
- Sigismund of Luxembourg, king from 1410, emperor (1433–1437)

This categorisation is, however, not universally recognised by historians. In fact, during this period only Rudolph I, Adolphus of Nassau and Henry VII were imperial counts; all the other kings were dukes or (Bohemian) kings and prince-electors.

== See also ==
- Anti-king#Germany
- Interregnum (HRE)

== Literature ==
- Bernd Schneidmüller: Die Kaiser des Mittelalters, C. H. Beck, Munich, 2006, ISBN 3-406-53598-4.
