= Kleinstaaterei =

Historical territorial fragmentation in Germany

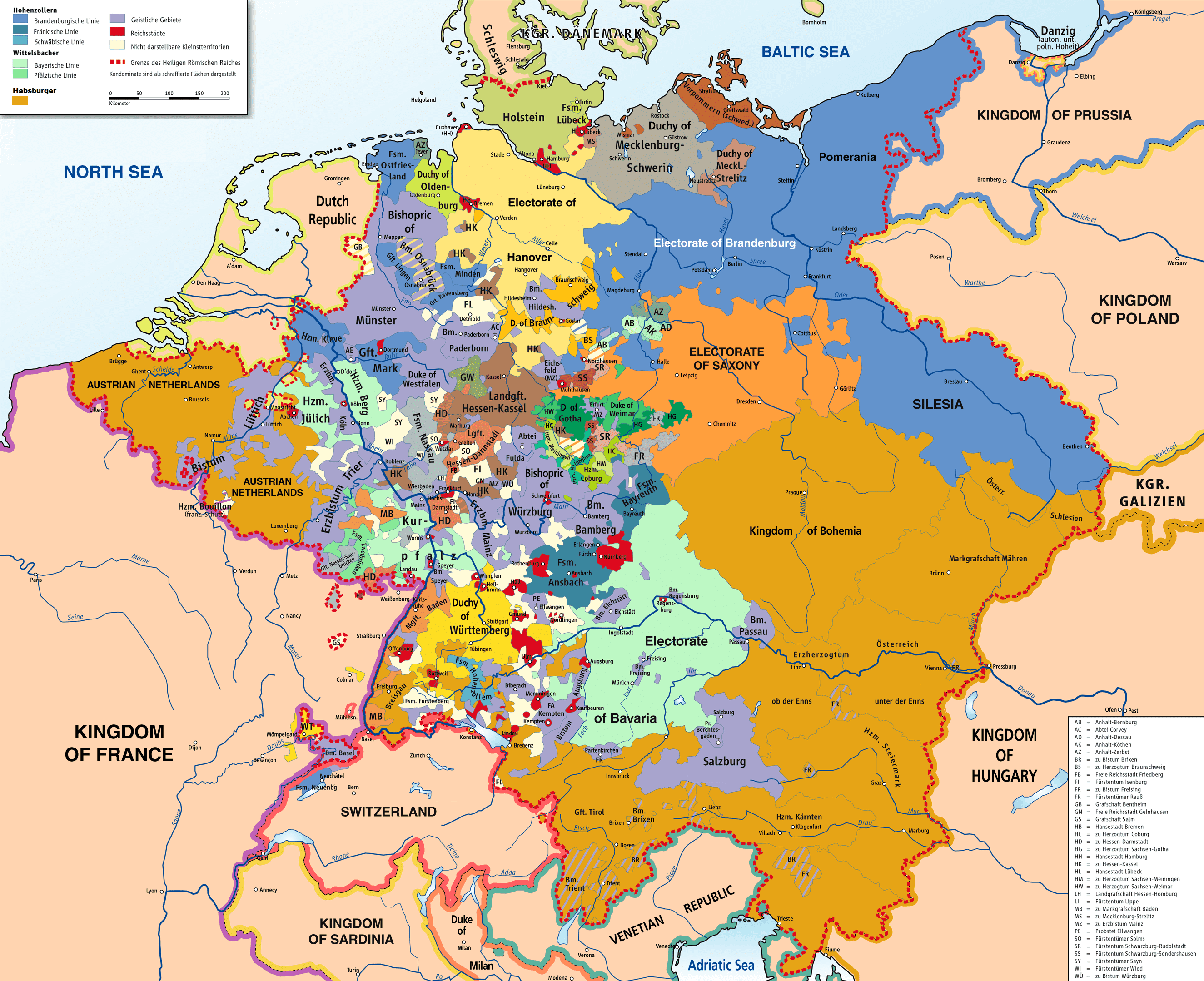
The Holy Roman Empire in 1789

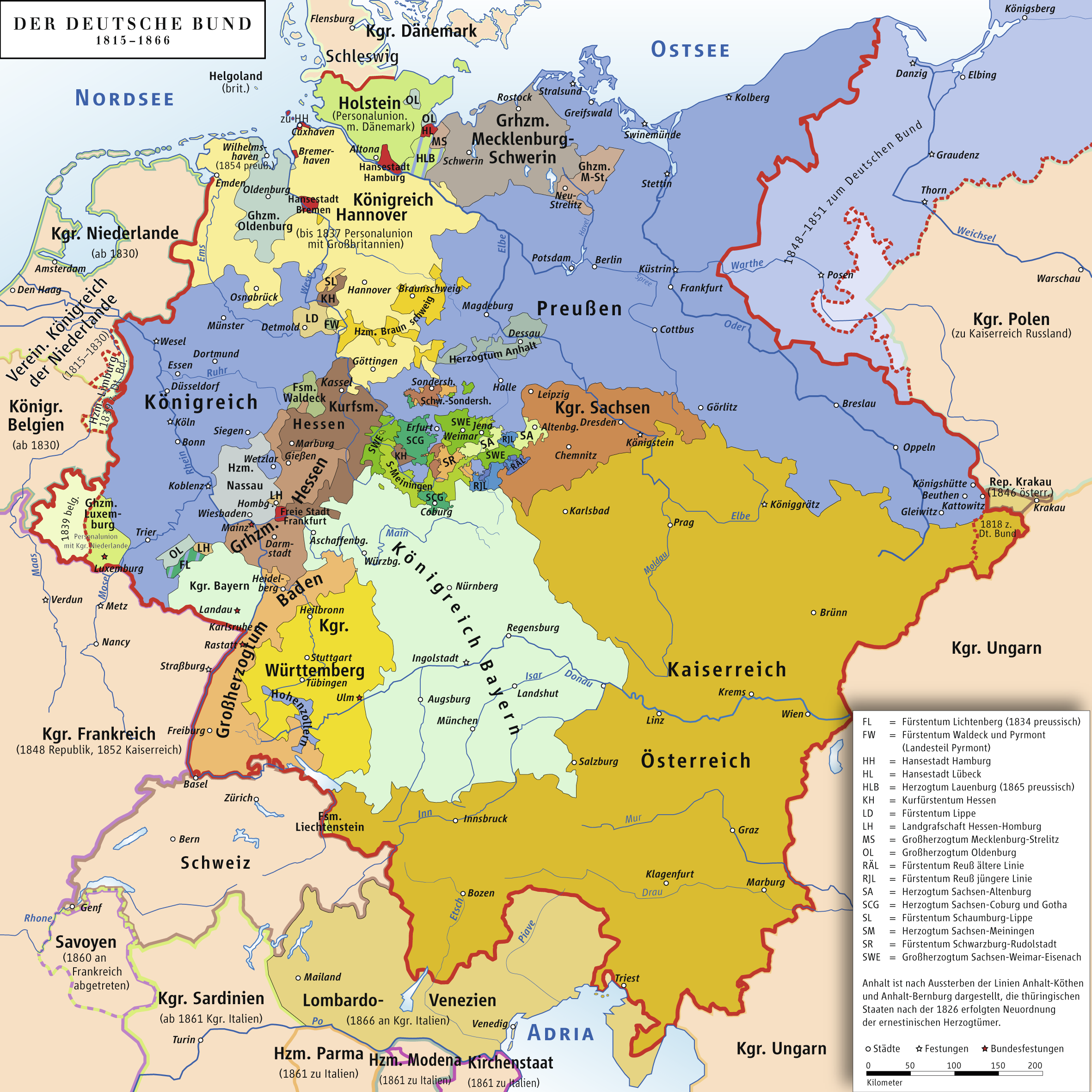
The German Confederation (1815–1866) still included a number of very small states

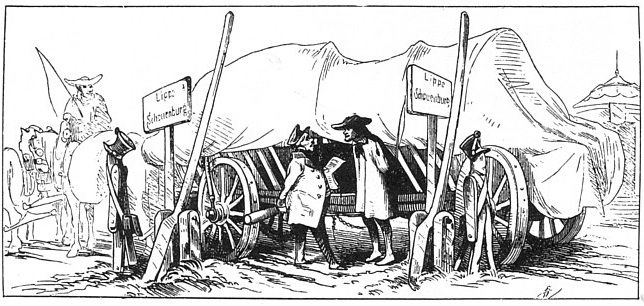
A German cartoon from 1834 poking fun at the tiny size of the Principality of Schaumburg-Lippe, one of the many tiny states of the German Confederation

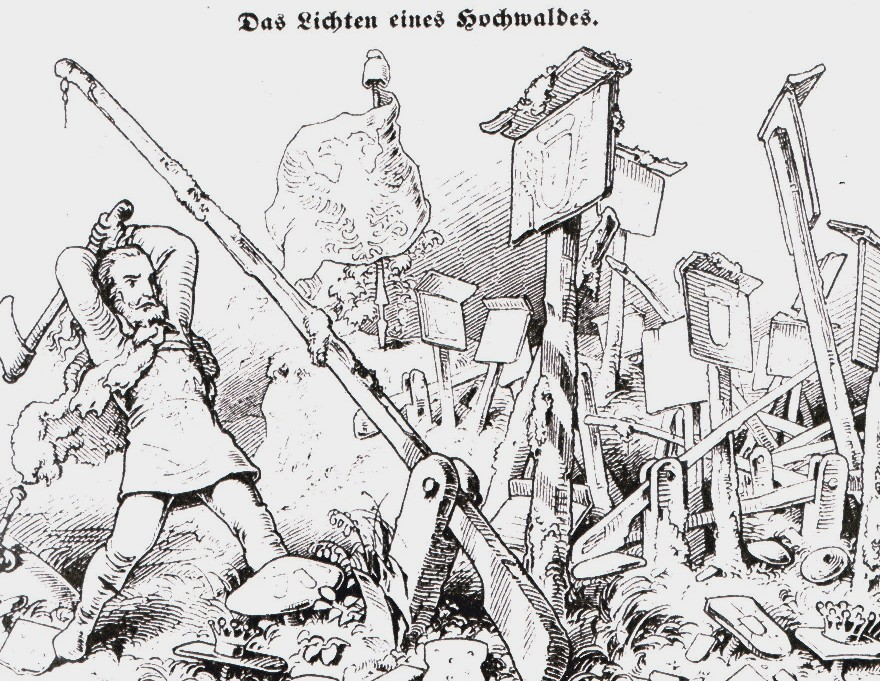
Early 19th century anti-Kleinstaaterei cartoon calling for the elimination of the myriad custom barriers between statelets

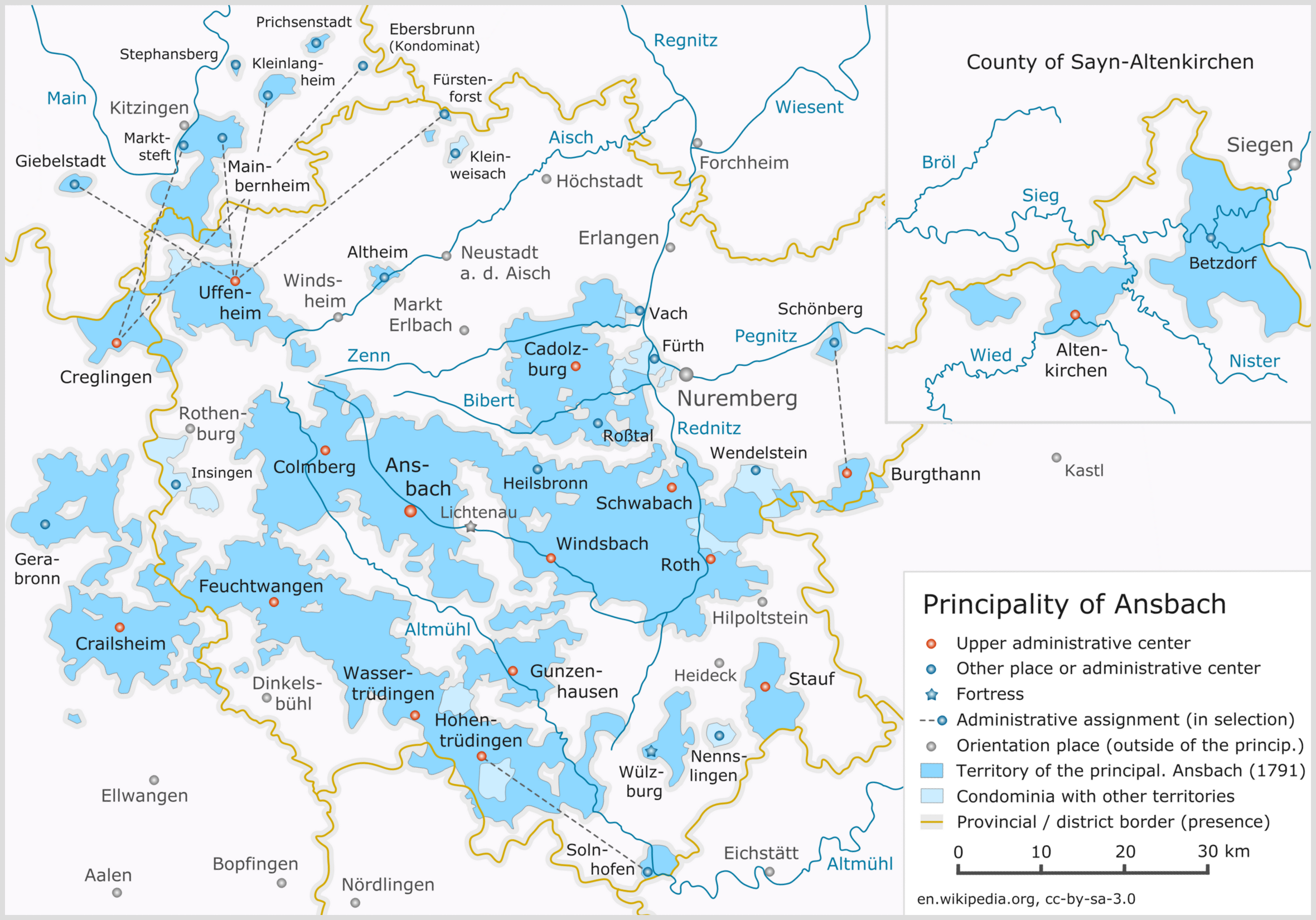
The hyper-fragmented Principality of Ansbach

The Prince-Bishopric of Liège was the French-speaking counterpart of German Kleinstaaterei, part of the Holy Roman Empire for 800 years

Kleinstaaterei (German: [ˌklaɪnʃtaːtəˈʁaɪ], lit. 'small-state-ery') is a pejorative term coined in the early 19th century to denote the territorial fragmentation of Germany. While the term referred primarily to the territorial fragmentation of the German Confederation, it is also applied by extension to the even more extreme territorial fragmentation of the Holy Roman Empire. In this period, Germany was split into a great number of nearly sovereign small and medium-sized secular and ecclesiastical principalities and free imperial cities, some of which were little larger than a single town or the surrounding grounds of the monastery of an Imperial abbey. Estimates of the total number of German states at any time during the 18th century vary, ranging from 294 to 348, or more. However, the number of states rapidly decreased with the onset of German mediatisation in the early 19th century.

Territorial fragmentation was compounded by the haphazard territorial formation of many states or the partition of dynastic states through inheritance, marriage, dowries, etc. As a result, a very large number of Holy Roman Empire states were constituted of non-contiguous parts, which resulted in many enclaves and exclaves.

As an illustration of Germany's territorial fragmentation, young Wilhelm von Humboldt and his friends, in order to observe the revolutionary events unfolding in Paris in the summer of 1789, traveled from Brunswick, capital of Brunswick-Wolfenbüttel, to France, entering and exiting six duchies, four bishoprics and one free imperial city (Aachen) before reaching the French border.

== History ==
The powerful and autonomous German stem duchies, which existed before the demise of the Carolingian Empire and the formation of East Francia during the 9th century, shaped the federal character of the Holy Roman Empire. A college of the Imperial princes elected the king from among the territorial dukes after the Carolingian line died out around the year 898. This system prevented the development of a strong centralized monarchy as local rulers, who sought to promote their own interests and autonomy, often rebelled against the sovereign ruler and conflicts had to be solved on the battlefield.

The imperial interregna between 1245 and 1312 and between 1378 and 1433 increased political instability and strengthened the communal movements, such as the Swabian League of Cities, the Hanseatic League and the Swiss Confederacy. Feuding among the lesser territorial nobility, who received their fief from the territorial princes, led to conflicts such as the Thuringian Counts' War and further territorial fragmentation. The Free imperial cities, many of them founded by the German kings and emperors during the 10th to 13th century, had initially been administered by the Imperial nobility (Vogte), direct vassals of the emperor. These towns gradually gained independence as their patrician city magistrates assumed full control of administration and judiciary in the jurisdiction.

The political fragmentation of the Empire was the single most salient characteristic of German history throughout the early modern period; it underlay and conditioned development in all areas of public life.

While in some other European states such as France, centralized states emerged as a result of early modern political concentration and centralisation, the Habsburg dynasty, who already controlled the Duchy of Austria, Kingdom of Bohemia and Kingdom of Hungary, ruled the Holy Roman Empire from 1438 and managed to permanently occupy the imperial throne until 1806 (with a brief exception between 1742 and 1765). The Habsburg family, however pursued its Grand Strategy policy, that focused on long-term dynastic reign at the center of a vast, multi-layered and multi-ethnic realm against Bourbon France and the Ottoman Empire. The imperial lands rather served to retain buffer zones that were at odds with any concepts of patriotism and national identity.

In 1495 emperor Maximilian I attempted to reform the empire. An Imperial supreme court (Reichskammergericht) was established, imperial taxes were levied, and the power of the Imperial Diet (Reichstag) was increased. The reforms, however, were frustrated by the continued territorial fragmentation of the Empire. The Protestant Reformation represented a major threat to imperial integrity. Emperor Charles V stated in 1546: "if we failed to intervene now, all the Estates of Germany would be in danger of breaking with the faith". With the 1548 Augsburg Interim he attempted to reconcile the religious schism in Germany, but instead only prompted new Protestant defiance.

In the 17th century the Kingdom of Prussia emerged as the second dominant power, which also incorporated substantial non-German territories and lands beyond the borders of the empire, while excluding major parts of Germany proper.

Apart from these two states, the Holy Roman Empire consisted of hundreds of small, German-speaking principalities, most of which derived from successive dynastic splits (feudal fragmentation), sometimes reflected in compound names such as Saxe-Coburg; some of these were united through royal marriages, although the resulting entity was often not a contiguous territory. During the early modern period, these small states modernised their military, judicial, and economic administrations. These hardly existed at the imperial level, and the emperor was little more than a feudalistic confederal figurehead, without political or military clout. After the Reformation, the Empire's small states were divided along religious lines. Those headed by Roman Catholic dynasties faced those ruled by Protestant dynasties in the Thirty Years' War and other conflicts.

After French Emperor Napoleon Bonaparte forced the Holy Roman Emperor, Francis II, to dissolve the Empire in 1806, Kleinstaaterei was altered, but not eliminated. Through the elimination of territories ruled by prince-bishops (secularisation) and through the consolidation of neighbouring principalities, enclaves and exclaves, Napoleon reduced several hundred states into a relative concentration of a little over two dozen states in the Confederation of the Rhine. This confederation did not survive Napoleon's military defeat at the hands of the allies, but the previous principalities were not entirely restored. Prussia and the Austrian Empire—the successor state to the Habsburg Monarchy—were the only major German powers, and neither had been part of the Confederation of the Rhine. The victorious allies, including Prussia and Austria, decided at the Congress of Vienna (1814–15) on widespread dynastic restorations, although some of Napoleon's consolidations were maintained, and Austria and Prussia helped themselves to some formerly independent territories. The resulting territorial division resulted in a consolidated version—around 40 states—of the pre-Napoleonic Kleinstaaterei.

The rise of nationalism across Europe brought movements striving for "nation-states", each governing an entire (ethno-cultural) people. German nationalists began to insist on a unified Germany. The call for a unified nation-state was one of the central demands of the Revolutions of 1848, but the ruling dynasties of the smaller German states and of multinational Austria and Prussia managed to resist nationalist efforts at unification. A notable figure opposed to national unification was German writer and statesman Johann Wolfgang von Goethe, writing: "Frankfurt, Bremen, Hamburg, Lübeck are large and brilliant, and their impact on the prosperity of Germany is incalculable. Yet, would they remain what they are if they were to lose their independence and be incorporated as provincial cities into one great German Empire? I have reason to doubt this."

Only after Prussian Chancellor Otto von Bismarck gradually built a unified German state under the Prussian royal House of Hohenzollern did Kleinstaaterei largely end in 1871 with the founding of the German Empire. (The only surviving petty states—Luxembourg and Liechtenstein—lie at the periphery of the German-speaking world.) The founding of the German Empire created a largely German nation-state. While the German Empire excluded the partly German but multinational Habsburg domains of Austria–Hungary, it included a substantial Polish minority living in the eastern area of land under Prussian rule and other minorities along its northern and western borders. The unification of the German Empire put Germany on the map as a major European power, albeit too late to become a major colonial presence. Internally, some of these fragmented boundaries and small political units continued to exist until the modern states of Germany were established in the Federal Republic after World War II.

The decentralised nature of Kleinstaaterei made it difficult for the German economy to live up to its potential. Varying systems of weights and measures, different currencies and numerous tariffs impeded trade and investment, although the creation of the German Customs Union in 1834 had begun to lift these barriers. The startling rapidity of Germany's economic growth after unification under Bismarck provided further evidence that the Kleinstaaterei had been economically repressive. The system did contribute to cultural diversity within Germany, and the numerous rival courts—though usually politically insignificant—often gained some renown through patronage.

== Modern German usage ==
Today, the term Kleinstaaterei is sometimes used in the German media and elsewhere in a figurative sense to describe the German political system of federalism in a critical way, especially referring to its seeming inefficiency to decide on reforms in political fields that are the responsibility of the states of Germany and thus are under the auspices of sixteen different administrations. As of 2010, Kleinstaaterei is most often invoked in matters of educational policy, such as the difficulties caused by the different school systems for children of families that move from one state to another.

== See also ==
- Balkanisation
- List of Imperial Diet participants (1792)
- List of states in the Holy Roman Empire
- Petty kingdom
- Federalism in Germany
