= Free State of Schwenten =

Former country in Europe

Free State of Schwenten Freistaat Schwenten (German) Republika Świętnieńska (Polish)
- 1919–1919
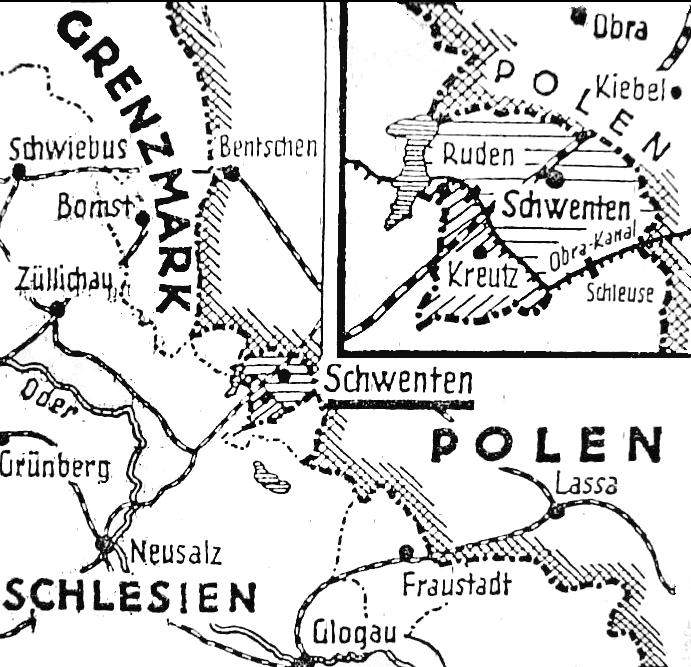
- Map published in Die Grenze Post on 25 December 1932 with Schwenten on it.
- Capital: Schwenten
- Common languages: German, Polish
- Government: Republic
- President
  - 1919: Emil Gustav Hegemann
- History
  - Established: 6 January 1919
  - Disestablished: 10 August 1919
Preceded by	Succeeded by
Free State of Schwenten	Weimar Republic
- Today part of: Poland

The Free State of Schwenten (German: Freistaat Schwenten; Polish: Wolne Państwo Świętno), also known as Republic of Świętno (Polish: Republika Świętnieńska), was an independent state proclaimed in 1919 with the village of Schwenten/Świętno, until then belonging to Germany, today belonging Poland, as its capital. The declaration of independence had a defensive character, as local government was aware of the Polish uprising in Greater Poland. The polity existed for 7 months until it joined the Weimar Republic (Germany).
