= Interregnum (Holy Roman Empire) =

Historical periods with no emperor

There were many imperial interregna in the history of the Holy Roman Empire, when there was no emperor. Interregna in which there was no emperor-elect (King of the Romans) were rarer. Among the longest periods without an emperor were between 924 and 962 (38 years), between 1250 and 1312 (62 years), and between 1378 and 1433 (55 years). The crisis of government of the Holy Roman Empire and the Kingdom of Germany thus lasted throughout the late medieval period, and ended only with the rise of the House of Habsburg on the eve of the German Reformation and the Renaissance.

The term Great Interregnum is occasionally used for the period between the death of Frederick II in 1250 and the accession of Rudolf I in 1273.

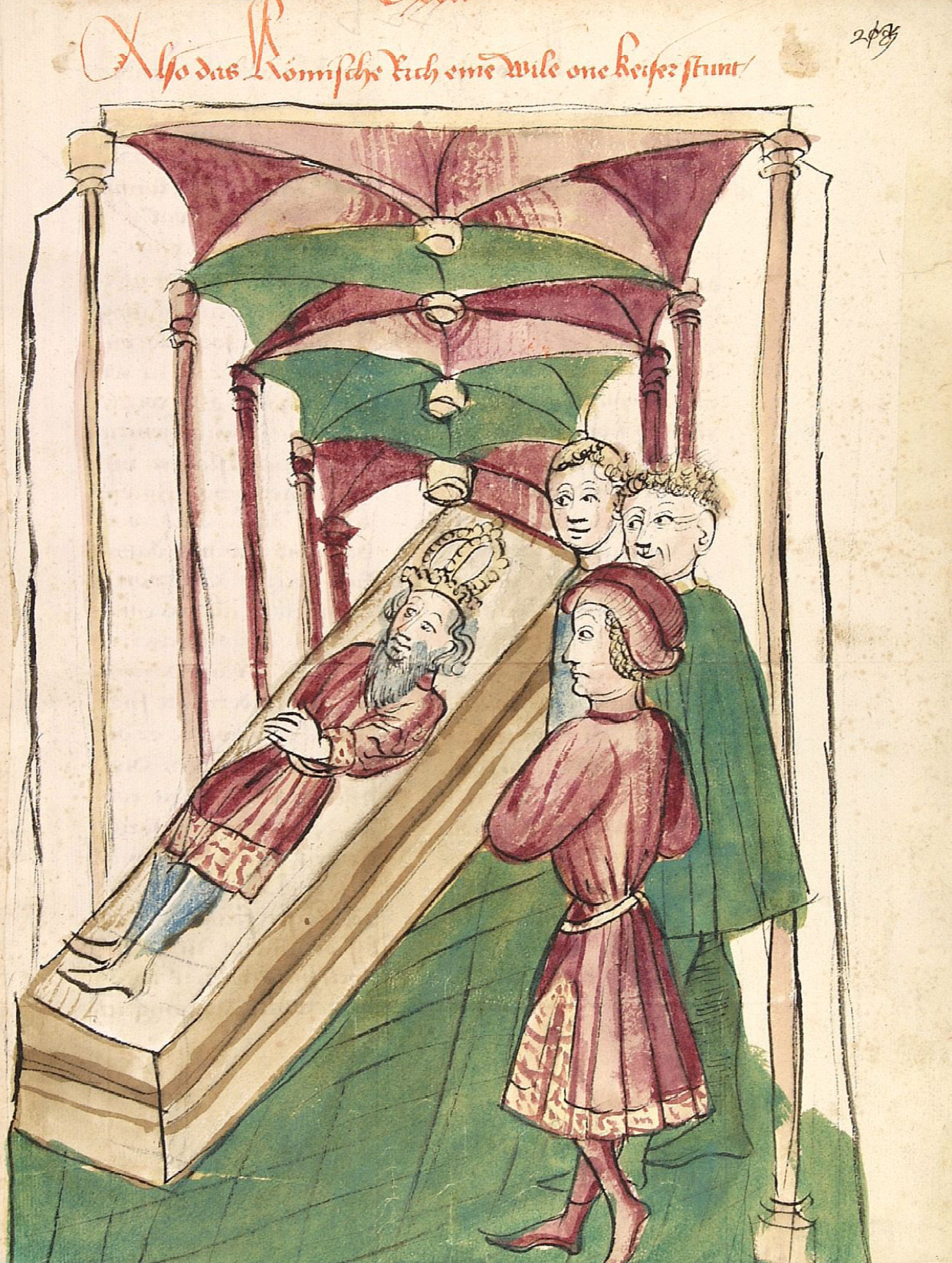
Depiction of the Interregnum in Chronicon pontificum et imperatorum (c. 1450), showing three men standing at the tomb of an emperor with the caption "Thus the Roman Empire for a time had no emperor" (German: Also das Römische rich eine Wile one keiser stunt).

After the deposition of Frederick II by Pope Innocent IV in 1245, Henry Raspe, Landgrave of Thuringia was set up as anti-king to Frederick's son Conrad IV (d. 1254). Frederick’s deposition was widely regarded as illegitimate, and no monarch in Europe offered any meaningful support for Innocent in his crusade against the emperor—whose immense status and legendary reputation as perhaps the greatest monarch of his day continued undiminished, especially in the vast Hohenstaufen core holdings. In Germany, particularly in Swabia, most of Franconia, and the south, Hohenstaufen power remained formidable and the papal cause could only rely on the support of the major ecclesiastical princes. The secular princes of Germany were either loyal to the Hohenstaufen or took a neutral stance.

Henry Raspe was killed in 1247 and succeeded as anti-king by William of Holland (d. 1256). Throughout 1249–1250 Conrad IV had steadily defeated William, whose power never extended beyond a tenuous hold north of the Rhine, and extracted a truce from the major ecclesiastical princes. Everywhere, papal crusade against the Hohenstaufen appeared to be disintegrating. By Frederick II’s death in late 1250, the emperor controlled most of Italy and his son enjoyed a relatively solid base across southern and central Germany. The Hohenstaufen remained the most prestigious, powerful and preeminent dynasty in Europe. However, buoyed by Frederick’s death, the papacy remained intransigent and Conrad IV was unable to secure the imperial mantle and died of malaria near Rome in 1254 while consolidating his Sicilian inheritance in southern Italy.

Conrad’s death and the extreme youth of his son, Conradin, signaled an implosion in the Hohenstaufen dynastic power and after the 1257 imperial election, the crown was contested between Richard of Cornwall, who was supported by the Guelph party, and Alfonso X of Castile, who was recognized by the Hohenstaufen party but never set foot on German soil. After Richard's death in 1273, Rudolf I of Germany, a minor pro-Staufen count, was elected. He was the first of the Habsburgs to hold a royal title, but he was never crowned emperor. Alfonso held on to his claim to the throne until 1275. After Rudolf's death in 1291, Adolf and Albert were two further weak kings who were never crowned emperor starting a line of so-called count-kings which lasted to the establishment of a de facto hereditary monarchy by the Habsburgs in the 15th century.

Albert was assassinated in 1308. Almost immediately, King Philip IV of France began aggressively seeking support for his brother, Charles of Valois, to be elected the next King of the Romans. Philip thought he had the backing of the French Pope Clement V (established at Avignon in 1309), and that his prospects of bringing the empire into the orbit of the French royal house were good. He lavishly spread French money in the hope of bribing the German electors. Although Charles of Valois had the backing of Henry, Archbishop of Cologne, a French supporter, many were not keen to see an expansion of French power, least of all Clement V. The principal rival to Charles appeared to be Rudolf, the Count Palatine.

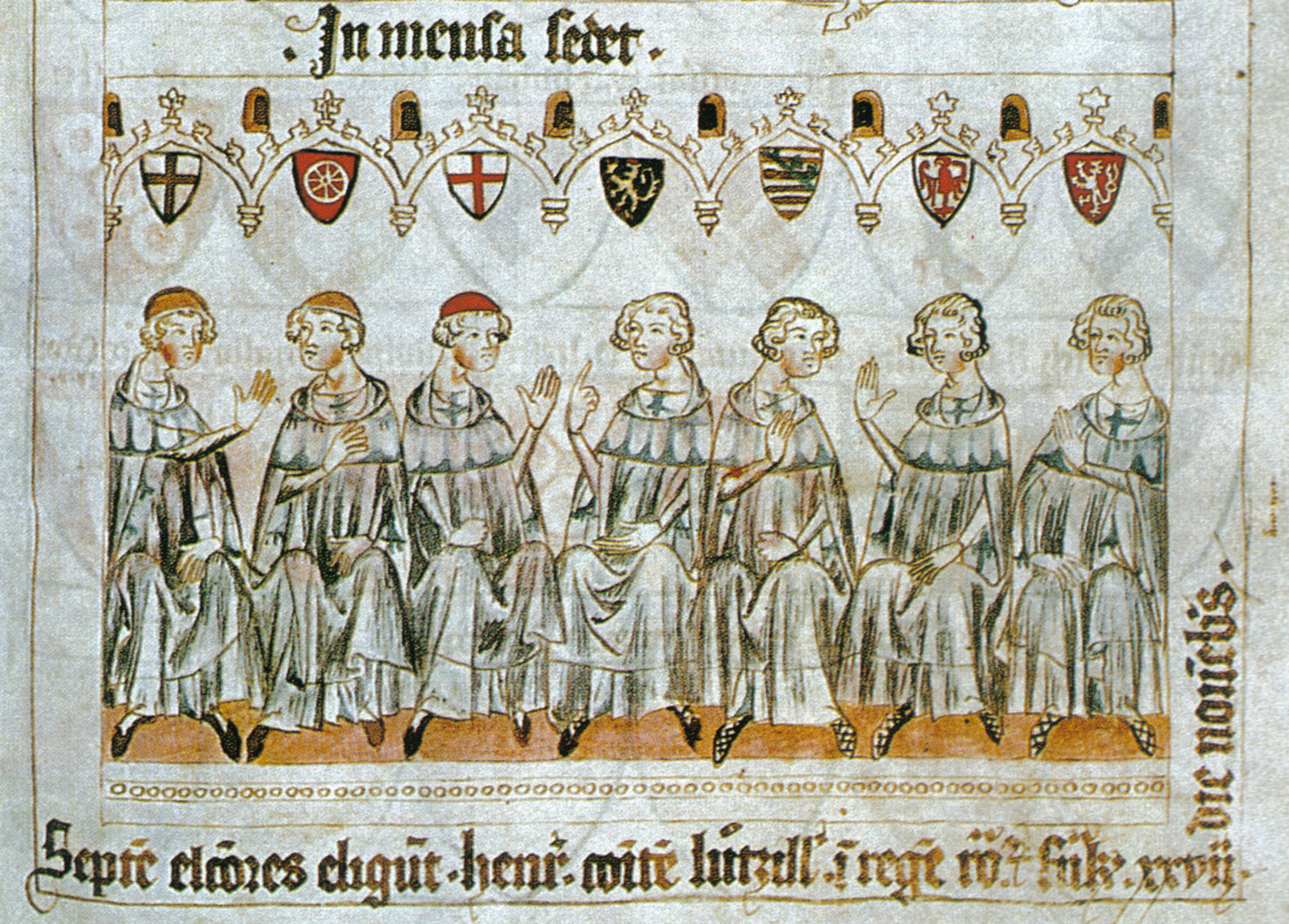
The seven prince-electors voting for Henry, Balduineum picture chronicle, 1341

Instead, Henry VII, of the House of Luxembourg, was elected with six votes at Frankfurt on 27 November 1308. Given his background, although he was a vassal of king Philip, Henry was bound by few national ties, an aspect of his suitability as a compromise candidate among the electors, the great territorial magnates who had lived without a crowned emperor for decades, and who were unhappy with both Charles and Rudolf. Henry of Luxembourg's brother, Baldwin, Archbishop of Trier, won over a number of the electors, including Henry, in exchange for some substantial concessions. Henry VII was crowned king at Aachen on 6 January 1309, and emperor by Pope Clement V on 29 June 1312 in Rome, ending the interregnum.

However, political instability in Germany re-emerged after Henry's untimely death in 1314. Louis IV was opposed by Frederick the Fair, and later by Charles IV, and Charles IV in turn (briefly) by Günther of Schwarzburg, ruling unopposed only from 1350. His successors Wenceslaus, Rupert and Jobst again were not crowned emperor. Sigismund (r. 1411–1437) was crowned emperor in 1433, but only with Frederick III (r. 1452–1493), the second emperor of the House of Habsburg, did the Holy Roman Emperor return to an unbroken succession of emperors ending (with the exception of Charles VII all of the House of Habsburg) until its dissolution in 1806.

The crisis of the interregnum established the college of prince-electors as the only source of legitimacy of the German king. At the same time, the lack of central government strengthened the communal movements, such as the Swabian League of Cities, the Hanseatic League and the Swiss Confederacy. It also encouraged increased feuding among the lesser nobility, leading to conflicts such as the Thuringian Counts' War, leading to a general state of near-anarchy in Germany where robber barons acted unopposed by the nominal system of justice. Germany was fractured into countless minor states fending for themselves, a condition that would persist into the modern period and, termed Kleinstaaterei, present an obstacle to the modern project of national unification.

== See also ==
- Anti-king#Germany
- Crisis of the Late Middle Ages
- Feudalism in the Holy Roman Empire
- Formation of the Old Swiss Confederacy
- Guelphs and Ghibellines
- Hanseatic League
- Imperial immediacy
- Interrex
- List of German monarchs
- Medieval commune
- Prince-elector
- Städtebund
- Translatio imperii
- Western Schism
