= Świętno, Greater Poland Voivodeship =

Świętno
- Village
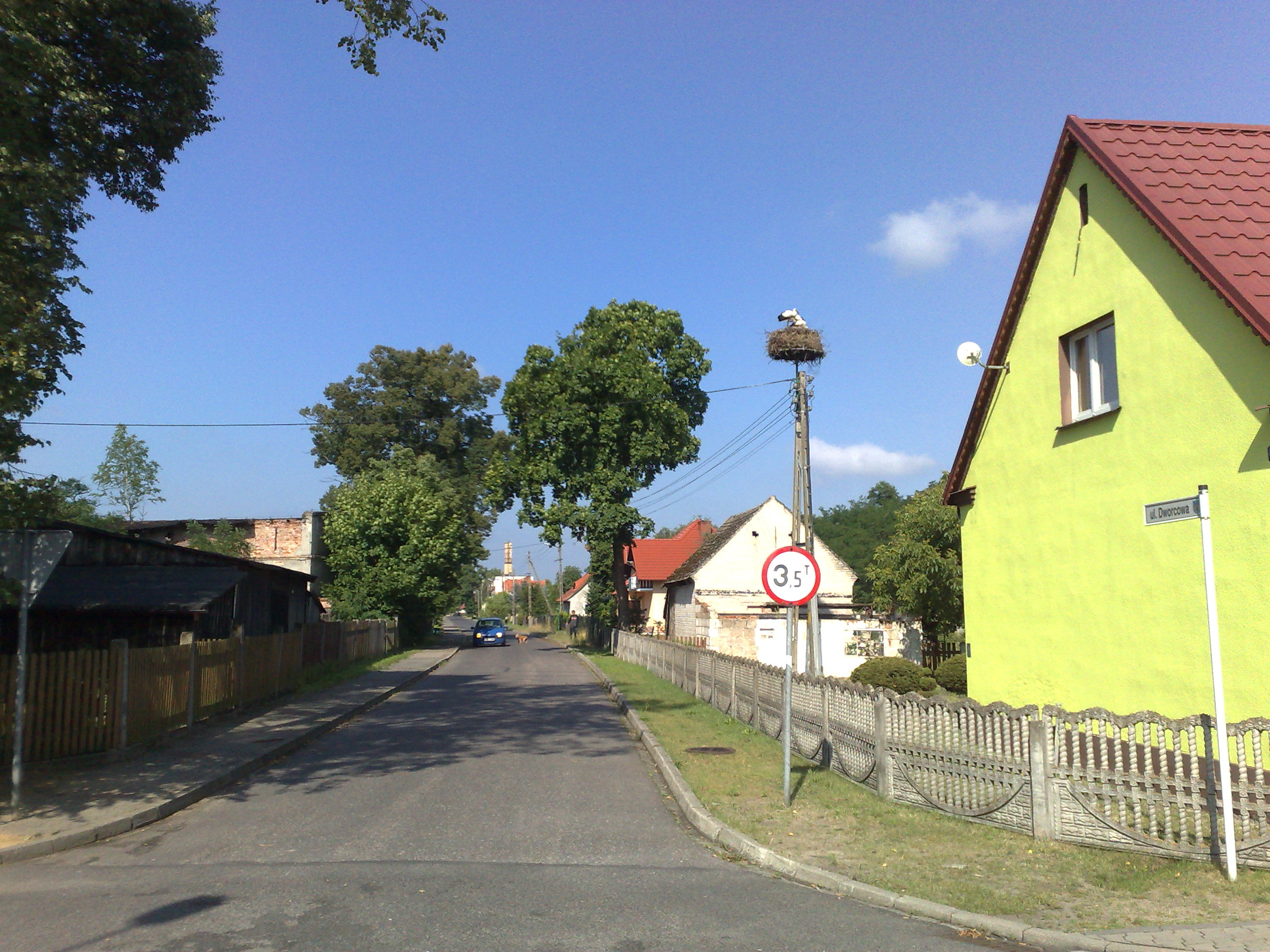

- Location within Poland
- Coordinates: 52°1′N 16°3′E
- Country: Poland
- Voivodeship: Greater Poland
- County: Wolsztyn
- Gmina: Wolsztyn

Population
  - Total: 1,100
- Time zone: UTC+1 (CET)
  - Summer (DST): UTC+2 (CEST)
- Vehicle registration: PWL

Świętno (Polish: [ˈɕfjɛntnɔ]) is a village in the administrative district of Gmina Wolsztyn, within Wolsztyn County, Greater Poland Voivodeship, in west-central Poland. The village was home to the Free State of Schwenten for seven months in 1919.

== History ==
During the German evacuation from occupied Poland in the final stages of World War II, in January 1945, a German-perpetrated death march of Jewish women from a just dissolved subcamp of the Gross-Rosen concentration camp in Sława passed through the village.

== Transport ==
Świętno lies along vovoideship road 315.

The nearest railway station is in Wolsztyn.
