= Republic of Paulava =

Peasant community in the Grand Duchy of Lithuania

Paulava Republic Rzeczpospolita Pawłowska Paulavos respublika
- 1769–1795
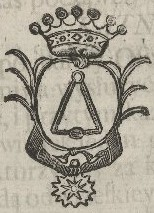
- Coat of arms
- Capital: Merkinė Manor
- Government: Unitary parliamentary republic
  - President: Paweł Ksawery Brzostowski
- Legislature: Seimas (parliament)
- History
  - Established: 1769
  - Disestablished: 1795

Area
- 30.4 km^{2} (11.7 sq mi)

Population
- 800
- Today part of: Lithuania

Paulava Republic (Lithuanian: Paulavos respublika, Polish: Rzeczpospolita Pawłowska) was a farmer community and a micro-state in the Polish-Lithuanian Commonwealth with its own parliament, army, and laws.

Located around the Merkinė Manor (also Pavlovo Manor) in present-day Šalčininkai District Municipality, Lithuania, it covered an area of 30.4 km^{2} (11.7 sq mi) and had about 800 residents.

== History ==
Paulava Republic was a small self-governing farmer community founded in 1769 by the Catholic priest Paweł Ksawery Brzostowski. The republic ceased to exist in 1795 when, due to the Third Partition of the Polish–Lithuanian Commonwealth, Brzostowski exchanged the manor with Fryderyk Józef Moszyński for properties in Saxony and Dresden.

Moszyński in turn sold the manor to Count de Choiseul-Gouffier in 1799. The new owners tolerated some of the freedoms until Brzostowski's death in 1827. The last freedoms were lost when farmers joined the failed November Uprising in 1830.

== Government ==
The community was governed by Paweł Ksawery Brzostowski, who declared himself President, and Seimas (parliament), which was formed from the local peasants. The republic had its own constitution which was created before the Constitution of 3 May 1791.

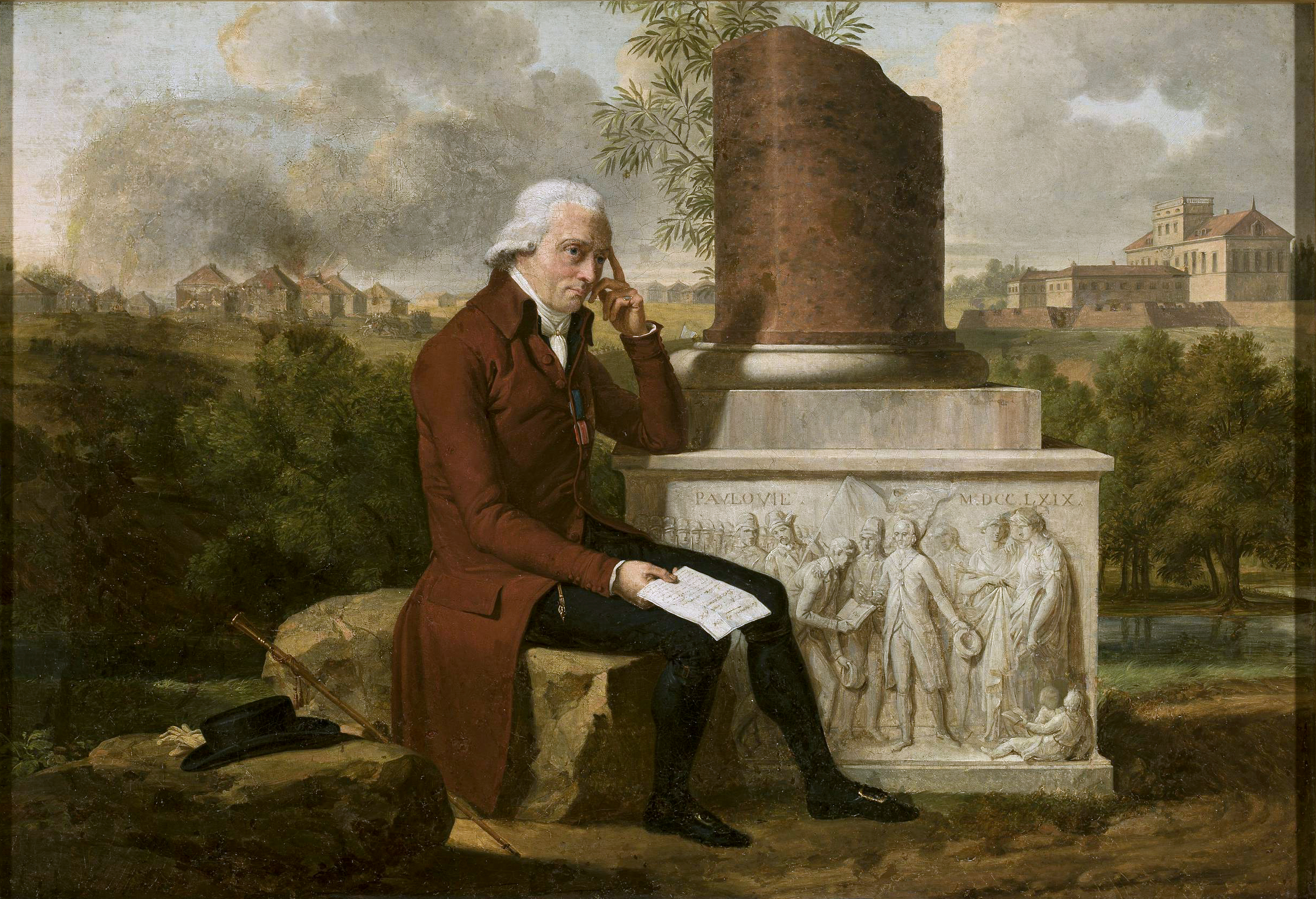
Paweł Ksawery Brzostowski in Paulava Republic

=== Recognition ===
The state was recognized by the Grand Duke and King Stanisław August Poniatowski himself. The Great Sejm (1788–1792) also recognized the republic and approved its statute.

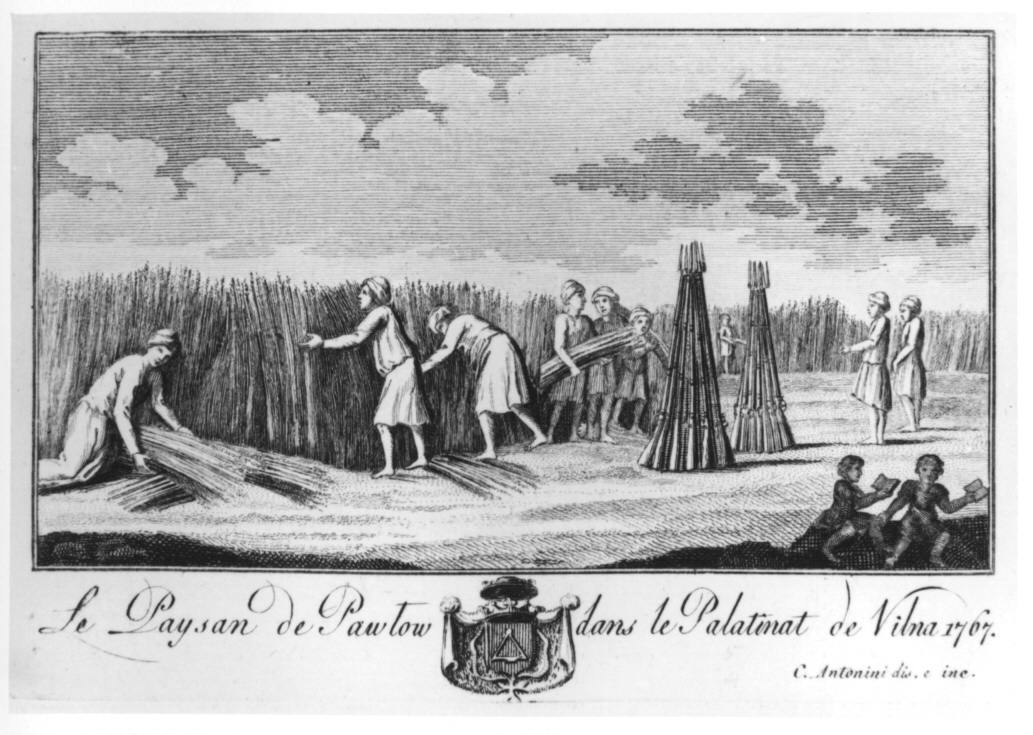
Peasants of Paulava

=== Reforms ===
Brzostowski implemented various progressive policies – abolished serfdom and granted personal freedoms to the peasants, replaced corvée with a land tax paid in cash, established a school and a pharmacy, encouraged more profitable agricultural activities, e.g. fruit tree gardens and animal husbandry. Brzostowski's revenue from the manor more than doubled.
