= Paweł Ksawery Brzostowski =

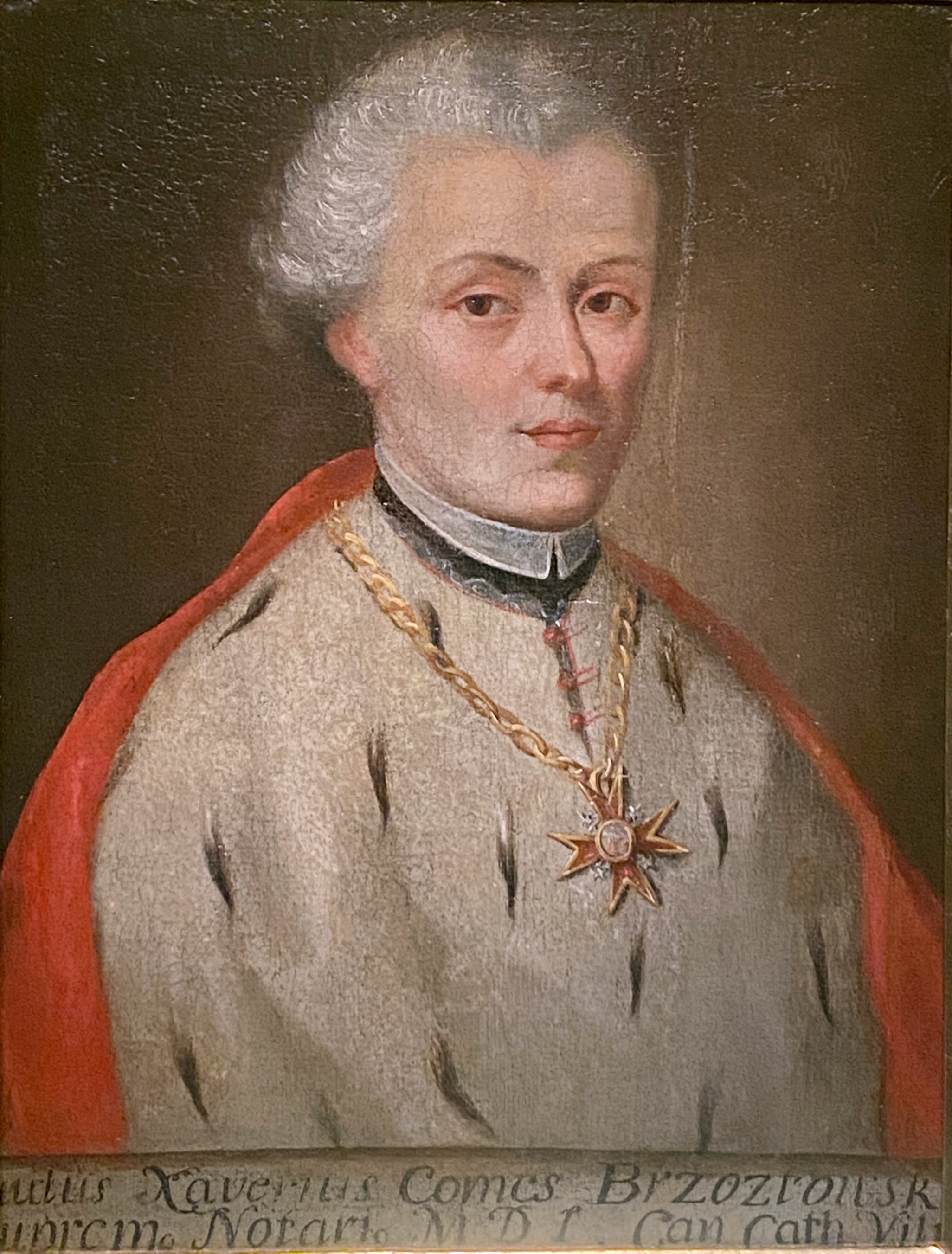
Portrait of Paweł Ksawery Brzostowski

Paweł Ksawery Brzostowski (1739-1827) was a Lithuanian noble, writer, publicist, and Catholic priest. He held the office of Great Scribe of Lithuania since 1762, Canon of Vilnius from 1755 to 1773, and the Great Lithuanian Referendary from 1774 to 1787.

== See also ==
- Republic of Paulava
